= Aayi Mandapam =

Monument in Pondicherry, India

Coordinates: 11.93310°N 79.83420°E

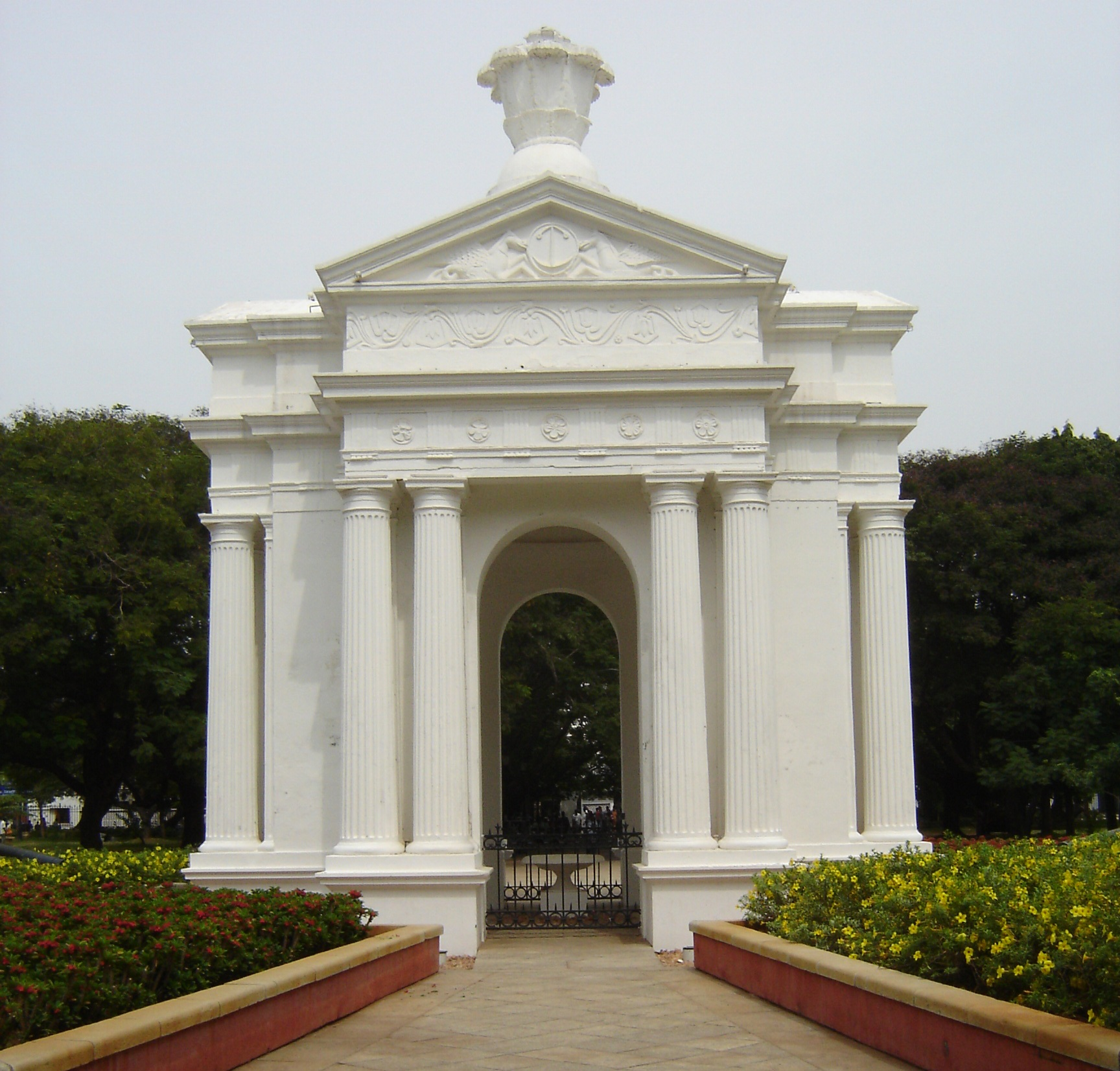
Park Monument (Aayi Mandapam) in the Government Park of Pondicherry Statue of Aayi inside the Mandapam, Bharathi Park, Pondicherry

Aayi Mandapam, also known as Park Monument (French: Monument du Parc), is a white monument in Pondicherry, India, built during the time of Napoleon III, Emperor of France. It is situated in the center of Bharati Park. The monument commemorates the provision of water to the city during French colonial rule. It was named after a lady courtesan named Aayi, who destroyed her own house to erect a water reservoir to supply water for the city.
