= Fort Louis (Pondicherry) =

Coordinates: 11.9318°N 79.8331°E

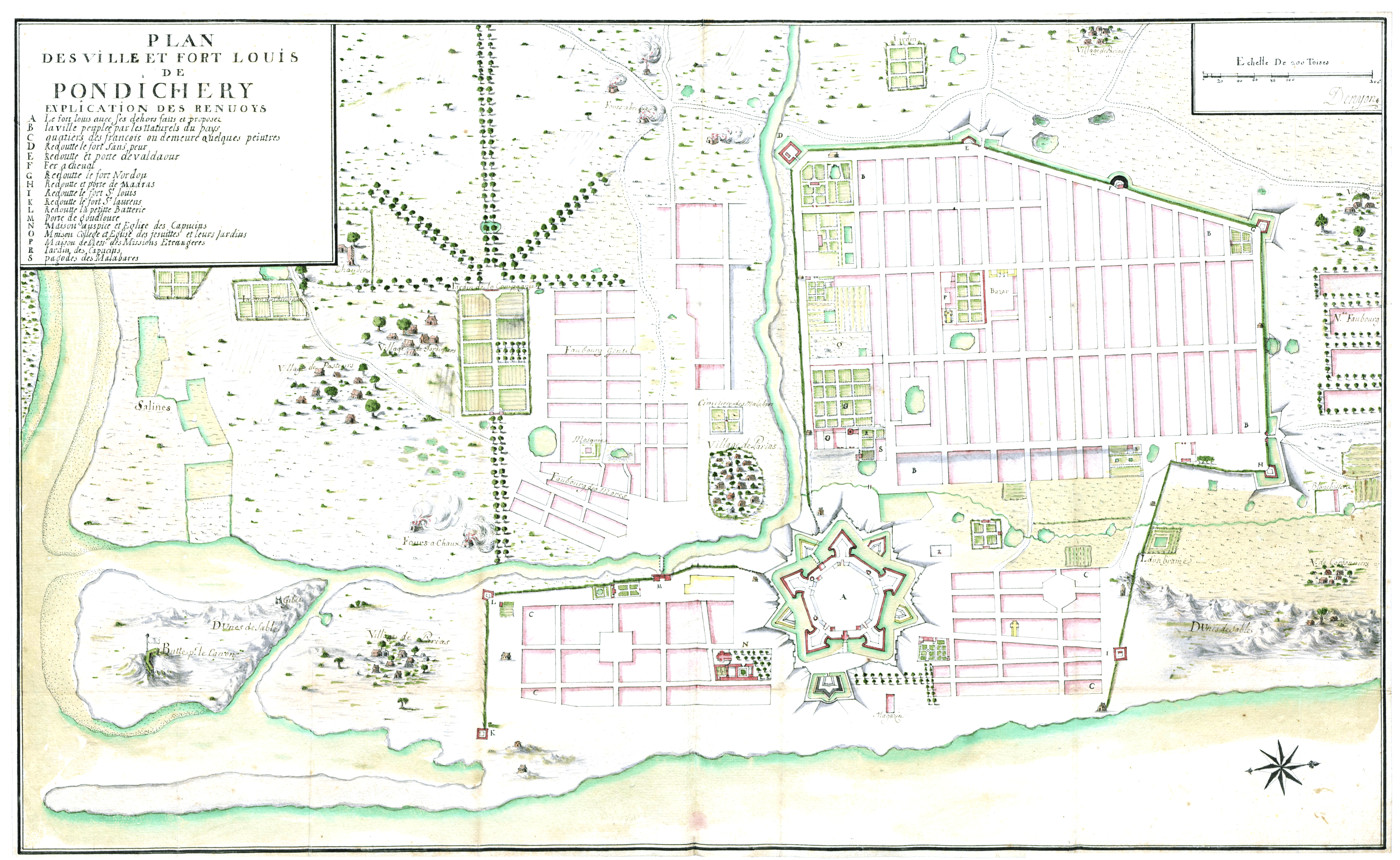
A 1716 map with the fort (Alignment)

Fort Louis or Fort Saint Louis was a French fort that stood in Pondicherry on the eastern coast of India. The fort was built around 1701 by François Martin and completed posthumously around 1706. A canal separated the native and European settlements. It was destroyed by the English in 1761. The centre of the fort was marked by a citadel that stood where the Bharati Park is currently located.

== History ==
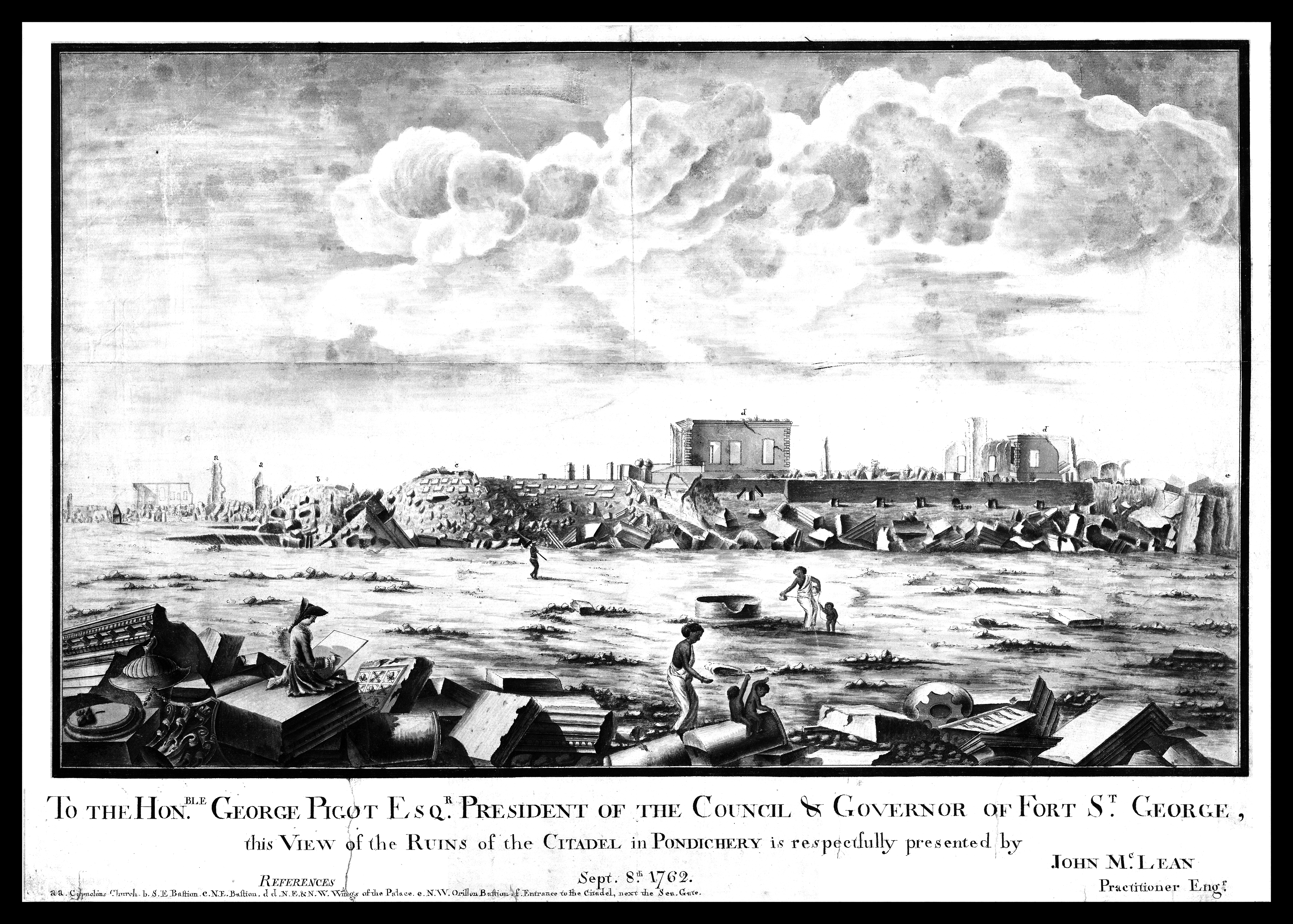
Ruins of the citadel, c. 1762

Fort Louis in present day Puducherry was constructed around the year 1709. It was built on the French plan, which was established by Vauban at Tournai in the French-speaking Belgium. The fort was designed by an engineer, de Nyon, and had a pentagonal shape. It boasted five bastions and a couple of gates and had underground chambers to store arms, ammunitions and other commodities.

The fort was bordered by a moat and served as the citadel with native and European housing in gridded layout nearby. The muslim quarter to the southwest of the fort had diagonal roads. The fort was destroyed by the British in 1761. The site of French Fort Louis was very close to the Government Park (also known as Bharati Park) which is now surrounded by government buildings including the governor's office. The areas of the town were called Ville Blanche (white town) and Ville Noir (black town for the natives).
