= The Twins of Pondicherry =

Indian environmental activists (born 1963)

T. Srinivasa Rao and R. Gnanasekaran
- T.Srinivasa Rao (left) and R.Gnanasegaran during one of their expeditions
- Born: c. 1963; Puducherry, India
- Occupations: Environmental activists, peace ambassadors
- Years active: 1986–2010
- Known for: Seven global expeditions to raise awareness for peace and environmental issues

T. Srinivasa Rao and R. Gnanasekaran (born c. 1963), popularly known as the Twins of Pondicherry, are Indian twin brothers from Puducherry who became internationally renowned for their series of seven global odysseys dedicated to world peace and environmental conservation. Between 1986 and 2010, they undertook expeditions across more than 120 countries and covered over 600,000 km, often traveling in modest vehicles such as bicycles, a Maruti Gypsy, Maruti Zen, and later Hyundai models.

Their journeys earned them recognition as grassroots ambassadors of peace and environmental awareness. They consistently concluded their missions by presenting reports to successive United Nations Secretaries-General, including Javier Pérez de Cuéllar, Boutros Boutros-Ghali, Kofi Annan and Ban Ki-moon.

== Early life ==
The twins were born into a family of freedom fighters. Their parents actively resisted British and French colonial rule in Puducherry and were imprisoned for their activism. Their mother supported the family by working in a local textile mill. Inspired by their parents' sacrifices, the brothers resolved early in life to dedicate themselves to causes larger than their personal welfare.

== Expeditions ==
They have undertaken seven major global odysseys since 1986, each devoted to peace or environmental causes.

Years	Vehicle	Mission	Distance Covered	Start / Flag-off	Countries Covered	Key Milestones	UN / Leader Meetings
1986–1989	Bicycles	Nuclear disarmament & World Peace	~50,000 km	Flagged off by M. G. Ramachandran in New Delhi	41	First bicycle tour across Asia, Europe, N. America; received "Indian Peace Cyclists Day" honour in Kentucky	Met Javier Pérez de Cuéllar at UN (1988)
1990–1993	Maruti Gypsy	Environmental awareness, afforestation, global warming	~160,000 km	Flagged off by PM V. P. Singh (1990)	70	First Indian car expedition to 70 countries; crossed five continents	Met Nelson Mandela in Johannesburg (1992) Met Boutros Boutros-Ghali at UN (1993)
1996–1998	Maruti Zen	"Save Antarctica" – highlight vulnerability of polar regions	~55,000 km	Flagged off by PM H. D. Deve Gowda (1996)	~30	Drove across South America; visited Chilean and Argentine Antarctic bases	Meetings with scientists; message submitted to UN
2000–2002	Maruti Gypsy	"Save the Planet" – sustainable development, ecosystems	~100,000 km	Flagged off by President K. R. Narayanan (2000)	60+	Survived desert ordeal in Australian outback	Presented report to Kofi Annan (2001)
2003–2004	Maruti Gypsy	"Mission Save Earth" – climate change & sustainable living	~50,000 km	Flagged off by CM J. Jayalalithaa (2003)	40+	Petition campaign with thousands of global signatures	Submitted petition to UN in New York (2004)
2005–2007	Hyundai Accent	"Save the Rainforest" – tropical conservation	~50,000 km	Flagged off by President A. P. J. Abdul Kalam (2005)	35+	Collaborated with Greenpeace and WWF projects in Amazonia	Advocacy presentations at UN side-events
2008–2010	Hyundai Tucson	"Stop Global Warming" – global climate change campaign	~100,000 km	Flagged off by PM Manmohan Singh (2008)	30–50	Culminated at the UN Earth Summit, New York	Delivered global warming petition to Ban Ki-moon at UN (2010)

== Gallery ==
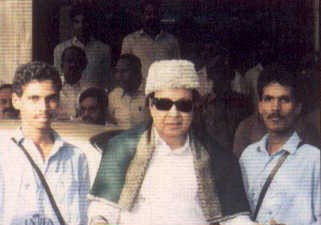
T.Srinivasa Rao and R.Gnanasegaran meeting Tamilnadu Chief Minister Mr. M.G.Ramachandiran

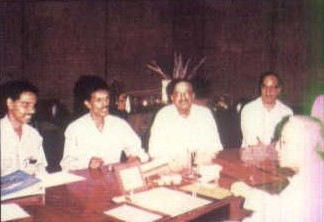
T.Srinivasa Rao and R.Gnanasegaran met Mr. Jyoti Basu, the then Hon'ble Chief Minister of West Bengal

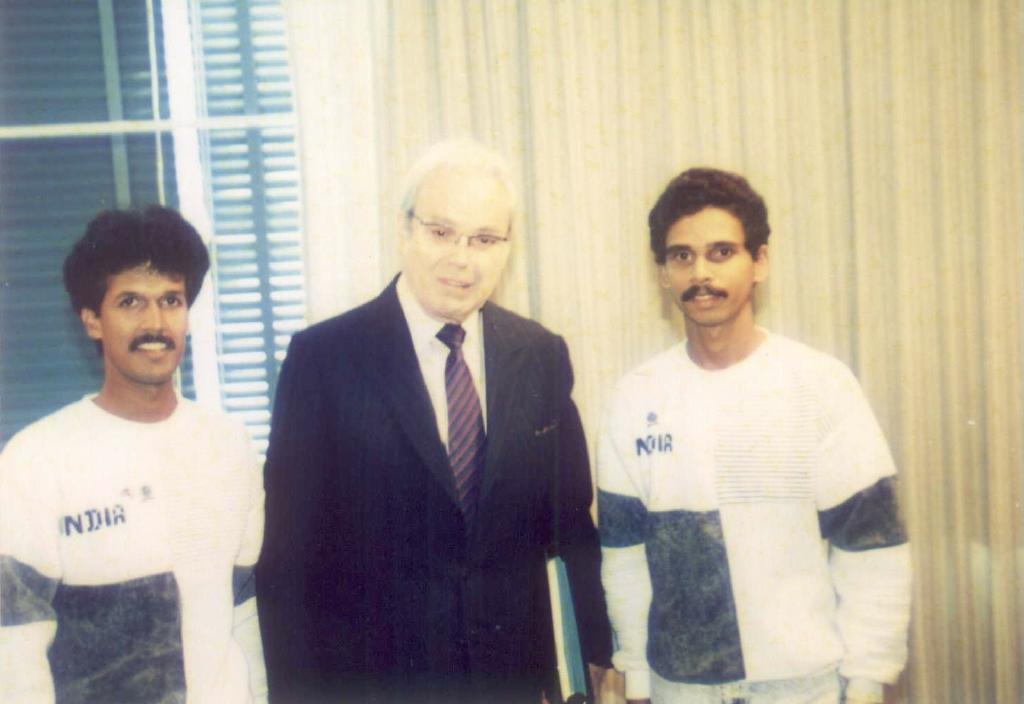
T.Srinivasa Rao and R.Gnanasegaran meeting with Javier Pérez de Cuéllar, Secretary General UNO

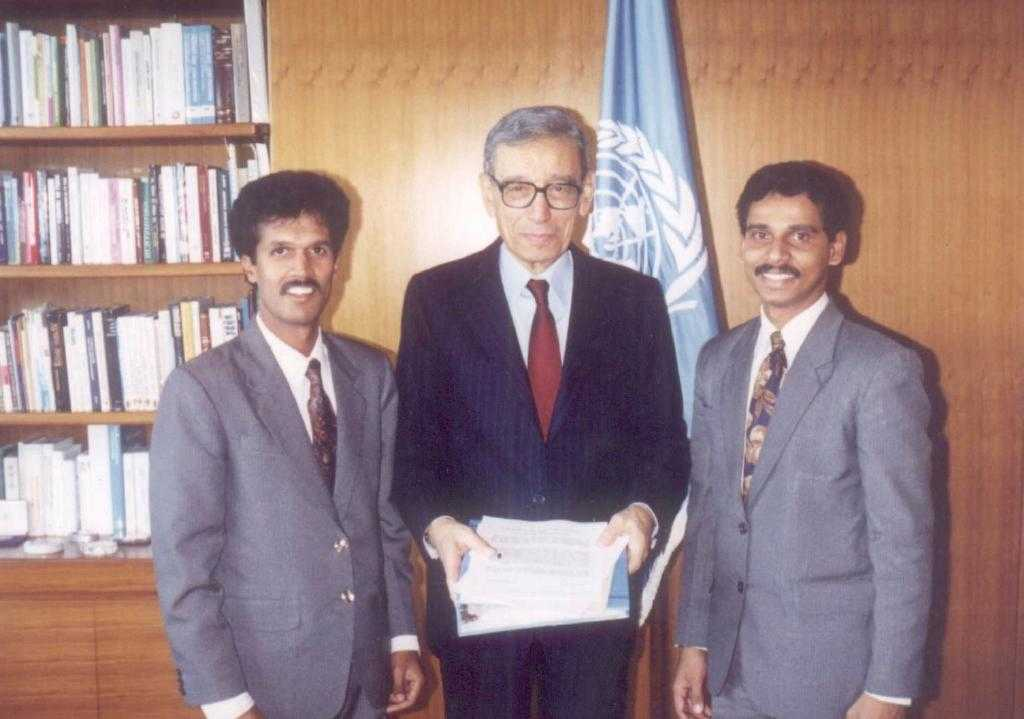
T.Srinivasa Rao and R.Gnanasegaran meeting with Boutros Boutros-Ghali, Secretary General UNO

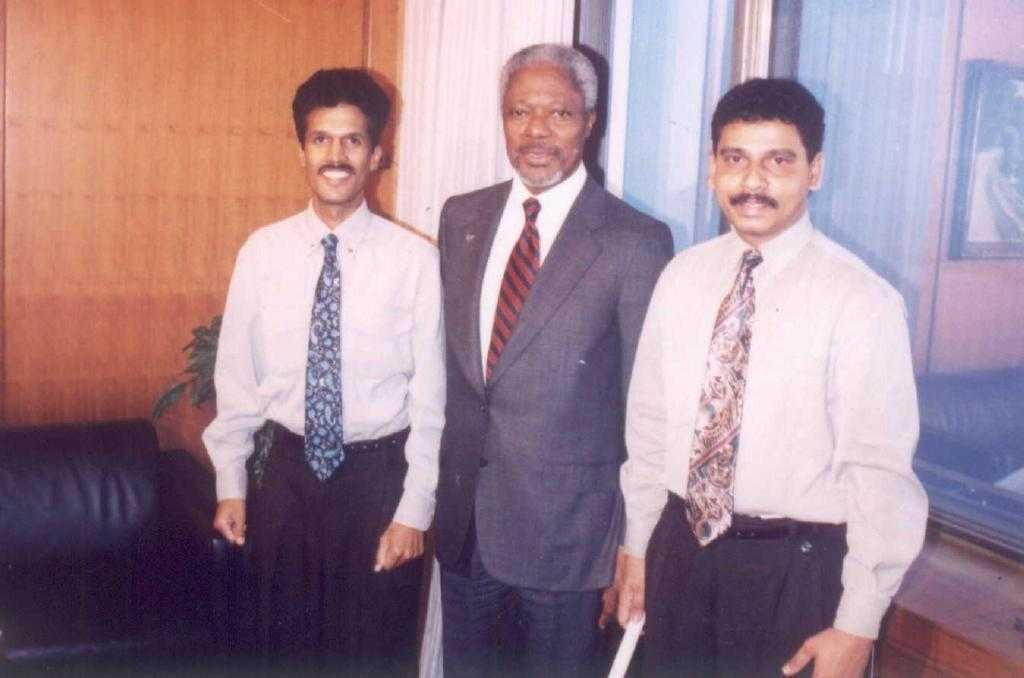
T.Srinivasa Rao and R.Gnanasegaran meeting with Kofi Annan, Secretary General UNO

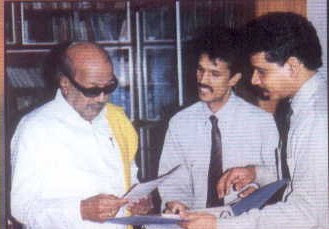
T.Srinivasa Rao and R.Gnanasegaran meeting Tamilnadu Chief Minister M Karunanidhi

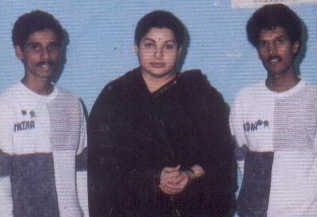
T.Srinivasa Rao and R.Gnanasegaran meeting Tamilnadu Chief Minister Selvi J. Jayalalitha

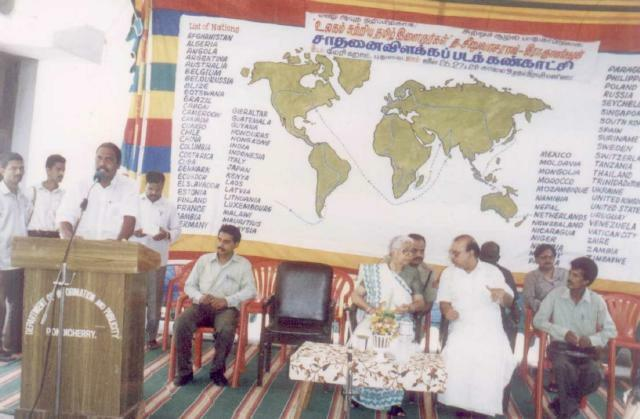
Hon'ble Pondicherry Chief Minister Mr. N. Rangasamy addressing a Meeting. Seen Twins T.Srinivasa Rao and R.Ganansekaran, Lt. Governor Rajendra Kumari Bajpai and the then Hon'ble Education Minister Mr. A. Gandhiraj

== Legacy ==
- Declared "Indian Peace Cyclists Day" in Kentucky, USA.
- Received honorary citizenships in several U.S. cities.
- Awarded ceremonial keys to cities such as Austin and Santiago.
- Authored the book Mission Save Earth (2001).
- Met four successive UN Secretary-Generals and presented reports of their missions.

== See also ==
- Puducherry
