= Pondicherry =

Capital city of the Indian Union Territory of Pondicherry

- City
- Puducherry
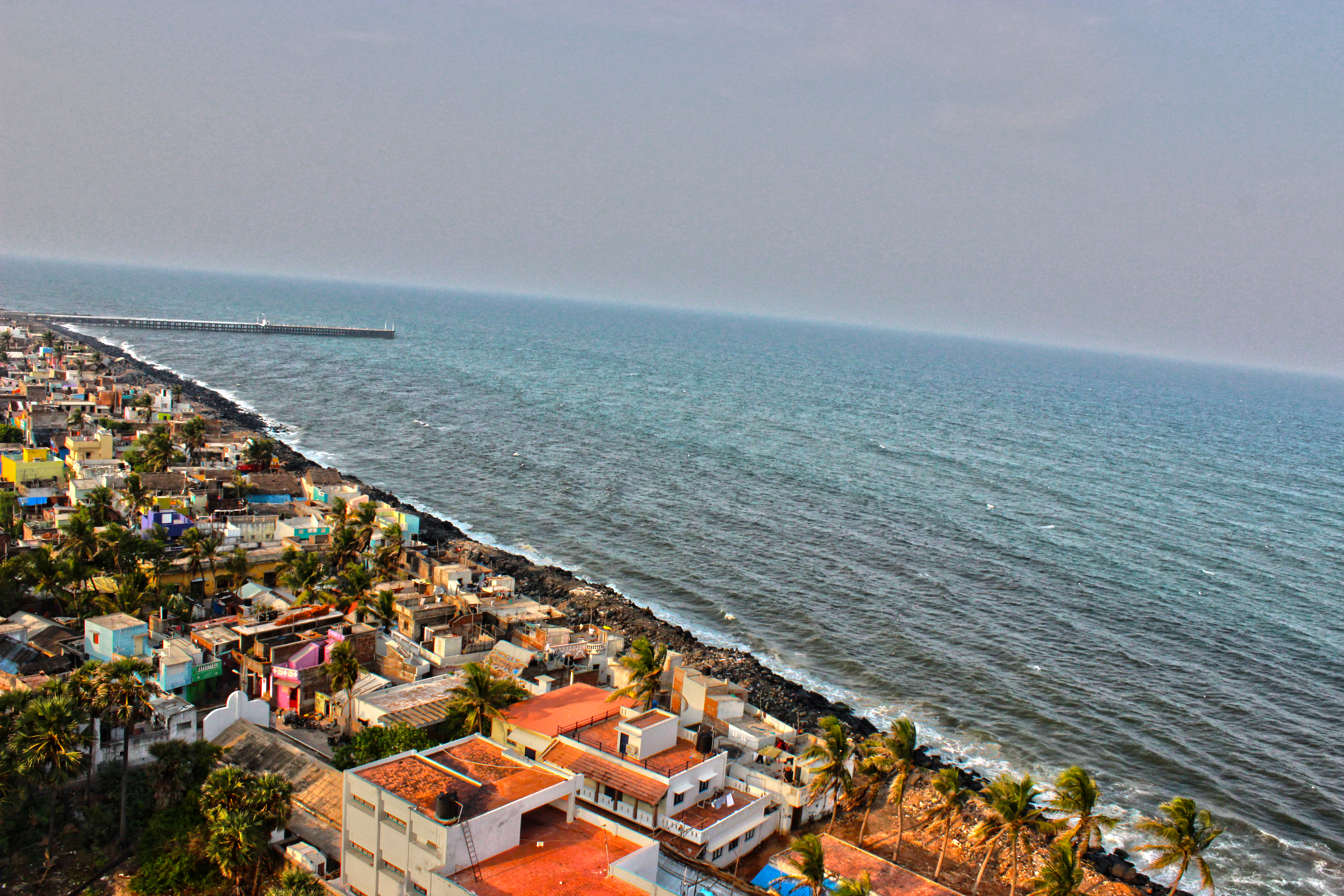
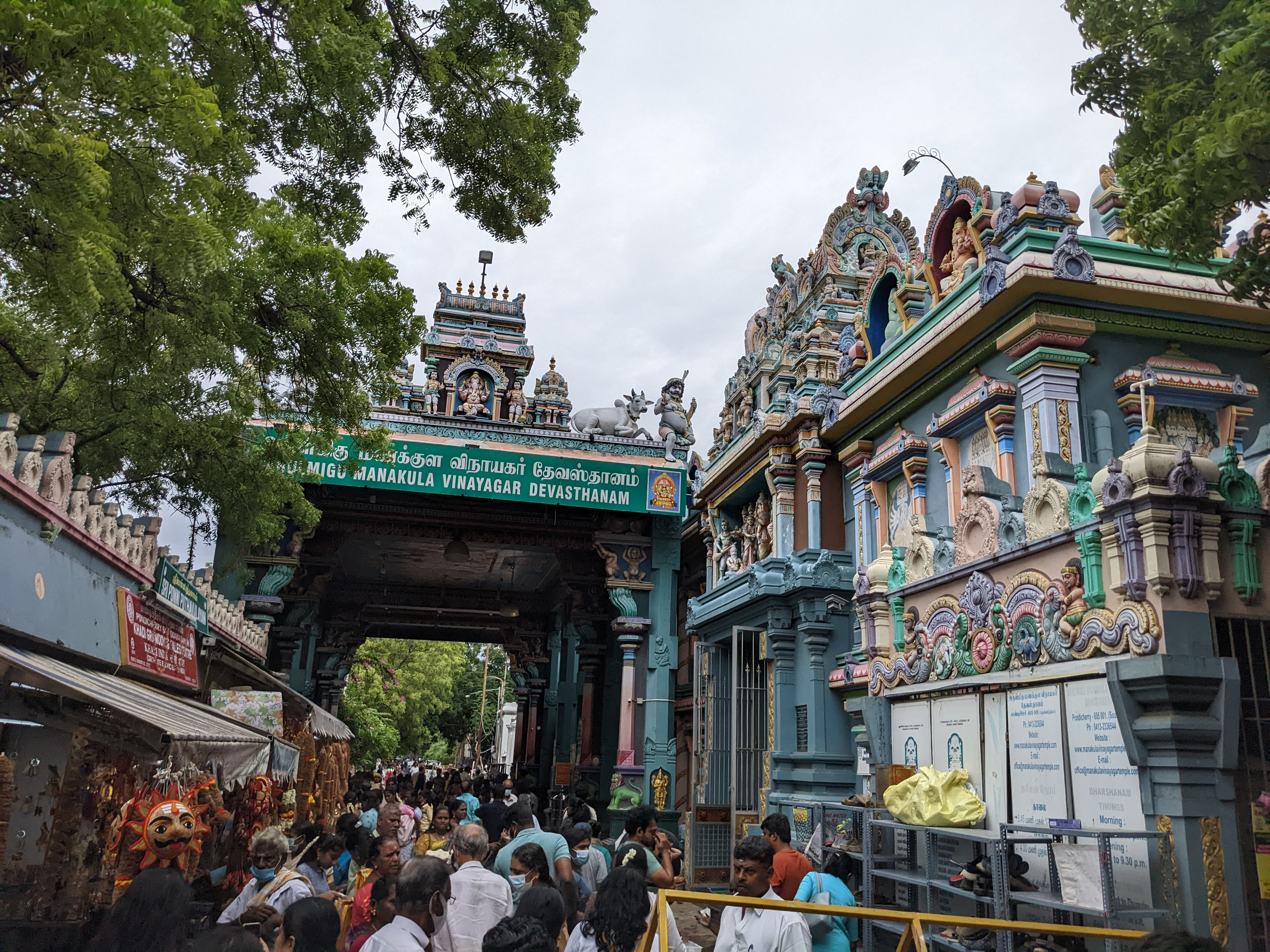
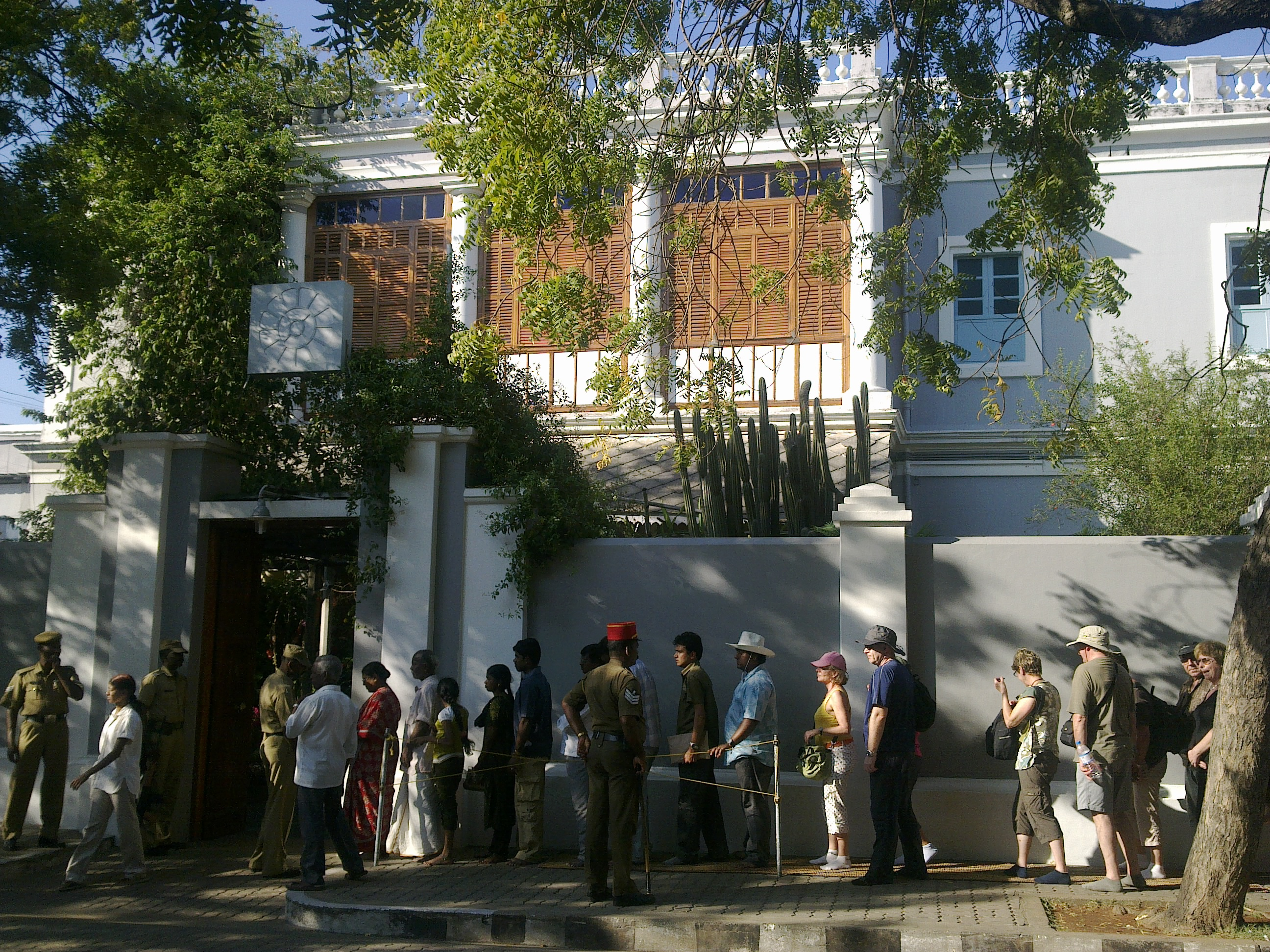
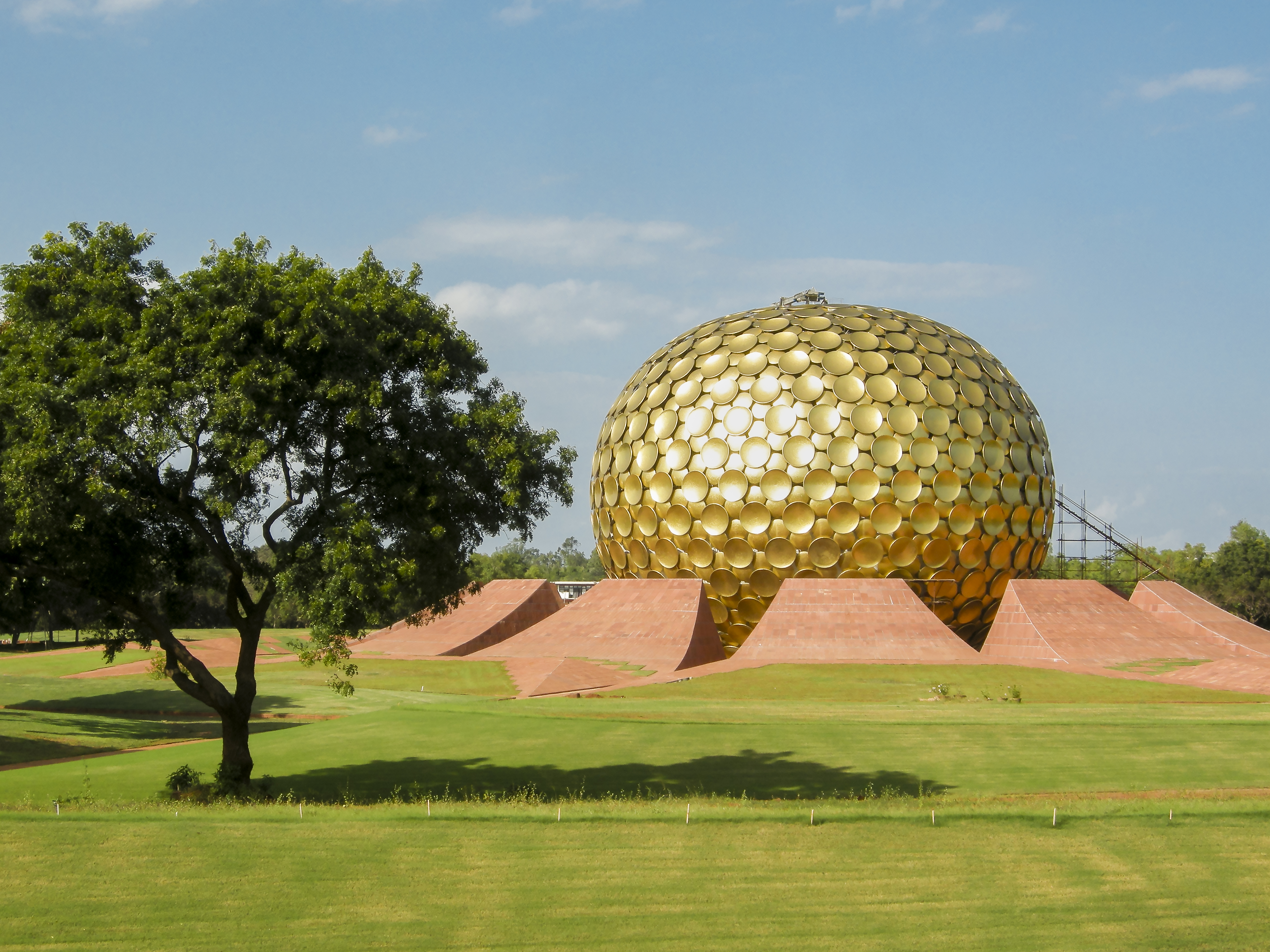
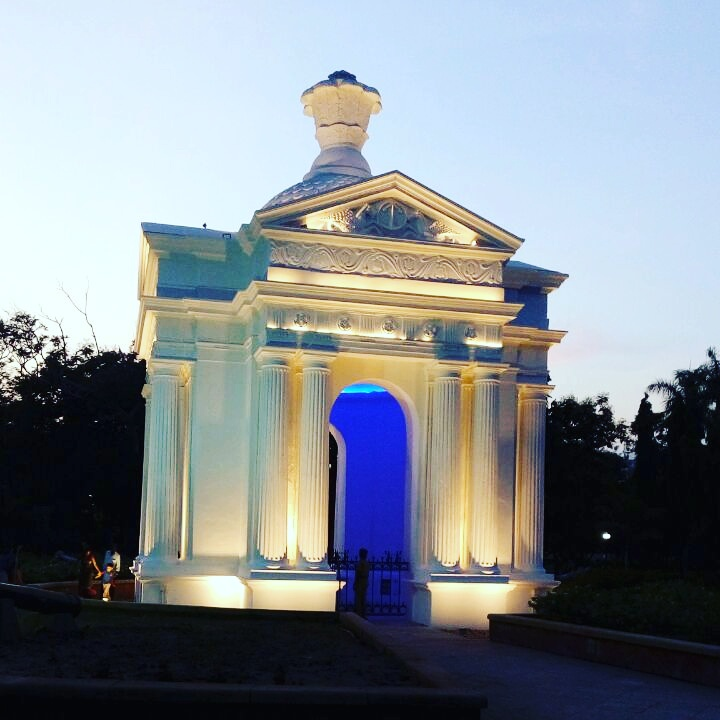
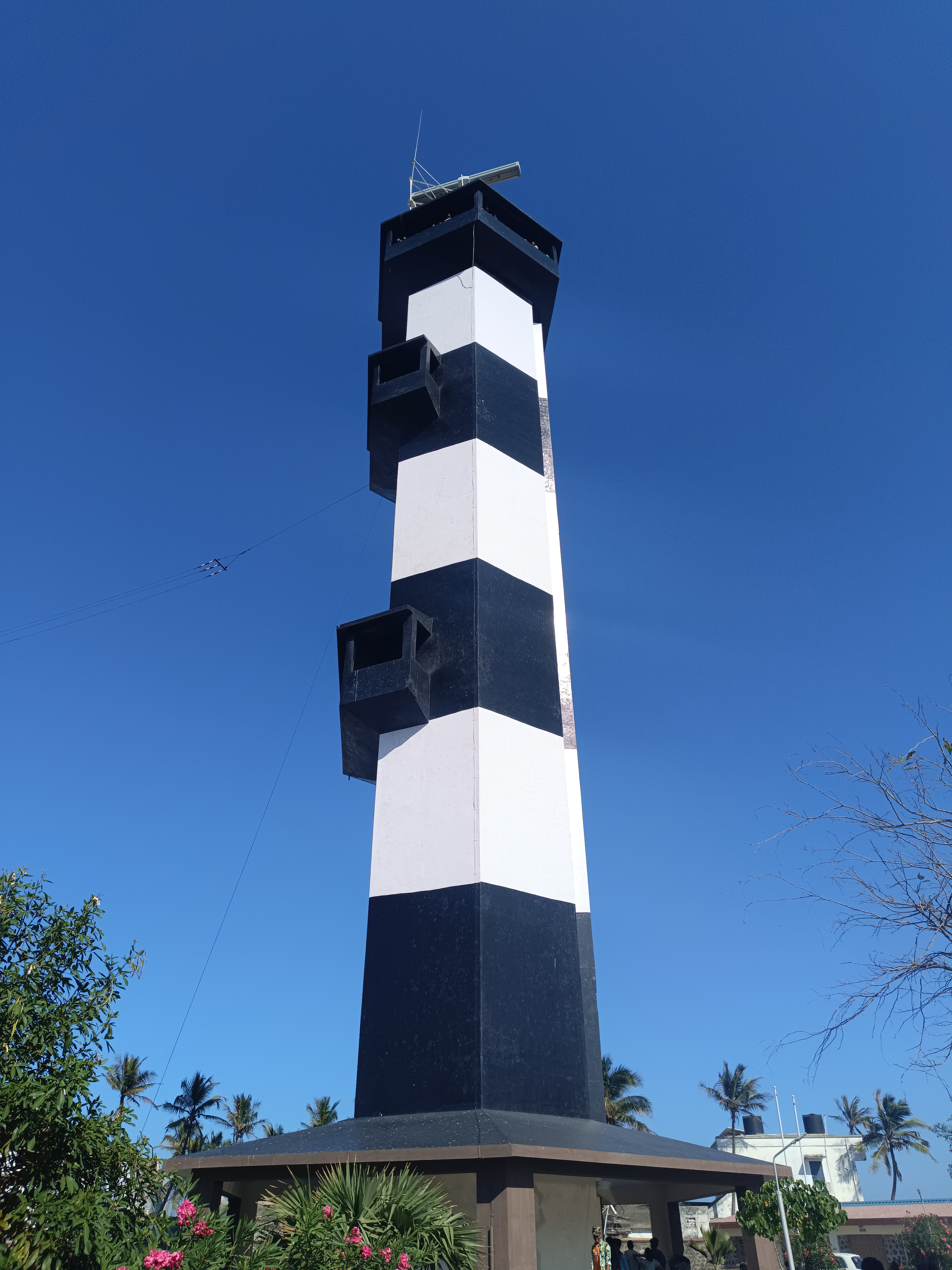
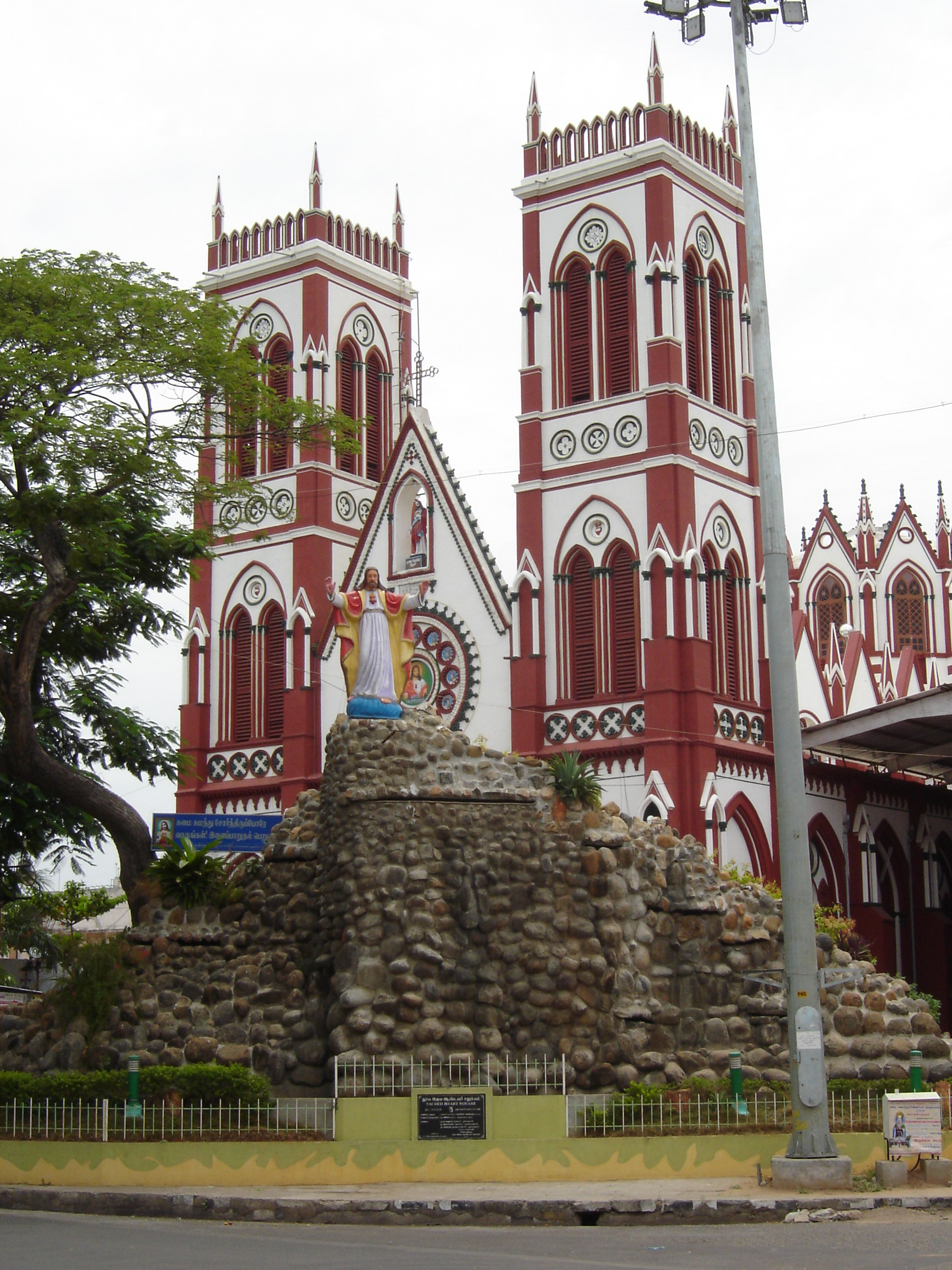
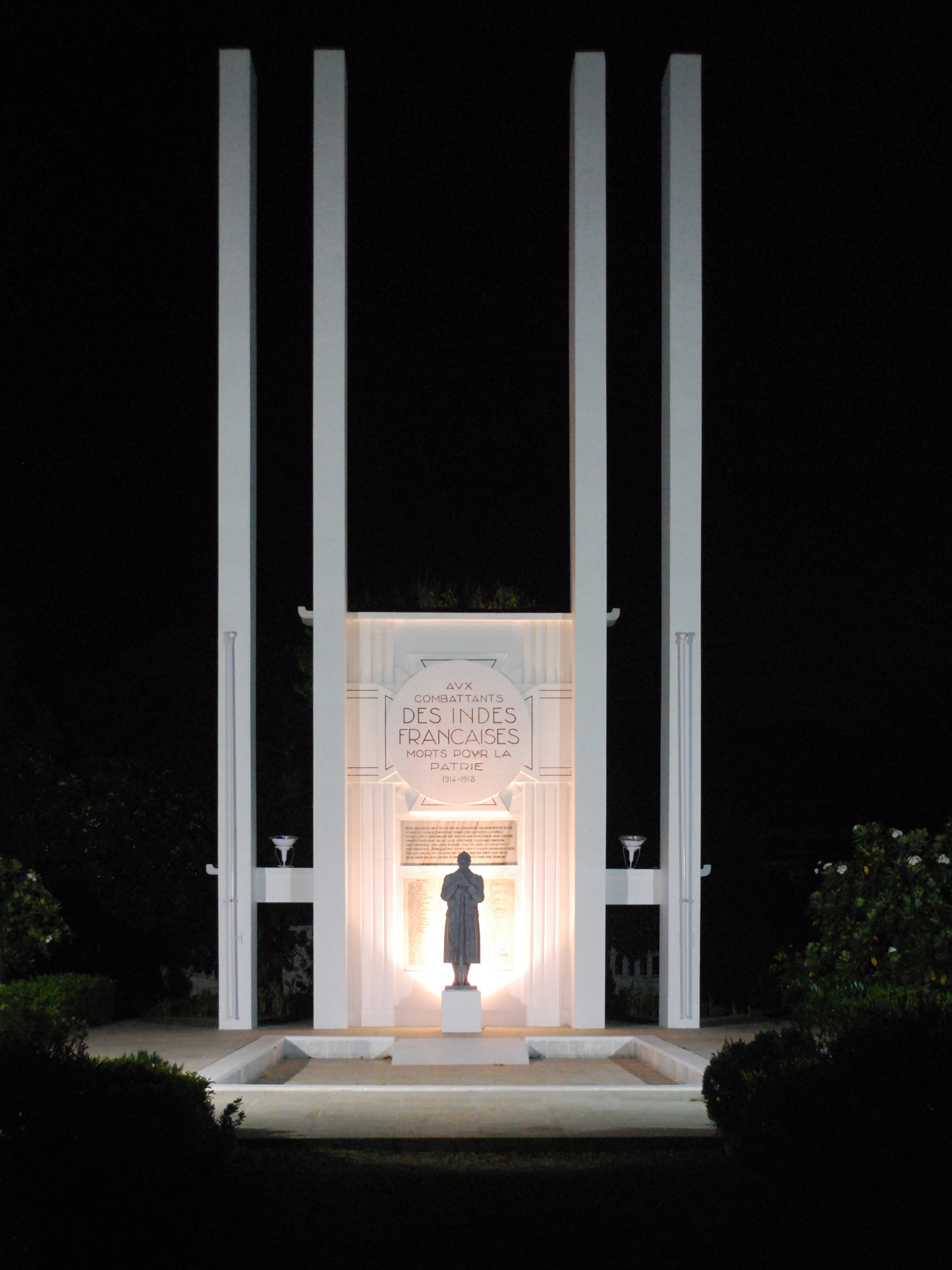
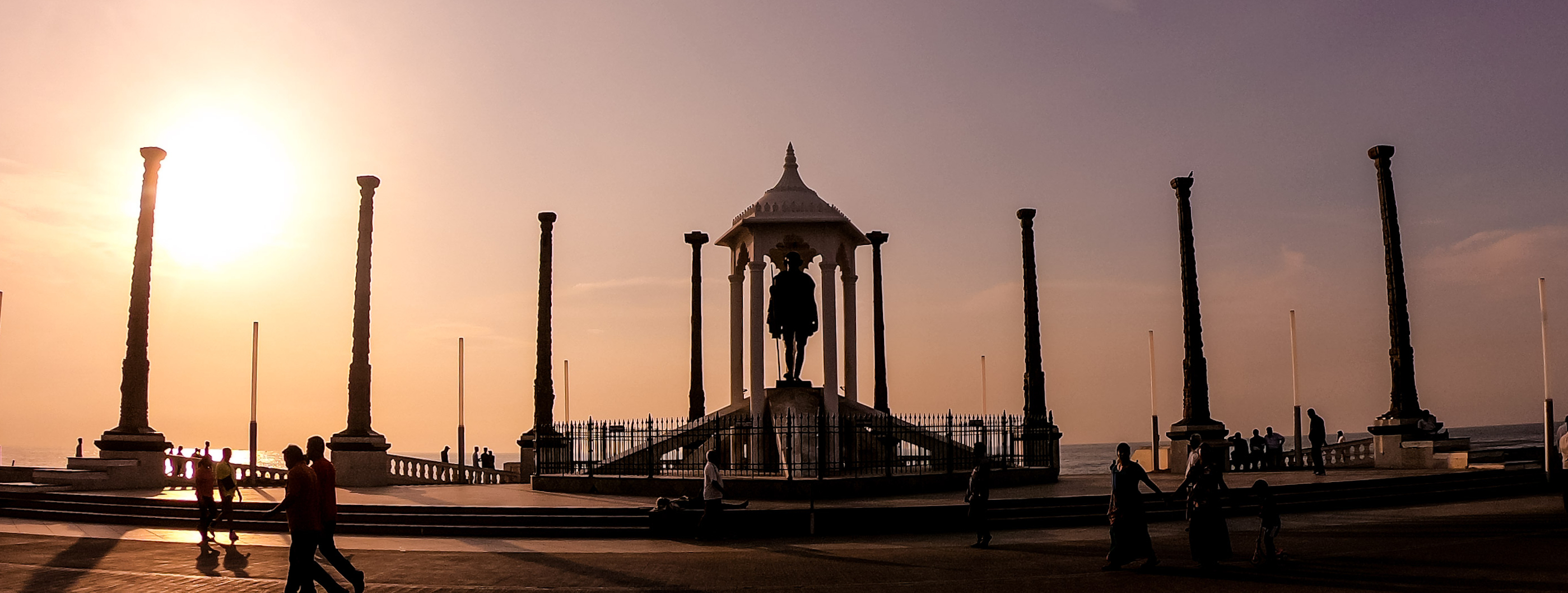
- Promenade Beach Manakula Vinayagar Temple Sri Aurobindo Ashram The Matrimandir in Auroville Aayi Mandapam monument at Bharati Park Pondicherry Lighthouse Basilica of the Sacred Heart of Jesus French War Memorial built after World War I Mahatma Gandhi Statue along the Beach Road

- Seal of Puducherry Municipality
- Nicknames: "Paris of the East"; "Pondy"; "The City of Dawn"; "French Riviera of the East"
- Location within Puducherry Location within India
- Coordinates: 11°56′2.449″N 79°49′44.502″E
- Country: India
- Union territory: Puducherry (PY)
- District: Puducherry
- Established: 1674

Government
  - Type: Municipal Council
  - Body: Pondicherry Municipal Council (PDY)

Area
  - Total: 19.54 km^{2} (7.54 sq mi)
- Elevation: 3 m (9.8 ft)

Population (2011)
  - Total: 244,377
  - Density: 12,510/km^{2} (32,390/sq mi)
- Demonym(s): Puducherrian, Pondicherrian, Pondian, Pondichérien, Pondichérienne

Languages
  - Official: Tamil
  - Additional: English, French
- Time zone: UTC+5:30 (IST)
- PIN CODE: 605001-605014
- Telephone code: (International) +91-413-, (National) 0413-
- Vehicle registration: PY-01 to PY-05
- Website: py.gov.in

Pondicherry, (Note: /ˌpɒndɪˈtʃɛri/ PON-dih-CHERR-ee; Tamil: Pāṇṭiccēri [paːɳɖiˈtːɕeːɾi]; French: Pondichéry [pɔ̃diʃeʁi].) officially known as Puducherry, (Note: /ˌpʊdʊˈtʃɛri/ PUU-duu-CHERR-ee; Tamil: Putuccēri [puðuˈtːɕeːɾi].) is the capital and most populous city of the Union Territory of Puducherry in India. The city is in the Puducherry district on the southeast coast of India and is surrounded by the Bay of Bengal to the east and the state of Tamil Nadu, with which it shares most of its culture, heritage, and language.

== Etymology ==
Pondicherry is derived from Tamil putu-cēri "new village" and was first spelt as Poudichéry by the French. The u was later misread as n and the spelling Pondichéry stuck.

== History ==
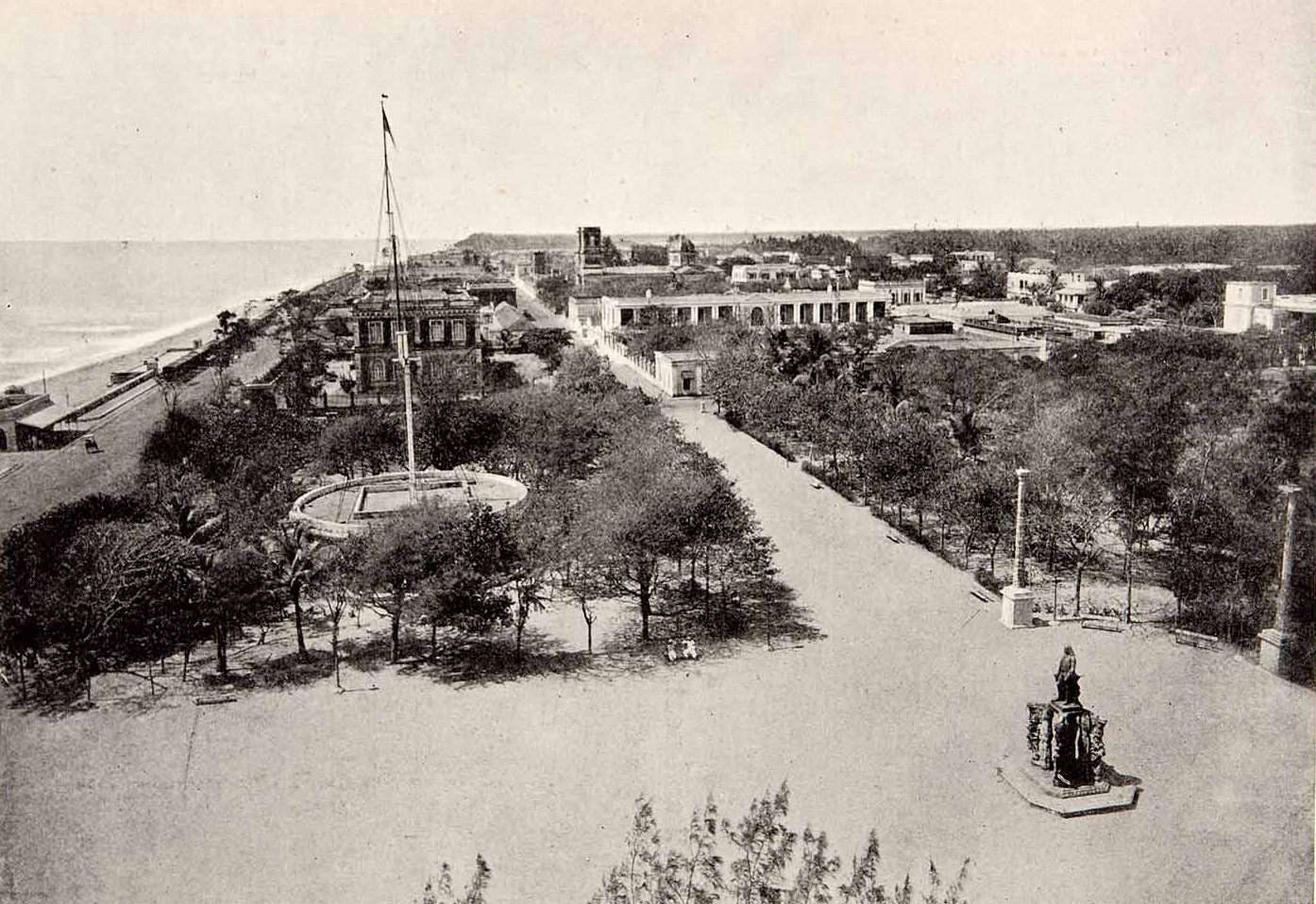
Pondicherry waterfront, c. 1900

Puducherry, formerly known as Pondicherry and Poudichéry, gained its significance as "the French Riviera of the East" after the advent of French colonialisation in India. Puducherry is the Tamil interpretation of "new town" and mainly derives from "Poduke", the name of the marketplace or "port town" for Roman trade in the 1st century, as mentioned in the Periplus of the Erythraean Sea. The settlement was once an abode of learned scholars versed in the Vedas, hence it was also known as Vedapuri.

The history of Puducherry can broadly be classified into two periods: pre-colonial and colonial. The pre-colonial period started with the reign of the Pallavas, who ruled the empire from 325 to 900, after which came the Chola dynasty, from 900 to 1279, and the Pandya dynasty, from 1279 to 1370. During the 14th century, the city was under the rule of the Nayaks of Gingee of the Vijayanagara Empire, from 1370 to 1614, when it was conquered by the Sultan of Bijapur, who ruled it from 1614 to 1638. It was during this period that Portuguese and Danish merchants used it as a trading centre.

The colonial period began with the Portuguese, the first Europeans to conduct trade in textiles, in 1521, and subsequently, the Dutch and the Danes in the 17th century.

Puducherry's flourishing trade attracted the French, and the predominant feature of the town was laid by the French pioneer François Martin in the form of a French settlement, in 1674. In 1693, Puducherry was captured by the Dutch and subsequently restored in 1699, with the Treaty of Ryswick.

The French acquired Mahé in 1720, Yanam in 1731, and Karaikal in 1738. The British captured the city from the French but returned it following the Treaty of Paris, in 1763. This Anglo-French war continued until 1814, where France found itself in control of the settlements of Puducherry, Mahé, Yanam, Karaikal, and Chandernagor, even during the British period, until 1954. It was a reign of 138 years under the French, who on 31 October 1954 left Indian shores following a de facto transfer of power.

Nearby places such as Arikamedu, Ariyankuppam, Kakayanthoppe, Villianur, and Bahour, which were colonised by the French East India Company over a period of time and later became the union territory of Pondicherry, have recorded histories that predate the colonial period.

Poduke or Poduca (marketplace) was a Roman trading destination from the third century BCE. Poduca has been identified as possibly being Arikamedu (now part of Ariyankuppam), located about 2 miles (3.2 km) from the modern city of Pondicherry. The area was part of the Pallava Kingdom of Kanchipuram in the 4th century. The Cholas of Thanjavur held it from the 10th to the 13th centuries, until it was replaced by the Pandya Kingdom, in the 13th century. The Vijayanagar Empire took control of almost all of southern India in the 14th century and maintained control until 1638, when they were supplanted by the Sultan of Bijapur.

In 1674, the French East India Company set up a trading centre at Pondicherry, and this outpost eventually became the chief French settlement in India. The French governor François Martin made remarkable improvements to the city and its commercial ties, facing at the same time strong opposition from the Dutch and the English. He entered into extended negotiations with the sultans of Golconda through the intercession of several roving French merchants and doctors who were in favour with the sultan. Trading in jewellery and precious stones, which had become highly fashionable in European courts, was one among many activities. Five trading posts were established along the south Indian coast between 1668 and 1674. The city was separated by a canal into the French Quarter and the Indian Quarter.

On 21 August 1693, during the Nine Years' War, Pondicherry was captured by the Dutch. The governor of Dutch Coromandel, Laurens Pit the Younger, sailed with a fleet of seventeen ships and 1,600 men from Nagapattinam and bombarded Pondicherry for two weeks, after which François Martin surrendered it. At the Peace of Ryswick, it was agreed by all parties to return conquered territories, and in 1699, Pondicherry was handed back to the French.

On 16 January 1761, the British captured Pondicherry from the French, but it was returned under the 1763 Treaty of Paris, at the conclusion of the Seven Years' War. The British took control of the area again in 1793, at the Siege of Pondicherry, amid the Wars of the French Revolution, and returned it to France in 1814.

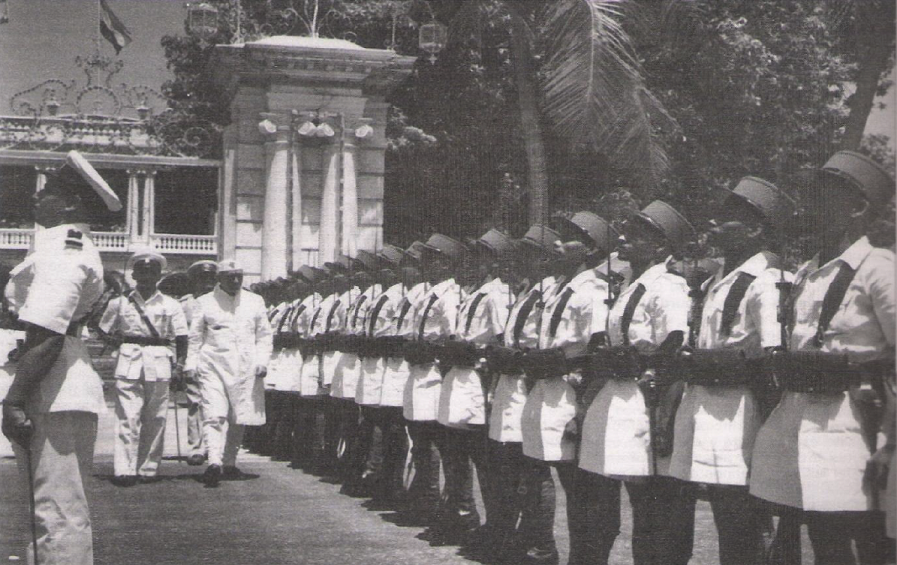
Prime Minister Nehru visiting Pondicherry a few months after the de facto transfer

On 18 March 1954, a number of resolutions were passed by the municipalities in Pondicherry, demanding an immediate merger with India. Some days later, similar resolutions were passed by the municipalities in Karaikal. The resolutions had the full support of the French Indian Councillors, popularly known as ministers, and the president of the representative assembly. These municipalities represented roughly 90% of the population of the French possessions, and they called upon the government of France to take urgent and necessary measures to give effect to the wishes of the people. The government of India had made it clear that the cultural and other rights of the people would be fully respected. They were not asking for the immediate transfer of de jure sovereignty of France. Their suggestion was that a de facto transfer of the administration should take place immediately, while French sovereignty should continue until the constitutional issue had been settled. Both India and France would have to make necessary changes in their respective constitutions. All this would take time, while the demand of the people was for an immediate merger without a referendum. The government of India was convinced that the suggestion which they made would help to promote a settlement, which they greatly desired.

On 18 October 1954, in a general election involving 178 people in municipal Pondicherry and the Commune of Panchayat, 170 people were in favour of the merger, and eight people voted against. The de facto transfer of the French Indian territories from French governance to the Indian union took place on 1 November 1954 and was established as the union territory of Pondicherry. The treaty effecting the de jure transfer was signed in 1956. However, due to opposition in France, the ratification of this treaty by the French National Assembly did not take place until 16 August 1962.

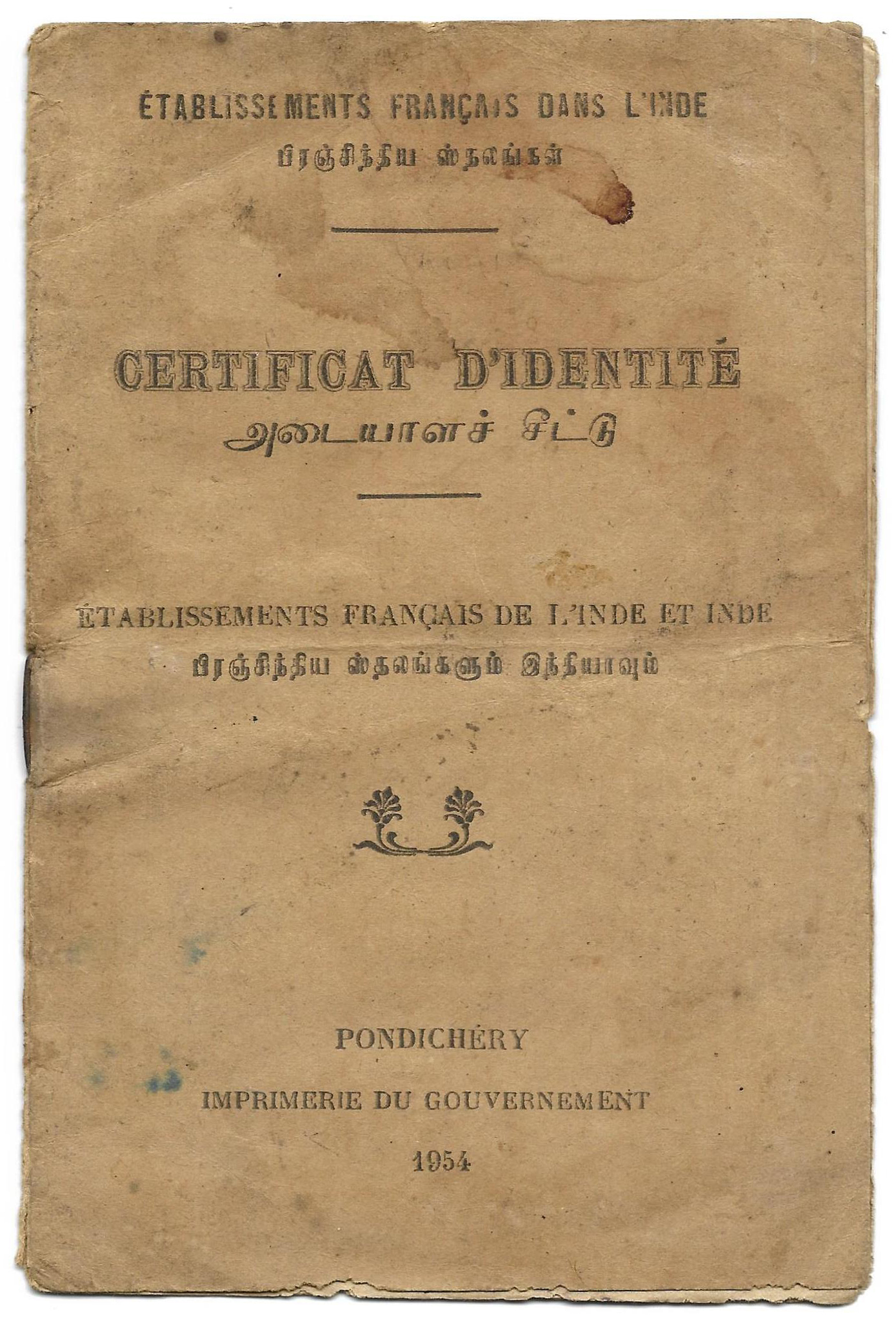
1954 French ID, issued in Pondicherry before transfer

== Geography ==
=== Topography ===
The topography of Pondicherry is the same as that of coastal Tamil Nadu. Pondicherry's average elevation is at sea level and includes a number of sea inlets, referred to locally as "backwaters". Pondicherry experiences extreme coastal erosion as a result of a breakwater constructed in 1989, just to the south of the city. Where there was once a broad, sandy beach, now the city is protected against the sea by a 2-km-long seawall that sits at a height of 8.5 m above sea level. Whilst there was an early seawall made by the French government in 1735, this was not "hard structure coastal defence" so much as an adjunct to the old shipping pier and a transition from the beach to the city.

Today, the seawall consists of rows of granite boulders reinforced every year in an attempt to stop erosion. As a consequence of the seawall, there is severe seabed erosion and turbulence at the coastal margin, resulting in an extreme loss of biodiversity within the critical intertidal zone. Whenever gaps appear as the stones fall into the continually eroding seabed, the government adds more boulders. Pondicherry's seawall has also caused beach erosion to migrate further up the coast, to the fishing villages in Puducherry and Tamil Nadu to the north of the city.

=== Climate ===
The climate of Pondicherry is classified by the Köppen climate classification as a tropical savanna climate, similar to that of coastal Tamil Nadu. This is specifically the dry-winter type (Aw), bordering on the dry-summer type (As) due to March having the lowest average rainy days of 0.7 and an average rainfall of 18.5 mm (0.73 in). Summer lasts from March to early June, and maximum temperatures may reach 41 °C (106 °F) between April and June. The average maximum temperature is 36 °C (97 °F). Minimum temperatures are in the order of 28–32 °C (82–90 °F). This is followed by a period of high humidity and occasional thundershowers, from June until September.

The northeast monsoon sets in during the middle of October, and Pondicherry gets the bulk of its annual rainfall during the period from October to December. Smaller amounts of rainfall also come from the southwest monsoon, between June and September. The annual average rainfall is 1,355 millimetres or 53 inches. The dry season is between January and June, with February having the least average rainfall of 16.9 mm (0.67 in). Winters are very warm, with highs of 30 °C (86 °F) and lows often dipping to around 18–20 °C (64–68 °F).

Climate data for Pondicherry Airport (1991–2020)
Month	Jan	Feb	Mar	Apr	May	Jun	Jul	Aug	Sep	Oct	Nov	Dec	Year
Record high °C (°F)	33.2 (91.8)	35.4 (95.7)	37.6 (99.7)	41.8 (107.2)	43.1 (109.6)	43.4 (110.1)	40.9 (105.6)	40.2 (104.4)	39.2 (102.6)	38.0 (100.4)	36.4 (97.5)	33.8 (92.8)	43.1 (109.6)
Mean daily maximum °C (°F)	30.1 (86.2)	31.2 (88.2)	32.7 (90.9)	34.4 (93.9)	36.9 (98.4)	37.1 (98.8)	36.1 (97.0)	35.2 (95.4)	34.4 (93.9)	32.6 (90.7)	30.5 (86.9)	29.6 (85.3)	33.4 (92.1)
Mean daily minimum °C (°F)	20.6 (69.1)	21.4 (70.5)	23.6 (74.5)	26.2 (79.2)	27.1 (80.8)	26.9 (80.4)	26.2 (79.2)	25.6 (78.1)	25.2 (77.4)	24.4 (75.9)	22.8 (73.0)	21.4 (70.5)	24.3 (75.7)
Record low °C (°F)	15.8 (60.4)	16.6 (61.9)	17.8 (64.0)	21.4 (70.5)	21.4 (70.5)	21.5 (70.7)	21.1 (70.0)	21.4 (70.5)	20.8 (69.4)	19.6 (67.3)	16.5 (61.7)	17.1 (62.8)	15.8 (60.4)
Average rainfall mm (inches)	17.7 (0.70)	16.9 (0.67)	18.5 (0.73)	21.0 (0.83)	66.9 (2.63)	58.5 (2.30)	74.5 (2.93)	134.9 (5.31)	134.0 (5.28)	259.9 (10.23)	347.1 (13.67)	248.1 (9.77)	1,398.1 (55.04)
Average rainy days	1.1	0.8	0.7	0.9	2.5	3.2	4.9	6.6	6.7	10.9	10.9	6.2	55.3
Average relative humidity (%)	73	71	72	76	74	66	64	68	75	79	82	78	73
Source: India Meteorological Department

== Economy ==
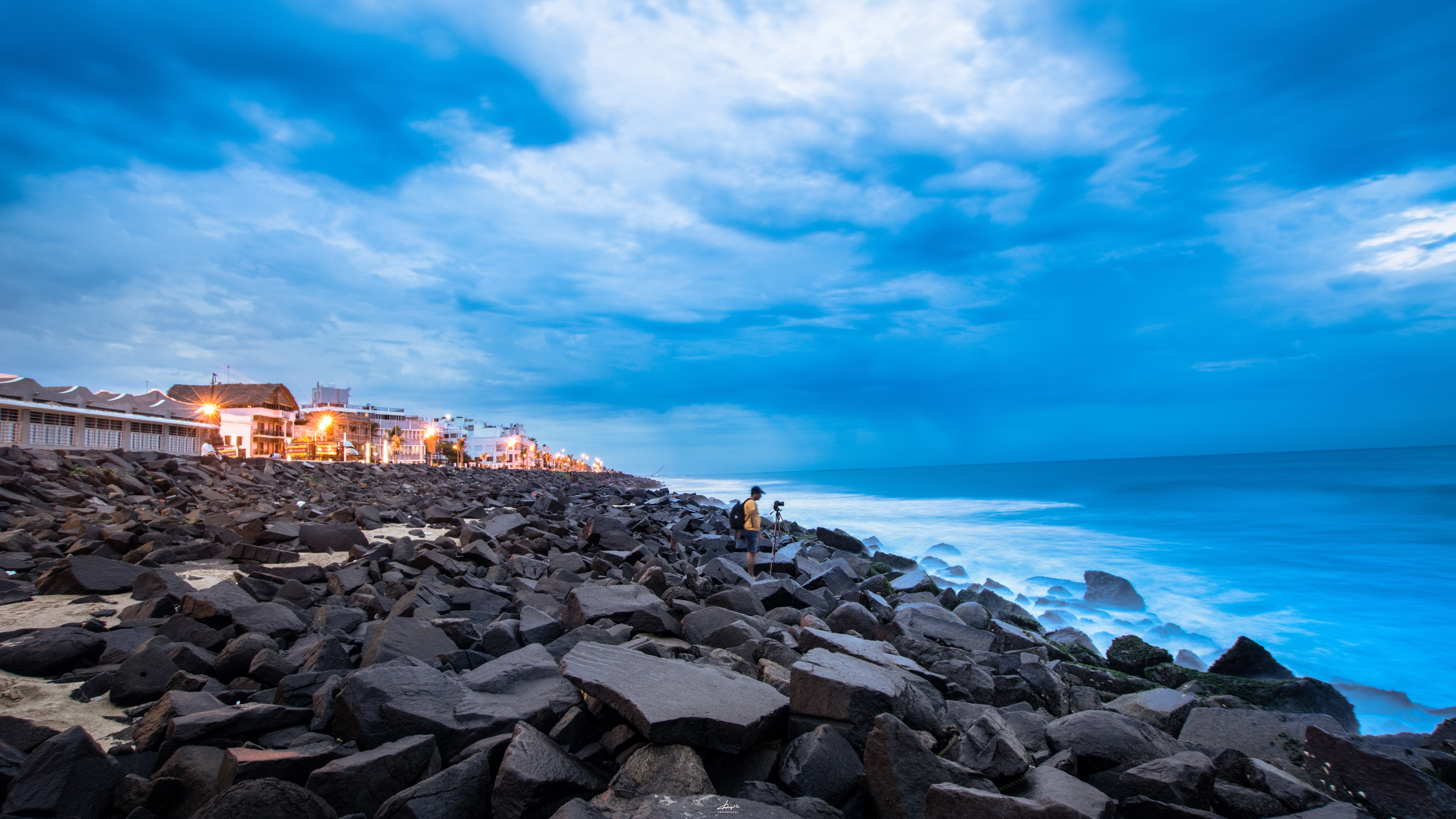
Long-exposure shot of Pondicherry beach road

In 2012, the Ministry of Power inaugurated the "Smart Grid" project in Puducherry. Farming around Pondicherry includes crops such as rice, pulses, sugarcane, coconuts, and cotton. In 2016, the Pondicherry State Government Employees Central Federation presented a status paper on the fiscal and social crisis in Puducherry to Union Home Minister Rajnath Singh. The report stated that a "combination of a staggering debt, stagnant tax revenues and rampant misappropriation of funds has throttled the economy of the Union Territory" and called for measures on a war footing to "deliver good governance and end corruption".

== Demographics ==
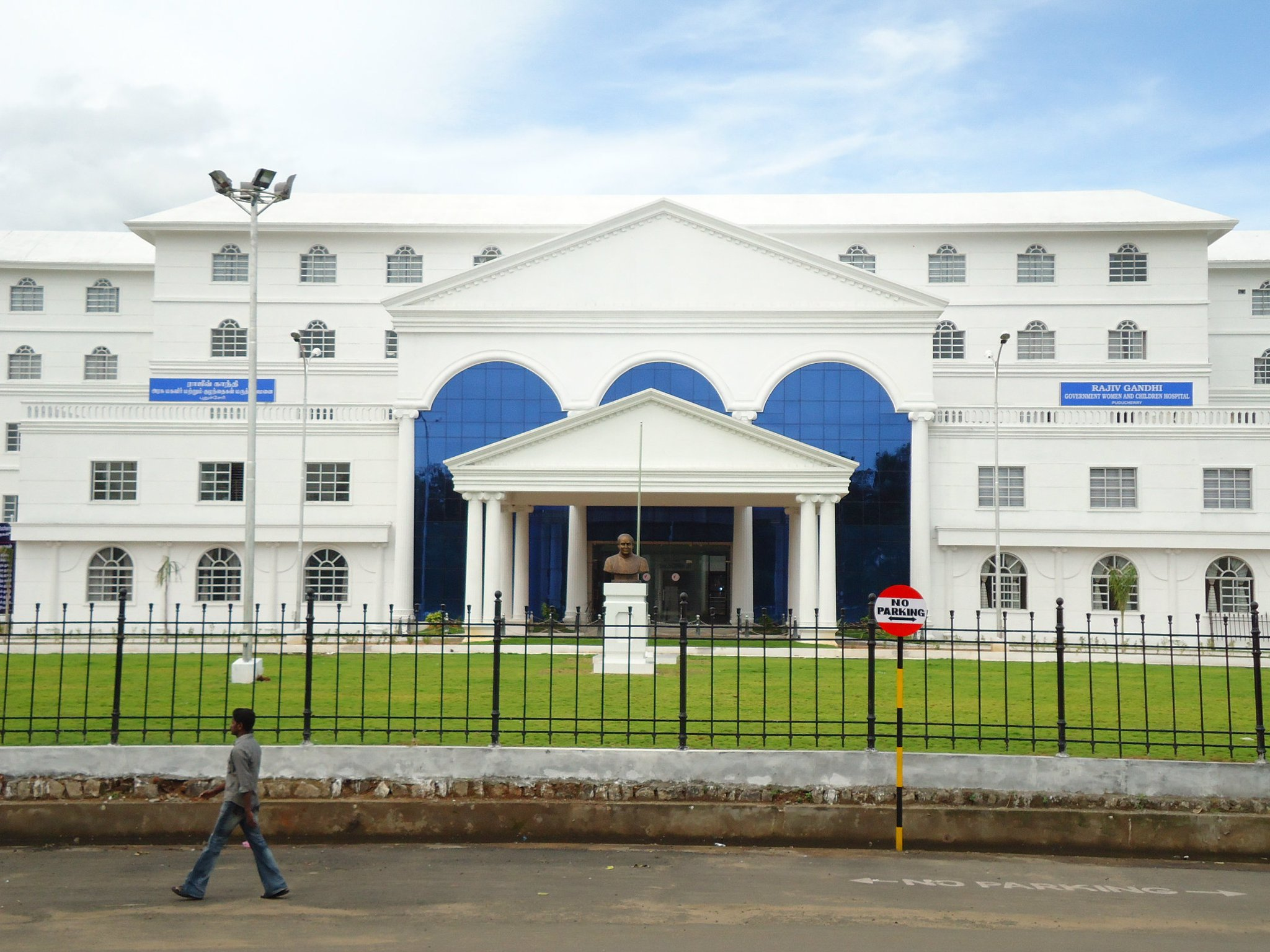
The Rajiv Gandhi Women and Children Hospital

According to the 2011 census of India, Pondicherry had a population of 244,377, with 124,947 females and 119,430 males. It had an average literacy rate of 80.6%, with male literacy at 84.6% and female literacy at 76.7%. Ten per cent of the population was under six years of age.

The majority of people in Pondicherry speak Tamil. There is a community of French people and a number of French institutions, such as a French consulate, the French Institute of Pondicherry, and L'Alliance française.

== Civic administration ==
The city of Puducherry comprises two municipalities, Puducherry and Uzhavarkarai. Both the municipalities and the commune panchayats in the Union Territory of Puducherry function under the administrative control of the local administration department. The Puducherry municipality, under the Puducherry district, comprises the former communes of Puducherry and Mudaliarpet, with its headquarters in Puducherry. It has a total of 42 wards spread over an area of 19.46 km^{2} (7.51 sq mi). Wards 1–10 are north of the city; wards 11–19 are in Boulevard Town, and the remaining wards are southwest of the city centre.

== Urban agglomeration ==
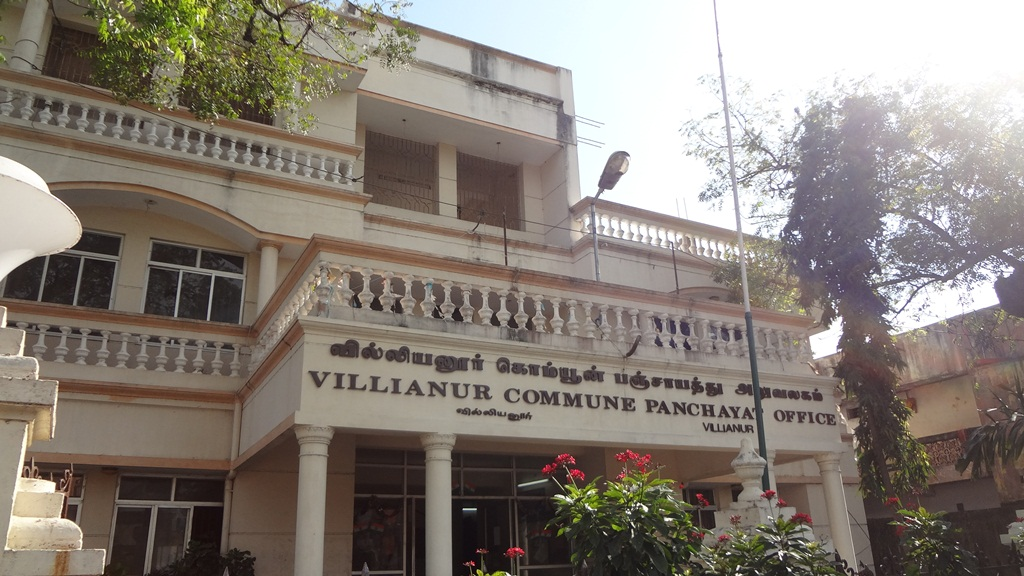
The administrative building of Villianur, one of the communes of Puducherry

Local bodies	Area	Population
Pondicherry Municipality	19 km^{2} (7.3 sq mi)	241,773
Oulgaret Municipality	36 km^{2} (14 sq mi)	300,028
Villianur Census Town and Outgrowth		67,254
Ariyankuppam Town and Outgrowth		47,454
Total	293 km^{2} (113 sq mi)	629,509

=== Data according to the 2011 census ===
There are two proposals by the Puducherry government, firstly to merge Pondicherry and Oulgaret municipalities and upgrade the Pondicherry municipality into a '"municipal corporation", and secondly to upgrade Villianur and Ariyankuppam commune panchayats into municipalities, which would increase the Pondicherry region's urban area around 155 km^{2} (60 sq mi) of the total 292 km^{2} (113 sq mi).

== Transport ==
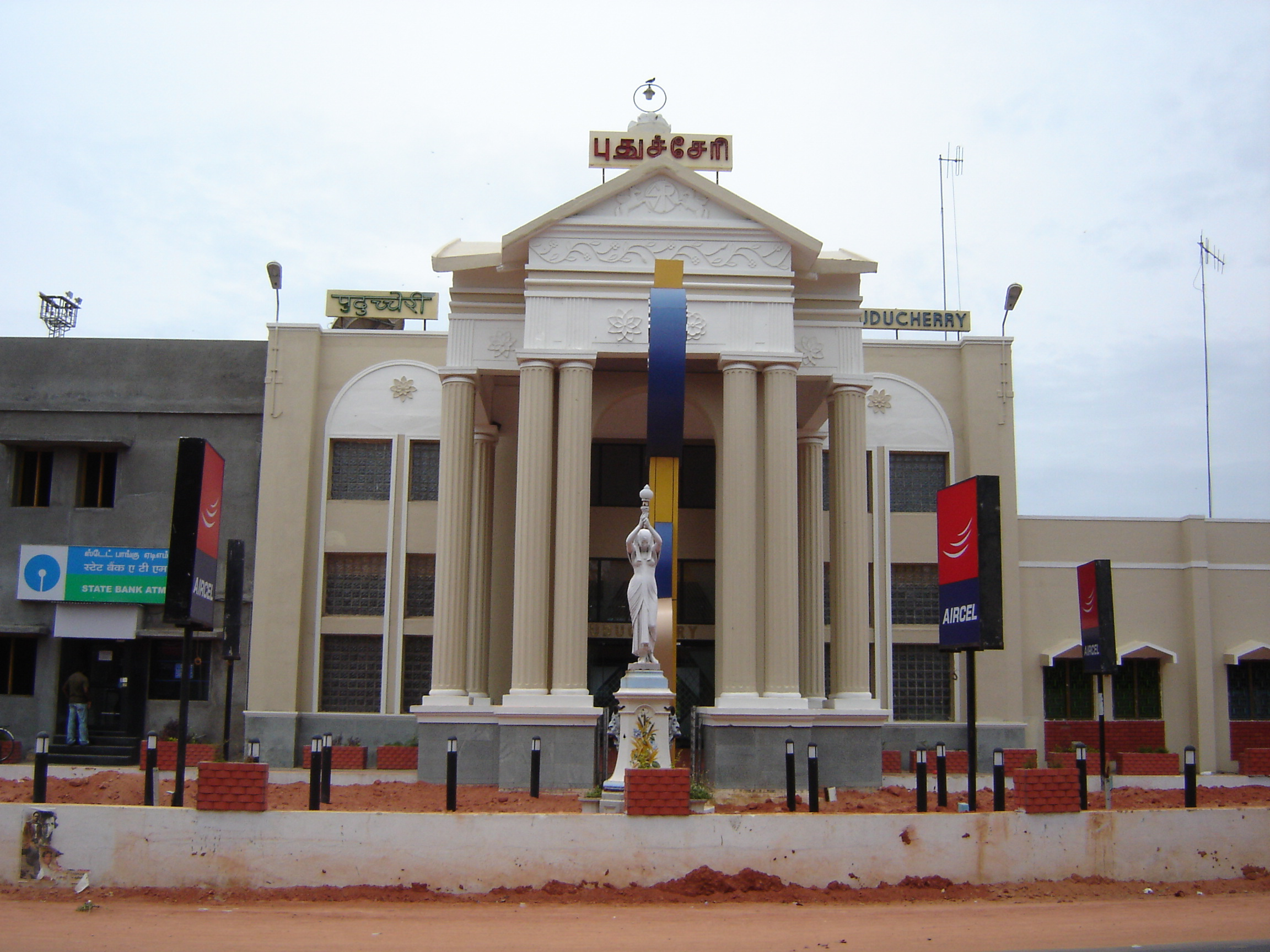
Puducherry Railway Station

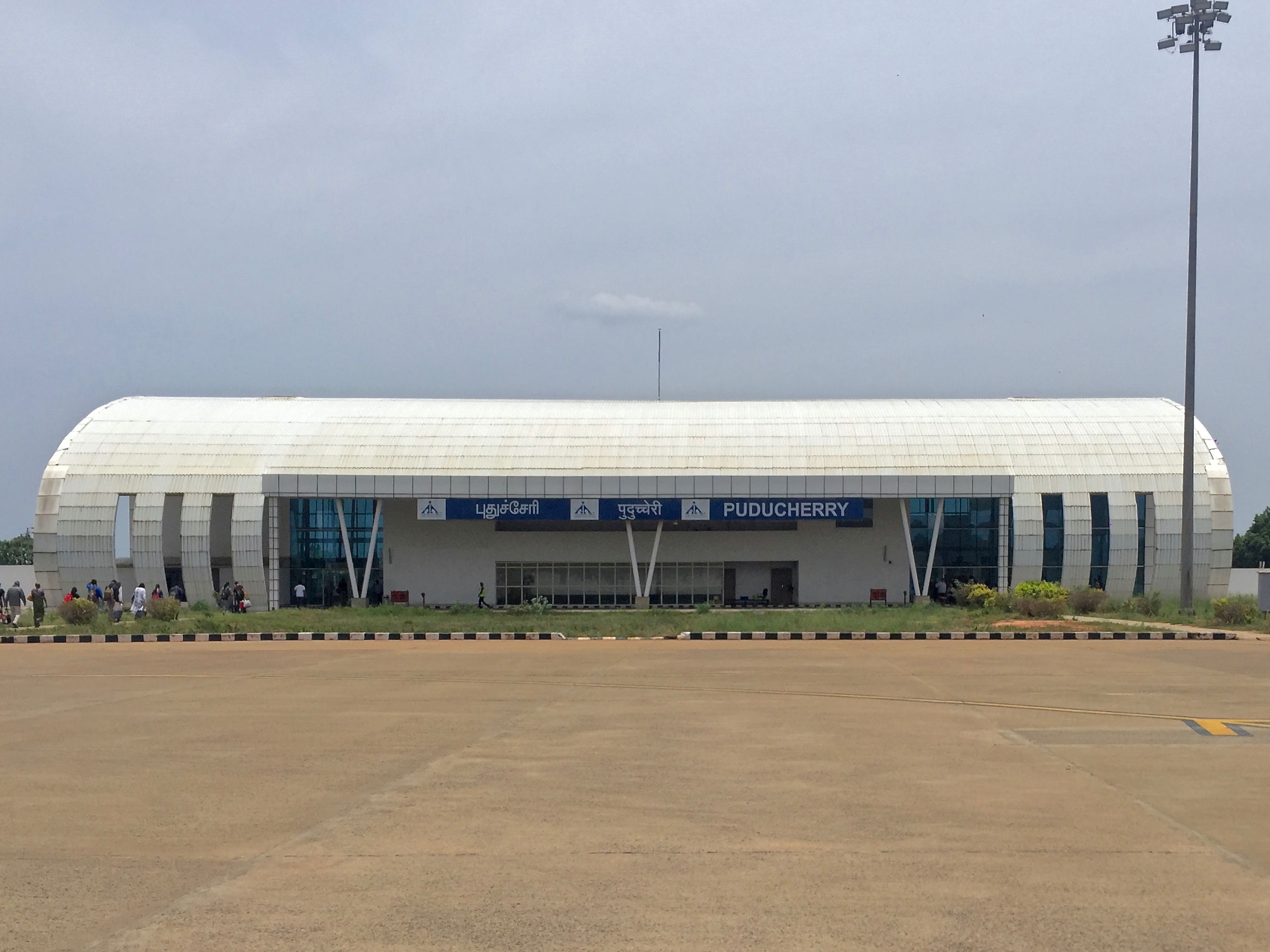
Pondicherry Airport

=== Road ===
Pondicherry is connected to Chennai via the East Coast Road through Mahabalipuram. There are daily bus services from several main stops from Chennai. The Pondicherry Road Transport Corporation runs buses within the city and outside. The Tamil Nadu State Transport Corporation operates air-conditioned bus services from Chennai to Pondicherry.

=== Rail ===
Pondicherry is connected by train to all major Indian cities, such as Chennai, Delhi, Kolkata (Howrah), Mumbai, Kanyakumari, Hyderabad, Nagpur, Bhubaneswar, Bengaluru, Visakhapatnam, and Mangalore. Moreover, Villupuram Junction, which is at a distance of around 24 miles (39 km), is connected to several other Indian cities.

=== Air ===
Pondicherry Airport is located at Lawspet, an Assembly Constituency in the Union Territory of Puducherry. It has direct flights to Hyderabad and Bengaluru.

== Tourism ==
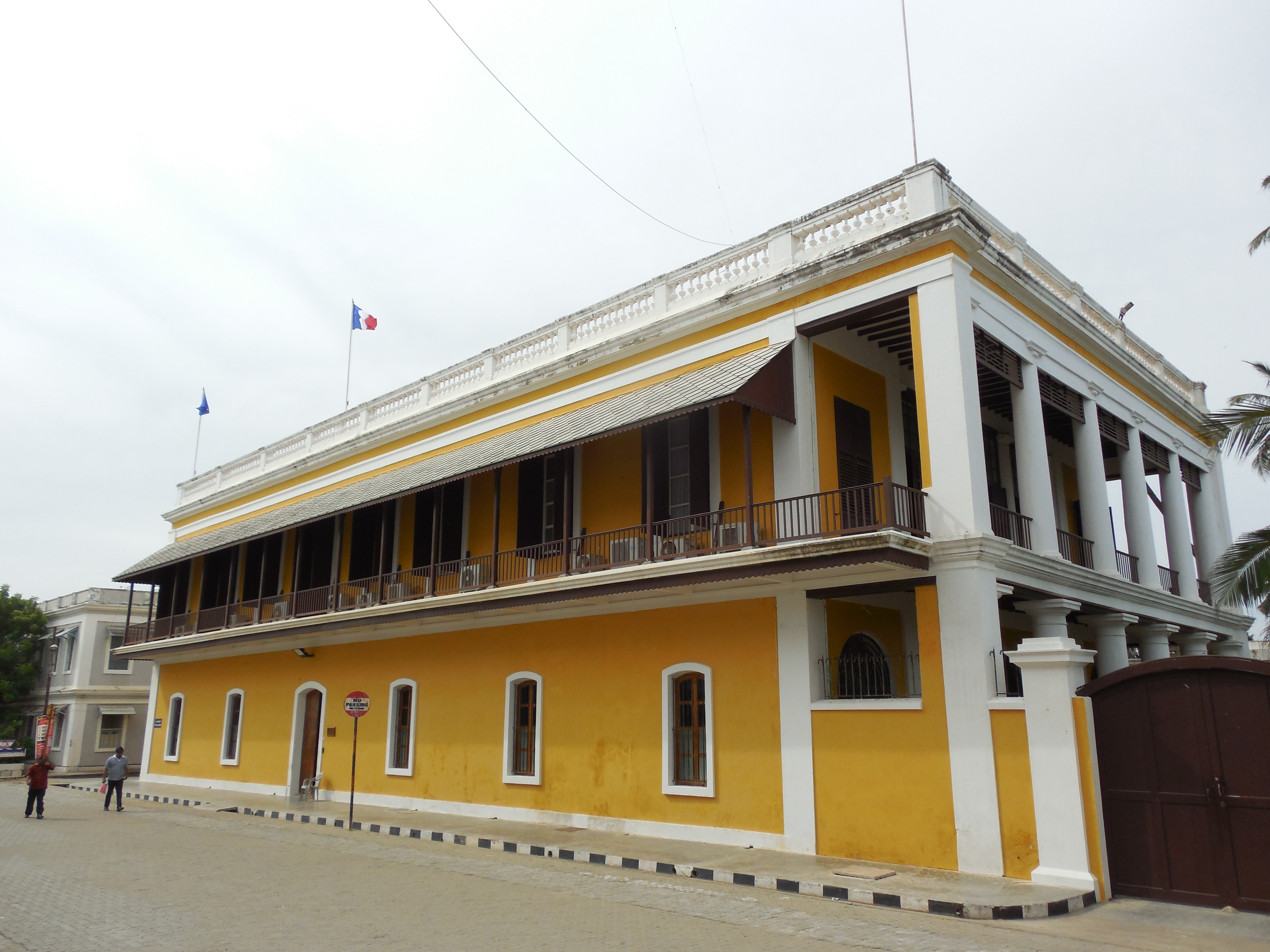
The French consulate in Pondicherry

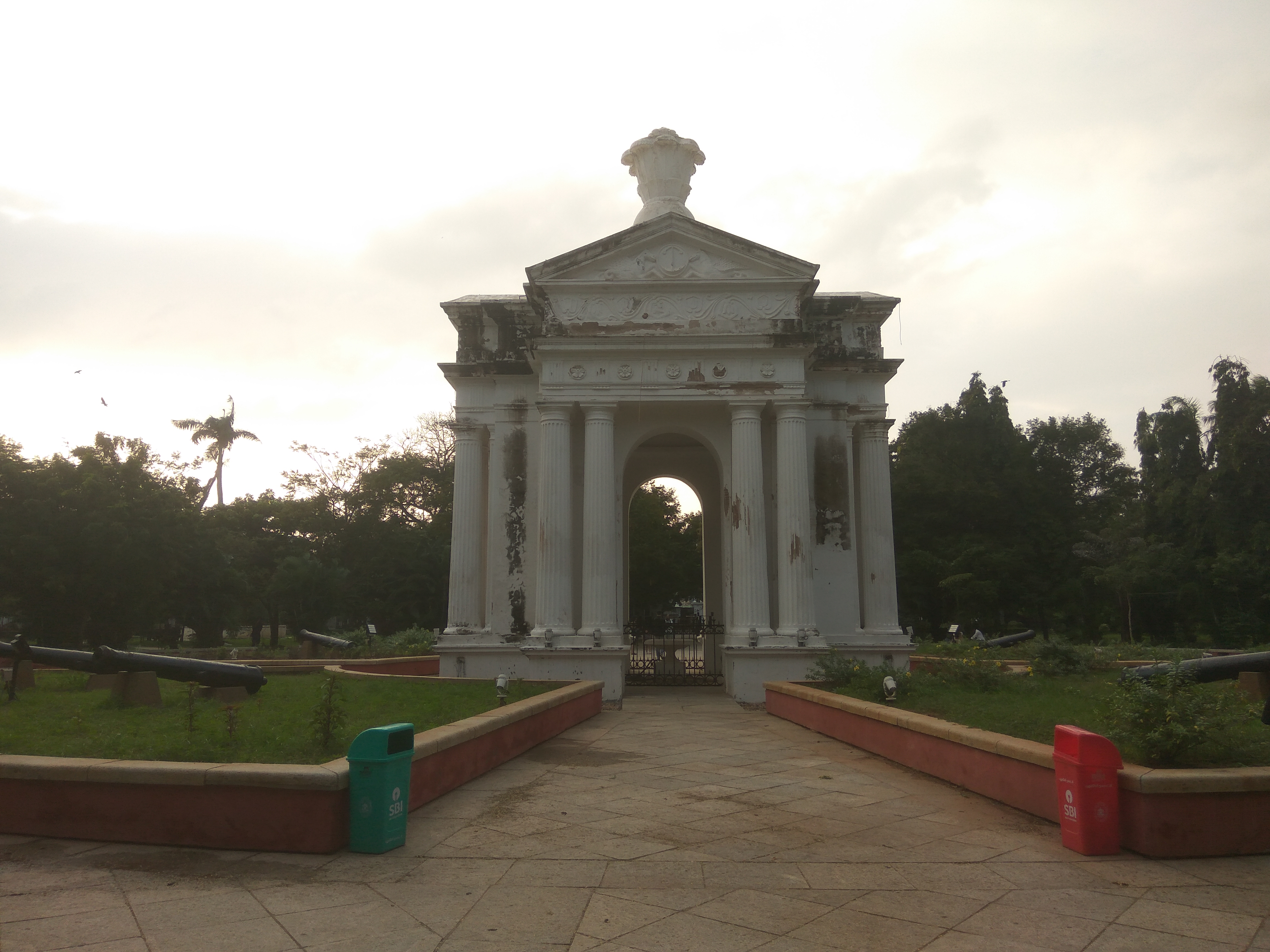
Aayi Mandapam (Park Monument) at Bharathi Park

Pondicherry is a tourist destination. The city has many colonial buildings, churches, temples, and statues which, combined with the town planning and French-style avenues in the old districts, still preserve much of the colonial ambiance.

While the sea is a draw for tourists, Pondicherry no longer has the sandy beaches that once graced its coastline. The breakwater to the harbour and other hard structures constructed on the shore caused extreme coastal erosion, and the sand from Pondicherry's Promenade Beach has disappeared entirely. As a result of the city's seawall and groyne construction, the beaches further up the coast to the north have also been lost. An enormous deposition of sand has accrued to the south of the harbour breakwater, but this is not a large beach and is not easily accessible from the city.

The government has taken steps to construct a reef and re-dose the sand. The sea is accessible by a small patch of land at Promenade Beach (Goubert Avenue). Moreover, the beach is one of the cleanest in India and has been selected for Blue Flag certification.

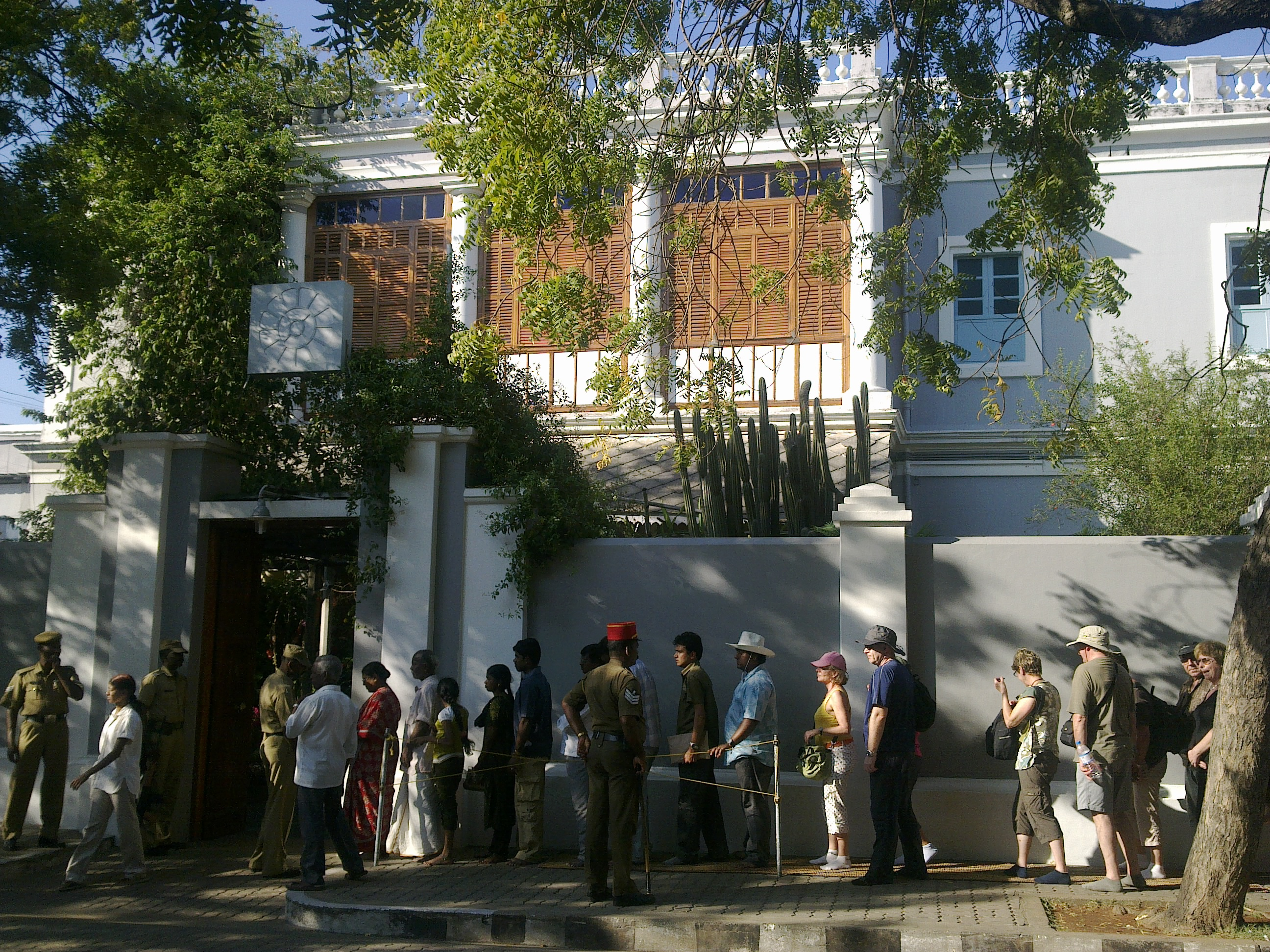
Visitors at the Sri Aurobindo Ashram

The Sri Aurobindo Ashram, located on Rue de la Marine, is one of the most important ashrams in India, founded by the freedom fighter and spiritual philosopher Sri Aurobindo. Auroville (City of Dawn) is an "experimental" township located 8 km (5.0 mi) northwest of Pondicherry.

There are a number of old and large churches in Pondicherry, most of which were built in the 18th and 19th centuries. A number of heritage buildings and monuments are present around Promenade Beach, such as the Children's Park and Dupleix Statue, Gandhi statue, Nehru statue, Le Café, French War Memorial, 19th Century Light House, Bharathi Park, Governors Palace, Romain Rolland Library, Legislative Assembly, Pondicherry Museum, and the French Institute of Pondicherry at Saint Louis Street.

Puducherry Botanical Gardens is located south of the New Bus Stand. Chunnambar Backwater resort is 8 km (5.0 mi)from Pondicherry, along Cuddalore Main Road. This tropical resort is flanked by a creek on one side.

Arulmigu Manakula Vinayagar Devasthanam on Manakula Vinayagar Street is a Hindu temple to Ganesha. Sri Manakula Vinayagar Temple was in existence before the French came and settled in Pondicherry in 1666.

Sengazhuneer Amman at Veerampattinam village is one of the oldest temples in Pondicherry, situated about 7 km (4.3 mi) away from the city centre. The car festival conducted in mid-August is famous in Puducherry and other neighbouring states. The festival takes place on the fifth Friday since the commencement of the Tamil month of 'Aadi' every year.

Thirukaameeswarar Temple is located in a rural town called Villianur, located about 10 km (6.2 mi), towards Villupuram.

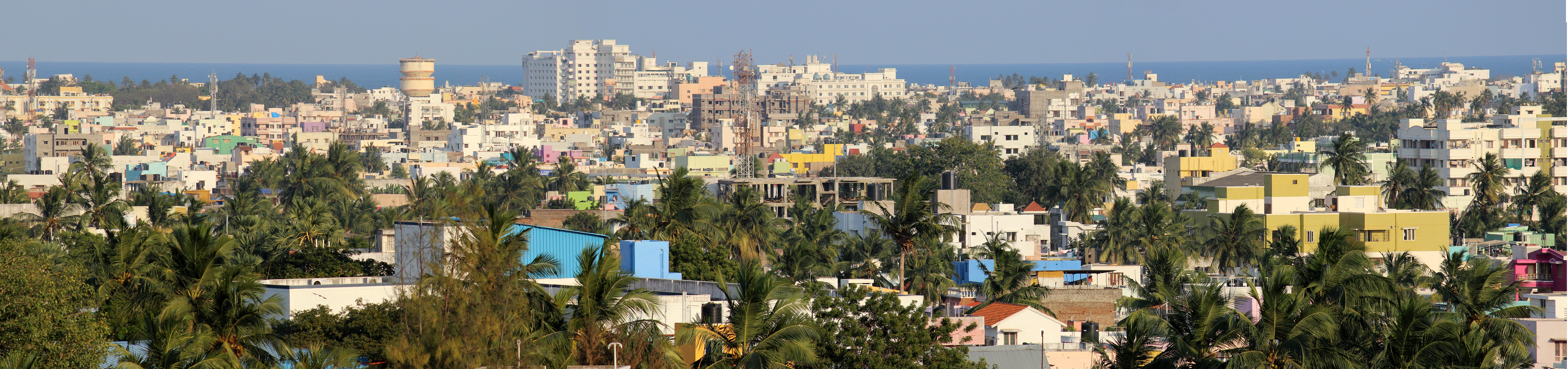
Panoramic view of Pondicherry

== Issues ==
Pondicherry struggles with a high poverty rate, issues of women's safety, inadequate road infrastructure, dirty beaches, lack of sewage infrastructure, air pollution, and sex crimes. Bureaucrats, including former lieutenant governor Kiran Bedi, have accused local administrative officers of neglecting proper administration and of corruption.

== Notable people ==
=== Leaders ===
- V. Venkatasubba Reddiar, politician
- V. Subbiah, trade union leader and freedom fighter

=== Literature and arts ===
- Anandaraj, actor
- Bharathidasan, Tamil poet
- Suzanne Karpelès, poet
- Kalki Koechlin, actress

=== Science and technology ===
- Yvonne Artaud, French educationalist and psychologist
- Navi Radjou, innovation and leadership strategist based in Silicon Valley
- Ganapathi Thanikaimoni, scientist and director of the Palynology laboratory of the French Institute of Pondicherry

=== Environmental conservation ===
- T. Srinivasa Rao and R. Gnanasekaran – twin brothers who promoted world peace and environmental conservation

=== Armed forces ===
- Jacques Lauriston (1768–1828), senior-ranking military commander in the French Army, born in Pondicherry

== Popular culture ==
- Prince Pondicherry, a character from Roald Dahl's Charlie and the Chocolate Factory, named after the city
- Pondicherry is the setting for the first third of Yann Martel's 2001 Booker Prize-winning novel, Life of Pi. A portion of the subsequent film adaptation was filmed there.
- Lee Langley's 1995 novel, A House in Pondicherry is set here.

== Educational institutions ==
- Jawaharlal Institute of Postgraduate Medical Education and Research
- Lycée français de Pondichéry
- Pondicherry Institute of Medical Sciences
- Pondicherry University
- Puducherry Technological University
- Rajiv Gandhi College of Veterinary and Animal Sciences

== Gallery ==
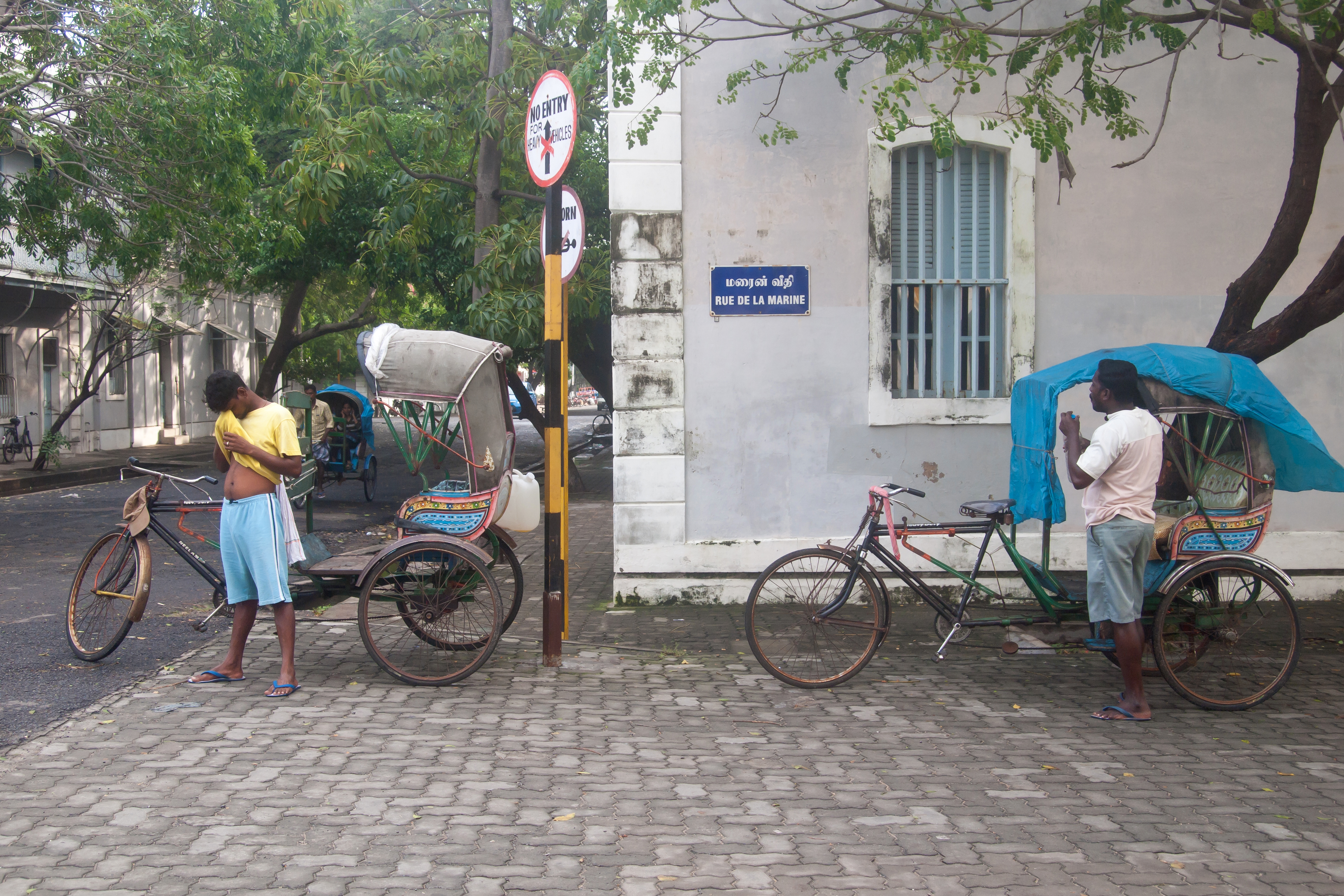
Rue De La Marine

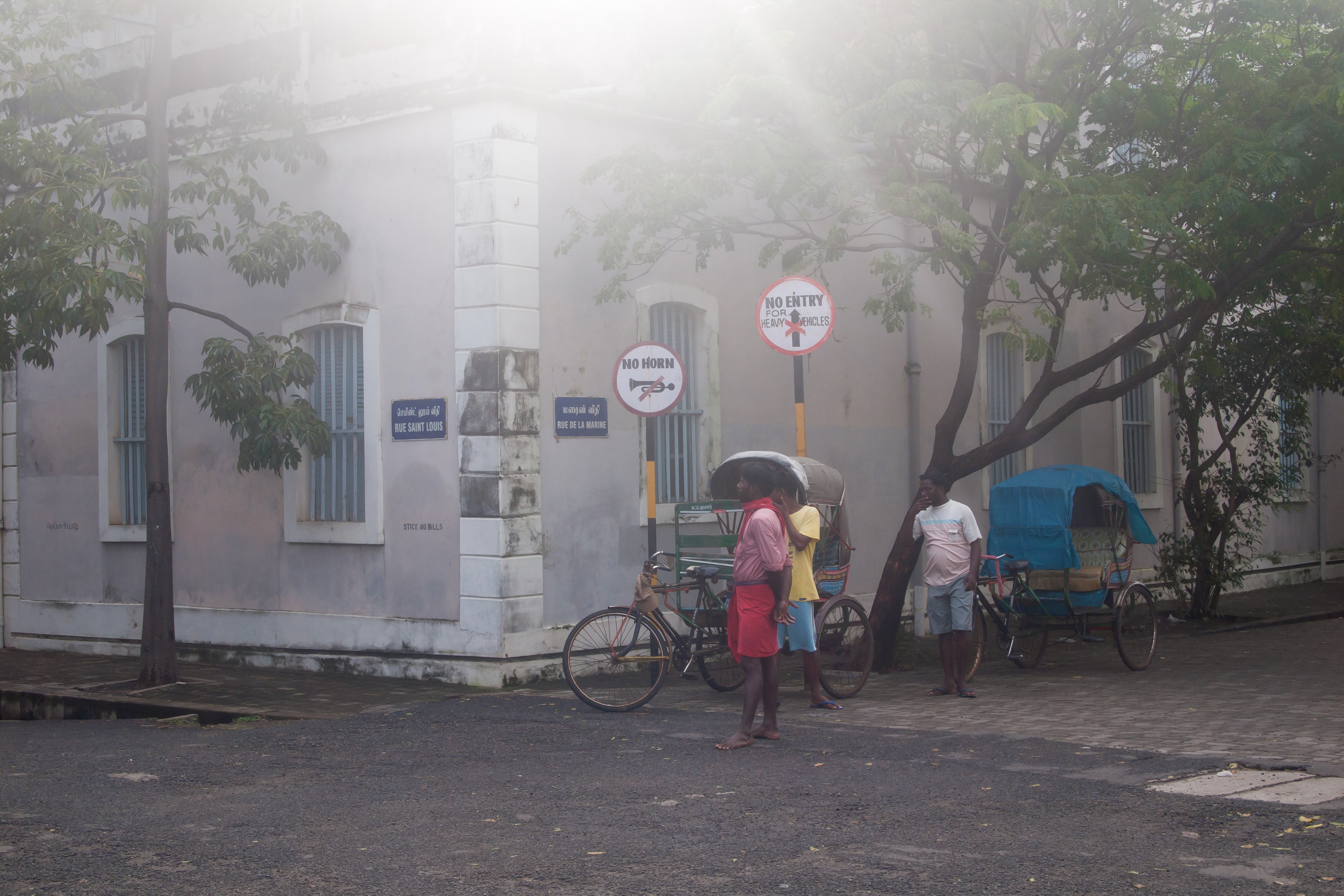
Rue Saint Louis

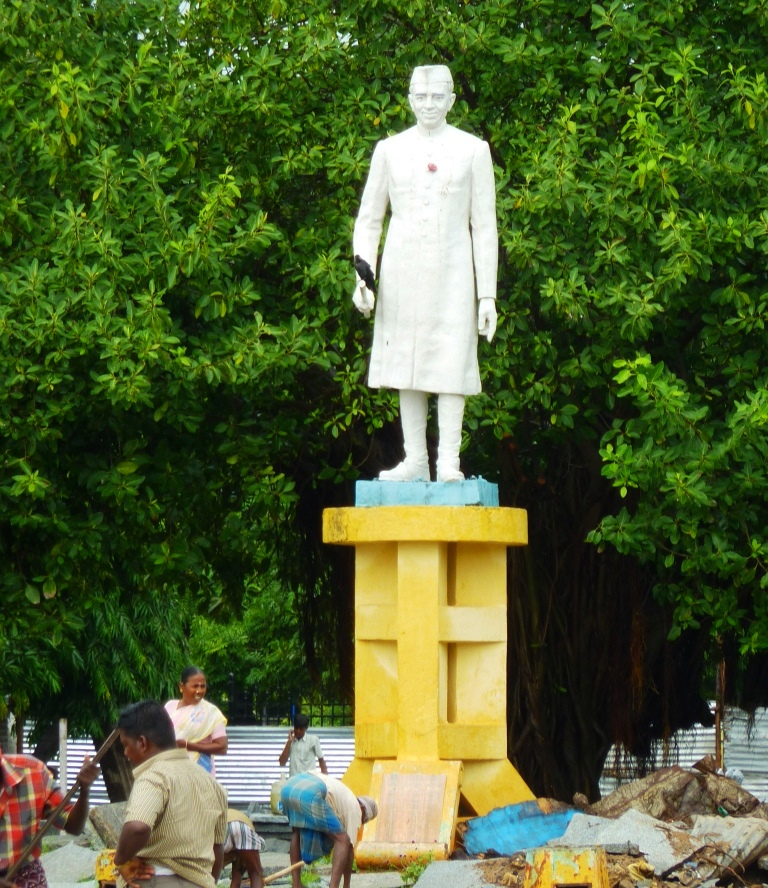
Nehru Statue

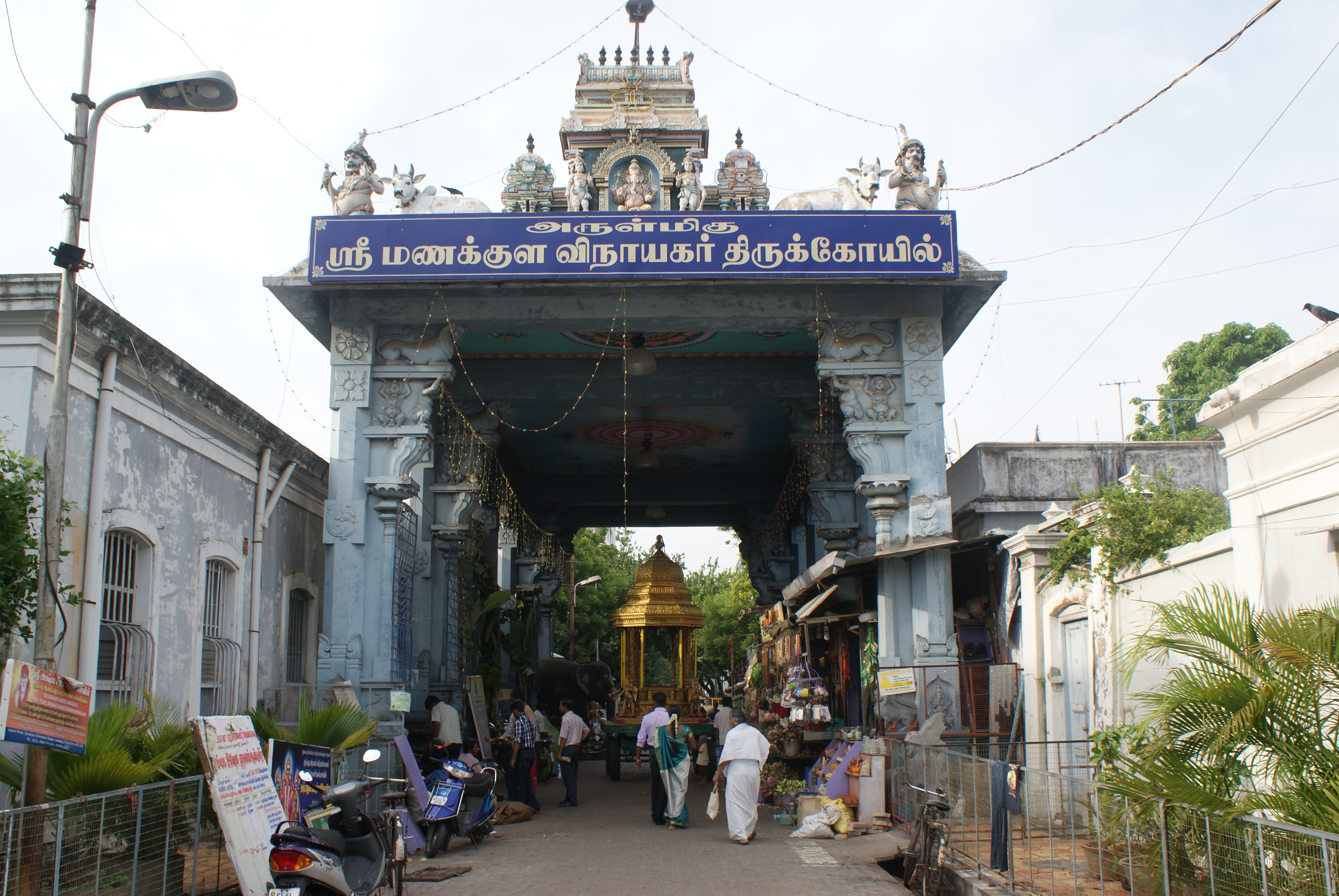
Gate leading into Manakula Vinayagar Temple in White Town

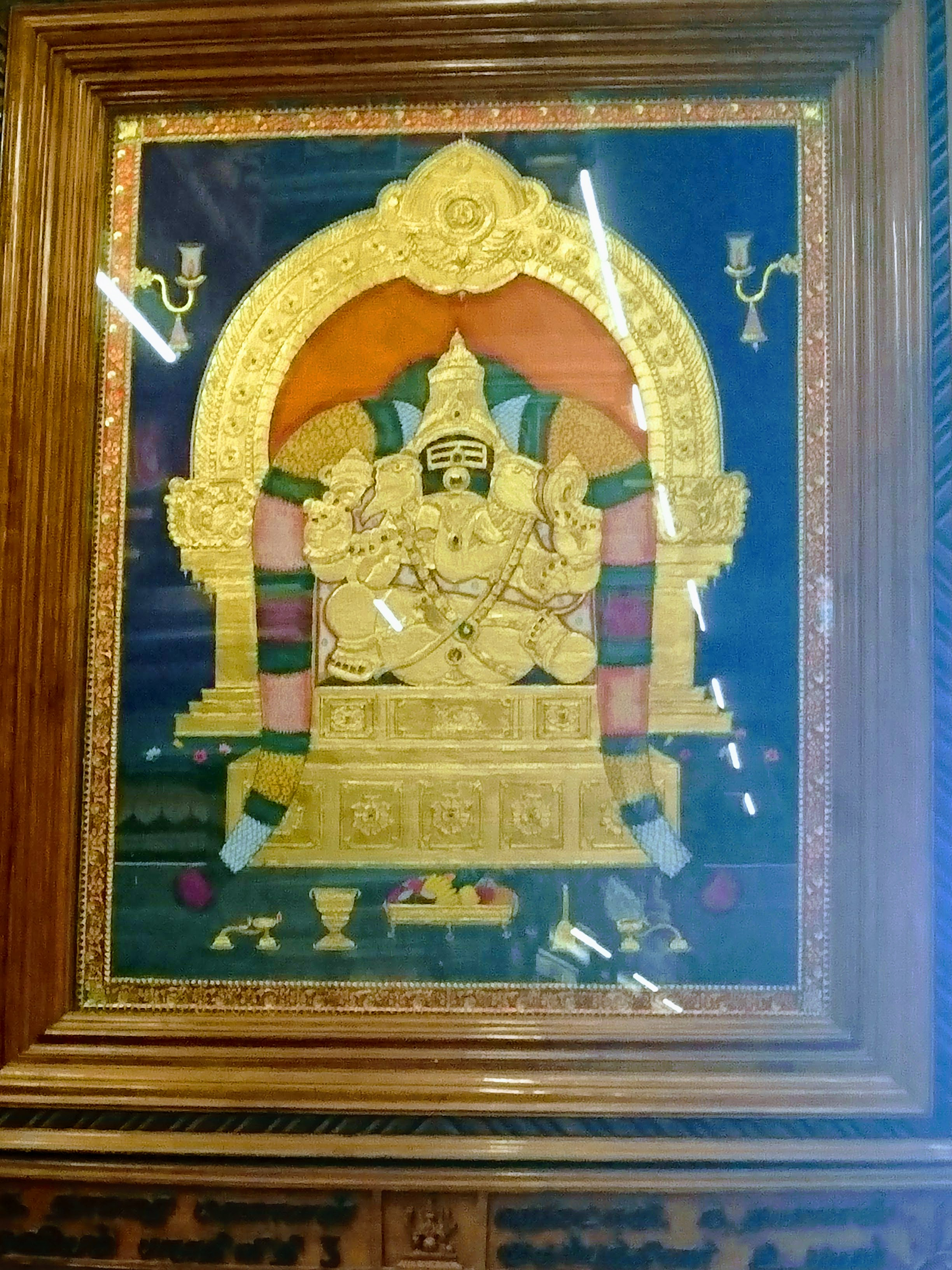
Tanjore painting of Manakula Vinayagar

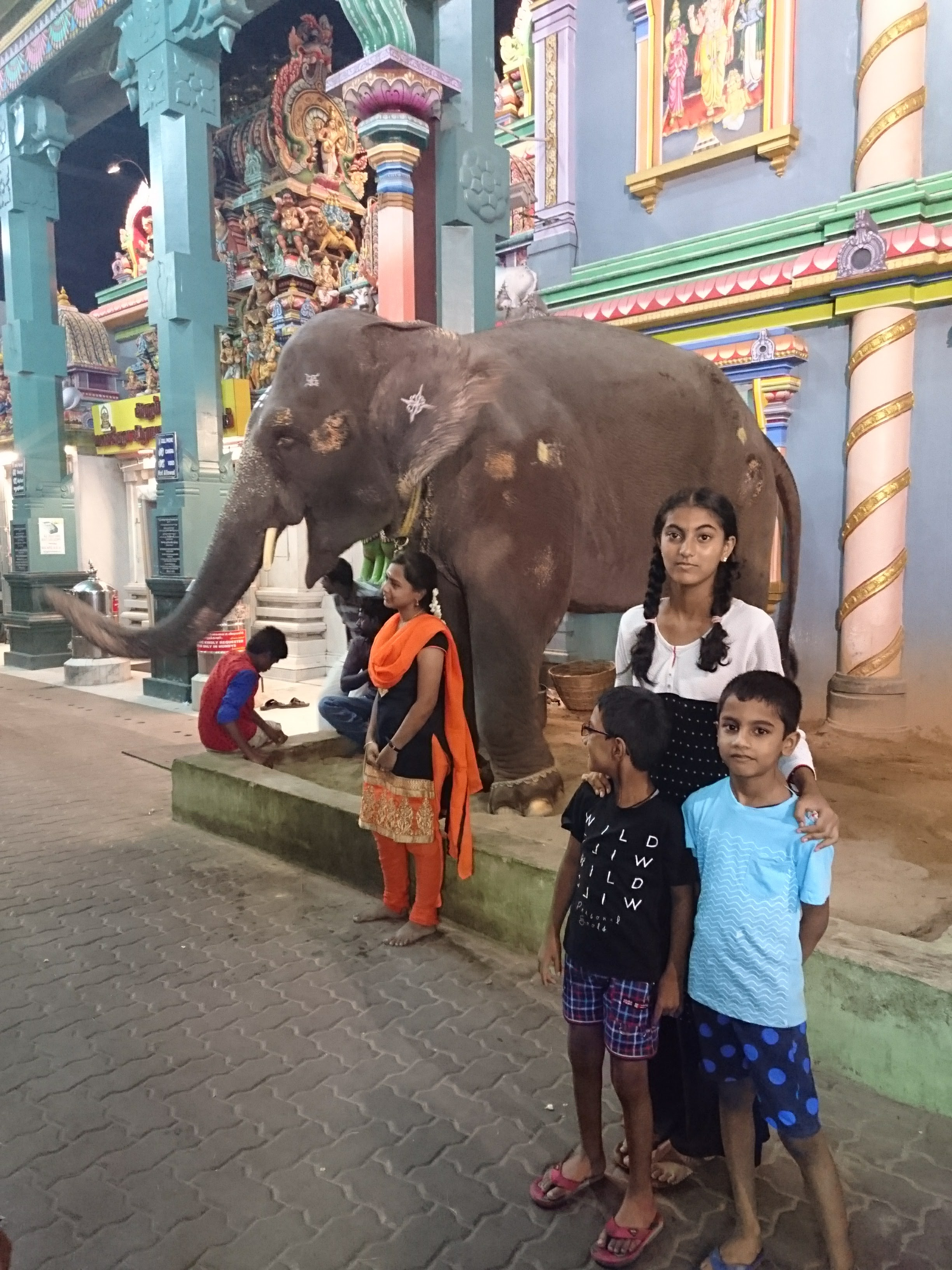
Devotees with Elephant Lakshmi in Manakula Vinayagar Temple

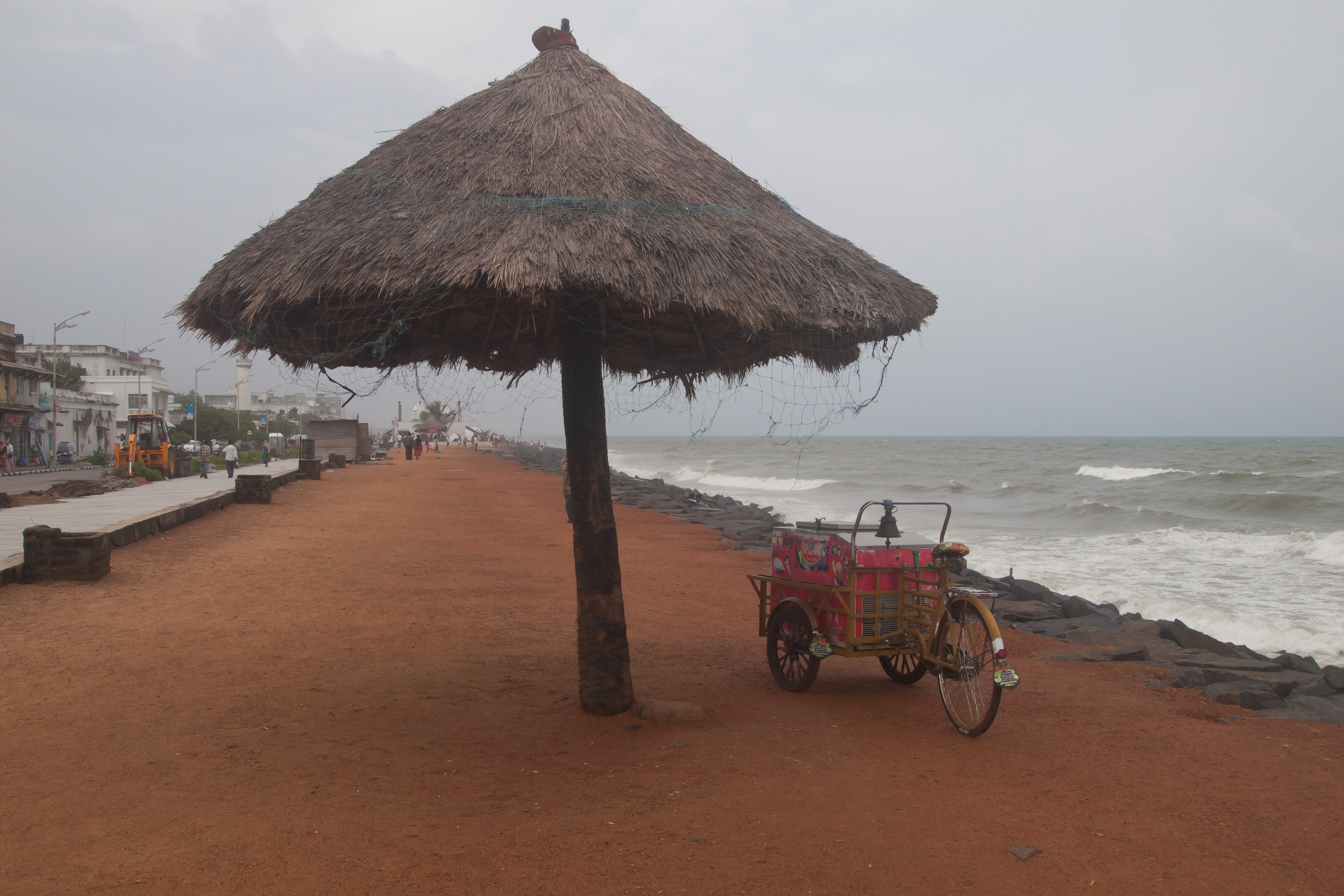
Beach by the Bay of Bengal

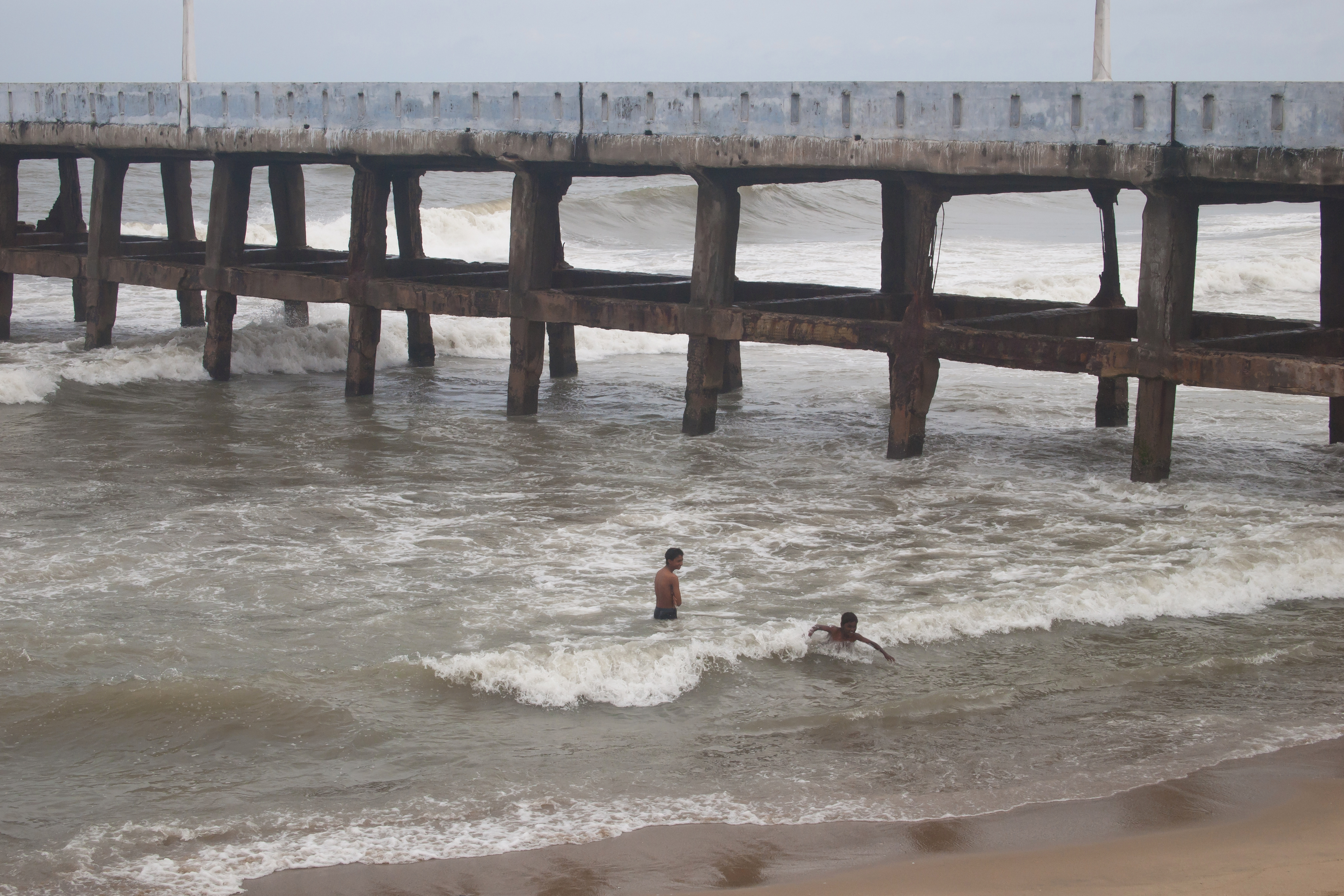
Bay of Bengal

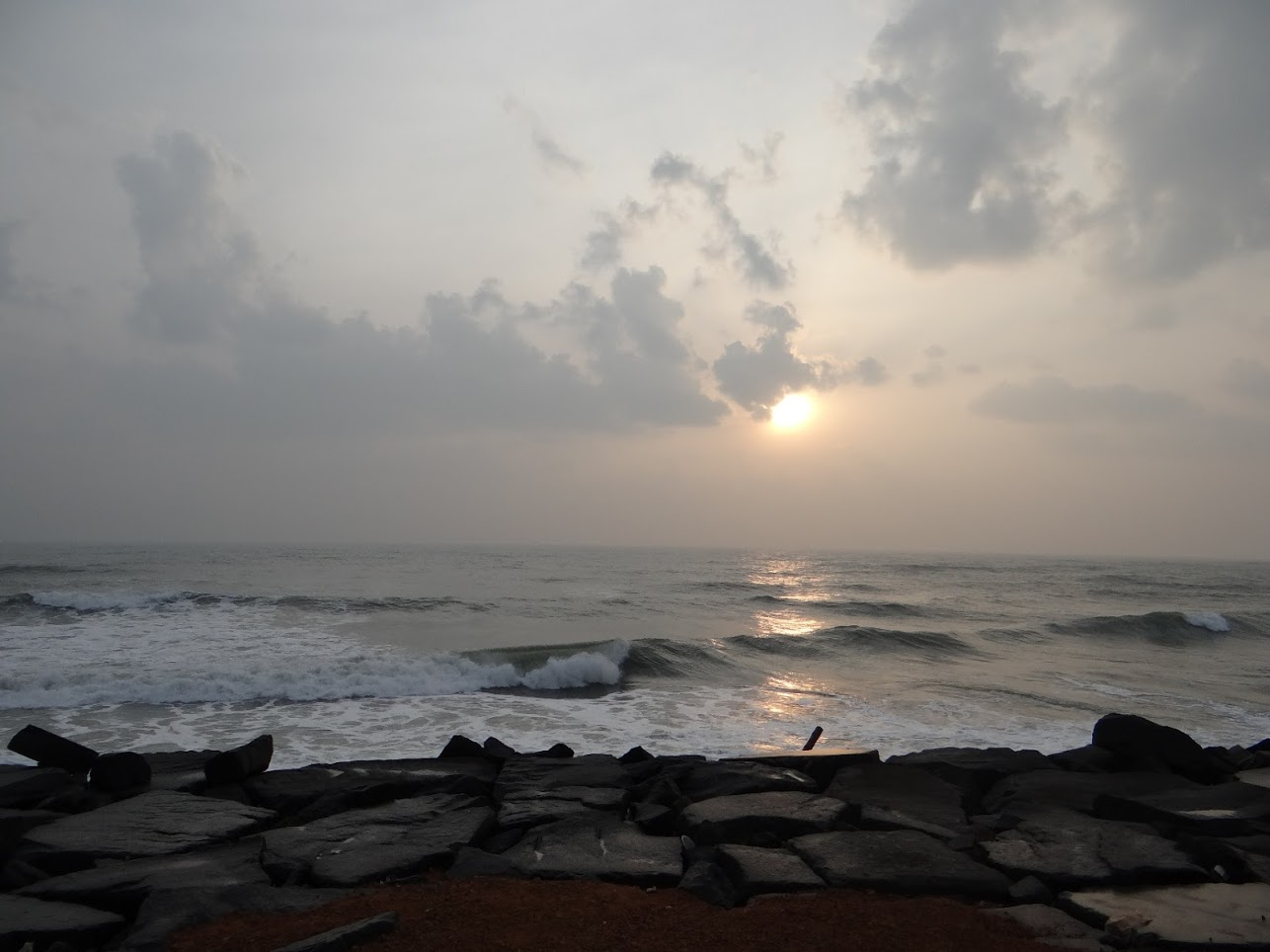
Early morning by the Bay of Bengal

== See also ==
- Karaikal, India
- Mahé, India
- Manakula Vinayagar Temple
- Yanam, India
