= List of diplomatic missions in Paris =

This is a list of the 163 resident embassies in Paris. For other diplomatic missions in France, see List of diplomatic missions in France.

== Embassies ==
Country	Address	Area	Image	Website
Afghanistan	32, avenue Raphaël	16th arrondissement		
Albania	57, avenue Marceau	16th arrondissement		
Algeria	50, rue de Lisbonne	8th arrondissement		
Andorra	1, place d'Andorre	16th arrondissement		
Angola	19, avenue Foch	16th arrondissement		
Antigua and Barbuda	31, rue François Bonvin	15th arrondissement		
Argentina	6, rue Cimarosa	16th arrondissement		
Armenia	9, rue Viète	17th arrondissement		
Australia	4, rue Jean-Rey	15th arrondissement		
Austria	6, rue Fabert	7th arrondissement		
Azerbaijan	78, avenue d'Iéna	16th arrondissement		
Bahrain	3 bis place des États-Unis	16th arrondissement		
Bangladesh	109, avenue Henri-Martin	16th arrondissement		
Belarus	38, boulevard Suchet	16th arrondissement		
Belgium	9, rue de Tilsitt	17th arrondissement		
Benin	87, avenue Victor-Hugo	16th arrondissement		
Bolivia	12, avenue du Président-Kennedy	16th arrondissement		
Bosnia and Herzegovina	174, rue de Courcelles	17th arrondissement		
Botswana	121, Av. de Malakoff	16th arrondissement		
Brazil	34, cours Albert-Ier	8th arrondissement		
Brunei	7, rue de Presbourg	16th arrondissement		
Bulgaria	1, avenue Rapp	7th arrondissement		
Burkina Faso	159, boulevard Haussmann	8th arrondissement		
Burundi	10-12, rue de l'Orme	19th arrondissement		
Cambodia	4, rue Adolphe-Yvon	16th arrondissement		
Cameroon	73 rue d'Auteuil	16th arrondissement		
Canada	130, rue du Faubourg-Saint-Honoré	8th arrondissement		
Cape Verde	3, rue de Rigny	8th arrondissement		
Central African Republic	30, rue des Perchamps	16th arrondissement		
Chad	65, rue des Belles-Feuilles	16th arrondissement		
Chile	2, avenue de La Motte-Picquet	7th arrondissement		
China	20, rue Monsieur	7th arrondissement		
Colombia	22, rue de l'Élysée	8th arrondissement		
Comoros	20, rue Marbeau	16th arrondissement		
Democratic Republic of Congo	32, cours Albert-Ier	8th arrondissement		
Republic of Congo	37, bis rue Paul-Valéry	16th arrondissement		
Costa Rica	4, square Rapp	7th arrondissement		
Croatia	7, square Thiers	16th arrondissement		
Cuba	16, rue de Presles	15th arrondissement		
Cyprus	23, rue Galilée	16th arrondissement		
Czech Republic	15, avenue Charles-Floquet	7th arrondissement		
Denmark	77, avenue Marceau	16th arrondissement		
Djibouti	26, rue Émile-Menier	16th arrondissement		
Dominican Republic	45, rue de Courcelles	8th arrondissement		
Ecuador	50, Rue Copernic	16th arrondissement		
Egypt	56, avenue d'Iéna	16th arrondissement		
El Salvador	12, rue Galilée	16th arrondissement		
Equatorial Guinea	42, avenue Foch	16th arrondissement		
Eritrea	1, rue de Staël	15th arrondissement		
Estonia	17, rue de La Baume	8th arrondissement		
Ethiopia	35, avenue Charles-Floquet	7th arrondissement		
Finland	1, place de Finlande	7th arrondissement		
Gabon	26, bis avenue Raphaël	16th arrondissement		
Gambia	7, ter rue Léonard-de-Vinci	16th arrondissement		
Georgia	8, rue Brémontier	17th arrondissement		
Germany	13-15, avenue Franklin-D.-Roosevelt	8th arrondissement		
Ghana	21, boulevard de la Saussaye	Neuilly-sur-Seine		
Greece	17, rue Auguste-Vacquerie	16th arrondissement		
Guatemala	7, avenue Niel	17th arrondissement		
Guinea	51, rue de la Faisanderie	16th arrondissement		
Guinea-Bissau	94, rue Saint-Lazare	9th arrondissement		
Haiti	10, rue Théodule-Ribot	17th arrondissement		
Holy See	10, avenue du Président-Wilson	16th arrondissement		
Honduras	8, rue Crevaux	16th arrondissement		
Hungary	5 bis, square de l'Avenue-Foch	16th arrondissement		
Iceland	52, avenue Victor-Hugo	16th arrondissement		
India	15, rue Alfred-Dehodencq	16th arrondissement		
Indonesia	47-49, rue Cortambert	16th arrondissement		
Iran	4, avenue d'Iéna	16th arrondissement		
Iraq	64, avenue Foch	16th arrondissement		
Ireland	2-4, rue Rude et 12 avenue Foch	16th arrondissement		
Israel	3, rue Rabelais	8th arrondissement		
Italy	51, rue de Varenne	7th arrondissement		
Ivory Coast	102, avenue Raymond-Poincaré	16th arrondissement		
Japan	7, avenue Hoche	8th arrondissement		
Jordan	80 boulevard Maurice-Barrès	Neuilly-sur-Seine		
Kazakhstan	3, rue de Tilsitt	8th arrondissement		
Kenya	3, rue Freycinet	16th arrondissement		
Kosovo	7, rue de Monceau	8th arrondissement		
Kuwait	2, rue de Lübeck	16th arrondissement		
Kyrgyzstan	49, rue de Bellechasse	7th arrondissement		
Laos	74, avenue Raymond-Poincaré	16th arrondissement		
Latvia	6, villa Saïd	16th arrondissement		
Lebanon	3, villa Copernic	16th arrondissement		
Liberia	12, place du Général-Catroux	17th arrondissement		
Libya	6-8, rue Chasseloup-Laubat	15th arrondissement		
Lithuania	22, boulevard de Courcelles	17th arrondissement		
Luxembourg	33, avenue Rapp	7th arrondissement		
Madagascar	4, avenue Raphaël	16th arrondissement		
Malaysia	2 bis, rue Benouville	16th arrondissement		
Mali	89, rue du Cherche-Midi	6th arrondissement		
Malta	23, rue d'Artois	8th arrondissement		
Mauritania	5, rue de Montevideo	16th arrondissement		
Mauritius	127, rue de Tocqueville	17th arrondissement		
Mexico	9, rue de Longchamp	16th arrondissement		
Moldova	95, Boulevard Berthier	17th arrondissement		
Monaco	22, boulevard Suchet	16th arrondissement		
Mongolia	5, avenue Robert-Schuman	Boulogne-Billancourt		
Montenegro	90, boulevard Flandrin	16th arrondissement		
Morocco	5, rue Le Tasse	16th arrondissement		
Mozambique	82, rue Laugier	17th arrondissement		
Myanmar	60, rue de Courcelles	8th arrondissement		
Namibia	42, rue Boileau	16th arrondissement		
Nepal	45 bis, rue des Acacias	17th arrondissement		
Netherlands	7-9, rue Éblé	7th arrondissement		
New Zealand	103, rue de Grenelle	7th arrondissement		
Nicaragua	34, avenue Bugeaud	16th arrondissement		
Niger	154, rue de Longchamp	16th arrondissement		
Nigeria	173, avenue Victor-Hugo	16th arrondissement		
North Macedonia	5, rue de la Faisanderie	16th arrondissement		
Norway	28, rue Bayard	8th arrondissement		
Oman	50, avenue d'Iéna	16th arrondissement		
Pakistan	18, rue Lord-Byron	8th arrondissement		
Palestine	14, rue du Commandant Léandri	15th arrondissement		
Panama	145, avenue de Suffren	15th arrondissement		
Paraguay	1, rue Saint-Dominique	7th arrondissement		
Peru	50, avenue Kléber	16th arrondissement		
Philippines	4, hameau de Boulainvilliers	16th arrondissement		
Poland	1, rue de Talleyrand	7th arrondissement		
Portugal	3, rue de Noisiel	16th arrondissement		
Qatar	1, rue de Tilsitt	8th arrondissement		
Romania	5, rue de l'Exposition	7th arrondissement		
Russia	40-50, boulevard Lannes	16th arrondissement		
Rwanda	12, rue Jadin	17th arrondissement		
San Marino	5, avenue Gourgaud	17th arrondissement		
Saudi Arabia	92, rue de Courcelles	8th arrondissement		
Senegal	14, avenue Robert-Schuman	7th arrondissement		
Serbia	5, rue Léonard-de-Vinci	16th arrondissement		
Seychelles	51, avenue Mozart	16th arrondissement		
Sierra Leone	7, ter rue Léonard de Vinci	16th arrondissement		
Singapore	16, rue Murillo	8th arrondissement		
Slovakia	125, rue du Ranelagh	16th arrondissement		
Slovenia	28, rue Bois-Le-Vent	16th arrondissement		
Somalia	26, rue Dumont-d'Urville	16th arrondissement		
South Africa	59, quai d'Orsay	7th arrondissement		
South Korea	125, rue de Grenelle	7th arrondissement		
South Sudan	9, rue Kepler	16th arrondissement		
Spain	22, avenue Marceau	8th arrondissement		
Sri Lanka	16, rue Spontini	16th arrondissement		
Sudan	11, rue Alfred-Dehodencq	16th arrondissement		
Suriname	94, Rue du Ranelagh	16th arrondissement		
Sweden	17, rue Barbet-de-Jouy	7th arrondissement		
Switzerland	142, rue de Grenelle, Hôtel de Besenval	7th arrondissement		
Syria	20, rue Vaneau	7th arrondissement		
Tajikistan	42 avenue Montaigne	8th arrondissement		
Tanzania	7, ter rue Léonard-de-Vinci	16th arrondissement		
Thailand	8, rue Greuze	16th arrondissement		
Togo	8, rue Alfred-Roll	17th arrondissement		
Tunisia	25, rue Barbet-de-Jouy	7th arrondissement		
Turkey	16, avenue de Lamballe	16th arrondissement		
Turkmenistan	13, rue Picot	16th arrondissement		
Uganda	13, avenue Raymond-Poincaré	16th arrondissement		
Ukraine	21, avenue de Saxe	7th arrondissement		
United Arab Emirates	2, boulevard de La Tour-Maubourg	7th arrondissement		
United Kingdom	35, rue du Faubourg-Saint-Honoré	8th arrondissement		
United States	2, avenue Gabriel	8th arrondissement		
Uruguay	33, rue Jean-Giraudoux	16th arrondissement		
Uzbekistan	22, rue d'Aguesseau	8th arrondissement		
Venezuela	11, rue Copernic	16th arrondissement		
Vietnam	61, rue de Miromesnil	8th arrondissement		
Yemen	25, rue Georges-Bizet	16th arrondissement		
Zambia	18, avenue de Tourville	7th arrondissement		
Zimbabwe	10, rue Jacques Bingen	17th arrondissement		

== Consulates-General and Embassy Consular Sections ==
Country	Address	Area	Image	Website
Algeria	1, Passage du Trône	11th arrondissement		
Angola	16, rue Henri-Rochefort	17th arrondissement		
Austria	17, avenue de Villars	7th arrondissement		
Brazil	65, Avenue Franklin D. Roosevelt	8th arrondissement		
Burkina Faso	112, rue de Vaugirard	6th arrondissement		
Colombia	12, rue de Berri	8th arrondissement		
Czech Republic	18, rue Bonaparte	6th arrondissement		
Dominican Republic	8 bis, avenue Percier	8th arrondissement		
Egypt	53, boulevard Bineau	Neuilly-sur-Seine		
Germany	28, rue Marbeau	16th arrondissement		
Greece	23, rue Galilée	16th arrondissement		
Haiti	35, avenue de Villiers	17th arrondissement		
Hungary	7, square de Vergennes	15th arrondissement		
India	20, rue Albéric-Magnard	16th arrondissement		
Iran	16, rue Fresnel	16th arrondissement		
Iraq	61, rue Pergolèse	16th arrondissement		
Italy	5, boulevard Émile-Augier	16th arrondissement		
Ivory Coast	18, rue Léonard de Vinci	16th arrondissement		
Lebanon	123, avenue de Malakoff	16th arrondissement		
Mali	53, rue Hoche	Bagnolet		
Mexico	4, rue Notre-Dame-des-Victoires	2nd arrondissement		
Morocco	12, Rue de la Saïda	15th arrondissement		
Peru	25, rue de l'Arcade	8th arrondissement		
Portugal	6, rue Georges-Berger	17th arrondissement		
Romania	3, rue de l'Exposition	7th arrondissement		
Saudi Arabia	29, rue des Graviers	Neuilly-sur-Seine		
Senegal	22, rue de l'Amiral-Hamelin	16th arrondissement		
Spain	165, Boulevard Malesherbes	17th arrondissement		
Tunisia	17-19, rue de Lübeck	16th arrondissement		
Turkey	44, rue de Sèvres	Boulogne-Billancourt		
Venezuela	8, impasse Kléber	16th arrondissement		

== Other missions or delegations ==
Country	Address	Area	Image	Website
Artsakh	10, rue Degas	16th arrondissement		
Catalonia	50, rue Saint Ferdinand	17th arrondissement		
North Korea	3, rue Asseline	14th arrondissement		
Quebec	66, rue Pergolèse	16th arrondissement		
Republic of China (Taiwan)	78, rue de l'Université	7th arrondissement		
Wallonia	274, boulevard Saint-Germain	7th arrondissement		

== Official Residences ==
Country	Address	Area	Image
Belgium	25, rue de Surène	8th arrondissement	
Brazil	5, rue de l'Amiral-d'Estaing	16th arrondissement	
Canada	135, rue du Faubourg-Saint-Honoré	8th arrondissement	
Colombia	29, rue de Constantine	7th arrondissement	
Egypt	2, place des États-Unis	16th arrondissement	
Germany	78, rue de Lille	7th arrondissement	
India	2, rue du Général-Lambert	7th arrondissement	
Iraq	9, rue d'Andigné	16th arrondissement	
Japan	31, rue du Faubourg-Saint-Honoré	8th arrondissement	
Libya	2, rue Charles Lamoureux	16th arrondissement	
Luxembourg	8, avenue Émile-Deschanel	7th arrondissement	
Madagascar	1, boulevard Suchet	16th arrondissement	
Malaysia	48, boulevard Suchet	16th arrondissement	
Mexico	20, avenue du Président-Wilson	16th arrondissement	
Nepal	7, rue Albéric-Magnard	16th arrondissement	
Netherlands	85, rue de Grenelle	7th arrondissement	
Norway	34, Rue François 1er	8th arrondissement	
Pakistan	5, rue du Général-Appert	16th arrondissement	
Peru	50, avenue Kléber	16th arrondissement	
Poland	57, rue Saint-Dominique	7th arrondissement	
Romania	123, rue Saint-Dominique	7th arrondissement	
Russia	79, rue de Grenelle	7th arrondissement	
Senegal	23, rue Vineuse	16th arrondissement	
Serbia	1, boulevard Delessert	16th arrondissement	
South Africa	5, rue Cimarosa	16th arrondissement	
Spain	15, avenue George V	8th arrondissement	
Switzerland	142, rue de Grenelle, Hôtel de Besenval	7th arrondissement	
Thailand	18, rue Albéric-Magnard	16th arrondissement	
Turkey	16, avenue de Lamballe	16th arrondissement	
United Kingdom	39, rue du Faubourg Saint-Honoré	8th arrondissement	
United States	41, rue du Faubourg-Saint-Honoré	8th arrondissement	

== See also ==
- Foreign relations of France
- List of diplomatic missions in France
