= Eva Nguyen Binh =

Vietnamese-French diplomat

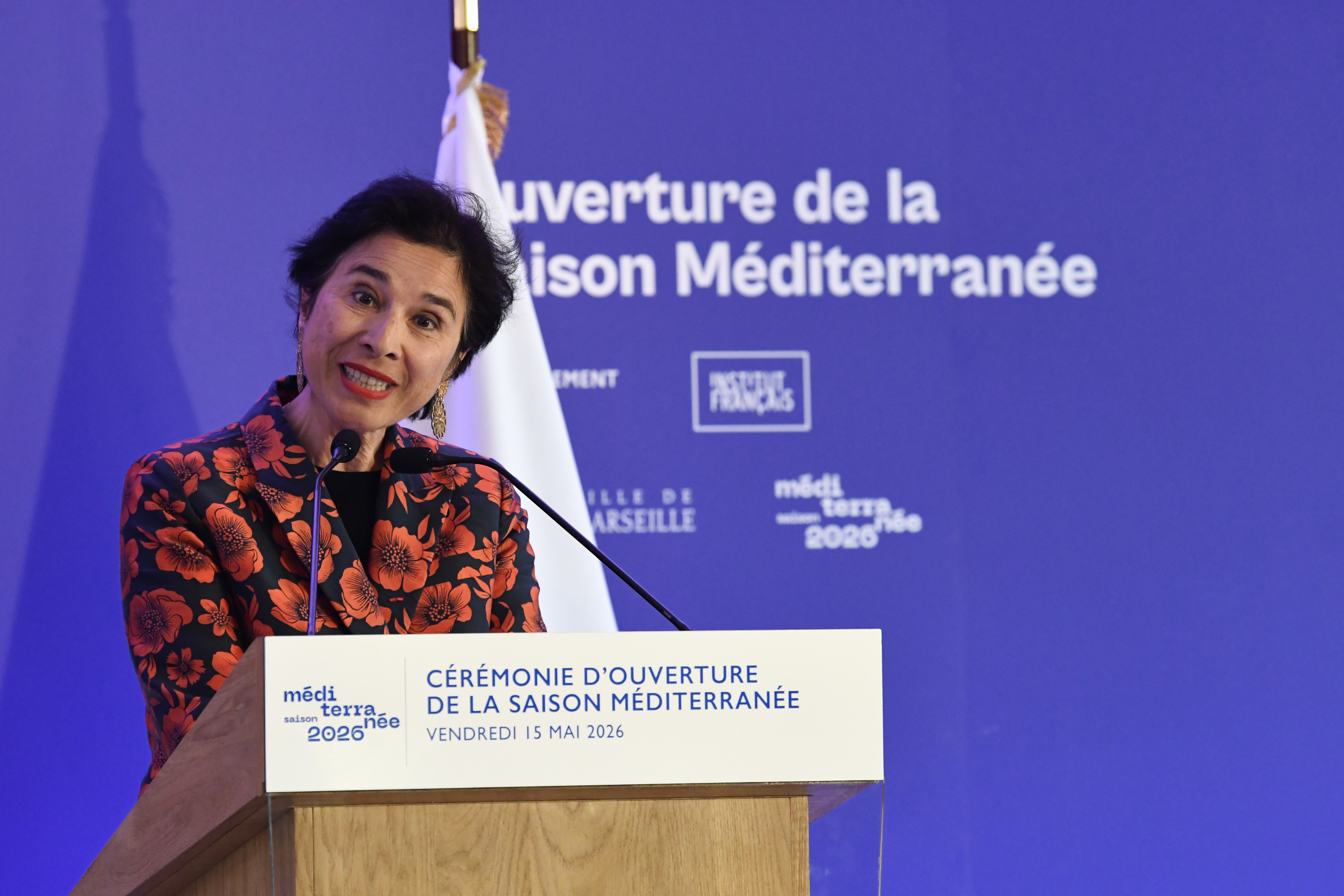
- Eva in 2026.

President of the Institut Français
- Incumbent
- Assumed office since 1 July 2021
- Preceded by: Pierre Buhler

French ambassador to Cambodia
- In office 2017–2021

Personal details
- Born: September 4, 1970 (age 55) Poitiers, Nouvelle-Aquitaine, France
- Education: Institut d'études politiques de Strasbourg; Walsh School of Foreign Service
- Occupation: Diplomat writer
- Awards: Legion of Honour (2016); Ordre des Arts et des Lettres (2023)

Eva Nguyễn Bình (born 4 September 1970 in Poitiers) is a Vietnamese-French female diplomat and writer. Since 2021, she has served as the President of the Institut Français, and was the French ambassador to Cambodia between 2017 and 2021.

== Biography ==
Eva Nguyen Bình was born on 4 September in 1970 in Poitiers, Nouvelle-Aquitaine, France. Her father was Vietnamese, who moved to France in 1962, while her mother was French. She was initially named as Nguyễn Bình Thanh Hương by her father, however due to difficulties in pronouncing the name, her mother changed it to Eva Nguyễn Bình instead.

She studied at the Strasbourg Institute of Political Studies and the Walsh School of Foreign Service. She began her career in 1994, the America Directorate of the Ministry of Foreign Affairs, and later worked at various French embassies in Portugal and Asia. Between 2013 and 2017, she served as the director of the Institut Français in Vietnam. Her husband is Jean-Noel Poirier, the French ambassador to Vietnam between 2012 and 2016.

Between 2017 and 2021, she was appointed by the French government to be French ambassador to Cambodia. In 2021 and 2024, she was appointed as President of the Institut Français.
