= IFI =

IFI may refer to:

- Ifield railway station, West Sussex, England (code: IFI)
- Philippine Independent Church (Spanish: Iglesia Filipina Independiente)
- Illinois Family Institute, United States, a conservative Christian organisation
- Industrial Fasteners Institute, a trade and standards organization and publisher based in Independence, Ohio
- Inland Fisheries Ireland, a state agency in Ireland
- InnerChange Freedom Initiative, a Christian prisoner program
- International Federation of Interior Architects/Designers, a global interior architecture/design umbrella organization
- International financial institutions, a financial institution that has been established (or chartered) by more than one country, and hence is subject to international law
- International Fund for Ireland, inter-governmental agency promoting reconciliation in Ireland
- Institut de la Francophonie pour l'Informatique (Computer Science Institute for the Francophonie), a graduate school in computer science in Vietnam
- Institut Français d'Indonésie, a French cultural institution in Indonesia
- Institut de Formation Internationale, a business school in Rouen, France
- Irish Film Institute, a cinema and national body based in Dublin, Ireland
- Islamic Foundation of Ireland, a religious organization in Dublin, Ireland
