= France–Indonesia relations =

- France: Indonesia

Diplomatic mission
- Embassy of Indonesia, Paris: Embassy of France, Jakarta

France and Indonesia established diplomatic relations on 4 January 1950. The indirect relationship between France and Indonesia commenced during the early 19th century colonial Dutch East Indies, while France became the colonial power of French Indochina including Cambodia and Laos alongside Cochinchina (present day Vietnam). Since 2011, France and Indonesia have formed a strategic partnership.

France has an embassy in Jakarta while Indonesia has an embassy in Paris. The relations between the two nations are important as both are democratic republics and each holds significant geopolitical influences in its respective region. France is a key member of the European Union, while Indonesia is a core constituent of ASEAN. The diplomatic relations between France and Indonesia are a key element for developing relations between Indonesia and the European Union and between France and the Association of Southeast Asian Nations. Both nations are the member of G-20 major economies.

According to a 2013 BBC World Service Poll, 56% of Indonesians view France's influence positively, with only 14% expressing a negative view. This is one of the most favourable perceptions of France in the Asia-Pacific, only lagging behind more positive views by South Korea and Australia.

== History ==
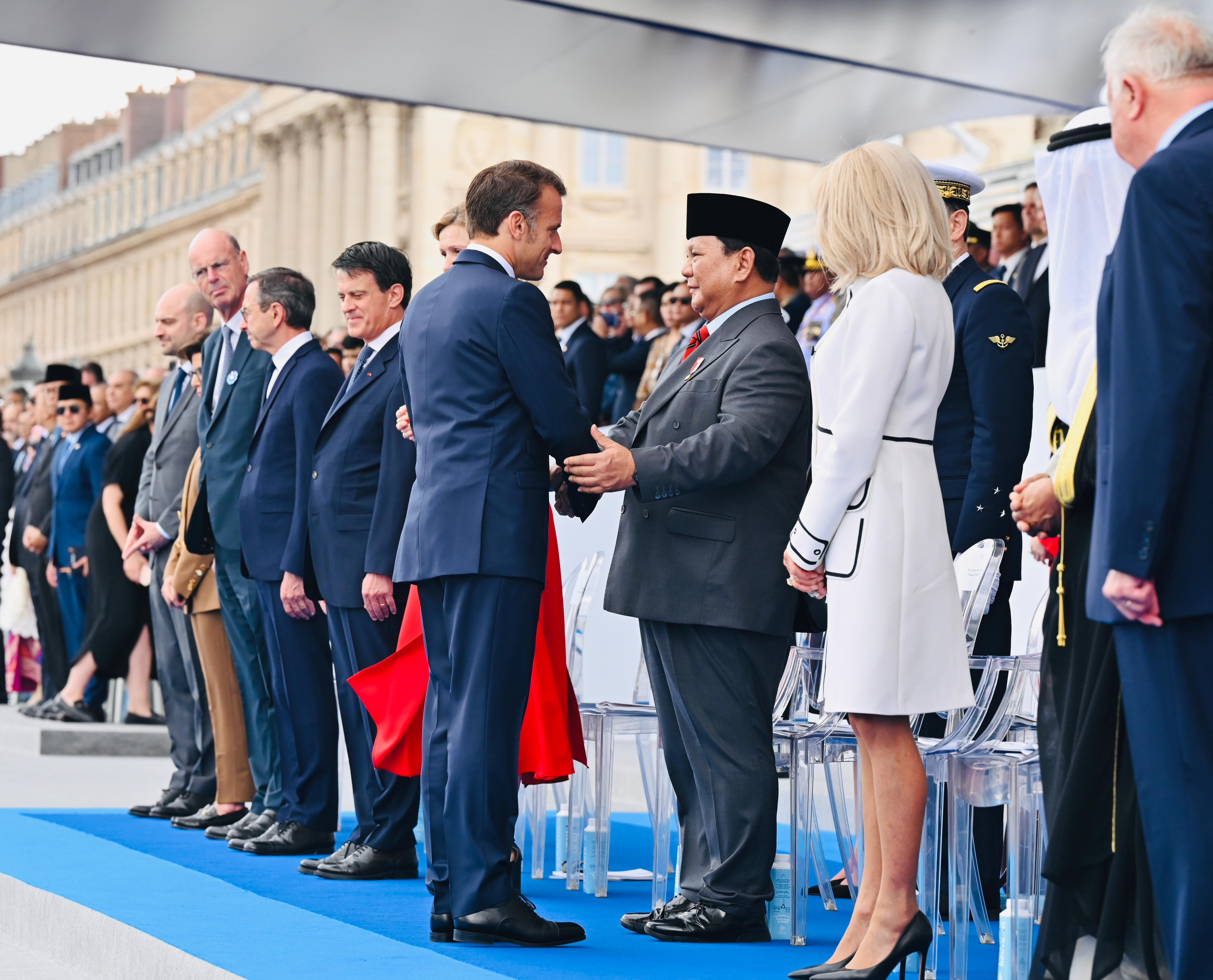
French President Emmanuel Macron and Indonesian President Prabowo Subianto during the Bastille Day in Paris, 14 July 2025

=== Before Indonesian Independence ===
The indirect relationship between France and Indonesia commenced during the early 19th century colonial Dutch East Indies. During the Napoleonic Wars, the Netherlands fell to the French Empire, which also seized territorial possessions belonging to the Netherlands in the East Indies. For a short period between 1806 and 1811, Indonesia was subject to French administration. During the reign of Governor General Herman Willem Daendels (1808–1811), France exercised its political influence in the East Indies through the Dutch Republic. Daendels was Dutch Francophile, and during his reign in Java he built a grand palace known as Het White Huis (The White House) or Het Groote Huis (The Big House), today the Indonesian Ministry of Finance building, that demonstrate French Empire style. He also renamed the Buffelsveld (buffalo field) to Champs de Mars (today Merdeka square). The battle for Java was fought between British and French-Dutch Republics during Anglo-Dutch Java War in 1811. Following the Siege of Saigon in 1859 as part of Cochinchina Campaign, with French Cochinchina (present day Vietnam) as its establishment by France, when it was signed as the Treaty of Saigon. Cambodia became the French protectorate in 1863, Laos was added to the Union after the Franco-Siamese crisis forced Siam to cede territories east of the Mekong River to France.

The French Revolution and its Republic government also inspired the later Indonesian nationalist movement in the early 20th century. The political concept of the Republic of Indonesia was partly influenced by the Republic of France model. Indonesia also adopted the Napoleonic Continental legal system through Dutch intermediary. Indonesian law is often described as a member of the 'civil law' or 'Continental' group of legal systems found in European countries such as France and the Netherlands.

=== After Indonesian Independence ===
France recognized Indonesia's sovereignty from Dutch rule in 1950 and then established diplomatic relations. Indonesia's first President Sukarno visited France three times in 1963, 1964 and 1965. Then continued by Indonesia's second President Soeharto in 1972, an intense meeting indicated that France was an important country for Indonesia. The first French President to visit Indonesia was François Mitterrand in 1986, indicating that there was close cooperation between the two countries. In 1992, Soeharto visited France again for strategic economic cooperation. After the fall of the new order regime, President Abdurrahman Wahid visited France in 2000 and President Yudhoyono in 2009. In 2017, after 30 years, the French President visited Indonesia again François Hollande, indicating the warming of relations between the two countries in the twenty-first century.

During the G20 2022 meeting in Bali, French President Emmanuel Macron and Indonesian President Joko Widodo alongside Indonesian Ministry of Defence Prabowo realized the major military and investment procurement for Indonesia and France. France also has a friendship group with Indonesia, as with other countries. The friendship group consists of deputies from France's National Assembly.

== Economic relations ==
The Indonesian French Chamber of Commerce and Industry (IFCCI) was established in 1986 to develop and foster economic, commercial, and financial relations between France and Indonesia.

== Culture ==
The objective of French cultural cooperation action is to support Indonesia's development as a new emerging country. Accordingly, it gives priority to research (rural development, aquaculture, volcanology, geophysics, and archaeology), university exchanges, primarily in the fields of technology and biological sciences, vocational training, support for strengthening the rule of law and democratic governance. Which includes legislative technical assistance, fight against terrorism and corruption, decentralization, human rights training. The implementation of quality cultural actions, such as through the "French Springtime" (Le Printemps Français) cultural festival and audiovisual policy.

France also has established Institut Français in Indonesian cities of Jakarta, Bandung, Yogyakarta and Surabaya, a French cultural center with the mission to promote French culture in Indonesia through cultural performances and exhibitions, film and mediatheque.

=== Language ===
The culture-linguistic relations between Indonesian and French were conducted through Dutch, as evident in Indonesian loanwords from French that mainly political or military terms, such as kudeta (from coup d'état), legiun (from légion) and letnan (from lieutenant). Institut Français Indonesia also offering French course for Indonesian students.

=== Archaeology ===
Based on the expertise of the Advisory Board on Archaeological Research Abroad, the Foreign Affairs Ministry (DGCID) subsidizes the following archaeological missions in Indonesia:

- Borneo: Diachronic study of uses and Rock Art in the caves and rock shelters of East Kalimantan
- Java 01: A prehistoric site from the upper Pleistocene period
- Java 02: The first populations on the Indonesian archipelago
- Tapanuli

=== Music ===
In art and musics, France and Indonesia has mutual cultural ambassador, Anggun an Indonesian French-naturalised singer-songwriter, is popular in both France and Indonesia.

== Current issue ==
=== Capital punishment ===
In 2015, a French citizen Serge Atlaoui, is facing deathrow in Indonesian prison. During the raid on a factory producing ecstasy in Tangerang, in 2005, the Indonesian police busted Atlaoui there. He was subsequently convicted in 2007 for the possession of 138 kilograms of crystal methamphetamine, 290 kg of ketamine and 316 drums of precursor substances. Atlaoui has repeatedly denied the charges; saying that he was installing industrial machinery in what he thought was an acrylics factory.

On 22 April 2015, French President Francois Hollande warned Indonesia that the execution would damage the relations between the two nations. Atlaoui was spared from the execution on 29 April 2015, and currently, his sentence is being postponed. France is strongly opposed to the death penalty in any place and in any context, not only when the life of a French national is at stake. France has been abolitionist since 1981. Diplomatic relations are described as 'normal' despite the Atlaoui case.

In 2025, after spending nearly 20 years behind bars, Atlaoui was repatriated to France in early February. Atlaoui also has been suffering from cancer and received weekly treatment at a hospital in Jakarta.

=== Defense Ties ===
After France and Australia heated relations with AUKUS debacle, France moves closer with Indonesia for the security of Indo-Pacific Region and also sells 42 Dassault Rafale fighters alongside Scorpène submarines.

=== State visit of President Emmanuel Macron to Indonesia (2025) ===
From 27 to 29 May 2025, French President Emmanuel Macron paid a state visit to Indonesia at the invitation of President Prabowo Subianto, as part of his tour of Southeast Asia. During the bilateral meeting held at the Merdeka Palace in Jakarta on 28 May 2025, both leaders reaffirmed their commitment to strengthening the France–Indonesia strategic partnership established in 2011.

The visit saw the signing of the Joint Declaration on the Development of the Indonesia–France Strategic Partnership until 2050 (“Joint Vision 2050”) and several memoranda of understanding covering culture, science and technology, renewable energy, defence, and security.

In the field of defence and security, both nations welcomed the entry into force of the Defence Cooperation Agreement (DCA) and agreed to enhance collaboration on joint production and defence technology transfer.

In science and innovation, the visit marked the signing of a Letter of Intent between Indonesia’s National Research and Innovation Agency (BRIN) and French institutions including the Centre national de la recherche scientifique (CNRS) and the Institut de recherche pour le développement (IRD) to establish an annual school for young researchers and a joint marine research centre.

A partnership agreement strengthened cultural cooperation, covering creative industries, film, music, textiles, and the development of a new Franco–Indonesian cultural centre.

The state visit coincided with the 75th anniversary of diplomatic relations between France and Indonesia.

== Resident diplomatic missions ==
- France has an embassy in Jakarta.
- Indonesia has an embassy in Paris and consulates-general in Marseille and Nouméa, New Caledonia.
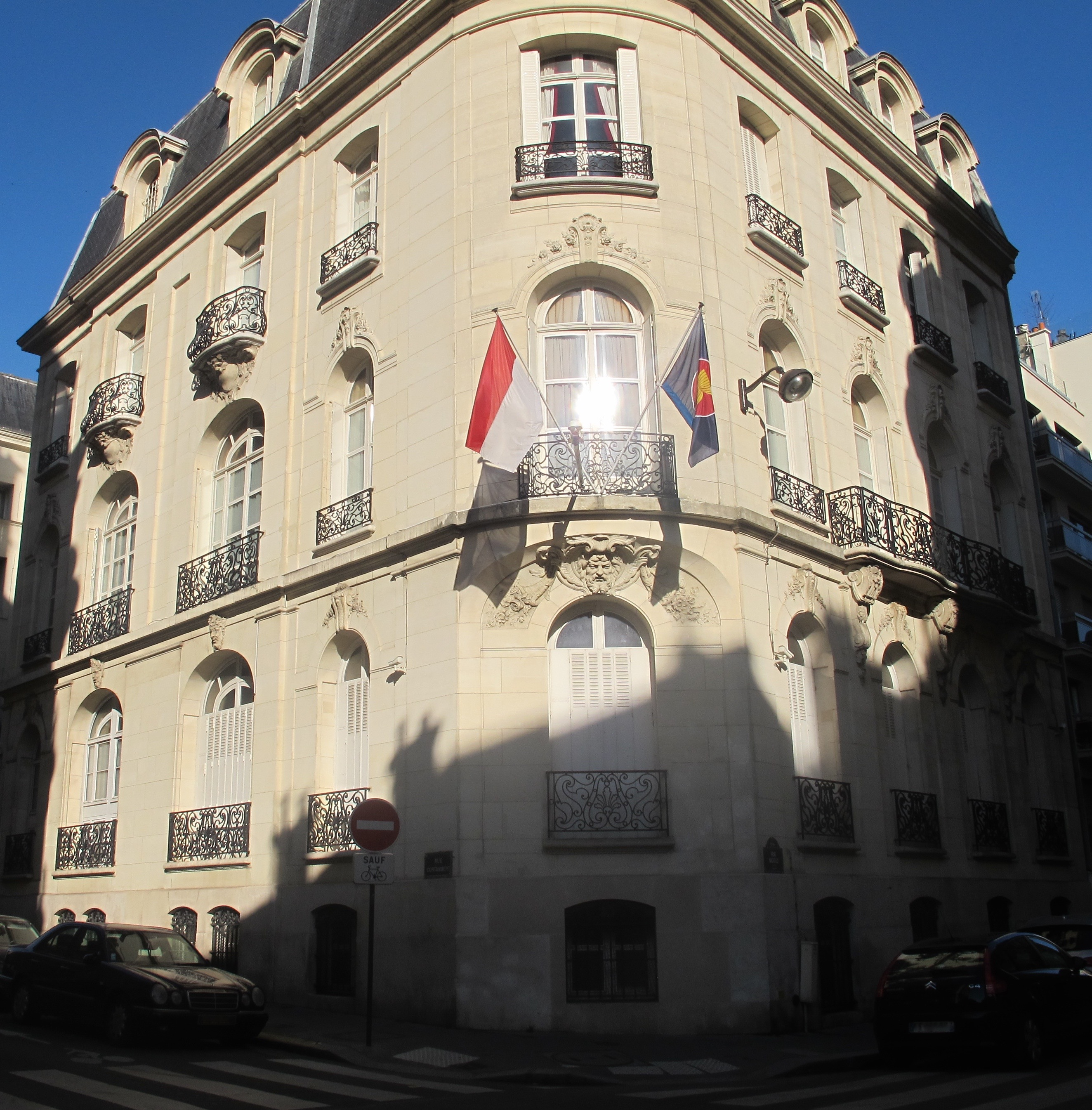
Embassy of Indonesia in Paris

== See also ==
- Foreign relations of France
- Foreign relations of Indonesia
- Javanese New Caledonians
