= Catherine Briat =

French diplomat and writer

Catherine Briat is a French diplomat and writer. After working for large media groups such as RTL and Radio France, she joined the diplomatic service. She has served in Ottawa and in Berlin, where she was the director of the Institut français. Her novel Le divan rouge was published by Editions Heloise d'Ormesson.
