= Embassy of Palestine, Paris =

Diplomatic mission of Palestine in France

Embassy of Palestine in France
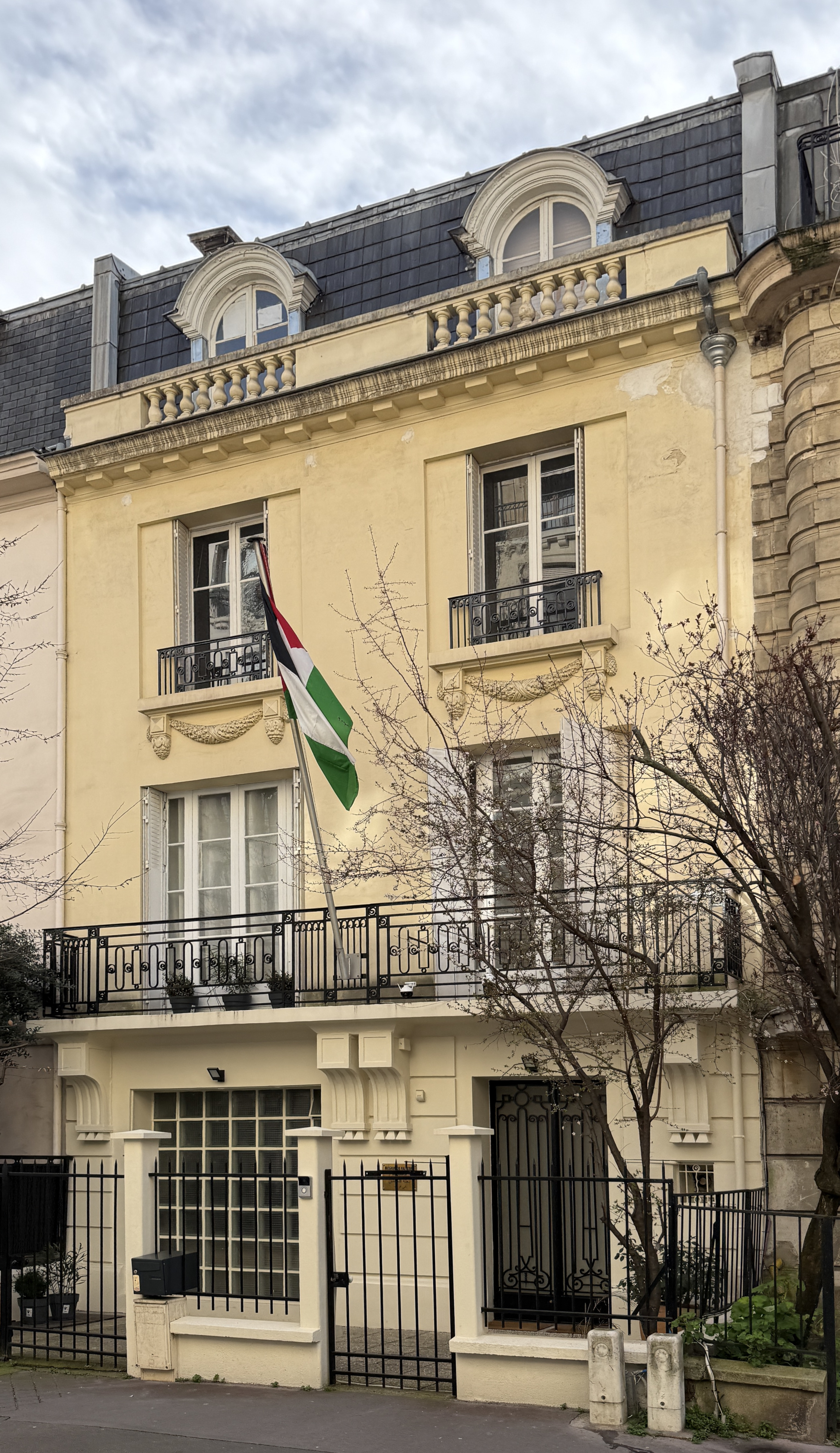
- The chancery building in February 2026
- Location: Paris, France
- Address: 14 Rue du Commandant-Léandri, 75015 Paris
- Coordinates: 48.838493°N 2.292538°E
- Ambassador: Hala Abou-Hassira

The Embassy of Palestine in France (French: Ambassade de Palestine en France) is the diplomatic mission of the State of Palestine in France. It was known as the Mission of Palestine in France until March 2026, when it obtained the rank of an embassy. The embassy is located at 14 Rue du Commandant-Léandri in the 15th arrondissement of Paris. Its ambassador, since 2021, is Hala Abou-Hassira.

== History ==
The Palestine Liberation Organization (PLO) maintained an unofficial presence in France before receiving authorization to open a formal office. From around 1970, the French authorities tolerated an unofficial PLO representation at the Paris office of the Arab League. Mahmoud Hamshari, the PLO's first representative in France, was assassinated in Paris in December 1972 in an attack attributed to Israel's Mossad.

In October 1975, the French government authorised the PLO to open an information and liaison office in Paris. According to Éric Aeschimann and Christophe Boltanski, remarks by Jacques Chirac reported in Yedioth Ahronoth on 15 August 1986 stated that Chirac, then Prime Minister of France, and foreign minister Jean Sauvagnargues had not been aware of the office's opening, and that the authorisation had been given by President Valéry Giscard d'Estaing.

In January 1989, President François Mitterrand announced that the PLO office in Paris would be upgraded to a "General Delegation of Palestine". Because France did not then recognise Palestine as a state, the delegation was not granted diplomatic status or the privileges attached to it, including immunity.

In July 2010, French foreign minister Bernard Kouchner upgraded the General Delegation of Palestine to the "Mission of Palestine" and granted its head the title of "Ambassador, head of the Palestinian Mission". The upgrade enabled the Palestinian head of mission, Hael al-Fahoum, to present credentials to the President of France.

France recognised the State of Palestine on 22 September 2025, when President Emmanuel Macron made the declaration at the United Nations General Assembly.

On 25 March 2026, Hala Abou-Hassira presented her credentials to President Emmanuel Macron as ambassador extraordinary and plenipotentiary of the State of Palestine. The presentation of credentials marked the elevation of the Palestinian representation in France from mission to embassy.

== Representatives ==
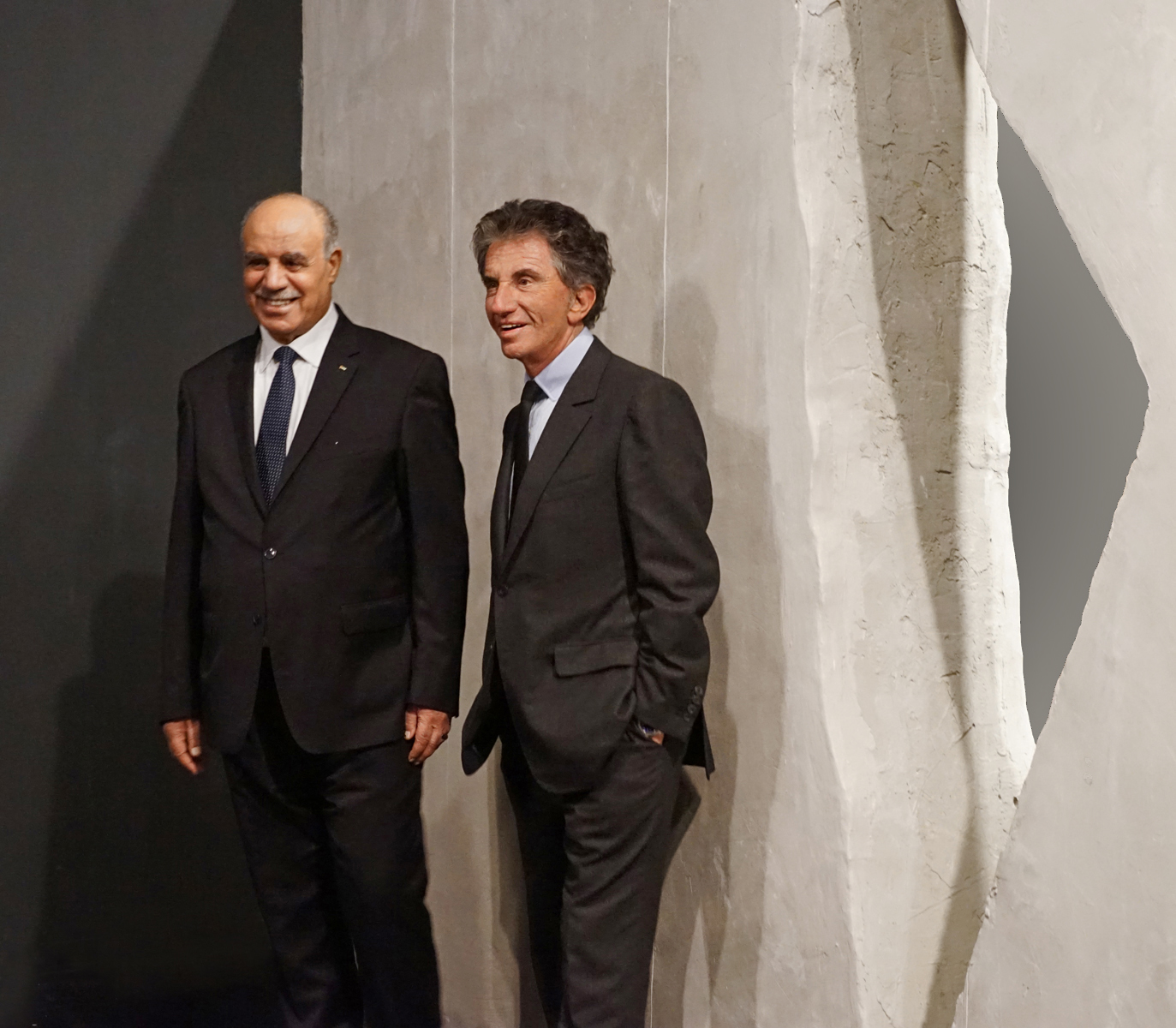
Salman El-Herfi (left), ambassador of Palestine in France, and Jack Lang, president of the Institut du Monde Arabe in Paris, inaugurate the exhibition Palestine, la création dans tous ses états in 2016.

Term	Presented credentials	Representative
PLO representatives before formal diplomatic status
before 1972		Mahmoud Hamshari
1973–1978		Ezzedine Kalak
General Delegation of Palestine
1978–1993		Ibrahim Souss
1993–2006		Leila Shahid
2006–2010		Hind Khoury
Mission of Palestine
2010–2016	9 June 2010	Hael al-Fahoum
2016–2021	15 February 2016	Salman El-Herfi
2021–2026	2 November 2021	Hala Abou-Hassira
Embassy of Palestine
2026–present	25 March 2026	Hala Abou-Hassira

== See also ==
- Foreign relations of the State of Palestine
- List of diplomatic missions of Palestine
- List of diplomatic missions in France
- Consulate General of France, Jerusalem
- France–Palestine relations
- International recognition of the State of Palestine
