= Institut français de Florence =

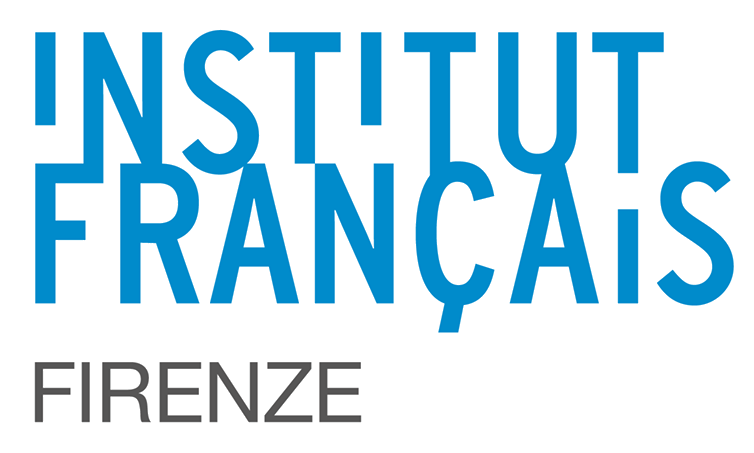
- Formation: November 9, 1907; 118 years ago
- Founder: Julien Luchaire
- Founded at: Florence
- Type: Cultural institution, EPIC
- Purpose: culture, education
- Coordinates: 43.77237°N 11.24529°E
- Services: French cultural and language education
- Official language: (in French)
- Owner: French Foreign Ministry
- Headmistress: Isabelle Mallez
- Key people: Romain Rolland
- Parent organization: Institut français (French institute)
- Website: institutfrancais-firenze.com

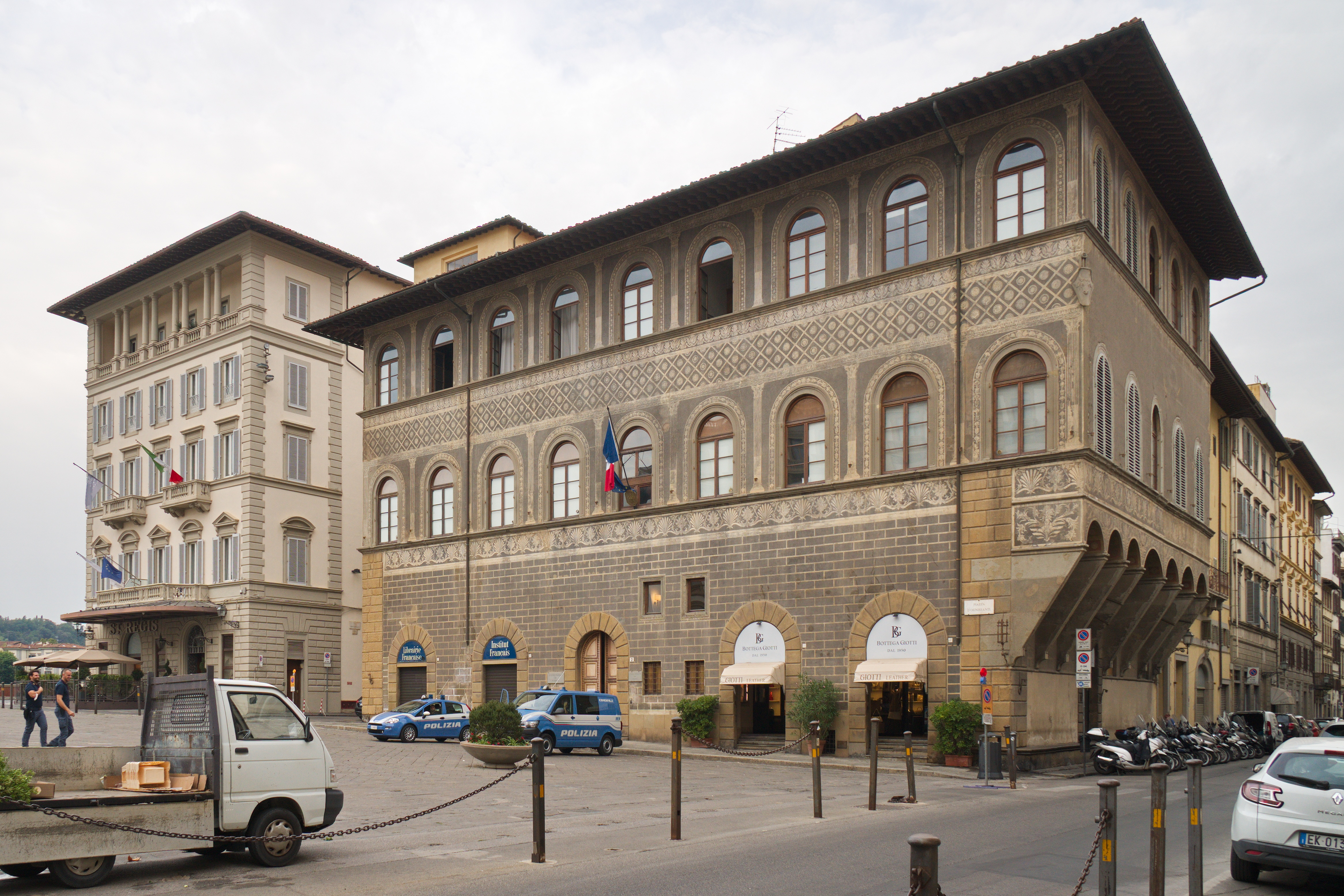
The Institut français de Florence, Palazzo Lenzi from 1470 at Piazza Ognissanti, attr. to Brunelleschi (sgrafitti by Andrea Feltrini)

The Institut français de Florence or French Institute in Florence is an Institut français in Florence, Italy. It is a French public institution attached to the French Foreign Ministry. The promotion of French culture and language overseas is its main mission. Founded in 1907 by Julien Luchaire, it is the oldest French cultural institute in the world.

== See also ==
- Alliance Française
- Institut français
