= Culturesfrance =

Former French international public agency for culture

Culturesfrance was a project of the French Ministry of Foreign Affairs and Ministry of Culture and Communication charged with promoting French culture around the world. Culturesfrance was created in May 2006 by the merger of the Association française d'action artistique (French Association for Artistic Action, AFAA) and the Association pour la diffusion de la pensée française (Association for the Dissemination of French Thought, ADPF). The ADPF was a project of the Ministry of Foreign Affairs to promote books written in French. The AFAA was founded by the French government in 1922 to promote international cultural exchange and provide development assistance in the arts, including the visual arts, applied arts, architecture, and cultural heritage. In addition, Culturesfrance promoted French cinema.

Culturesfrance was a nonprofit organization as defined by the Association loi 1901. It is chaired by Jacques Blot and directed by Olivier Poivre d'Arvor.

In 2010 the French Parliament made the association a non-governmental organization and transferred its duties from the French Ministry of Foreign and European Affairs to a public corporation (établissement public à caractère industriel et commercial, or EPIC) called the Institut français (French Institute). A proposal to create a similar public corporation, the Institut Victor Hugo (Victor Hugo Institute), was rejected by the French Senate in 2009.
