= Embassy of Indonesia, Paris =

Embassy of Indonesia, Paris Kedutaan Besar Republik Indonesia di Paris Ambassade d'Indonésie à Paris

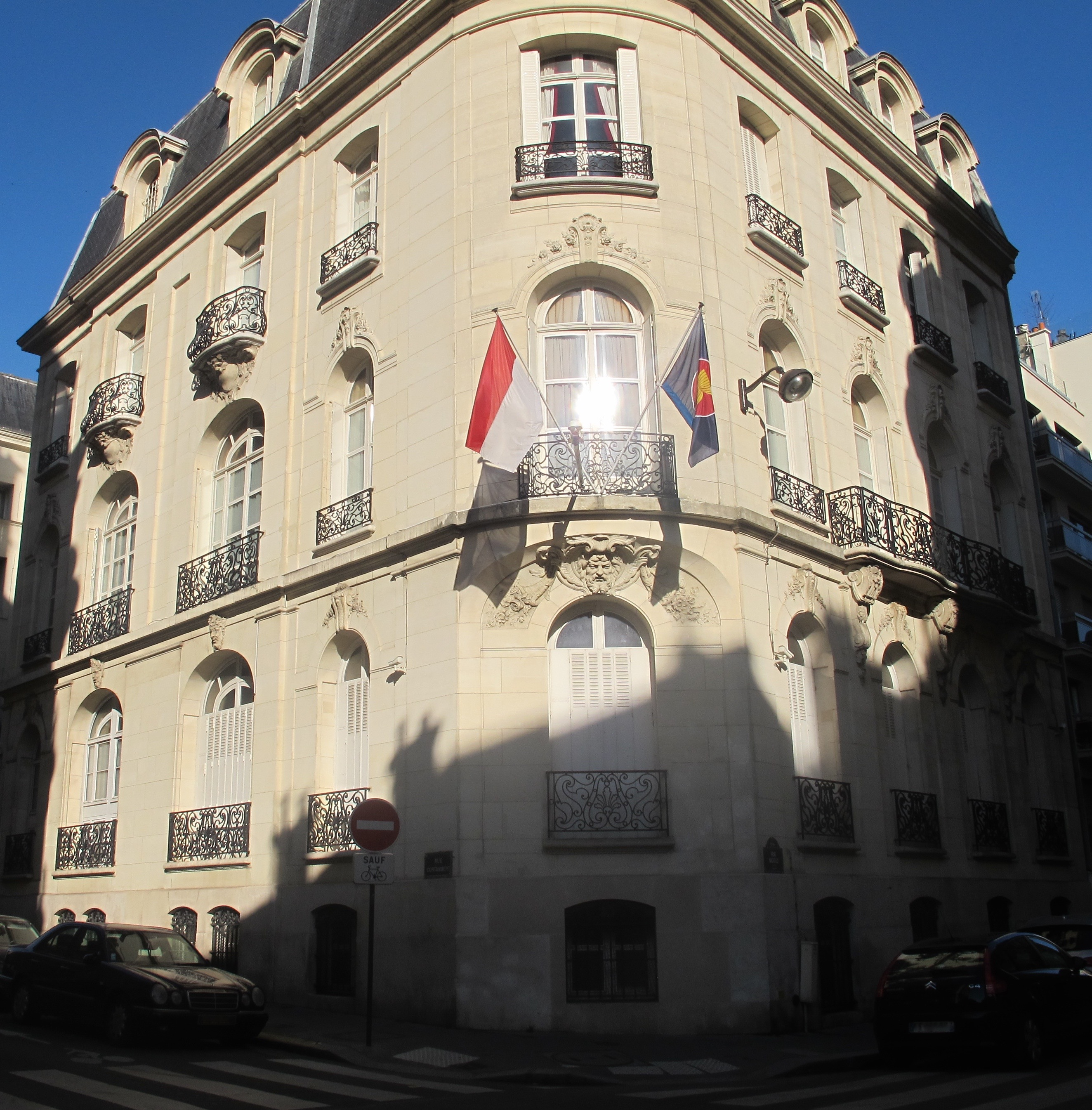
- Location: Paris, France
- Address: 47-49, rue Cortambert; 75016 Paris, France
- Coordinates: 48.860250°N 2.278417°E
- Ambassador: Mohamad Oemar
- Jurisdiction: France; Andorra; Monaco
- Website: www.kemlu.go.id/paris/en/

The Embassy of Indonesia in Paris (Indonesian: Kedutaan Besar Republik Indonesia di Paris; French: Ambassade d'Indonésie à Paris), is the diplomatic mission of Indonesia in France. The embassy is accredited to France, Monaco, and Andorra. It is located at 47-49 rue Cortambert, in the 16th arrondissement of Paris, the French capital city. The current ambassador is Mohamad Oemar since 2021.

== History ==
On 26 May 1962, the embassy was attacked with plastic explosives placed on a windowsill on the ground floor of the embassy.

On 8 October 2004, a bomb exploded in front of the embassy, slightly injuring ten people. The Armed French Islamic Front claimed the attack.

In the morning of 21 March 2012, a letter bomb exploded in front of the embassy without injuring anyone, but caused serious damage to cars and windows within a fifty metre radius.

== Consulates ==
As well as its embassy in Paris, Indonesia has two consulates in Marseille, Bouches-du-Rhône and in Nouméa, New Caledonia.

== See also ==
- France–Indonesia relations
- Indonesia–Monaco relations
- List of diplomatic missions in Indonesia
- List of diplomatic missions in France
