= Embassy of Argentina, Paris =

Argentinian Embassy in Paris

Coordinates: 48.8682°N 2.2901°E

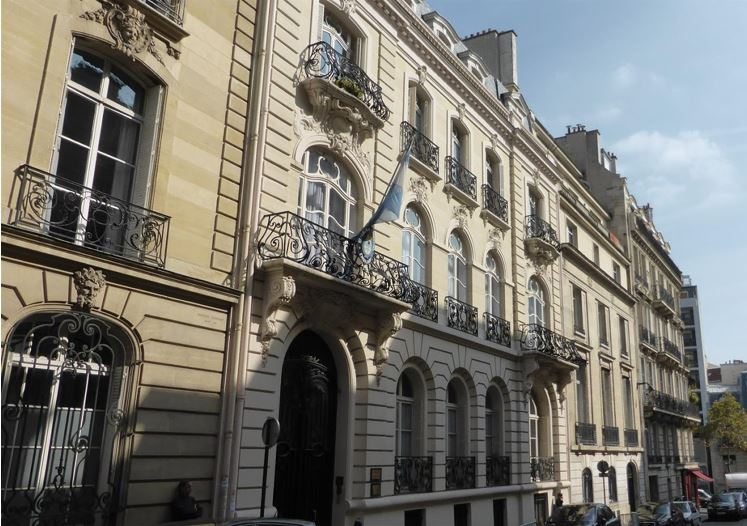
The Argentine embassy in Paris.

The Argentine Embassy in France is the diplomatic representation of the Argentine Republic to the French Republic. It is located in Paris, and its ambassador has been, since 2024, HE Mr. Ian Sielecki.

== Location ==
The embassy is located at 6 rue Cimarosa in the 16th arrondissement of Paris.

The construction of the mansion is the work of the architect Jacques Hermant. The building is in the Belle Époque style. It was commissioned by entrepreneur, businessman and art lover Léon Orsodi in January 1895, who lived there until 1923. On January 14, 1926, the building is purchased in the name of the Argentine government on a message from Argentine President Marcelo Torcuato de Alvear by Frederico Alvarez de Toledo, Argentine Ambassador to Paris, but without the authorization of the executive power. The next government refuses the purchase authorization and the house becomes the ambassador's residence in a personal capacity. The headquarters of the embassy was finally installed there on February 10, 1964 .

In 1900, the embassy sat at 9 rue Alfred de Vigny, in the 8th arrondissement of Paris.

== Ambassadors of Argentina in France ==
Luis Ureta Sáenz Peña
Aldo Ferrer
María del Carmen Squeff
Jorge Faurie
Mario Raùl Veron Guerra
Leonardo Daniel Costantino

== See also ==
- List of diplomatic missions in France
- List of diplomatic missions of Argentina
- Argentina–France relations
