= Institut Français =

French cultural international public agency

Institut français
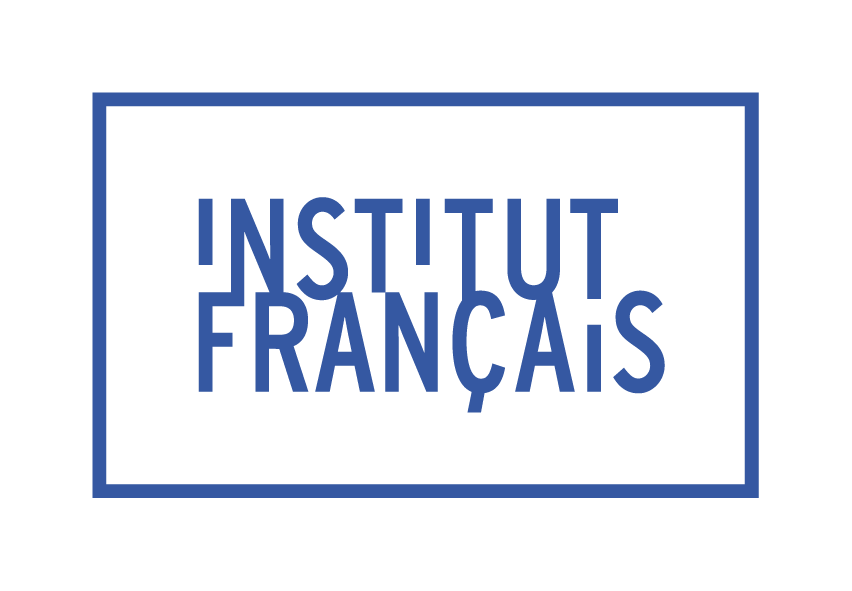
- Founded: 1907; 119 years ago
- Type: Cultural institution, EPIC
- Region served: Worldwide
- Product: French cultural and language education
- Key people: Eva Nguyễn Bình (2021-present)
- Website: http://www.institutfrancais.com

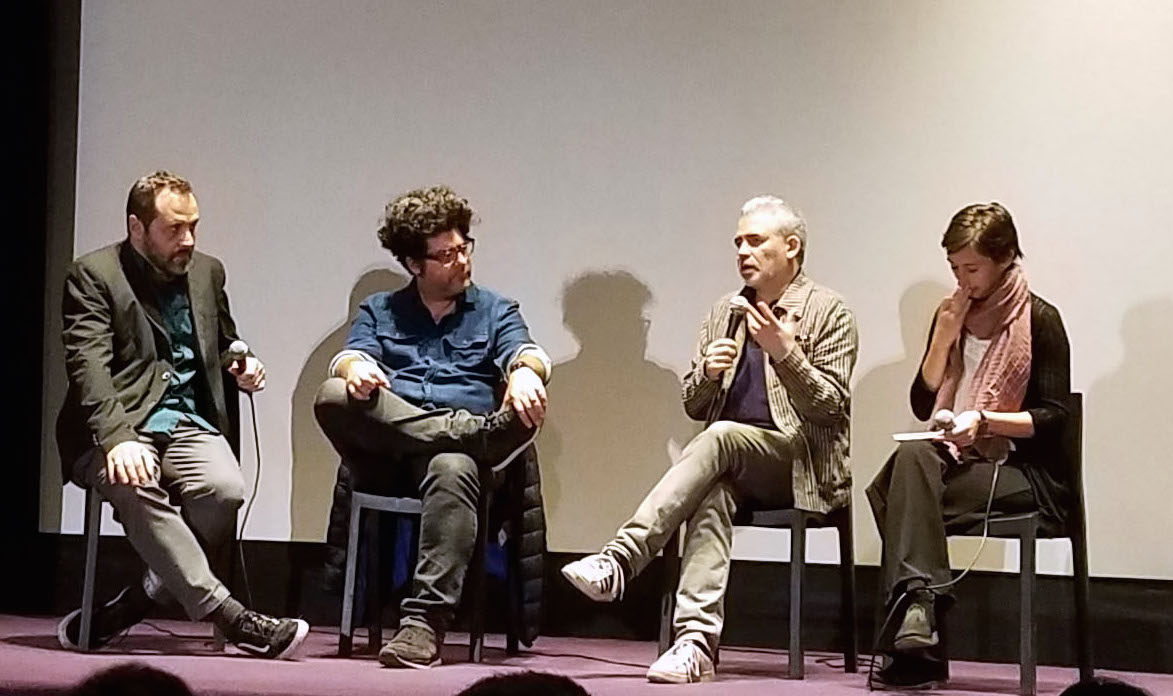
French filmmaker Stéphane Brizé (second from the right) in Buenos Aires in 2019, at an event supported by Institut français d'Argentine

The Institut Français (French pronunciation: [ɛ̃stity fʁɑ̃sɛ]; French capitalization, Institut français; "French institute") is a French public industrial and commercial organization (EPIC). Started in 1907 by the Ministry of Foreign Affairs for promoting French, francophone as well as local cultures around the world, in 2011 it replaced the CulturesFrance project as the umbrella for all French cultural outreach projects, with an expanded scope of work and increased resources (Decree No. 2010-1695 of 30 December 2010, in response to the law relating to the external scope of the State adopted on 12 July 2010).

Chaired by interim by its general director Erol Ok, who is assisted by Clément Bodeur-Cremieux, Secretary General, the French Institute works closely with the French cultural network abroad consisting of more than 150 branches and nearly 1000 branches of the Alliance française around the world. The process of incorporating the cultural networks of a dozen diplomatic missions has been conducted from January 2011 to 2014 as an experiment: Cambodia, Chile, Denmark, United Arab Emirates (UAE), Georgia, Ghana, India, Kuwait, UK, Senegal, Serbia, Singapore and Syria (suspended due to the political situation in Syria).

The government has entrusted the Institut Français with promoting French culture abroad through artistic exchanges: performing arts, visual arts, architecture, the worldwide diffusion of French books, film, technology and ideas. Accordingly, the institute has developed a new scientific program for the dissemination of culture.

The Institut Français welcomes foreign cultural missions through the organization of "seasons" or festivals and cooperation with the countries of the south, including ensuring the management of the funds of "Fonds Sud Cinema" in partnership with the National Center of Cinematography and the moving image.

It also provides training for newly formed missions and professionalization of staff of the international French cultural network.

== History of French cultural institutes and centers ==
The first French institute, the Institut français de Florence, was established in 1907 in Florence by Julien Luchaire, with the help of the Faculty of Arts of Grenoble, followed by others would play an important role in the creation of deep cultural ties between France and other country.

Historically the French institutions established in the first half of the 20th century were committed to academic institutions, while the French cultural centres, usually created later in the second half of the 20th century or the beginning of the 21st century, were created by the French government. This difference does not exist anymore and cultural centers are now adopting the name of Institut Français.

Some institutions have a bi-national status, governed by a bilateral agreement between the governments, particularly in Guinea (Conakry), Guinea Bissau ( Bissau), Mozambique ( Maputo), Namibia ( Windhoek) and Niger (Jean Rouch Franco-Nigerien Cultural Centre of Niamey).

The 143 French institutions and French cultural centers are institutions located outside France under the Ministry of Foreign Affairs and charged with promoting intellectual and cultural audiovisual cooperation between professionals, to present the French, Francophone as well as local traditional and contemporary art for all audiences (to begin with, with the young audience), to promote French higher education to foreign students and teachers and offer a complete range of courses and international examinations for the French language.

They usually have, in the embassies of France which they depend on, a financially (but not legally) autonomous status. This also gives its director the status of authorising and being accountable for the budget devoted to the establishment (which is a grant from the Ministry of Foreign Affairs and from its own resources) and a reserve fund not limited to the year, which enables the creation of multi-year programs.

They are funded fully or partially by their own revenues raised by teaching French as official language or as a foreign language (depending on the countries) and sponsorship (for those with a genuine ambition in terms of cultural engineering).

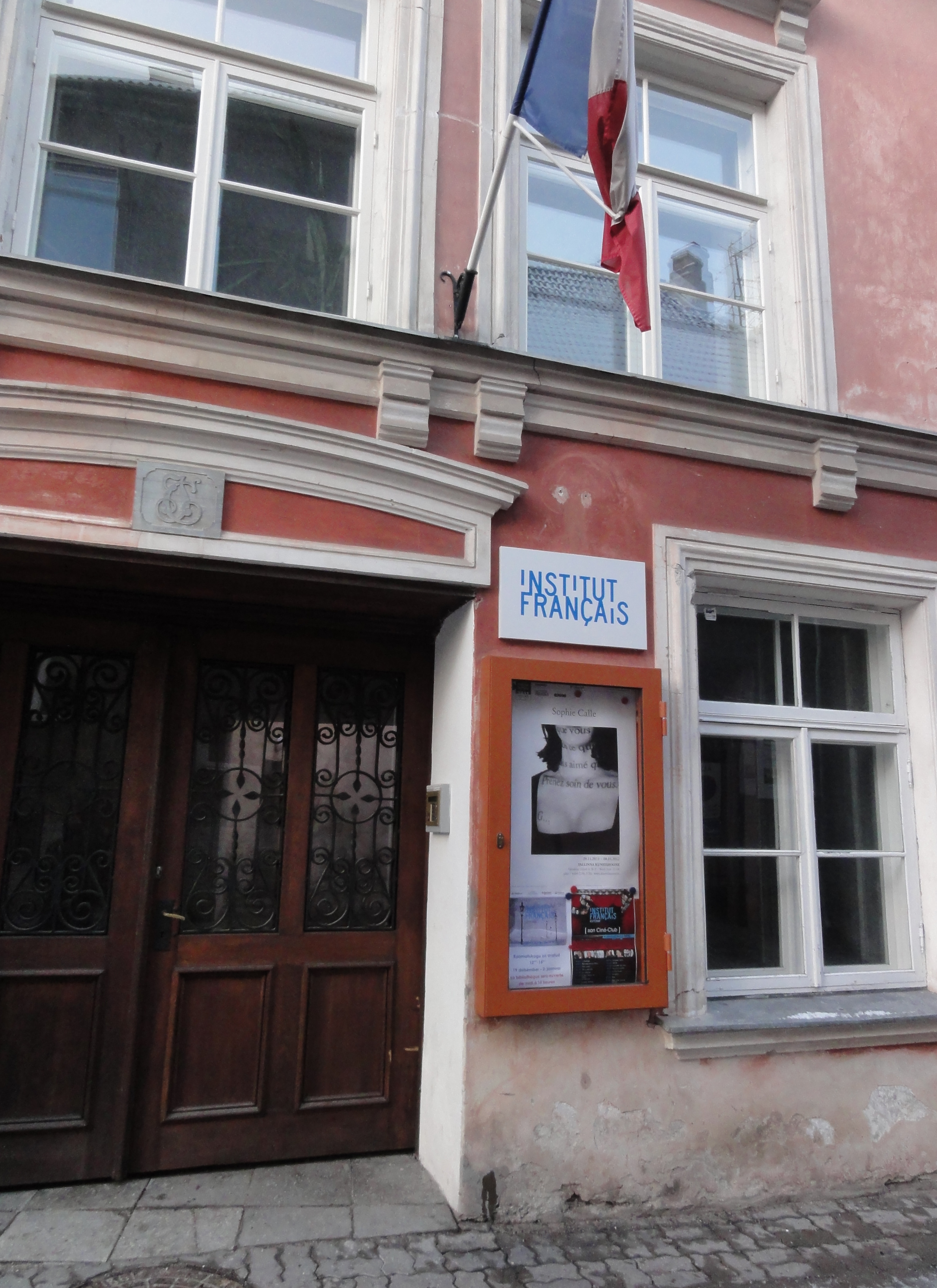
Institut Français - Estonia

Moreover, the French research institutes abroad (IFRE) depend jointly on the Ministry of Foreign Affairs and the CNRS.

Today, French institutions and French cultural centers (RTCs) are essential levers for the development of cooperation between network professionals culture and education as well as for the promotion of cultural and linguistic diversity.

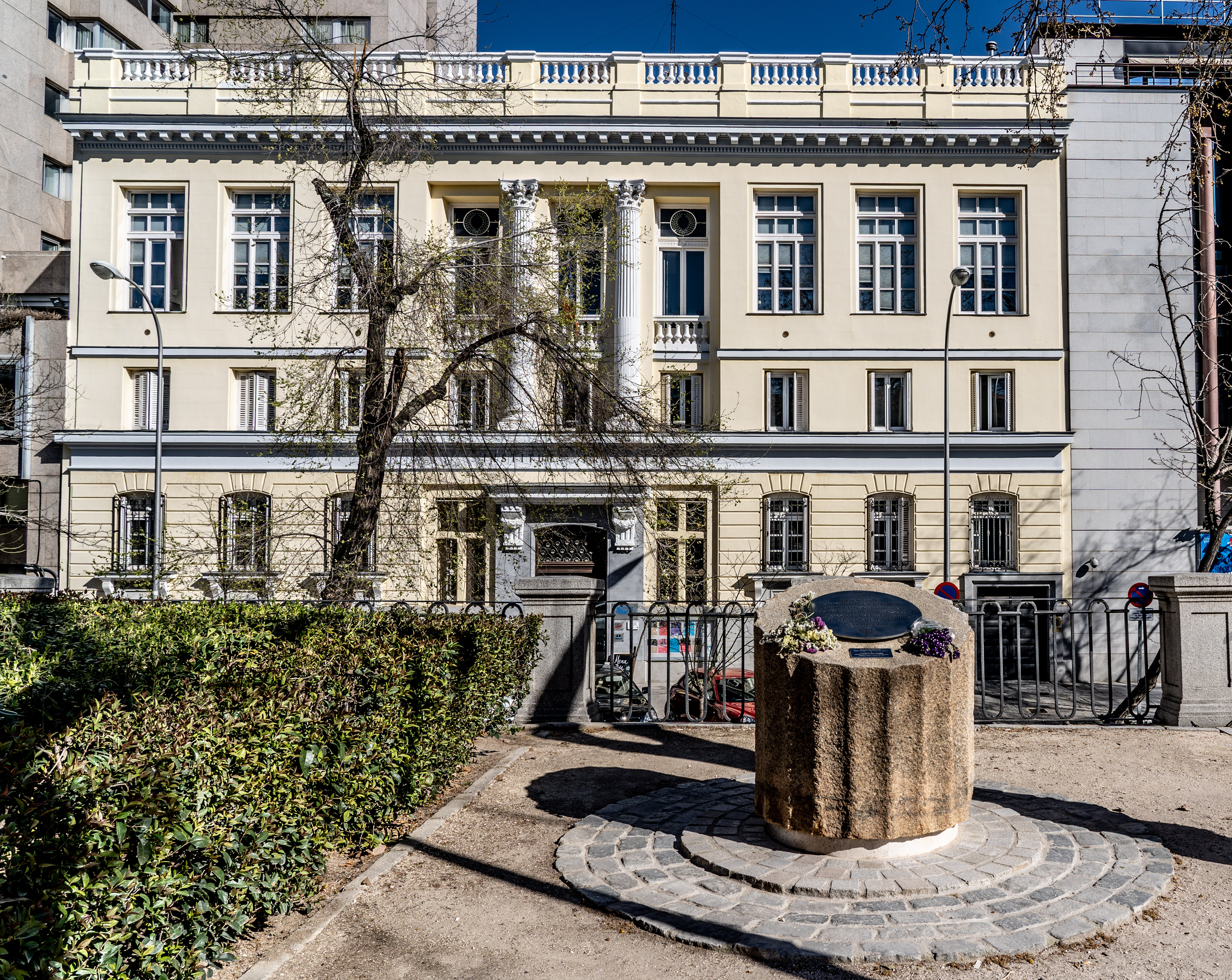
Institut français - Madrid

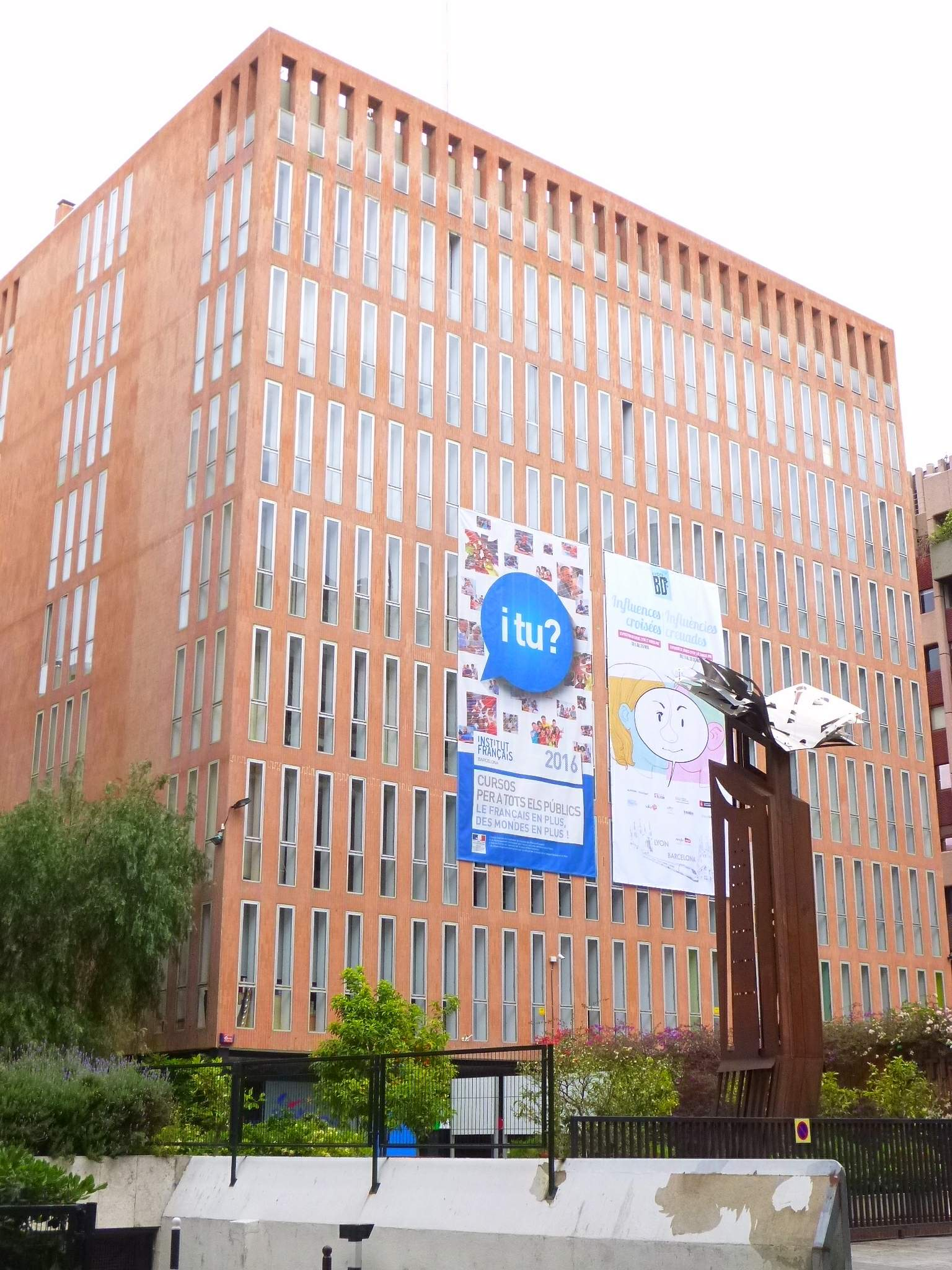
Institut français - Barcelona

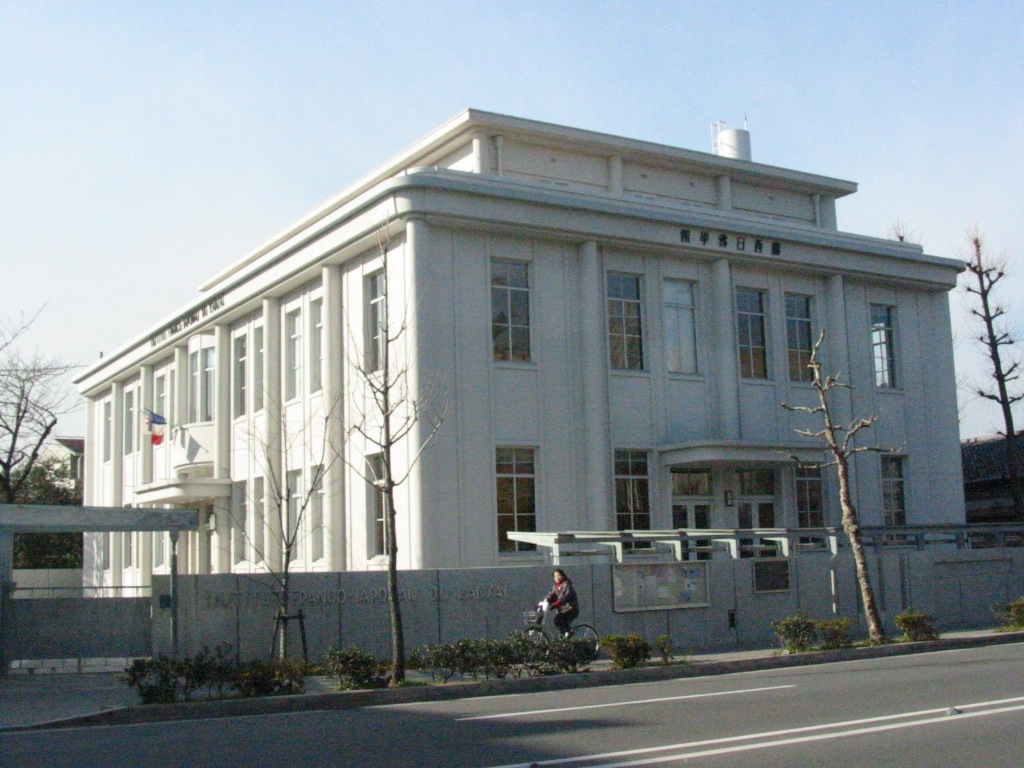
Institut français du Japon – Kansai

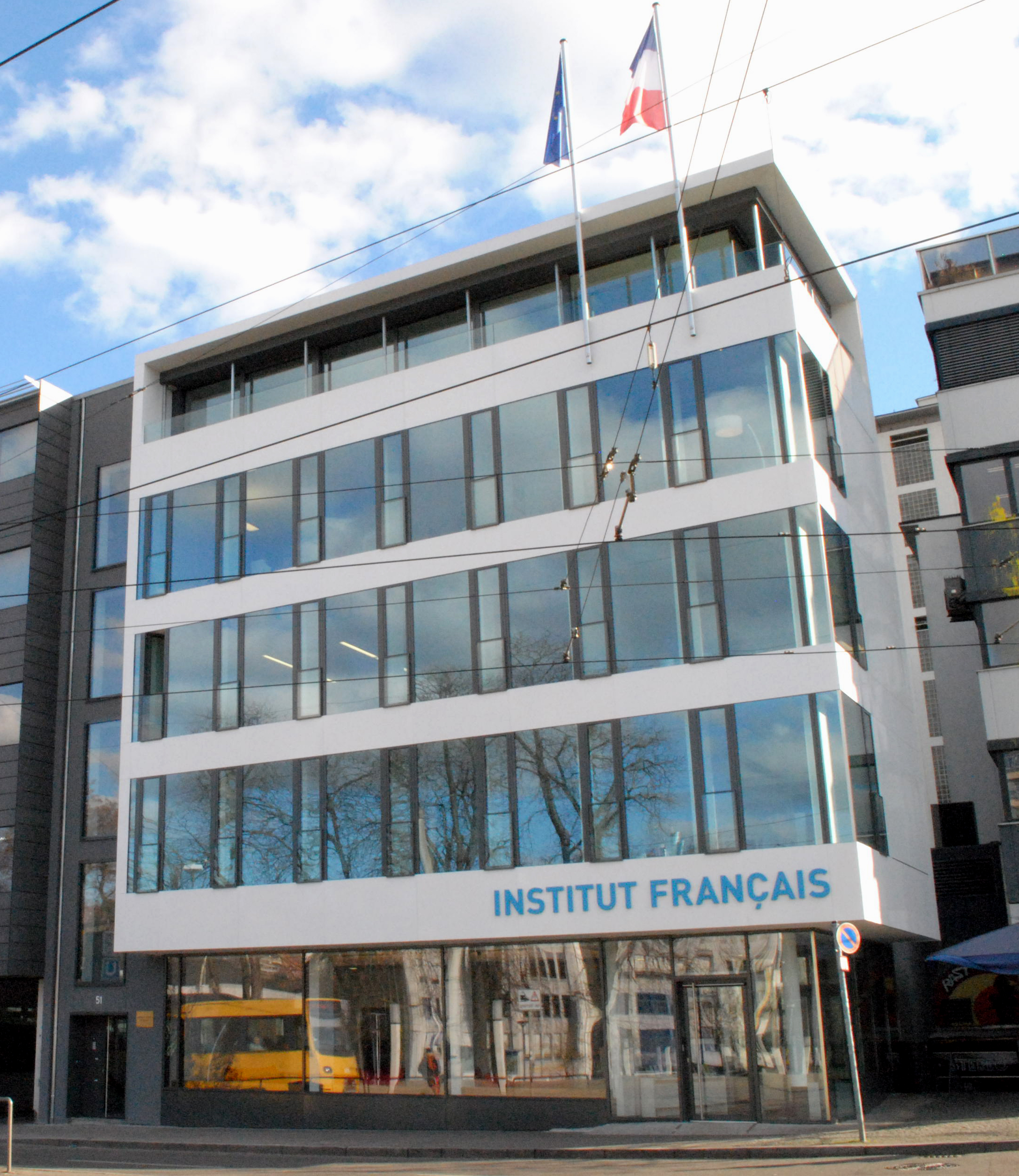
Institut français - Stuttgart

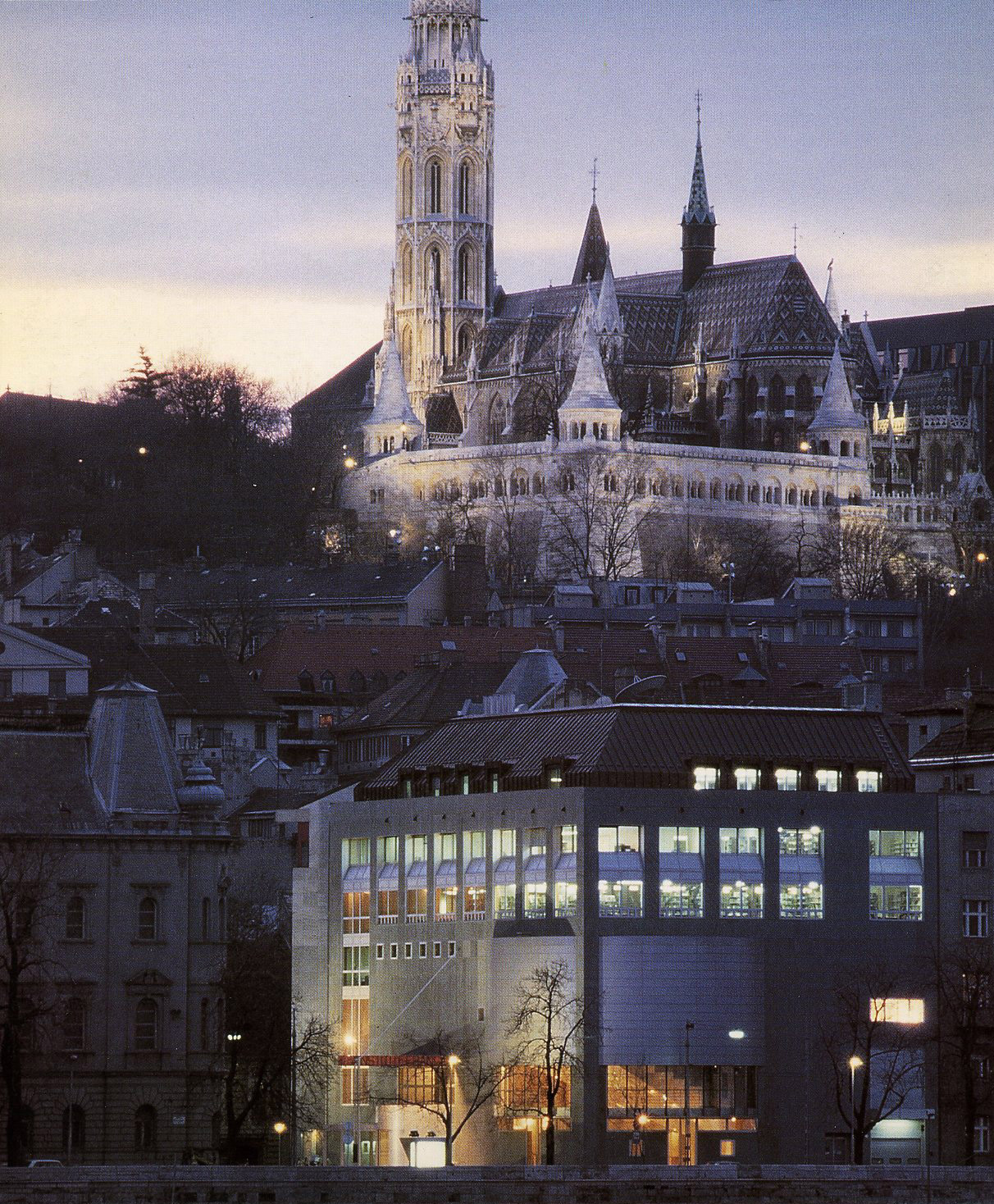
Institut français de Hongrie - Budapest

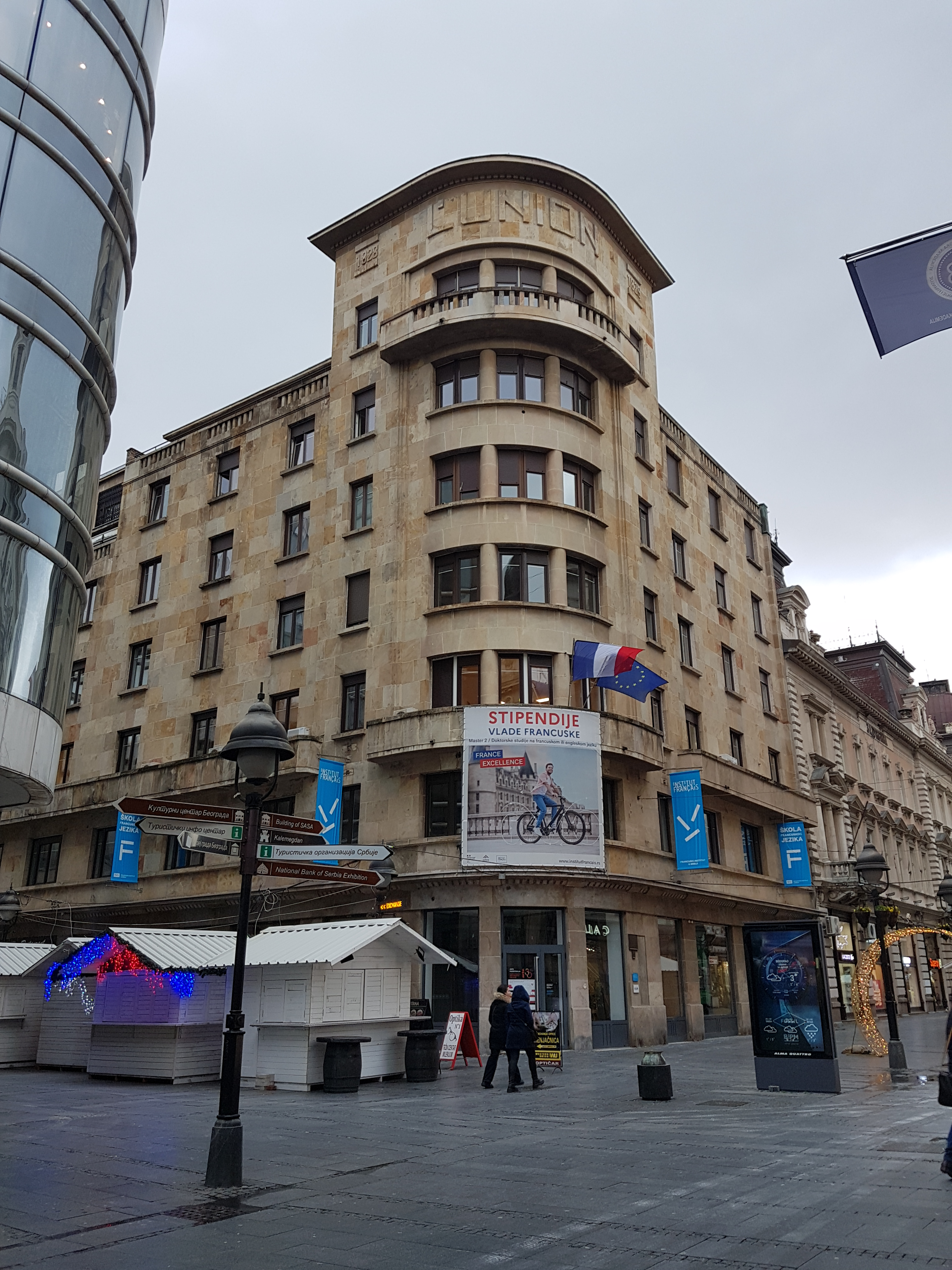
Institut Français de Serbie - Belgrade

== Some international French institutes ==
=== Cultural institutes ===
==== In Europe ====
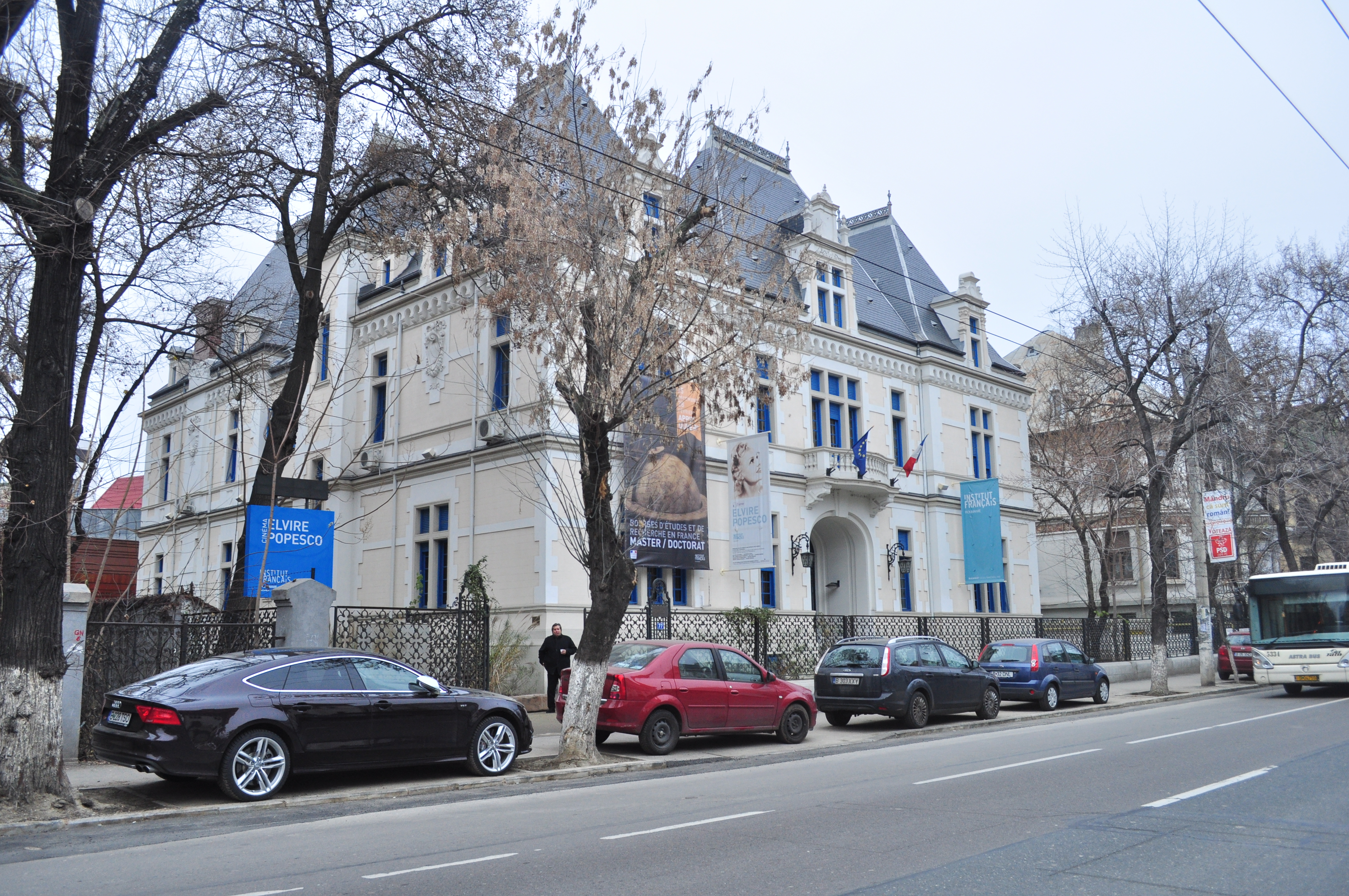
Institut français in Bucharest, Romania

- Institut français d'Allemagne
- Institut français d’Ankara
- Institut français d'Athènes
- Institut français de Barcelone
- Institut français de Belgrade
- Institut français de Bilbao
- Institut français de Bratislava
- Institut français de Bucarest
- Institut français de Budapest
- Institut français du Danemark
- Institut français d'Écosse (Edinburgh)
- Institut français de Finlande
- Institut français de Florence
- Institut français d’Istanbul
- Institut français d'Italie
- Institut français de Lettonie
- Institut français du Royaume-Uni (London)
- Institut français de Madrid
- Institut français de Naples
- Institut français de Milan
- Institut français de Norvège
- Institut français de Novi Sad
- Institut français de Nis
- Institut français de Palerme
- Institut français de Pologne: Kraków and Warsaw
- Institut français du Portugal
- Institut français de Prague
- Institut français - Centre Saint-Louis (Rome)
- Institut français de Roumanie (Bucharest)
- Institut français de Saint-Pétersbourg
- Institut français de Saragosse
- Institut français de Sarajevo
- Institut français de Sofia
- Institut français de Slovénie
- Institut français de Stockholm
- Institut français de Stuttgart
- Institut français d'Estonie (Tallinn)
- Institut français des Pays-Bas
- Institut français de Grèce (Thessaloniki)
- Institut français de Thessalonique
- Institut français d'Ukraine (Kyiv)
- Institut français de Valence
- Institut français de Vienne
- Institut français de Zagreb

==== Outside Europe ====
Africa

- Instituts français en Algérie (Algeria) at Algiers, Oran, Constantine, Annaba and Tlemcen
- Instituts français au Maroc (Morocco) at Agadir, Casablanca, Fez, Marrakesh, Meknes, Oujda, Rabat, Salé and Tangier
- Institut français en Mauritanie (Mauritania) at Nouakchott
- Institut français à Maurice (Mauritius) at Beau Bassin-Rose Hill
- Institut français Léopold Sédar Senghor (Senegal) at Dakar
- Institut français au Bénin at Cotonou
- Institut français en Côte d'Ivoire at Abidjan
- Institut français au Gabon at Libreville
- Institut français au Ghana at Accra
- Institut français au Soudan at Khartoum
- Institut français au Togo at Lomé
- Institut français en Libye at Tripoli and Benghazi
- Institut français en Tunisie at Tunis
- Institut français en Égypte at Alexandria, Cairo, and Heliopolis
- Institut français au Cap-Vert
- Institut français en République démocratique du Congo at Kinshasa
- Institut français au Congo at Brazzaville
- Institut français en Guinée équatoriale
- Institut français du Nigeria

America

- Institut franco-chilien - Instituto chileno-francés at Providencia, Chile
- Institut français d'Amérique latine at Mexico
- Institut français au Canada
- Institut français aux États-Unis / French Institute Alliance Francaise
- Institut français en Haïti at Port-au-Prince

Asia

- Institut français de Singapour at Singapore
- Institut français au Cambodge (Cambodia) at Battambang, Phnom Penh and Siem Reap
- Institut français en Chine (China) at Beijing
- Institut français en Birmanie (Myanmar) at Rangoon
- Institut français en Inde (India) at New Delhi
  - antenna at Pondichéry
- Institut Français d'Indonésie (Indonesia) at Jakarta, Bandung, Surabaya, and Jogjakarta
- Institut français de Tel-Aviv (Israel) at Tel Aviv
- Institut français de Jérusalem - Romain Gary, Jérusalem
- Institut franco-japonais (Japan)
  - Institut franco-japonais de Tokyo et Yokohama
  - Institut franco-japonais du Kansai at Kyoto
  - Institut franco-japonais du Kyushu at Fukuoka
- Mission culturelle française au Liban (Lebanon) at Beirut, Tripoli, Sidon, Deir al-Qamar, Zahlé, Jounieh, Nabatieh, Tyre and Baalbek
- Institut français en Irak at Baghdad and Erbil
- Institut français aux Émirats arabes unis at Abu Dhabi
- Institut français en Corée du Sud at Seoul
- Institut français au Vietnam
  - at L'Espace, Hoàn Kiếm, Hanoi
  - at Hà Đông, Hanoi
  - at Huế
  - at Da Nang
  - at Ho Chi Minh City

=== Research institutes IFRE ===
- Centre de recherche français à Jérusalem (CRFJ) – Israel
- Centre français de recherche en sciences sociales (CEFRES) – Prague
- Institut de recherche sur le Maghreb contemporain (IRMC) – Tunis
- Institut de recherche sur l'Asie du Sud-Est contemporaine (IRASEC) – Bangkok
- Institut français d'archéologie orientale (IFAO) – Le Caire (rattaché au MESR et non au MAEE)
- Institut français de Pondichéry (IFP) – Pondichéry
- Institut français de recherche en Afrique IFRA-Nigeria et IFRA-Nairobi
- Institut Français de Recherche en Iran (IFRI) – Tehran
- Institut français du Proche-Orient (IFPO) – Damascus – Beirut – Amman
- Institut français d'Afrique du Sud (IFAS) – Johannesburg
- Institut français d'études anatoliennes Georges Dumézil (IFEA) – Istanbul
- Institut français d’études andines (IFEA) – Lima
- Institut français d’études sur l'Asie centrale (IFEAC) – Tashkent
- Maison Française d'Oxford (MFO) – United Kingdom

== Incidents ==
In November 2023, the Institut francais in Gaza was hit by an Israeli air strike amid the Gaza war, but no injuries were reported among staff at the site.
