= Cambodia–France relations =

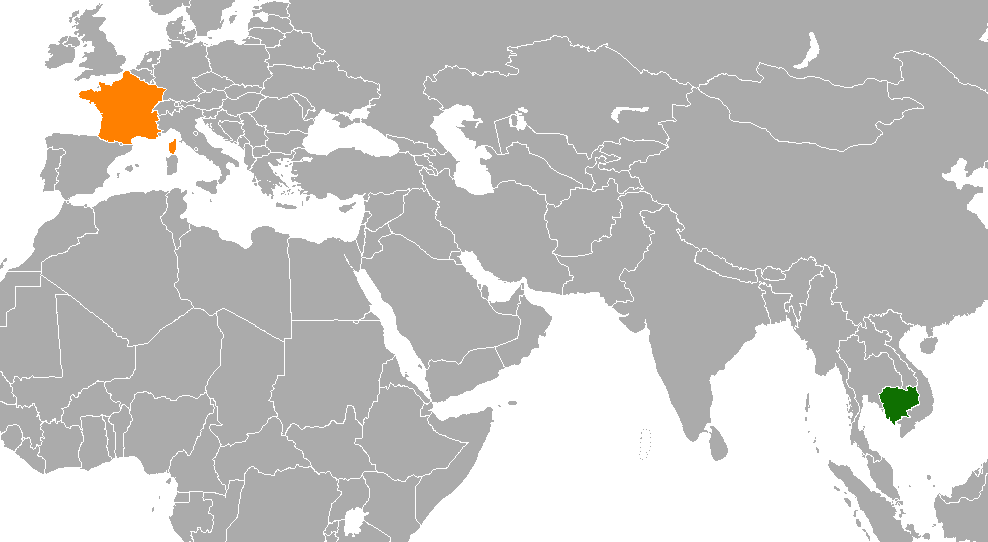
- Cambodia: France

Cambodia–France relations (Khmer: ទំនាក់ទំនងកម្ពុជា–បារាំង, French: Relations Cambodge–France) are the bilateral relations between the Kingdom of Cambodia and the French Republic. Cambodia was a protectorate of France from 11 August 1863 to 9 November 1953. King Norodom approached the French in 1861 in an attempt to stop neighbors Thailand and Vietnam from gaining control of Cambodia's land.

== History ==
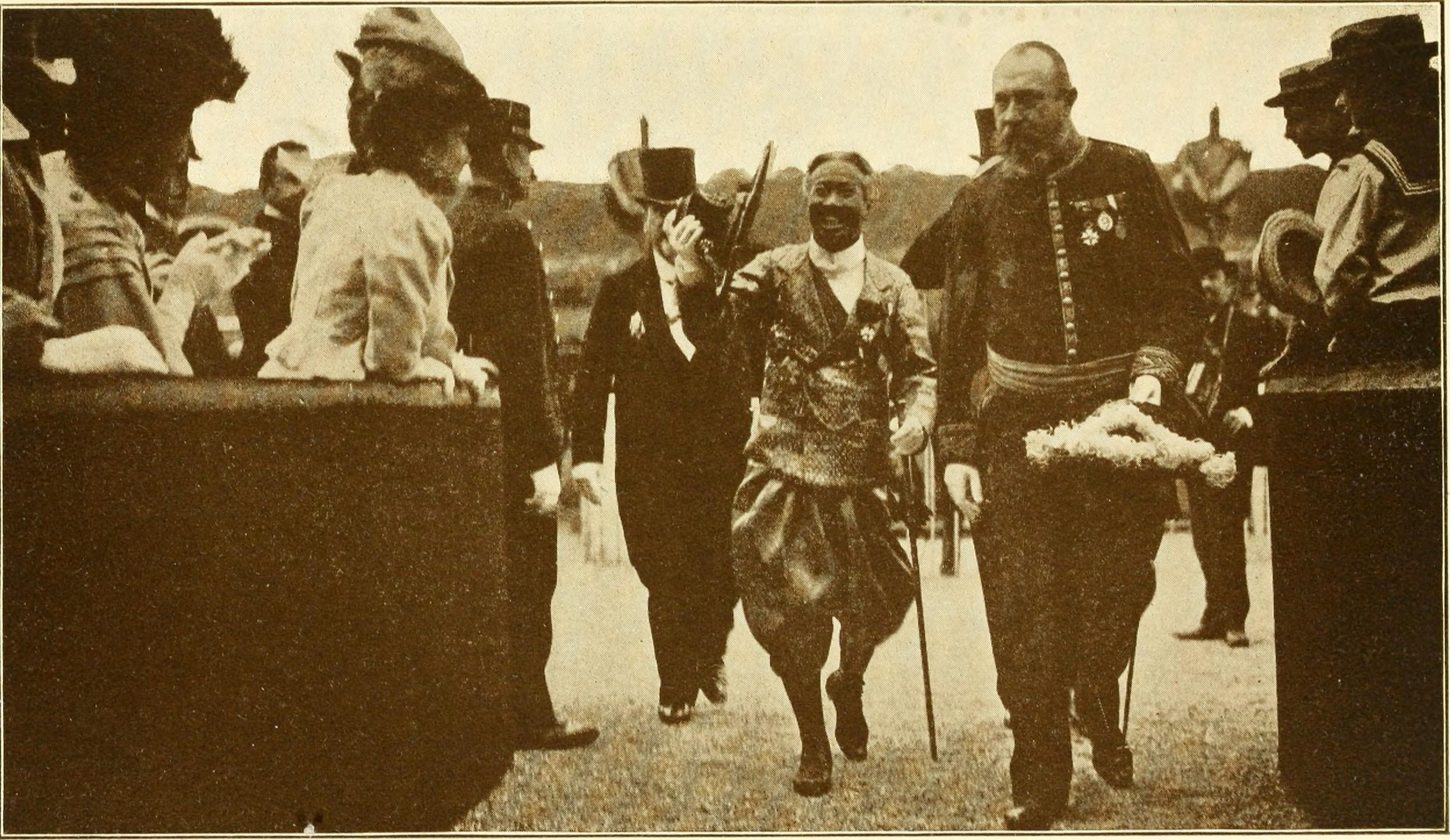
King Sisowath greeting officials during a visit to France, 1911.

A treaty was signed in 1863 by King Norodom and was approved by his counterpart Napoleon III. Cambodia officially became a protectorate of the French empire on 11 August 1863. In October 1949, the Maoist dictator Pol Pot (Saloth Sâr) went to Paris to join the French Communist Party and returns home to his native Cambodia in the summer of 1953. Cambodia gained its independence in November 1953, thanks to Prince Norodom Sihanouk.

French president Charles de Gaulle visited Cambodia in 1966 and was given a warm welcome by Prince Norodom Sihanouk.

France and Cambodia enjoy close relations, stemming partly from the days of the French Protectorate, partly from the role played by France in the signing of the peace agreements in Paris in 1991, and is further cemented by the French language. These relations are gradually adapting to Cambodia's growing integration into its regional environment and its progress towards the status of a Middle Income Country. The "Orientation and Cooperation Document" signed in 2010 steers cooperation towards the goal of: "supporting economic growth and job creation in Cambodia by developing human capital and promoting French private investment".

== French assistance ==
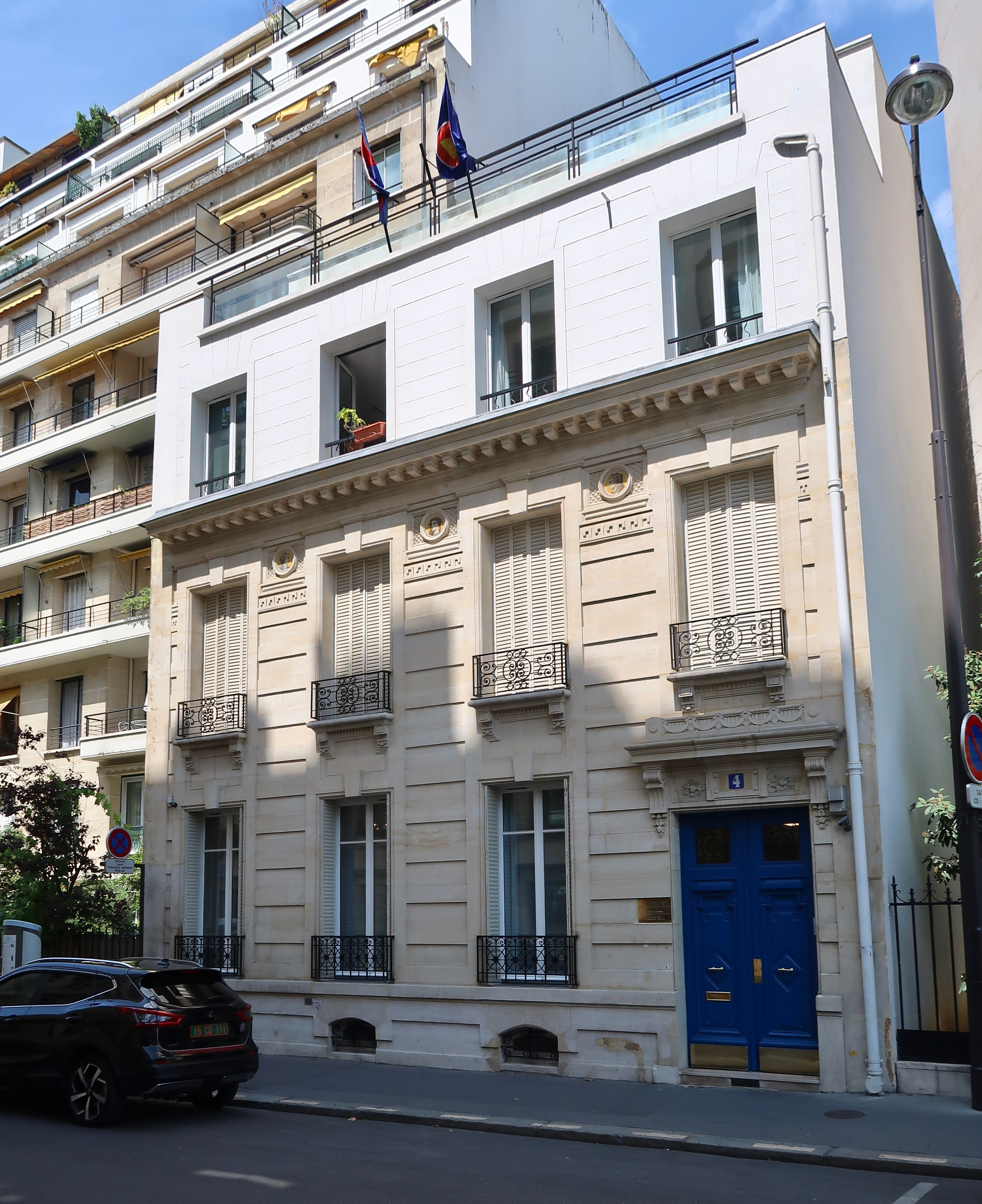
Embassy of Cambodia in Paris

France was part of the United Nations Transitional Authority in Cambodia.

== Migration ==
France has one of the largest Cambodian diaspora communities outside the United States, largely because of the refugees who fled Cambodia to escape the Khmer Rouge in the 1970s. As of 2015, there are around 80,000 Cambodians living in France. A Cambodian restaurant Le Petit Cambodge was among the sites of the November 2015 Paris attacks, though it is unclear whether any Cambodians were among those killed.

== Resident diplomatic missions ==
- Cambodia has an embassy in Paris.
- France has an embassy in Phnom Penh.

== See also ==
- Little Cambodia
- Phnom Penh speech
- Indians in Cambodia
- French language in Cambodia
