= Institut Français d'Indonésie =

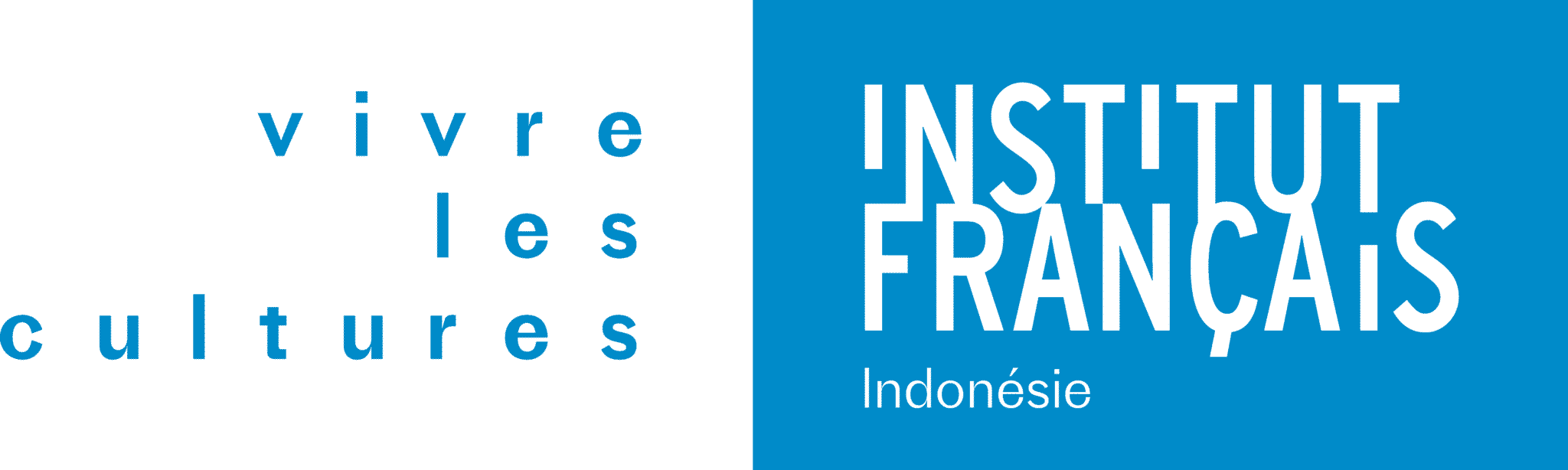
- Predecessor: Centre Culturel Français (CCF)
- Formation: 2012 (IFI)
- Type: Cultural center
- Headquarters: Jl. M. H. Thamrin no 20; Jakarta Pusat 10350 Indonesia
- Coordinates: 6°11′20.74″S 106°49′24.35″E
- Official language: French, Indonesian
- Director: Marc Piton
- Parent organization: Institut Français
- Subsidiaries: IFI Bandung, IFI Yogyakarta, IFI Surabaya
- Staff: 111
- Website: ifi-id.com

The Institut Français d'Indonésie or Institut Français Indonesia is an Institut français in Indonesia. It is a French public institution attached to the French Foreign Ministry. The promotion of French culture and language overseas is its main mission. Its main location is in Jakarta.

== History ==
Founded in 1970s, Centre Culturel Français (CCF) was renamed Institut Français in 2012. It is one of the biggest French cultural centers in the world, with over 5,000 students each year. In 2015, its Jakarta headquarters moved from Salemba, near Universitas Indonesia, to Thamrin. The new venue, of 400 square meters, is equipped with a library, a restaurant and an auditorium, equipped for DCP film screenings.

From 1996 to 2015, CCF and then IFI organized the French Film Festival, Festival Sinema Perancis, one of the oldest foreign film festivals in Indonesia. The Printemps Français, organized from 2006 to 2016 aimed to showcase the best of French contemporary creation.

== Cultural activities ==
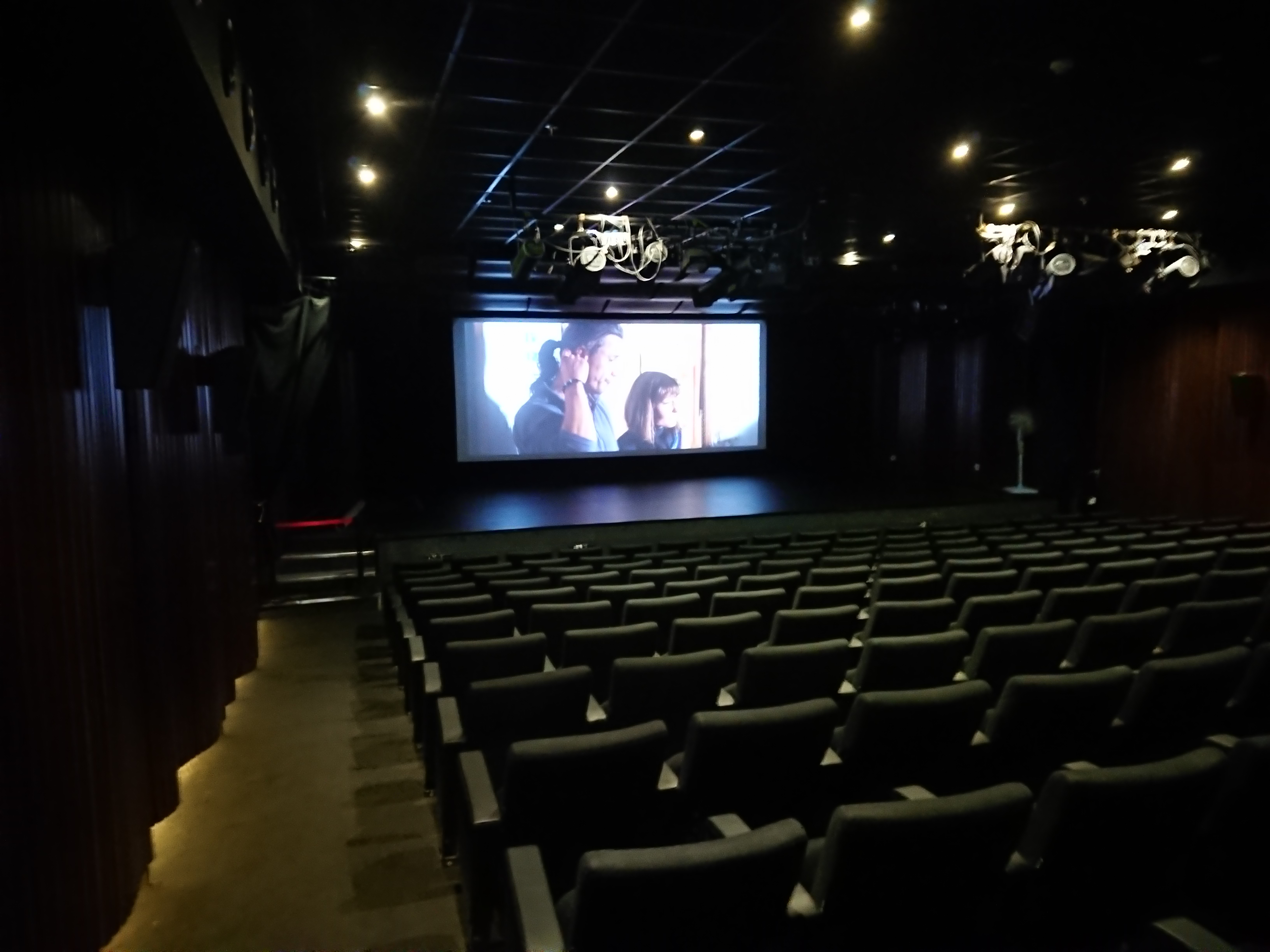
Auditorium of IFI Jakarta in Thamrin.

IFI is organizing several events, like regular film screenings (Ciné-Macet), concerts (Supersonik), seminars, discussions and dance performances. It also hosts numerous festivals, like Europe on Screen, 100% Manusia Film Festival or Madani Film Festival.

It participates in many international events, such as Good France, or Ma Thèse en 180 secondes, for young researchers.

== Antennas ==
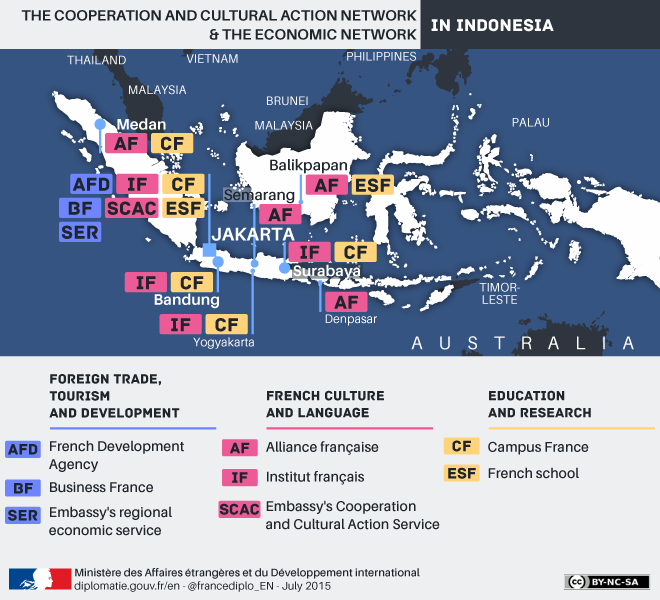
Map of the French cooperation, cultural action and economic network in Indonesia.

Institut Français d'Indonésie is active in four cities :

- Jakarta—Thamrin
- Jakarta—Wijaya
- Bandung
- Yoygyakarta
- Surabaya

It is also present in East Timor, with one antenna in Dili.

IFI also works with the two actives Alliances Françaises of the archipelago, located in Denpasar and Medan.
