= List of diplomatic missions in France =

This article lists diplomatic missions resident in France. At present, the capital city of Paris hosts 162 embassies. Major cities such as Lyon, Marseille, and Strasbourg are host to consulates and consulates-general.

France also hosts the headquarters of international organizations, the most important being the Organisation for Economic Co-operation and Development (OECD) and the United Nations Educational, Scientific and Cultural Organization (UNESCO) in Paris, and the Council of Europe in Strasbourg. As such, several sending countries may have missions or delegations to those organizations that are separate from their embassies in Paris or their consulates in Strasbourg.

Several other countries have non-resident ambassadors accredited to France, with most being resident in Brussels or London.

This listing excludes honorary consulates and trade missions.

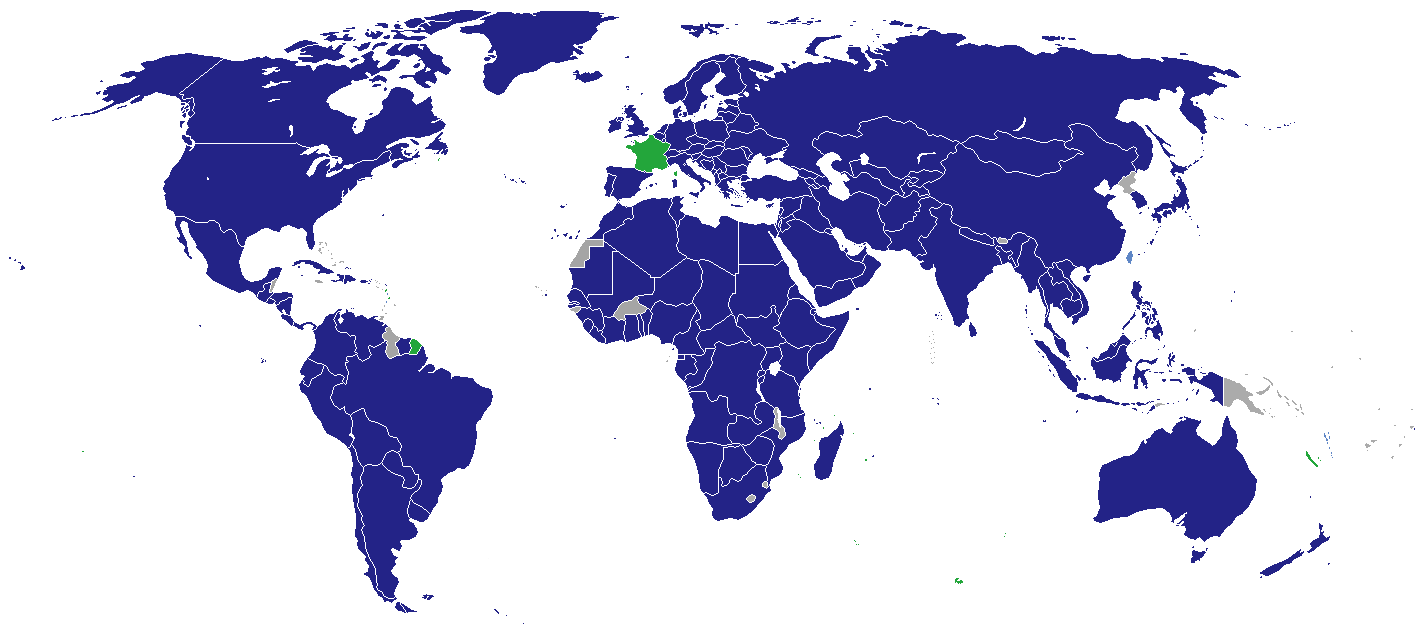
Map of diplomatic missions in France

== Diplomatic missions in Paris ==
=== Embassies ===
1. Afghanistan (Note: As of 2024, France recognized Islamic Republic of Afghanistan as de jure legitimate government of Afghanistan.)
2. Albania
3. Algeria
4. Andorra
5. Angola
6. Antigua and Barbuda
7. Argentina
8. Armenia
9. Australia
10. Austria
11. Azerbaijan
12. Bahrain
13. Bangladesh
14. Belarus
15. Belgium
16. Benin
17. Bolivia
18. Bosnia and Herzegovina
19. Botswana
20. Brazil
21. Brunei
22. Bulgaria
23. Burundi
24. Cambodia
25. Cameroon
26. Canada
27. Cape Verde
28. Central African Republic
29. Chad
30. Chile
31. China
32. Colombia
33. Comoros
34. Congo-Brazzaville
35. Congo-Kinshasa
36. Costa Rica
37. Croatia
38. Cuba
39. Cyprus
40. Czech Republic
41. Denmark
42. Djibouti
43. Dominican Republic
44. Ecuador
45. Egypt
46. El Salvador
47. Equatorial Guinea
48. Eritrea
49. Estonia
50. Ethiopia
51. Finland
52. Gabon
53. Gambia
54. Georgia
55. Germany
56. Ghana
57. Greece
58. Guatemala
59. Guinea
60. Guinea-Bissau
61. Haiti
62. Holy See
63. Honduras
64. Hungary
65. Iceland
66. India
67. Indonesia
68. Iran
69. Iraq
70. Ireland
71. Israel
72. Italy
73. Ivory Coast
74. Japan
75. Jordan
76. Kazakhstan
77. Kenya
78. Kosovo
79. Kuwait
80. Kyrgyzstan
81. Laos
82. Latvia
83. Lebanon
84. Liberia
85. Libya
86. Lithuania
87. Luxembourg
88. Madagascar
89. Malaysia
90. Mali
91. Malta
92. Mauritania
93. Mauritius
94. Mexico
95. Moldova
96. Monaco
97. Mongolia
98. Montenegro
99. Morocco
100. Mozambique
101. Myanmar
102. Namibia
103. Nepal
104. Netherlands
105. New Zealand
106. Nicaragua
107. Niger
108. Nigeria
109. North Macedonia
110. Norway
111. Oman
112. Pakistan
113. Palestine
114. Panama
115. Paraguay
116. Peru
117. Philippines
118. Poland
119. Portugal
120. Qatar
121. Romania
122. Russia
123. Rwanda
124. San Marino
125. Saudi Arabia
126. Senegal
127. Serbia
128. Seychelles
129. Sierra Leone
130. Singapore
131. Slovakia
132. Slovenia
133. Somalia
134. South Africa
135. South Korea
136. South Sudan
137. Spain
138. Sri Lanka
139. Sudan
140. Suriname
141. Sweden
142. Switzerland
143. Syria
144. Tajikistan
145. Tanzania
146. Thailand
147. Togo
148. Tunisia
149. Turkey
150. Turkmenistan
151. Uganda
152. Ukraine
153. United Arab Emirates
154. United Kingdom
155. United States
156. Uruguay
157. Uzbekistan
158. Venezuela
159. Vietnam
160. Yemen
161. Zambia
162. Zimbabwe

=== Missions to the Organisation for Economic Co-operation and Development (OECD) ===
1. Australia
2. Austria
3. Belgium
4. Canada
5. Chile
6. Colombia
7. Czechia
8. Denmark
9. Estonia
10. Finland
11. France
12. Germany
13. Greece
14. Hungary
15. Italy
16. Japan
17. Latvia
18. Lithuania
19. Luxembourg
20. Mexico
21. Netherlands
22. Norway
23. Poland
24. Portugal
25. Slovakia
26. Slovenia
27. South Korea
28. Sweden
29. Switzerland
30. Turkey
31. United States

=== Other missions or delegations or de facto embassies ===
- Catalonia (Delegation)
- Republic of China (Taiwan) (Representative Office)
- European Union (Office — Resident in Nouméa, New Caledonia)
- North Korea (General Delegation)
- Sahrawi Republic (Representative Office)
- Quebec (General Delegation)
- Wallonia (Delegation)

== Missions to the Council of Europe in Strasbourg ==
1. Albania
2. Armenia
3. Austria
4. Azerbaijan
5. Belgium
6. Bosnia and Herzegovina
7. Croatia
8. Cyprus
9. Czechia
10. Denmark
11. Finland
12. France
13. Georgia
14. Germany
15. Greece
16. Hungary
17. Iceland
18. Ireland
19. Italy
20. Latvia
21. Lithuania
22. Luxembourg
23. Malta
24. Mexico (Liaison Office)
25. Moldova
26. Montenegro
27. Netherlands
28. Norway
29. Poland
30. Portugal
31. Romania
32. Serbia
33. Slovakia
34. Slovenia
35. Spain
36. Sweden
37. Switzerland
38. Turkey
39. Ukraine
40. United Kingdom

== Consular missions ==
=== Aix-en-Provence ===
- Taiwan (Office)

=== Bastia ===
- Morocco (Consulate-General)

=== Bayonne ===
- Spain (Consulate-General)

=== Besançon ===
- Algeria (Consulate)

=== Bobigny ===
- Algeria (Consulate)

=== Bordeaux ===
- Algeria (Consulate)
- Germany (Consulate-General)
- Morocco (Consulate-General)
- Portugal (Consulate-General)
- Senegal (Consulate-General)
- Spain (Consulate-General)
- Turkey (Consulate-General)
- United Kingdom (Consulate-General)
- United States (Consulate-General)

=== Cayenne, French Guiana ===
- Brazil (Consulate-General)
- Haiti (Consulate-General)
- Suriname (Consulate-General)

=== Colombes ===
- Morocco (Consulate-General)

=== Créteil ===
- Algeria (Consulate)

=== Dijon ===
- Morocco (Consulate-General)

=== Fort-de-France, Martinique ===
- Saint Lucia (Consulate-General)

=== Grenoble ===
- Algeria (Consulate)
- Tunisia (Consulate)

=== Lille ===
- Algeria (Consulate-General)
- Morocco (Consulate-General)

=== Lyon ===
- Algeria (Consulate-General)
- Armenia (Consulate-General)
- Bulgaria (Consulate-General)
- China (Consulate-General)
- Germany (Consulate-General)
- Hungary (Consulate)
- Ireland (Consulate-General)
- Italy (Consulate-General)
- Ivory Coast (Consulate-General)
- Japan (Consular Office)
- Morocco (Consulate-General)
- Poland (Consulate-General)
- Portugal (Consulate-General)
- Romania (Consulate-General)
- Senegal (Consulate-General)
- Spain (Consulate-General)
- Switzerland (Consulate-General)
- Tunisia (Consulate-General)
- Turkey (Consulate-General)
- Ukraine (Consulate-General)
- United States (Consulate-General)

=== Marseille ===
- Algeria (Consulate-General)
- Armenia (Consulate-General)
- Belgium (Consulate-General)
- Brazil (Consulate-General)
- Cameroon (Consulate)
- China (Consulate-General)
- Dominican Republic (Consulate-General)
- Egypt (Consulate-General)
- Germany (Consulate-General)
- India (Consulate-General)
- Indonesia (Consulate-General)
- Italy (Consulate-General)
- Japan (Consulate-General)
- Lebanon (Consulate-General)
- Libya (Consulate-General)
- Madagascar (Consulate-General)
- Morocco (Consulate-General)
- Panama (Consulate-General)
- Portugal (Consulate-General)
- Romania (Consulate-General)
- Russia (Consulate-General)
- Senegal (Consulate-General)
- Spain (Consulate-General)
- Switzerland (Consulate-General)
- Tunisia (Consulate-General)
- Turkey (Consulate-General)
- United Kingdom (Consulate-General)
- United States (Consulate-General)

=== Metz ===
- Algeria (Consulate)
- Italy (Consulate-General)

=== Montpellier ===
- Algeria (Consulate)
- Morocco (Consulate-General)
- Spain (Consulate-General)

=== Nanterre ===
- Algeria (Consulate)

=== Nantes ===
- Algeria (Consulate)
- Portugal (Consulate)
- Turkey (Consulate-General)

=== Nice ===
- Algeria (Consulate)
- Cape Verde (Consulate-General)
- Italy (Consulate-General)
- Tunisia (Consulate-General)

=== Nouméa, New Caledonia ===
- Australia (Consulate-General)
- Indonesia (Consulate-General)
- Japan (Consular Office)
- New Zealand (Consulate-General)
- Vanuatu (Consulate-General)

=== Orléans ===
- Morocco (Consulate-General)

=== Orly ===
- Morocco (Consulate-General)

=== Pantin ===
- Spain (Consulate-General)
- Tunisia (Consulate)

=== Papeete, French Polynesia ===
- Australia (Consulate-General)
- China (Consulate-General)

=== Pau ===
- Spain (Consulate-General)

=== Perpignan ===
- Spain (Consulate-General)

=== Pointe-à-Pitre, Guadeloupe ===
- Dominican Republic (Consulate-General)
- Haiti (Consulate-General)

=== Pontoise ===
- Algeria (Consulate)
- Morocco (Consulate-General)

=== Rennes ===
- Morocco (Consulate-General)
- United States (Consulate-General)

=== Saint-Denis, Réunion ===
- China (Consulate-General)
- India (Consulate-General)
- Madagascar (Consulate-General)

=== Saint-Étienne ===
- Algeria (Consulate)

=== Saint-Georges, French Guiana ===
- Brazil (Consulate)

=== Saint-Laurent-du-Maroni, French Guiana ===
- Suriname (Consulate)

=== Strasbourg ===
- Algeria (Consulate-General)
- Austria (Consulate-General)
- Germany (Consulate-General)
- Holy See (Office)
- Japan (Consulate-General)
- Kazakhstan (Consulate-General)
- Kosovo (Consulate-General)
- Luxembourg (Consulate-General)
- Morocco (Consulate-General)
- Northern Cyprus (Representative Office)
- Portugal (Consulate-General)
- Romania (Consulate-General)
- Russia (Consulate-General)
- Serbia (Consulate-General)
- Spain (Consulate-General)
- Switzerland (Consulate-General)
- Tunisia (Consulate)
- Turkey (Consulate-General)
- United States (Consulate-General)

=== Toulon ===
- Tunisia (Consulate)

=== Toulouse ===
- Algeria (Consulate)
- Greece (Consulate-General)
- Morocco (Consulate-General)
- Portugal (Consulate-General)
- Spain (Consulate-General)
- Tunisia (Consulate)

=== Villemomble ===
- Morocco (Consulate-General)

== Non-resident embassies accredited to France ==
Resident in Berlin, Germany

- Lesotho

Resident in Brussels, Belgium

- Barbados
- Belize
- Eswatini
- Grenada
- Jamaica
- Malawi
- Papua New Guinea
- Samoa
- São Tomé and Príncipe
- Solomon Islands
- Timor-Leste
- Trinidad and Tobago

Resident in London, United Kingdom

- Bahamas
- Dominica
- Guyana
- Maldives
- Saint Vincent and the Grenadines
- Tonga

== Closed missions ==
Host city	Sending country	Mission	Year closed	Ref.
Paris	Benin	Permanent Mission to UNESCO	2020	
Paris	Benin	Permanent Mission to Francophonie	2020	
Paris	Burkina Faso	Embassy	2026	
Paris	Costa Rica	Permanent Mission to UNESCO	2020	
Paris	East Germany (Note: The East German embassy was closed upon the reunification of Germany in 1990, which saw the dissolution of the Democratic Republic of Germany.)	Embassy	1990	
Paris	Jamaica	Embassy (Note: Resident in Brussels, Belgium)	Unknown	
Paris	Malawi	Embassy	Unknown	
Paris	Philippines	Permanent Mission to UNESCO	1985	
Paris	Rhodesia	Mission (Note: Continues as an embassy of Republic of Zimbabwe.)	1977	
Ajaccio	Portugal	Consular office	2013	
Bastia	Italy	Consulate	2007	
Bordeaux	Switzerland	Consulate-General	2008	
Calais	United Kingdom	Consulate	1980	
Chambéry	Italy	Consulate	2008	
Clermont-Ferrand	Portugal	Vice-consulate	2012	
Fort-de-France, Martinique	Venezuela	Consulate-General	2019	
Dijon	Switzerland	Consulate	1995	
Le Havre	Colombia	Consulate	1988	
Lille	Belgium	Consulate-General	2015	
Lille	Italy	Consulate-General	2011	
Lille	Poland	Consulate-General	2013	
Lille	Portugal	Consular office	2012	
Lille	Spain	Consulate	2012	
Lille	United Kingdom	Consulate-General	2011	
Lyon	United Kingdom	Consulate-General	2012	
Marseille	Colombia	Consulate	1988	
Marseille	Cuba	Consulate-General	1976	
Marseille	Greece	Consulate-General	2016	
Marseille	Israel	Consulate-General	2016	
Marseille	Mexico	Consulate-General	1942	
Marseille	Sweden	Consulate-General	1993	
Marseille	Ukraine	Consulate	2014	
Marseille	Uruguay	Consulate-General	1997	
Metz	Spain	Consular agency	2011	
Mulhouse	Italy	Consulate	2010	
Nancy	Germany	Consulate-General	1995	
Nancy	Polish People's Republic	Consulate	1963	
Nancy	Portugal	Consulate	2005	
Nantes	Portugal	Vice-consulate	2012	
Nogent-sur-Marne	Portugal	Consulate	2008	
Nice	Greece	Consulate	2011	
Nice	United States	Consular agency	2015	
Orléans	Portugal	Consulate	2008	
Strasbourg	Belgium	Consulate-General	2015	
Strasbourg	Poland	Consulate-General	2008	
Toulouse	Angola	Consulate-General	2011	
Toulouse	Italy	Consulate	2013	
Toulouse	Polish People's Republic	Consulate	1963	
Tours	Portugal	Consulate	2008	
Versailles	Portugal	Consulate	2008	

== Embassies to open ==
- Papua New Guinea
- Timor-Leste

== See also ==
- Foreign relations of France
- List of diplomatic missions in Paris
- Visa requirements for French citizens
