= Tourism in Puducherry =

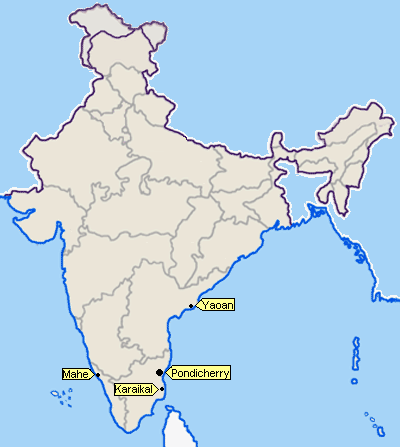
Map of India showing Pondicherry, Karaikal, Mahe and Yanam

Pondicherry is the capital city of the Union Territory of Puducherry and is one of the most popular tourist destinations in South India.

A French colony until 1954, this coastal town retains a number of colonial buildings, churches, statues, and systematic town planning, as well as urban architecture of the local Tamil style. As such the town has been dubbed "The Europe of India". The town struggles to preserve what little remains of the ambiance once created by this unique mix of cultural heritage. It nevertheless draws tourists from around the world and from across India. Recently after the advent of the internet and social media, Pondicherry has also become a popular weekend destination, which can be reached easily from the nearby cities such as Chennai and Bangalore, principally because lower taxation on alcoholic beverages makes drinking in the Union Territory enclave much less expensive than in neighboring states.

Due to its coastal influence, this town offers vast watersports events and water based tourism such as Boathouse, Kayaking, etc. which is similar to the facilities available in Goa. The water activities mostly happen at the Puducherry estuary area and at the backwaters of Puducherry where Mangrove forests were grown which provides a pleasant environment for visitors.

The main tourist attractions in and around the city are listed below.

== Sri Aurobindo Ashram ==
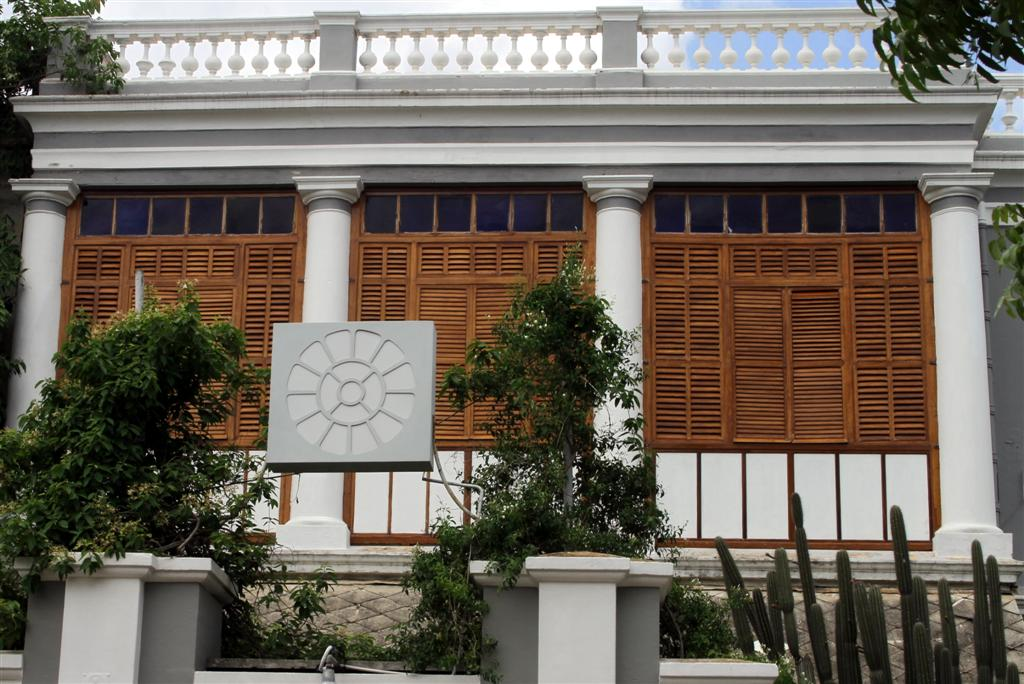
Sri Aurobindo Ashram, Pondicherry

The Sri Aurobindo Ashram is a well known spiritual ashram in India, with devotees and seekers from India and all over the world flocking to it for spiritual salvation. Its spiritual tenets represent a synthesis of yoga and modern science. The Ashram was founded in 1926 by Sri Aurobindo Ghose, an Indian freedom fighter, poet, philosopher, and yogi.

Mirra Alfassa (also known as ‘The Mother’: French: La Mère) was spiritual collaborator of Sri Aurobindo, who was born in Paris and was so inspired by his philosophy that she stayed on in Pondicherry. After 24 November 1926, when Sri Aurobindo retired into seclusion, she founded his ashram (Sri Aurobindo Ashram), with a handful of disciples living around the Master. With Sri Aurobindo's full approval she became the spiritual guru of the community, a position she held until her death. The Sri Aurobindo Ashram Trust, which she had registered after Sri Aurobindo's death in 1950 continues to look after the institution. The idea of Auroville or the "City of Dawn" was conceived by ‘The Mother’.

It is open to the public daily between 8 a.m. and 12 noon and 2 p.m. to 6 p.m. Children below 3 years of age are not allowed into the ashram and photography is not allowed. Some of the Ashram's facilities like the Library and the Main Building (during collective meditation) can be accessed, only after obtaining a gate pass from the Bureau Central or some of the Ashram Guest Houses. It is located on 12, Rue De La Marine.

== Auroville ==
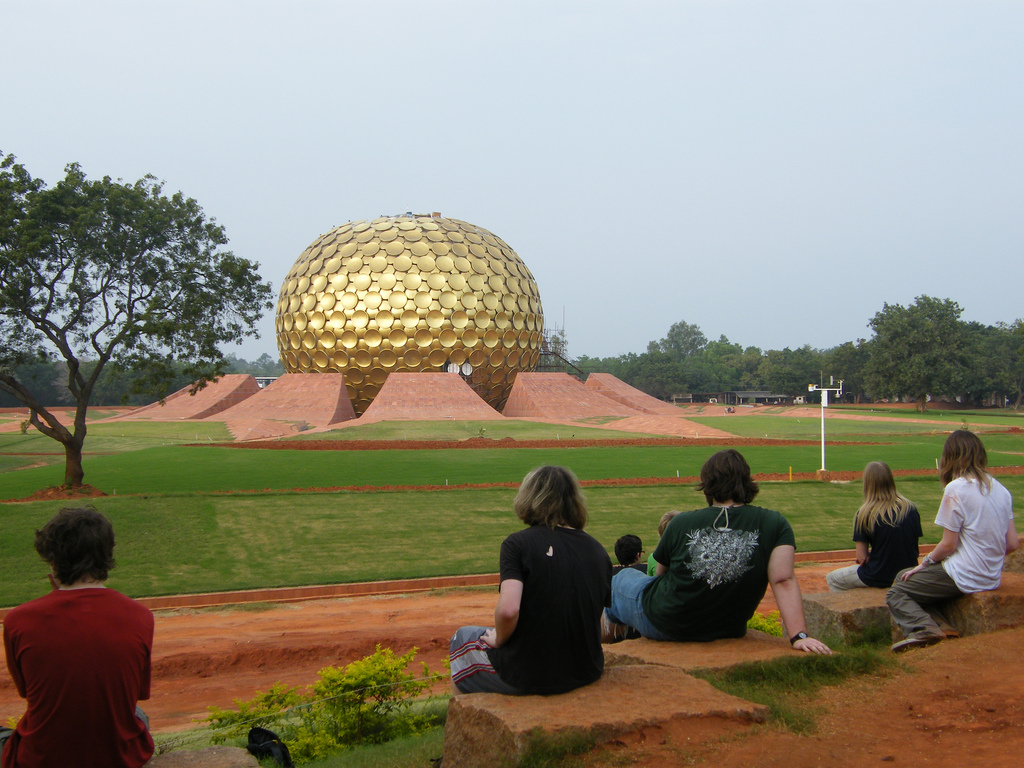
The Matrimandir, a golden metallic sphere in the center of town

Auroville (City of Dawn: French: Cité de l'aube) is an experimental township which is situated 8 km north-west of Pondicherry in East Coast Road Bommayapalayam. It was founded in 1968 by Mirra Alfassa (also known as The Mother), the spiritual collaborator of Sri Aurobindo. As per the Mother's vision and guidance Auroville was designed by the French architect Roger Anger. Auroville is meant to be a universal town where men and women of all countries are able to live in peace and progressive harmony, above all creeds, all politics and all nationalities. The purpose of Auroville is to realize human unity. During the inauguration ceremony of Auroville on 28 February 1968, soil from 124 countries was placed in a lotus-shaped urn and mixed to symbolize universal oneness. The Government of India and UNESCO has endorsed the project.

In the middle of the town is the Matrimandir, which has been acclaimed as "an outstanding and original architectural achievement." It was conceived by Alfassa as "a symbol of Universal Mother".

Although originally intended to house 50,000, the actual population today is 2,007 (1,553 adults and 454 minors), coming from 44 nationalities, 836 of whom are of Indian origin. The community is divided up into neighborhoods with English, Sanskrit, French and Tamil names like Aspiration, Arati, La Ferme, and Isaiambalam. The residents are involved in agriculture, administration, commerce and handicrafts, alternative technology, education, healthcare and development projects, the latter including AuroRE Systems, an international award-winning unit involved in solar photovoltaic and thermal systems.

== Monuments and statue ==
Gandhi Statue is a four-meter statue of Mahatma Gandhi is surrounded by eight granite pillars, which were supposedly brought from Gingee, a fort some 70 km from Pondicherry. Located across as an integral part of Pondicherry's colonial past. The 2.88 m tall statue of Dupleix stands at the southern end of the park. Even though Dupleix left Pondicherry in 1754, French recognition of his contribution came only in 1870, with the commissioning of two statues-one in Pondicherry and the other in France. It is situated in Goubert Avenue. Another example of the French influence in Pondicherry is a marble statue of the heroic French damsel Joan of Arc, which is located in front of the Church of Our Lady of the Angels. The statue is placed in the middle of a garden.statue was erected in 1923. It is situated at Dumas Street.

The French War Memorial on Goubert Avenue is reminder of those brave soldiers who laid down their lives, for their country during the First World War. It was built in 1971. Every year on 14 July (Bastille Day) the memorial is beautifully illuminated and homage is paid to those brave martyrs.

Aayi Mandapam (Park Monument) is a white monument built during the time of Napoleon III, Emperor of the France. It is situated in center of Bharathi Park. The monument commemorates the provision of water to the French city during his reign. It was named after a lady courtesan called Ayi. She destroyed her own house to erect a water reservoir to supply water for the city.

Monuments and statues

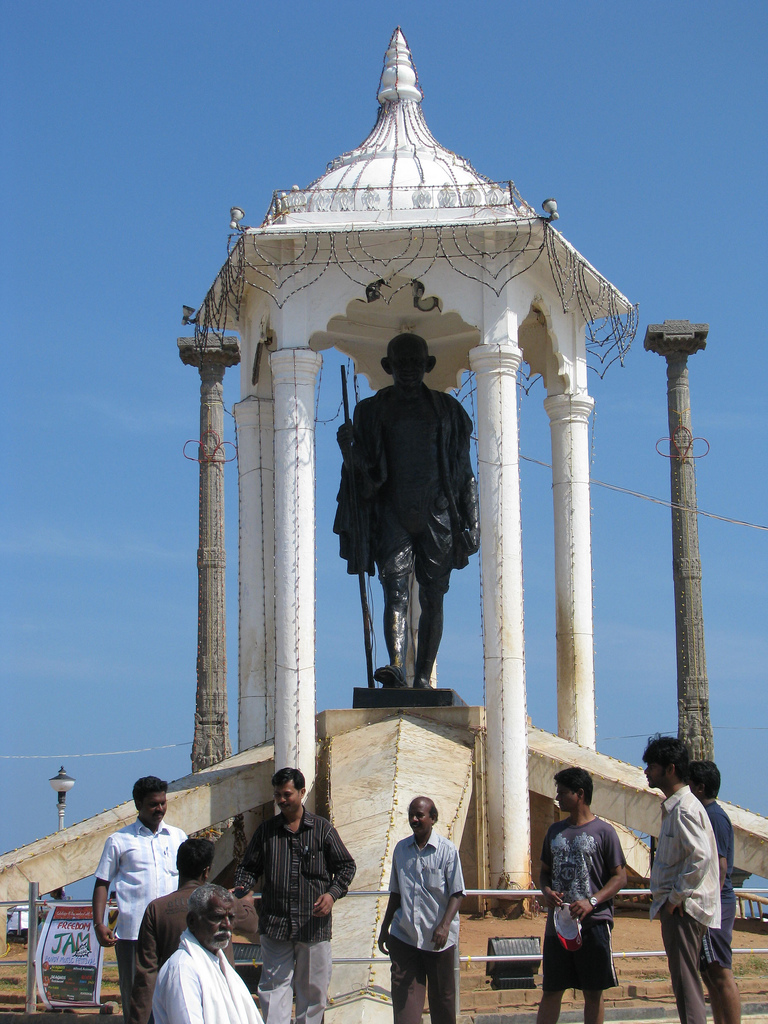
Mahatma Gandhi statue, Pondicherry

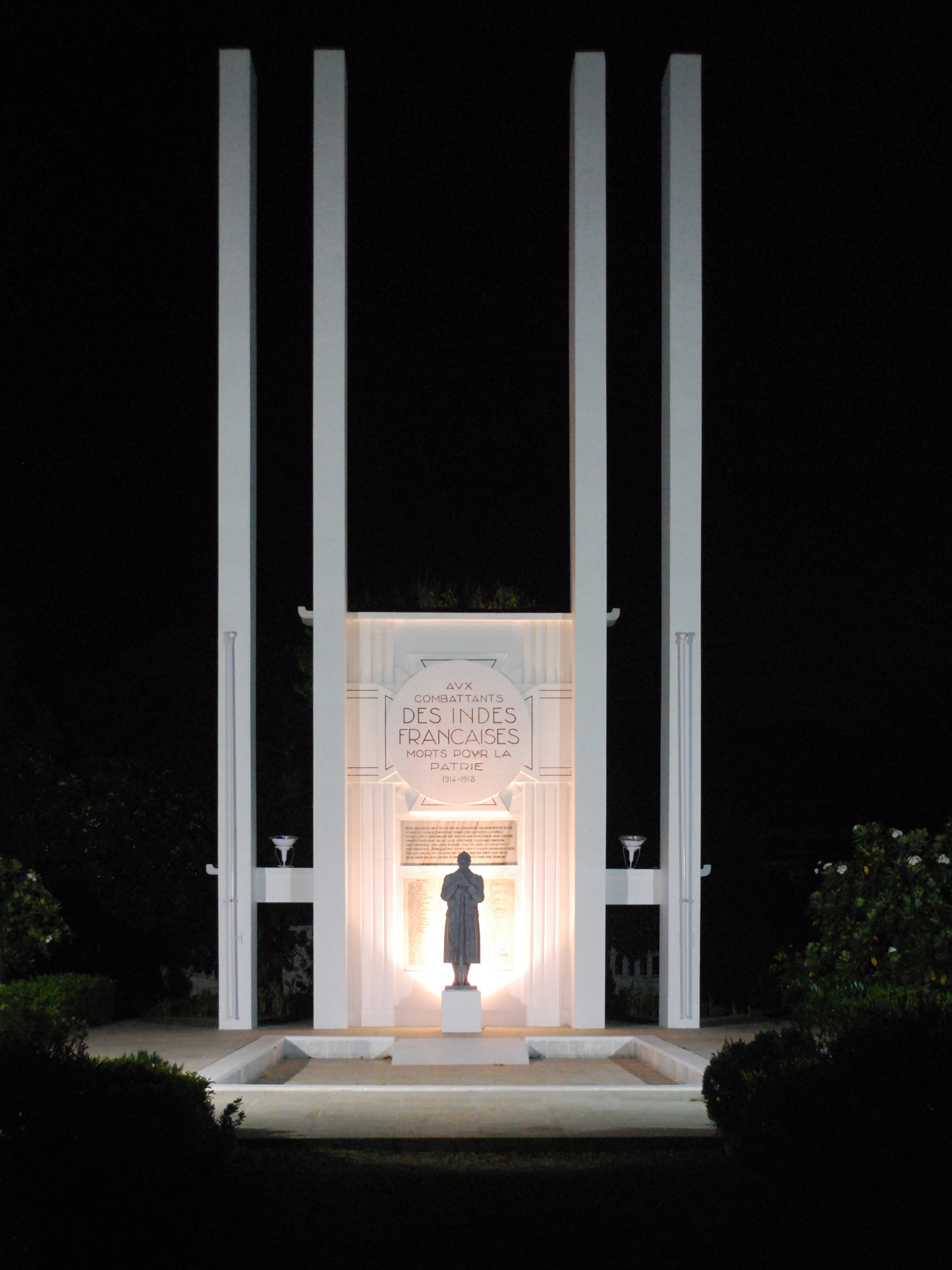
French War Memorial in Pondicherry

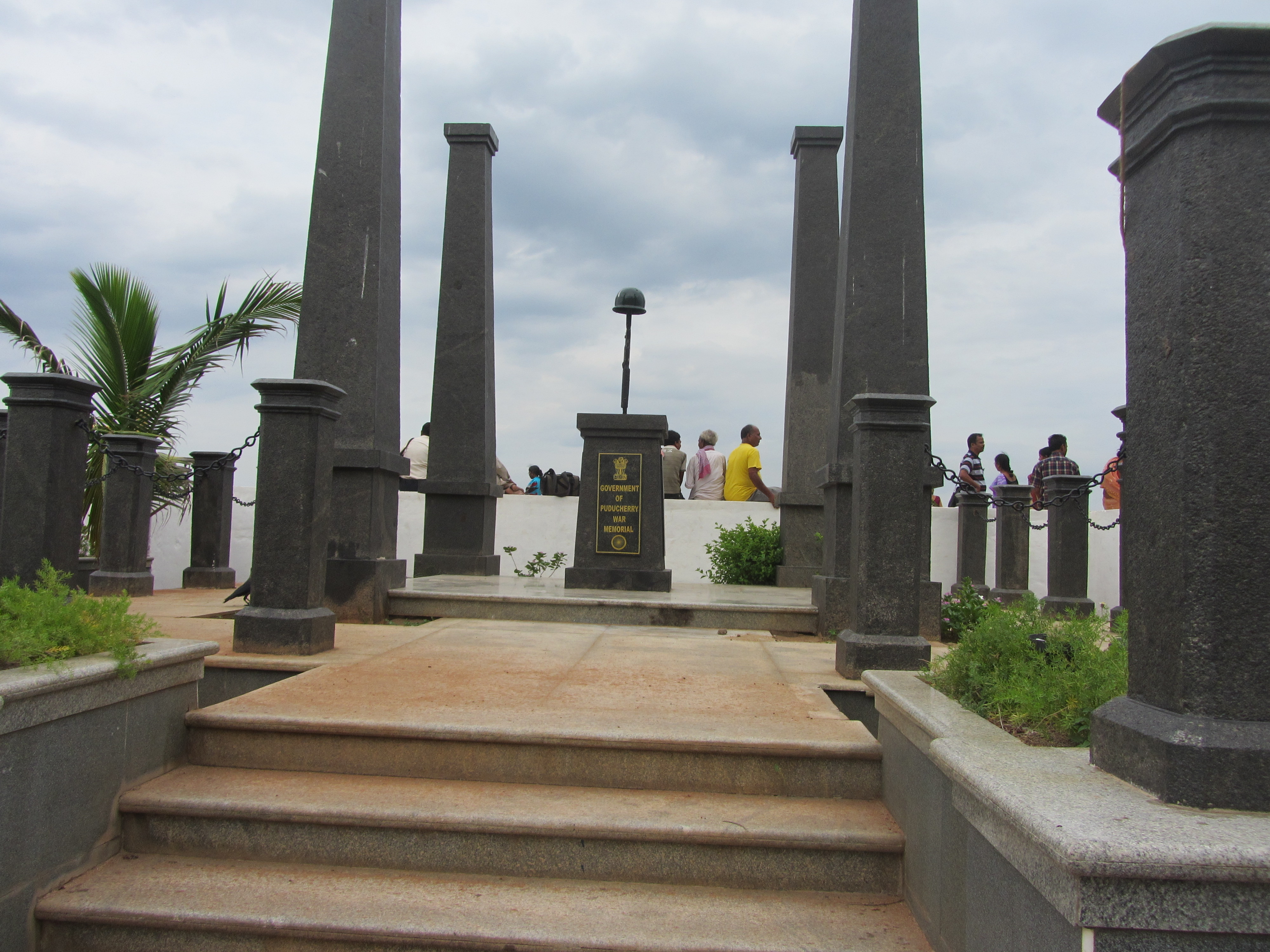
War memorial erected by the Puduchery Government on the Promenade Beach

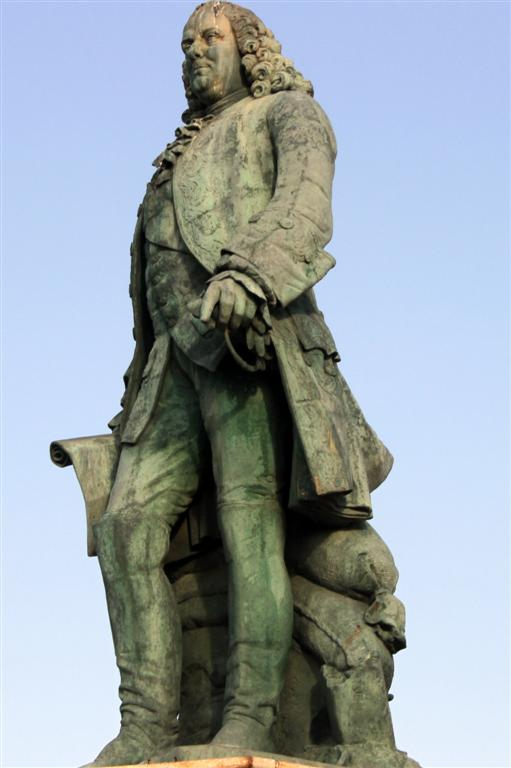
Joseph Francois Dupleix

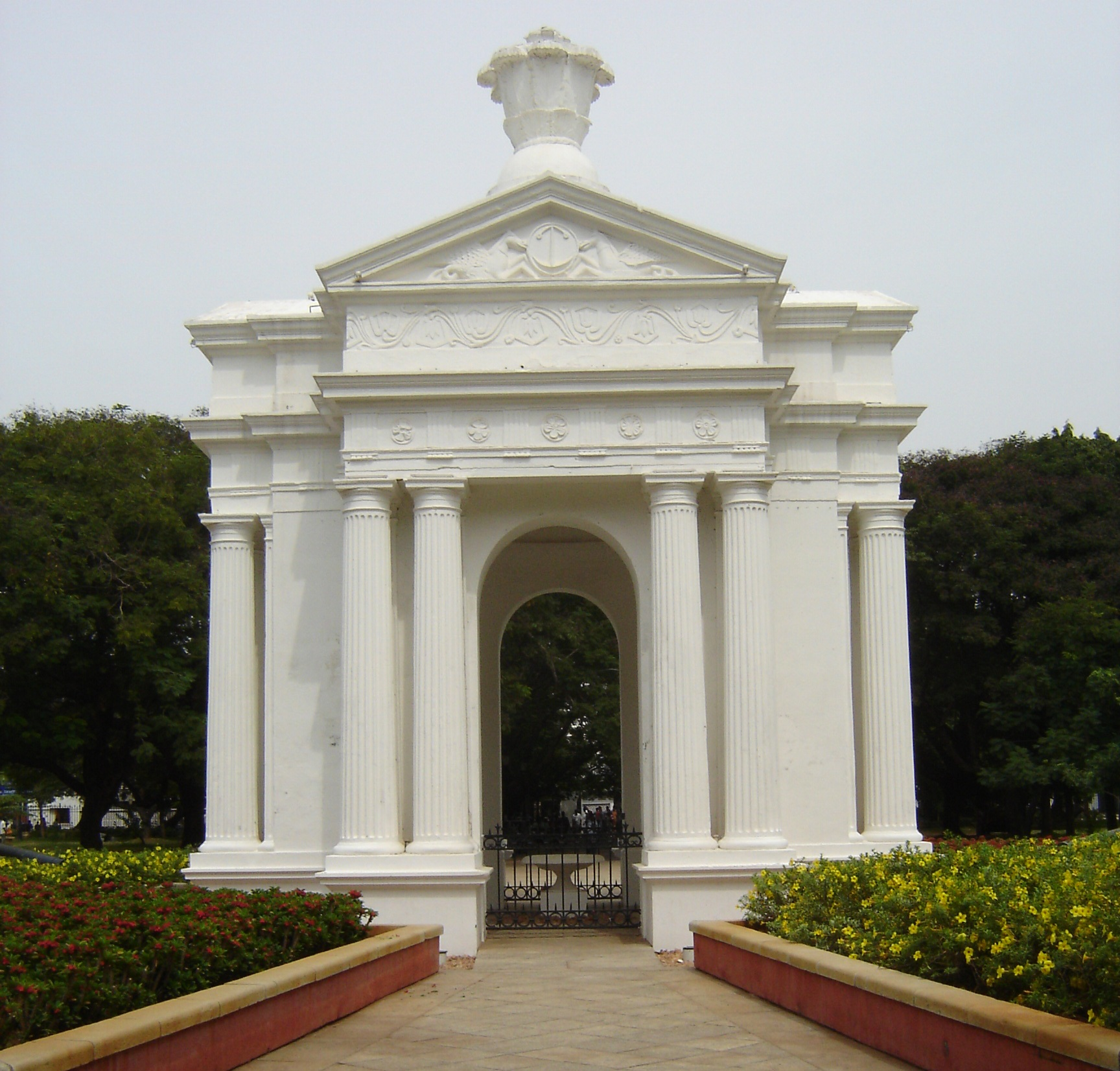
Park Monument (Aayi Mandapam) in the Government Park of Pondicherry

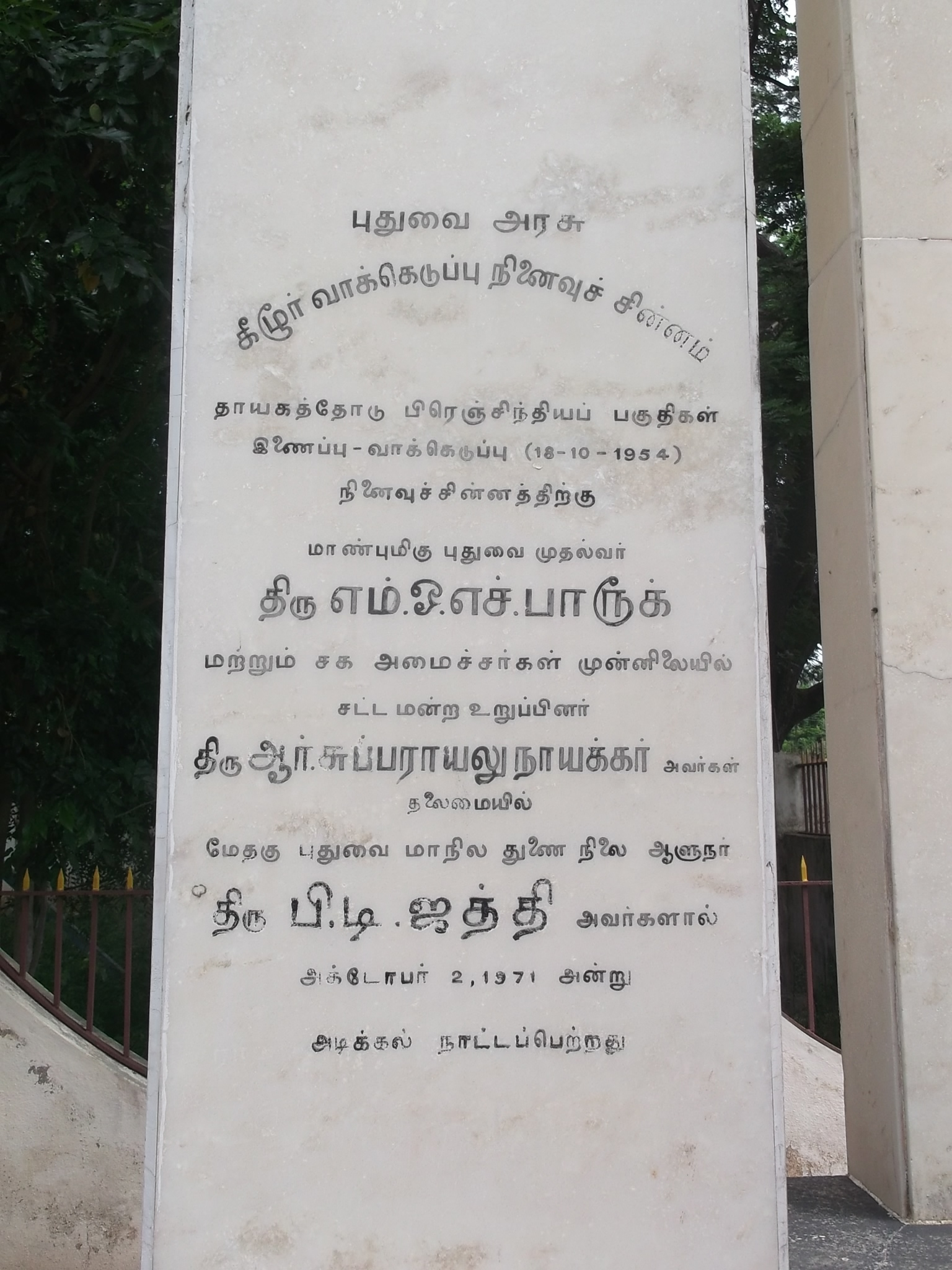
Puducherry Keezhur Monument

== Museums ==
Pondicherry Museum has a gallery with sculptures and has the remains of archaeological findings from the Arikamedu Roman settlement. The museum also has a collection of rare bronzes and stone sculptures from the Pallava and Chola dynasties and artifacts excavated from Arikamedu (an ancient port just 7 km from city that had trade links with the Roman Empire). The Arikamedu Archeological Site has several old buildings, oldest port which are available and accessible for visitors and tourist.

Pudhuvai Museum is a non-governmental museum operating by a non-profit organization. It is adjacent to the Botanical Garden in Pondicherry. The museum was inaugurated on April 8, 2018, by Chevalier, Justice Dr. David Annusamy, Hundreds of visitors visit the museum, which is run with the help of the National Heritage Trust. The Pudhuvai Museum, which is developing nationally and covers many disciplines, It has held several international exhibitions since its inception. This Museum appreciated by many great scholars, leaders, professors and many more, this museum is working to achieve a national museum status in the future. The gallery, which houses thousands of MAPS, is named after Indian cartographer Nine Singh Rawat. Currently, only 100 maps have been selected and displayed in this section. In this gallery engaged in an effort to preserve Maps of the past century

The Bharathidasan Museum, on No. 95 Perumal Koil Street, is the former house of the Pondicherry-born poet and playwright - Bharathidasan (1891–1960) (meaning "Disciple of Bharathi"). Bharathidasan's poems compare with Bharathi's in literary achievement and poetic fervour. He also wrote scripts for films on issues such as Dravidian culture and the rights of women.

Ananda Ranga Pillai was the dubash of Dupleix, the governor of Pondicherry while it flourished under the French rule. Pillai's compilation of diaries serve as a storehouse of information on the 18th century French India. His mansion, completed sometime in 1738, is one of the oldest surviving buildings on the west side - then known as "natives' quarters". Its architecture represents a fusion of French and Indian styles. This once lavishly furnished house offered glimpses into a bygone era and vanished lifestyle. However, today it has fallen upon hard times and retains very little of its former. Special permission is required to visit the mansion.

Subramanya Bharathi (1882–1921), commonly known as Bharathiyar, was a Tamil poet-patriot who arrived in Pondicherry in 1908, a fugitive from British India. The French atmosphere brought out the best in Bharathi and some of his finest patriotic and romantic compositions were born here. Bharathi's home also known as Bharathi Museum, on No. 20, Eswaran Dharamaraja Koil Street, is almost a place of pilgrimage today for the Tamil people.

Jawahar Toy Museum is located next to the old lighthouse on Goubert Avenue, the museum is open on all days except Monday. This museum has a collection of over 120 dolls, each one dressed in costumes from different Indian states. Also on display is a little "fairyland" with a tiny Ganesha watching over all the proceedings.

Children's Museum is located next to the Botanical Gardens, it has collections of snail shells from the Pondicherry region.

== Gardens and parks ==
=== Botanical Garden ===
The Botanical Garden (French: Le Jardin Botanique) is located south of the New Bus Stand. The gate leading to the garden is reminiscent of French architecture and it stands out from its immediate surroundings because it is in the middle of the old Tamil town. The Botanical Gardens were laid out in 1826 in the ornate French style, with pruned trees, flower beds and gravel lined paths and fountains. Perrottet was largely responsible for transforming the place into a botanical garden in 1831. The French introduced many exotic plants from all over the world. The gardens also have a musical fountain which is active over the weekends, with two shows in the evening.

=== Oussudu Bird Sanctuary ===
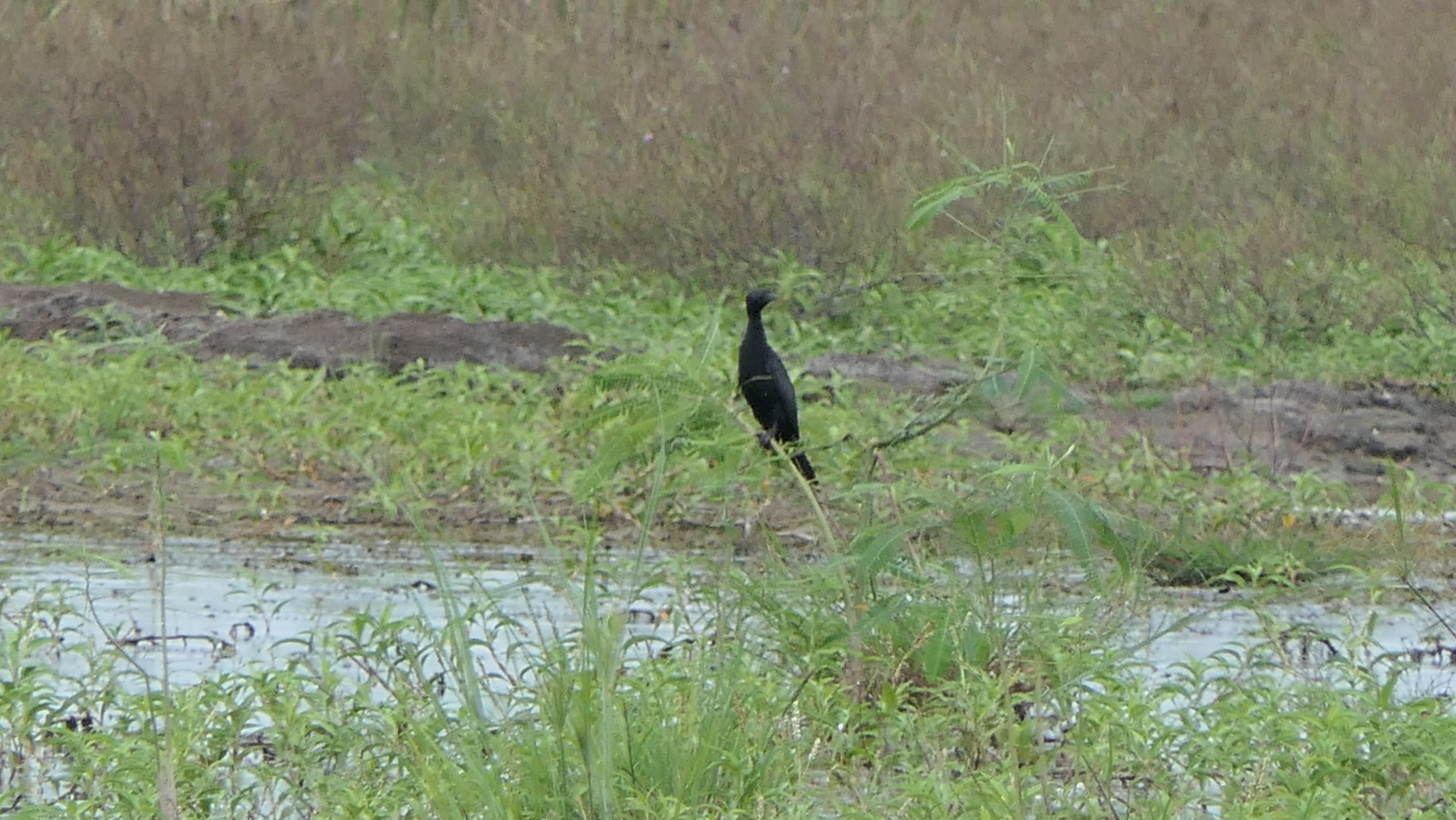
Great egret in the Oussudu Bird Sanctuary

Ousteri Lake (French: Lac Oustéri) is located towards north at a distance of 10 km from Pondicherry town (Pondicherry– Villupuram road). The wetland covers an area of about 390 ha (lies in both Tamil Nadu and Pondicherry) with a wide range of aquatic species and is mainly a bird sanctuary. The vegetation ranges from small herbs to trees, which supports migratory avifauna as well as native birds during summer and winter. The government of Pondicherry is proposing to set up an Ousteri National Park in the region acquiring lands from neighbouring villages.

=== Bharathi Park ===
The Government Park or Bharati Park (French: Le parc du gouvernement) is in the green centre of the town. The Aayi Mandapam is a famous monument which lies at the center of the Bharati Park. The Government Park in Pondicherry is aptly located in the central region of the old colonial town. The significance of this park is derived from the fact that it is surrounded by some of the most important government buildings like the Lt. Governor's Palace, the Legislative Assembly, Government Hospital, Ashram Dining Room, the Cercle de Pondichéry private club, and the old Hotel Qualité.

=== Science Park ===
Puducherry Science Centre & Planetarium (also known as Puducherry Science Park: French: Centre scientifique et planétarium de Pondichéry) located in Lawspet. The centre was designed, developed and set up by the National Council of Science Museums.The Science Demonstration Corner has provision to conduct live demonstration and experiments to groups of visitors and students to excite them about science. The "Children's Corner" is a place where children can enjoy simple experiments with a variety of puzzles and science kits.

=== National Fossil Wood Park ===
A deposit of petrified wood is located nearby, at National Fossil Wood Park, Tiruvakkarai in the Puducherry Sandstone Formation. More than 200 fossilised tree trunks are spread over an area of 247 acres in 9 enclosures. This was first documented in 1781 by the European Naturalist M. Sonneret.

=== Puducherry Canyon ===
It is located near to National Fossil Wood Park. This canyon is made up of sand stones. It is one of the biggest submarine canyon which is located along the coromandel coast. It is estimated to formed 2 crore years ago due to water currents. The national institute of oceanography made a detailed documentation in 1965 regarding the existence of canyons in coromandel coast. Government also constructed a geological park (Thiruvakkarai geo park) near the site.

Gardens & Parks

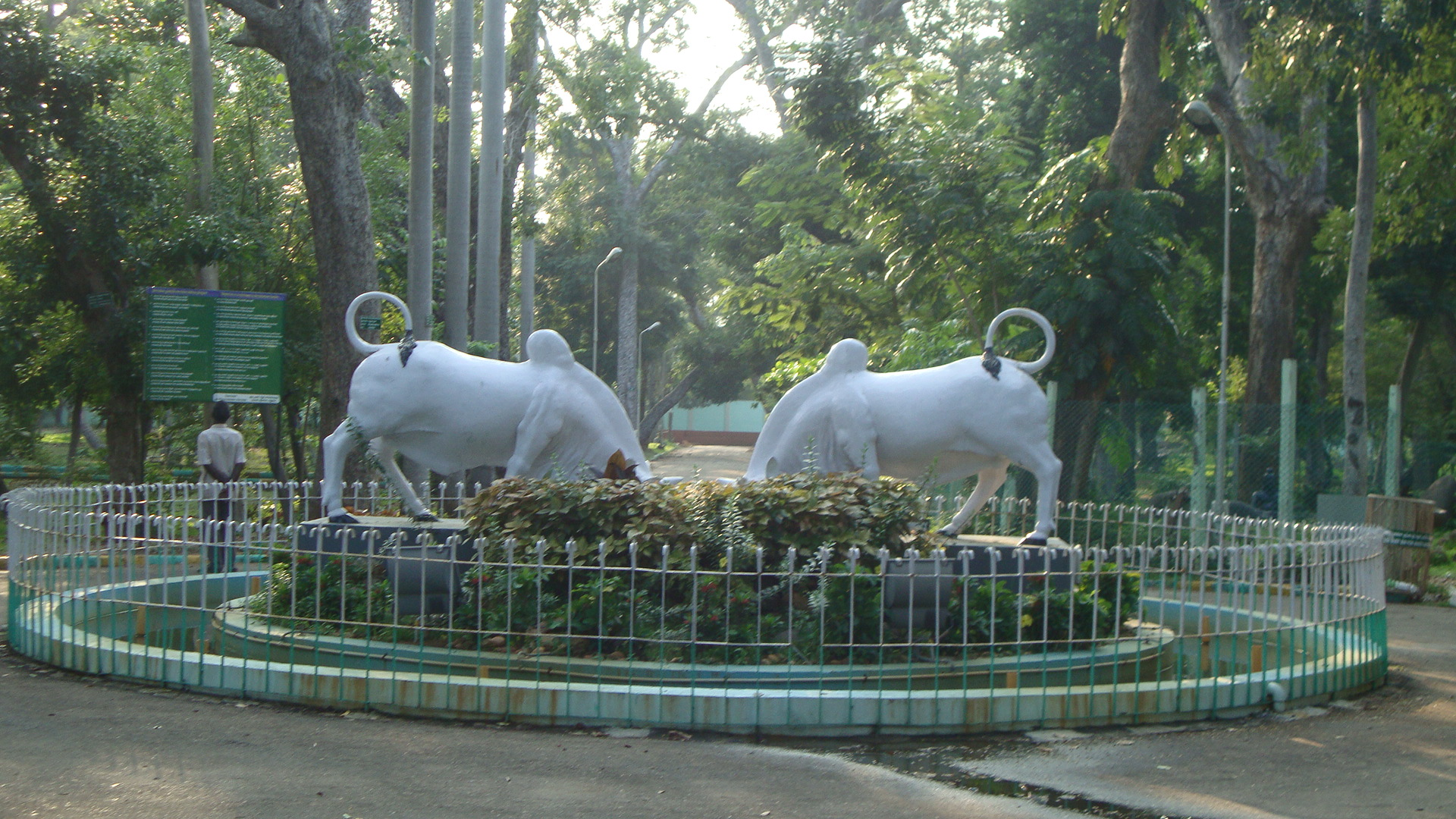
Botanical garden

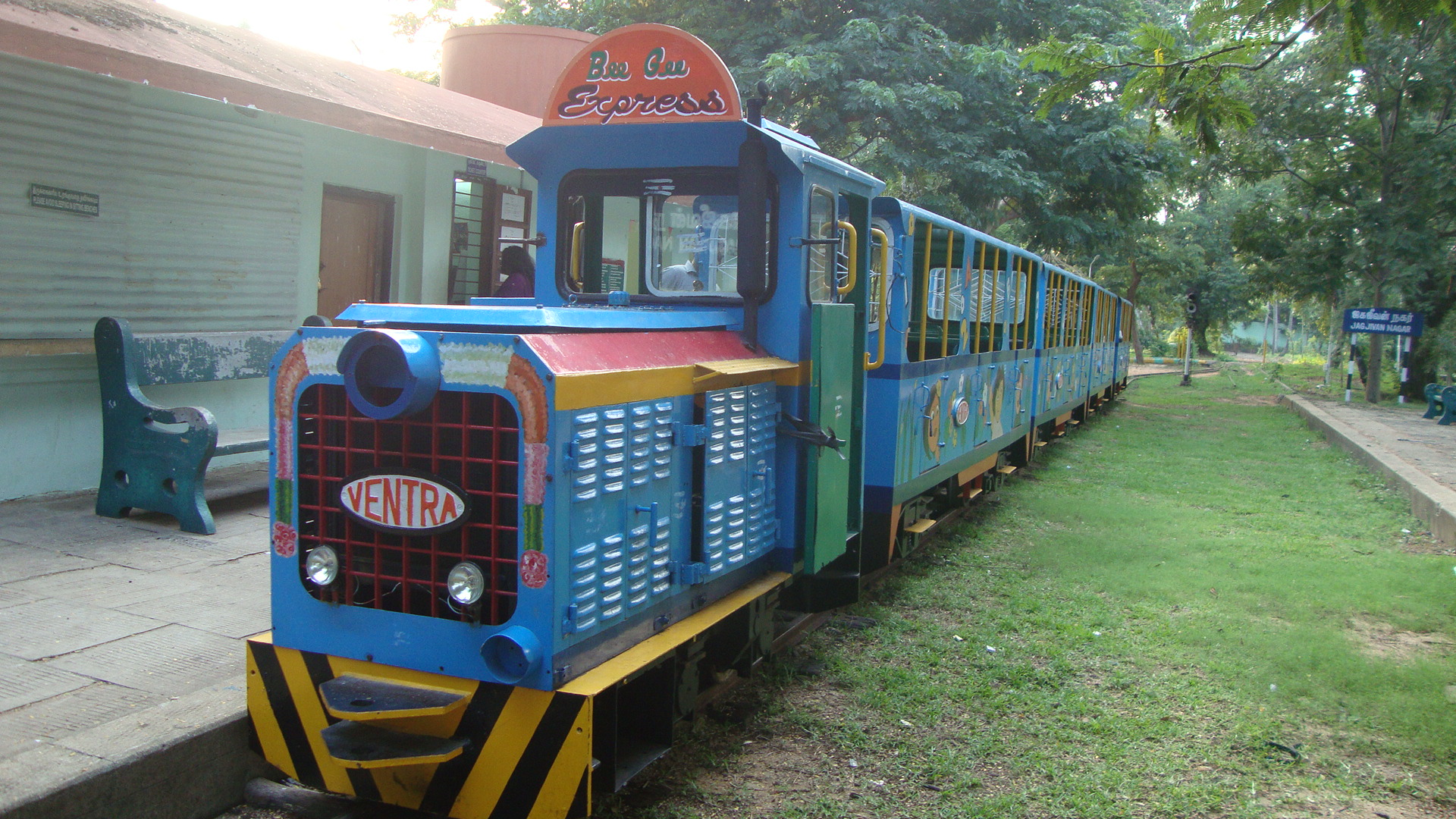
Children's train botanical garden

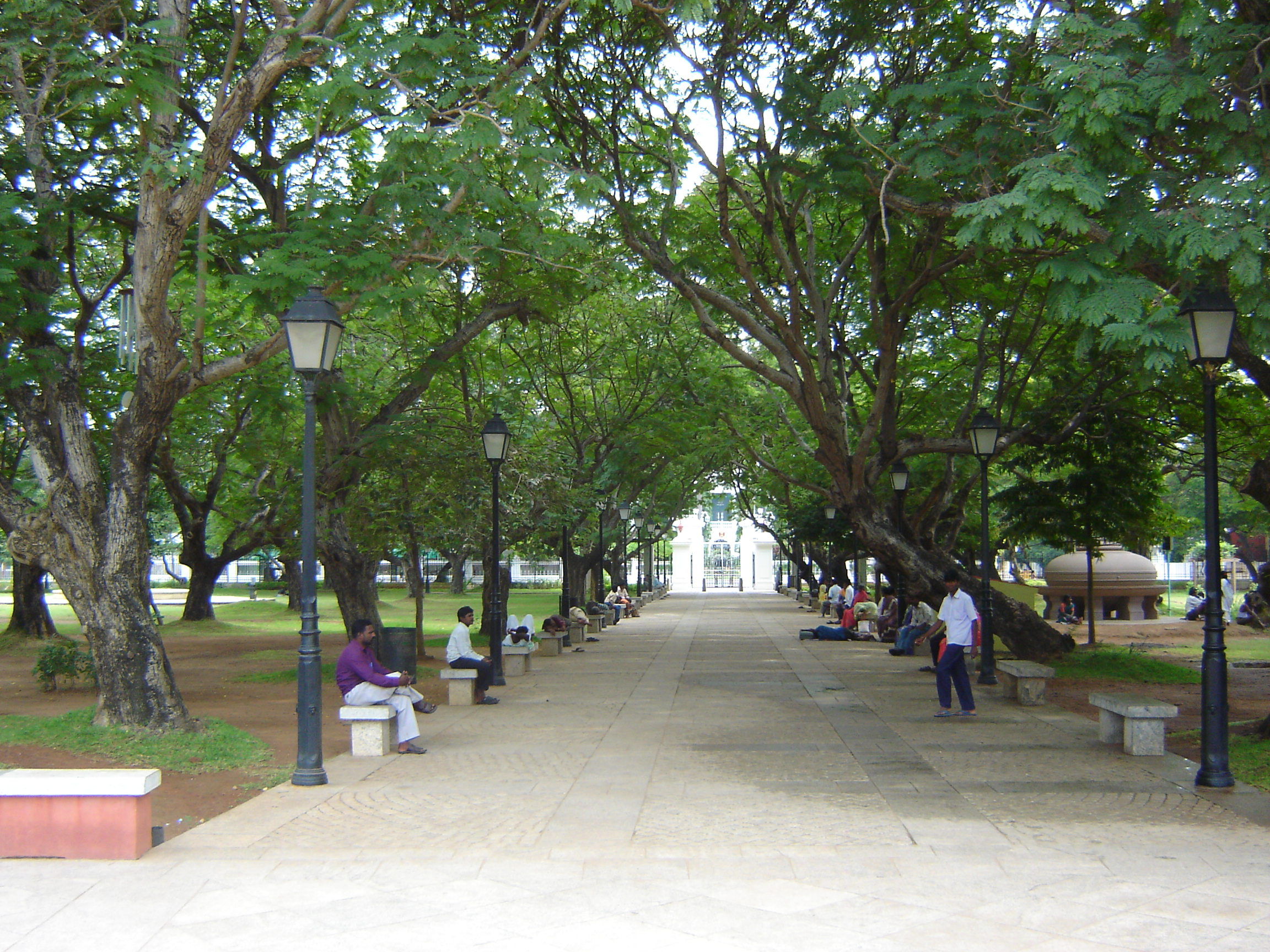
Bharati Park (Government Park)

== Places of worship ==
=== Hindu Temples ===
Sri Manakula Vinayagar Temple was in existence before the French came and settled in Pondicherry i.e. before 1666. It has a golden spire and walls portraying forty different forms of Ganesha. The temple also has a smaller shrine dedicated to Lord Murugan, who is Ganesha's younger brother. Over 5000 devotees flock to this site every day. There is also a temple elephant, Lakshmi, who gives blessings to the devotees.

Varadaraja Perumal Temple is located on M.G.Road, this is believed to be the oldest temple in town, dating back to 600 AD. The temple built in the typical Dravidian style, complete with brightly coloured "gopuram" and sculpted pillars. This temple is dedicated to Vishnu. Legend has it, that the temple was originally built for the idols of Rama, Sita, Lakshman and Hanuman, which were brought to the present site by fishermen, from the sea. The main deity here is Varadaraja perumal (Vishnu). Right behind that is a separate shrine for Narashima (who is also an avatar of Vishnu).

Vedhapureeswarar Temple also known as the Eashwaran koil, is located on M.G.Road and is dedicated to Shiva. It has colourful "gopuram", adorned by the statues of gods and goddesses, like most temples in South India.

Sri Vadukeeswarar Temple (Thiruvandarkoil) is located in Thirubuvanai, a village in Pondicherry on the Puducherry - Villupuram route. It is one of the Devara Paadal Petra Sthalams and it is constructed in a style that is similar to the Tanjore temple.

Kanniga Parameswari Temple, located on M.G.Road, is dedicated to the goddess Shakti and has a blend of both Tamil and French architecture. With its arched walls, ionic columns, stained glass windows and even some angel decorations, it is reminiscent of a French building. However, the inner ceiling supported by the more traditional granite pillars and the sanctum sanctoram, which has a typical Tamil design, highlights the more traditional Tamil features. Kamatchiamman Temple is located on Bharathi Street, this temple is different from most other South Indian temples by virtue of its lack of colour and ornamentation. Its starkness is what makes it stand out from the rest. This dark rust coloured temple is dedicated to Durga, the goddess of war.

Sri Ponniyamman Temple in Solai nagar it was in existence before the French came and settled in Pondicherry i.e. before 1760.

Sri senganiamman Temple in Solai nagar it was in existence before the French came and settled in Pondicherry i.e. before 1790.

=== Churches ===
Basilica of the Sacred Heart of Jesus, situated on the south boulevard, is an oriental specimen of Gothic architecture. It contains rare stained glass panels depicting events from the life of Christ. This church was supposed to have been erected in the 18th century by French Missionaries. Church of the Sacred Heart of Jesus is a Catholic church and is a white-and-brown structure.

The Eglise de Notre Dame des Anges (The Church of Our Lady of Angels), in Rue Dumas, is notable for its masonry – which uses the finest of limestone mixed with white of the egg – making for a texture identical to that of white marble. It is modelled on the Basilica at Lourdes, in southern France. The imposing façade presents paired Doric columns below and ionic above. In front of the church is a statue of Our Lady with the infant Jesus in her arms. The interior design consists of eight barrel vaults and a central dome pierced with eight circular openings.

The Cathedral of Our Lady of the Immaculate Conception, on Cathedral Street, was first built in 1692. It took its present shape in 1791.

Church of Capuchins holds the distinction of being one of the first churches in Pondicherry. Though this church has lost its old charm; it is still revered and houses an orphanage.

St. Andrew's Church is one of the oldest churches in the town built during 1745.

The other famous churches include the Church of the Assumption, Our Lady of Lourdes Shrine, and Church of Our Lady of Good Health.

Churches

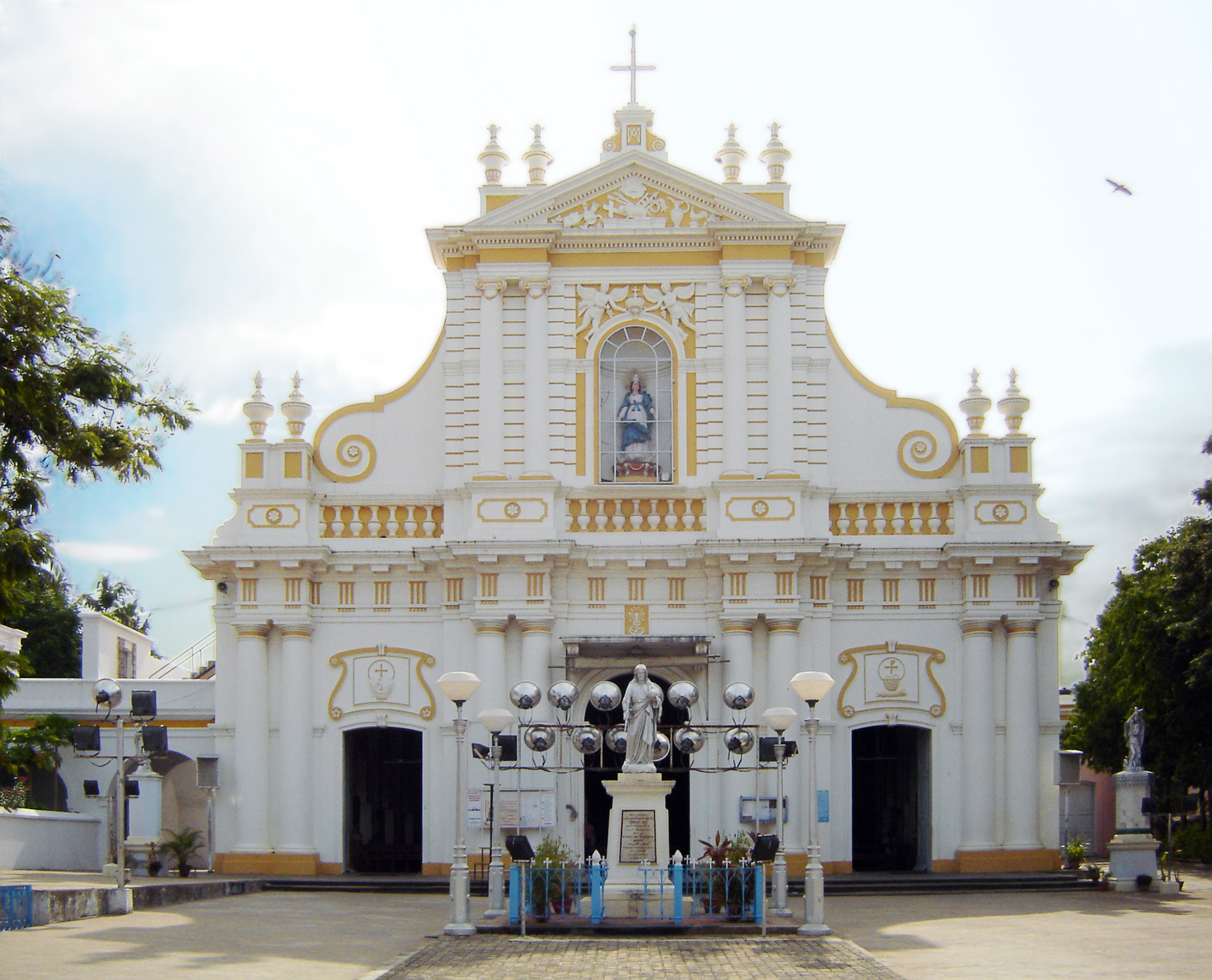
The Cathedral of Our Lady of the Immaculate Conception

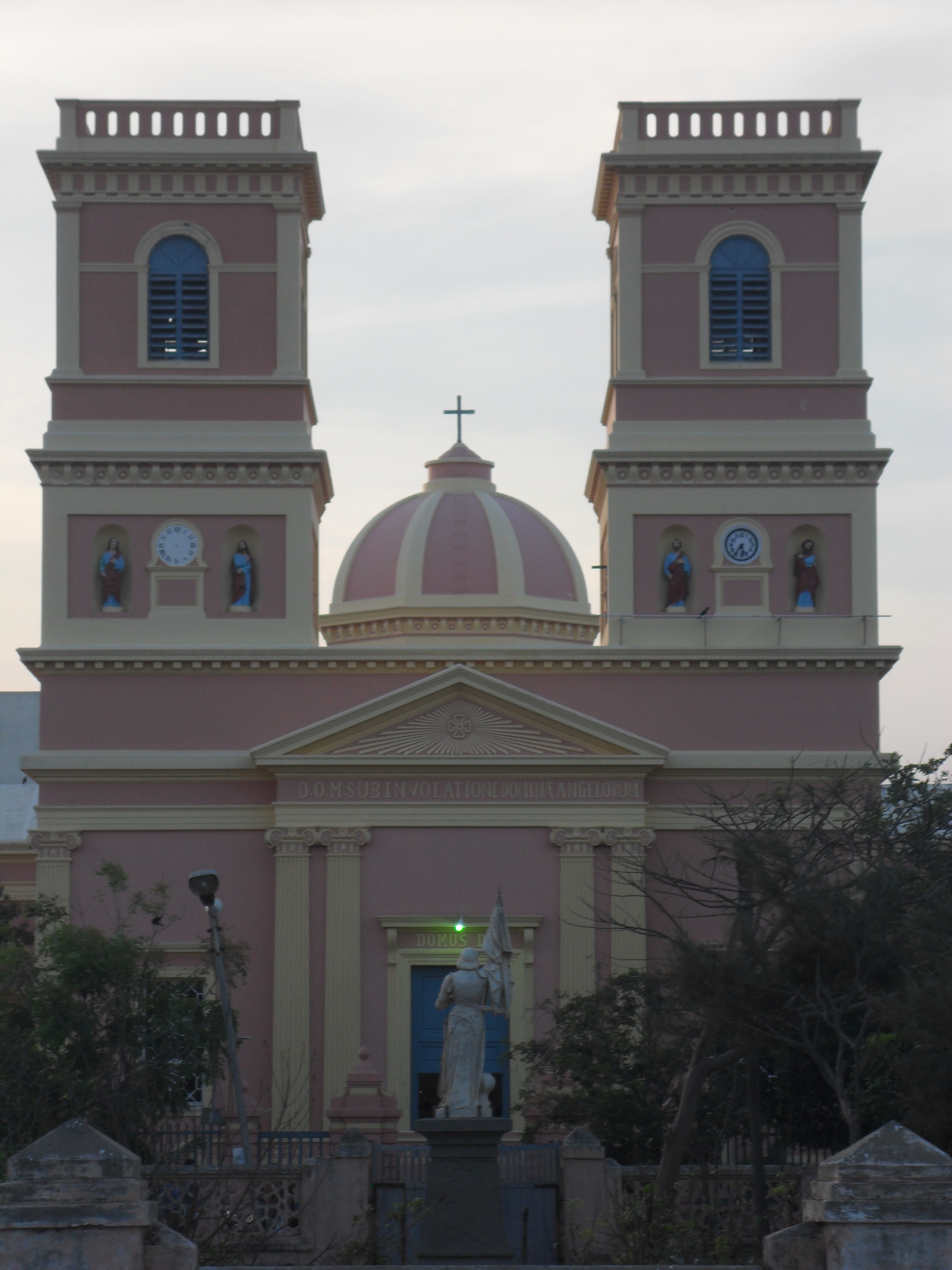
The Eglise de Notre Dame des Anges (The Church of Our Lady of Angels)

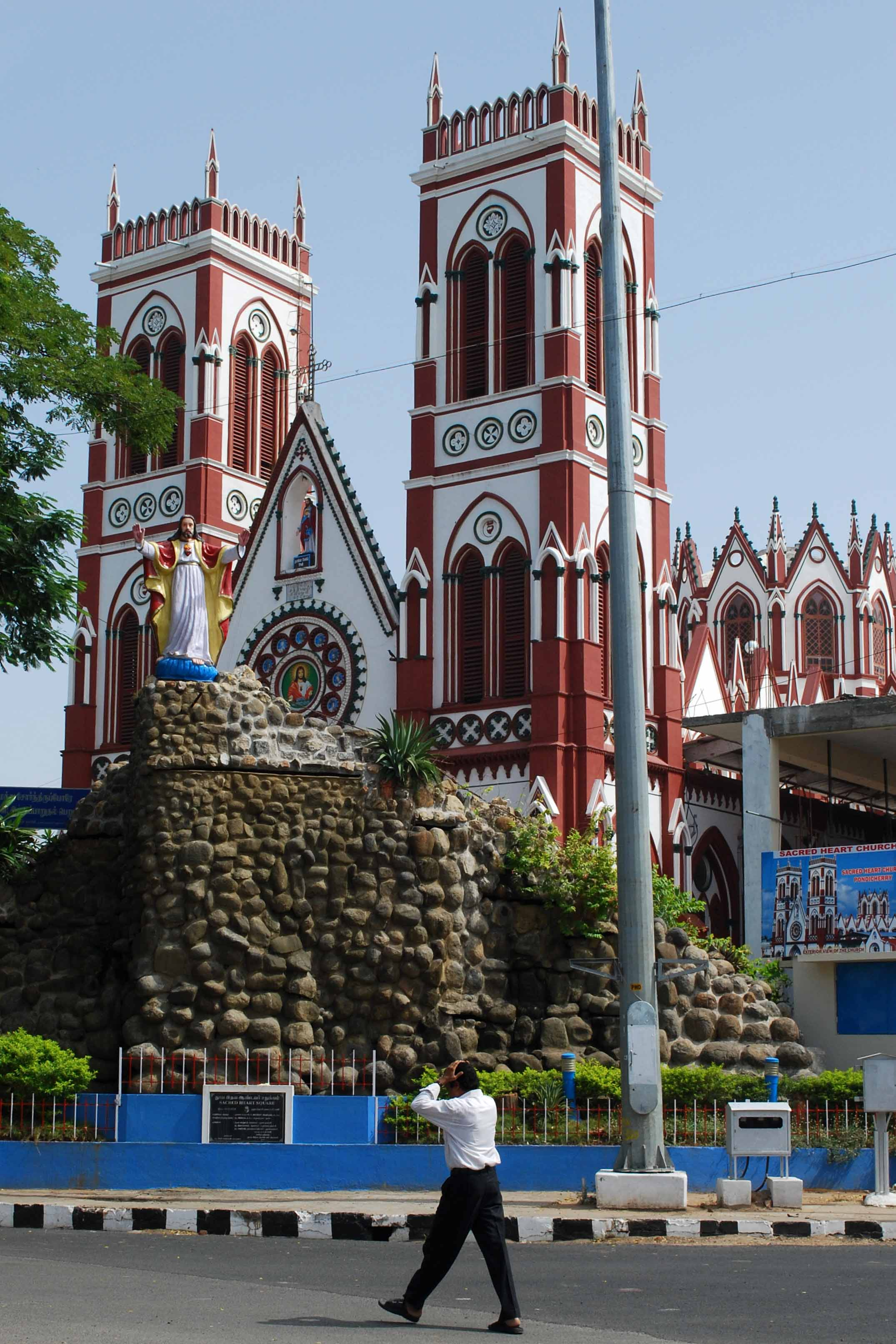
Basilica of the Sacred Heart of Jesus

=== Mosques ===
Meeran mosque is the oldest mosque in Pondicherry, built over 350 years ago. It has the old gothic Islamic architecture in it. It was built by Arcot nawab. It has four lofty pillars below its dome, with Meerhath near it and Meember next to it. It also has the Kalima slab above the Meerhath, with clean blankets spread all over the hall. There is a bronze Kallasas in the top of the façade minaret and the graves of Meeran who built this mosque and Suubhi Errai Perrar Mullah's in it. The mosque hold prayer sessions every day.

Kuthbha (meaning preaching) mosque is the first mosque in Pondicherry. It is said that during the 17th century, as the mosque was in the white area, the French ordered it and the Islamic neighbourhood shifted to the southern end of the town. These streets were built facing Mecca. It has the daarga of Moulla Saiubum. This mosque has daily preaching and prayers with special prayers on Fridays. This is mostly frequented by Tamil speaking Muslims.

Kuthba Mosque was built as Mulla Mohammad Mosque. This mosque has a small pond with fishes, clean hall, and Ramjan fasting food cooking hall and Jenesha in it.

Next to Kuthba Mosque is Muhamadia Mosque. This is older than the Kuthba Mosque and frequented by Urdu speaking Muslims. This has a big praying hall, a small pond with fishes for doing ouzu, place for opening ramzan fasting, a big garden with coconut trees on the backside and a building extension to house the preacher and for administrative works. This mosque has daily preaching and prayers with special prayers on Fridays. The Maulah Sahib Dargha is in between the two mosques.

== See also ==
- Puducherry
- Pondicherry (city)
- Promenade Beach
- Tourism in India

== Outline of tourism in India ==
- List of World Heritage Sites in India
- List of national parks of India
- List of lakes of India
- List of waterfalls in India
- List of State Protected Monuments in India
- List of beaches in India
- Incredible India
- List of Geographical Indications in India
- Medical tourism in India
- List of botanical gardens in India
- List of hill stations in India
- List of gates in India
- List of zoos in India
- List of protected areas of India
- List of aquaria in India
- List of forts in India
- List of forests in India
- Buddhist pilgrimage sites in India
- Hindu pilgrimage sites in India
- List of rock-cut temples in India
- Wildlife sanctuaries of India
- List of rivers of India
- List of mountains in India
- List of ecoregions in India
- Coral reefs in India
- List of stadiums in India
