= Promenade Beach =

Beach in Puducherry, India

Coordinates: 11°55′57″N 79°50′9″E

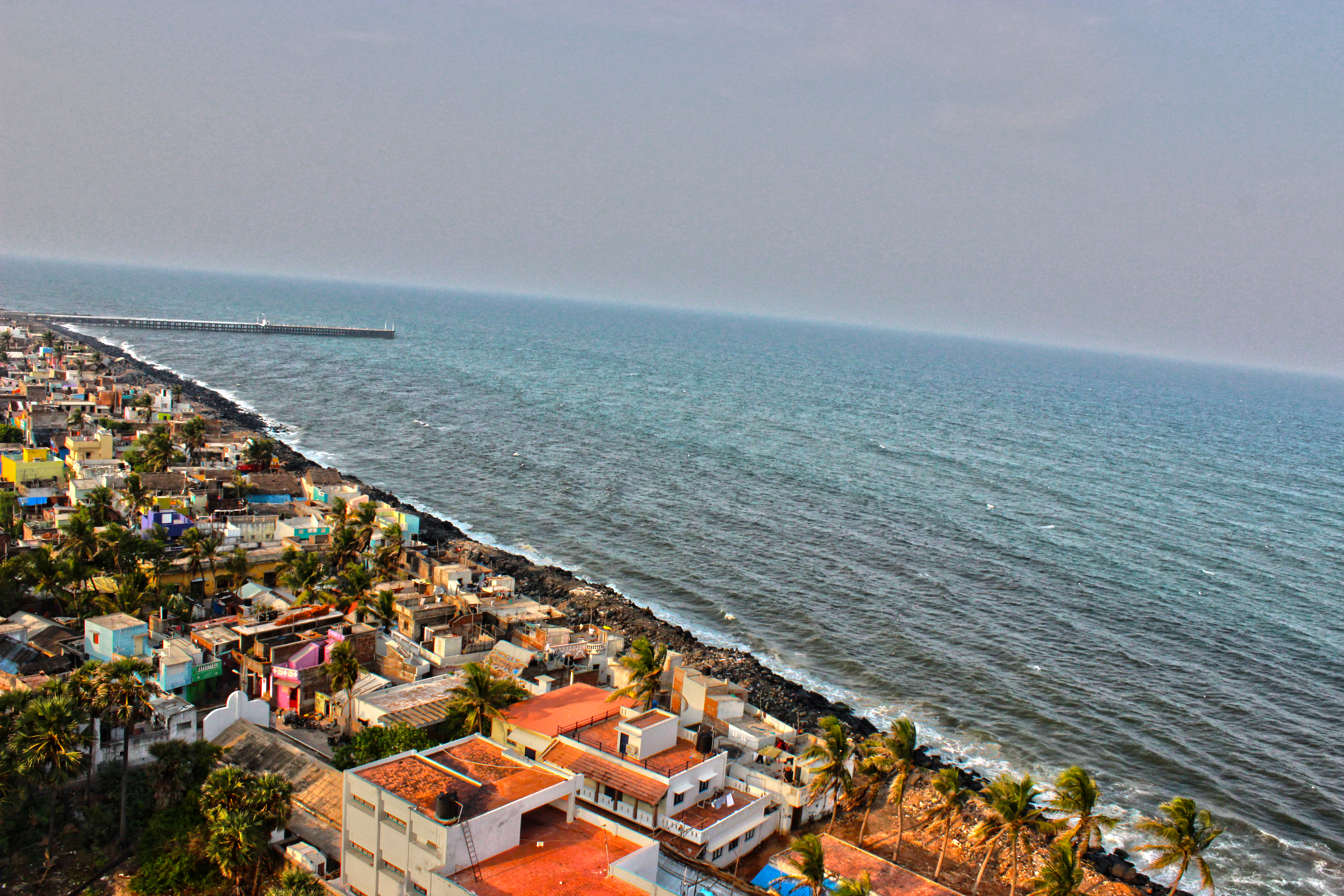
Promenade beach view from the light house

Rock Beach (or, known as, "Promenade Beach", French: Plage de la Promenade) is the popular stretch of beachfront in the city of Puducherry, India, along the Bay of Bengal. It is a 1.2-kilometre-long stretch in Pondicherry, starts from War Memorial and end at Dupleix Park on the Goubert Avenue.

== Other attractions ==
- War Memorial
- Chief Secretariat
- Mahatma Gandhi statue
- Dupleix Park

== Panoramas ==
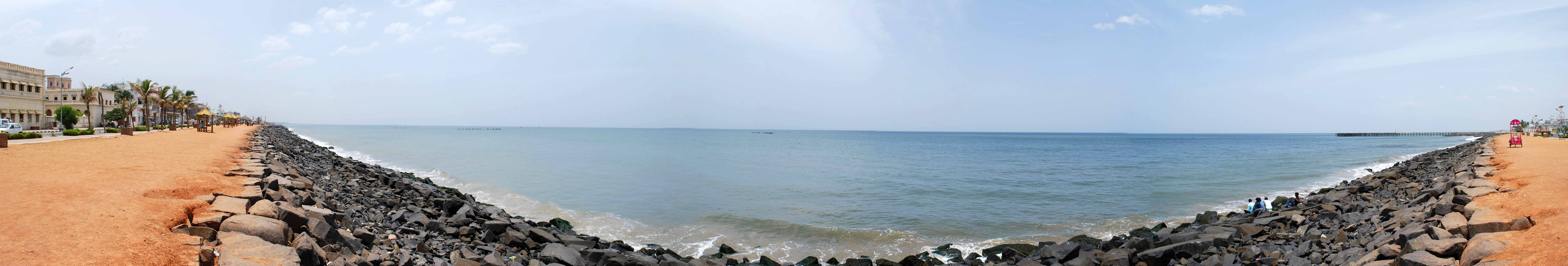
Panoramic view of Pondicherry Beach

== Gallery ==
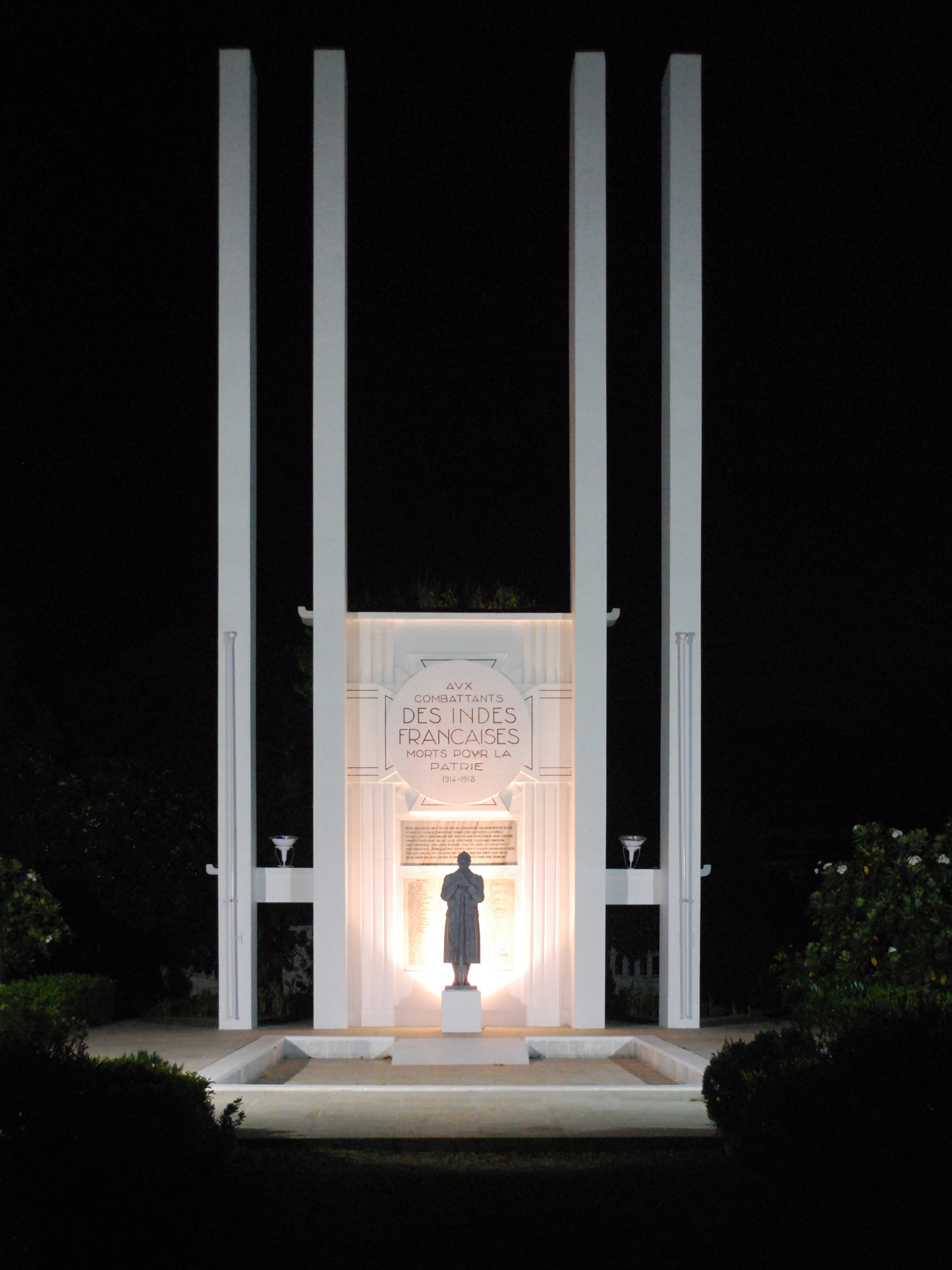
French War Memorial

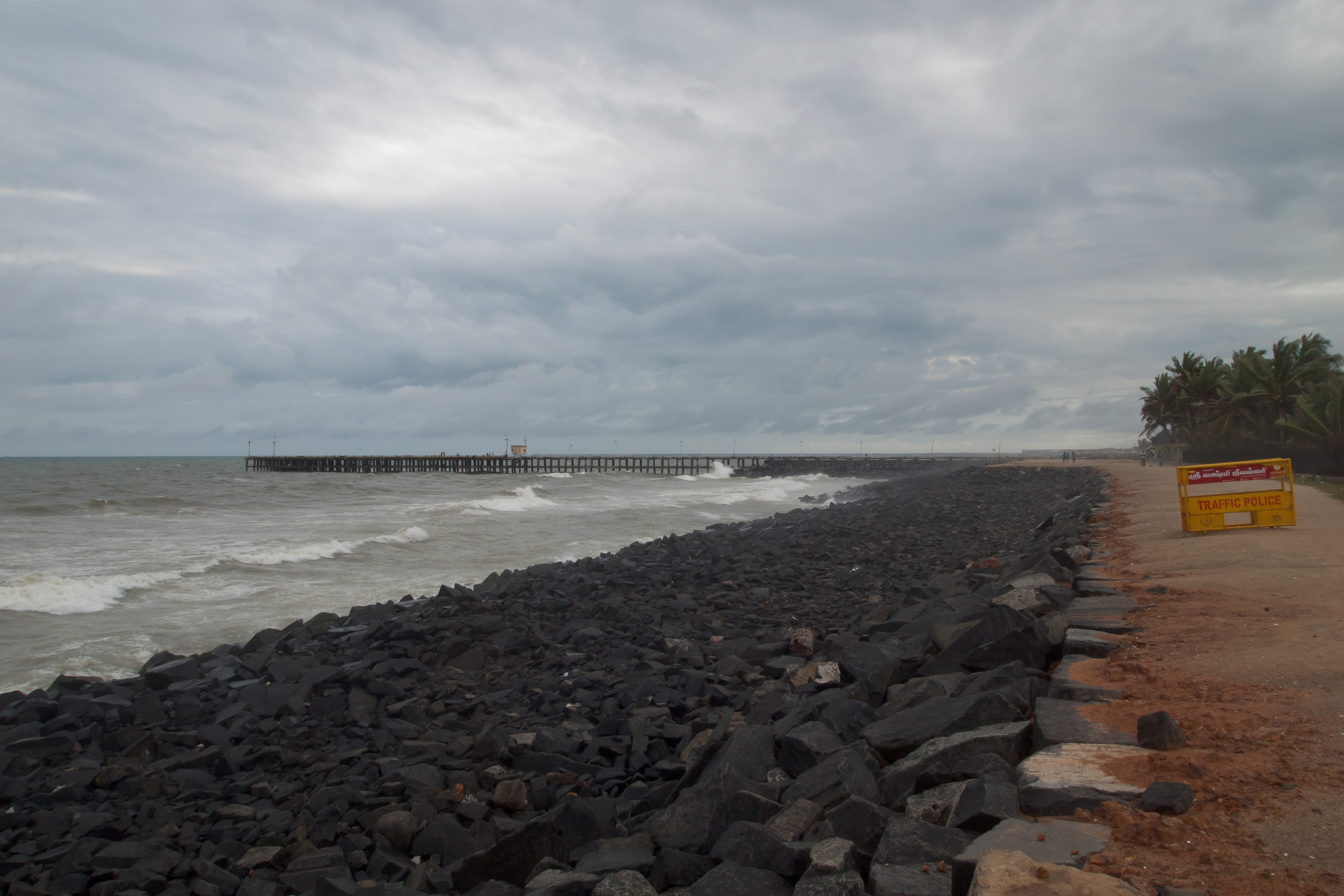
Rock Beach/Promenade Beach

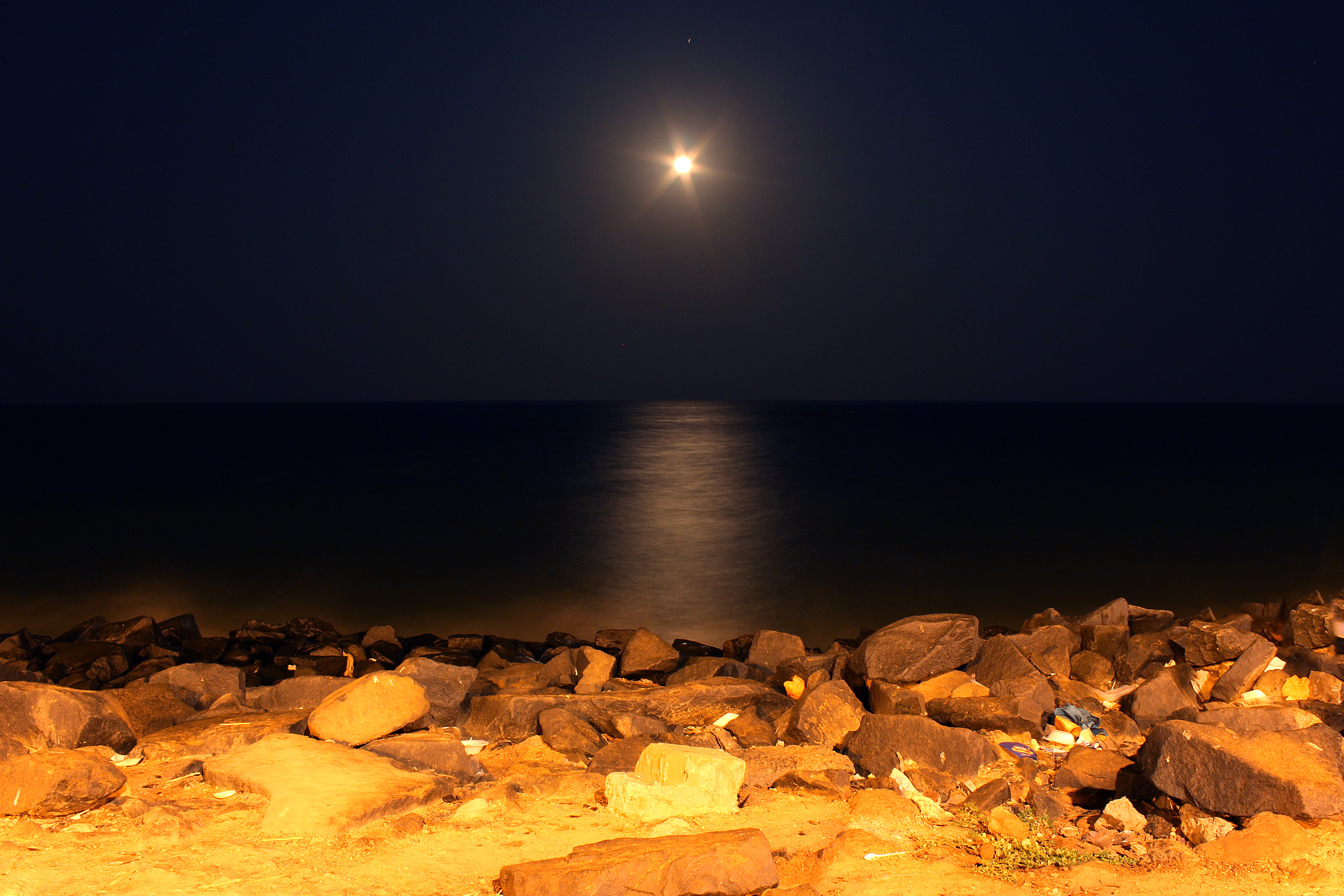
Moon rise at Promenade beach

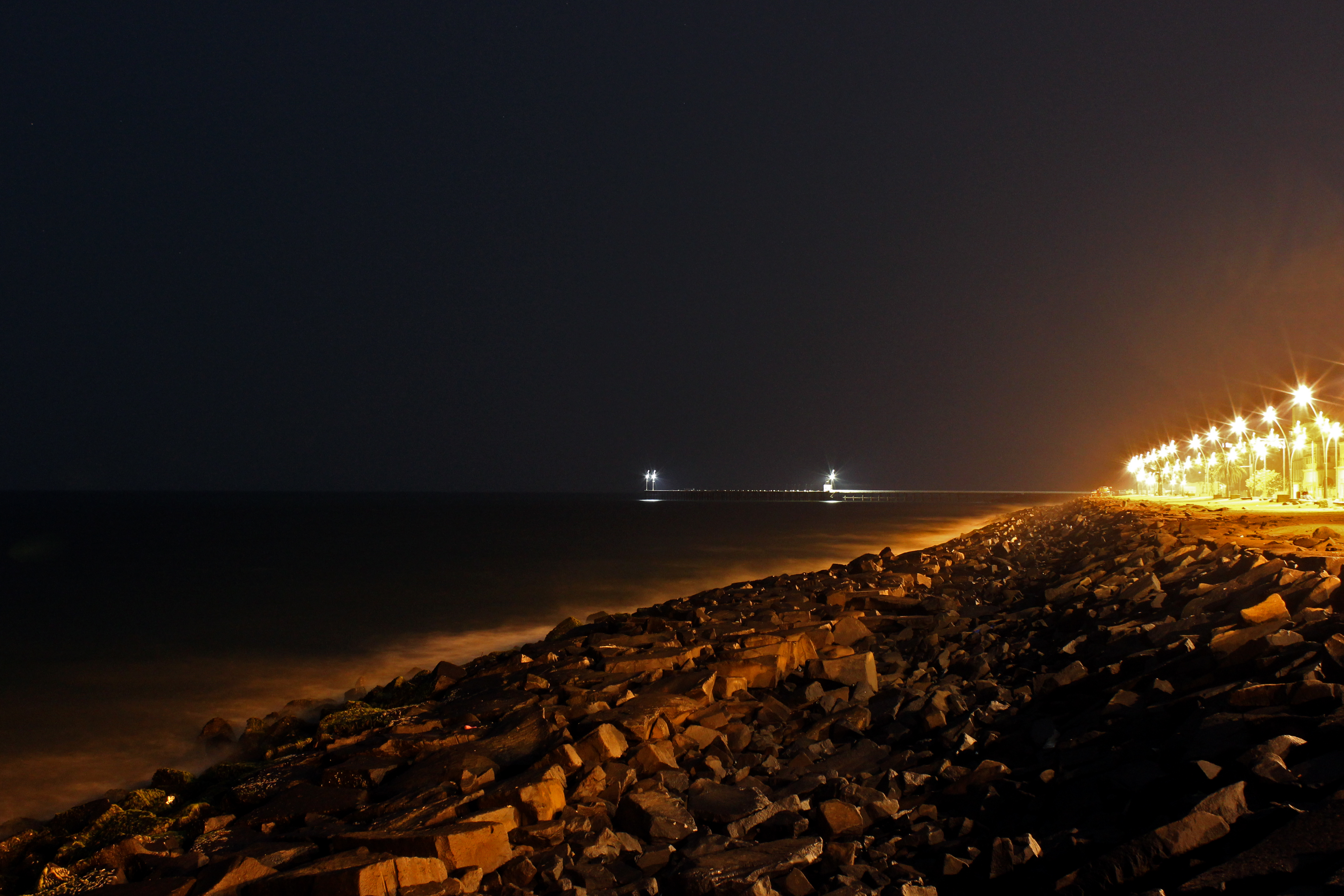
Promenade beach at night showing harbor

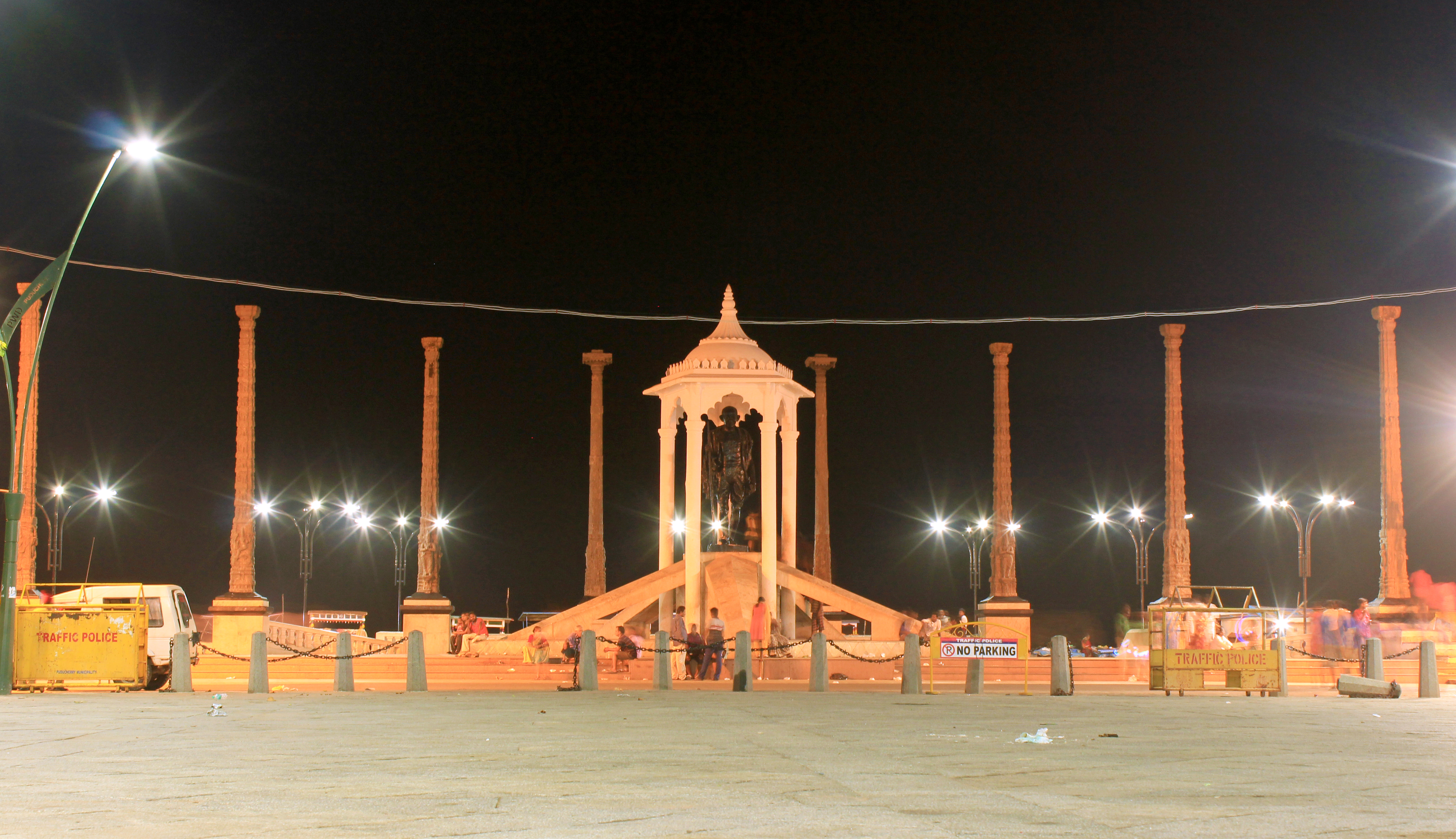
Gandhi statue at Promenade beach

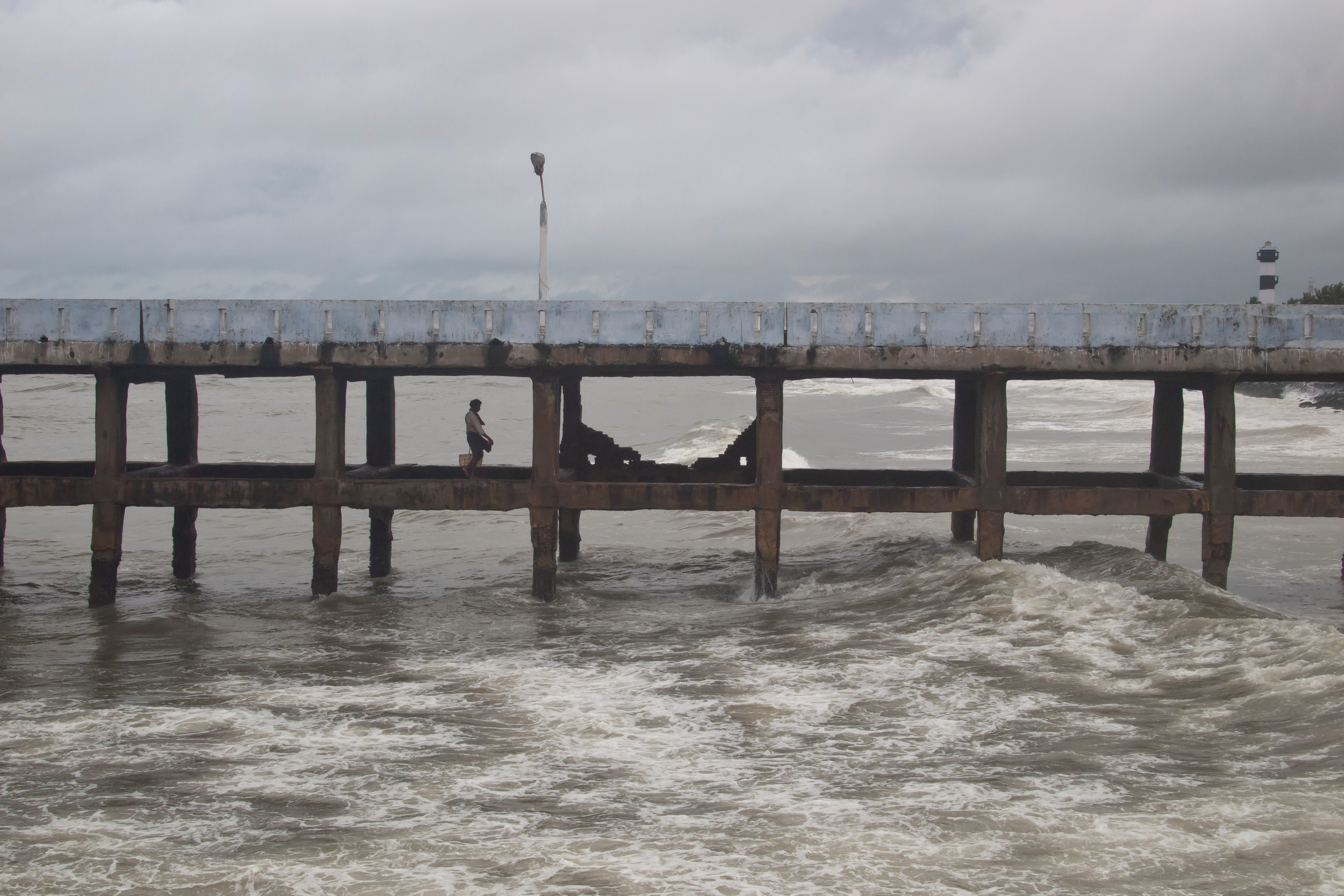
Harbor at Promenade beach

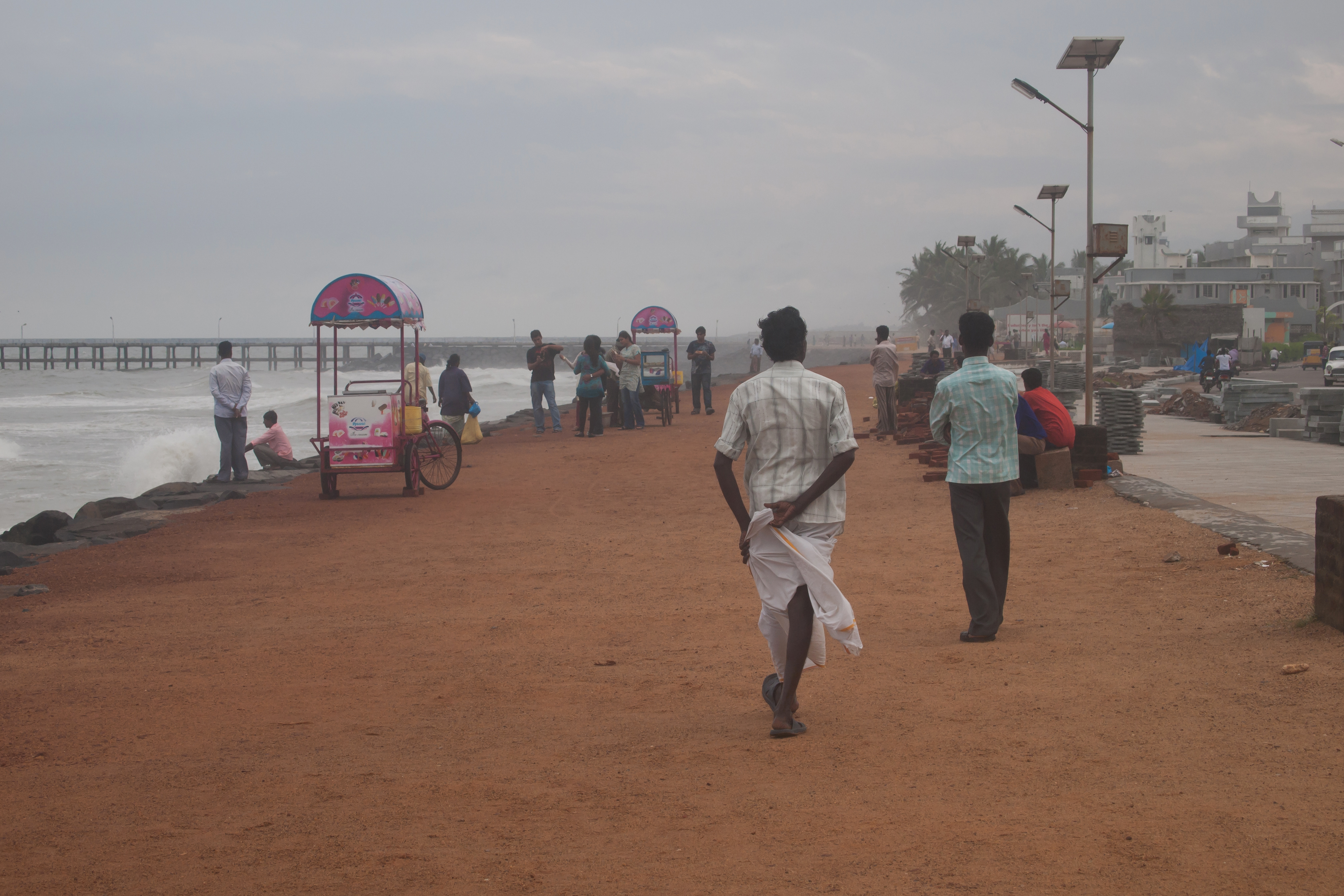
Evening walk by the bay of Bengal in Pondicherry

== See also ==
- Puducherry (union territory)
- Pondicherry (city)
- Tourism in Puducherry
