= Vedapureeswarar Temple, Pondicherry =

Hindu temple in Puducherry, India

Vedapurishvarar Tripurasundari Temple
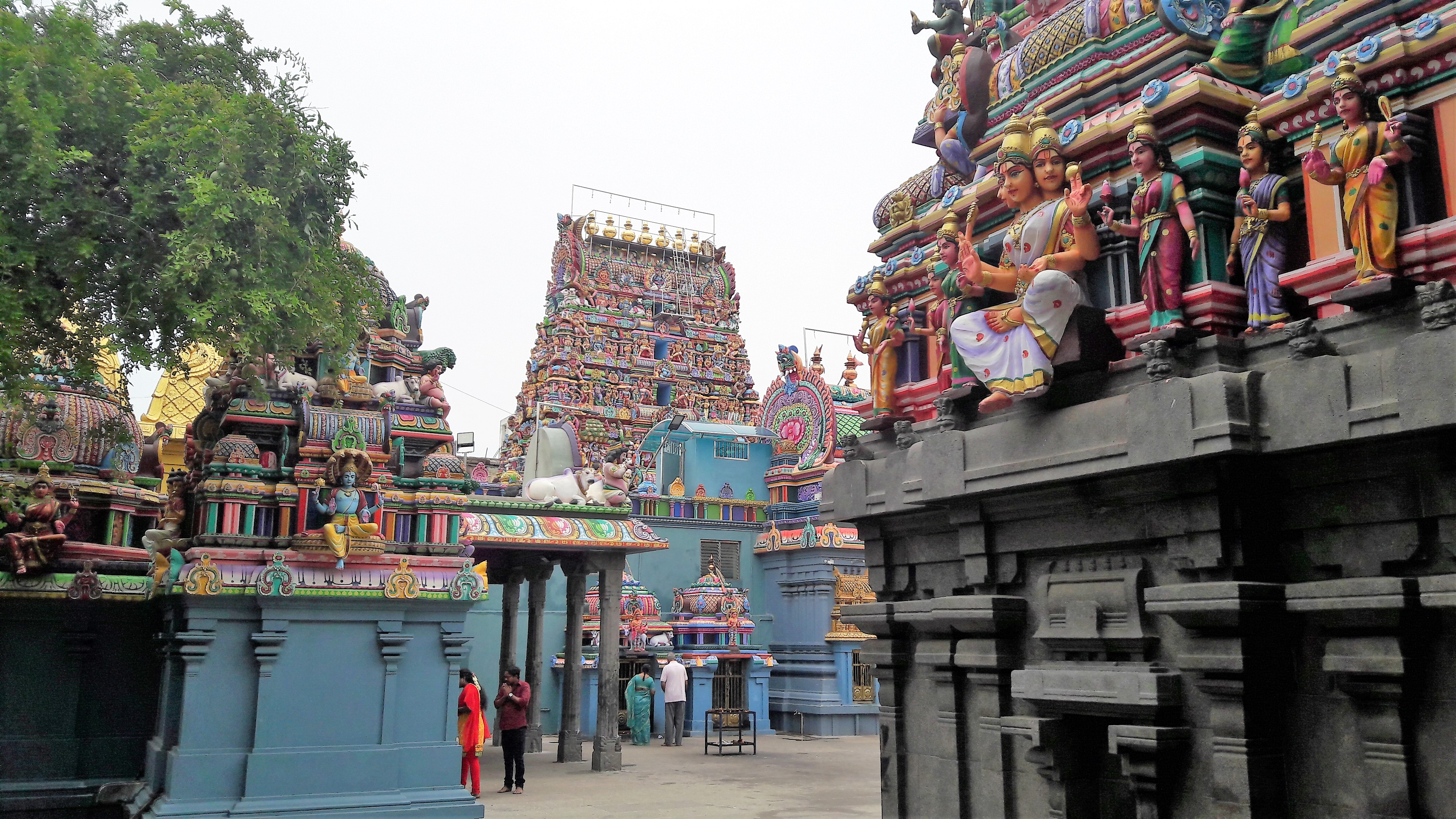
- Vedapurishvarar Tripurasundari Temple, Puducherry

- Location in Puducherry

Religion
- Affiliation: Hinduism
- District: Puducherry
- Deity: Vedapurishvarar (Shiva) Tripurasundari (Parvati)
- Festivals: Brahmotsavam, Annabhishekam, Maha Shivaratri

Location
- Location: Puducherry
- State: Puducherry
- Country: India
- Coordinates: 11°56′23.482″N 79°49′47.213″E

Architecture
- Type: Dravidian architecture

Vedapurishvarar Tripurasundari Temple in Puducherry, is dedicated to the Hindu god Shiva and Hindu goddess Parvati. Constructed in the Dravidian style of architecture, the temple is destroyed by French troops and Indian subcontinental peoples in religious riots between Hindus and Christians in 1748 CE. Shiva is worshipped as Vedapurishvarar and Parvati is worshipped as Tripurasundari.

A granite wall surrounds the temple, enclosing all its shrines. The temple has a five-tiered rajagopuram, the gateway tower. A Divan named Divan Kandappa Mudaliar expanded the temple with the help of public contributions in 1788 CE.

== History ==
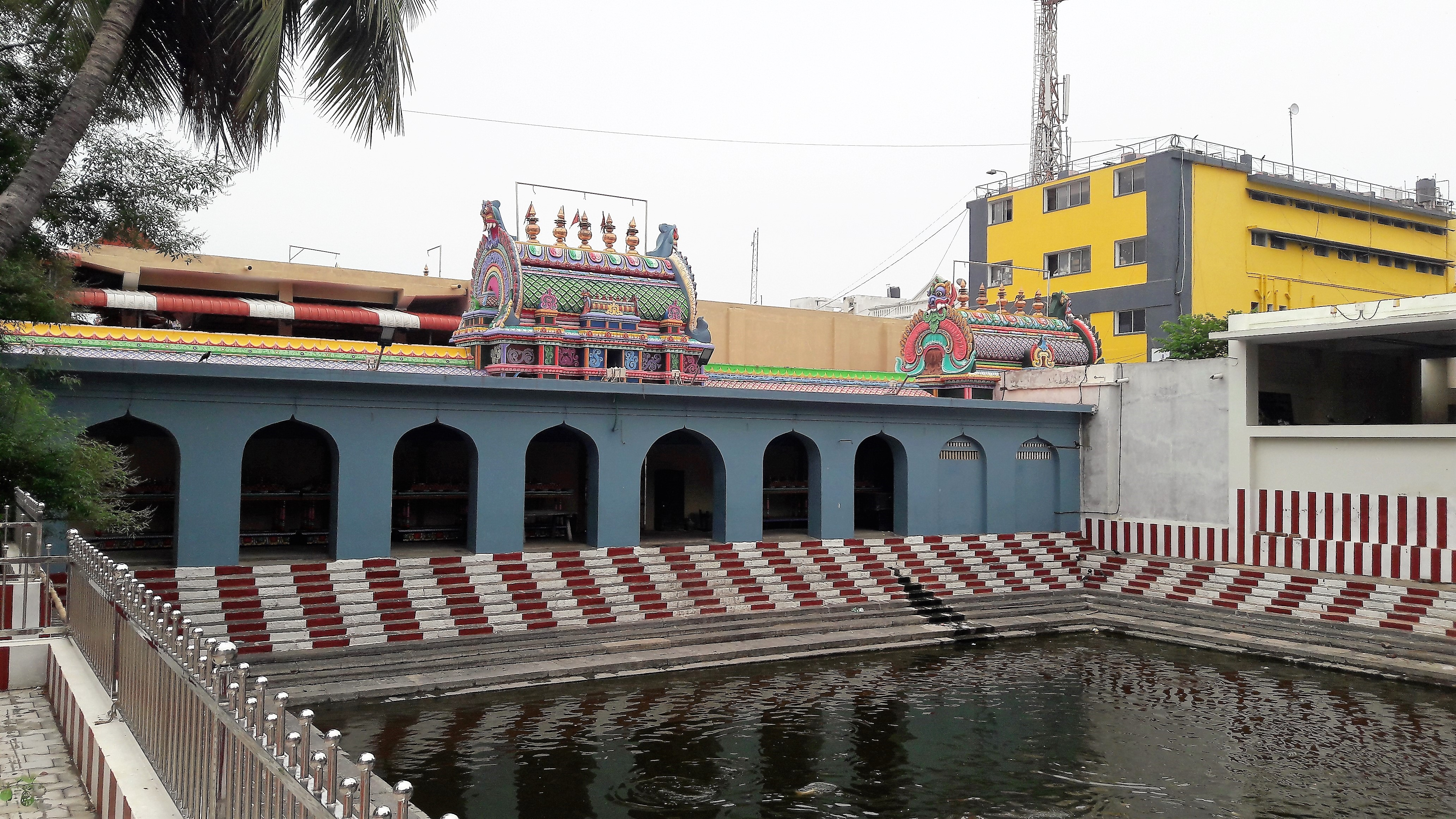
Image of the temple tank

François Martin, the first Governor-general of French India, founded Puducherry, the future capital of French India, in 1674 CE. The Varadharaja Perundevi Temple housed the images of the Vedapurishvarar Tripurasundari Temple during its destruction and reconstruction by the French troops and Indian subcontinental peoples in religious riots between Hindus and Christians in 1748 CE. The temple was totally destroyed by the French troops and Indian subcontinental peoples in religious riots between Hindus and Christians. Divan Kandappa Mudaliar, with the help of public contributions, reconstructed the temple in 1788 CE. The details of the demolition has been recorded in the diary of a chronicler of the period named Ananda Ranga Pillai. The presiding deities in the temple are known to have been migrated from the Samba Ishvaran Ishvari Street to the temple during the later part of the 19th century CE. The temple is maintained and administered by Sri Vedapurishvarar Tripurasundari Devastanams Trust under the Department of Hindu religious institutions of the Government of Puducherry.

== Architecture ==
This temple has a seven-tiered rajagopuram, the gateway tower raising to a height of 75 ft (23 m). The presiding god Vedapurishvarar is in the form of a Lingam is housed in his sanctum sanctorum. The sanctum sanctorum of him is approached from the main entrance through the flag staff hall, Mahamandapa and Arthamandapa. The flag staff is located in the flagstaff hall axial to his sanctum sanctorum. A statue of Nandi faces his shrine in the Mahamandapa. There are shrines of Ganesha and Kartikeya before the Mahamandapa and his sanctum sanctorum is guarded by two Dvarapalas. The presiding goddess Tripurasundari is in the form of a Yoni is housed in her sanctum sanctorum. There also shrines of Shani, Durga, Chandeshvara, Dakshinamurti, Navagraha around the two sanctum sanctorums. The rectangular temple tank is located inside the temple and has 35 steps to the basement.
