= Varadharaja Perumal Temple, Puducherry =

Hindu temple in Puducherry, India

Varadharaja Perumal Perundevi Thayar Temple
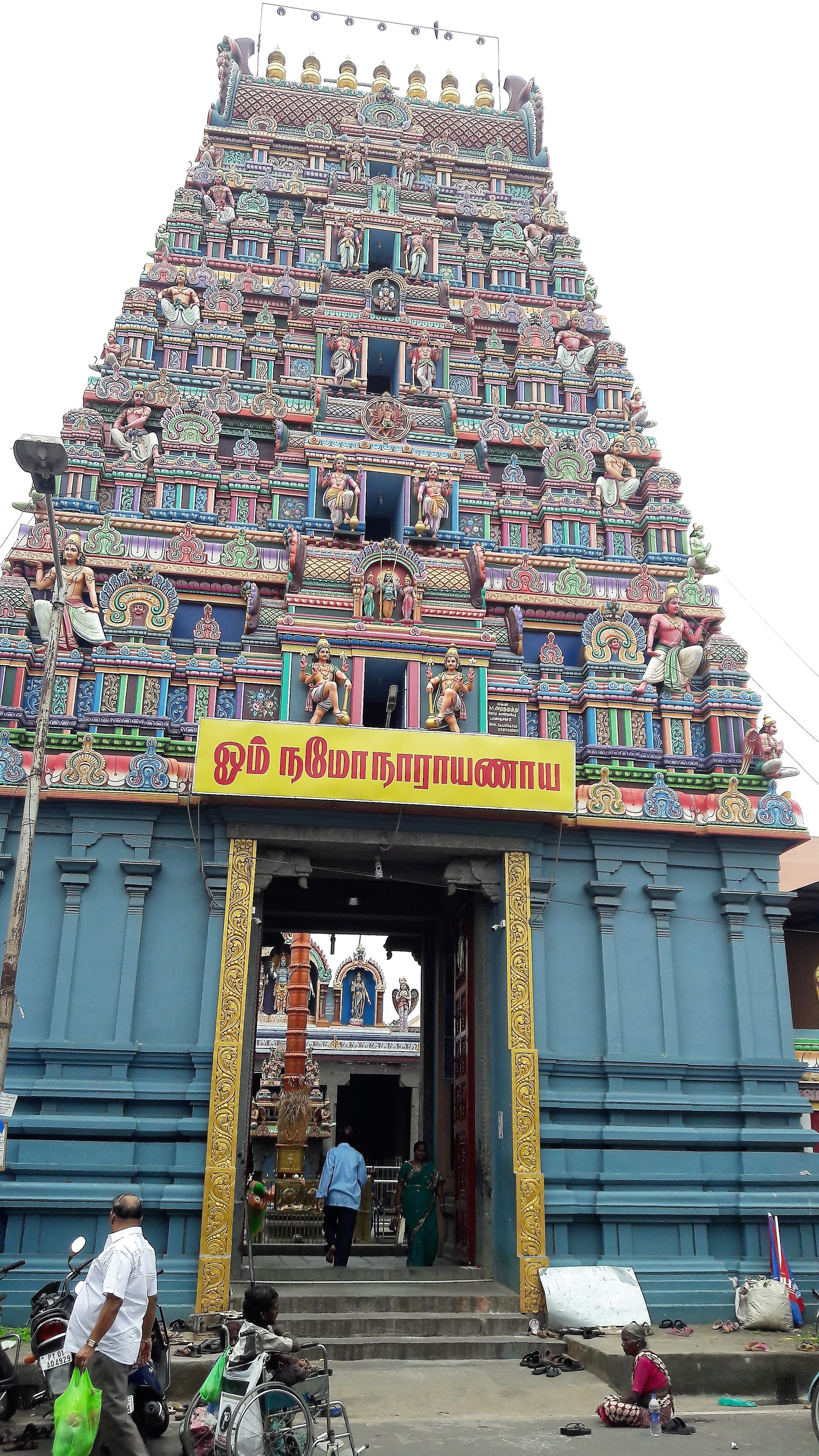

- Location in Puducherry

Religion
- Affiliation: Hinduism
- District: Puducherry
- Deity: Varadharaja Perumal (Vishnu) Perundevi Thayar (Lakshmi)

Location
- Location: Puducherry
- State: Puducherry
- Country: India
- Coordinates: 11°56′27″N 79°49′48″E

Architecture
- Type: Dravidian architecture

Varadaraja Perumal Perundevi Thayar Temple in Puducherry, is dedicated to the Hindu god Vishnu and Hindu goddess Lakshmi. It is located heritage town region of the city. Constructed in the Dravidian style of architecture, the temple is a storehouse of Chola and Pandya architecture.

A granite wall surrounds the temple, enclosing all its shrines. The temple has a five-tiered rajagopuram, the temple's gateway tower. The temple is originally believed to have been built by Cholas during the 11th century CE, with later expansion by Pandyas during the 12th century CE.

The temple follows Vaishnavite and Shaktite traditions of worship. Four daily rituals and three yearly festivals are held at the temple, of which the ten-day annual Brahmostavam during the Tamil month of Chithrai (April - May) and five-day Pavitrotsavam during Avani (August - September) and 25-day Rama and Sita's marriage festival during Chithrai are the most prominent. The temple is maintained and administered by the Archaeological Survey of India as a religious monument.

== History ==
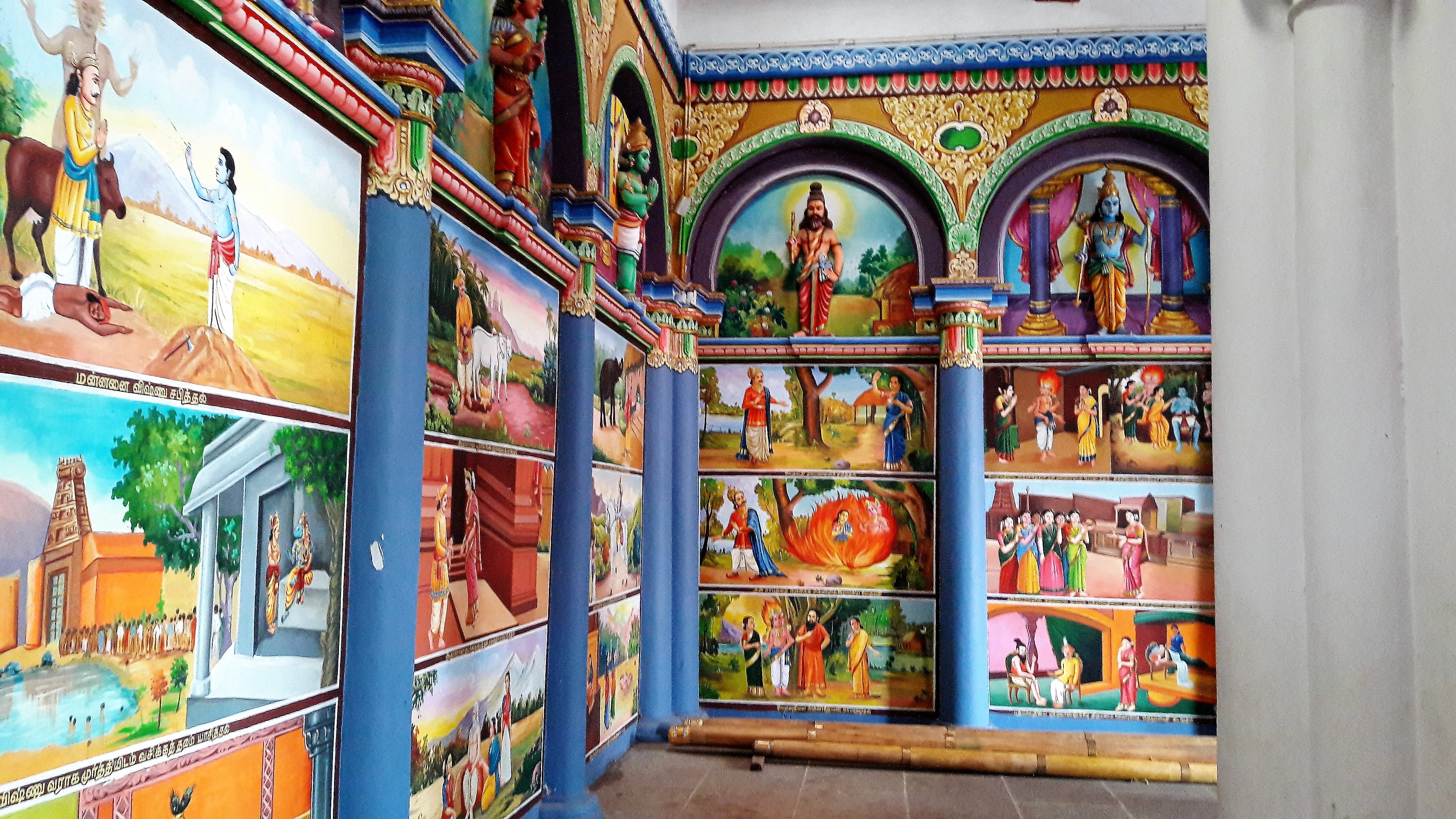
The story of Tirupati Venkateshvara Padmavati Temple, Tirupati inside the temple.

The temple is originally built by the Cholas from the 11th century CE and subsequently by the Pandyas from the 12th century CE. The regions are destroyed and reconstructed the British Colonial Empire and French Colonial Empire and Indian Subcontinental wars during the 17th century CE. All temples in the area are destroyed and reconstructed during the French and British and Indian Subcontinental wars. The temple housed the images of the Vedapurishvarar Tripurasundari Temple during its destruction and reconstruction by the French and Indian Subcontinental Hindu and Christian religious riots during 1748 CE. The images of Rama, Sita, Hanuman, Navanithakrishna, Santhanakrishna and Venugopalan were dug out from Vaithikupam, Puducherry near Muthialpet, Puducherry in 1902 CE and subsequently housed in the temple. It is known that Vasanthamandapa was built by Hindus, Muslims, Christians of the city of Puducherry.

== Architecture ==
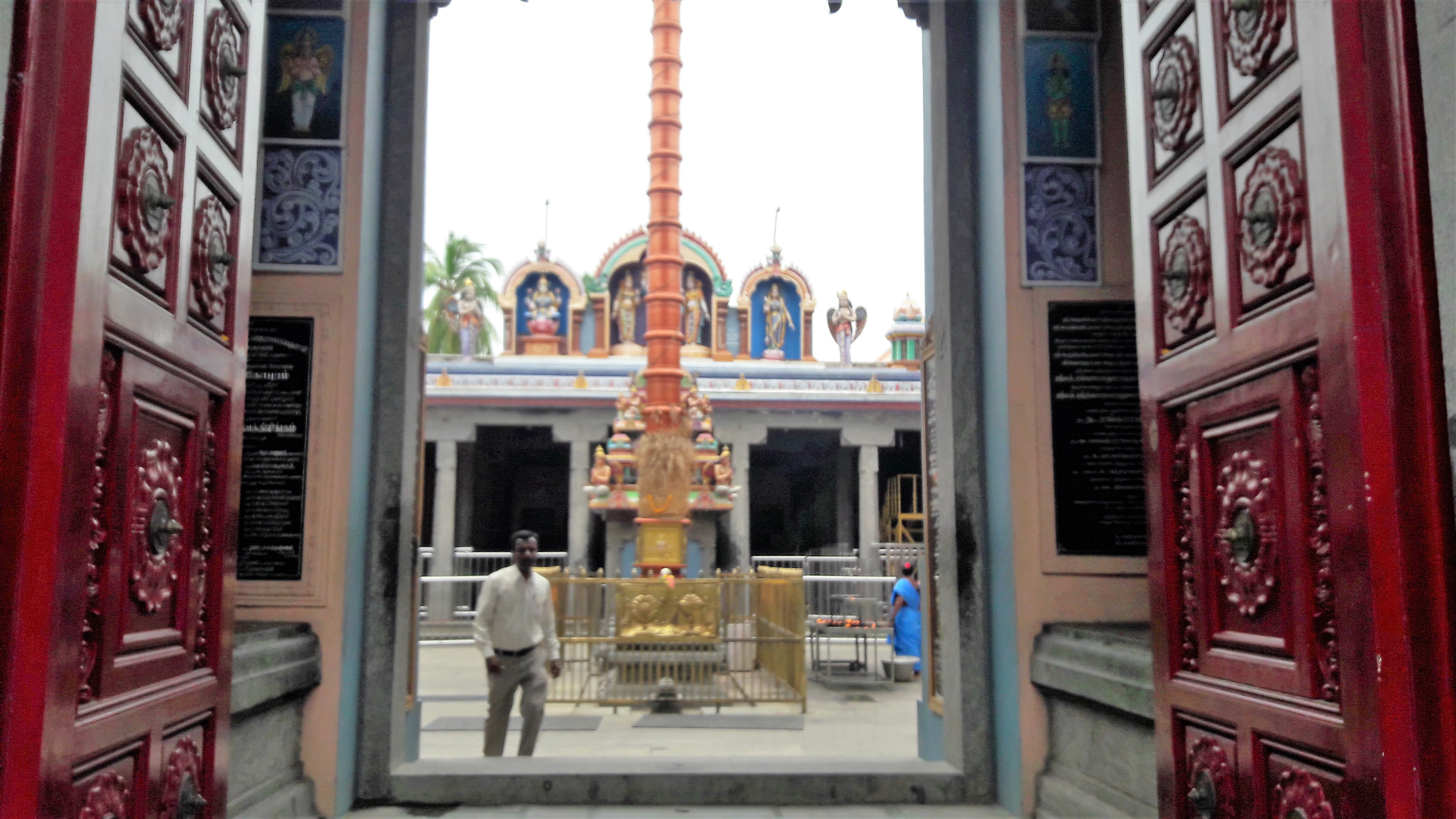
The Entrance of the temple.

The five-tiered rajagopuram, the temple's gateway tower, is 110 ft (34 m) tall. The sanctum houses the image of Varadharaja in standing posture 5 ft (1.5 m) is made of granite sporting four arms. Two of his arms hold Panchajanya and Sudharshana Chakra, while the other two have Abayamudra and Kadahasta. The images of Perundevi and Bhumi are located on either of his sides, which also has the festive image. The Ardhamandapa is guarded by two Dvarapalas on either sides. There is a separate shrine of Perundevi, which also houses the festival image. There is a mirror hall in the temple adjacent to the sanctum. There are paintings done in modern days around the walls of the precinct showing the 108 Divya Desams. There are separate shrines for Vaishnava Gurus like Vedanta Desika and Manavala Mamunigal. The temple has 83 springs in the temple tanks and 12 bodies of water. The water in the temple tank is considered to be medicinal and devotees take a dip to cure themselves of common ailments.

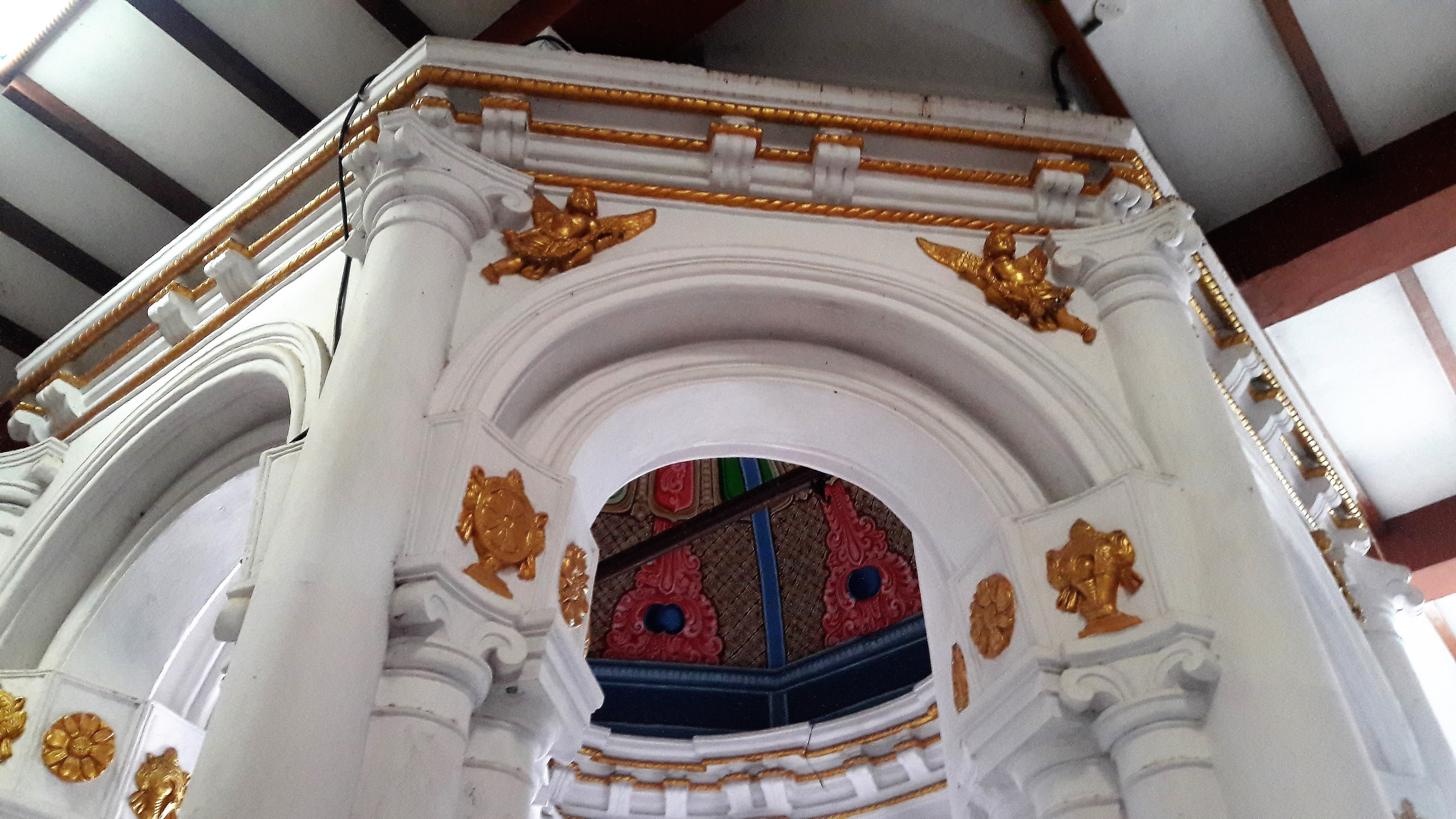
The ceiling of the Temple.

Annaprashana, a practise of making the children write their first alphabet in a plate of rice, is a ritual practised in the temple by devotees. The temple is maintained and administered by the Government of Puducherry.
