= French War Memorial (Puducherry) =

First World War Memorial for dead French Indian residents

World War I Memorial
- France
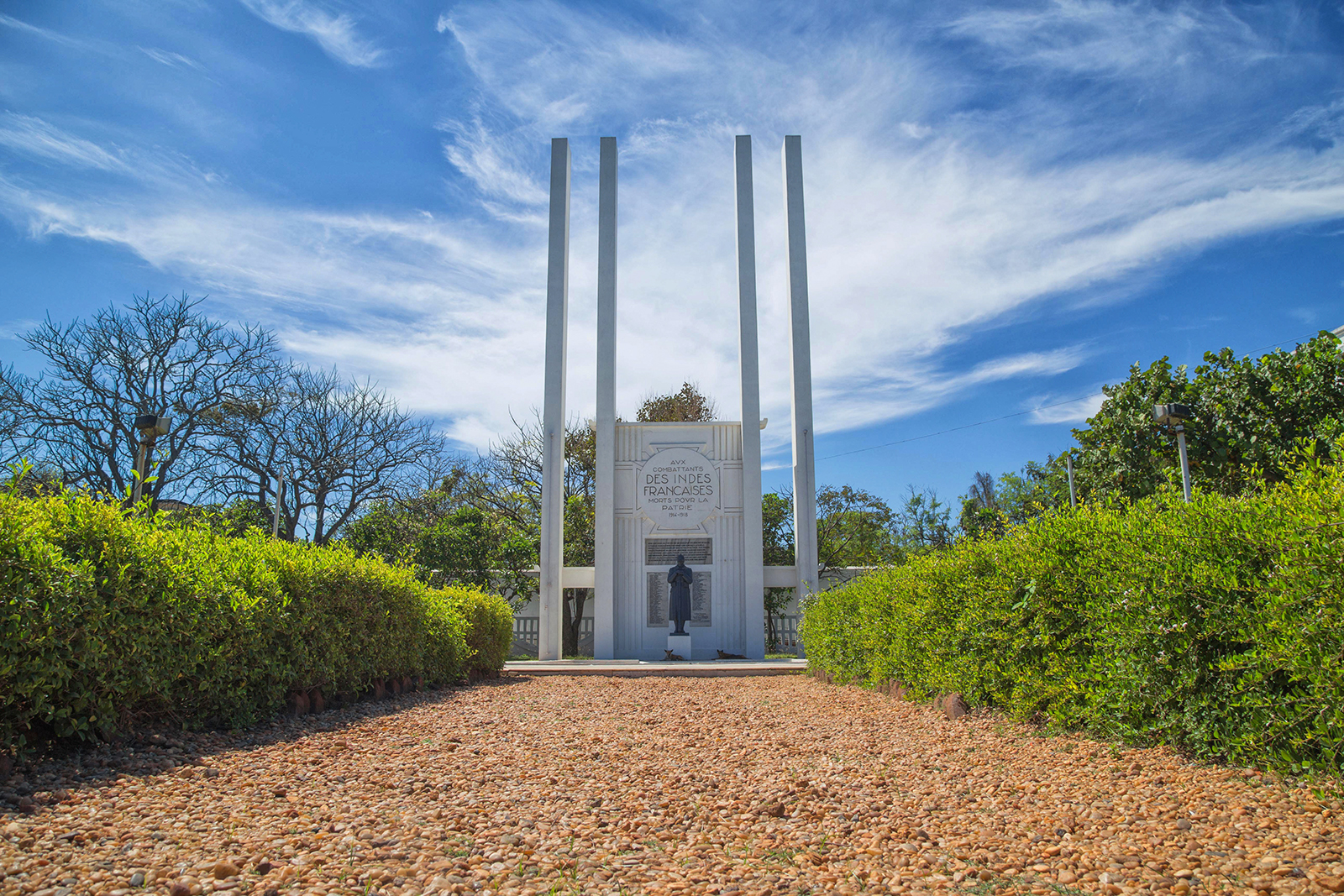
- View of the memorial
- For residents of French India who died for the country during World War I
- Established: 1937
- Unveiled: 3 April 1938
- Location: 11°55′55″N 79°50′07″E; Goubert Avenue, Puducherry, India

The French War Memorial in Puducherry, India (French: Monument aux Combattants des Indes Françaises morts pour la Patrie) is a war memorial dedicated to residents of French India who died for the country during the First World War. It is on Goubert Avenue in Puducherry, located opposite to the Gandhi statue.

== Background ==
France had decided in 1915 to reinforce her army with recruits from her Asian possessions; a recruitment campaign was launched in December 1915.

"India is indebted to France in different ways, it is now the duty of every Indian to stand with France during this period of adversity (...) France will never forget those who have come to her during these difficult times. They will be treated like her own children. Thank you for joining the French army." – from a communique during this period by Alfred Martineau, the governor of French India.

Pondicherry would offer 800 recruits, send 500 combatants overseas and would see 75 deaths from this group.

== History ==
The monument was erected in 1937 and inaugurated on 3 April 1938 by governor Crocicchia.A subsidy of 5,000 rupees was entered into the colonial budget and was granted "to the committee designated by the decree of 14 January 1936, for the erection of a monument to the memory of the inhabitants of French India who died for France during the 1914–1918 war." It was designed by the sculptor Gaston Petit and an architect named Delafon.

A bronze plaque lists the names of soldiers who died during the First World War. Further plaques were added, listing the names of soldiers who died during World War II, the French War in Indochina and the Algerian War. The monument remains the property of France.

The memorial is decorated and illuminated yearly on Bastille Day (14 July) in honour of the soldiers from the colony who took part in World War I. French government officials visit the memorial on occasion and lay flowers at the foot of the monument. A "Defense and Citizenship Day" is held every November, offering students from the Lycée français de Pondichéry and other local schools the chance to attend presentations on the rights and duties of French citizen followed by presentations on national defense. They then attend a ceremony at the memorial on 11 November to honour the end of the First World War.
