= Institut français en Inde =

French cultural centre in India

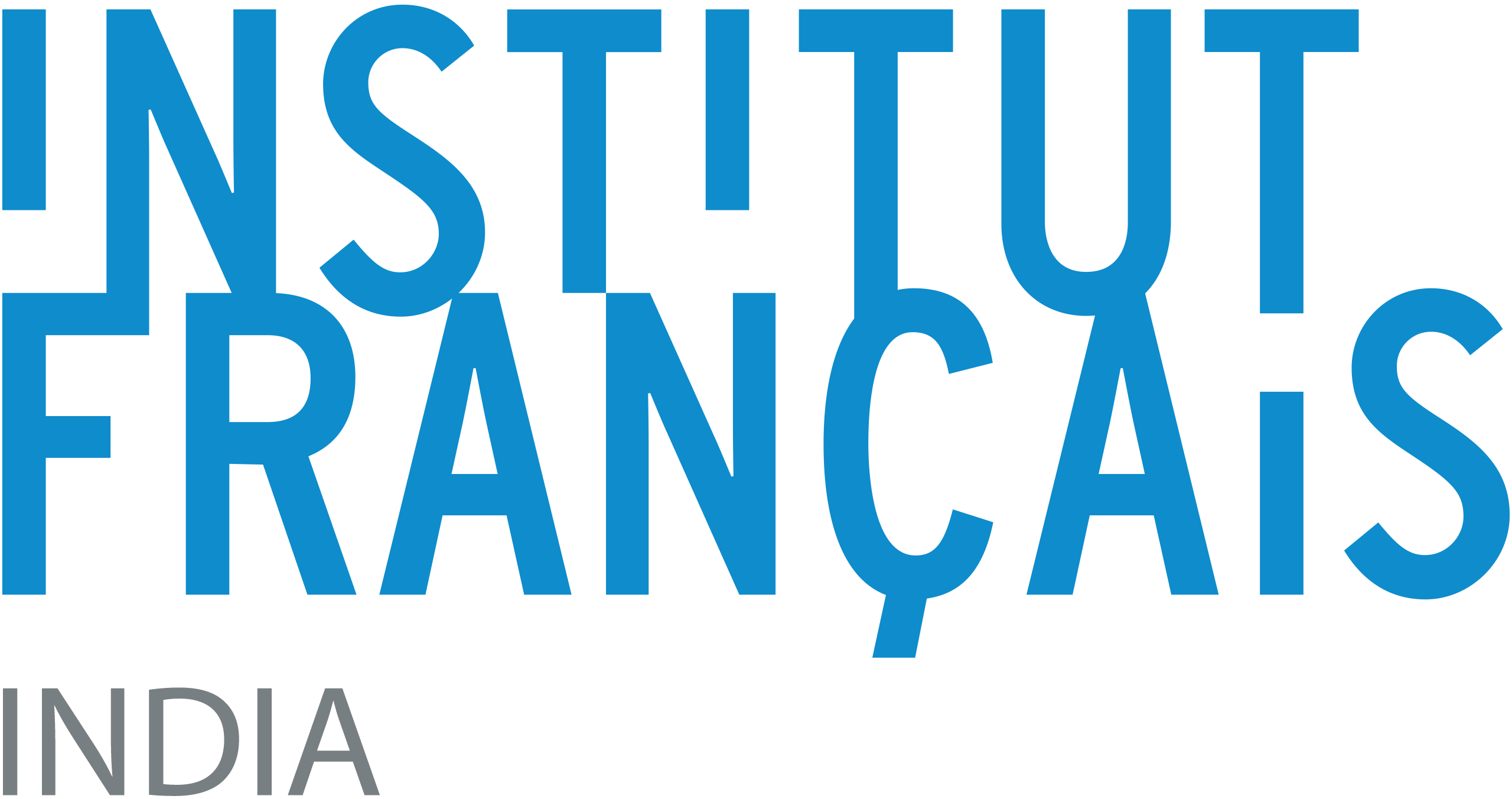
- Type: Cultural and Cooperation Service of French Embassy in India
- Location(s): 2, Dr Abdul Kalam Road; 110011 New Delhi, India
- Website: http://www.institutfrancaisindia.in

The Institut français en Inde (IFI), also knows as the French Institute in India, is the service of the Embassy of France in India responsible for implementing French cultural, educational, and scientific diplomacy in India. It is part of the global network of the Institut français under the French Ministry for Europe and Foreign Affairs.

Headquartered in New Delhi, the IFI acts as the central node for Franco-Indian cooperation, closely working with a vast network in India that includes 15 Alliance Française centers and research centers such as the Institut Français de Pondichéry.

== Background ==
This French Institute was inaugurated on 29 March 2012 by Mr Xavier Darcos, then president of the French Institute alliance. However, French cultural activities in Delhi have existed under various forms before the official opening of the institute. Before 2012, all cultural activities related to the French embassy were supervised by Culturesfrance.

The French Institute entertains close links with the French Embassy in India, New Delhi, the local Alliance Française and other French-teaching establishments like the Lycée Français de Delhi.

The Lycée français de Delhi and the Centre for Social Research and Humanities are also based within its walls. It is located next to the 5 stars hotel 'Taj Mahal', the Parsi cemetery and a few hundred meters from the Rajpath and India Gate

== Mission ==
The institute’s cultural center participates actively to the local and national art scene, by organising dozens of cultural events every year, on a local, regional or national basis. It also participates to external events, within the promotion of friendly ties between France and other francophone countries and India.

It cooperates intimately with Indian universities to propose joint courses to Indian and French students alike. In 2011 alone, 2500 Indian students chose to study in France via the joint programs created by the Institut français.

== See also ==
- France–India relations
- Lycée français de Pondichéry
- French culture
