= France–India relations =

- France: India

Diplomatic mission
- Embassy of France, New Delhi: Embassy of India, Paris

Envoy
- French Ambassador to India Thierry Mathou: Indian Ambassador to France Sanjeev Singla

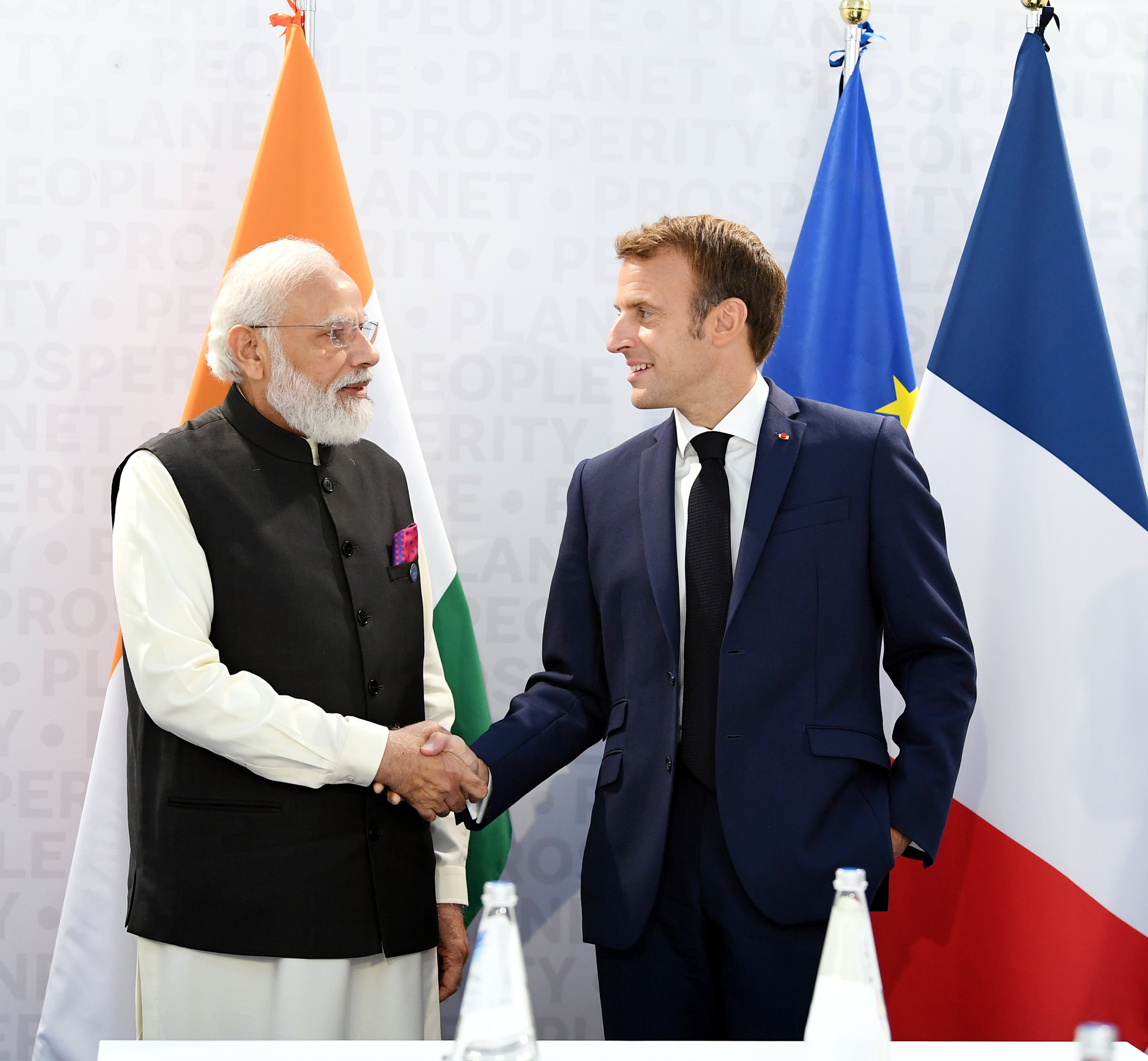
Prime minister of India, Narendra Modi meeting with the President of the French Republic, Emmanuel Macron, on the sidelines of the G-20 Summit, in Rome, Italy on October 30, 2021.

France–India relations or the Franco-Indian relations are the bilateral relations between the French Republic and the Republic of India. The two nations are traditionally characterised by a close and special relationship. In August 2019, a researcher from the Hudson Institute referred to France as "India's new best friend." The trade relations between these two countries date back centuries, with a rich history spanning from the 17th century until 1954 when France maintained a colonial presence in the Indian subcontinent. Puducherry, one of its former Indian territories, remains a popular destination for French tourists visiting India.

Since the establishment of the strategic partnership in 1998, bilateral cooperation between France and India has witnessed notable advancements. There have been frequent high-level exchanges at the head of state/head of government levels, accompanied by an increase in commercial exchanges. These exchanges include strategic areas such as defence, nuclear energy, and space. France became the first country to enter into a nuclear energy agreement with India, following the waiver granted by the International Atomic Energy Agency and the Nuclear Suppliers Group. This enabled India to resume full civil nuclear cooperation with the international community. There even exists a growing and wide-ranging cooperation in areas such as trade and investment, culture, science and technology, and education. France has consistently supported India's goals for a multipolar world, led by regional democracies.

== History ==
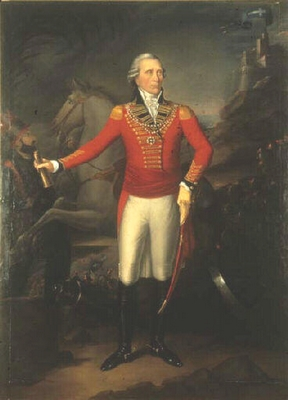
Portrait of Benoît de Boigne during his service of the Maratha Empire.

An Indian Christian priest, Saint Severus, settled in Vienne, France, in the 5th century.

In 1407 CE, Romani people of Indian origin were recorded living in France.

In the 17th century, François Bernier (1625–1688), a French physician and traveler, served as the personal physician of the Mughal emperor Aurangzeb for 12 years.

During the 18th century, France was actively involved in the European colonial powerplay in the Indian Ocean region. French General Dupleix formed alliances with Murzapha Jung in the Deccan and Chanda Sahib in the Carnatic Wars, engaging in conflict against Robert Clive of the East India Company. These relationships were beneficial to the French. The French allies gifted areas such as the Alamparai Fort in return for the services provided by the French against the British East India Company.

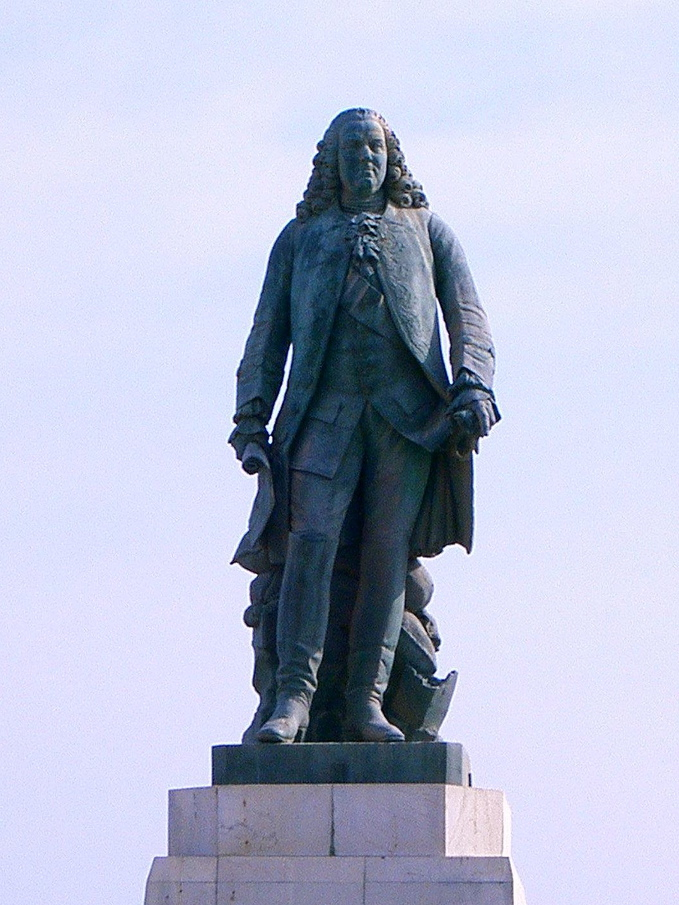
Statue of Dupleix in Pondicherry, India

The French experienced both victories and defeats during this period. They triumphed in the 1746 Battle of Madras, and alongside the Indian forces, overcame Anwaruddin in 1749. However, setbacks occurred with their failure in the Battle of Arcot in 1751, leading to surrender in 1752. In 1758, they achieved success with the capture of Fort St David under Lally, but suffered defeats at Machilipatnam (1759) and Vandavasi (1760).

Meanwhile, the French military adventurer and mercenary, Benoît de Boigne gained renown in India for his service under the Marathas, whom he assisted in numerous battles against the Rajputs.

With the Treaty of Paris in 1763, France lost its prominence in India, although it maintained five trading posts, leaving opportunities for disputes and power-play with the British. France supported the Patriot cause during the American War of Independence in 1776, and wished to expel the British from India.

In 1782, Louis XVI sealed an alliance with the Maratha Peshwa Madhav Rao Narayan, prompting Bussy to move his troops to Ile de France (Mauritius) and later contribute to French efforts in India in 1783. Admiral Suffren allied with Hyder Ali in the Second Anglo-Mysore War against the British East India Company in 1782–1783, engaging in five battles against the Royal Navy on the coasts of India and Ceylon. During this time, Suffren fought the English admiral Sir Edward Hughes and collaborated with the rulers of Mysore. An army of 3,000 French soldiers collaborated with Hyder Ali to capture Cuddalore.

While the British established authority over the Madras Presidency (covering the modern Indian states of Andhra Pradesh and Tamil Nadu), France retained control of Pondicherry, Karikal, Yanam, and Mahé, as well as maintaining a foothold in Chandannagar, now in West Bengal. During the British Raj, several Indian independence activists sought refuge in French establishments in India to evade British colonial authorities, including Subramania Bharati, Lala Lajpat Rai and Sri Aurobindo.

=== Sikh-French relations ===
Maharaja Ranjit Singh's military comprised over 2000 French soldiers, three of whom rose to the rank of generals and played key roles in the modernization of the Khalsa Army. Singh also hired many Italian, American, Spanish and Prussian soldiers. The Fauj-i-Khas, also known as the French division of the army had French battle standards with its tricolor and eagle emblem. Leading the Europeanization of the army were Jean Francois Allard and Jean-Baptiste Ventura. A bust of Maharaja Ranjit Singh can still be found in Saint-Tropez, France.

=== India in World War I and World War II ===
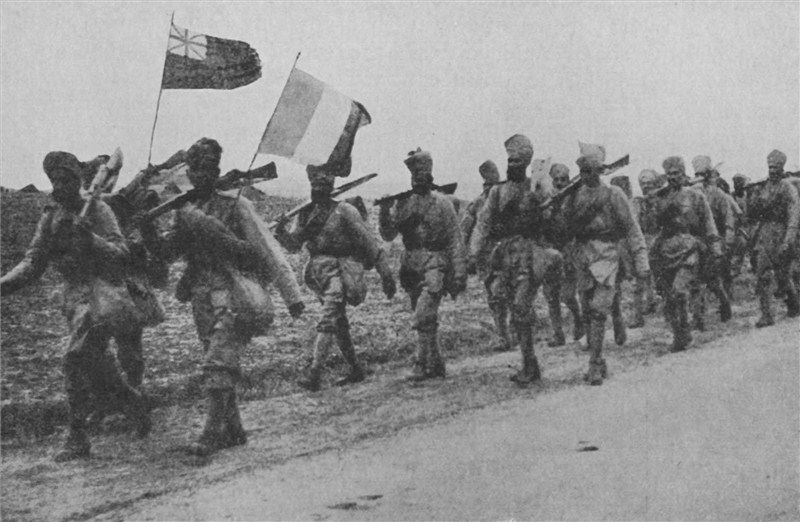
Indian reinforcements of 7th (Meerut) Division at Givenchy in December 1914 heading to participate at Battle of La Bassée during the Winter operations 1914–1915

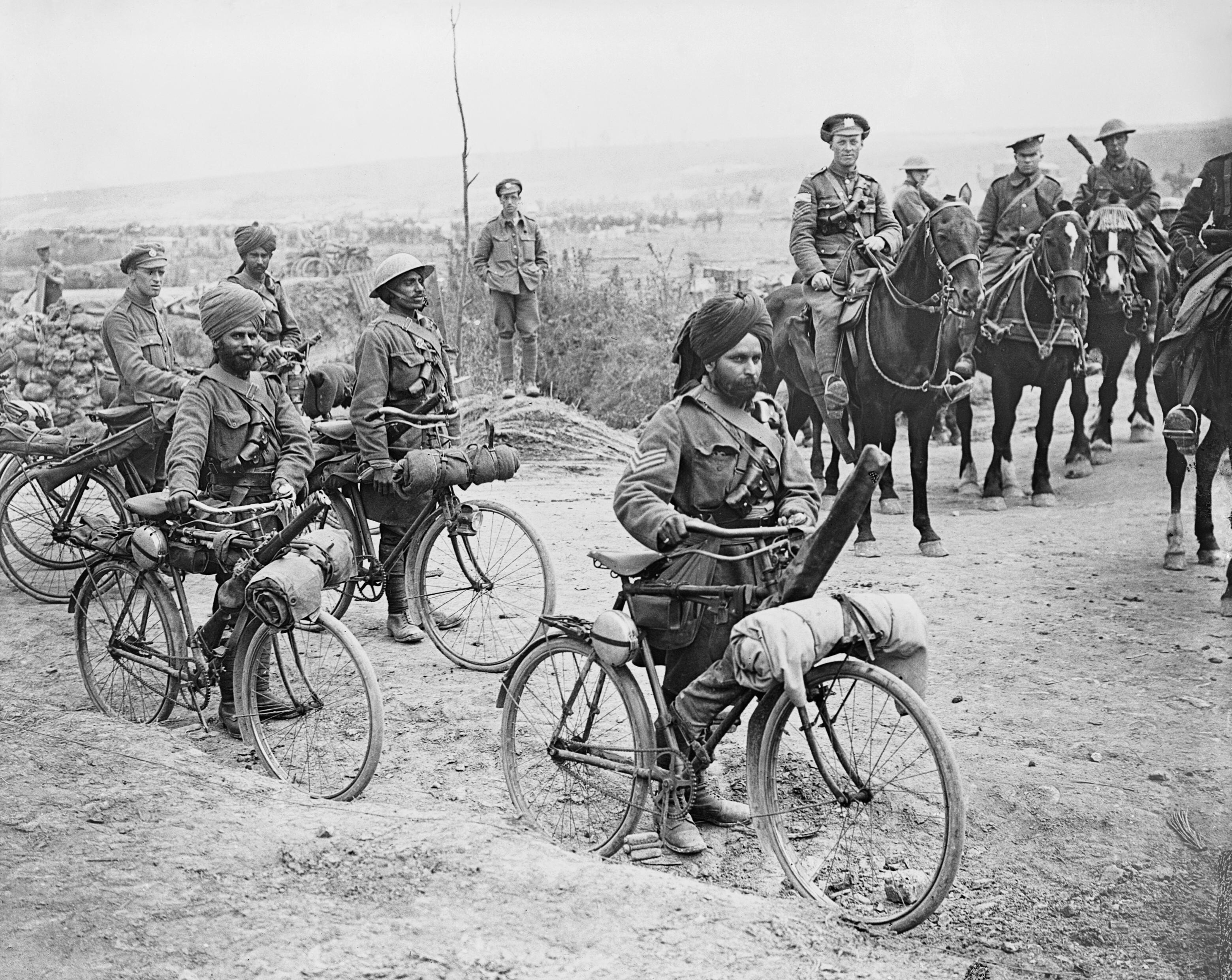
Indian bicycle troops on the Western Front (World War I) at the Battle of the Somme

The Indian Expeditionary Force A, Indian Army Service Corps, and Imperial Service Troops contributed to defend France during World War I and World War II.

Darwan Singh Negi, Gabar Singh Negi, Gobind Singh Rathore, and Mir Dast were awarded the Victoria Cross for exceptional gallantry on French battlefields. Flight Lieutenant Hardit Singh Malik of No. 28 Squadron RFC flew a Sopwith Camel over France during WWI.

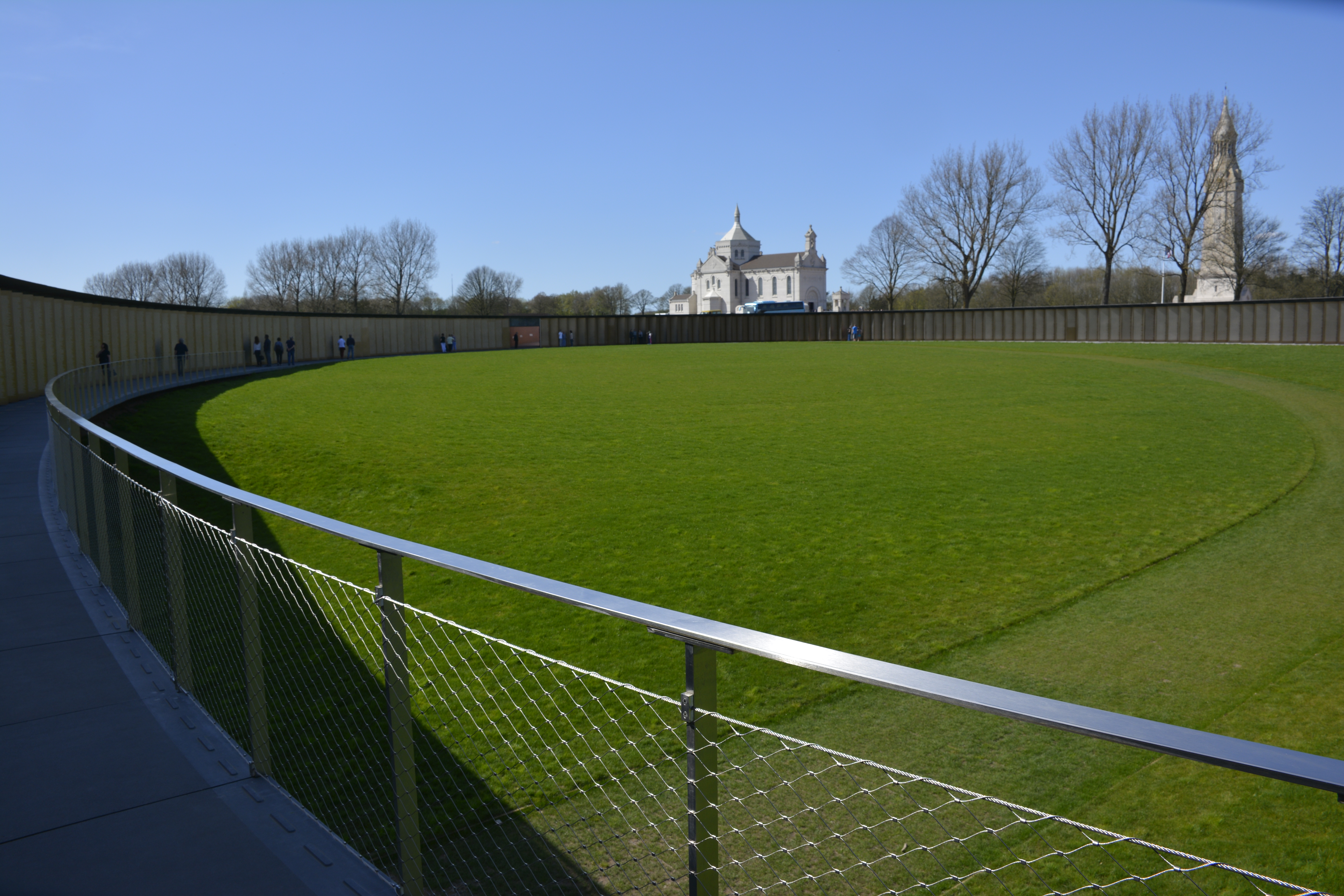
Anneau de la Mémoire memorial of Notre Dame de Lorette Ablain St.-Nazaire French Military Cemetery on Vimy Ridge lists the names of Indian wartime casualties in France

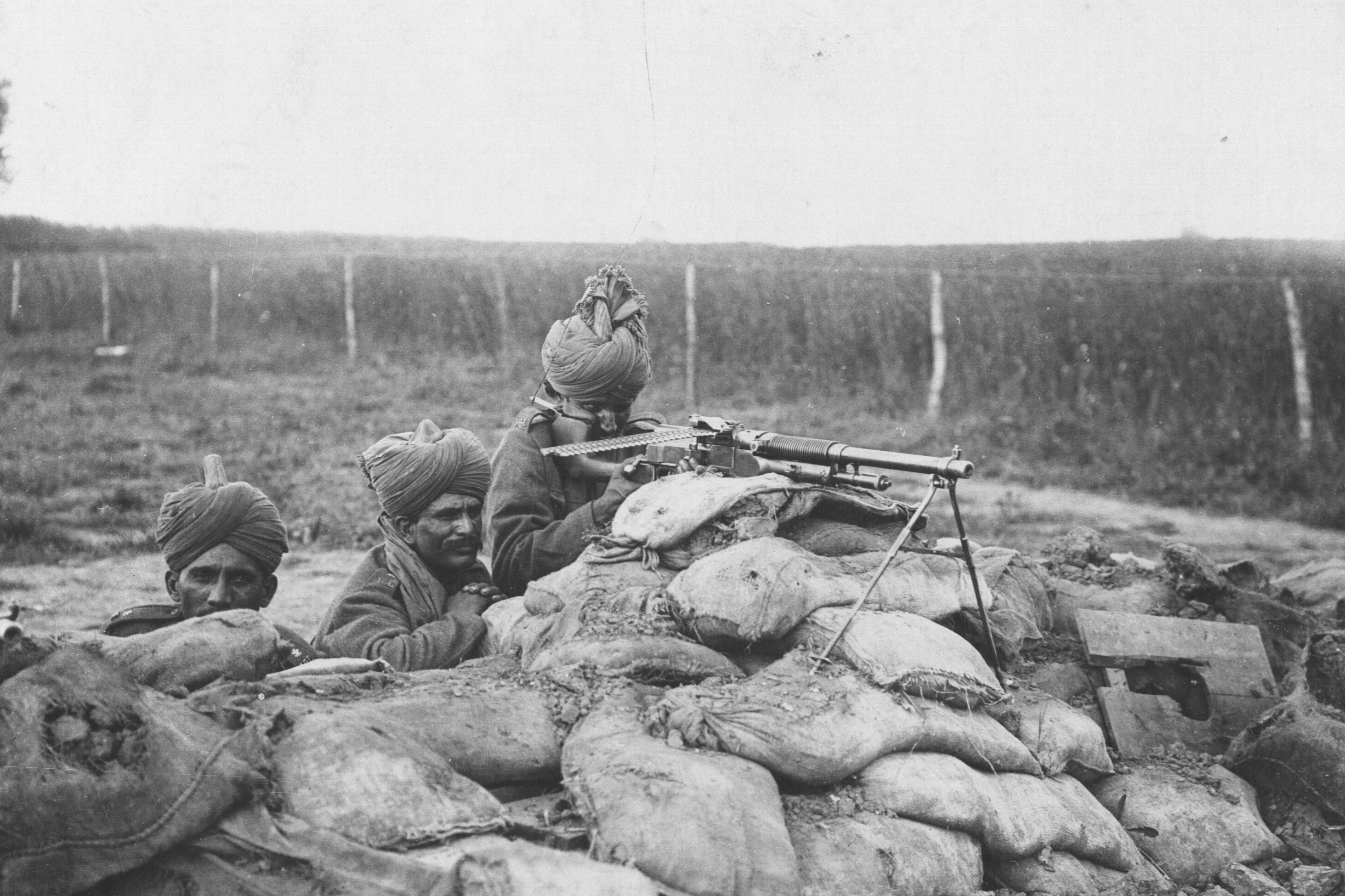
A Benet–Mercier machine gun section of 2nd Rajput Light Infantry of British Indian Army in action in Flanders, during the winter of 1914–15.

Some of the more prominent battles involving troops from the India:

- Battle of Neuve Chapelle
- Battle of Armentières
- First Battle of Ypres
- Battle of the Somme
- Battle of Loos
- Battle of Bazentin
- Battle of La Bassée
- Battle of Flers-Courcelette
- Battle of Festubert
- Battle of Aubers Ridge
- Battle of Cambrai
- the advance to the Hindenburg Line
- First Battle of Champagne

India suffered the highest World War I casualties amongst dominions, colonies, protectorates, mandates, and other territories of the British Empire. It is estimated that between 64,449 and 73,895 Indians died in Europe during the First World War (compared to between 59,330 and 62,081 Australians and between 58,639 and 64,997 Canadians).

Of the 130,000 Indians who served in Somme and Flanders theatre of operations during World War I, almost 9,000 died. According to the Commonwealth War Graves Commission, 8,128 graves of soldiers of the Indian Army and porters of the Indian Labour Corps who perished in World War I and World War II are located in France.

Marshal Ferdinand Foch, the French Commander at the Battle of Neuve Chapelle (which resulted in 4,200 Indian casualties), acknowledged the contribution of troops from India and said: "Return to your homes in the distant, sun-bathed East and proclaim how your countrymen drenched with their blood the cold northern land of France and Flanders, how they delivered it by their ardent spirit from the firm grip of a determined enemy; tell all India that we shall watch over their graves with the devotion due to all our dead. We shall cherish above all the memory of their example. They showed us the way, they made the first steps towards the final victory."

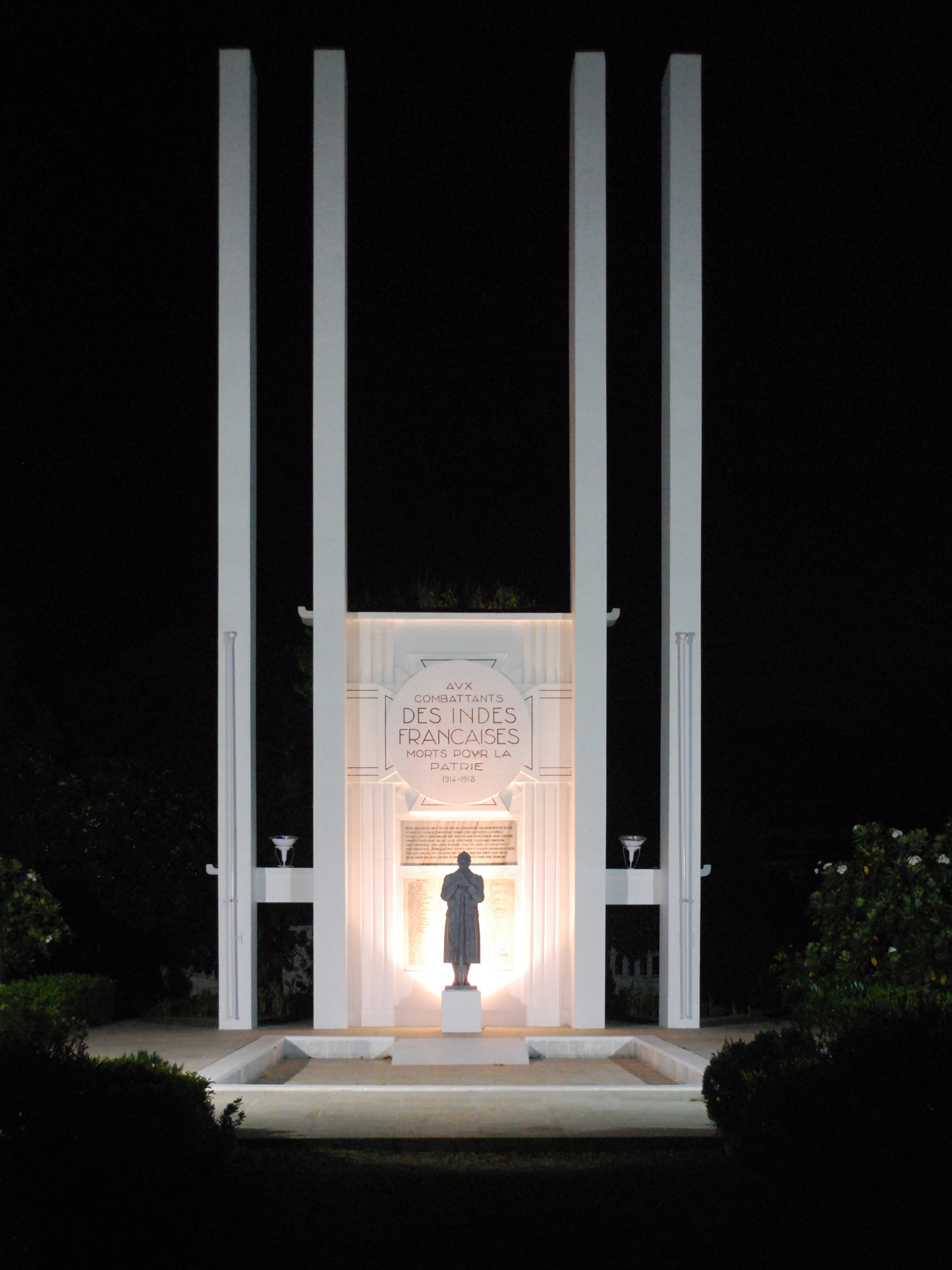
The Monument aux Morts French India War Memorial on the Beach Road in Pondicherry

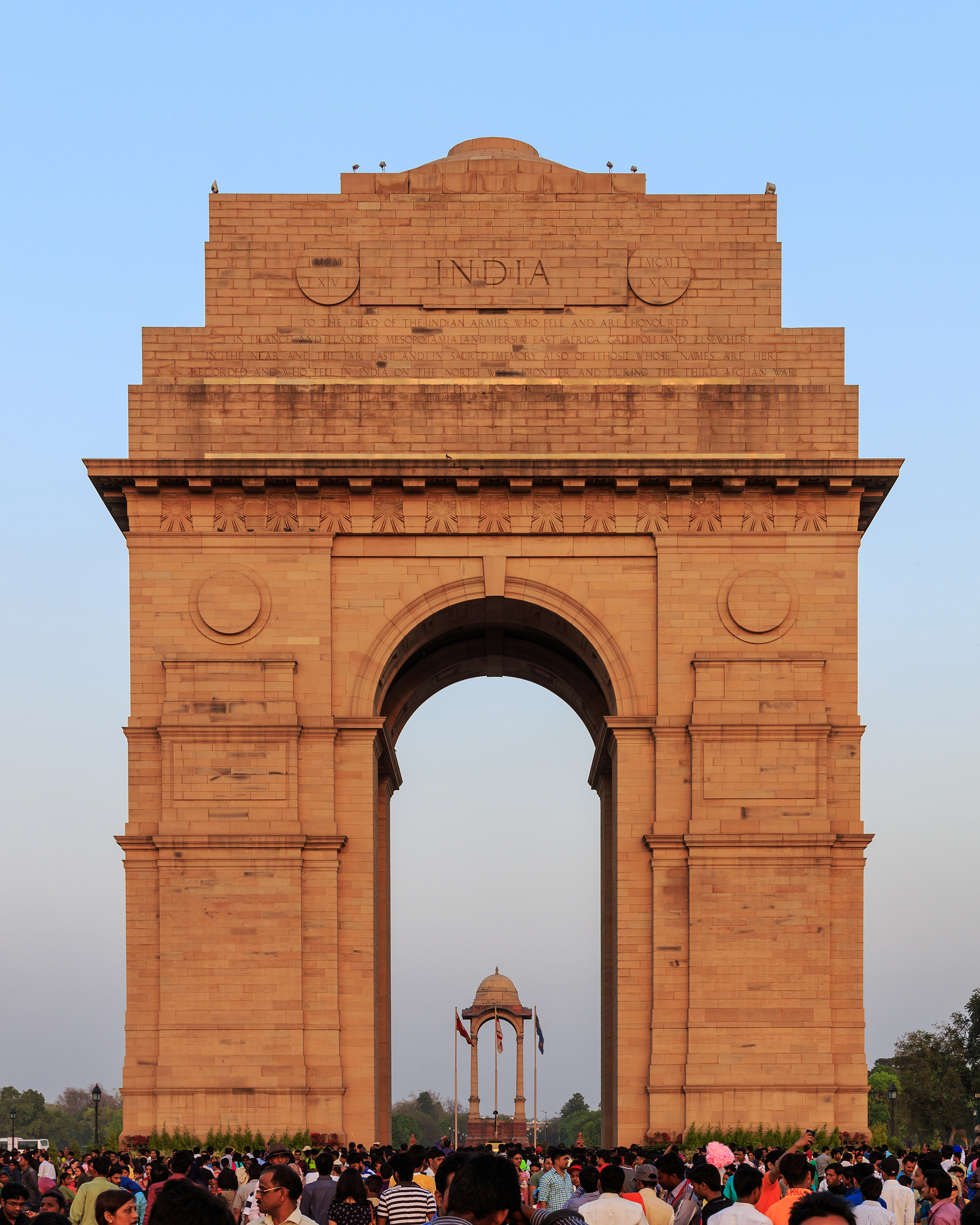
India Gate in New Delhi commemorates the sacrifices of Indian troops including on World War I and World War II battlefields in France

Due to Hindu funeral rites – where mortal remains are cremated – most Indian casualties are commemorated with inscriptions on war memorials at the Neuve-Chapelle Indian Memorial and the Anneau de la Mémoire of Notre Dame de Lorette Ablain St.-Nazaire French Military Cemetery rather than with individual graves. Military cemeteries such as: Ayette Indian and Chinese Cemetery, La Chapelette British and Indian Cemetery, Neuville-Sous-Montreuil Indian Cemetery, Gorre British and Indian Cemetery, Zelobes Indian Cemetery, Étaples Military Cemetery, Saint-Martin-lès-Boulogne Meerut Military Cemetery, Cabaret-Rouge British Cemetery, Béthune Town Cemetery, Arques-la-Bataille British Cemetery and Mazargues War Cemetery, Marseilles contain graves or memorials to Indian casualties in France. The Dieppe Canadian War Cemetery contains the grave of Pilot Officer Dastur Rustom Nariman of the Royal Indian Air Force 12 Sqdn. (R.A.F.). Colonial troops and labourers, including those from the Indian Subcontinent, are collectively identified as lascars in French military necropolis as observed at Notre Dame de Lorette Ablain St.-Nazaire French Military Cemetery.

A small number of Indians from French India, notably from Chandannagar, served as colonial infantrymen in the French Army during World War I. The Monument aux Morts in Pondicherry was built in memory of colonial troops from French India. In response to the June 1940 appeal by Charles de Gaulle, Pondicherry became the first French territory to abandon the collaborationist Vichy regime and join Free France.

=== Cession of French territories in India ===
France established diplomatic relations with the newly independent India in 1947. An agreement between France and India in 1948 stipulated that the inhabitants of France's Indian possessions would choose their political future. A treaty of cession was signed by the two countries in May 1956, and ratified by the French parliament in May 1962. On 16 August 1962, India and France exchanged the instruments of ratification, under which France ceded to India full sovereignty over the territories it held. Pondicherry and the other enclaves of Karaikal, Mahe, and Yanam came to be administered as the Union Territory of Puducherry from 1 July 1963.

The merits and deficiencies of French colonial presence in India is disputed on accounts of the exploitative nature of colonial trade, segregation of French subjects within the colonial possessions along ethnic lines (Europeans and Creoles were differentiated from ethnic Indians on electoral lists), and the colonial use of indenture labour.

== Development of bilateral relations ==
The bilateral relations with France, although globally positive, fluctuated in function of defence sales to Pakistan, including Exocet missiles, Dassault Mirage III and Dassault Mirage 5 aircraft, Breguet Atlantic aircraft, and Daphné-class and Agosta 90B-class submarines. These fluctuations were offset by especially strong relations in the fields of civil nuclear energy and aerospace.

=== Visits by heads of state and heads of government ===
A key moment in the bilateral relationship was the visit of President Jacques Chirac in 1998, which led to the signing of India's first-ever strategic partnership.

In January 2008, President Nicolas Sarkozy visited India and was honoured as the chief guest at India's Republic Day parade. Subsequently, in September 2008, Indian Prime Minister Manmohan Singh made a major visit to France.

On 14 July 2009, Prime Minister Manmohan Singh was the Guest of Honour for the Bastille Day Celebrations held in Paris. The 2009 Bastille Day military parade featured a contingent of Indian troops from the Indian Army, Indian Navy, and Indian Air Force, marching down Avenue Champs-Élysées. They were accompanied by an Indian military band playing Indian martial tunes, such as Saare Jahan Se Achcha, Haste Lushai and Qadam Qadam Badhaye Ja.

French President Sarkozy visited India for the second time from 4–7 December 2010.

French President Francois Hollande visited India on 14–15 February 2013.

Indian Prime-Minister Narendra Modi was in Paris on 10–11 April 2015 for strategic bilateral discussions with President François Hollande. A joint status report established the current state of the bilateral relationship and plans for the future, through the April 2015 India-France joint statement.

On 30 November 2015, Narendra Modi travelled to France for a 2-day visit to attend the COP 21 2015 United Nations Climate Change Conference in Paris. Modi and Hollande jointly invited over 100 world leaders to join InSPA (International Agency for Solar Policy & Application), a global initiative to promote low-carbon renewable solar energy technologies.

A delegation headed by President François Hollande including several French cabinet ministers (foreign minister Laurent Fabius, defence minister Jean-Yves Le Drian, finance minister Michel Sapin, culture minister Fleur Pellerin, and environment minister Segolene Royal) travelled to India on 24 January 2016 for a 3-day visit.

Speaking at the Indo-French CEOs Forum and the India France Business Summit in Chandigarh on 24 January 2016, President François Hollande stated his intentions to consolidate the strategic partnership with India and implement decisions taken during Prime Minister Narendra Modi's visit to France. Modi reciprocated by declaring that India and France are made for each other, stating that: "The trust and friendship with France is an asset for us". He highlighted the need to strengthen people-to-people ties between the two nations.

President François Hollande was the chief guest at the 67th Indian Republic Day parade in New Delhi on 26 January 2016. France, along with Britain are the only countries to be invited 5 times to this symbolic national ceremonial event. The 2016 Indian Republic Day parade featured the first-ever participation of foreign troops in the march-past. 124 French Army soldiers from the 35th Infantry Regiment of the 7th Armoured Brigade based in Belfort, accompanied by a ceremonial military band-music contingent based in Lyon, marched down Rajpath in New Delhi.

The visit gained favourable media coverage, which underscored the consistently cordial and exceptional nature of Indo-French bilateral relations. Media analysts decoded the political significance of the protocol courtesies extended to France. Leading Indian newspapers published editorials lauding successful bilateral cooperation in the domains of science and technology, aerospace, nuclear energy, defence and counter-terrorism. Kanwal Sibal, the former Foreign Secretary of India and former Ambassador to France opined: "He (President Hollande) recognises the esteem India has for France and the growing affinity between the two countries." (...) "Hollande attaches value to the personal rapport he has developed with Modi, recognises the dynamism he is imparting to the Indian economy and believes in the growing affinity between the two countries. On this basis the Indo-French strategic ties should grow in strength."

In March 2018, Prime Minister Narendra Modi received the French President Emmanuel Macron. The two leaders discussed the French-Indian relations over the years, and signed multiple agreements to strengthen bilateral ties. Modi commented that although the strategic partnership between the two countries is "just 20 years old," the cultural and spiritual partnership is older. He stated that the values of liberty, equality, and fraternity echo not just in France, but have been embedded in India's Constitution as well. Macron told the media, "We want India as our first strategic partner here, and we want to be India's first strategic partner in Europe, and even the western world."

In August 2019, Aparna Pande, a Research fellow at the Hudson Institute wrote an article claiming that France had become India's new best friend, replacing Russia as India's closest international partner.

In January 2024, Macron paid a state-visit to India as the Chief Guest for the country's 75th Republic Day celebrations, marking his second visit to India. Macron was accompanied by a high-level delegation, including key ministers, senior officials, and industry leaders. As a symbol of defence ties, aircraft from the French Air and Space Force flew alongside Indian Air Force jets over Kartavya Path, and a French military contingent took part in the Republic Day parade. President Droupadi Murmu hosted a banquet in his honour and welcomed him to the 'At-Home' reception at Rashtrapati Bhavan.

In February 2025, Narendra Modi paid a three-day visit to France at the invitation of President Emmanuel Macron. The visit included co-chairing the Artificial Intelligence Action Summit in Paris on 10–11 February, where both leaders emphasized international collaboration to ensure AI development serves global public interest. This marked Modi’s sixth visit to France and followed Macron’s January 2024 visit to India as Chief Guest for the 75th Republic Day. In Marseille, the leaders paid tribute to Indian soldiers of World War I at the Mazargues military cemetery, jointly inaugurated the Consulate General of India, visited the port, and toured the International Thermonuclear Experimental Reactor (ITER) facility. The visit underscored the deepening strategic partnership between India and France across technology, diplomacy, and historical remembrance.

On 17 February 2026, Macron arrived in Mumbai, jogged along Marine Drive, and paid tribute to the victims of the 26/11 terror attacks. PM Modi hosted Macron for bilateral talks focused on strengthening India-France relations. Macron praised the "remarkable acceleration" of ties between India and France and stated that the shift in relations was driven by the "changing international order," emphasizing that both nations aimed to avoid being "subjected to any form of hegemony" or the "conflict of a few." Moreover, in the same month, President Macron visited India for 3 days, participating in the AI Impact Summit in New Delhi alongside PM Modi.

In June 2026, Modi paid his eighth state visit to France. He accompanied Macron to Nice where both the leaders jointly inaugurated the Bharat Innovates event held between 14 and 16 June. At the event, Macron described India as "a very great nation of innovation" that has become "indispensable" in global technological development and praised India's technological achievements like the Chandrayaan-3 lunar mission.

In July 2026, French Chief of the Defence staff General Fabien Mandon visited India to discuss measures for enhancing bilateral strategic and defence cooperation.

According to the data submitted by the Ministry of External Affairs in the Rajya Sabha in August 2026, the Indian government apent approximately Rs. 557.51 cr on PM Narendra Modi's foreign visits between 2021 and mid-2026, including Rs. 187 cr in 2025 and Rs. 74.58 cr in 2026.

== Strategic partnership ==
The France–India partnership covers all aspects of bilateral cooperation with a strategic component. It is based on close cooperation in the sectors of defense, civil nuclear energy, space and security (including cyber security, counter-terrorism, and intelligence), and now includes a strong Indo-Pacific component.

India-France Strategic Partnership was officially launched in 1998.

This strategic partnership has benefited from sustained political investments made at the highest levels of decision making. The longstanding relationship between France and India has led to extensive cooperation in the domains of aerospace, civil nuclear energy, and military matters. Science and technology cooperation, deep-rooted cultural ties, and a historically francophile literary and fine arts community in India have provided solid foundations for the strategic relationship. In November 2011, the Foundation for National Security Research in New Delhi published India's Strategic Partners: A Comparative Assessment, ranking India's top strategic partners with a score out of 90 points. Russia ranked the highest at 62, followed by the United States (58), France (51), UK (41), Germany (37), and Japan (34).

France's voting patterns in the UN Security Council on matters of core interest to India has endeared the country as an all-weather friend of India. France was one of the few nations who did not condemn India's nuclear tests in 1998. It supported India's bid to become a permanent member of the UN Security Council and the G-8. France is one of the largest suppliers of nuclear fuel to India, and signed a "Framework Agreement for Civil Nuclear Co-operation" in January 2008. After India's waiver from the Nuclear Suppliers Group (NSG), both nations signed an agreement that would pave the way for the sale of French-made nuclear reactors to India on 30 September 2008. France is a major supplier of military equipment to India. Procurement of Dassault Mirage 2000 fighter aircraft and a squadron of DCNS Scorpène-class submarines (called Kalvari-class submarines) are examples of strategic defence acquisitions. The armed-services of both nations conduct joint-exercises on an annual basis. France and India also maintain a discreet "strategic dialogue" that covers joint cooperation against terrorism. The strategic autonomy of the French Force de frappe resonates well within Indian strategic circles.

French Overseas regions of Réunion and Mayotte establish French sovereign presence in the Indian Ocean. Réunion has a significant ethnic Indian population colloquially called Malbars, which includes all Réunionnais of Indian origin. Réunion's location in the Indian Ocean makes France ideally positioned to leverage advantages of the Neighbourhood first policy and Indian Ocean outreach priorities which were announced by the government of Narendra Modi.

On 20 November 2015, a week after the attacks in Paris, French Minister Laurent Fabius visited New Delhi and met with Prime Minister Narendra Modi and Foreign Minister Sushma Swaraj. The discussion centered around enhancing cooperation to fight terrorism, as well as preparations for the 2015 Climate summit in Paris. After the meeting, Fabius stated that France and India were "in the same boat" with regards to terrorism saying, "I want to say that France is grateful for tremendous support it has received from the international community including Indian friends... We have a good cooperation with our Indian friends on this. I was discussing it this morning with Prime Minister Modi. We shall develop our cooperation."

On 7 May 2025, French Foreign Minister Jean-Noël Barrot condemned the April 22 Pahalgam attack and affirmed France’s understanding of India’s right to defend itself against terrorism. He emphasized the importance of restraint from both India and Pakistan to prevent further escalation. The French government also expressed full support for India's efforts in combating terrorism.

In June 2025, both India and France were systematically targeted in a disinformation campaign by Pakistan and China concerning India’s air power. The Pakistani and Chinese social media reportedly created a narrative to create cracks in the India-France strategic partnership through the dissemination of fake news, claiming that India now had a serious dispute with the French aerospace company Dassault Aviation. However, the Indian government did not make any public statements that'd indicate such a conflict. US–China Economic and Security Review Commission confirmed that China was behind the disinformation campaign.

In February 2026, the ties between India and France were elevated to a "Special Strategic Partnership" with a shared belief in "strategic autonomy." Several institutes were launched including the Indo-French Centre for AI in Health, the Indo-French Centre for Digital Science and Technology, and the National Centre of Alliance for Skilling in Aeronautics. PM Modi called these institutes "future-building platforms." The elevation was built upon the 1998 initiative and the Horizon 2047 Roadmap adopted in 2023. The new designation signaled a deeper coordination at bilateral, regional and global levels, with both countries committing to a rules-based international order, reformed multilateralism and closer engagement in the Indo-Pacific.

=== Institutional structure for dialogue ===
==== Between National Security Advisers ====
France and India have instituted a Strategic Dialogue at the level of National Security Advisers. The 27th round of Strategic Dialogue was held in Paris on 12–13 January 2015. The Foreign Office Consultations at the level of Foreign Secretaries take place every year. The most recent one took place in January 2025.

==== Between Foreign Ministers ====
In 2026, the two countries established an annual Foreign Ministers Comprehensive Dialogue to coordinate on economic security, global issues and people-to-people ties.

In June 2026, PM Narendra Modi visited France and Slovakia, strengthening ties between India and Europe. He was invited to Slovakia by the Prime Minister Robert Fico, and Modi's visit to Slovakia was the first visit by an Indian PM since Slovakia's independence in 1993.

== Military relations ==
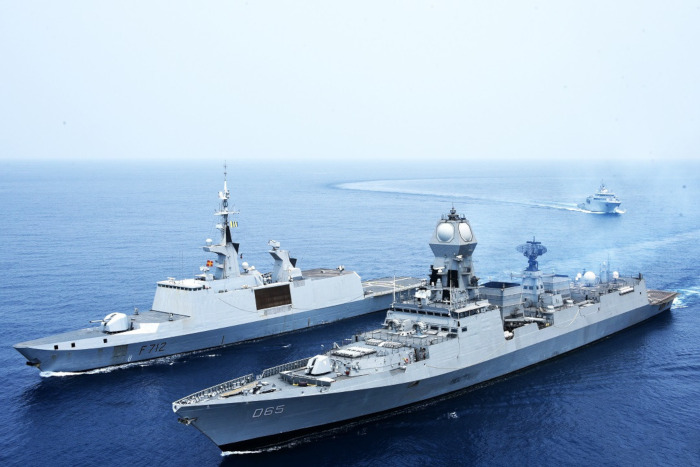
Indian Navy and French Navy during exercise of Varuna 2022.

Defense partnership and cooperation between France and India is rooted in historic military interactions, which date back to the Carnatic Wars. India was heavily involved in both World War I and World War II, and suffered huge loss of lives on battlefields in France.

A 400-strong contingent of the Indian armed forces led the Bastille Day parade in 2009, with the Prime Minister of India serving as the Guest of Honour – the first time ever that Indian troops took part in another country's national day parade.

Under the framework of the structured talks within the Indo-French Defence Cooperation Agreement, several meetings on industrial collaboration and service exchanges are held regularly. The 3rd meeting of the Joint Working Group (JWG) on Counter-terrorism took place in New Delhi on 19–20 November 2012. The 11th meeting of the Indo-French Research Forum (IFRF) was held in Paris from 17 to 19 December 2012. The 15th High Level Committee for Defence Cooperation (HCDC), at the level of Defence Secretaries, met in Paris on 12 January 2015.

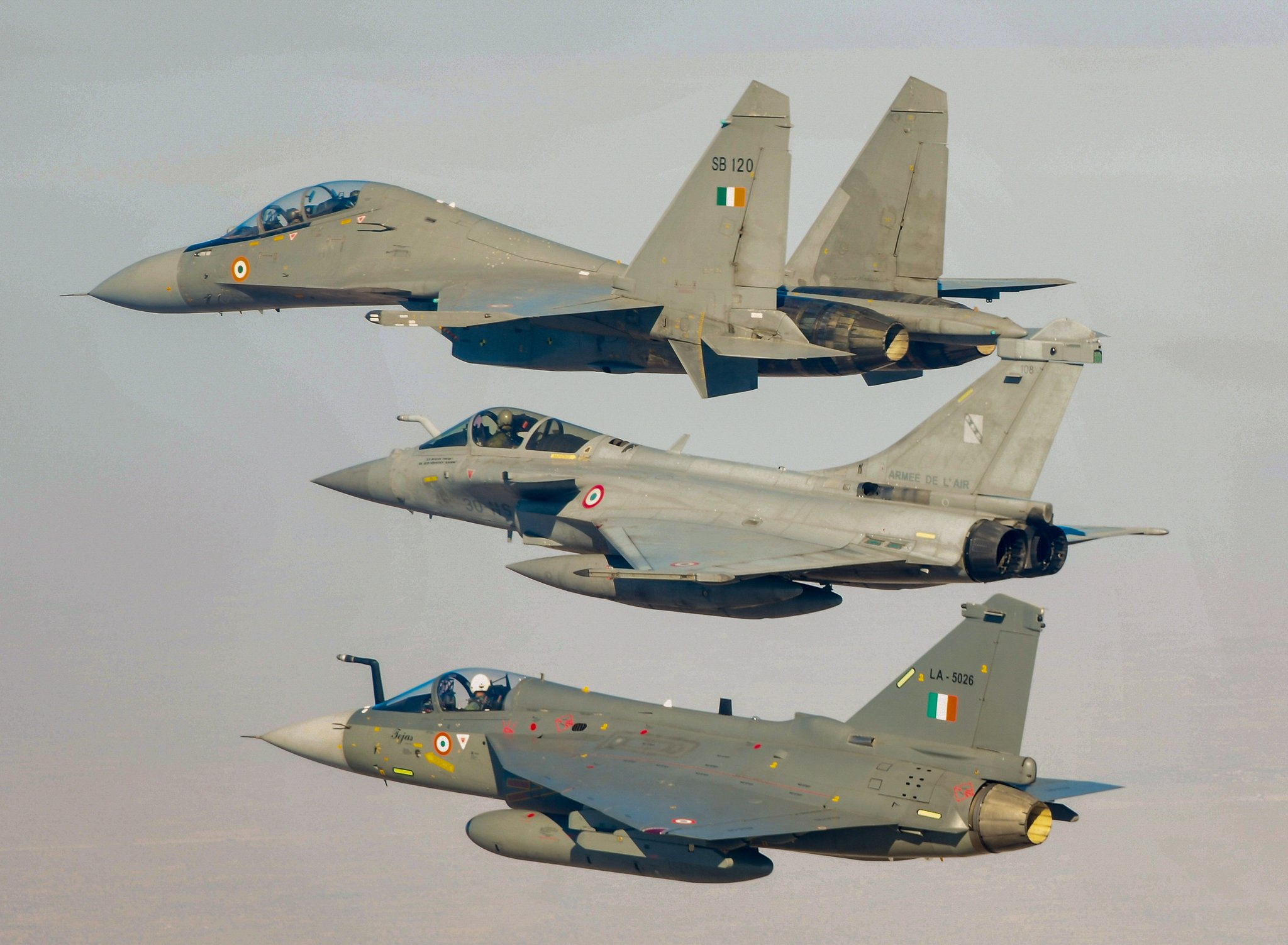
Indian Su-30MKI and Tejas with French Rafale in the middle of the formation during Exercise Garuda 2022.

Indo-French Air Force Exercise Garuda IV was held at Istres air base in France from 14 to 25 June 2010. The Varuna Naval Exercise was conducted in the Mediterranean Sea, off the port of Toulon from 19 to 22 July 2012. The first Indo-France joint army exercise named Shakti was conducted in India at Chaubattia from 9 to 22 October 2011. In 2013, Army Chief General Bikram Singh visited Commandement des Forces Terrestres Land Forces Command in Lille and the French Military School at Draguignan. In 2015, Vice Admiral SPS Cheema, FOC-in-C West, was hosted by the French Navy at Toulon. The Indo-French Joint Army exercise was held in Rajasthan, India from 19 to 21 January 2016.

Indian Prime Minister Modi stated that "We consider France one of our most reliable defense allies."

An agreement signed in 2018 enables the Indian and French Navies to use each other's naval bases. Indian warships will have access to French bases in the Indian and southern Pacific oceans.

At the Shangri-La Dialogue in Singapore in 2018, French and British defense ministers announced that they would sail warships through the South China Sea to challenge China's military expansion.

During Prime Minister Narendra Modi's visit to Paris in July 2023, India and France agreed to develop new generation military contracts, estimated to be worth €9 billion ($10 billion).

In December 2024, France and India launched the FRIND-X (France-India Defence Startup Excellence) initiative in Paris, involving Direction générale de l'armement (DGA) and India's Defence Innovation Agency. Aligned with the HORIZON 2047 vision and the India-France Defence Industrial Roadmap, FRIND-X serves as a collaborative platform bringing together stakeholders from both countries' defence sectors, including startups, investors, incubators, accelerators, and academic institutions, to promote innovation and strengthen bilateral defence cooperation.

In October 2025, French Army Chief General Pierre Schill expressed interest in Indian weapon systems following their performance during Operation Sindoor, particularly long-range rockets, loitering munitions, and counter-drone systems. During his visit to New Delhi for the UN Troop Contributing Countries Chiefs conference, he discussed defence cooperation with Indian Army Chief General Upendra Dwivedi and noted that the French Army was considering the Indian-made Pinaka rocket system as part of its artillery renewal.

The first Maintenance, Repair and Overhaul (MRO) facility dedicated to Safran’s M88 engines outside France for Rafale aircraft is slated to be functional in India. The groundbreaking ceremony took place in 2025.

=== Intensified collaboration with India and the Quad ===
On 9 September 2020, the first India-France-Australia Trilateral Dialogue took place, with the foreign secretaries of the three countries meeting via videoconference. They discussed geostrategic challenges, their respective strategies for a free, open and inclusive Indo-Pacific, and prospects for cooperation in the region, especially in the context of the COVID public health crisis.

In February 2021, France announced that a French Rubis-class nuclear attack submarine, Emeraude, had successfully concluded a passage through the South China Sea to prove its capacity for the connection with Australian, American and Japanese strategic partners.

On 24 February, a meeting of the India-France-Australia Trilateral Dialogue was held, to take stock of the progress made since the previous foreign secretary level trilateral dialogue held in September 2020. This included amongst others maritime security, humanitarian aid and disaster relief, blue economy, protection of marine global commons, combatting illegal fishing, and cooperation in multilateral fora. They also deliberated on the next steps to be taken for furthering trilateral cooperation in the Indo-Pacific region.

On 30 March 2021, French Navy's amphibious assault helicopter carrier Tonnerre and escort frigate Surcouf arrived at the Kochi port in Kerala, India, ahead of a joint naval exercise with the four Quad member countries. The French naval drill exercise, called La Perouse, was scheduled to take place from 5 to 7 April 2021. The 2021 edition was the first edition with participants from all four Quad members. The two warships were on a five-month-long deployment in the Indo-Pacific.

On 13 April 2021, a new India-France-Australia Trilateral Dialogue meeting was planned in New Delhi.

== Trade and investment ==
Indo-French bilateral trade has been growing, though it has yet to reach the €12 billion target set by both governments during the visit of the French President to India in January 2008.

=== Foreign direct investment (FDI) ===
France is the 9th largest foreign investor in India, with a cumulative investment of approximately US$3 billion. From April 2000 to June 2012, the investment amounted to US$2.98 billion, representing 2% of total inflows. There have been 952 approved technical and financial collaborations with France. The top sectors attracting FDI inflows from France include Chemicals (other than fertilisers) (18.80%), Cement and Gypsum Products (15.82%), Services Sector (financial & non-financial) (9.41%), Fuels (power & oil refinery) (6.47%), Electrical Equipments (including computer software & electronics) (5.34%), and the auto sector. There are about 800 French companies in India, including subsidiaries, joint ventures, representative offices or branch offices, with approximately 150,000 employees.

In 2011, India was the 13th largest foreign investor in France in terms of project numbers. Indian investments in France have been growing, and Indian companies have invested around €1 billion from April 1996. These investments span different sectors such as pharmaceuticals (Ranbaxy and Wockhardt), Software (Tata Consultancy Services, Infosys & Wipro), Wine (Kingfisher), Steel (Tata, Electrosteel), Plastics (Sintex Plastics Technology Limited), Railway wagons (Titagarh Wagons), Aerospace (Cades/Axis), and Autoparts (Jyoti) among others. 110 Indian-owned companies, including 27 greenfield investments, are present in France, and employ over 5,600 individuals.

The Indo-French CEOs Forum, formed in 2009, was tasked to identify new avenues for cooperation and take initiatives to facilitate business links between both countries. The 16th session of the Joint Committee for Economic and Technical Cooperation, held on 23–25 June 2010 in Paris at the ministerial level, addressed issues related to commerce and trade. The fifth meeting of India France CEOs’ Forum took place in New Delhi on 22–23 November 2012.

=== Aerospace ===
==== Aviation ====
Indian companies are major clients for Airbus and ATR aircraft. Air India, IndiGo and AirAsia India operate extensive fleets of Airbus passenger aircraft.

France has been a long-standing and reliable supplier of fighter planes and light utility helicopters to the Indian armed services. Aircraft such as Breguet Alizé, Dassault Ouragan, Dassault Mystère IV, Sepecat Jaguar, Aerospatiale SA 315B Lama, Aérospatiale Alouette III and Dassault Mirage 2000 are among those supplied by France. France also supplies Turbomeca TM 333 and jointly developed the HAL/Turbomeca Shakti helicopter engines for HAL Dhruv. The DRDO 3D Multi-Function Control Radar (MFCR) was developed as part of the Indian anti-ballistic missile programme in collaboration with THALES of France. DCNS is building six Scorpène submarines of the Kalvari class, which will be armed with SM.39 Exocet anti-ship missiles, under a technology transfer agreement at Mazagon Docks in Mumbai.

The purchase of Mirage 2000 jets by India in the 1980s marked a key milestone in bilateral defence ties. The deal reflected India's long-term strategy to diversify its fighter fleet and enhance precision strike capabilities. The acquisition predated regional arms responses and was based on doctrinal and technical factors.

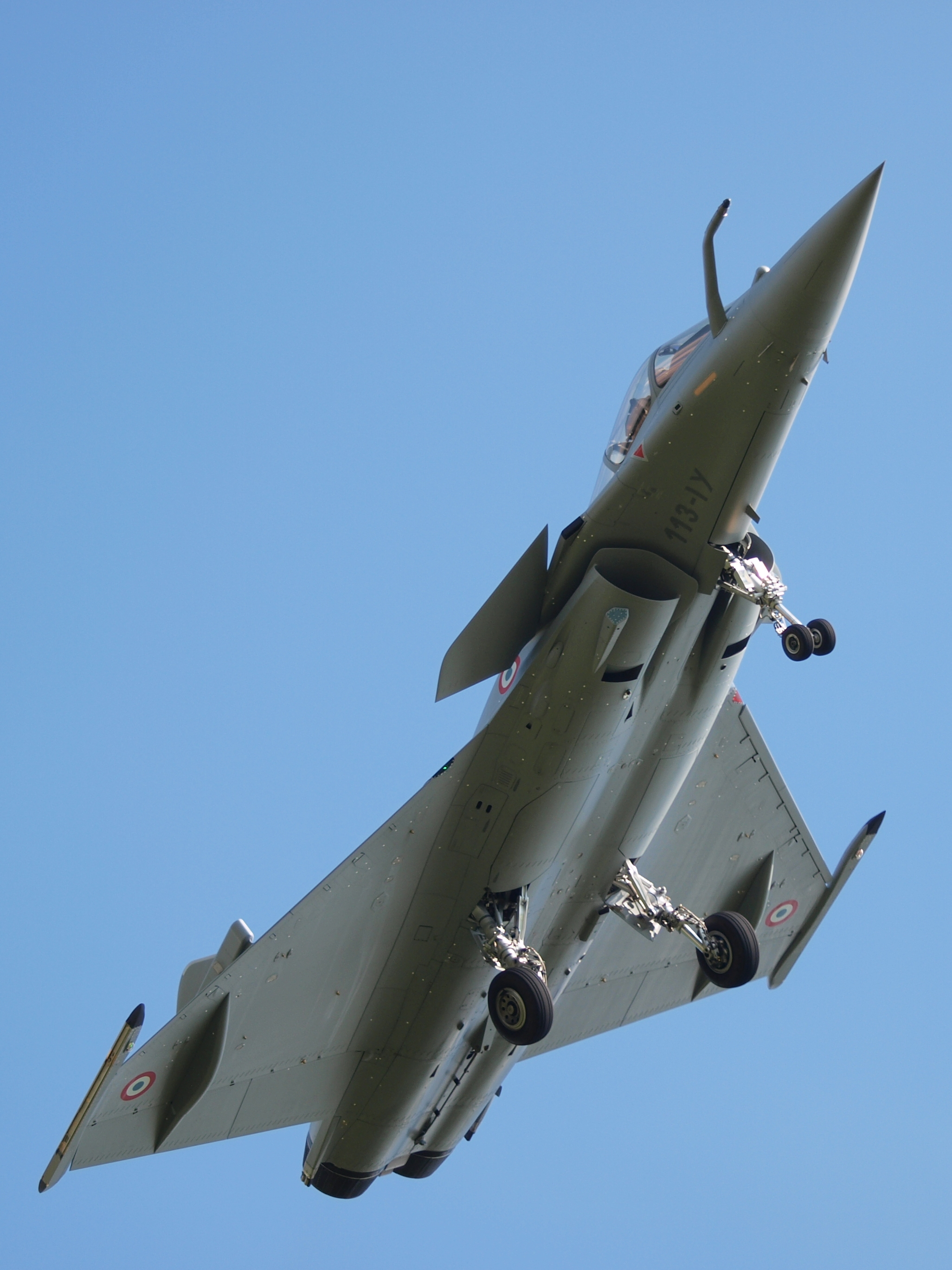
Indian Air Force acquired 36 Dassault Rafale medium multi-role combat aircraft

Dassault Rafale won the Indian MMRCA competition to supply 126 medium multi-role combat aircraft to the Indian Air Force. In April 2015, the inabilities to conclude negotiations on contractual obligations led the Modi government to transform the acquisition into a intergovernmental agreement of procurement for 36 aircraft in flyaway condition, intended to equip three squadrons of the Indian Air Force. Defense analysts raised concerns that equipment procurement requirements which were defined two decades ago are out of sync with current requirements and the future nature of air-combat. Air forces of advanced Western nations, especially the US and France, are restructuring their air forces by increasing space-based assets and reducing fleets of crewed combat aircraft. Autonomous drones have become the preferred platform for high-risk missions over enemy territory in both high and low intensity conflict zones. NATO uses aerial reconnaissance drones to monitor the borders of Europe, and the US uses maritime surveillance drones in the Western Pacific and uncrewed combat drones in missions against low-value and unsophisticated targets in Iraq, Afghanistan, Libya and Syria. Defense white-papers published in OECD countries show that the use of combat and reconnaissance pilotless vehicles, like the flight-tested Dassault nEUROn and Northrop Grumman X-47B UAVs or the Boeing X-37 robotic spacecraft will become widespread in the years ahead.

The world’s largest Maintenance, Repair and Overhaul (MRO) facility for Safran SA’s CFM LEAP aircraft engines was built and inaugurated in Hyderabad, India.

==== Space ====
Since 1993, ISRO and CNES (French National Space Agency) have operated under an umbrella agreement, facilitating successful joint missions like Megha-Tropiques and SARAL. ISRO has also launched French SPOT satellites (Spot-6 & SPOT-7) on PSLV satellite launch vehicles.

Through a commercial Launch Service Agreement between Antrix Corporation Limited (the commercial arm of ISRO) and ASTRIUM SAS (a Company under EADS, France), two advanced Remote Sensing SPOT satellites were successfully launched in 2013 and 2014 aboard ISRO's Polar Satellite Launch Vehicle.

Arianespace, based at France, has been a major provider of launch services for Indian Geo-Stationary satellites. Subsequent to the launch of APPLE satellite, 18 Indian satellites were launched by Arianespace. On 7 October 2016, GSAT-18 communication satellite was launched successfully aboard an Ariane 5 VA-231 launcher from Kourou, French Guiana.

=== Civil nuclear energy ===
A landmark Framework Agreement on Civil Nuclear Cooperation was signed between India and France on 30 September 2008 during the visit of Prime Minister Dr Manmohan Singh to France. Subsequently, during the visit of President Nicolas Sarkozy to India from 4–7 December 2010, the General Framework Agreement and the Early Works Agreement between NPCIL and Areva for implementation of EPR NPP Units at Jaitapur Nuclear Power Project were signed.

=== Education ===
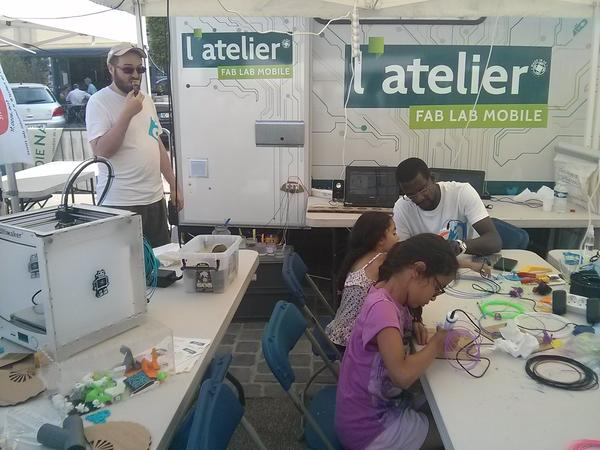
L'Atelier, an open access road-mobile Fab lab involving University of Technology of Compiègne deployed to the 2015 Libre Software Meeting in Beauvais, France.

Indians spend approximately 7.5% of household income on education.

Campus France India, a student recruitment initiative of the French embassy in India, showcases France as an education destination for Indian students. From 1 to 7 October 2015, representatives from French universities and visa officers visited Bangalore, Chennai, Pune and Kochi for course opportunities and visa guidance road-show. The French government offers 5-year visas to encourage more Indian students to study in France and allows students who have completed their studies in France an extra year to look for employment within their sector. In 2014, France hosted 3,000 Indian students, many of whom were provided full-scholarships, covering the costs of education, boarding, lodging, and air-travel. The low costs of high-quality education has made France the third most preferred destination globally for international students.

== Education, science, and technology ==
=== Education ===
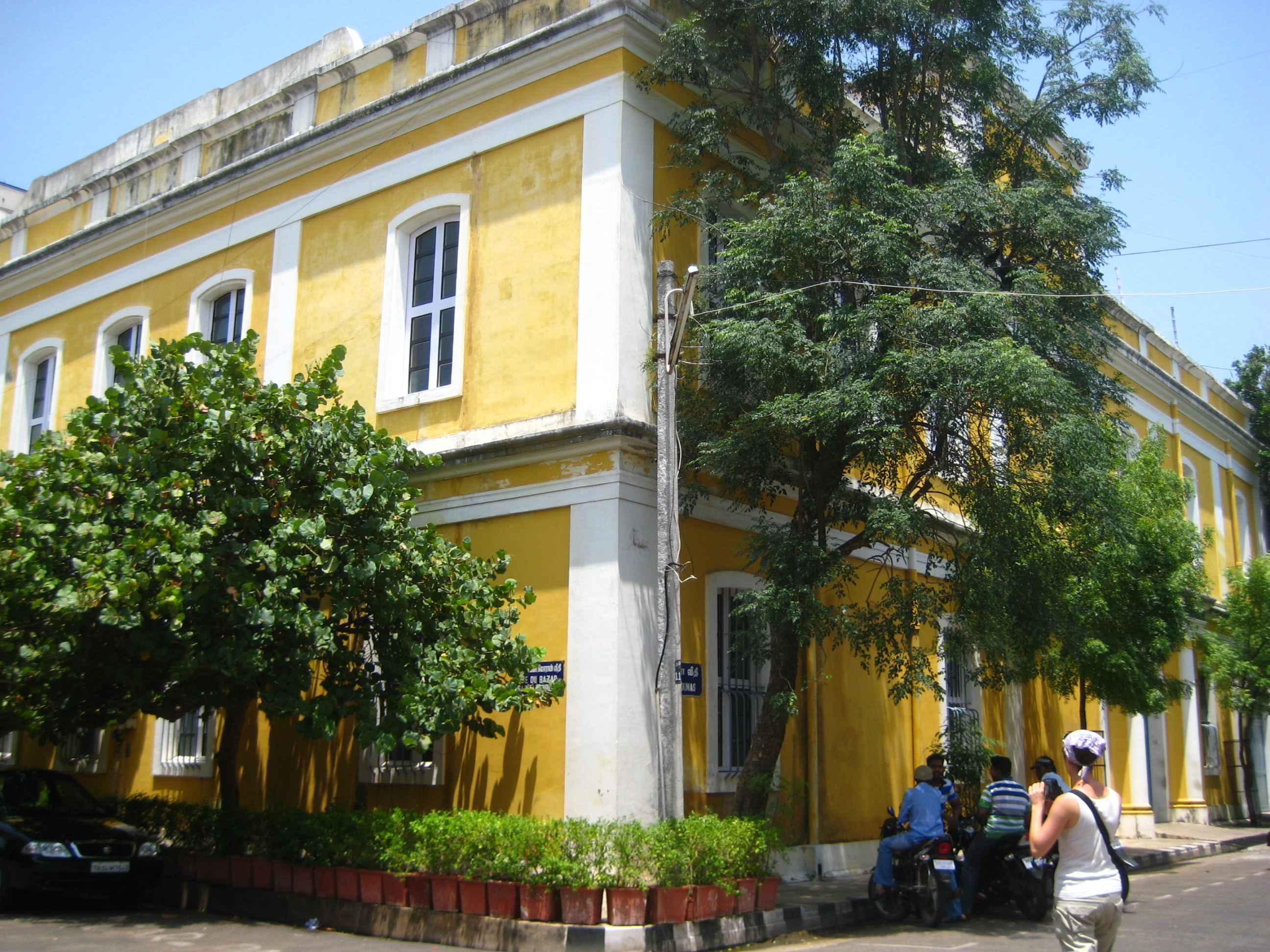
Building of the École française d'Extrême-Orient in Pondicherry

The bilateral educational cooperation between India and France has grown over the last few years. France and India established a Consortrium of Indo-French Universities to increase educational cooperation. Around 300 MoUs have been signed between Indian and French universities and private institutions. The number of Indian students studying in France in various fields has increased over the years. For the academic year 2011–2012, 2550 Indian students came to France.

The framework for bilateral educational cooperation is provided by the Educational Exchange Programme (EEP), which includes mutual recognition of degrees, bolstering the research programme and increasing student-scholar research mobility through a flexible visa regime. A Joint Working Group has also been set up under the EEP. One of the most important initiatives in the field of education has been the cooperation on the new IIT in Rajasthan, following a joint declaration in 2008. A Letter of Intent (LOI) has been signed in 2012.

In pursuant to the 1956 Treaty establishing De Jure Cession of French Establishments in India, France operates two world-class scientific research laboratories in India: French Institute of Pondicherry (IFP) and the École française d'Extrême-Orient (EFEO). In December 2014, Pondicherry University hosted the inaugural Indo-French Social Sciences Winter School. Pondicherry University and French Institute of Pondicherry (IFP) jointly conducted the 2016 Social Sciences Winter School on the theme of Mobility and Social Dynamics from 28 November to 2 December 2016. The biennial event is attended by academics from France and India who lead multidisciplinary training workshops, addressing theoretical and methodological issues in social science research.

Alliance Française has an extensive network of 19 teaching-centres within India and is well known for French-language courses and cultural programmes. French is the second most popular European language in India after English.

=== Scientific and technical cooperation ===
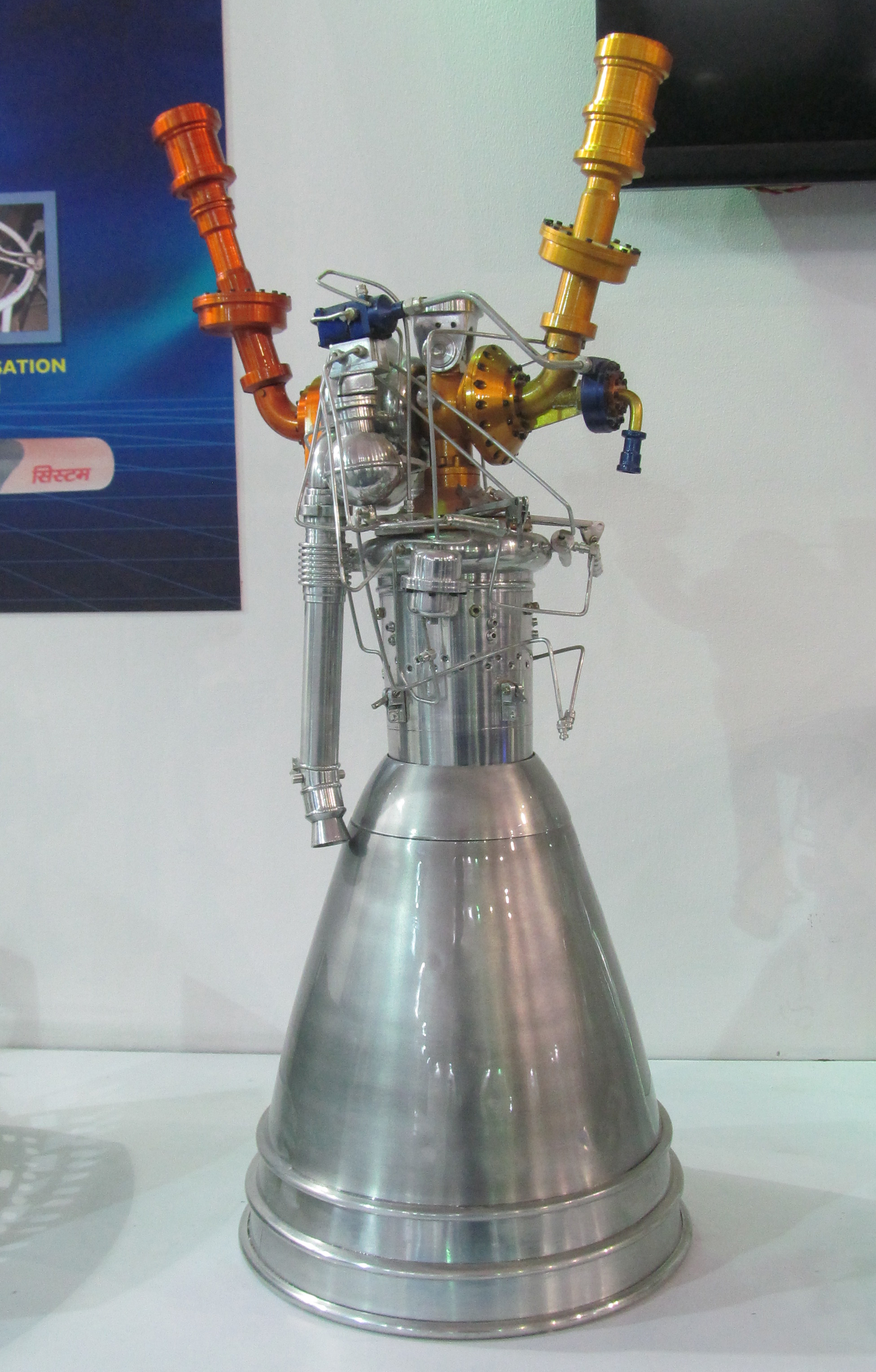
India's Vikas rocket engine, which powers both the PSLV and GSLV, benefited from collaboration on the CNES/SEP Viking 4A rocket engine.

Pasteur Institute in Coonoor, Tamil Nadu which opened on 6 April 1907 is one of the oldest vaccine manufacturing public sectors enterprises in India.

Collaborative efforts to preserve heritage buildings and Vedic literature in former French establishments in India has received popular appreciation among the Indian populace, and served to promote French technical expertise in restoration of monuments and documents. Indian heritage conservation societies rely heavily on technical assistance and documentary archives of the French Institute of Pondicherry for restoration projects.

France and India view each other as important partners in space technology and applications. Indian Space Research Organisation (ISRO) and its French counterpart Centre National de Etudes Spatiales (CNES) have a history of cooperation and collaboration spanning about four decades. Scientific community of both nations cooperate in joint radiation experiment, space components development and space education. ISRO Vikas rocket engine benefited from Indo-French scientific collaboration in France on the Viking 4A engine built by CNES/SEP.

The Indo-French Centre for Promotion of Advanced Research (CEFIPRA) is the nodal framework for promoting bilateral scientific cooperation in fundamental and applied research, frontier technologies and exchange of scientists and post doctoral researchers. The office of CEFIPRA has been established in Delhi and the centre is currently funded through an annual corpus of €3 million with India and France equally contributing €1.5 million each. CEFIPRA completed 25 years in 2012. The 25th Anniversary Celebrations of CEFIPRA were formally launched in a programme organised in New Delhi on 6 March 2012. As part of the Silver Jubilee celebrations, a number of programmes have been envisaged; these include holding of seminars, organising science quiz in schools and screening of documentary films.

French authorities have provided land for extending the Maison de l‘Inde in France, which will contribute to augmenting accommodation facilities for Indian students in Paris.

Bharat Innovates, a programme to showcase Indian innovations, was jointly inaugurated by India and France in June 2026. The first event brought together some 120 Indian startups and about 19 agreements were signed between the entities from the innovation ecosystems of both the countries.

== Cultural exchanges ==
Indian culture enjoys a widespread appreciation among the French populace, as evident by the frequent and diverse cultural events organised across France, spanning the entire gamut of Indian art, music, dance, cinema and literature. While the Indian Council for Cultural Relations (ICCR) sponsors visits of Indian artists to France, and promotes cultural and artistic exchanges, there is a growing number of private impresarios who organise cultural events throughout France. Numerous Indian artists regularly perform in France, either commercially or through collaborations with local cultural associations. The Indo-French Cultural Exchange Programme (CEP) provides the overall umbrella for the organisation of a variety of cultural programmes. The 16th session of the Joint Commission on Culture which reviews the CEP was held on 29 September 2009, in New Delhi. In 2026, an ICCR Chair on "AI, Innovation and Culture" at Universite Paris-Saclay was established.

The Institut français en Inde is active in Delhi.

=== Namaste France ===
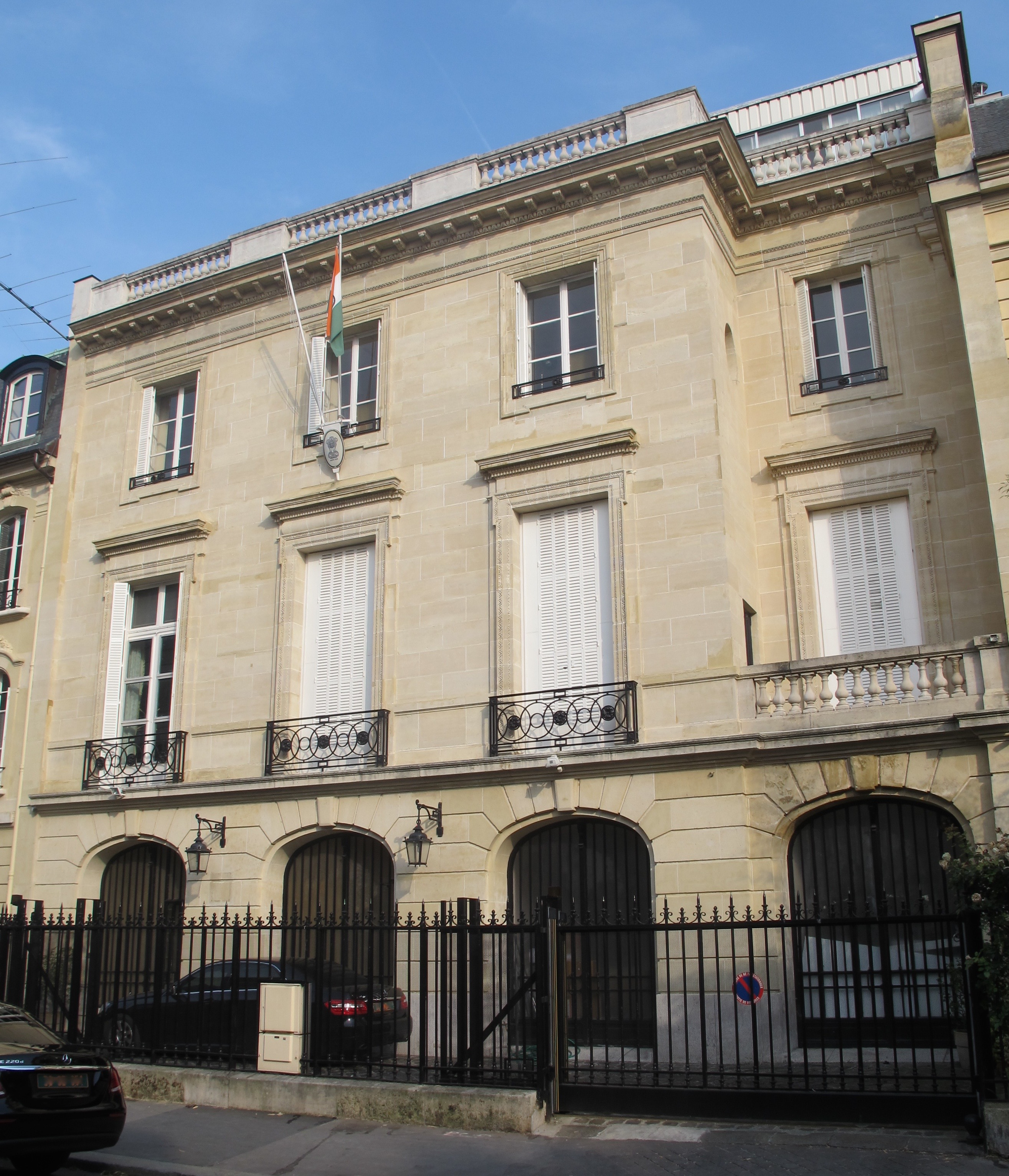
Embassy of India in Paris

The 15-month-long Indian cultural festival Namaste France was held from 14 April 2010 to 28 June 2011. It was successful in putting India on the cultural radar of France. Namaste France was a comprehensive presentation of Indian culture, which included art, music, dance, fashion, tourism, films, literature, and also business and education in both its traditional and contemporary forms.

The Namaste France Festival was organised in relation to Bonjour India, a similar French cultural festival, organised by the French Embassy in India in 2009–2010. During the visit of Hon’ble Minister of Culture, Housing, and Urban Poverty Alleviation, Kumari Selja to Paris to inaugurate the exhibition "The Last Harvest – Paintings of Tagore" at the prestigious Petit Palais museum from 26 January to 11 March 2012, a Declaration of Intent was signed with her French counterpart for further reinforcing cultural cooperation on 26 January 2012. On the same day, a Memorandum of Understanding (MOU) was signed between the Ministry of Culture of India and the Louvre Museum, with the aim of establishing an active partnership in the area of exchange of competencies and expertise, particularly in the field of museology, temporary exhibitions and other cultural events.

The 2012 Cannes Film Festival was important for India. For the first time, four Indian films were selected for screening in different categories of the festival namely Miss Lovely, Kalpana, Peddlers and Gangs of Wasseypur. India celebrated 100 years of Indian cinema in 2013. The Cannes Festival (15–26 May 2013), the Vesoul International Film Festival of Asian Cinema (Festival international des cinémas d'Asie) from 5–12 February 2013, and the 35th International Short Film Festival of Clermont-Ferrand (1–9 February 2013) have confirmed India as a "Country of Honour" in 2013 to celebrate the Centenary of the Indian Film Industry.

=== Bonjour India ===
In 1985, Indian performers were cheered at the Trocadero Alley in Paris, and in 1989 French artists enchanted audiences at Marine Drive in Mumbai. Two decades later, Bonjour India returned with renewed vigour in 2009, and by 2013 it grew into more collaborations. Scaling up in its third edition, Bonjour India 2017–18 was a four-month-long mega voyage across India that celebrated Indo-French partnership, while shaping the future of cultural exchange between the two countries. From November 2017 to February 2018, Bonjour India covered around a 100 programmes and projects in over 30 cities across 20 states and union territories. Bonjour India provides a platform for enduring partnerships, highlighting Indo-French innovation and creativity across the themes of Smart Citizen, High Mobility, and Go Green.

== Diaspora ==
=== Indian community in France ===
According to statistics published by the Indian Embassy in Paris, the Indian community including NRIs in France is estimated to be around 106,000, largely originating from Puducherry, Karaikal, Yanam, Mahé and Chandranagar. There are large communities of PIOs in overseas territories/departments of France: Reunion Island (about 250,000), Guadeloupe (about 57,000), Martinique (about 6,000) and St. Martin (about 300).

Indians living in France have access to French social security protection and services through an agreement concluded in 2008.

=== French community in India ===
The French in India are predominantly the remnants of the French presence in India, which began in 1673 with the establishment of French India and continued until 1962 when the French territory was formally transferred to India. The French presence was minor compared to the British and was generally ignored.

There were 12,864 French nationals residing in India in 1988. Nearly all are in the Union Territory of Puducherry in south-eastern India (11,726 individuals in 1988), with much smaller numbers in Karaikal (695 individuals), Mahé (50), Yanam (46), and 342 elsewhere in India.

Economic migration from France has resulted in the rise of skilled French expatriates in the urban population centres of Bangalore, Chennai, Hyderabad, Pune, Mumbai and New Delhi.

The French government had undertaken steps to strengthen Franco-Indian institutional and people-to-people ties.

== Franco-Pondichérien(s) ==
Franco-Pondichérien or simply Pondichérien is a term given to French citizens of Indian or mixed Creole ethnicity who continue to reside in Puducherry, and who can trace their nationality to the French colonial period. Franco-Pondichériens constitute less than 2% of the present population of Puducherry. Their presence can be termed as ranging from 'ignored' to 'tolerated'. Franco-Pondichériens are socially regarded as foreigners in India. In France, Franco-Pondichériens face racial profiling and discrimination, due to their South Asian or Mixed-race ethnicity, and are perceived either as second-class citizens or economic immigrants.

Franco-Pondichériens are customarily allowed access to Indian schools and universities on par with Non-Resident Indians (NRI). India's tourism boom has turned Pondicherry into a popular travel destination and slowed the population decline of Franco-Pondichériens who find more business and work opportunities locally than having to repatriate to Europe.

Indian Citizenship Act of the Constitution of India forbids dual nationality. It is illegal to concurrently possess an Indian passport and foreign nationality and/or passport. Foreigners who possess Overseas Citizenship of India (OCI) continue to benefit consular protection from their country of nationality. Franco-Pondichériens who have served in the French armed services are disqualified from OCI: "foreign military personnel either in service or retired are not entitled for grant of OCI". Whereas OCI eligibility regarding conscripts who have undergone the mandatory military service or Journée défense et citoyenneté is unclear, Franco-Pondichériens enjoy treaty rights to visit India as guaranteed through Article IX of the 1956 Treaty establishing De Jure Cession of French Establishments in India: "French civil servants, magistrates and military personnel born in the Establishments or keeping there family links shall be permitted to return freely to the Establishments on leave or on retirement."

In February 2015, Indo-French Senior Citizens Association staged street-protests in Pondicherry to protest against denial of the French nationality and voting rights derived from the 1956 Treaty establishing De Jure Cession of French Establishments in India. The 1956 treaty binds the Government of France to recognize French citizenship for individuals whose birth and nativity certificate had been registered during the French India regime.

In June 2015, locally employed contractual staff at the French Consulate in Pondicherry stopped work to protest against wage discrimination.

== Perceptions ==
Social studies conducted by French researchers are prone to emphasise on the lacunae of India's economy rather than achievements and improvements in the sphere of poverty reduction, health-care and education among others. French media portray India in an unfavourable light by focussing principally on events connected to crimes, corruption, inequalities, poverty, ethnic and religious strife, and so on.

The morbid fascination of European tourists with Hindu cremation rituals is perceived as lack of sensitivity besides being a gross invasion of privacy. Hordes of tourists flock to cremation grounds on the banks of the Ganges, especially in Varanasi (Bénarès), to photograph funeral pyres.

=== BBC World Service country rating poll data for France and India ===
According to a 2014 BBC World Service Poll, 35% of Indians view France's influence positively, 40% neutral and 25% expressing a negative view, while 61% of the French view India's influence positively, 11% neutral and 28% expressing a negative view.

== See also ==
- French India
- Compagnie des Indes
- Foreign relations of France
- Foreign relations of India
- Indian diaspora in France
- French people in India
- Institut français en Inde
- French Institute of Pondicherry
- India–European Union relations
