= French Institute of Pondicherry =

Research center in India

Coordinates: 11°56′13″N 79°50′10″E

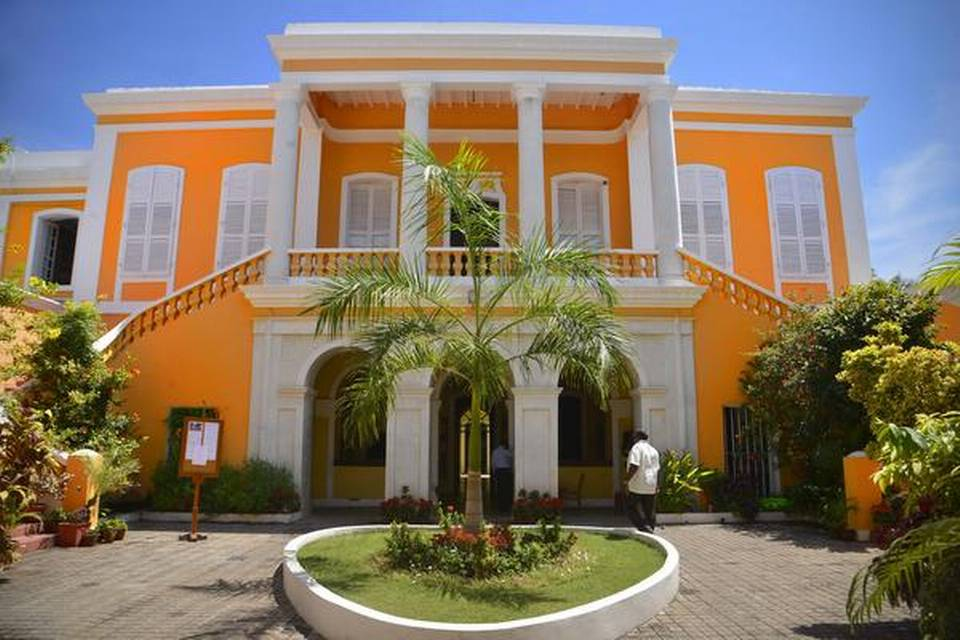
- Type: French Research Institute
- Established: 21 March 1955
- Director: Dr. Renaud Colson
- Location: Pondicherry, Puducherry, India
- Campus: Urban
- Website: French Institute of Pondicherry

The French Institute of Pondicherry (French: Institut français de Pondichéry) is a public institution under the joint supervision of the French Ministry of Foreign Affairs and the National Center for Scientific Research (UMIFRE 21 CNRS-MEAE). Together with the Centre de Sciences humaines (CSH) in New Delhi, it forms the CNRS's “Savoirs et Mondes indiens” Research Support Unit (USR 3330). Under the terms of Article 24 of the Treaty of Cession of the French Settlements of Pondicherry, Karaikal, Mahé, and Yanaon signed on May 28, 1956, “the French Institute of Pondicherry, created by agreement between the two governments since the agreement of October 21, 1954, and inaugurated on March 21, 1955, shall be maintained as an institution of research”. As a tool of French scientific diplomacy, it contributes to the study of Indian society and the preservation of India's cultural and natural heritage: in 2005, the IFP's collection of Shaivite manuscripts was included in UNESCO's “Memory of the World” program. It consists of four departments (Indology, Ecology, Social Sciences, and Geomatics) and a library, and houses several scientific collections.

== History ==
Established under the terms of the Treaty of Cession of French Territories in India, the French Institute of Pondicherry was inaugurated on 21 March, 1955 under the name "Institut Français d'Indologie".) It was engaged, under the leadership of its first director (Jean Filliozat), in the study of Indian civilization and culture, and more particularly in the history and the religions of South India.

This culture had to be replaced in its natural environment – at least that was what Nehru encouraged the IFP to implement. Hence a department of Ecology was created to collect information on the conditions and evolution of the environment in South India (vegetation, soils, climate changes, etc.) with its focus on the Western Ghats, one of the world's 34 hotspots for biodiversity.

With the setting up of the department of Social Sciences in 1988, the institute extended its interest to the evolution and dynamics of the Indian society.

The Laboratory of Applied Informatics and Geomatics (LAIG) was set up in the 1990s. In 2017 it became the department GeoSMIT (GeoSpatial Monitoring and Information Technology).

The institute has a library with 70,000 books and more than 120 journals currently received. It is open to the public (catalogue on line).

== Fields of research ==
- The IFP is composed of four departments. Yet two keywords group the main part of their research objects: "heritage" and "environment". Heritage, because of the many collections, quite unique (8,400 UNESCO-registered manuscripts, 15,500 species of pollen, 24,000 pages of herbarium, 130,000 photographs catalogued in the photo library ...). But also because of the publications of the IFP (critical editions of Sanskrit texts), and especially its research, dealing with religious rites as well as sacred groves or urban heritage policies. Environment, because this term encompasses very close issues addressed by the IFP, in terms of health and nutrition, Ayurvedic and siddha medicine, forest ecology, biodiversity conservation, climate change, or management of irrigation water.

== Research departments ==
- The Department of Indology (historical department) focuses its attention on classical India, namely its religions, its literature, its languages (contemporary Tamil, Sanskrit, etc.) to better interpret and study the foundations of modern India.
- The Department of Social Sciences promotes research on the "emerging India": social management of water, urban development, demography and social mobility, microfinance and indebtedness, "traditional" and "modern" health care systems, urban planning, agroecology, etc.
- The Department of Ecology concentrates its research on biodiversity and notably on the functioning of fragile ecosystems (forests, mangroves, littoral, etc.), by considering man as an important parameter in their evolution. It conducts research that aims to understand and evaluate the biological diversity of natural ecosystems as well as those affected by human impact. This research activity has the related aim of contributing to the establishment of schemes for conservation and sustainable management of natural resources. The high priority accorded to research on paleo-environments has yielded a rich and varied collection of pollen.
- The research conducted at GeoSMIT is both methodological (development of new approaches in remote sensing and computer sciences) and thematic (study of a vegetal or human environment through satellite observation, development of an interactive portal, methods for the analysis of regional biodiversity...).
- Transversal, interdisciplinary programmes have been launched to break the boundaries of these departments: Coast, Labour, Forest and Water.

== Missions ==
RESEARCH: field work and data collection, organization of scientific events, response to calls for projects, publication of books and academic articles... TRAINING: receiving students on internship, master, doctoral and post-doctoral students from France and other countries.

EXPERTISE: manuscript analysis, pollen study for archaeology, Smart Cities project of the Government of Puducherry, collaboration with the Agence Française de Développement... This last mission is growing. More generally, IFP is open to any partnership with companies, foundations and other organizations: sponsorship, research collaborations or expertise – financing projects, PhDs, chairs, etc.

== Support structures for research ==
- The library: Its collection (on line catalogue) comprises 70,000 books and 800 journals, of which 140 are regularly subscribed; library open to all.
  - 8500 palm-leaf manuscripts (the largest collection of texts on Saivasiddhanta in the world, registered as such in the "Memory of the World" register of the UNESCO). IFP is regarded as a "Manuscript Resource Centre" by the National Mission for Manuscripts of the Government of India); 1144 transcripts, many of them being published with critical edition (see below).
  - A collection of 140,000 photographs, of temples and edifices in South India notably. The international police is making use of it for tracking stolen statues. Another collection is being built, on the history of family photography in Tamil Nadu (programme STARS).
  - Pollen slide collection (Dr. Thanikaimoni pollen reference slide collection): 22,000 slides in 15,000 tropical plant species.
  - The Herbarium houses nearly 23,000 specimens.
  - Nearly 3,000 maps on India and South and Southeast Asia, around 1,200 topographic maps (1 inch : 1 mile) dating from the first half of the 20th century and an equal number of topographic maps at the metric scale (most of them 1:50,000 and nearly 200 sheets at 1:250,000) obtained from the Survey of India and covering most of the Indian subcontinent. Around 500 thematic maps of other South and Southeast Asian countries (vegetation, soil, geology, meteorology, etc.) at highly varying scales, mainly from the 1950s, are preserved.

== Publications ==
The IFP's research results are circulated in publications:

. In international peer-reviewed journals;

. By the institute itself: book series (Indology, jointly with EFEO) and multimedia CD-ROMs....

. The IFP is developing portals (Biodiversity India Portal) and apps for a large audience (Pondicherry Past and Present). They are often based on the principle of interactive "citizen science".

. The institute publishes a news bulletin Pattrika in collaboration with the CSH in Delhi and the EFEO (two issues per year). Its Newsletter appears bimonthly.

. The institute organizes events that are of international academic level but are also suitable for the general public (Pondicherry Heritage Festival).

== The manuscripts ==
With respect to its branch of research in Indology, the French Institute of Pondicherry has a collection of 8,600 Hindu religious manuscripts and similar records, forming part of India's National Mission for Manuscripts. Comprising 8,187 ancient palm-leaf bundles, 360 paper codices and 1,144 recent paper transcripts, it is the largest collection of manuscripts primarily transmitting texts of the Saiva Siddhanta tradition of Hinduism.

The collection was started in 1955 by the institute's founder-director, Jean Filliozat, who desired to explain the Hindu temple and what happens in it. The manuscripts were gathered from collections of temples, priests and monasteries across South India and brought to the institute with the intention of preserving, transcribing and translating them. Four volumes of a catalogue describing in detail the contents of 4,000 texts transmitted in 475 of the palm-leaf bundles were published in 1986, 1987, 1990 and 2002. Cataloguing has continued using flatbed scanning and digital photography technology in conjunction with a computerized database.

=== Contents of the collection ===
- Canonical texts of Saivism (Saiva Agamas, also known as Tantras): 1,900 codices
- Mantra/ritual manuals: 1,890
- Devotional hymns and legends of holy places (stotra/mahatmya): 1,360
- Hindu astrology (Jyotisha): 435
- The literary epic about Rama (Ramayana): 192
- Other Sanskrit epics, myths and legends (Puranas): 230
- Traditional South Indian medicine: 198
- Vedas: 187
- Literary works in Sanskrit: 160
- Tamil devotional literature: 1,350

=== Recognition ===
The collection was registered in UNESCO's World Memories in July 2005 and has been declared a national treasure of India by the Indian government. The institute was declared a "Manuscript Resource Centre" in 2004.

== Personnel ==
The personnel of the IFP consists of about 70 staff:

- Expatriate personnel on temporary assignment from the French Ministry of Foreign Affairs or CNRS, as well as from other French or foreign institutions
- Indian researchers
- Research assistants (engineers and technicians)
- Administrative and service personnel (archivists, secretariat, maintenance personnel)

The institute welcomes researchers and research assistants on project contract and financed by outside sources, as well as experienced researchers and students of all nationalities associated with the projects of the institute and carrying out resident study.

== Partnership agreements ==
- Partnerships with major French research institutions such as the CIRAD, EFEO, INALCO, IRD and EHESS, as well as French local authorities such as Centre-Val de Loire region, etc.
  - Several Memoranda of Agreement with academic institutions including the Universities of Toronto, Eastern University (Sri Lanka), Bordeaux, Vedic University (Tirupati), Manipal... Tripartite Memoranda of Understanding associating the IFP and Pondicherry University with the universities of Limoges or Bordeaux 3 facilitate student exchanges between India and France.

== Budget ==
Half of the budget comes from grants from the IFP's supervisory authorities. The rest comes from external sources: European and French public funds, international funds (British Library, National Gallery of Australia, etc.), but also Indian sources (Rashtriya Samskrit Sansthan, MoEF...). Private funding is also increasing (e.g. Jain and Chettiar foundations).

== The premises ==
- A colonial building by the sea.
  - A usable area of 3,000 square metres (32,000 sq ft) and spaces available for rent to use in hosting events, along with an equipped conference room, garden, and terrace.

== See also ==
- Institut français en Inde
- Dr. Ganapathi Thanikaimoni
- France–India relations
- Sripuranthan Natarajan Idol
- Lycée français de Pondichéry
- Veerateeswarar Temple, Korukkai § Idol Theft
