= André Julien =

André Julien may refer to:

- André Julien Chainat (1892–1961), French World War I flying ace
- André Julien, Comte Dupuy (1753–?), Governor General of French India, 1816–1825

== See also ==
- André Jullien (1766–1832), French wine writer
- André-Damien-Ferdinand Jullien (1882–1964), French cardinal
