= Jean Filliozat =

French scholar

- Born: 4 November 1906; Paris
- Died: 27 October 1982 (aged 75)
- Writing career
- Subjects: Indology, Medicine

Jean Filliozat (4 November 1906 in Paris – 27 October 1982 in Paris) was a French writer. He studied medicine and was a physician between 1930 and 1947. He learned Sanskrit, Pali, Tibetan and Tamil. He wrote some important works on the history of Indian medicine. He taught at Collège de France from 1952 to 1978.

== Biography ==
Jean Filliozat became a medical doctor in 1930, and was awarded a diploma from the École pratique des hautes études in 1934. In 1935 he was awarded a diploma by the Institut national des langues et civilisations orientales. He was director of studies at the École pratique des hautes études from 1941 to 1978. He established the Institut Français d'Indologie at Pondicherry in 1955 and was at the same time director of the École Française d'Extrême Orient from 1956 until 1977. He became a member of the Academie in 1966 and vice president of the Societe Asiatique in 1974.

He was a member of the Legion d'honneur.

== Works ==
- Magie et médecine, Paris, P.U.F., 1943, vil-147 p. (Collection mythes et Religions).
- Fragments de textes koutchéens de médecine et de magie, Paris, Adrien Maisonneuve, 1948, 157 p., 8 pl.h.t.
- La Doctrine classique de la médecine indienne. Ses origines et ses parallèles grecs, Paris, Imprimerie Nationale, 1949 (2e édition, Paris, Ecole Française d'Extrême-Orient, 1975). English translation: The classical Doctrine of Indian medicine. Its origins and its Greek parallels. Translated from the original in French by Dev Raj Chanana, New Delhi, Munshiram Manoharlal, 1964.
- Yogasataka. Texte médical attribué à Nagarjuna. Textes sanskrit et tibétain, traduction française, notes, indices, Pondicherry: Institut Français d'Indologis, 1979, XL-207 p.
- (en coll. avec L. Renou et al.), L'Inde classique. Manuel des études indiennes, t. 1, Paris, Payot, 1949; t. 2, Paris, EFEO, 1953, [réimpr. régulièrement].
- Studies in Asokan Inscriptions, translated by R. K. Menon, Calcutta, Indian Studies Past and Present. 1967
- Un texte de la religion kaumâra. Le Tirumurukârrupatai, Pondicherry: Institut français d'indologie (PIFI, 49).1973
- (en coll. avec J. André), L'Inde vue de Rome. Textes latins de l'antiquité relatifs à l'Inde, textes, trad. et comm., Paris, Les Belles Lettres. 1986
- Religion, Philosophy, Yoga: A Selection of Articles
