= Ganapathi Thanikaimoni =

Indian botanist and palynologist (1938–1986)

- Born: 1 January 1938; Madras, British India
- Died: 5 September 1986 (age 48); Karachi, Pakistan
- Other name: Thani
- Occupation: Botanist
- Known for: Contributions to the science of palynology

Ganapathi Thanikaimoni (1 January 1938 – 5 September 1986), often referred to as Thanikaimoni, was an Indian palynologist.

== Early life and education ==
Born on New Year's Day, 1938 in Madras, India, Thani received the Master of Science degree in botany in 1962 at the Presidency College, Madras under the direction of the plant morphologist, Professor B.G.L. Swamy. At the same time Thani was awarded the Fyson Prize in Natural Science, which is reserved for outstanding Indian naturalists.

In 1970 Thani was granted a doctorate degree by the university of Montpellier. His thesis was on the pollen morphology, classification and phylogeny of 800 species of extant Palmae (Arecaceae).

== Scientific career ==
Thani took a position of scientist in the newly founded (1960) Palynology Laboratory of the French Institute of Pondicherry (French: Institut Français de Pondichéry) under the direction of Dr. Prof. Guinet. In a few years Thani's scientific and administrative abilities were recognized by his promotion to the directorship of the laboratory.

During the next decade he published numerous significant papers concerning such essentially tropical families as the Araceae, Clusiaceae, Menispermaceae, Mimosaceae and Sonnera tiaceae [see Palynos 8(2): 7, Dec 1985]. In the majority of these publications, he gave a complete and accurate description of the pollen morphology of the species and included the morphology of the other plant organs, to elucidate their probable phylogeny and to justify the classification schemes selected.

Although the bulk of Thani's early research dealt with pollen of modern flora, in the late 1970s turned his attention to fossil pollen as well. Thani was invited to conduct a palynological investigation of the Borobudur monument by the Indonesian government and École française d'Extrême-Orient (EFEO). The palynological analysis and study helped identify six phases in the history of the UNESCO World Heritage Site spanning 600AD to 1900AD.

In 1983 he convened a workshop for French and Indian palynologists in Pondicherry with the goal of clarifying the taxonomy of angiosperm pollen previously described from tertiary horizons of tropical Africa and India. For this project Thani's collection of more than 20,000 slides of tropical palynomorphs was of inestimable value. From this cooperative endeavor, a clear synthesis of 47 taxa was obtained and published. Furthermore, he had recently been active in organizing a symposium on tertiary pollen from tropical regions for the 7th IPC in Brisbane, Australia.

In recognition of his contributions in the fields of botany, palynology and paleoenvironmental studies, Dr. Thanikaimoni was elected a Fellow of the Linnean Society of London.

== Environmental protection ==
As knowledge of the significant role that mangrove ecosystems play in the tropical coastal zone grew worldwide, it became clear that mangroves are marginal ecosystems, vulnerable to sudden or drastic changes in the environment. Mangroves do not recover spontaneously after the impact of natural or man-made catastrophic events such as cyclones or felling of the mangrove forests.

In Puducherry, he advised the government on matters pertaining to the protection of the coastline, rehabilitation of arid areas and the impact of human development on the local ecosystem.

Thani was instrumental in focusing attention to the tremendous ecological role that the mangrove ecosystem played in protecting coastlines from tidal waves (tsunami) and land erosion. He spearheaded scientific initiatives centered around the mangrove ecosystem at Pichavaram.

He was involved in UNESCO's Asia and Pacific Mangrove Project—a multidisciplinary integrated initiative for a better understanding of the structure and function of mangrove ecosystems for sustainable use and management.

Thani's scientific contribution in the realm of mangrove ecology are recorded in the posthumously published Palynology Manual. He left behind first-class work that is a benchmark for the identification of pollen from species of mangrove plants of ages past.

== Death ==
Thani was on his way to the US when the airplane in which he was flying, Pan Am Flight 73, was hijacked in Karachi, Pakistan on 5 September 1986. Thani sustained fatal injuries to the head in the gun-battle which followed an attempt by Pakistani commandos to storm the aircraft and kill the terrorists. It was reported that he was trying to extend help to a child when he was struck by bullets and shrapnel from an exploding grenade carried by the terrorists.

He had been invited to present a lecture at a symposium on marine palynology, as a part of the UNESCO-sponsored Second International Conference on Paleo-oceanography that was held 6–12 September at the Woods Hole Oceanographic Institution in Massachusetts, USA.

== Legacy ==
The 22,000 pollen slide collection of the French Institute of Pondicherry was named the Dr. Thanikaimoni pollen reference slide collection as a tribute to Dr. G. Thanikaimoni during the 50th anniversary celebration of the palynology laboratory in 2010.

Tertiary spores and pollen named after Thanikaimoni:

- Retimonocolpites thanikaimonii (Tarkeshwar Formation, Rajpardi, Cambay Basin, Gujarat, India)
- Spinizonocolpites thanikaimonii (Tarkeshwar Formation, Rajpardi, Cambay Basin, Gujarat, India)
- Warkallopollenites thanikaimonii (Cliff Section, Warkalli Formation, Varkala, Kerala, India)

== Bibliography ==
- Contribution to the pollen morphology of Eriocaulaceae. Pollen Spores 7: 181–191. 1965.
- Pollen morphology of the genus Utricularia. Pollen Spores 8: 265–284. 1966.
- Contribution a l'etude palynologique des Palmiers. Institut Français de Pondichéry, Tray. Sect. Sci. Tech. (2): 1-92. 1966.
- Pollen morphology of Sonneratiaceae. Institut Français de Pondichéry, Trciv. Sect. Sci. Tech. 5(2): 1–12. 1966 (with DMA. Jayaweera).
- Morphologie des pollens des Menispermacees. Institut Français de Pondichéry, Trciv. Sect. Sci. Tech. 5(4): 1-57. 1968.
- Esquisse palynologique des Aracees. Institut Français de Pondichéry, Tray. Sect. Sci. Tech. 5(5): 1-31. 1969.
- Les Palmiers: palynologie et systematique. Institut Français de Pondichéry, Tray. Sect. Sci. Tech. 11: 1–286. 1970. (from his D.Sc. thesis at the Univ. of Montpellier).
- Pollen morphology, classification and phylogeny of Palmae. Ada nsonici 10: 347–365. 1970.
- Bomarea lyncina Mirb. (Amaryllidaceae) and Auriculiidites Elsik. Pollen Spores 12(2): 177–180. 1970. (with W.C. Elsik).
- Quelques resultats d'analyses polliniques sur les Nilgiri. Institut Français de Pondichéry, Tray. Sect. Sci. Tech. 10: 127–139. 1971.
- Palynology in Pondicherry. J. Palynol. 8: 156–162. 1972. (with P. Legris).
- Pollen morphologie. Pp. 1–63 IN: Revision du Arophyteae (Araceae) (J. Bogner, ed). Bot. Jahrb. Syst. 92: 1972. (with F. Blasco).
- Sarraceniaceae: palynology and systematics. Pollen Spores 14: 143–155. 1972. (with C. Vasanthy).
- Index bibliographique sur la morphologie des pollens d'Angiospermes. Institut Français de Pondichéry, Tray. Sect. Sci. Tech. 12 et seq. Five volumes. 1972–1986.
- Relation between the pollen spectra and the vegetation of a south Indian mangrove. Pollen Spores 15: 281–292, 1973. (with C. Caratini and F. Blasco).
- Late Quaternary vegetational history of the southern region. Pp. 632–643 IN: Aspects and appraisal of Indian palaeobotany (K. Surange et al., eds.) B. Sahni Inst. Palaeobot., Lucknow. 1974. (with F. Blasco).
- Pollen analysis. Pp. 37–54 IN: Laang Spean and the prehistory of Cambodia by R. Mourer. Modern Quaternary Research in S.E. Asia. 1977.
- L'analyse pollinique de debris archeologiques du Borobudur. Mern. Archeol. E.F.E.O., Paris 12: 69–72. 1977.
- Pollen morphological terms; proposed definitions. Proc. IVint. Palynol. Conf., Lucknow 1: 223–239. 1978.
- Principal works on the pollen morphology of the Compositae. Pp. 249–265 IN: The biology and chemistry of the Compositae (V.H. Hay-wood et al., eds.) Academic Press, New York. 1977.
- Mangroves of India: palynological study and recent history of the vegetation. Proc. IV Jut. Palynol. Conf., Lucknow 3: 49–59. 1978. (with C. Caratini and C. Tissot).
- Index palynologius. Proc. IV Jut. Palynol. Conf., Lucknow 3: 344–348. 1978.
- Pollen morphology of primitive angiosperms: some neglected aspects. Proc. IV Int. Palynol. Conf., Lucknow 1: 542–545. 1978. (with F. RolandHeydacker).
- Morphological index to Van Campo's African pollen atlas. Bull. Inst. Foudam. Afr. Noire 41A: 286–299. 1979. (with C. Vibichanaraw).
- Palynological investigation on the Borobudur monument. Bull. E.F.E.O. 72: 237–250. 1983.
- Palynological report on the Satingpra (Thailand) samples. In Satingpra. I. The environmental and economic archaeology of South Thailand, J. STARGARDT. British Archaeological Research International Series no 158. Oxford, 1983.
- Menispermacees: palynologie et systematique. Institut Français de Pondichéry, Trav. Sect. Sci. Tech. 13: 1–135. 1984. (with F. Roland, 1K. Ferguson, M.T. Cerceau & L. Derouet).
- Principal works on the pollen morphology of Myrtales. Ann. Mo. Bot. Card. 71(3): 970–985. 1984.
- Omniaperaturate Euphorbiaceae pollen with striate spines. Bull. lard. But. Ncitl. Belg. 54 (1/2): 105–125. 1984. (with C. Caratini, S. Nilsson & E. Grafstrom).
- Selected Tertiary Angiosperm pollens from India and their relationship with African Tertiary pollens. - Trav. Sect. Sci. Tech., Institut Français de Pondichéry 19:93 pp. 72 pl. 1 map. 1984 (with C. Caratini, B.S. Venkatachala, C.G.K. Ramanujam & R.K. Kar (ed.))
- Palynology and phylogeny. Bibl. Bot., Stuttgart, 137: 11–14. 1985.
- Pollen apertures: form and function. Pp. 119–136 IN: Pollen and Spores; Form and Function (Black-more & Ferguson, eds.). Academic Press, London. 1985.
- Pollens d'Angiospermes du Tertiaire de I'Inde et leurs relations avec les pollens du Tertiaire d'Afrique. Institut Français de Pondichéry, Trav. Sect. Sci. Tech. 19: (in press with multiple authors).
- Variation de l'aperture des Annonacees: tendances palynologiques nouvelles. IXe Symposium A.P.L.F., Montpellier, October 1985. Mciii. E.P.H.E. Montpellier (In press, with A. Le Thomas).
- Mangrove Palynology. Pondichéry : Institut Français de Pondichéry, 1987.
