= Arques-la-Bataille British Cemetery =

Military cemetery in Arques-la-Bataille near Dieppe, France

Coordinates: 49.8882°N 1.1414°E

Details
- Country: France
- Type: Military cemetery
- Owned by: Commonwealth War Graves Commission
- No. of graves: 381

Arques-la-Bataille British Cemetery is a military cemetery in Arques-la-Bataille near Dieppe, France, that contains the graves of nearly 400 servicemen of the British Empire in the First World War. The cemetery is maintained by the Commonwealth War Graves Commission and was designed by John Reginald Truelove. Many of the soldiers buried there were members of the South African Native Labour Corps. The cemetery contains 381 graves, of which 378 have been identified.

== History ==
=== Design ===
In 1919, John Reginald Truelove was appointed as the Assistant Architect to the Imperial War Graves Commission, which is now the Commonwealth War Graves Commission. The British architect was born in 1886 and was formerly a captain in the London Regiment. He designed the Arques-la-Bataille British Cemetery along with several other cemeteries such as the Noyelles-sur-mer Chinese Cemetery.

=== SANLC Memorial ===
Located in the center of the cemetery is a memorial dedicated to all members of the South African Native Labour Corps, who occupy the majority of the cemetery. The memorial was designed by Arthur James Scott Hutton and features a Stone of Remembrance with a concave bronze medallion. Inscribed in the memorial, in English, Sesuto and Isixosa, are the words:

To the memory of those Natives of the South African Labour Corps who crossed the seas in response to the call of their great Chief, King George V, and laid down their lives in France, for the British Empire, during the Great War 1914–1918, this Memorial is erected by their comrades.

=== Visitors ===
The Arques-la-Bataille British Cemetery is open to the public every day. However, access can be difficult for those with mobility problems.
