= André Jullien =

French winemaker (1766–1832)

André Jullien (1766 at Chalon-sur-Saône, Saône-et-Loire – 1832 of cholera in Paris) was a French vintner and pioneering wine writer. Wine historian Hugh Johnson describes Jullien's work as "the foundation-stone of modern writing about wine".

== Vintner activities ==
At the age of around 30, Jullien moved to Paris and entered the wholesale wine trade. As a négociant he made several improvements to the practices of the wine trade; he invented an air tube to better being able to tap wine and a powder for clarification of wine. For this, he was awarded gold medals at various exhibitions and was supported by the minister Jean-Antoine Chaptal.

== Publications ==
Jullien initiated the ambitious project of describing all known wine regions and their wines, and in this he made a pioneering effort, as the professional wine literature was almost solely concerned with how to grow vines and make wine, and not with describing and comparing different wine regions. This took him on many a distant journey and the result was his Topographie de tous les vignobles connus, which was published in a first edition in 1816, and a second in 1822. An important feature of this work was his classification of all wines into five classes. An abridged edition translated into English was published in 1824 as "a manual and guide to all importers and purchasers in the choice of wines". The third and fourth French editions in 1832 incorporated many changes and were further expanded. This edition was awarded the French Academy of Sciences' Montyon prize for statistics in 1832. The final two editions were signed "corrected and augmented by C.E. Jullien" who was likely Jullien's son.

He also published a manual for sommeliers under the title Manuel du sommelier in 1822 and the technical publication Appareils perfectionnés propres à transvaser les vins et autres liqueurs avec ou sans communication avec l'air extérieur in 1832.

=== Wine writings ===
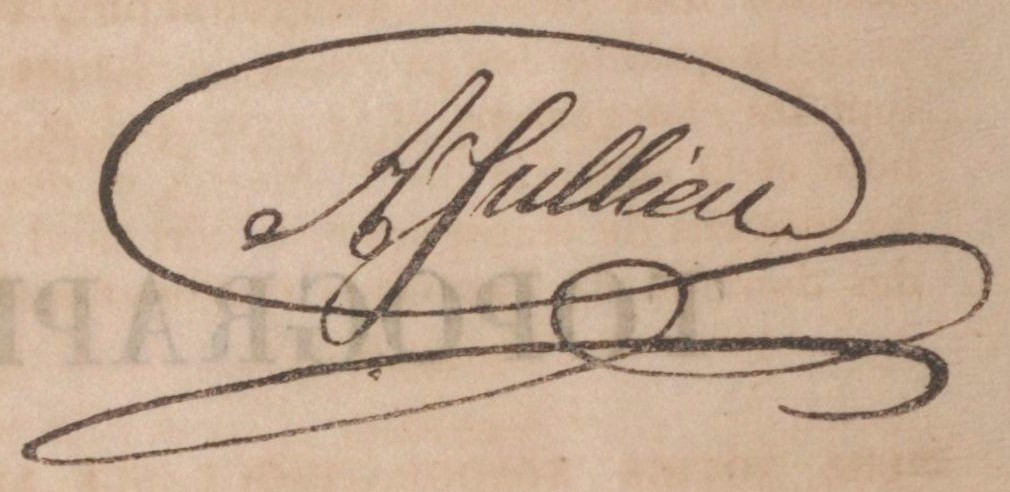
Signature of André Jullien

In his 1816 work, Topographie de tous les vignobles connus, Jullien created the most comprehensive cataloging of the world's wine region ever done up to that point. In addition to describing the well known European wine region, Jullien also described Cossack winemaking techniques used in Ekaterinoslav, wine styles of Hindu Kush and Astrakhan, and surveyed the vineyards of several islands in the Atlantic and Indian Oceans. On the islands of Madeira, he compared the dry wines made from Sercial to the great wines of the Rhine-a description that would support the apocryphal belief that the Madeira grape descended from the German wine grape variety Riesling. In Madeira, he also described unusual aging methods employed on the island, such as the tradition of burying oak barrels of wine in a pit for 6 months underneath layers of horse manure.

His writings on Bordeaux include one of the earliest classifications of the region's estate with Haut-Brion, Margaux, Latour and Lafite listed among the finest wine of the area. Nearly 40 years later, the official 1855 classification would closely mirror Jullien's rankings including all of the first growths. Traveling with the English wine writer Cyrus Redding in Germany, Jullien described the quality of German wines produced during the comet vintage of 1811.
