= Lycée français de Pondichéry =

Coordinates: 11.9305°N 79.8326°E

French International School Pondicherry
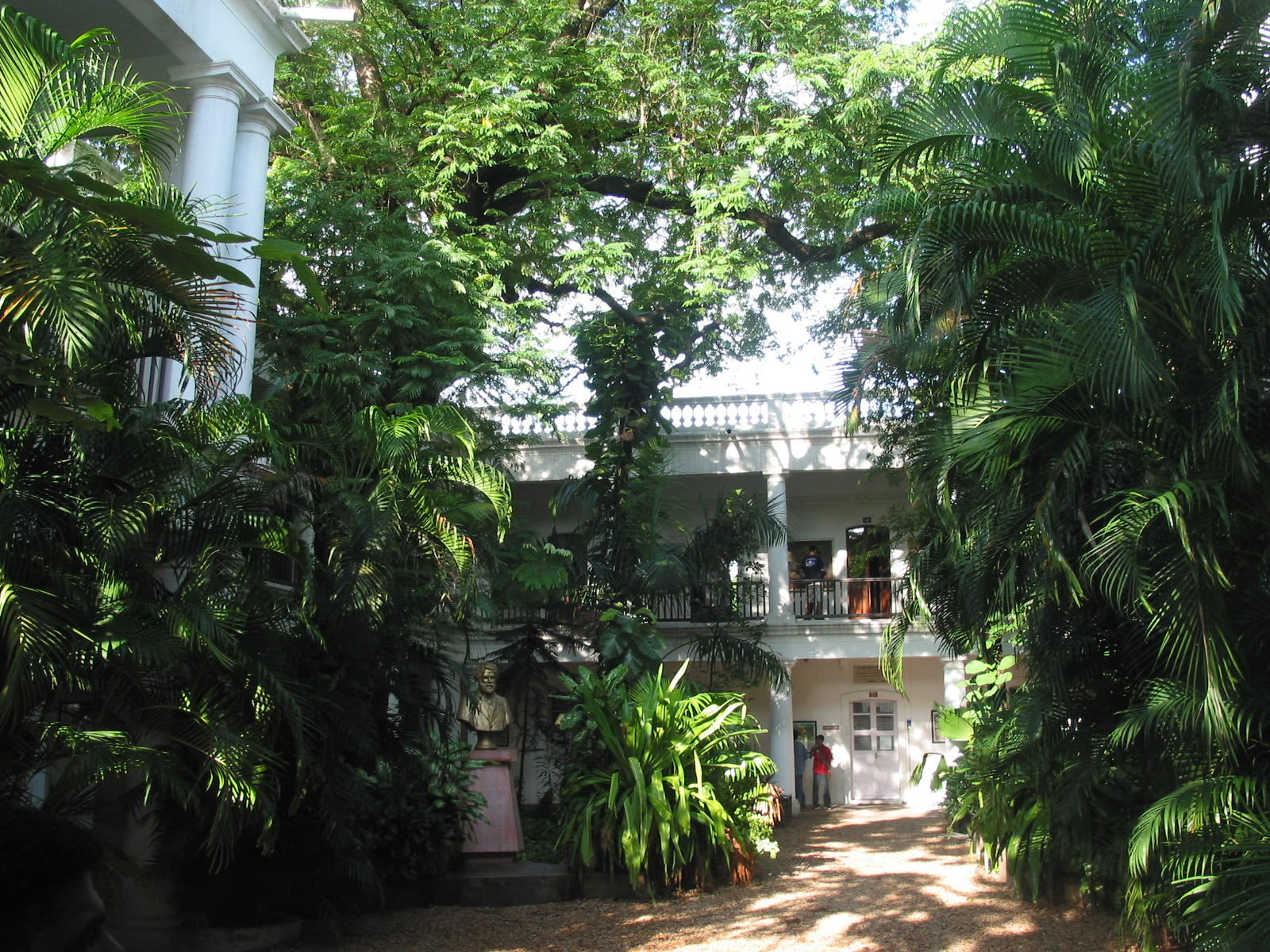
- Main courtyard
- 12 Rue Victor Simonel, Pondicherry, Puducherry, India

Information
- Type: Private
- Established: 1826; 200 years ago
- Principal: Brahim Oualli
- Grades: Class 1 – 12
- Enrollment: 550
- Campus size: 5 acres (20,000 m^{2})
- Affiliation: University of Rennes
- Website: www.lfpondichery.net

The Lycée français international de Pondichéry is an international French school in Pondicherry, Puducherry, India. The school provides education from pre-primary to lycée (senior high school), 3 to 18 years old.

It is directly operated by the Agency for French Education Abroad (AEFE), an agency of the French government. The school also is part of the AEFE network of 500 French high schools overseas.

It was established as the Collège Royal on 26 October 1826 by Eugène Desbassayns de Richemont, then Governor-General of Pondichéry in French India, during the Bourbon Restoration.

In 2014, the school signed a memorandum of understanding with the Future Foundation School in Kolkata providing for student exchanges.

== See also ==
- Agency for French Education Abroad
