= Kalmandapam =

- Village
- Location in Puducherry, India Kalmandapam (India)
- Coordinates: 11.870083°N 79.649142°E
- Country: India
- State: Puducherry
- District: Pondicherry
- Taluk: Bahour
- Commune: Nettapakkam

Languages
  - Official: French, Tamil, English
- Time zone: UTC+5:30 (IST)
- PIN: 605 106
- Telephone code: 0413
- Vehicle registration: PY-01
- Sex ratio: 50% ♂/♀

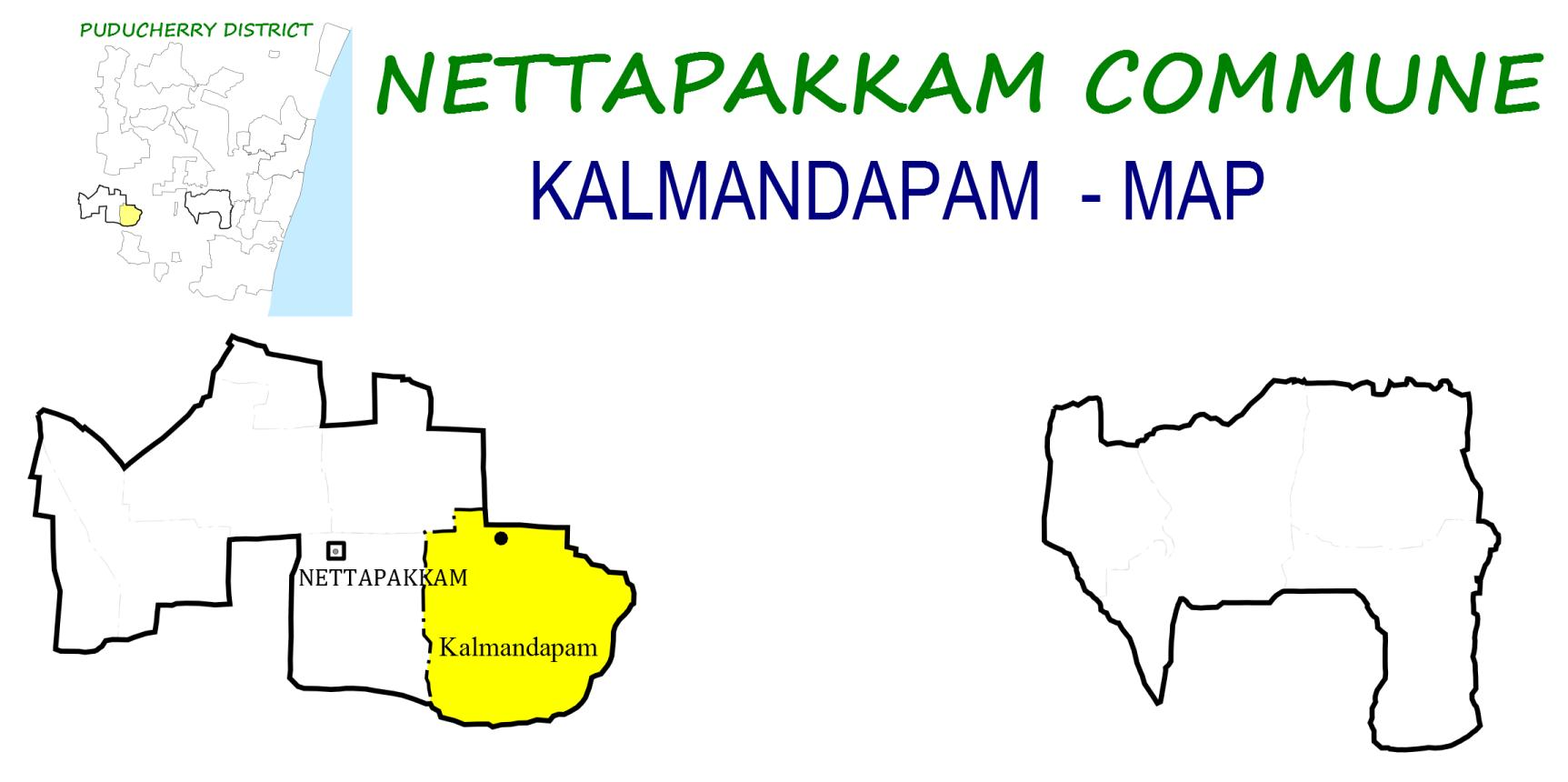
Kalmandapam, Nettapakkam Commune

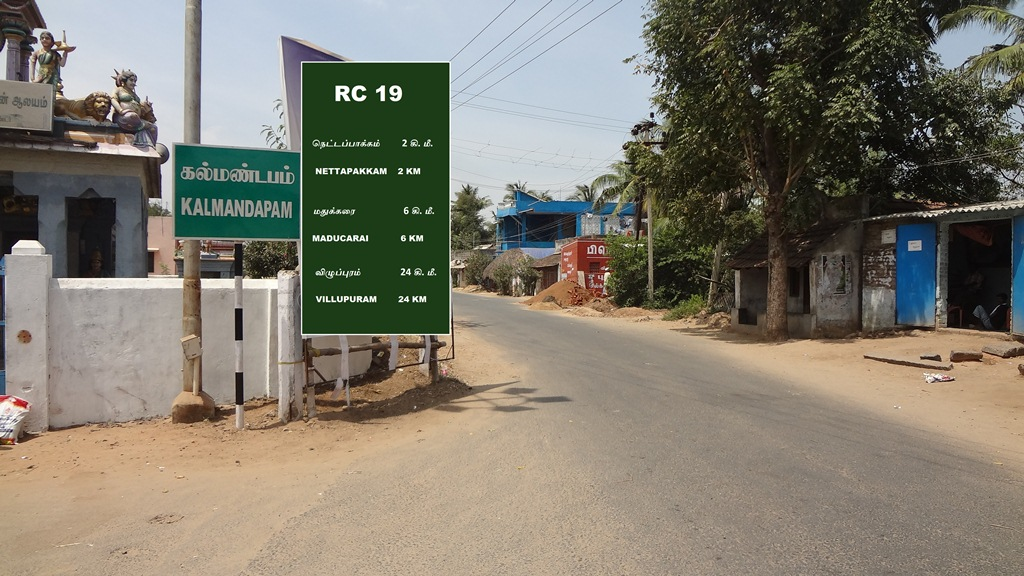
Kalmandapam

Kalmandapam is a panchayat village in Nettapakkam Commune in the Union Territory of Puducherry, India.

== Geography ==
Kalmandapam is bordered by Nettapakkam to the west, Earipakkam to the north, Mitta Mandagapattu village to the east and Pandasozhanallur to the south.

== Transport ==
Kalmandapam is located 24 km from Pondicherry. Kalmandapam can be reached directly by any bus running between Pondicherry and Maducarai.

== Road network ==
Kalmandapam is connected to Pondicherry by the Mangalam–Maducarai State Highway (RC-19).

The following are roads in Kalmandapam:

- Mangalam–Maducarai State Highway (RC-19)
- Kalmandapam–Pandasozhanallur road
- Kalmandapam–Earipakkam road
- Kalmandapam–Pandasozhanallur Erikarai road
