= Pandasozhanallur =

Pandasozhanallur Thirumudavanpalli
- Village
- Location in Puducherry, India Pandasozhanallur (India)
- Coordinates: 11.856715°N 79.645053°E
- Country: India
- State: Puducherry
- District: Pondicherry
- Taluk: Bahour
- Commune: Nettapakkam

Languages
  - Official: French, Tamil, English
- Time zone: UTC+5:30 (IST)
- PIN: 605 106
- Telephone code: 0413
- Vehicle registration: PY-01
- Sex ratio: 50% ♂/♀

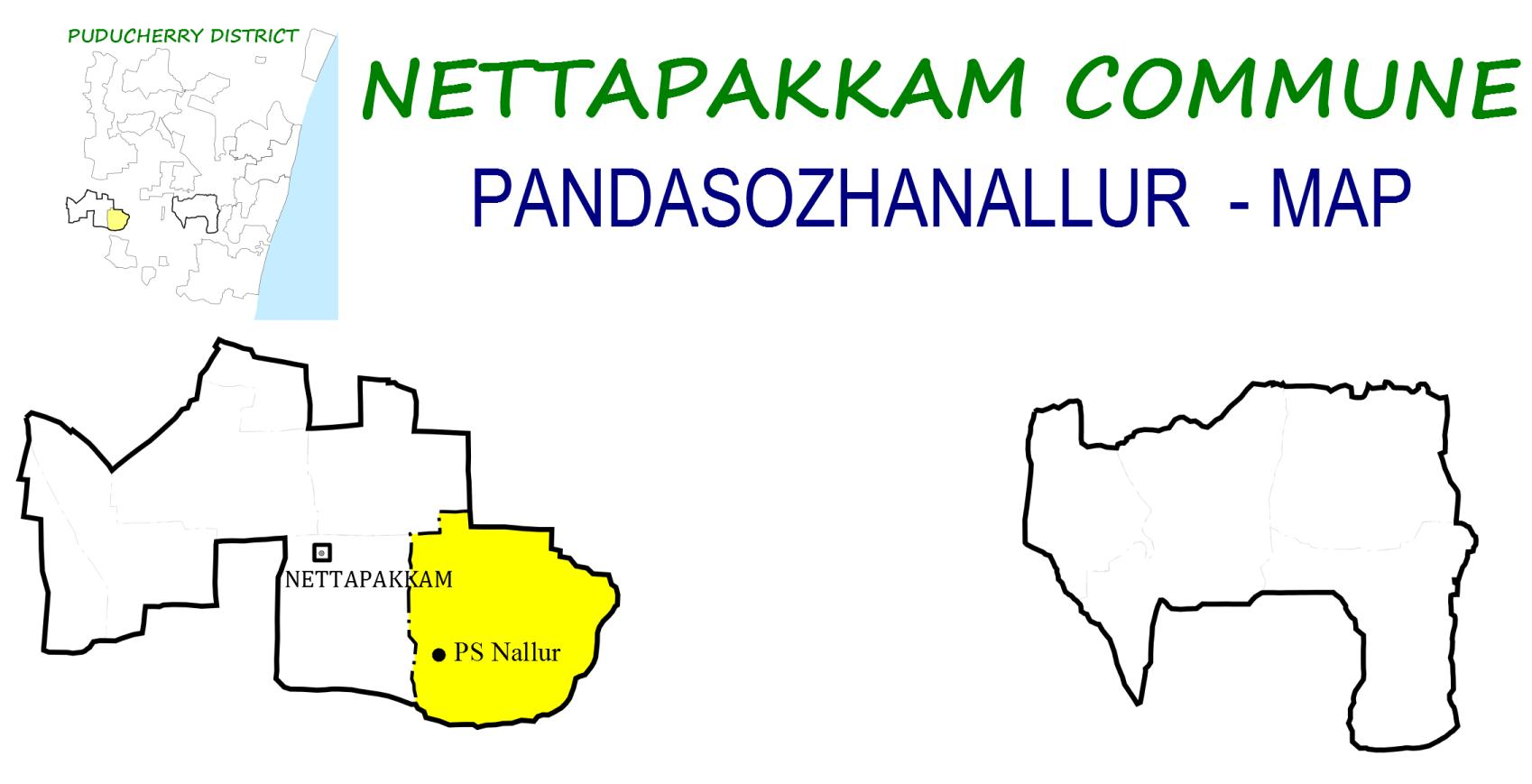
Pandasozhanallur, Nettapakkam Commune

Pandasozhanallur is a panchayat village in Nettapakkam Commune in the Union Territory of Puducherry, India. It is also a revenue village under Nettapakkam firka. Pandasozhanallur is also known as PS Nallur.

== Geography ==
Pandasozhanallur is bordered by Nettapakkam in the west, Kalmandapam in the north, Mitta Mandagapattu village(Tamil Nadu) in the east and Malattar in the south.

== History ==
According to inscriptions in the Malligajuneswarar temple here, the village must have been as Thirumudavanpalli during the days of Kulothunga - I (11th century), named after Thirumudavan, probably a chieftain in whose honour the Palli was built. The name of this Palli may have been ascribed to the village in due course. Since 12th Century the village is said to have been called Pandithasolanllur, after Rajaraja II who was otherwise known as Rajapandithan, erudite as he was both in Tamil and Sanskrit. The name Pandithasolanallur in due course changed into Pandasozhanur. Now it is called Pandasozhanallur.

== Transport ==
Pandasozhanallur is located at 2 km. from Nettapakkam on Frontier State Highway (RC-21). Pandasozhanallur can be reached directly by any bus running between Pondicherry and Karaiyamputhur running via Nettapakkam. Alternatively One can reach Nettapakkam by Pondicherry to Maducarai Bus and then took other means to reach Pandasozhanallur.

== Road Network ==
Pandasozhanallur is connected to Pondicherry by Frontier State Highway (RC-21). Pandasozhanallur is also connected by Kalmandapam-Pandasozhanallur road.

== Tourism ==
=== Malligarjunar Temple ===
Malligarjunar Temple is one of the ancient temple in Puducherry. It belongs to Chozha period.

== Gallery ==
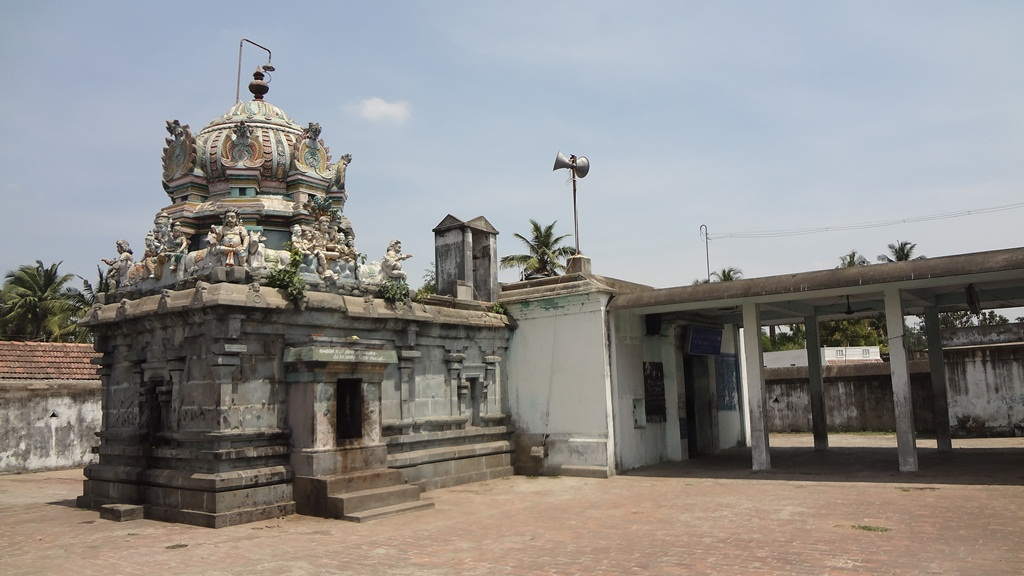
Malligarjunar Temple, Pandasozhanallur

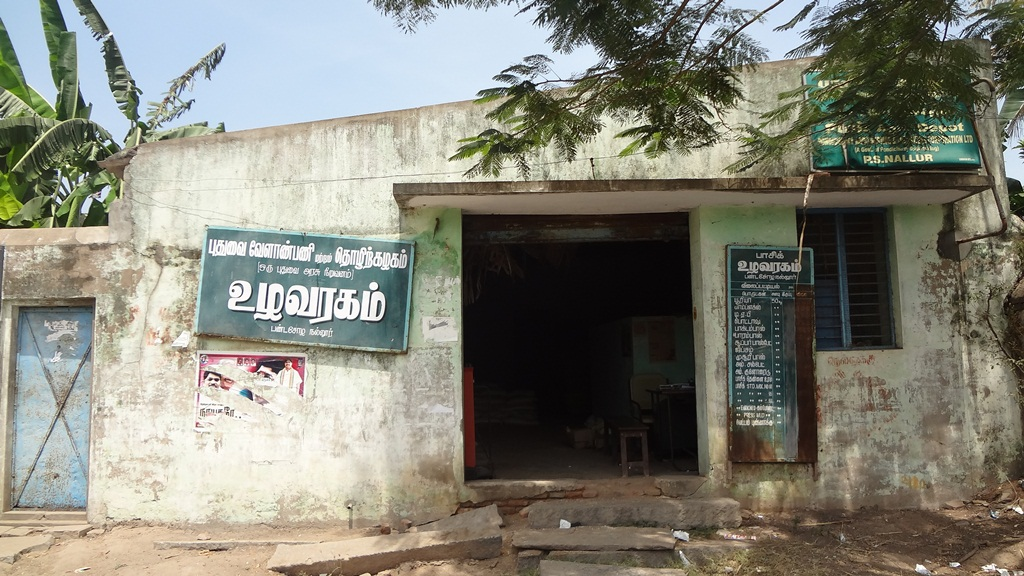
Uzhavagam, Pandasozhanallur

== Politics ==
Pandasozhanallur is a part of Nettapakkam (Union Territory Assembly constituency) which comes under Puducherry (Lok Sabha constituency)
