= State Highway RC-20 (Puducherry) =

Road in Puducherry, India

State Highway RC-20

Route information
- Maintained by Public Works Department (PWD), Puducherry
- Length: 9.123 km (5.669 mi)

Major junctions
- RC-18 at Karikalampakkam; RC-19 at Embalam

Location
- Country: India
- Union territories: Puducherry
- Districts: Puducherry, Cuddlore

Highway system
- Roads in India; Expressways; National; State; Asian

RC-20 or Thavalakuppam–Embalam Road branches out from National Highways 45A at Thavalakuppam and ends at Embalam.

It is passing through the following villages:

- Abishegapakkam
- Karikalampakkam
