= Sooramangalam =

- Village
- Location in Puducherry, India Sooramangalam (India)
- Coordinates: 11.88816°N 79.630044°E
- Country: India
- State: Puducherry
- District: Pondicherry
- Taluk: Bahour
- Commune: Nettapakkam

Languages
  - Official: French, Tamil, English
- Time zone: UTC+5:30 (IST)
- PIN: 605 106
- Telephone code: 0413
- Vehicle registration: PY-01
- Sex ratio: 50% ♂/♀

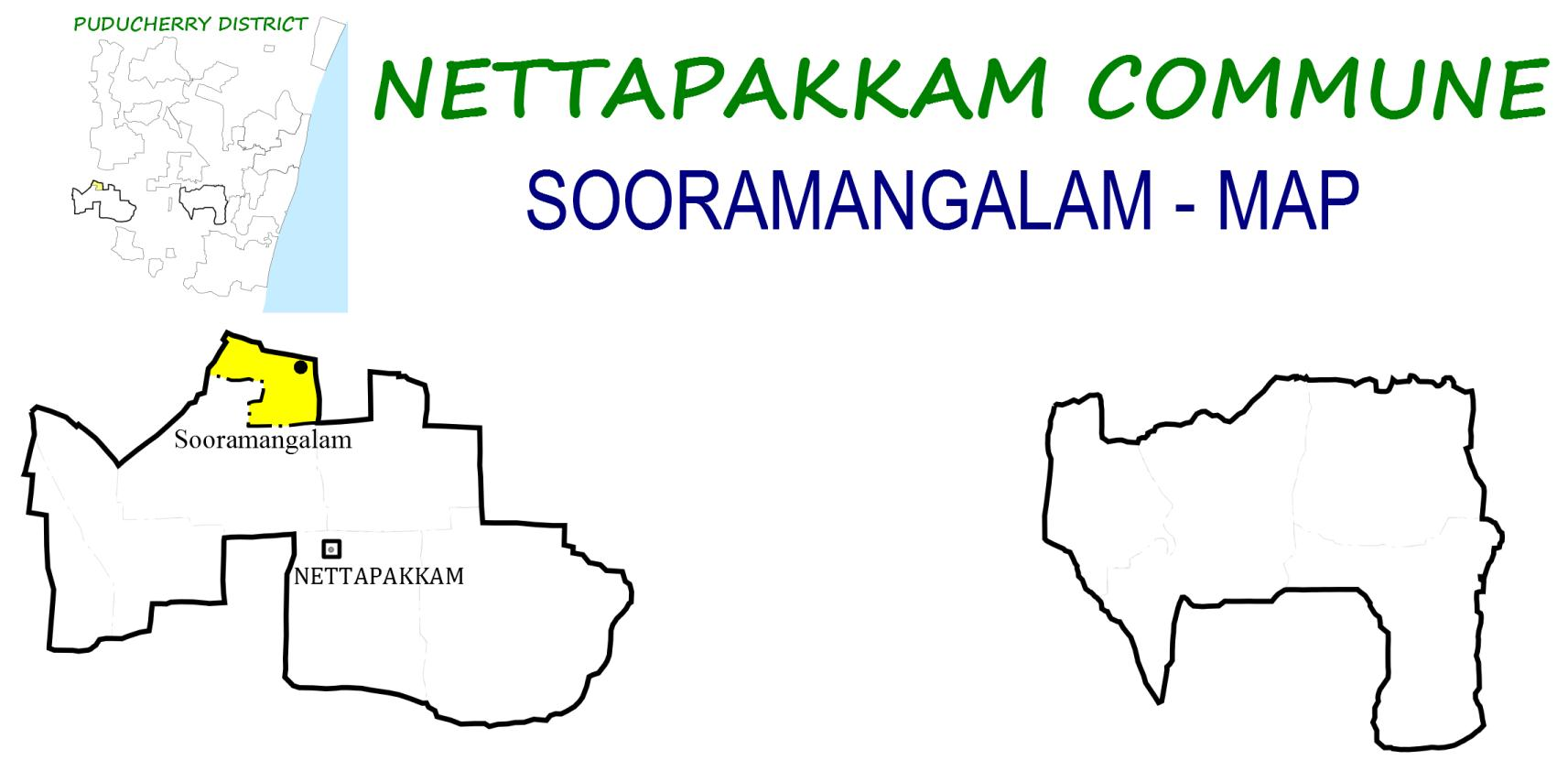
Sooramangalam, Nettapakkam Commune

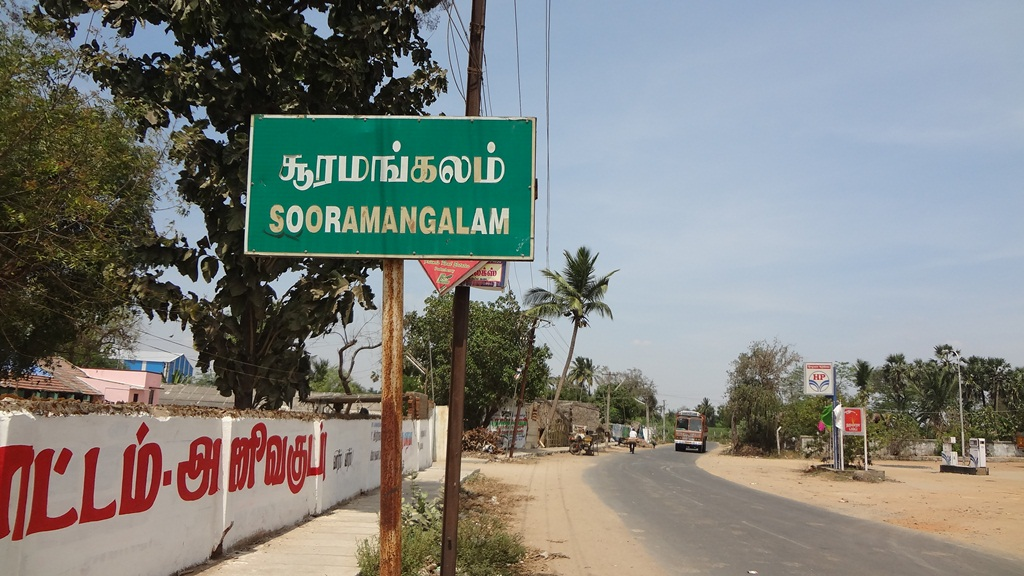
Sooramangalam

Sooramangalam is a panchayat village in Nettapakkam Commune in the Union Territory of Puducherry, India.

== Geography ==
Sooramangalam is bordered by Kariyamanickam in the south and rest all three sides by villages belonging to Tamil Nadu. Sooramangalam is located on the north tip of Nettapakkam Enclave.

== Transport ==
Sooramangalam is located at 28 km. from Pondicherry. Sooramangalam can be reached directly by any bus running between Pondicherry and Maducarai running via Madagadipattu.

== Road Network ==
Sooramangalam is connected to Pondicherry by Frontier State Highway (RC-21).

== Politics ==
Sooramangalam is a part of Nettapakkam (Union Territory Assembly constituency) which comes under Puducherry (Lok Sabha constituency)
