= Korkadu =

- Village
- Location in Puducherry, India Korkadu (India)
- Coordinates: 11.880129°N 79.74201°E
- Country: India
- State: Puducherry
- District: Pondicherry
- Taluk: Bahour
- Commune: Nettapakkam

Languages
  - Official: French, Tamil, English
- Time zone: UTC+5:30 (IST)
- PIN: 605 110
- Telephone code: 0413
- Vehicle registration: PY-01
- Sex ratio: 50% ♂/♀

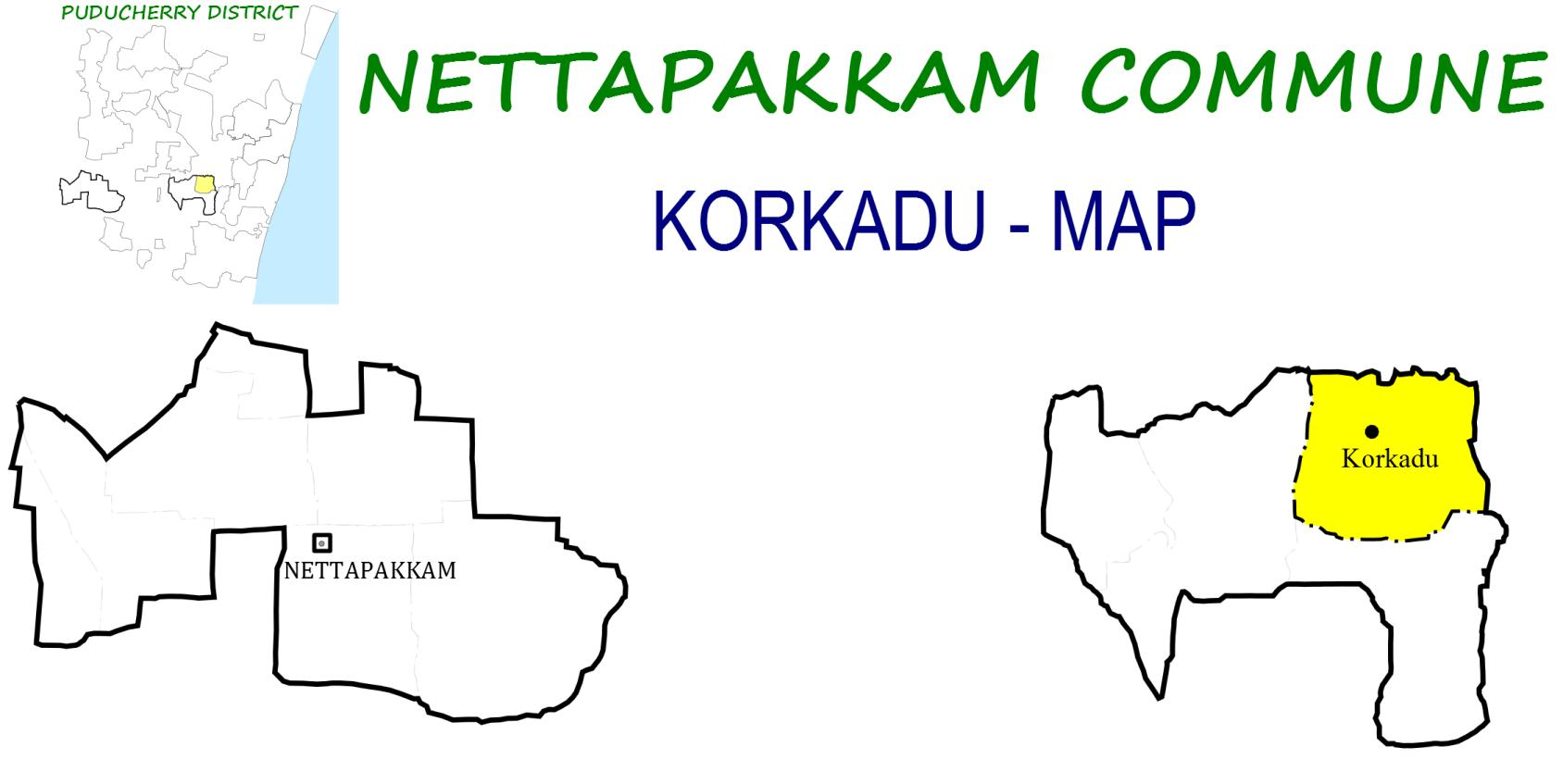
Korkadu, Nettapakkam Commune

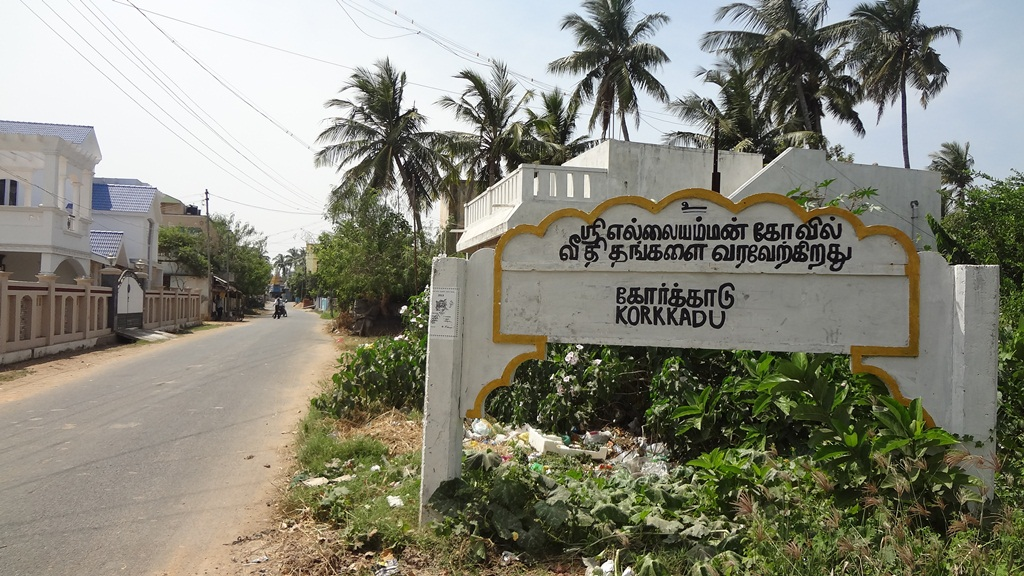
Korkadu

Korkadu is a panchayat village in Nettapakkam Commune in the Union Territory of Puducherry, India. It is also a revenue village under Nettapakkam firka.

== Geography ==
Korkadu is bordered by Sembiapalayam in the west, Mangalam in the north, Uruvaiyar in the east and Karikalampakkam in the south.

== Transport ==
Korkadu is located at 18 km. from Pondicherry. Korkadu can be reached directly by any bus running between Puducherry - Maducarai or Puducherry- Bahour via Villianur.

== Road Network ==
Korkadu is connected to Pondicherry by Korkadu Erikarai road. This road serves as a link road between Villianur-Bahour road (RC-18) and Mangalam-Maducarai road (RC-19). There is also another link road between RC-18 and RC-19 via Uruvaiyar.

== Politics ==
Korkadu is a part of Embalam (Union Territory Assembly constituency) which comes under Puducherry (Lok Sabha constituency)
