= Nettapakkam firka =

Coordinates: 11°52′6.7″N 79°37′55.34″E

Nettapakkam is one of the three firkas of Bahour taluk in Pondicherry (North) revenue sub-division of the Indian union territory of Puducherry.

== Revenue villages ==
The following are the revenue villages under Nettapakkam Firka:

- Embalam
- Eripakkam
- Kariamanickam
- Karikalampakkam
- Korkadu
- Maducarai
- Nettapakkam
- Pandasozhanallur

== See also ==
- Bahour firka
- Selliamedu firka
