= M. Kandaswamy =

M. Kandaswamy may refer to:

- M. Kandaswamy (Tamil Nadu politician)
- M. Kandaswamy (Puducherry politician)
