= Nettapakkam Assembly constituency =

Constituency of the Puducherry legislative assembly in India

Coordinates: 11.863°N 79.632°E

Nettapakkam
- Constituency No. 22 for the Puducherry Legislative Assembly
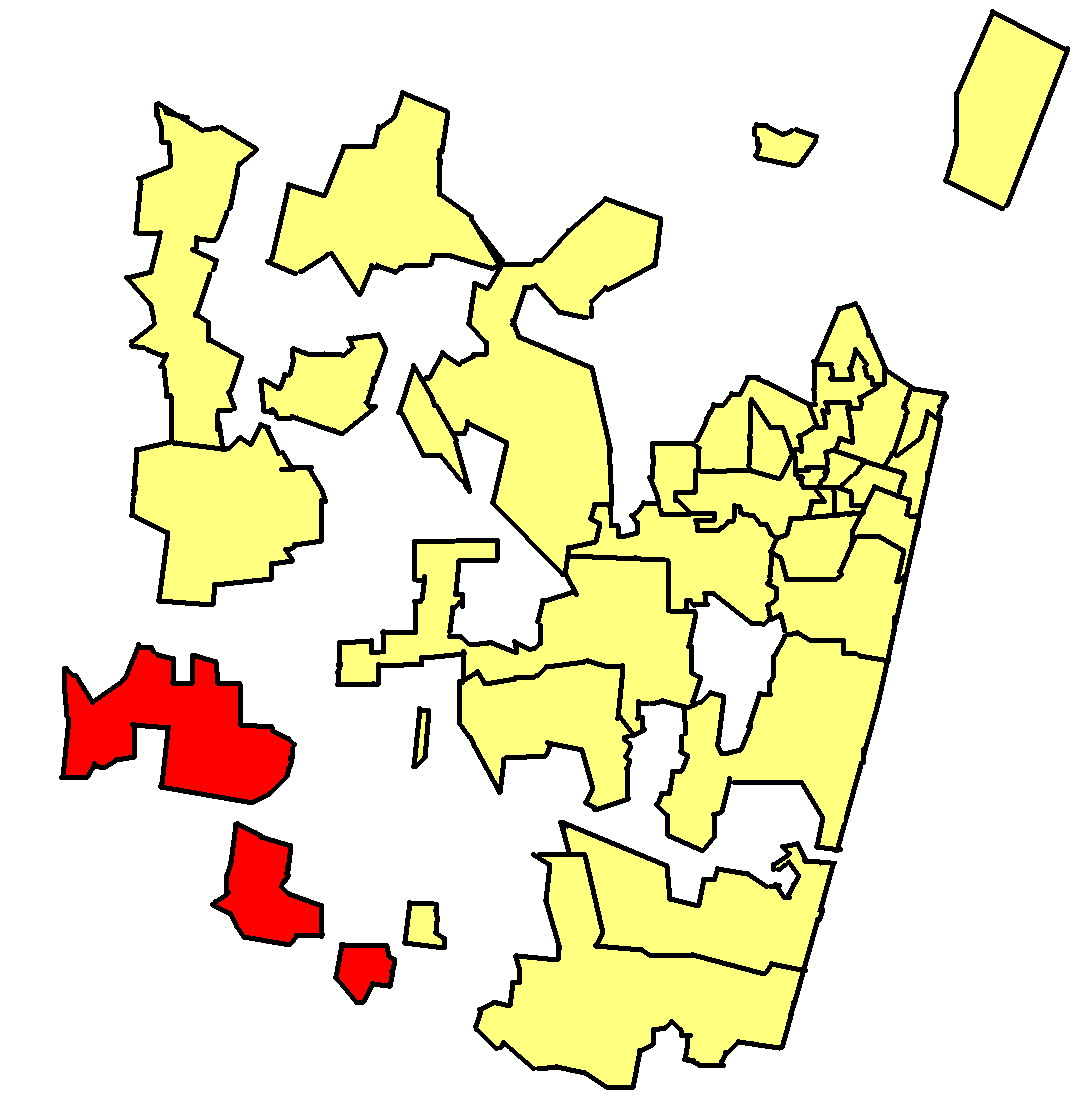

Constituency details
- Country: India
- Region: South India
- Union Territory: Puducherry
- District: Puducherry
- Lok Sabha constituency: Puducherry
- Established: 1964
- Total electors: 32,707
- Reservation: SC

Member of Legislative Assembly
- 16th Puducherry Legislative Assembly
- Incumbent P. Rajavelu
- Party: AINRC
- Alliance: NDA
- Elected year: 2021

Nettapakkam is a legislative assembly constituency in the Union territory of Puducherry in India. Nettapakkam Assembly constituency is part of Puducherry Lok Sabha constituency. This assembly constituency has been reserved for SC candidates since the 2011 election.

== Segments ==
1. Maducarai
2. Nettapakkam
3. Kariyamanickam
4. Sooramangalam
5. Pandasozhanallur
6. Earipakkam

== Members of Legislative Assembly ==
| Pondicherry Assembly | Duration | Name of M.L.A. | Party Affiliation | Election Year |
|---|---|---|---|---|
| First | 1964-69 | V. Venkatasubha Reddiar | Indian National Congress | 1964 |
| Second | 1969-1973 | M. D. R. Ramachandran | Dravida Munnetra Kazhagam | 1969 |
| Third | 1974-1977 | V. Venkatasubha Reddiar | Indian National Congress | 1974 |
| Fourth | 1977-80 | S. Sivaprakasam | Indian National Congress | 1977 |
| Fifth | 1980-83 | R. Subbaraya Gounder | Janata Party | 1980 |
| Sixth | 1985-90 | V. Vaithilingam | Indian National Congress | 1985 |
| Seventh | 1990-91 | V. Vaithilingam | Indian National Congress | 1990 |
| Eighth | 1991-96 | V. Vaithilingam | Indian National Congress | 1991 |
| Ninth | 1996-01 | V. Vaithilingam | Indian National Congress | 1996 |
| Tenth | 2001-06 | V. Vaithilingam | Indian National Congress | 2001 |
| Elewenth | 2006-11 | V. Vaithilingam | Indian National Congress | 2006 |
| Twelfth | 2011-16 | L. Periyasamy | All India Anna Dravida Munnetra Kazhagam | 2011 |
| Thirteenth | 2016 – 2021 | V. Vizeaveny | Indian National Congress | 2016 |
| Fourteenth | 2021-26 | P. Rajavelu | All India N.R. Congress | 2021 |

== Election results ==
Vote share of winning candidates
| 2021 | 56.82% |
| 2016 | 38.93% |
| 2011 | 59.80% |
| 2006 | 52.20% |
| 2001 | 39.47% |
| 1996 | 54.86% |
| 1991 | 66.14% |
| 1990 | 55.34% |
| 1985 | 72.94% |
| 1980 | 49.89% |
| 1977 | 41.73% |
| 1974 | 55.65% |
| 1969 | 51.10% |
| 1964 | 83.54% |

=== Assembly Election 2026 ===
2026 Puducherry Legislative Assembly election: Nettapakkam
| Party | Candidate | Votes | % | ±% |
|---|---|---|---|---|
| AINRC | P. RAJAVELU | 13665 | 47.58 | |
| INC | G. ANBARASAN | 6976 | 24.29 | |
| TVK | L. Periyasamy | 5382 | 18.74 | New |
| NOTA | NOTA | 191 | 0.67 | |
| Margin of victory | | 6689 | | |
| Turnout | | 28718 | | |
| Rejected ballots | | | | |
| Registered electors | | 30,129 | | |
| gain from | | Swing | | |

=== Assembly Election 2021 ===
2021 Puducherry Legislative Assembly election: Nettapakkam
| Party | Candidate | Votes | % | ±% |
|---|---|---|---|---|
| AINRC | P. Rajavelu | 15,978 | 56.82% | |
| INC | V. Vizeaveny | 9,340 | 33.21% | −5.71% |
| Independent | C. Krishnagopal | 599 | 2.13% | |
| Independent | S. Thirunavukkarasu | 470 | 1.67% | |
| NOTA | Nota | 282 | 1.00% | −0.13% |
| Amma Makkal Munnettra Kazagam | M. Selvam | 253 | 0.90% | |
| MNM | B. Gnanaoly | 241 | 0.86% | |
| BSP | M. Paranthaman | 133 | 0.47% | |
| Margin of victory | | 6,638 | 23.61% | 18.20% |
| Turnout | | 28,121 | 86.93% | −1.68% |
| Registered electors | | 32,350 | | 5.49% |
| AINRC gain from INC | | Swing | 17.89% | |

=== Assembly Election 2016 ===
2016 Puducherry Legislative Assembly election: Nettapakkam
| Party | Candidate | Votes | % | ±% |
|---|---|---|---|---|
| INC | V. Vizeaveny | 10,577 | 38.93% | 1.39% |
| AINRC | P. Rajavelu | 9,109 | 33.52% | |
| AIADMK | L. Periasamy | 4,917 | 18.10% | −41.70% |
| VCK | R. Vadivelu | 744 | 2.74% | |
| PMK | K. Subramanian | 439 | 1.62% | |
| BJP | A. Viswamohan | 381 | 1.40% | 0.44% |
| NOTA | None of the Above | 307 | 1.13% | |
| Independent | R. Ayanar | 274 | 1.01% | |
| Independent | A. Anandadurai | 153 | 0.56% | |
| Independent | S. Ezhilarasan | 129 | 0.47% | |
| Margin of victory | | 1,468 | 5.40% | −16.86% |
| Turnout | | 27,171 | 88.61% | −1.44% |
| Registered electors | | 30,665 | | 12.43% |
| INC gain from AIADMK | | Swing | -20.87% | |

=== Assembly Election 2011 ===
2011 Puducherry Legislative Assembly election: Nettapakkam
| Party | Candidate | Votes | % | ±% |
|---|---|---|---|---|
| AIADMK | L. Periyasamy | 14,686 | 59.80% | |
| INC | S. Muthukumarasamy | 9,219 | 37.54% | −14.67% |
| BJP | A. Viswamohan | 237 | 0.96% | −0.42% |
| BSP | M. Somasundaram | 129 | 0.53% | |
| Independent | P. Viraganabady | 110 | 0.45% | |
| Margin of victory | | 5,467 | 22.26% | 14.65% |
| Turnout | | 24,560 | 90.05% | −0.36% |
| Registered electors | | 27,274 | | 40.44% |
| AIADMK gain from INC | | Swing | 7.59% | |

=== Assembly Election 2006 ===
2006 Pondicherry Legislative Assembly election: Nettapakkam
| Party | Candidate | Votes | % | ±% |
|---|---|---|---|---|
| INC | V. Vaithilingam | 9,166 | 52.20% | 12.73% |
| PMC | V. Muthunarayanan | 7,830 | 44.60% | |
| DMDK | S. Dhanaboopathy | 305 | 1.74% | |
| BJP | J. Datchinamoorthy | 244 | 1.39% | |
| Margin of victory | | 1,336 | 7.61% | −0.39% |
| Turnout | | 17,558 | 90.41% | 11.00% |
| Registered electors | | 19,421 | | 1.71% |
| INC hold | | Swing | 12.73% | |

=== Assembly Election 2001 ===
2001 Pondicherry Legislative Assembly election: Nettapakkam
| Party | Candidate | Votes | % | ±% |
|---|---|---|---|---|
| INC | V. Vaithilingam | 5,984 | 39.47% | −15.39% |
| PMK | K. Dhanraju | 4,771 | 31.47% | |
| Pondicherry Makkal Congress | V. Muthunarayanan | 3,722 | 24.55% | |
| Independent | S. Dhanaboopathy | 471 | 3.11% | |
| Independent | K. Dhakshanamoorthy | 118 | 0.78% | |
| Independent | D. Kandasamy | 95 | 0.63% | |
| Margin of victory | | 1,213 | 8.00% | −10.33% |
| Turnout | | 15,161 | 79.40% | 8.72% |
| Registered electors | | 19,095 | | 11.13% |
| INC hold | | Swing | -26.67% | |

=== Assembly Election 1996 ===
1996 Pondicherry Legislative Assembly election: Nettapakkam
| Party | Candidate | Votes | % | ±% |
|---|---|---|---|---|
| INC | V. Vaithilingam | 7,563 | 54.86% | −11.27% |
| Independent | V. Muthunarayana Reddiar | 5,036 | 36.53% | |
| DMK | P. M. Mathy @ Subbarayan | 567 | 4.11% | −26.79% |
| Independent | P. Jayaraman | 224 | 1.62% | |
| Independent | S. Kumar | 84 | 0.61% | |
| Independent | M. Raju | 67 | 0.49% | |
| AIIC(T) | C. Chinnasamy | 64 | 0.46% | |
| Margin of victory | | 2,527 | 18.33% | −16.91% |
| Turnout | | 13,785 | 83.58% | 12.89% |
| Registered electors | | 17,182 | | −2.54% |
| INC hold | | Swing | -11.27% | |

=== Assembly Election 1991 ===
1991 Pondicherry Legislative Assembly election: Nettapakkam
| Party | Candidate | Votes | % | ±% |
|---|---|---|---|---|
| INC | V. Vaithilingam | 8,095 | 66.14% | 10.80% |
| DMK | R. Subbaraya Gounder | 3,782 | 30.90% | 6.80% |
| BJP | V. Subramanian | 119 | 0.97% | 0.23% |
| Independent | Valaramani | 95 | 0.78% | |
| Margin of victory | | 4,313 | 35.24% | 4.00% |
| Turnout | | 12,240 | 70.68% | −6.62% |
| Registered electors | | 17,629 | | 1.77% |
| INC hold | | Swing | 10.80% | |

=== Assembly Election 1990 ===
1990 Pondicherry Legislative Assembly election: Nettapakkam
| Party | Candidate | Votes | % | ±% |
|---|---|---|---|---|
| INC | V. Vaithilingam | 7,332 | 55.34% | −17.60% |
| DMK | N. Devadass | 3,193 | 24.10% | −2.96% |
| JD | R. Subbaraya Gounder | 2,027 | 15.30% | |
| PMK | Kothandapani Counder | 268 | 2.02% | |
| BSP | M. Dhanam Munusamy | 117 | 0.88% | |
| BJP | V. Subramanian | 98 | 0.74% | |
| Independent | P. M. Subbarayan | 88 | 0.66% | |
| Margin of victory | | 4,139 | 31.24% | −14.64% |
| Turnout | | 13,250 | 77.31% | −5.42% |
| Registered electors | | 17,322 | | 49.04% |
| INC hold | | Swing | -17.60% | |

=== Assembly Election 1985 ===
1985 Pondicherry Legislative Assembly election: Nettapakkam
| Party | Candidate | Votes | % | ±% |
|---|---|---|---|---|
| INC | V. Vaithilingam | 6,946 | 72.94% | |
| DMK | P. Ramamurthy | 2,577 | 27.06% | |
| Margin of victory | | 4,369 | 45.88% | 44.39% |
| Turnout | | 9,523 | 82.73% | −7.13% |
| Registered electors | | 11,622 | | 20.20% |
| INC gain from JP | | Swing | 23.05% | |

=== Assembly Election 1980 ===
1980 Pondicherry Legislative Assembly election: Nettapakkam
| Party | Candidate | Votes | % | ±% |
|---|---|---|---|---|
| JP | R. Subbaraya Gounder | 4,201 | 49.89% | |
| INC(I) | V. Vaithilingam | 4,076 | 48.40% | |
| Independent | S. Nara Reddiar | 144 | 1.71% | |
| Margin of victory | | 125 | 1.48% | −1.28% |
| Turnout | | 8,421 | 89.86% | 4.86% |
| Registered electors | | 9,669 | | 8.53% |
| JP gain from INC | | Swing | 8.15% | |

=== Assembly Election 1977 ===
1977 Pondicherry Legislative Assembly election: Nettapakkam
| Party | Candidate | Votes | % | ±% |
|---|---|---|---|---|
| INC | S. Srvaprakasam | 3,122 | 41.73% | −13.92% |
| JP | R. Subbaraya Goundar | 2,915 | 38.97% | |
| AIADMK | M. R. Veerappan | 1,378 | 18.42% | −17.09% |
| DMK | D. Ramabadra Reddiar | 66 | 0.88% | −7.96% |
| Margin of victory | | 207 | 2.77% | −17.38% |
| Turnout | | 7,481 | 85.00% | −7.00% |
| Registered electors | | 8,909 | | 9.47% |
| INC hold | | Swing | -13.92% | |

=== Assembly Election 1974 ===
1974 Pondicherry Legislative Assembly election: Nettapakkam
| Party | Candidate | Votes | % | ±% |
|---|---|---|---|---|
| INC | V. Venkatasubba Reddiar | 4,072 | 55.65% | 6.75% |
| AIADMK | S. Vengatachalapathi | 2,598 | 35.51% | |
| DMK | S. Ramamoorthi | 647 | 8.84% | −42.25% |
| Margin of victory | | 1,474 | 20.14% | 17.95% |
| Turnout | | 7,317 | 92.00% | −0.09% |
| Registered electors | | 8,138 | | 6.21% |
| INC gain from DMK | | Swing | 4.56% | |

=== Assembly Election 1969 ===
1969 Pondicherry Legislative Assembly election: Nettapakkam
| Party | Candidate | Votes | % | ±% |
|---|---|---|---|---|
| DMK | D. Ramachandran | 3,545 | 51.10% | |
| INC | V. Venkatasubba Reddiar | 3,393 | 48.90% | −34.64% |
| Margin of victory | | 152 | 2.19% | −64.90% |
| Turnout | | 6,938 | 92.09% | 3.90% |
| Registered electors | | 7,662 | | 8.97% |
| DMK gain from INC | | Swing | -32.45% | |

=== Assembly Election 1964 ===
1964 Pondicherry Legislative Assembly election: Nettapakkam
| Party | Candidate | Votes | % | ±% |
|---|---|---|---|---|
| INC | V. Venkatasubba Reddiar | 4,965 | 83.54% | |
| Independent | S. Ramaputhiran | 978 | 16.46% | |
| Margin of victory | | 3,987 | 67.09% | |
| Turnout | | 5,943 | 88.20% | |
| Registered electors | | 7,031 | | |
| INC win (new seat) | | | | |

ś

== See also ==
- List of constituencies of the Puducherry Legislative Assembly
- Puducherry district
