= State Highway RC-19 (Puducherry) =

Road in Puducherry, India

State Highway RC-19

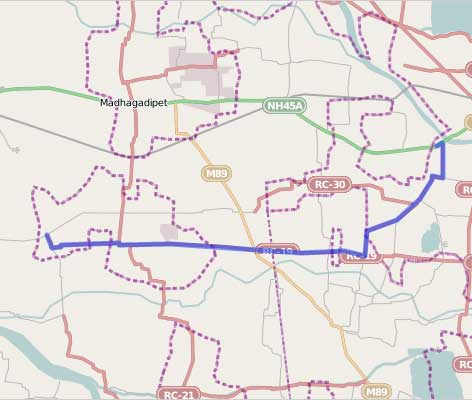

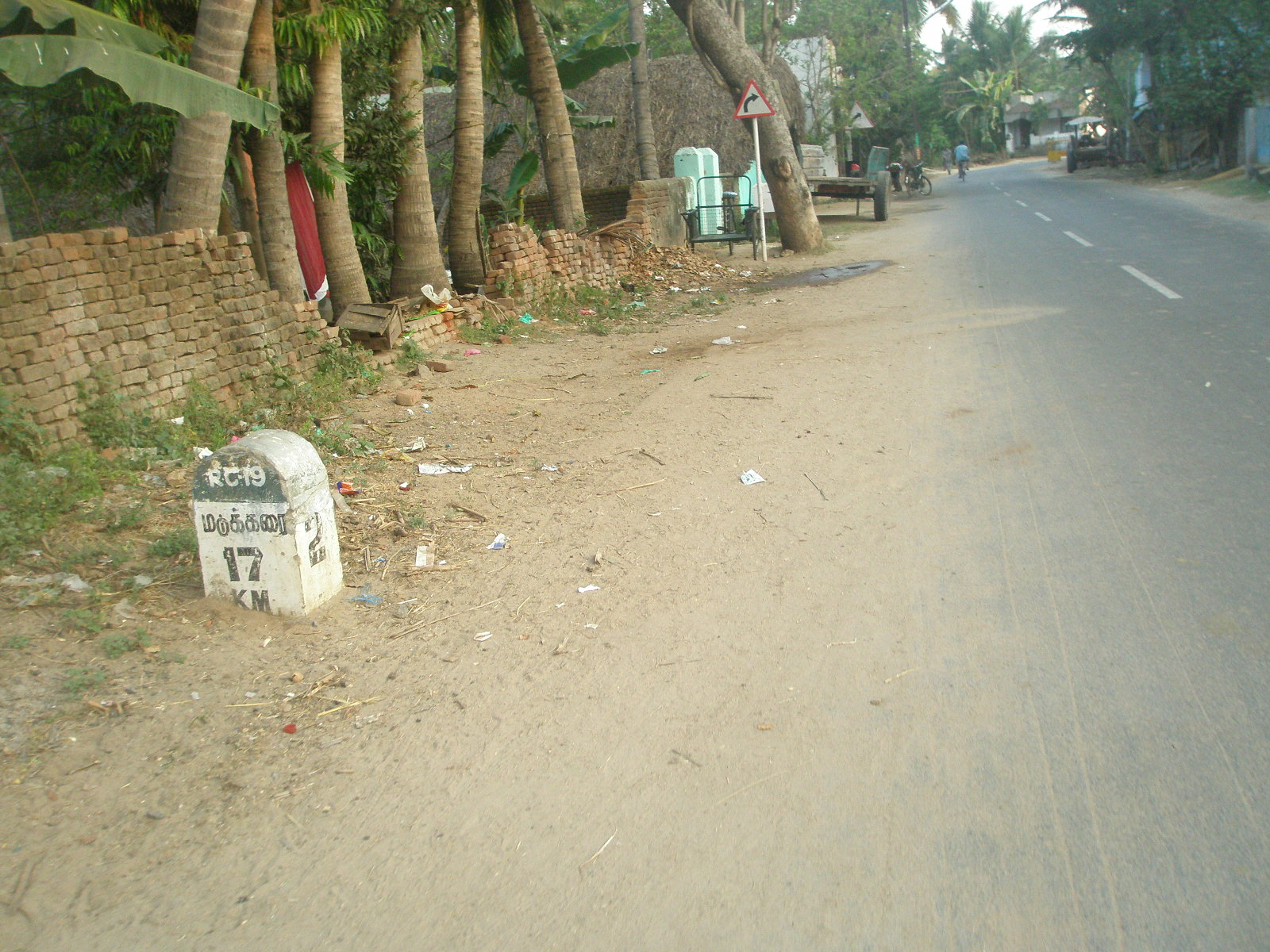
- RC-19 (Mangalam–Embalam–Maducarai Road), Puducherry

Route information
- Maintained by Public Works Department (PWD), Puducherry
- Length: 18.565 km (11.536 mi)

Major junctions
- RC-30 at Sembiapalayam; RC-20 at Embalam; RC-21 at Nettapakkam

Location
- Country: India
- Union territories: Puducherry
- Districts: Puducherry, Cuddlore, Villupuram

Highway system
- Roads in India; Expressways; National; State; Asian

RC-19 or Mangalam–Embalam–Maducarai Road starts from Mangalam and ends at Maducarai.

It is passing through the following villages:

- Sembiapalayam
- Embalam
- Nallathur
- Pakkam X Kootroad
- Kalmandapam
- Nettapakkam
