= State Highway RC-30 (Puducherry) =

Road in Puducherry, India

State Highway RC-30

Route information
- Maintained by Public Works Department (PWD), Puducherry
- Length: 11.415 km (7.093 mi)

Major junctions
- RC-19 at Sembiapalayam

Location
- Country: India
- Union territories: Puducherry
- Districts: Puducherry

Highway system
- Roads in India; Expressways; National; State; Asian

RC-30 or Sembiapalayam–Kizhur Road branches out from RC-19 at Sembiapalayam and ends at Kizhur.

It is passing through the following villages:

- Sathamangalam
- Sivaranthagam
