= Earipakkam =

Earipakkam Eripakkam
- Village
- Location in Puducherry, India Earipakkam (India)
- Coordinates: 11.881294°N 79.6403°E
- Country: India
- State: Puducherry
- District: Pondicherry
- Taluk: Bahour
- Commune: Nettapakkam

Languages
  - Official: French, Tamil, English
- Time zone: UTC+5:30 (IST)
- PIN: 605 106
- Telephone code: 0413
- Vehicle registration: PY-01
- Sex ratio: 50% ♂/♀

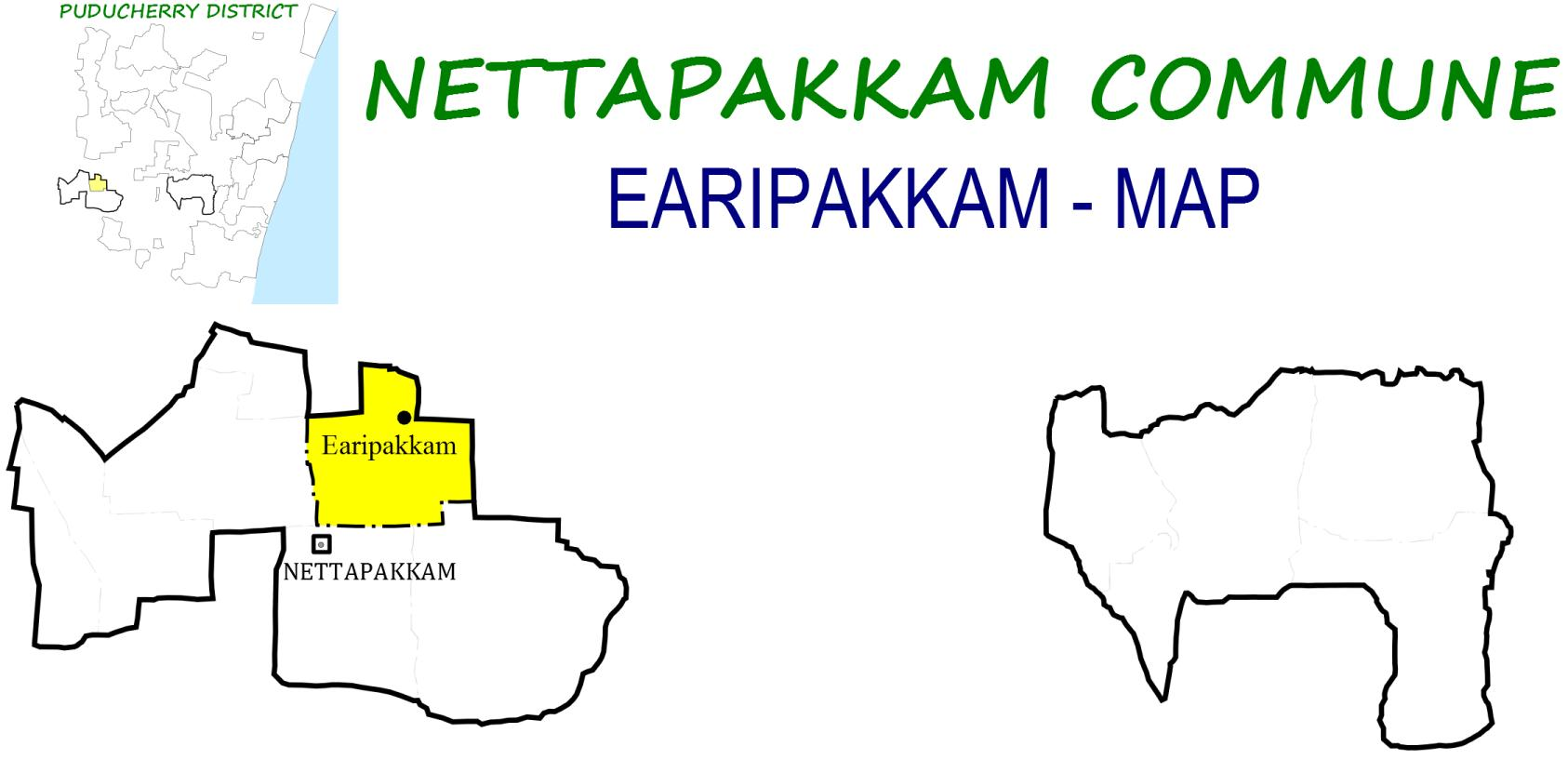
Earipakkam, Nettapakkam Commune

Earipakkam is a panchayat village in Nettapakkam Commune in the Union Territory of Puducherry, India. It is also a revenue village under Nettapakkam firka.

== Geography ==
Earipakkam is bordered by Kariyamanickam to the west; Kothambakkam, Tamil Nadu to the north; Palli Puthupattu, Tamil Nadu to the east; and Nettapakkam to the south.

== Demographics ==
As of the 2011 Census, Earipakkam had 4,113 residents, 1,940 of whom (47.17%) were members of scheduled castes.

== Politics ==
Earipakkam is a part of Nettapakkam (Union Territory Assembly constituency) which comes under Puducherry (Lok Sabha constituency).

== Gallery ==
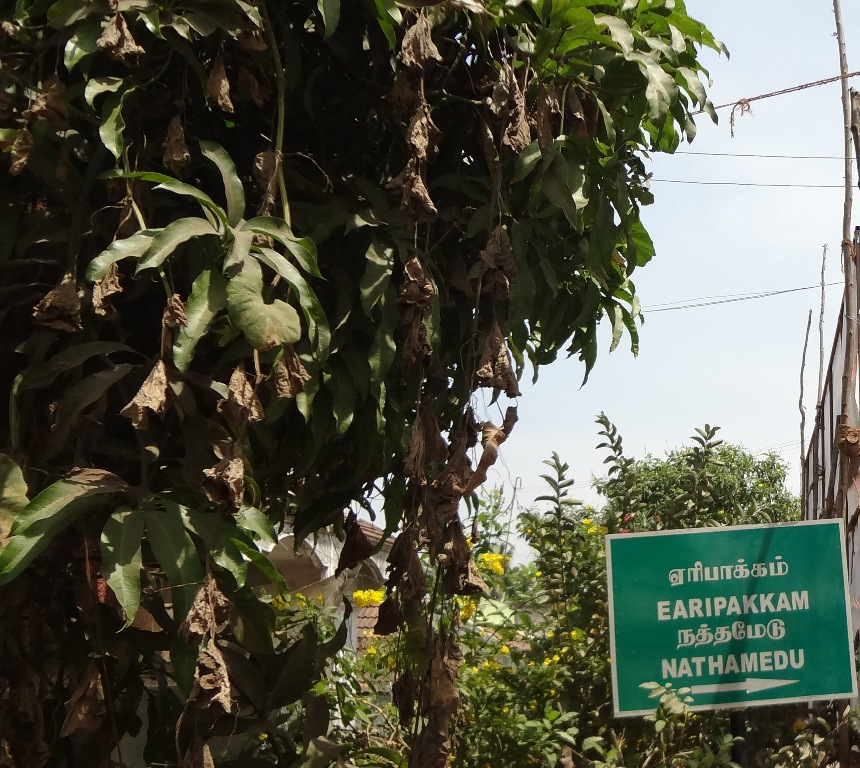
Earipakkam

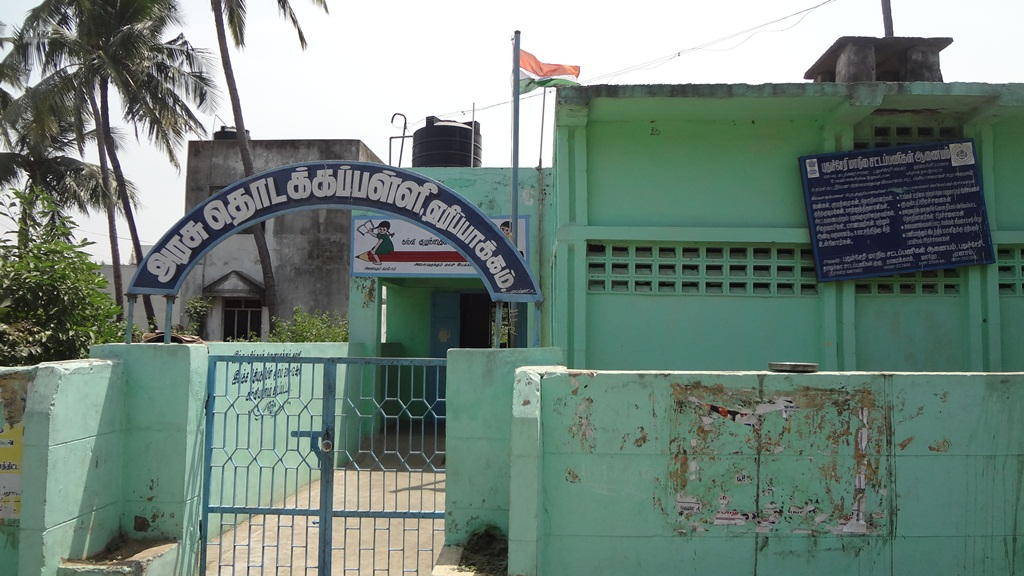
Earipakkam-School
