= Nettapakkam commune =

Coordinates: 11°51′54.5″N 79°38′2.67″E

Nettapakkam
- Commune
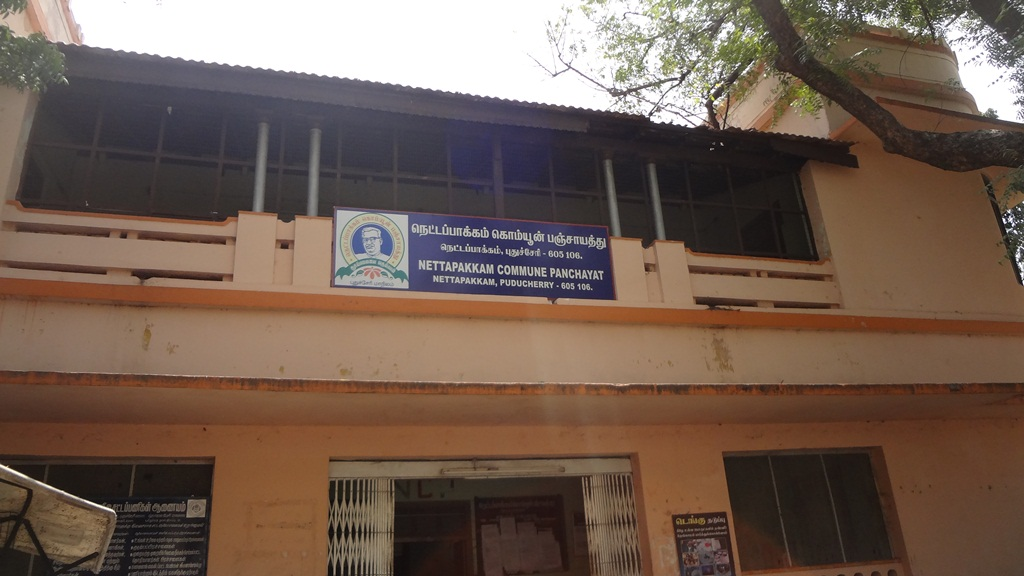
- Commune office of Nettapakkam
- Interactive map of Nettapakkam
- Country: India
- Territory: Puducherry
- District: Pondicherry
- Website: nettapakkamcommune.in

Nettapakkam is one of five communes in the Pondicherry district in the Indian territory of Puducherry. Nettapakkam is under the Bahour taluk of Puducherry.

== Panchayat villages ==
The following are 11 panchayat villages under the Netapakkam Commune, viz.

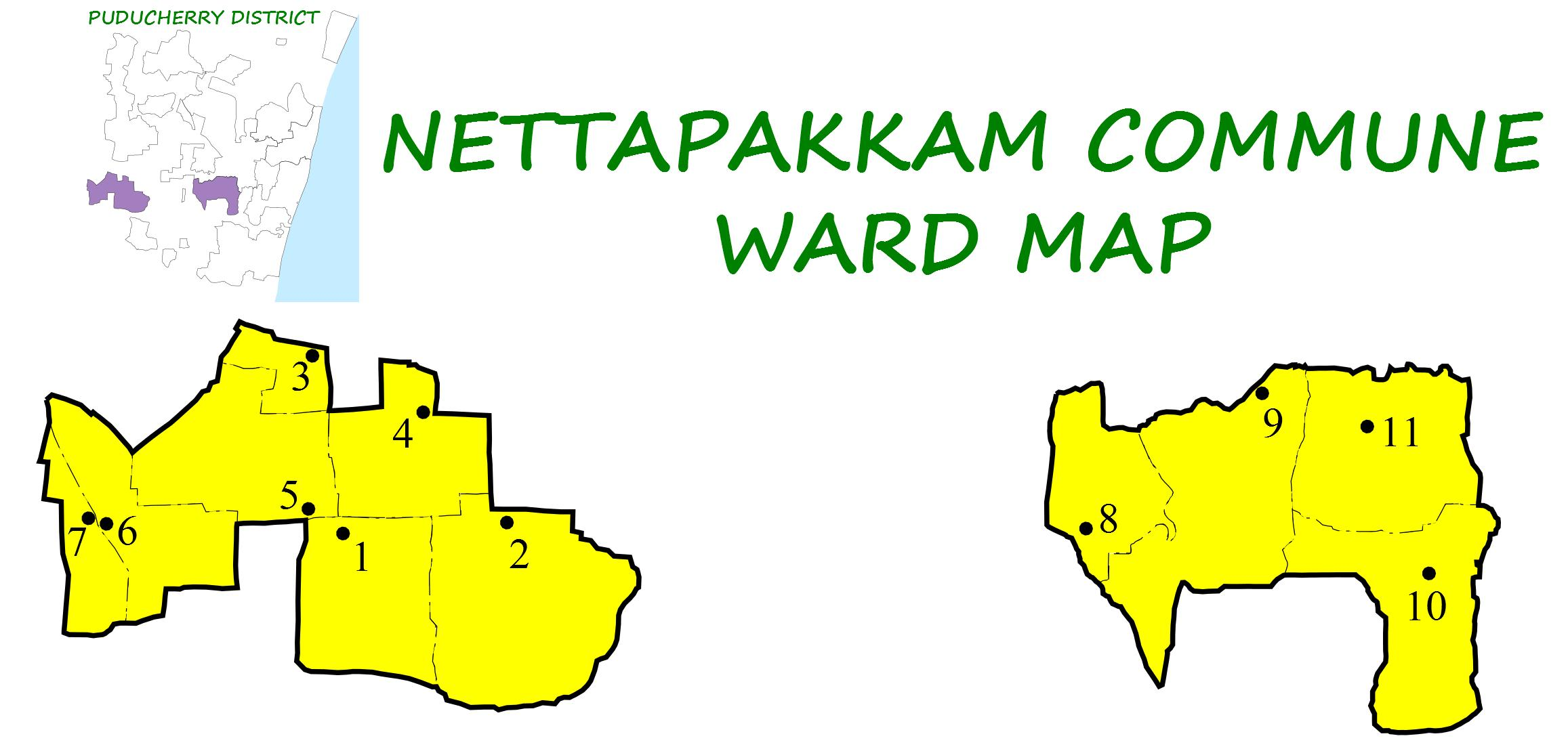

Ward Number	Ward Name	Area (km^{2})	Population (2011 Census)	Jurisdiction	Ward Map
1	Nettapakkam			Nettapakkam, Nadunayagapuram, Mettutheruvu, Sembadapet	
2	Kalmandapam-Pandasozhanallur			Kalmandapam, Pandasozhanallur, Vaduvakuppam, Andarasikuppam	
3	Sooramangalam			Sooramangalam	
4	Earipakkam			Earipakkam, Nathamedu	
5	Kariyamanickam			Kariyamanickam, Molapakkam	
6	Maducarai(East)			Kuruvampattu, Kutchipalayam, Ranganathanpattu	
7	Maducarai(West)			Maducarai	
8	Embalam			Embalam	
9	Sembiapalayam			Kambalikarankuppam, Nathamedu, Pudukuppam, Sembiampalayam	
10	Karikalampakkam			Karikalampakkam	
11	Korkadu			Korkadu	
