= Karikalampakkam =

- Village
- Location in Puducherry, India Karikalampakkam (India)
- Coordinates: 11.864579°N 79.748855°E
- Country: India
- State: Puducherry
- District: Pondicherry
- Taluk: Bahour
- Commune: Nettapakkam

Languages
  - Official: French, Tamil, English
- Time zone: UTC+5:30 (IST)
- PIN: 605 007
- Telephone code: 0413
- Vehicle registration: PY-01
- Sex ratio: 50% ♂/♀

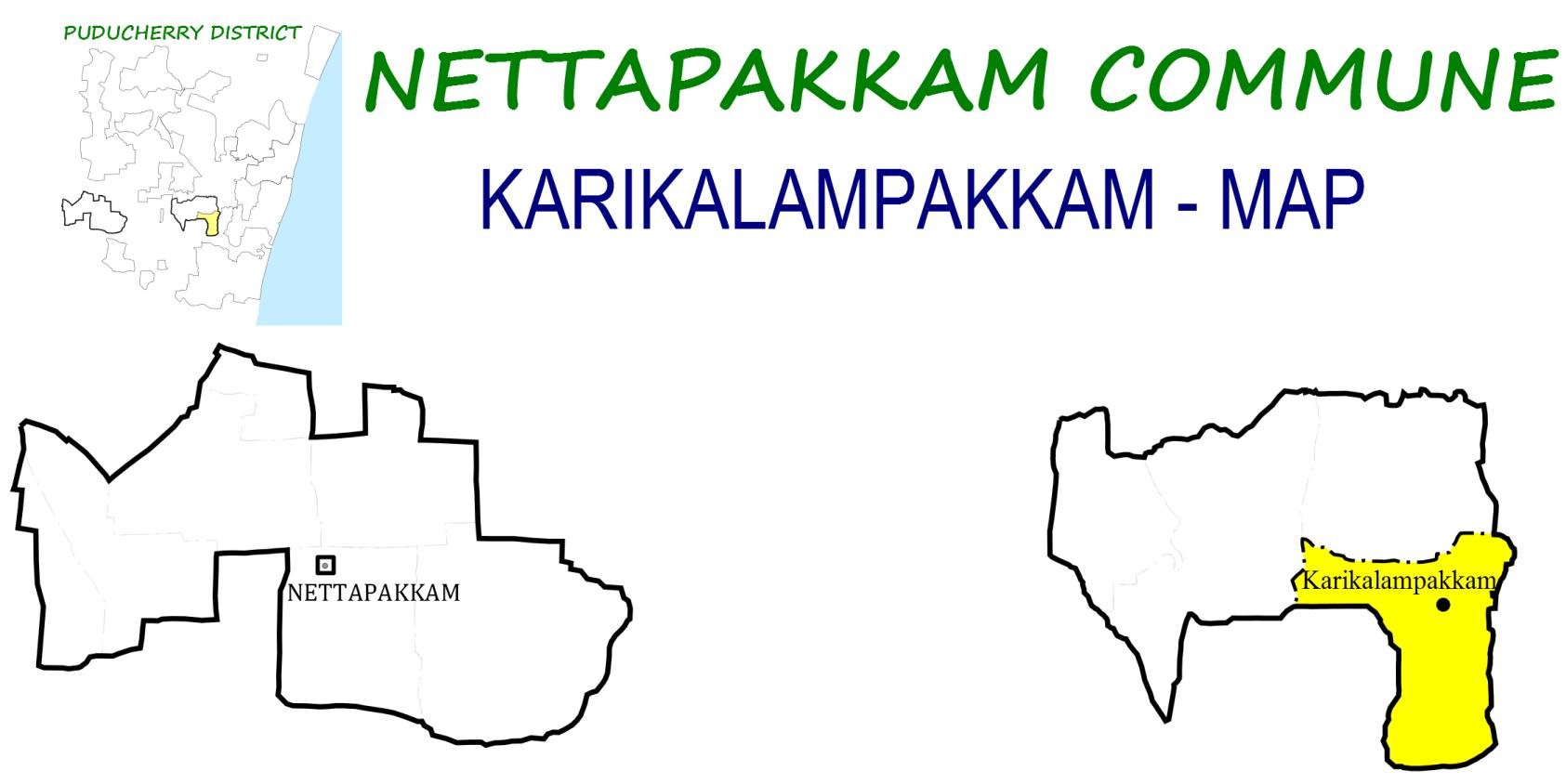
Karikalampakkam, Nettapakkam Commune

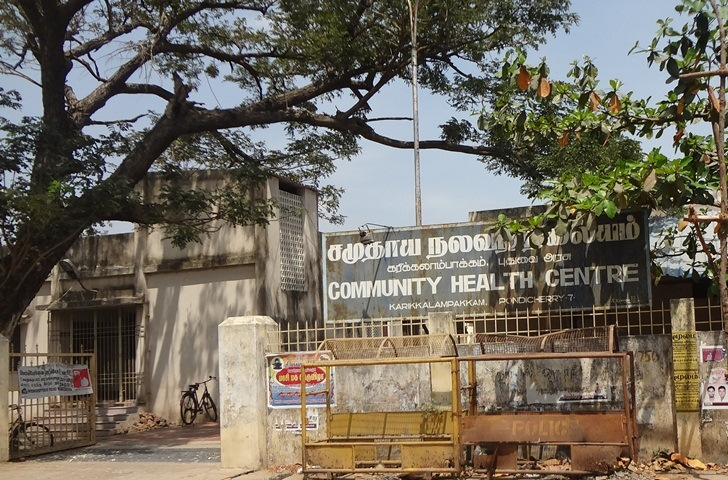
Community Health Centre, Karikalampakkam

Karikalampakkam is a panchayat village in Nettapakkam Commune in the Union Territory of Puducherry, India. It is also a revenue village under Nettapakkam firka.

== Geography ==
Karikalampakkam is bordered by Chellancherry village (Tamil Nadu) in the west, Korkadu in the north, Pudukkadai village (Tamil Nadu) in the east and Malattar and Kumaramangalam village (Tamil Nadu) in the south.

== Politics ==
Karikalampakkam is a part of Embalam (Union Territory Assembly constituency) which comes under Puducherry (Lok Sabha constituency)
