= Kariyamanickam =

- Village
- Location in Puducherry, India Kariyamanickam (India)
- Coordinates: 11.870984°N 79.628477°E
- Country: India
- State: Puducherry
- District: Pondicherry
- Taluk: Bahour
- Commune: Nettapakkam

Languages
  - Official: French, Tamil, English
- Time zone: UTC+5:30 (IST)
- PIN: 605 106
- Telephone code: 0413
- Vehicle registration: PY-01
- Sex ratio: 50% ♂/♀

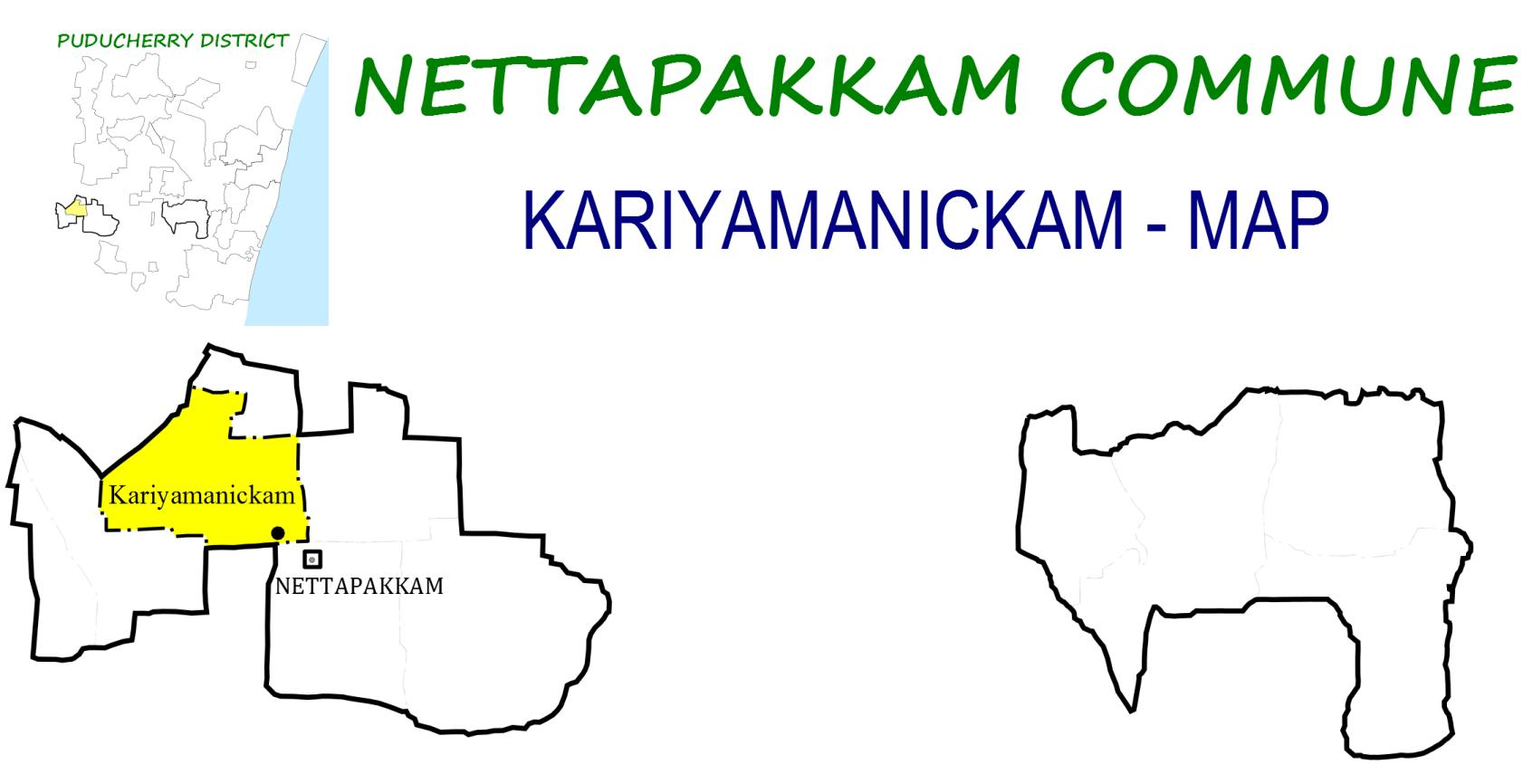
Kariyamanickam, Nettapakkam Commune

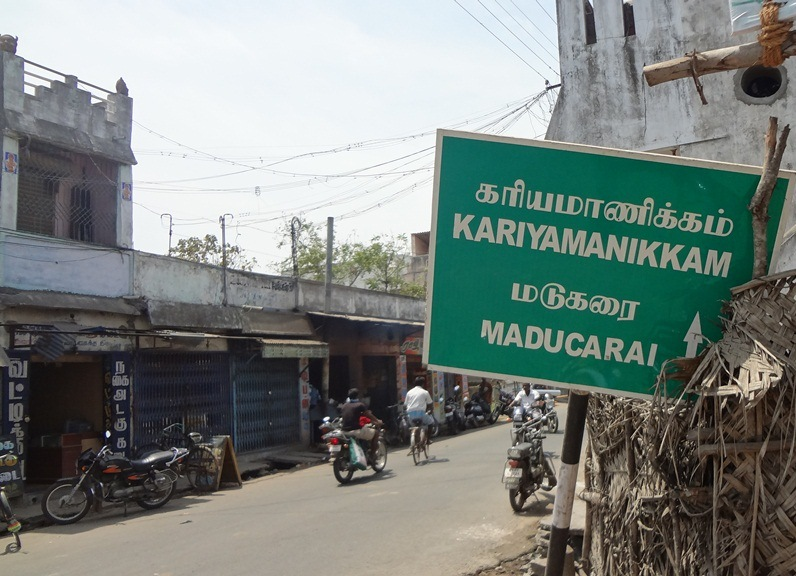
Kariyamanickam

Kariyamanickam is a panchayat village in Nettapakkam Commune in the Union Territory of Puducherry, India. It is also a revenue village under Nettapakkam firka. Molapakkam is a part of Kariyamanickam village.

== Geography ==
Kariyamanickam is bordered by Maducarai in the west, Sooramangalam in the north, Earipakkam in the east and Chokkampattu village, (Tamil Nadu) in the south

== Transport ==
Kariyamanickam is located at 28 km. from Pondicherry. Kariyamanickam can be reached directly by any bus running between Pondicherry and Maducarai.

== Road Network ==
Kariyamanickam is connected to Pondicherry by Mangalam - Maducarai State Highway (RC-19). Kariyamanickam is also connected by Frontier State Highway (RC-21).

== Politics ==
Kariyamanickam is a part of Nettapakkam (Union Territory Assembly constituency) which comes under Puducherry (Lok Sabha constituency).
