= Embalam Assembly constituency =

Constituency of the Puducherry legislative assembly in India

Coordinates: 11.872°N 79.715°E

Embalam
- Constituency No. 21 for the Puducherry Legislative Assembly
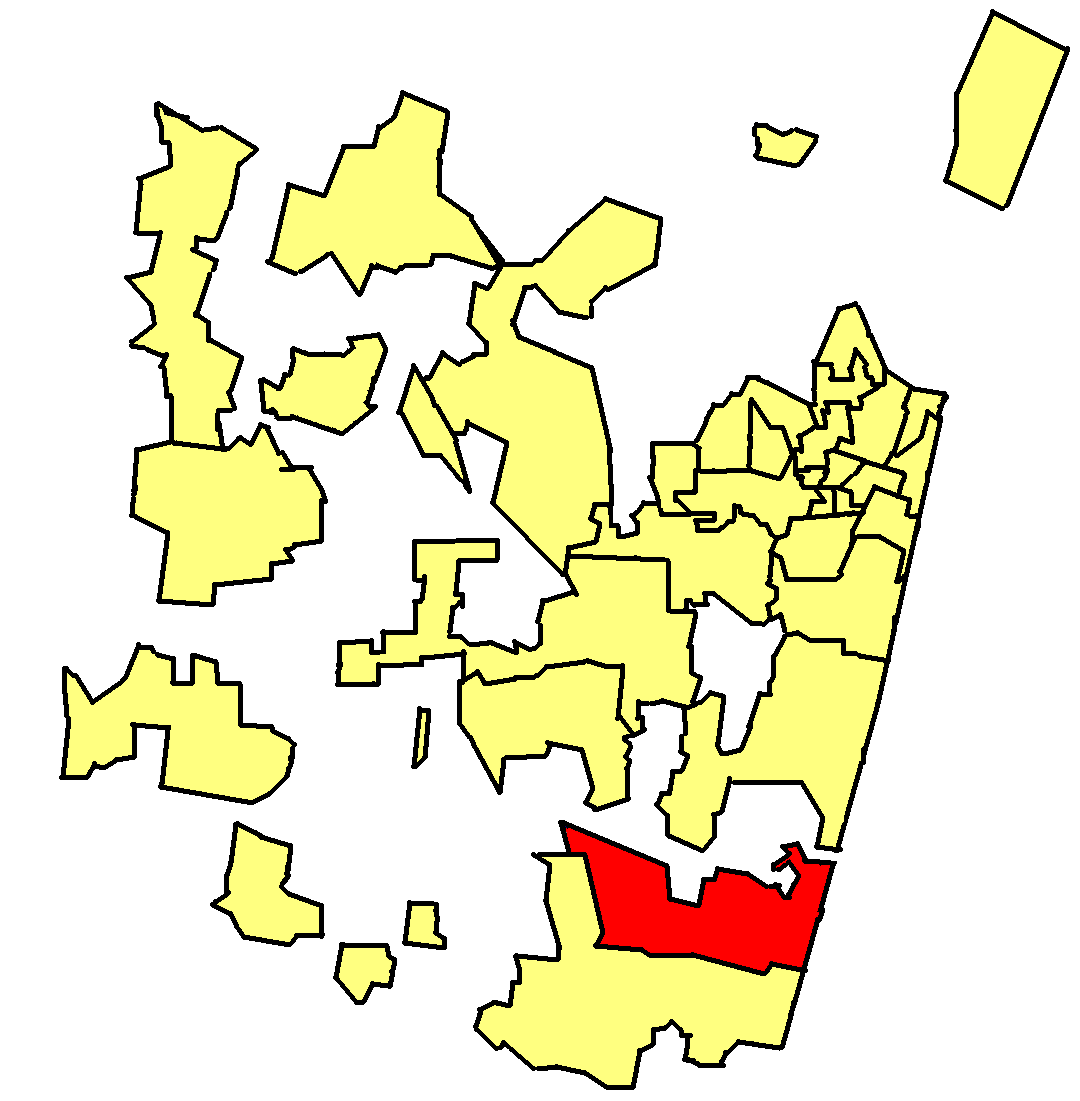

Constituency details
- Country: India
- Region: South India
- Union Territory: Puducherry
- District: Puducherry
- Lok Sabha constituency: Puducherry
- Established: 1964
- Total electors: 34,810
- Reservation: SC

Member of Legislative Assembly
- 16th Puducherry Legislative Assembly
- Incumbent U. Lakshmikandhan
- Party: AINRC
- Alliance: NDA
- Elected year: 2021

Embalam is a legislative assembly constituency in the Union territory of Puducherry in India. Embalam Assembly constituency was part of Puducherry Lok Sabha constituency. This assembly constituency is reserved for SC candidates.

== Segments ==
1. Embalam
2. Sembiyapalayam
3. Korkadu
4. Karikalampakkam
5. Aranganur
6. Kirumampakkam
7. Pillaiarkuppam
8. Seliamedu

== Members of the Legislative Assembly ==
| Election | Member | Party |
|---|---|---|
| 1964 | P. Angammal | Indian National Congress |
| 1969 | M. Veerammal | Indian National Congress |
| 1974 | G. Murugesan | Indian National Congress |
| 1977 | K. Sivaloganathan | All India Anna Dravida Munnetra Kazhagam |
| 1980 | G. Murugesan | Indian National Congress |
| 1985 | K. Anbalagan | All India Anna Dravida Munnetra Kazhagam |
| 1990 | K. Deivanayagam | Janata Dal |
| 1991 | K. Pakkiri Ammal | Indian National Congress |
| 1996 | R. Rajaraman | Janata Dal |
| 2001 | N. Gangadaran | Indian National Congress |
| 2006 | R. Rajaraman | Dravida Munnetra Kazhagam |
| 2011 | P. Rajavelu | All India N.R. Congress |
| 2016 | M. Kandaswamy | Indian National Congress |
| 2021 | U. Lakshmikandhan | All India N.R. Congress |
| 2026 | E. Mohandoss | All India N.R. Congress |

== Election results ==
Vote share of winning candidates
| 2026 | 50.78% |
| 2021 | 50.85% |
| 2016 | 66.05% |
| 2011 | 51.95% |
| 2006 | 40.56% |
| 2001 | 25.44% |
| 1996 | 62.73% |
| 1991 | 37.57% |
| 1990 | 36.96% |
| 1985 | 51.03% |
| 1980 | 68.30% |
| 1977 | 36.55% |
| 1974 | 47.13% |
| 1969 | 55.69% |
| 1964 | 79.83% |

=== Assembly Election 2026 ===
2026 Puducherry Legislative Assembly election: Embalam
| Party | Candidate | Votes | % | ±% |
|---|---|---|---|---|
| AINRC | E. Mohandoss | 16,017 | 50.78 | |
| INC | J. Kandasamy | 11,956 | 37.91 | |
| TVK | V. Tamizh Selvan | 2,708 | 8.59 | New |
| NOTA | NOTA | 187 | 0.59 | |
| Margin of victory | | 4061 | | |
| Turnout | | 31542 | | |
| Rejected ballots | | | | |
| Registered electors | | 32,865 | | |
| AINRC hold | | Swing | | |

=== Assembly Election 2021 ===
2021 Puducherry Legislative Assembly election: Embalam
| Party | Candidate | Votes | % | ±% |
|---|---|---|---|---|
| AINRC | U. Lakshmikandhan | 15,624 | 50.85% | |
| INC | M. Kandaswamy | 13,384 | 43.56% | −22.49% |
| MNM | N. Somanathan | 618 | 2.01% | |
| NOTA | Nota | 193 | 0.63% | −0.53% |
| Margin of victory | | 2,240 | 7.29% | −31.76% |
| Turnout | | 30,723 | 88.76% | −2.63% |
| Registered electors | | 34,614 | | 10.28% |
| AINRC gain from INC | | Swing | -15.20% | |

=== Assembly Election 2016 ===
2016 Puducherry Legislative Assembly election: Embalam
| Party | Candidate | Votes | % | ±% |
|---|---|---|---|---|
| INC | M. Kandaswamy | 18,945 | 66.05% | 19.99% |
| AINRC | U. Lakshmikandhan | 7,745 | 27.00% | |
| AIADMK | K. Govindharasu | 1,193 | 4.16% | |
| NOTA | None of the Above | 333 | 1.16% | |
| DMDK | S. Steeban | 135 | 0.47% | |
| Margin of victory | | 11,200 | 39.05% | 33.15% |
| Turnout | | 28,682 | 91.38% | −1.22% |
| Registered electors | | 31,386 | | 16.75% |
| INC gain from AINRC | | Swing | 14.10% | |

=== Assembly Election 2011 ===
2011 Puducherry Legislative Assembly election: Embalam
| Party | Candidate | Votes | % | ±% |
|---|---|---|---|---|
| AINRC | P. Rajavelu | 12,933 | 51.95% | |
| INC | M. Kandaswamy | 11,465 | 46.06% | |
| Independent | N. Ethirajan | 351 | 1.41% | |
| CPI(ML)L | J. Sactivelou | 144 | 0.58% | |
| Margin of victory | | 1,468 | 5.90% | 2.94% |
| Turnout | | 24,893 | 92.60% | 3.55% |
| Registered electors | | 26,882 | | 34.71% |
| AINRC gain from DMK | | Swing | 11.39% | |

=== Assembly Election 2006 ===
2006 Pondicherry Legislative Assembly election: Embalam
| Party | Candidate | Votes | % | ±% |
|---|---|---|---|---|
| DMK | R. Rajaraman | 7,208 | 40.56% | 19.47% |
| Independent | L. Periyasamy | 6,683 | 37.61% | |
| AIADMK | Su. Pavanan | 3,596 | 20.24% | 11.35% |
| DMDK | K. Karunanithi | 182 | 1.02% | |
| BJP | V. Gothandapani | 96 | 0.54% | |
| Margin of victory | | 525 | 2.95% | −1.39% |
| Turnout | | 17,770 | 89.05% | 14.18% |
| Registered electors | | 19,955 | | 2.10% |
| DMK gain from INC | | Swing | 15.12% | |

=== Assembly Election 2001 ===
2001 Pondicherry Legislative Assembly election: Embalam
| Party | Candidate | Votes | % | ±% |
|---|---|---|---|---|
| INC | N. Gangadaran | 3,723 | 25.44% | −0.63% |
| DMK | S. Palanivelu | 3,087 | 21.10% | 13.22% |
| Independent | L. Periyasamy | 2,780 | 19.00% | |
| Independent | R. Rajaraman | 1,852 | 12.66% | |
| AIADMK | M. Nagamany | 1,301 | 8.89% | |
| MDMK | P. Muthukrishnan | 630 | 4.31% | |
| Independent | D. Janakiraman | 621 | 4.24% | |
| Puratchi Bharatham | K. Sivaloganathane | 282 | 1.93% | |
| LJP | S. Parkunan | 142 | 0.97% | |
| CPI(ML)L | R. Selvakumar | 135 | 0.92% | |
| Independent | S. Candavelou | 80 | 0.55% | |
| Margin of victory | | 636 | 4.35% | −32.32% |
| Turnout | | 14,633 | 74.87% | 1.87% |
| Registered electors | | 19,544 | | 8.80% |
| INC gain from JD | | Swing | -12.13% | |

=== Assembly Election 1996 ===
1996 Pondicherry Legislative Assembly election: Embalam
| Party | Candidate | Votes | % | ±% |
|---|---|---|---|---|
| JD | R. Rajaraman | 8,311 | 62.73% | |
| INC | K. Pakkiriammal | 3,454 | 26.07% | −11.50% |
| DMK | P. Muthukrishnan | 1,043 | 7.87% | |
| JP | S. Parkunan | 140 | 1.06% | |
| Independent | A. Thiagarajan | 104 | 0.79% | |
| Independent | P. Kathiravan | 90 | 0.68% | |
| Margin of victory | | 4,857 | 36.66% | 22.39% |
| Turnout | | 13,248 | 78.31% | 5.31% |
| Registered electors | | 17,964 | | 10.14% |
| JD gain from INC | | Swing | 25.16% | |

=== Assembly Election 1991 ===
1991 Pondicherry Legislative Assembly election: Embalam
| Party | Candidate | Votes | % | ±% |
|---|---|---|---|---|
| INC | K. Pakkiri Ammal | 4,171 | 37.57% | |
| JD | R. Rajaraman | 2,587 | 23.30% | |
| Independent | R. Kumarselvan | 2,189 | 19.72% | |
| Independent | Siva Loganathan | 1,309 | 11.79% | |
| PMK | M. A. Mallika | 735 | 6.62% | 0.31% |
| JP | S. Parkunan | 111 | 1.00% | |
| Margin of victory | | 1,584 | 14.27% | 5.51% |
| Turnout | | 11,102 | 73.00% | −5.98% |
| Registered electors | | 16,310 | | 0.54% |
| INC gain from JD | | Swing | 0.61% | |

=== Assembly Election 1990 ===
1990 Pondicherry Legislative Assembly election: Embalam
| Party | Candidate | Votes | % | ±% |
|---|---|---|---|---|
| JD | K. Deivanayagam | 4,669 | 36.96% | |
| Independent | K. Sivaloganathan | 3,563 | 28.20% | |
| AIADMK | K. Anbalagan | 3,265 | 25.84% | −25.19% |
| PMK | M. P. Datchanamurthy | 797 | 6.31% | |
| JP | T. Kathavarayan | 168 | 1.33% | |
| Lok Dal (B) | S. Arimuthu | 92 | 0.73% | |
| Independent | C. Saminathan | 80 | 0.63% | |
| Margin of victory | | 1,106 | 8.75% | 6.69% |
| Turnout | | 12,634 | 78.97% | −1.82% |
| Registered electors | | 16,223 | | 46.42% |
| JD gain from AIADMK | | Swing | -14.07% | |

=== Assembly Election 1985 ===
1985 Pondicherry Legislative Assembly election: Embalam
| Party | Candidate | Votes | % | ±% |
|---|---|---|---|---|
| AIADMK | K. Anbalagan | 4,509 | 51.03% | 26.97% |
| DMK | K. Siva Loganathan | 4,327 | 48.97% | |
| Margin of victory | | 182 | 2.06% | −42.18% |
| Turnout | | 8,836 | 80.79% | −2.78% |
| Registered electors | | 11,080 | | 19.41% |
| AIADMK gain from INC(I) | | Swing | -17.27% | |

=== Assembly Election 1980 ===
1980 Pondicherry Legislative Assembly election: Embalam
| Party | Candidate | Votes | % | ±% |
|---|---|---|---|---|
| INC(I) | G. Murugesan | 5,033 | 68.30% | |
| AIADMK | N. Ramajayam | 1,773 | 24.06% | −12.49% |
| Independent | K. Sivaloganathan | 487 | 6.61% | |
| Independent | N. Arikrishnan | 76 | 1.03% | |
| Margin of victory | | 3,260 | 44.24% | 40.62% |
| Turnout | | 7,369 | 83.58% | 6.20% |
| Registered electors | | 9,279 | | 5.67% |
| INC(I) gain from AIADMK | | Swing | 31.75% | |

=== Assembly Election 1977 ===
1977 Pondicherry Legislative Assembly election: Embalam
| Party | Candidate | Votes | % | ±% |
|---|---|---|---|---|
| AIADMK | K. Sivaloganathan | 2,442 | 36.55% | |
| INC | G. Murugesan | 2,200 | 32.92% | −14.20% |
| DMK | G. Thangarasu | 1,093 | 16.36% | −13.57% |
| JP | N. K. Ayyanar | 947 | 14.17% | |
| Margin of victory | | 242 | 3.62% | −13.58% |
| Turnout | | 6,682 | 77.37% | −10.01% |
| Registered electors | | 8,781 | | 9.79% |
| AIADMK gain from INC | | Swing | -10.58% | |

=== Assembly Election 1974 ===
1974 Pondicherry Legislative Assembly election: Embalam
| Party | Candidate | Votes | % | ±% |
|---|---|---|---|---|
| INC | G. Murugesan | 3,140 | 47.13% | −8.56% |
| DMK | Siva Loganathan | 1,994 | 29.93% | −14.39% |
| CPI | P. S. Perumal | 1,529 | 22.95% | |
| Margin of victory | | 1,146 | 17.20% | 5.83% |
| Turnout | | 6,663 | 87.38% | 3.97% |
| Registered electors | | 7,998 | | −1.44% |
| INC hold | | Swing | -8.56% | |

=== Assembly Election 1969 ===
1969 Pondicherry Legislative Assembly election: Embalam
| Party | Candidate | Votes | % | ±% |
|---|---|---|---|---|
| INC | M. Veerammal | 3,682 | 55.69% | −24.14% |
| DMK | M. Veerappan | 2,930 | 44.31% | |
| Margin of victory | | 752 | 11.37% | −48.29% |
| Turnout | | 6,612 | 83.41% | 4.41% |
| Registered electors | | 8,115 | | −0.05% |
| INC hold | | Swing | -24.14% | |

=== Assembly Election 1964 ===
1964 Pondicherry Legislative Assembly election: Embalam
| Party | Candidate | Votes | % | ±% |
|---|---|---|---|---|
| INC | P. Angammal | 4,924 | 79.83% | |
| IPF | S. Andavan | 1,244 | 20.17% | |
| Margin of victory | | 3,680 | 59.66% | |
| Turnout | | 6,168 | 79.00% | |
| Registered electors | | 8,119 | | |
| INC win (new seat) | | | | |

== See also ==
- List of constituencies of the Puducherry Legislative Assembly
- Puducherry district
