= Mangalam, Puducherry =

Mangalam
- Village
- Location in Puducherry, India Mangalam (India)
- Coordinates: 11.893378°N 79.7359157°E
- Country: India
- State: Puducherry
- District: Pondicherry
- Taluk: Villianur
- Commune: Villianur

Population (2011)
  - Total: 3,255

Languages
  - Official: Tamil, English, French
- Time zone: UTC+5:30 (IST)
- PIN: 605 110
- STD code: 0413
- Vehicle registration: PY-01
- Sex ratio: 50% ♂/♀

Mangalam is a panchayat village in Villianur Commune in the Union Territory of Puducherry, India.

== Geography ==
Mangalam is bordered by Vadamangalam in the west, Sangarabarani River in the north, Uruvayaru in the east and Sembiapalayam village in the south.

== Transport ==
Sembiampalayam is located at 11 km from Pondicherry. Mangalam can be reached directly by any bus running between Pondicherry and Maducarai (Madukarai).

== Road Network ==
Mangalam is connected to Pondicherry by Mangalam - Maducarai State Highway (RC-19)

== Politics ==
Mangalam is a part of Mangalam (Union Territory Assembly constituency) which comes under Puducherry (Lok Sabha constituency). A newly created Assembly constituency, the first election was held in 2011.

== Places ==
- Mangalam Police Station
- Government Higher Secondary School
- Mariyamman Temple
