= M. Kandaswamy (Puducherry politician) =

Indian politician

M. Kandaswamy is an Indian politician belonging to the Indian National Congress. He was elected from the Embalam constituency in 2016 Puducherry Legislative Assembly election. He became the minister of Social Welfare, Women and Child Development, Adi-Dravidar Welfare, Backward Classes Welfare, Co-operation, Civil Supplies & Consumer Affairs, Labour and Employment, Pollution Control, Science, Technology and Environment and Port in V. Narayanasamy government.
