= Sembiapalayam =

Sembiyapalayam
- Village
- Location in Puducherry, India Sembiyapalayam (India)
- Coordinates: 11.883766°N 79.731147°E
- Country: India
- State: Puducherry
- District: Pondicherry
- Taluk: Bahour
- Commune: Nettapakkam

Languages
  - Official: French, Tamil, English
- Time zone: UTC+5:30 (IST)
- PIN: 605 110
- Telephone code: 0413
- Vehicle registration: PY-01
- Sex ratio: 50% ♂/♀

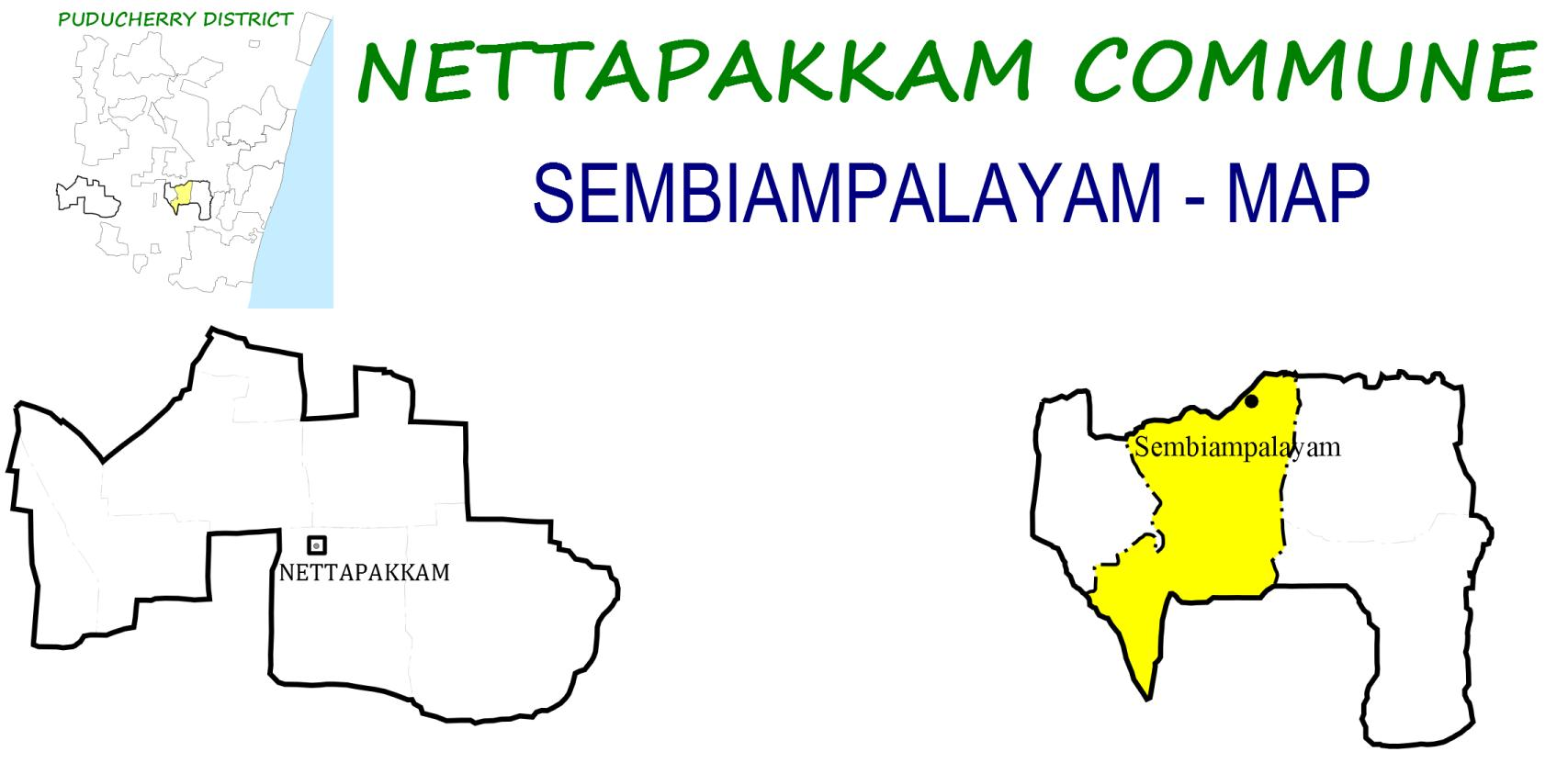
Sembiampalayam, Nettapakkam Commune

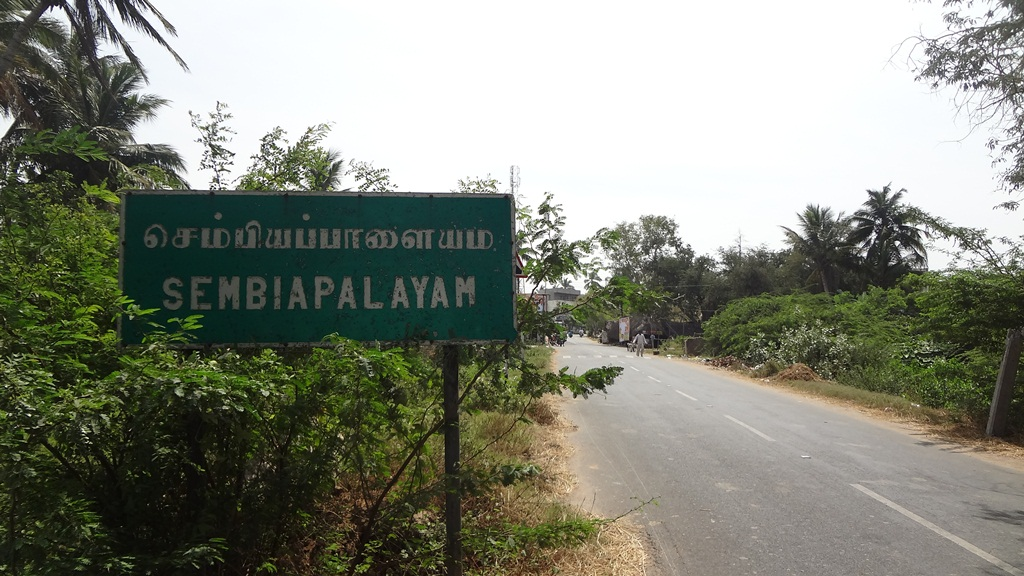
Sembiapalayam

Sembiapalayam is a panchayat village in Nettapakkam Commune in the Union Territory of Puducherry, India.

== Geography ==
Sembiampalayam is bordered by Embalam in the west, Sathamangalam in the north, Korkadu in the east and Chellancherry village (Tamil Nadu) in the south.

== Transport ==
Sembiampalayam is located at 13 km. from Pondicherry. Sembiapalayam can be reached directly by any bus running between Pondicherry and Maducarai running via Mangalam.

== Road Network ==
Sembiampalayam is connected to Pondicherry by Mangalam-Maducarai State Highway (RC-19). Also Kizhur Road (RC-30) starts from Sembiampalayam.

== Politics ==
Sembiampalayam is a part of Embalam (Union Territory Assembly constituency) which comes under Puducherry (Lok Sabha constituency)
