= Embalam =

- Village
- Location in Puducherry, India Embalam (India)
- Coordinates: 11.871215°N 79.713514°E
- Country: India
- State: Puducherry
- District: Pondicherry
- Taluk: Bahour
- Commune: Nettapakkam

Languages
  - Official: French, Tamil, English
- Time zone: UTC+5:30 (IST)
- PIN: 605 106
- Telephone code: 0413
- Vehicle registration: PY-01
- Sex ratio: 50% ♂/♀

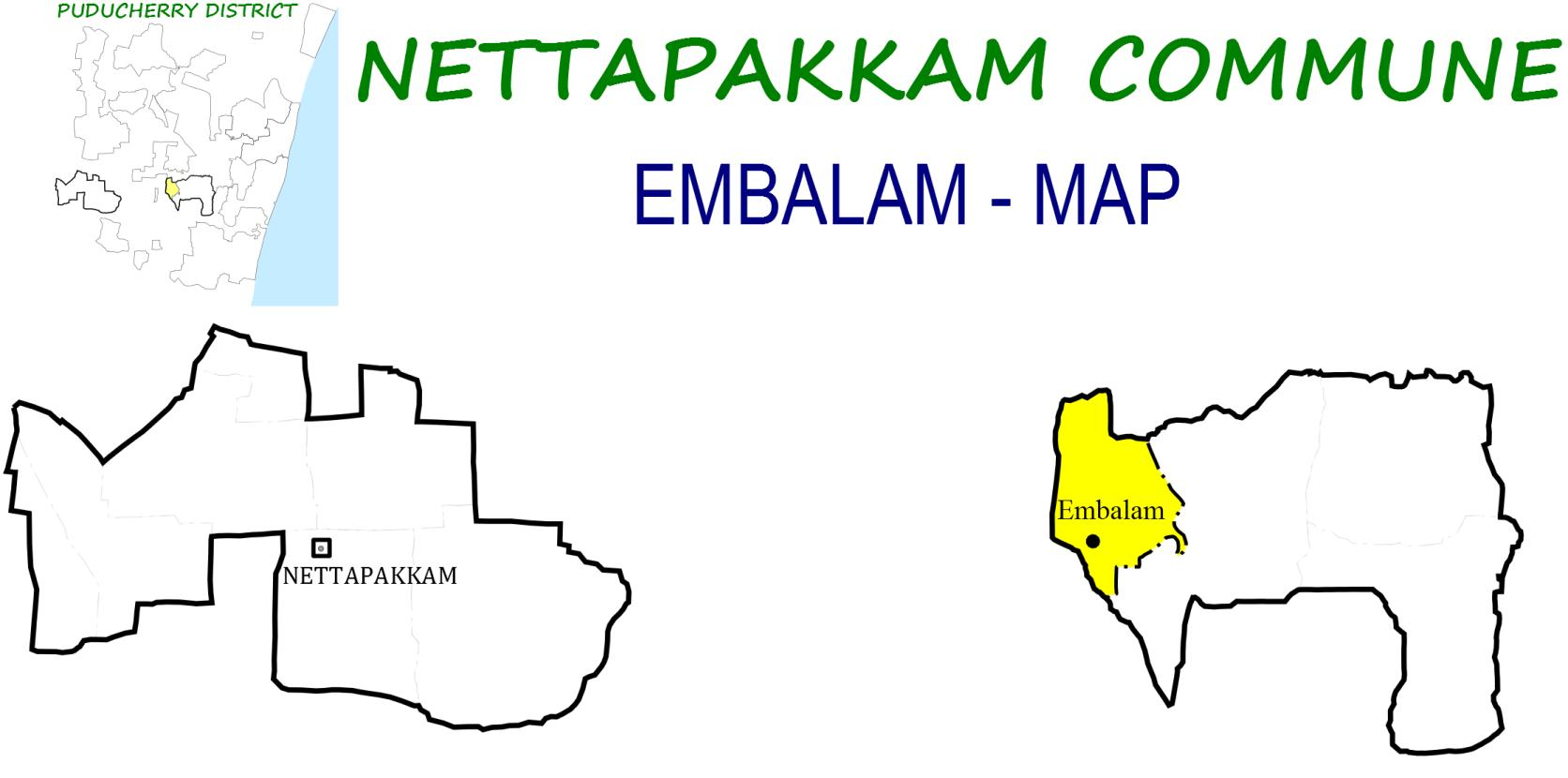
Embalam, Nettapakkam Commune

Embalam is a panchayat village in Nettapakkam Commune in the Union Territory of Puducherry, India.

== Geography ==
Embalam is bordered by Nallathur village (Tamil Nadu) in the west, Sathamangalam in the north, Sembiapalayam in the east and Manaveli village (Tamil Nadu) in the south and south-west.

== Transport ==
Embalam is located at 18 km. from Pondicherry. Embalam can be reached directly by any bus running between Pondicherry and Maducarai via. Embalam. It is connected to Pondicherry by Thavalakuppam-Embalam (RC-20) State Highway. Also Mangalam-Maducarai State Highway (RC-19) passes through Embalam

== Politics ==
Embalam is a part of Embalam (Union Territory Assembly constituency) which comes under Puducherry (Lok Sabha constituency)

== Gallery ==
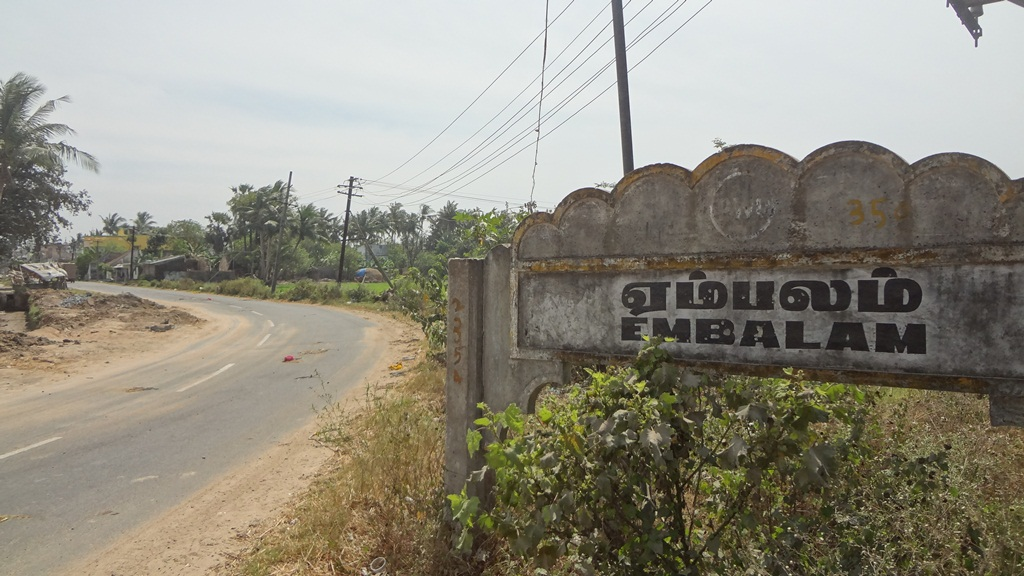
Way to Embalam

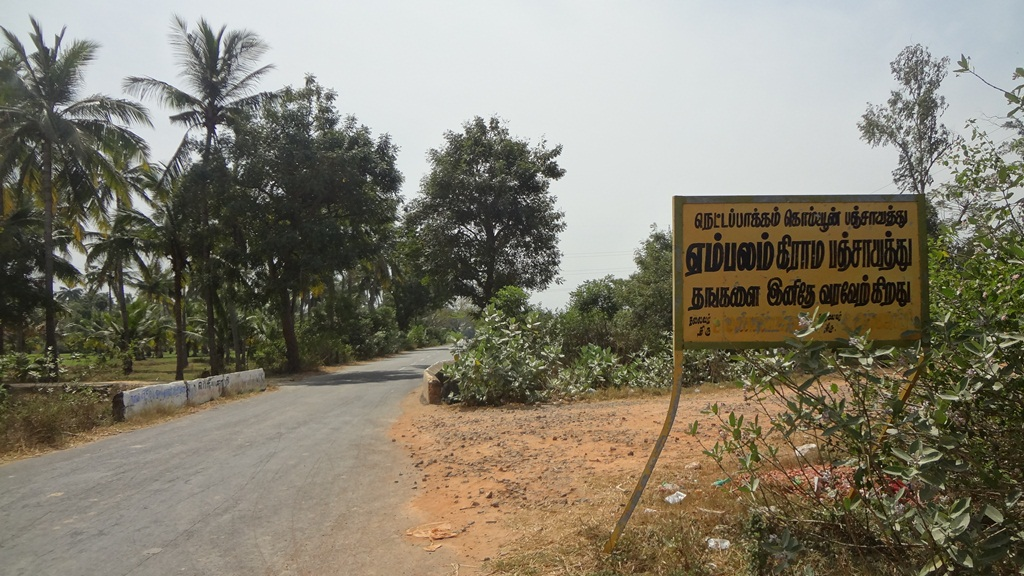
Embalam Village Panchayat
