= Malattar River =

River in Tamil Nadu, India

Coordinates: 11°50′N 79°49′E

Malattar is a river flowing in the Vellore district of the Indian state of Tamil Nadu.

== See also ==
- List of rivers of Tamil Nadu
