= Maducarai =

Maducarai Madukarai
- Village
- Nickname: Madukkarai
- Location in Puducherry, India Maducarai (India)
- Coordinates: 11.868947°N 79.605925°E
- Country: India
- State: Puducherry
- District: Pondicherry
- Taluk: Bahour
- Commune: Nettapakkam

Languages
  - Official: French, Tamil, English
- Time zone: UTC+5:30 (IST)
- PIN: 605 105
- Telephone code: 0413
- Vehicle registration: PY-01
- Sex ratio: 50% ♂/♀

Maducarai (மடுகரை) is a panchayat village in Nettapakkam Commune in the Union Territory of Puducherry, India. It is also a revenue village under Nettapakkam firka. Muducarai consists of two village panchayats namely Maducarai(East) and Maducarai(West).

== Geography ==
Maducarai is bordered by Kariamanickam in the east and rest of three sides bordered by Tamil Nadu villages.

== Transport ==
Maducarai is located at 32 km. from Pondicherry. Maducarai can be reached directly by any bus running between Pondicherry and Maducarai.

== Road Network ==
Maducarai is connected to Pondicherry by Mangalam - Maducarai State Highway (RC-19).

== Tourism ==
=== Marakaleswarar Temple ===
Marakaleswarar Temple is one of the ancient temple in Puducherry. It belongs to Chozha period.

== Freedom Fighters Arch ==
Freedom Fighters Centenary Year Memorial Arch is located on Siruvandhadu road. The pillars in the arch has the list of freedom fighters who fought for the merger of Pondicherry with the Indian Union.

== People from Maducarai ==
- V. Venkatasubha Reddiar, freedom fighter and politician, was a Chief minister of Pondicherry.
- V. Vaithilingam, politician, was a Chief minister of Pondicherry.
- M. D. R. Ramachandran, politician, was a Chief minister of Pondicherry.
- M. R. Subbaraya Gounder, politician, was a M.L.A during 1980 to 1983 of Pondicherry.

== Gallery ==
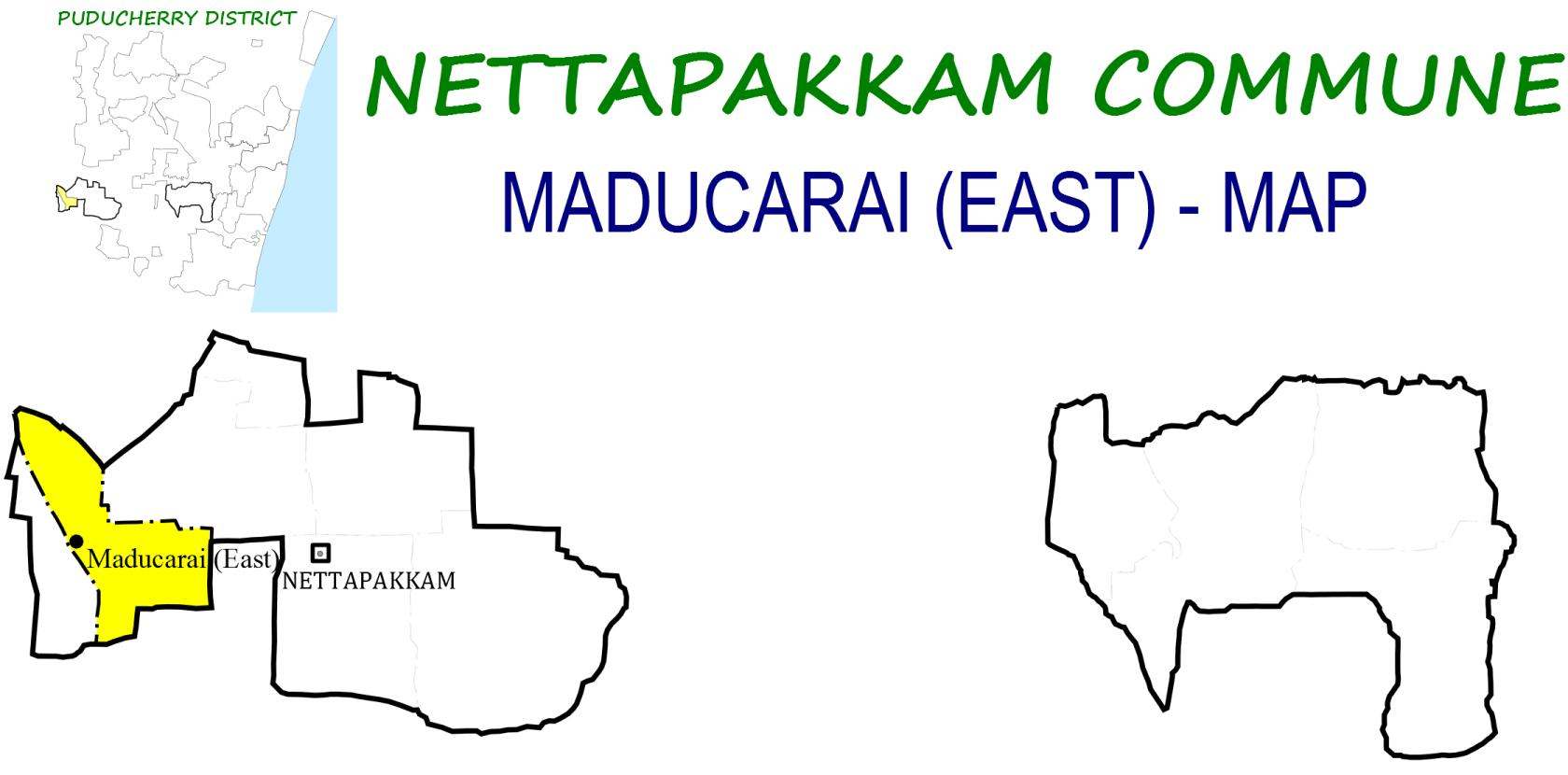
Map of Maducarai(East), Nettapakkam Commune

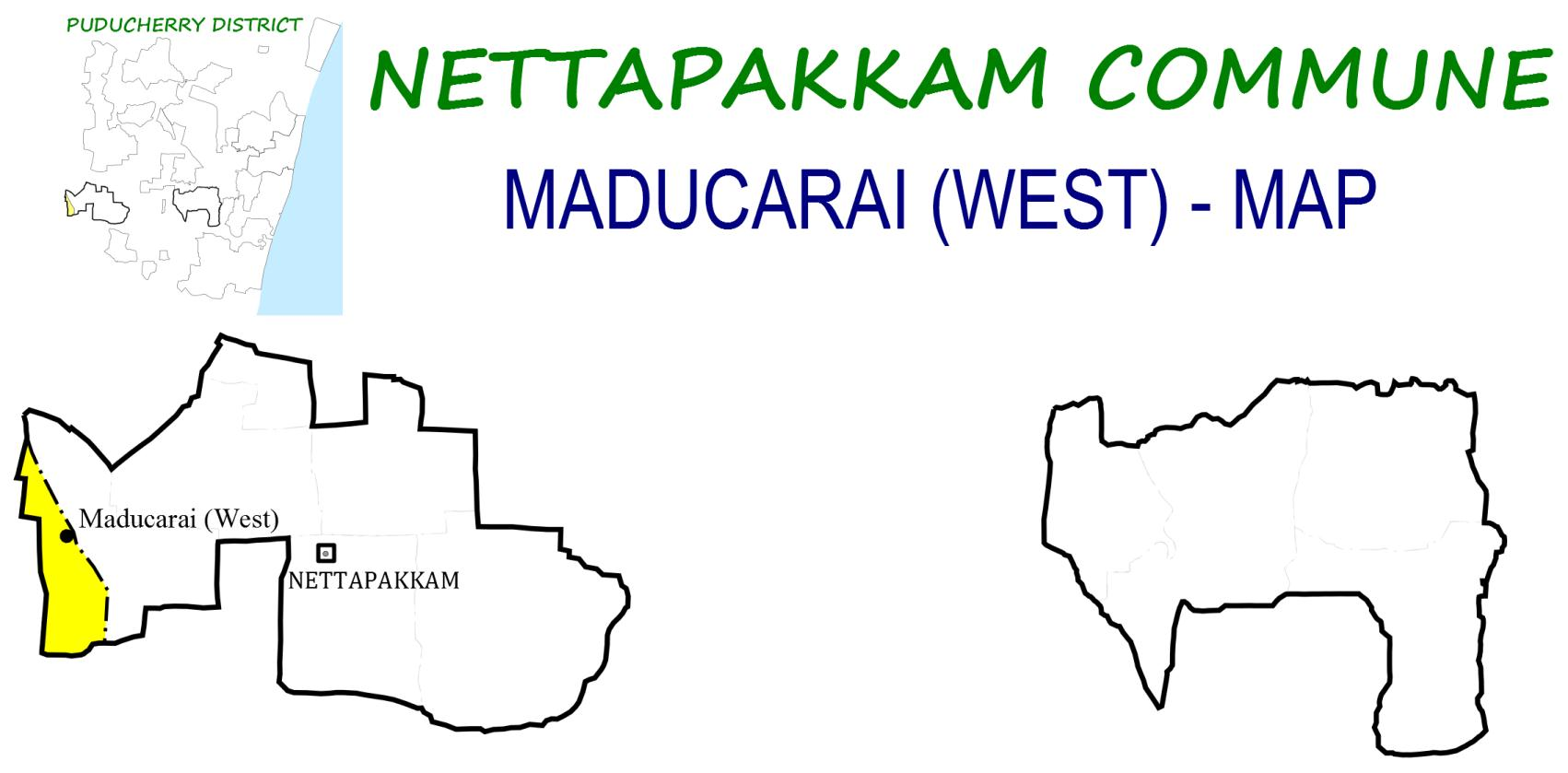
Map of Maducarai(West), Nettapakkam Commune

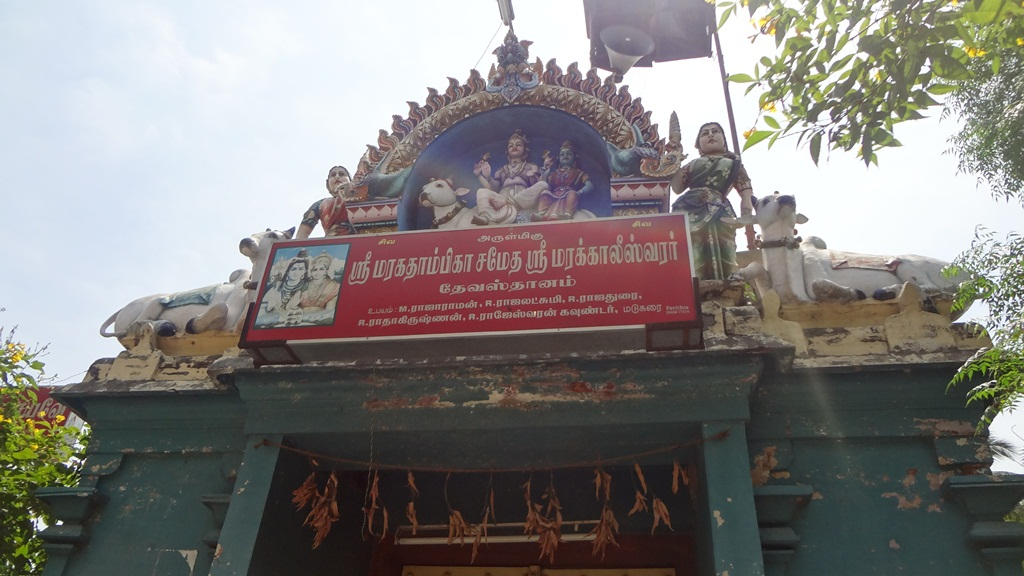
Marakkaaleeswarar Temple Entrance

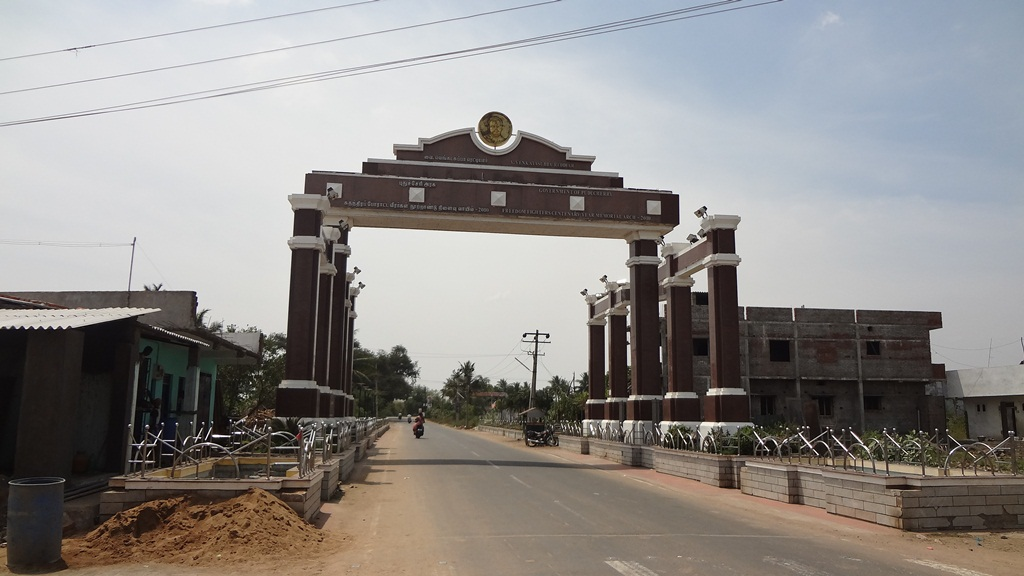
Freedom Fighters Centenary Year Memorial Arch

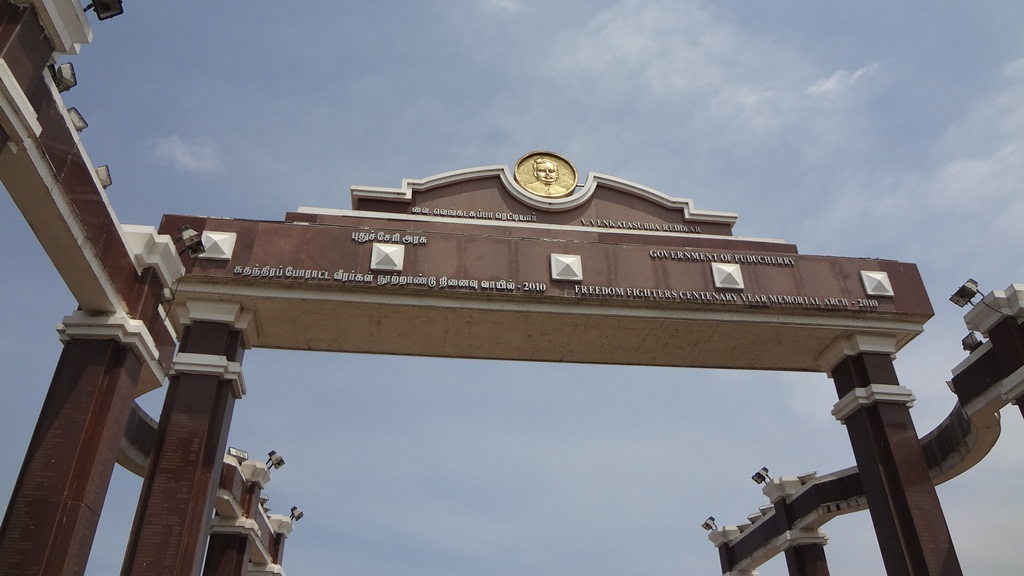
Freedom Fighters Centenary Year Memorial Arch- Close up

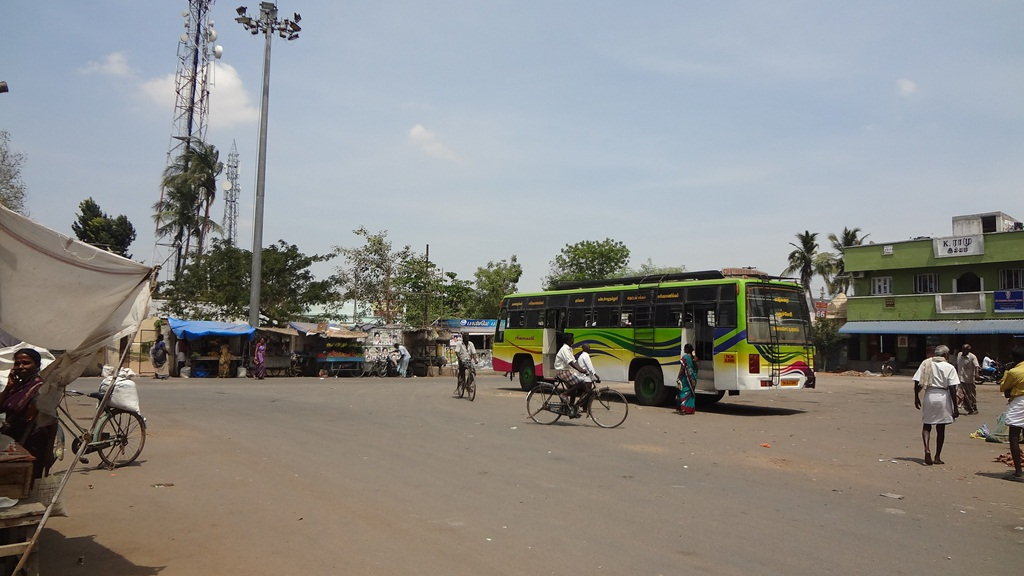
Maducarai Bus Stand

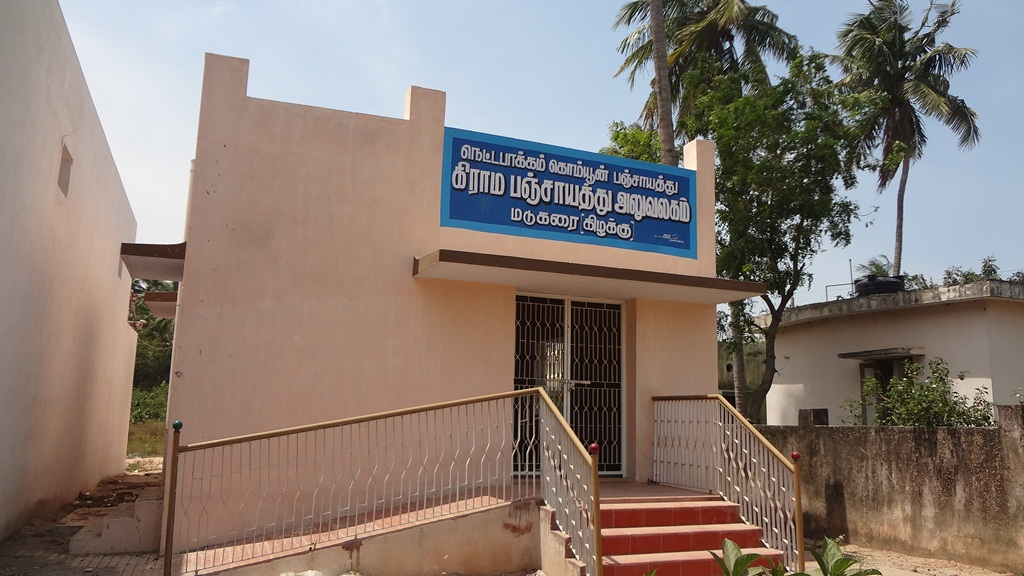
Maducarai (East) Village Panchayat Office

== Politics ==
Maducarai is a part of Nettapakkam (Union Territory Assembly constituency) which comes under Puducherry (Lok Sabha constituency)
