= Nettapakkam =

Nettapakkam Nedumpakkam
- Commune
- Location in Puducherry, India Nettapakkam (India)
- Coordinates: 11.866259°N 79.632726°E
- Country: India
- State: Puducherry
- District: Puducherry

Population (2001)
  - Total: 25,503

Languages
  - Official: French, Tamil, English
- Time zone: UTC+5:30 (IST)
- PIN: 605 106
- Telephone code: 0413
- Vehicle registration: PY-01
- Sex ratio: 50% ♂/♀

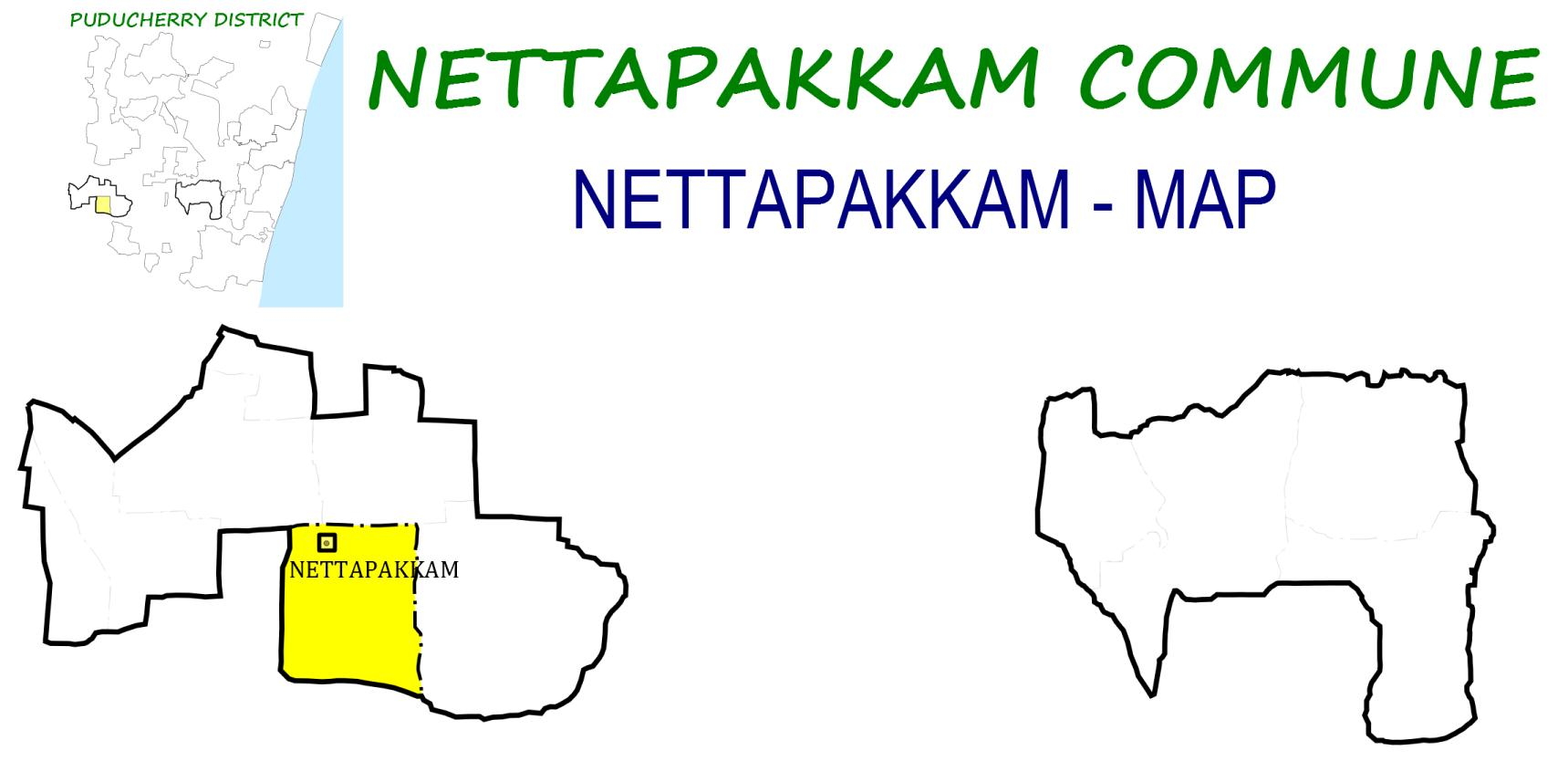
Nettapakkam Map

Nettapakkam is a Village, Commune and Assembly Constituency in the Union Territory of Puducherry, India. It consists of Nettapakkam Enclave and Embalam part of Nettapakkam Commune in the main Enclave of Puducherry. It forms a part of western border to the Union territory.

== History ==
Nettapakkam played a vital role in the merger of Puducherrry UT with India Union. It was at the Nettapakkam police station that the Tricolour was hoisted for the first time on 31 March 1954, by Socialist party leaders in favour of a merger with the Indian Union. Also an ancient Shiva temple exists here. The original name of Nettapakkam was Nedumpakkam, then as time passed it changed into Nettapakkam.

== Demographics ==
As of 2001 India census, Nettapakkam had a population of 25,503. Males constitute 50% of the population and females 50%. Nettapakkam has an average literacy rate of 81.49%, male literacy is 88.89%, and female literacy is 74.13%. In Nettapakkam, 10% of the population is under 6 years of age.

== Geography ==
Nettapakkam is 25 km. from Puducherry city. It is connected with Puducherry by Puducherry-Madukkarai Bus route.

== Road Network ==
Two RC Roads passes through Nettapakkam. They are

- Frontier Road (RC-21)
- Mangalam - Madukkarai Road (RC-19)

In fact Nettapakkam is located at the junction of RC-19 and RC-21

The roads in Nettapakkam leads to places such as,

- Madukarai
- Pakkam X Road
- Madagadipet

== Place of interest ==
=== Ramalingeshwar temple ===
Ramalingeshwar temple is located in the heart of Nettapakkam. This temple belongs to Chola period. In this temple a Special festival known as Kandarsashti thiruvizha along with soora samharam is celebrated every year for lord Selva Muthukumarasamy by the village people. Also car festival is celebrated for lord Shiva.

=== Schools ===
Nettapakkam has two government schools, one for primary and another for higher secondary (VI–XII) as government primary school and Kamban government higher secondary school.

=== Hospital ===
Nettapakkam has its own government health care centre.

=== Puducherry Western Entrance, Madukkarai ===
An entrance arch is built at Madukkarai on Siruvandadu Road. The pillar in the arch displays the Freedom fighter's name, who fought for the merger of Puducherry UT with the Indian Union.

The Nettapakkam commune has two specialized arch walls with Lion's covering the world (globe), it can be found on Nettapakkam entrance and also in kalmandapam entrance.
