= Moorthikuppam =

- Village
- Location in Puducherry, India Moorthikuppam (India)
- Coordinates: 11.7902°N 79.787264°E
- Country: India
- State: Puducherry
- District: Pondicherry
- Taluk: Bahour
- Commune: Bahour

Population (2001)
  - Total: 36,983

Languages
  - Official: French, Tamil, English
- Time zone: UTC+5:30 (IST)
- PIN: 605 106
- Telephone code: 0413
- Vehicle registration: PY-01
- Sex ratio: 50% ♂/♀

Moorthikuppam is a village in Bahour Commune of Bahour taluk in the Union Territory of Puducherry, India. It lies on Pudukuppam-Soriyankuppam road. Pannithittu-Pudukuppam road also connects Moorthikuppam. Moorthikuppam is a part of Pudukuppam Village Panchayat.

== Gallery ==
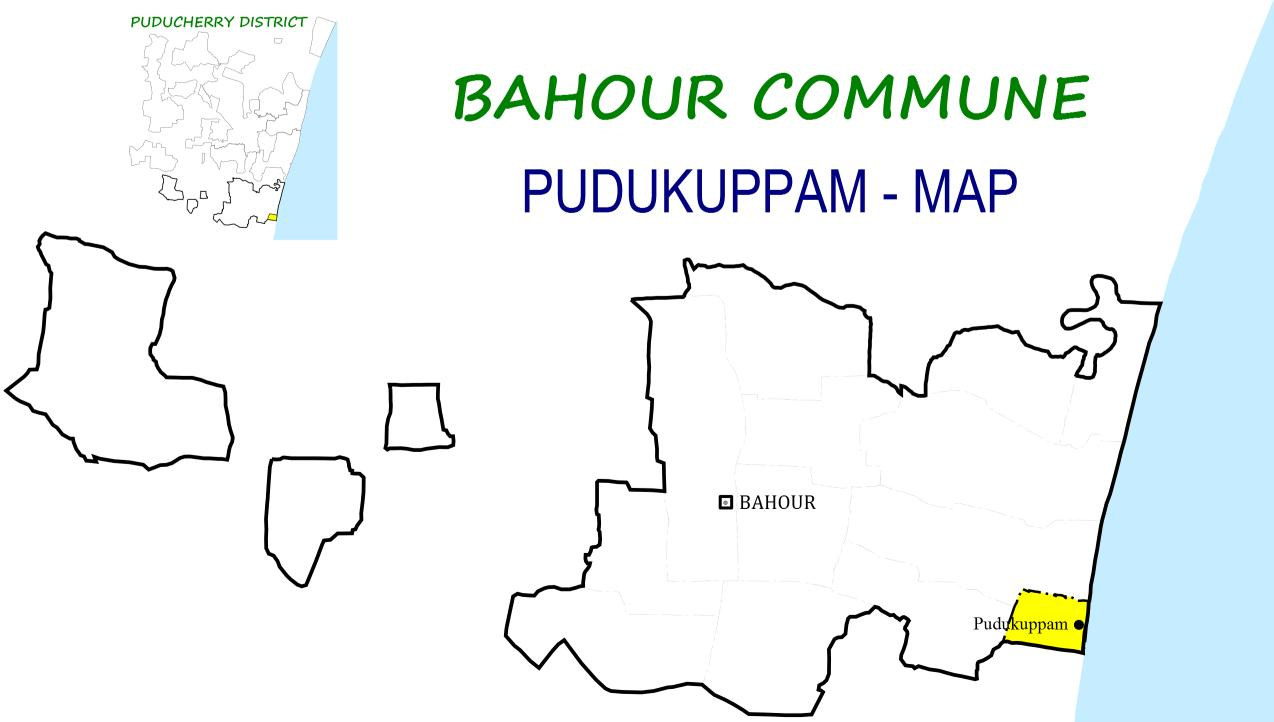
Map of Pudukuppam Village Panchayat
