= Bahour (East) =

Bahour(East)
- Village
- Location in Puducherry, India Bahour(East) (India)
- Coordinates: 11.806489°N 79.745378°E
- Country: India
- State: Puducherry
- District: Puducherry

Population (2001)
  - Total: 36,983

Languages
  - Official: French, Tamil, English
- Time zone: UTC+5:30 (IST)
- PIN: 607 402
- Telephone code: 0413
- Vehicle registration: PY-01
- Sex ratio: 50% ♂/♀

Bahour (East) is a village in Commune in the Union Territory of Puducherry, India. It consists of few areas of Bahour and the entire part of Bahourpet.

== Geography ==
Bahour (East) is bordered by Bahour(West) in the west, Kudiyiruppupalayam in the north, Manapattu, Krishnavaram in the east and Parikkalpattu in the south.

== Road Network ==
Kanniakoil–Bahour Road (RC-28) passes through Bahour(East). This road connects Bahour with National Highways-45A.

== Gallery ==
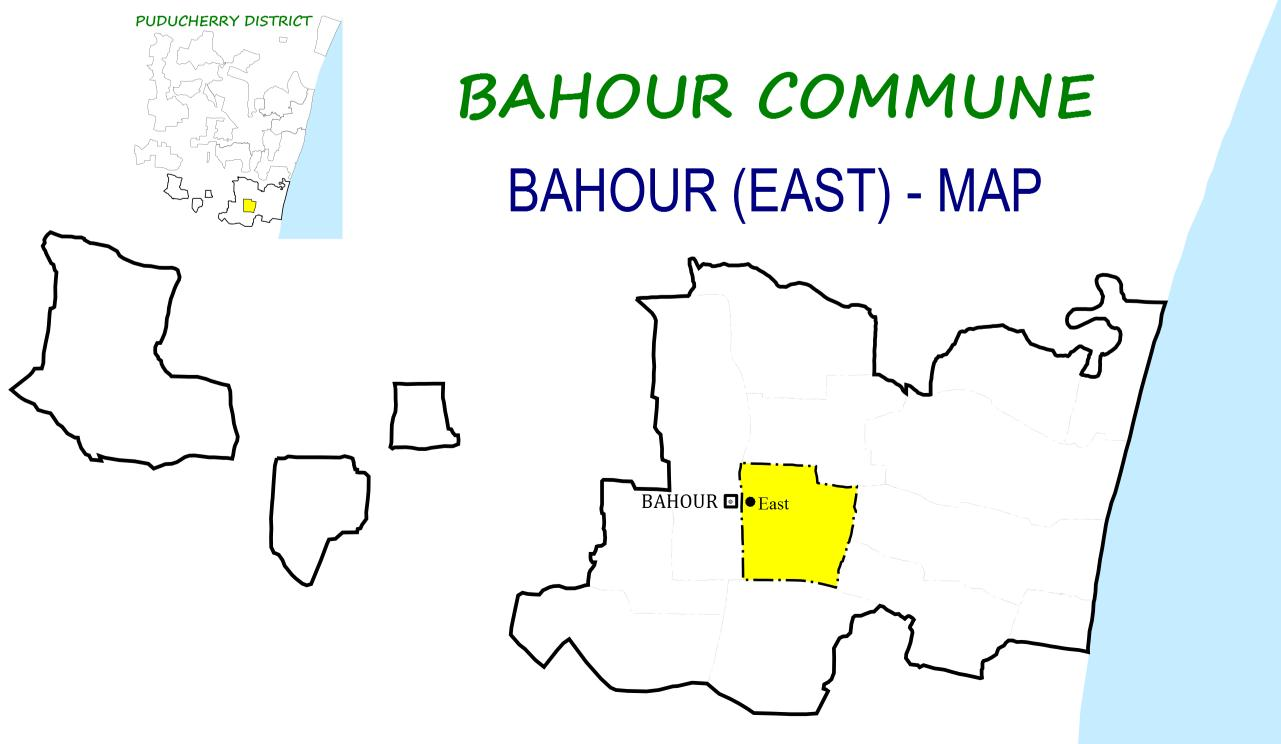
Map of Bahour(East) Village Panchayat

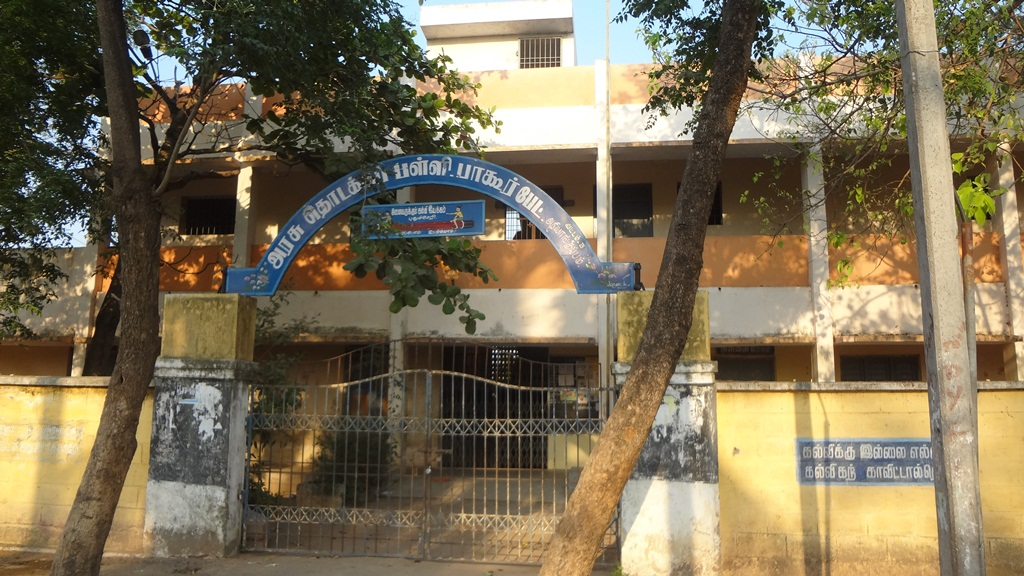
Government Primary School, Bahour Pet
