= Bahour firka =

Coordinates: 11°48′24.57″N 79°44′34.66″E

Bahour is one of the 3 Firkas of Bahour taluk in Pondicherry (North) Revenue Sub-division of the Indian union territory of Puducherry.

== Revenue villages ==
The following are the revenue villages under Bahour Firka

- Bahour
- Irulanchandai
- Kadavanur
- Karayambuthur
- Kuruvinatham
- Manamedu
- Panayadikuppam
- Parikalpet

== See also ==
- Netapakkam firka
- Selliamedu firka
