= Krishnavaram, Puducherry =

Krishnavaram Mathi Krishnapuram
- Village
- Location in Puducherry, India Krishnavaram (India)
- Coordinates: 11.791849°N 79.771857°E
- Country: India
- State: Puducherry
- District: Pondicherry
- Taluk: Bahour
- Commune: Bahour

Languages
  - Official: French, Tamil, English
- Time zone: UTC+5:30 (IST)
- PIN: 607 402
- Telephone code: 0413
- Vehicle registration: PY-01
- Sex ratio: 50% ♂/♀

Krishnavaram is a village in Bahour Commune of Bahour taluk in the Union Territory of Puducherry, India. This is the last village of Puducherry district to lie on NH-45A between Puducherry-Cuddalore. In other words, Krishnavaram is the gateway to Puducherry from Cuddalore. There exists an Arch at this village which is mentioned as Mullodai Arch as it lies near Mullodai (Mull Odai). Krishnavaram is also known by the name Mathi Krishnapuram. An ancient Vishnu temple in dilapidated condition exists in this village which needs immediate attention from the devotees.

== Geography ==
Krishnavaram is bordered by Bahour in the west, Manappattu in the north, Pudukuppam in east and Kanganakuppam village of Tamil Nadu in the south.

== Villages ==
Following are the list of villages under Krishnavaram Village Panchayat.

- Krishnavaram
- Koravallimedu
- Sulliyankuppam
- Utchimedu

== Road Network ==
Krishnavaram is connected by Pudukuppam-Soriyankuppam road which runs via Moorthikuppam, Koravallimedu, Krishnavaram, Kuruvinatham.

== Gallery ==
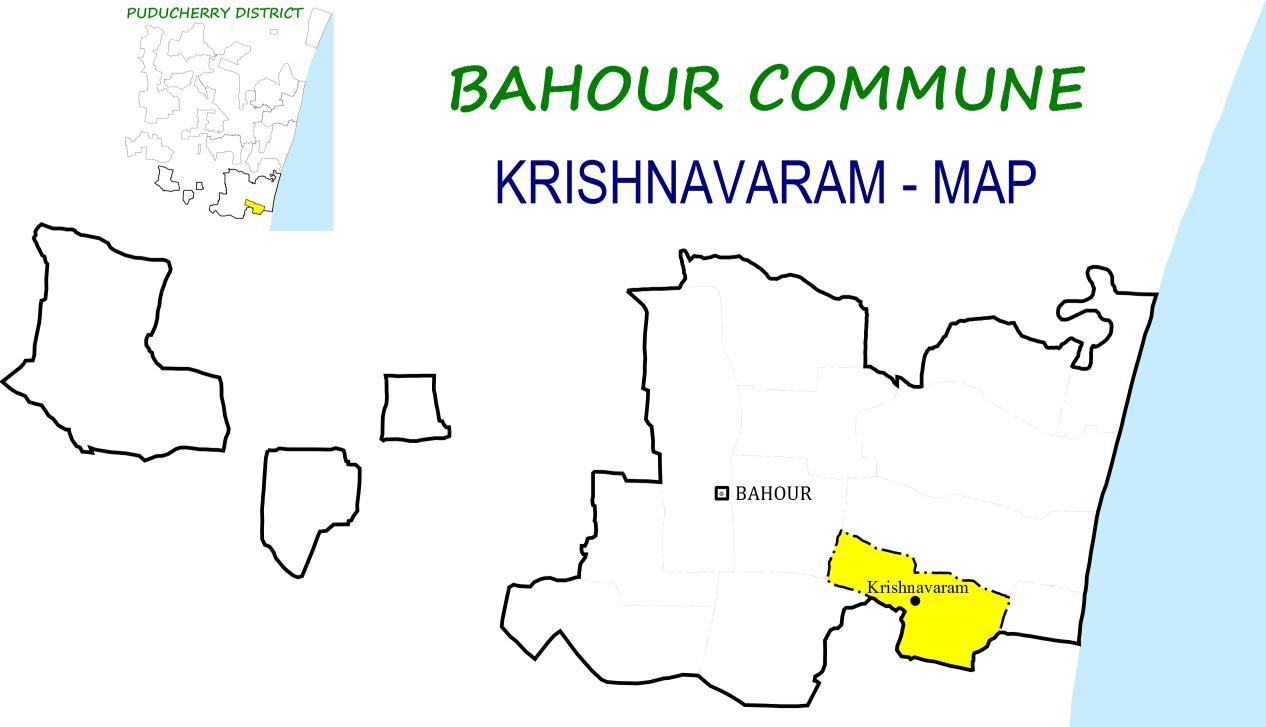
Map of Krishnavaram Village Panchayat

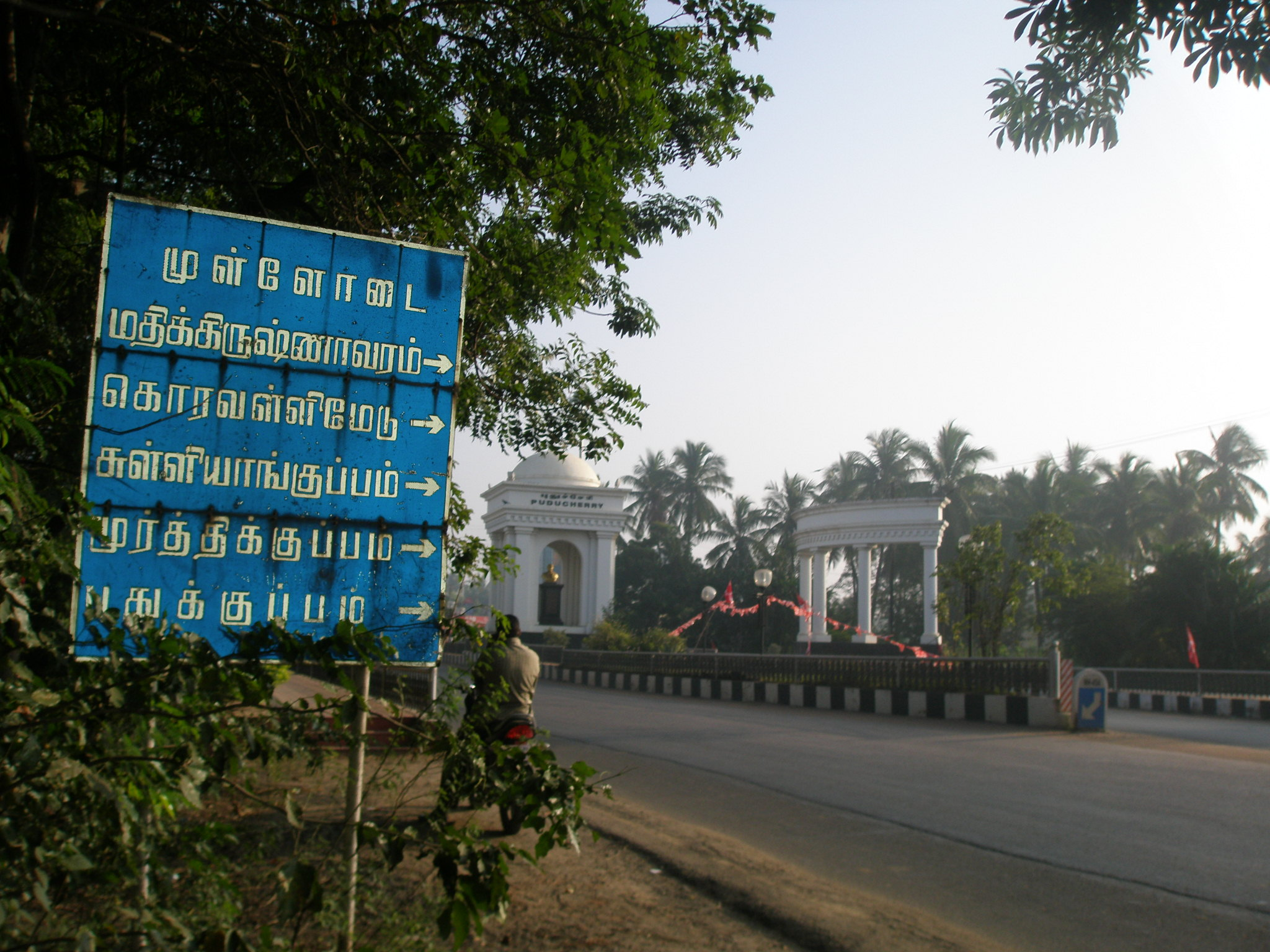
Way to Mathikrishnapuram at Puducherry Arch, Mullodai

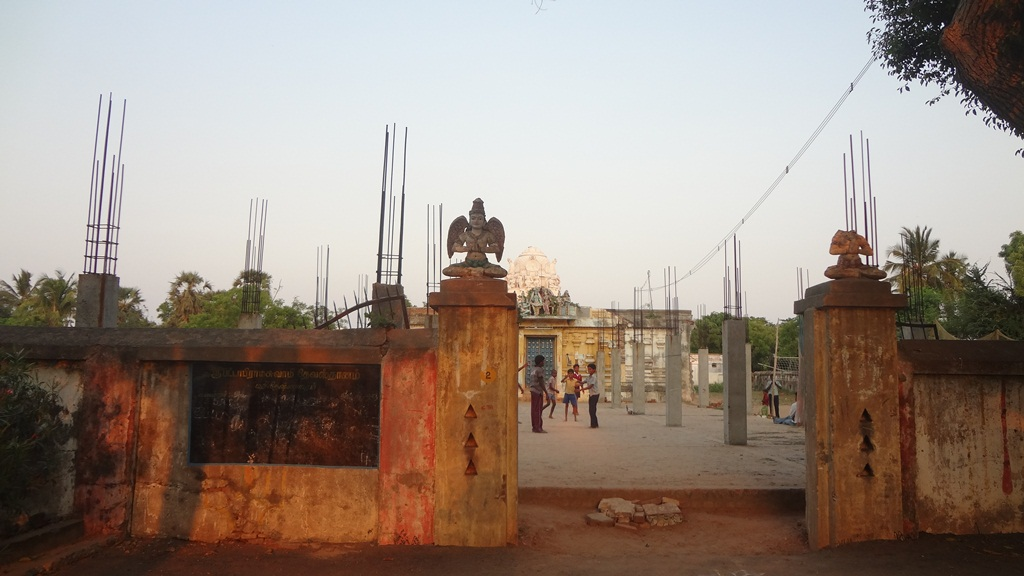
Vishnu Temple, Mathikrishnapuram, Bahour Commune

== Politics ==
Krishnavaram is a part of Bahour (Union Territory Assembly constituency) which comes under Puducherry (Lok Sabha constituency)
