= Chinna Karaiyamputhur =

Chinna Karayambuthur
- Village
- Location in Puducherry, India Chinna Karayambuthur (India)
- Coordinates: 11.816592°N 79.669354°E
- Country: India
- State: Puducherry
- District: Pondicherry
- Taluk: Bahour
- Commune: Bahour

Languages
  - Official: Telugu, Tamil, English
- Time zone: UTC+5:30 (IST)
- PIN: 605 106
- Telephone code: 0413
- Vehicle registration: PY-01
- Sex ratio: 50% ♂/♀

Chinna Karayambuthur is a village in Bahour Commune of Bahour taluk in the Union Territory of Puducherry, India. It lies on the eastern part of Karaiyamputhur Enclave of Puducherry. Chinna Karaiyamputhur serves as a link between Karaiyamputhur and Manamedu Enclave. Chinna Karaiyamputhur is a part of Karaiyamputhur Village Panchayat.

== Gallery ==
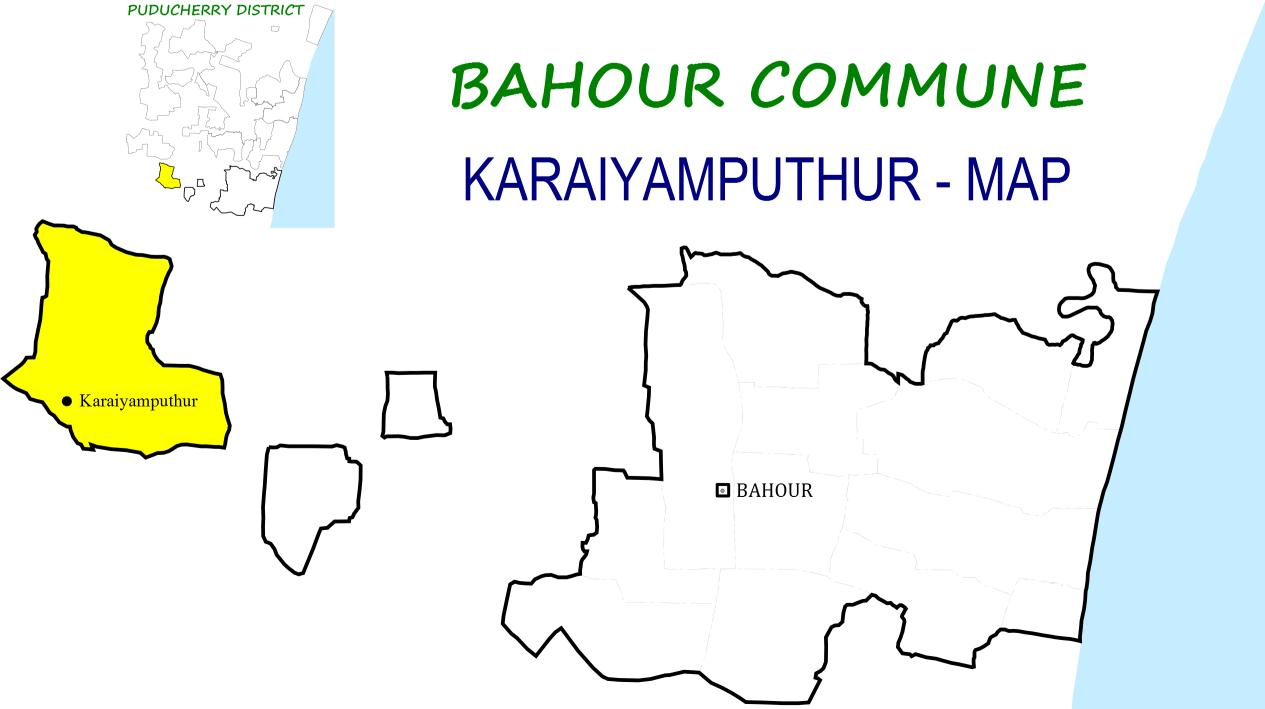
Map of Karaiyamputhur Village Panchayat
