= Pillaiyarkuppam, Bahour =

Pillaiyarkuppam
- Village
- Location in Puducherry, India Pillaiyarkuppam (India)
- Coordinates: 11.811908°N 79.792199°E
- Country: India
- State: Puducherry
- District: Pondicherry
- Taluk: Bahour
- Commune: Bahour

Languages
  - Official: French, Tamil, English
- Time zone: UTC+5:30 (IST)
- PIN: 607 402
- Telephone code: 0413
- Vehicle registration: PY-01
- Sex ratio: 50% ♂/♀

Pillaiyarkuppam is a village in Bahour Commune of Bahour taluk in the Union Territory of Puducherry, India. It lies 2 km east of NH-45A.

== Geography ==
Pillaiyarkuppam is bordered by Kudiyiruppupalayam in the west, Kirumampakkam in the north, Bay of Bengal in east and Manappattu in the south.

== Road network ==
Pillaiyarkuppam is connected to Puducherry by Narambai road which branches off at the 51st km. of NH-45A. Also Pannithittu-Pudukuppam road passes through Pillaiyarkuppam.

== Villages ==
Following are the list of villages under Pillaiyarkuppam Village Panchayat.

- Pillaiyarkuppam
- Kandanpet
- Narambai
- Valluvarmedu

== Gallery ==
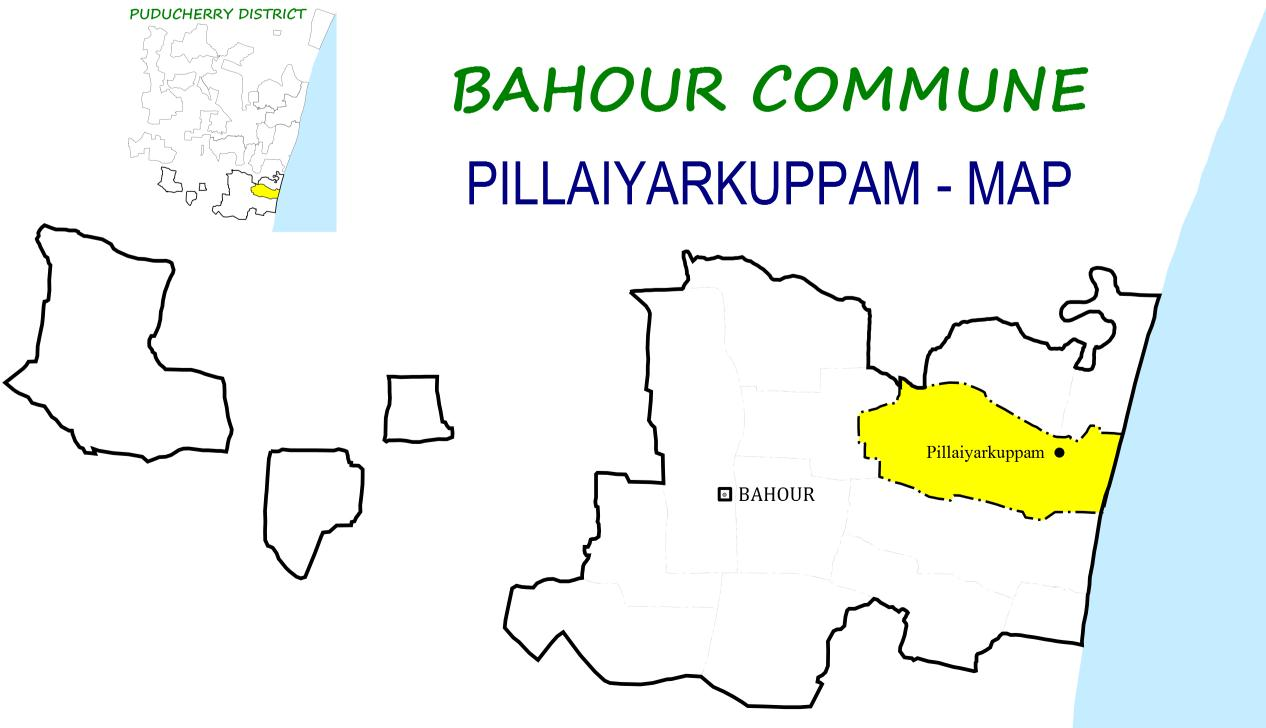
Map of Pillaiyarkuppam Village Panchayat

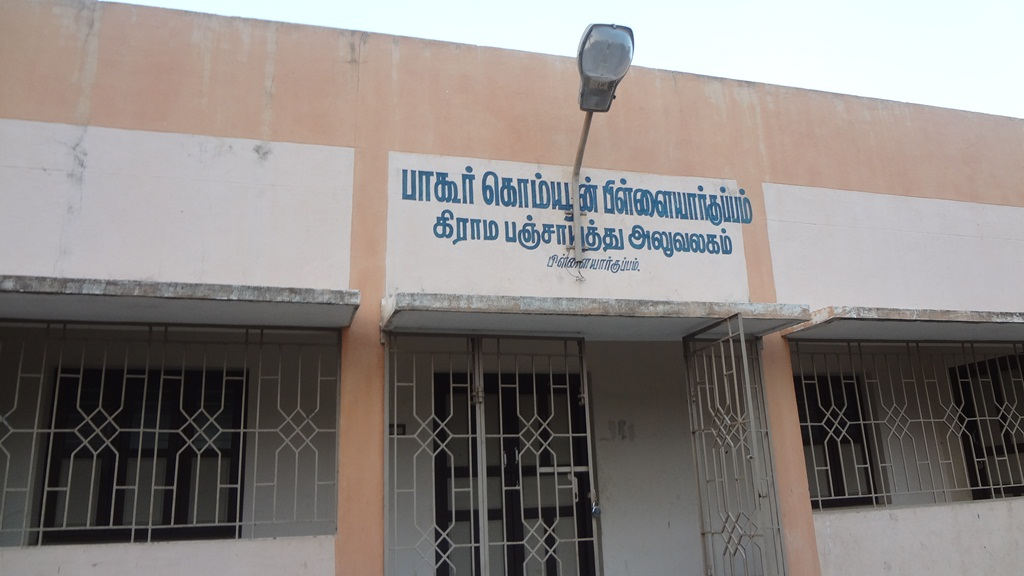
Pillayarkuppam Village Panchayat Office, Bahour Commune

== Resort ==
=== Zest Big Beach, Puducherry ===
Zest Big Beach, a Mahindra group company, is located at Pillaiyarkuppam beach. It provides variety of adventurous activities.

== Politics ==
Pillaiyarkuppam is a part of Embalam (Union Territory Assembly constituency) which comes under Puducherry (Lok Sabha constituency).
