= Aranganur =

- Village
- Location in Puducherry, India Aranganur (India)
- Coordinates: 11.831566°N 79.749155°E
- Country: India
- State: Puducherry
- District: Pondicherry
- Taluk: Bahour
- Commune: Bahour

Population (2001)
  - Total: 36,983

Languages
  - Official: French, Tamil, English
- Time zone: UTC+5:30 (IST)
- PIN: 607 402
- Telephone code: 0413
- Vehicle registration: PY-01
- Sex ratio: 50% ♂/♀

Aranganur is a village in the Bahour Commune of Bahour taluk in the Union Territory of Puducherry, India. It lies on the north side of the Bahour enclave of Puducherry district. Aranganur is a part of Seliamedu Village Panchayat.

== Geography ==
Seliamedu is bordered by Bahour in the west, Keezh Kumaramangalam village of Tamil Nadu in the north, Nagappanur village of Tamil Nadu in east and Kudiyiruppupalayam in the south.

== Road Network ==
Aranganur lies on the Villianur - Bahour road (RC-18).

== Gallery ==
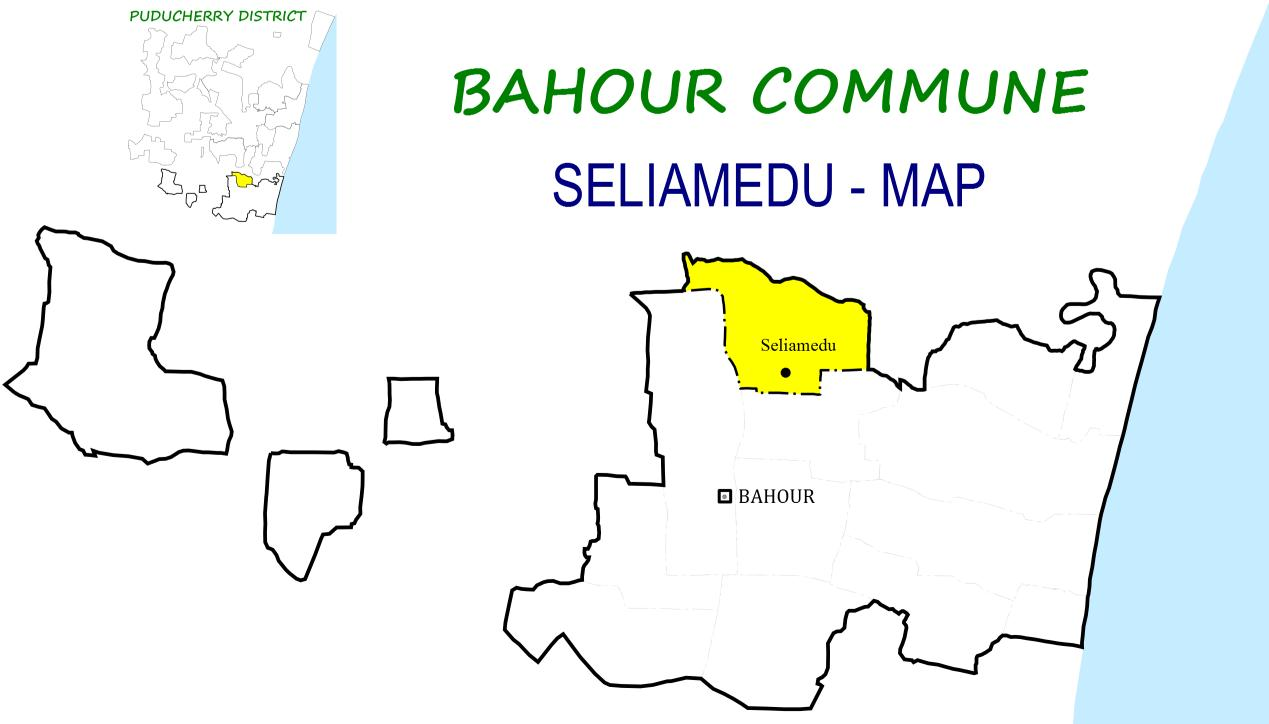
Map of Seliamedu Village Panchayat

== Politics ==
Aranganur is a part of the Embalam (Union Territory Assembly constituency) which comes under the Puducherry (Lok Sabha constituency)
