= Seliamedu =

- Village
- Location in Puducherry, India Seliamedu (India)
- Coordinates: 11.82493°N 79.753232°E
- Country: India
- State: Puducherry
- District: Pondicherry
- Taluk: Bahour
- Commune: Bahour

Population (2001)
  - Total: 36,983

Languages
  - Official: French, Tamil, English
- Time zone: UTC+5:30 (IST)
- PIN: 607 402
- Telephone code: 0413
- Vehicle registration: PY-01
- Sex ratio: 50% ♂/♀

Seliamedu is a village, sub-taluk in Bahour Commune of Bahour taluk in the Union Territory of Puducherry, India. It lies on north side in the Bahour Enclave of Puducherry district.

== Geography ==
Seliamedu is bordered by Bahour in the west, Keezh Kumaramangalam village of Tamil Nadu in the north, Nagappanur village of Tamil Nadu in east and Kudiyiruppupalayam in the south.

== Road Network ==
Seliamedu lies on Villianur - Bahour road (RC-18). Seliamedu is also connected by TN Palayam-Bahour road.

== Villages ==
Following are the list of villages under Seliamedu Village Panchayat.

- Seliamedu
- Aranganur

== Gallery ==
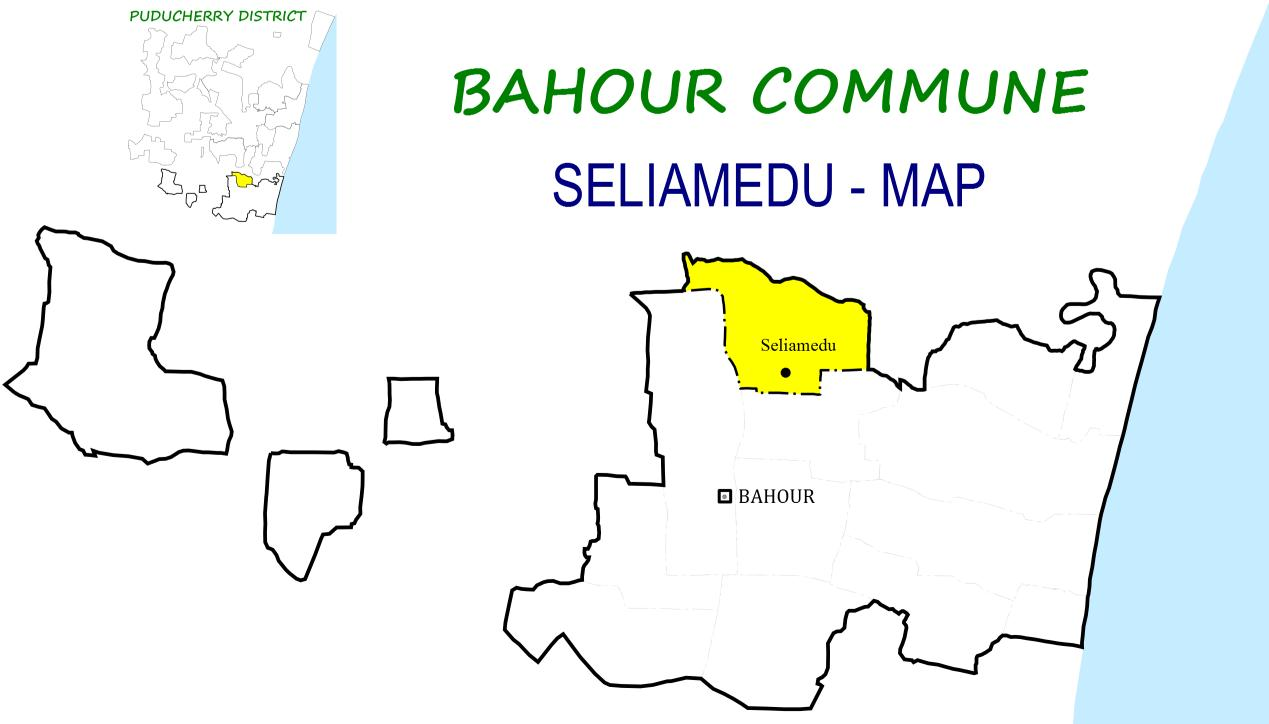
Map of Seliamedu Village Panchayat

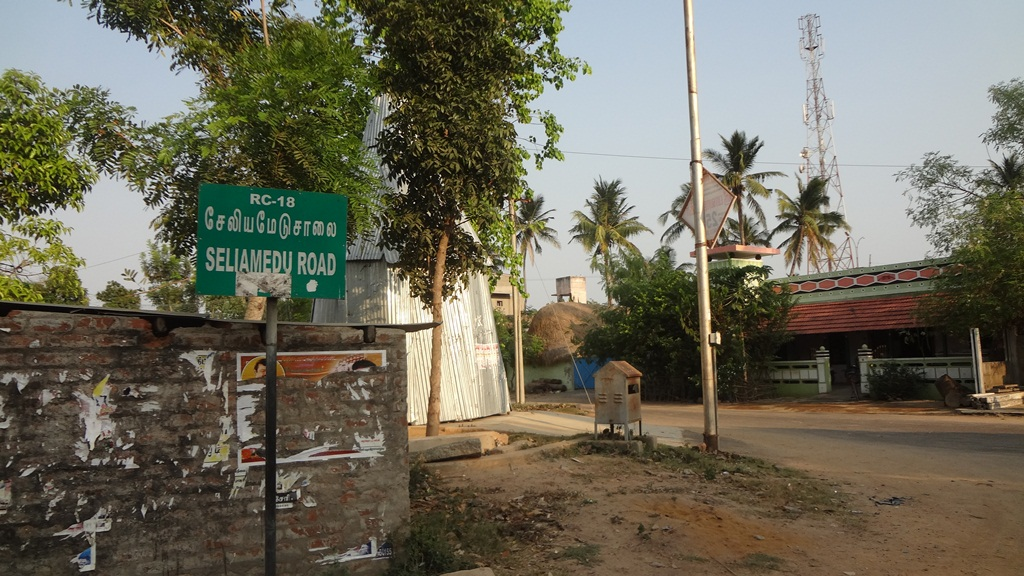
Seliamedu, Bahour Commune

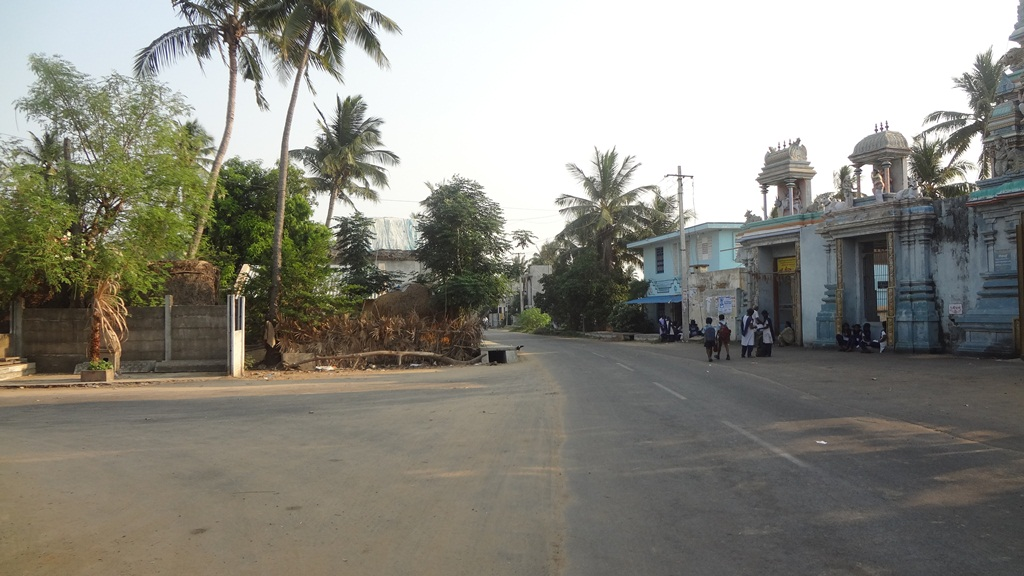
Siva Temple, Seliamedu, Bahour Commune

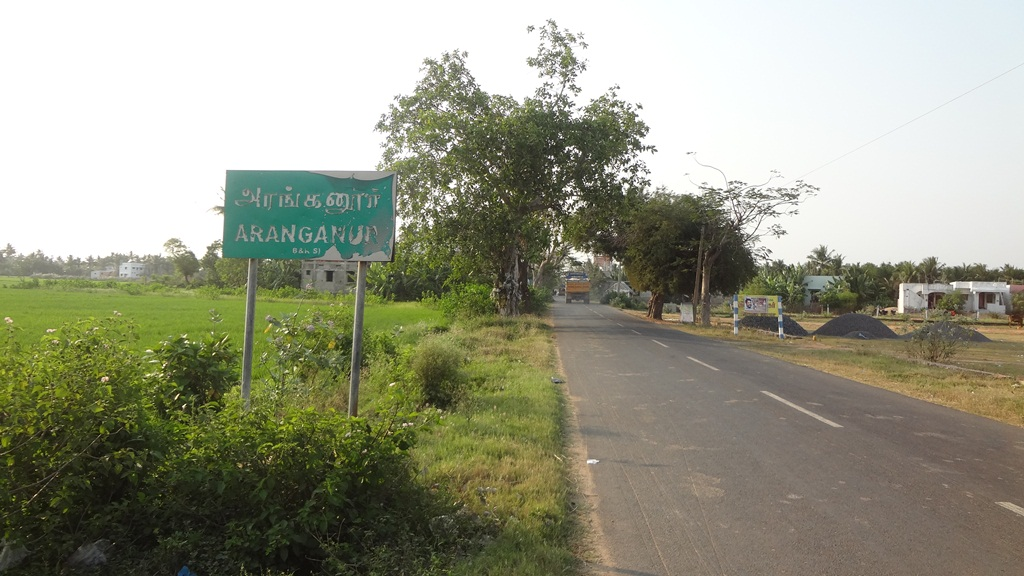
Aranganur, Seliamedu, Bahour Commune

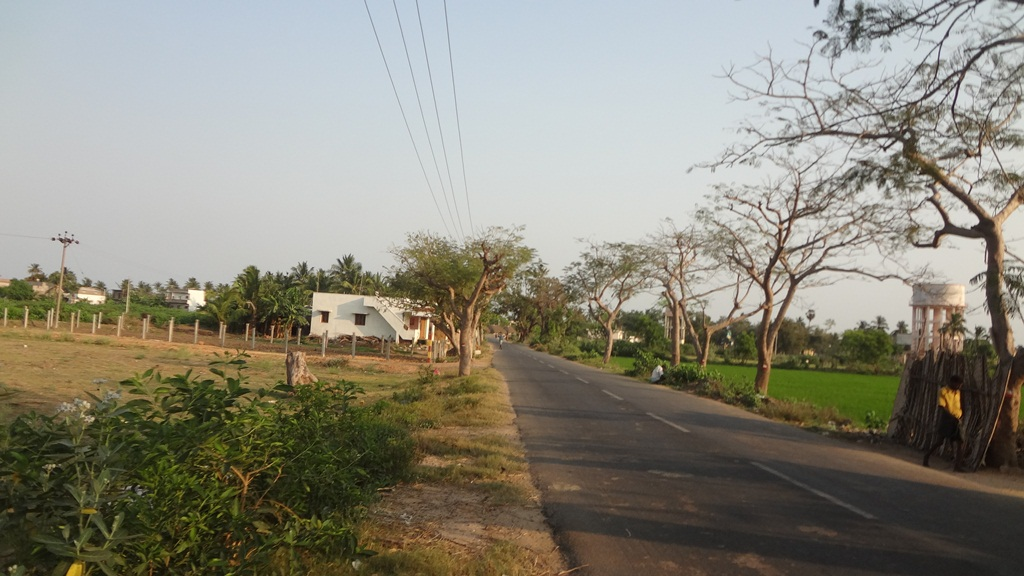
RC-18 Road at Aranganur, Seliamedu, Bahour Commune

== Politics ==
Seliamedu is a part of Embalam (Union Territory Assembly constituency) which comes under Puducherry (Lok Sabha constituency)
