= Selliamedu firka =

Coordinates: 11°49′31.71″N 79°45′15.81″E

Selliamedu is one of the 3 Firkas of Bahour taluk in Pondicherry (North) Revenue Sub-division of the Indian union territory of Puducherry.

== Revenue villages ==
The following are the revenue villages under Selliamedu Firka

- Aranganoor
- Kirumampakkam
- Manapet
- Pillayarkuppam
- Selliamedu
- Utchimedu

== See also ==
- Bahour firka
- Netapakkam firka
