= Karaiyamputhur =

- Village
- Location in Puducherry, India Karaiyamputhur (India)
- Coordinates: 11.819437°N 79.649794°E
- Country: India
- State: Puducherry
- District: Pondicherry
- Taluk: Bahour
- Commune: Bahour

Population (2001)
  - Total: 36,983

Languages
  - Official: French, Tamil, English
- Time zone: UTC+5:30 (IST)
- PIN: 605 106
- Telephone code: 0413
- Vehicle registration: PY-01
- Sex ratio: 50% ♂/♀

Karaiyamputhur is a village in Bahour Commune of Bahour taluk in the Union Territory of Puducherry, India. It is one of the 11 Enclaves of Puducherry. Karaiyamputhur serves as a gateway to Puducherry - Panruti route. It lies on the southwesternmost tip of Puducherry district.

== Toponymy ==
The name Karaiyamputhur means new settlement on the banks of a river. Here the karai (banks) refers to Pennaiyar River banks. Pennaiyatrukaraiputhur may be the name which gets shortened to Karaiyamputhur.The original name may be Karaiyanputrur.

== Geography ==
Karaiyamputhur is surrounded by villages of Tamil Nadu on all side. It is connected to Bahour, its Commune Headquarters by Frontier Road (RC-21).

== Villages ==
Karaiyamputhur village panchayat consist of

- Karaiyamputhur
- Chinna Karaiyamputhur
- Panayadikuppam

== Gallery ==
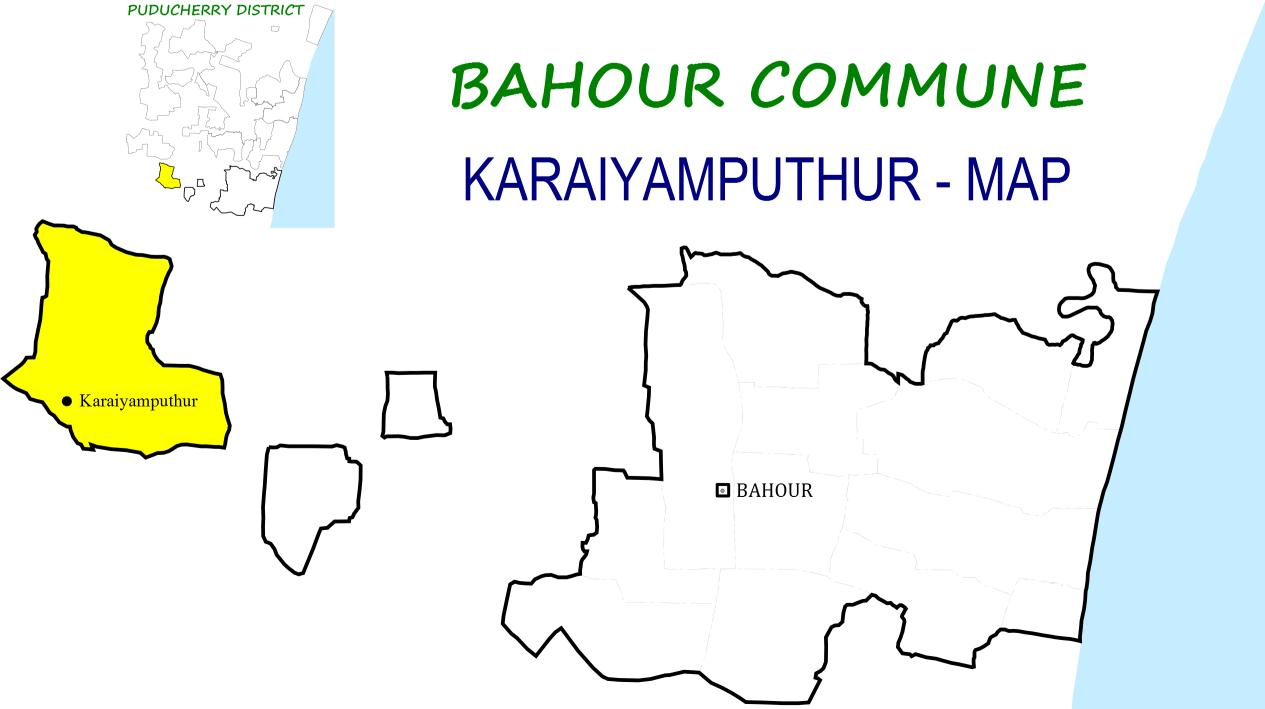
Map of Karaiyamputhur Village Panchayat

== Politics ==
Karaiyamputhur is a part of Nettapakkam (Union Territory Assembly constituency) which comes under Puducherry (Lok Sabha constituency)
