= Kaduvanur =

- Village
- Location in Puducherry, India Kaduvanur (India)
- Coordinates: 11.816297°N 79.696927°E
- Country: India
- State: Puducherry
- District: Pondicherry
- Taluk: Bahour
- Commune: Bahour

Languages
  - Official: French, Tamil, English
- Time zone: UTC+5:30 (IST)
- PIN: 607 402
- Telephone code: 0413
- Vehicle registration: PY-01
- Sex ratio: 50% ♂/♀

Kaduvanur is a village in Bahour Commune of Bahour taluk in the Union Territory of Puducherry, India. It is one of the 11 Enclaves of Puducherry district. Kaduvanur is a part of Manamedu Village no tea shop no hotel

== Gallery ==
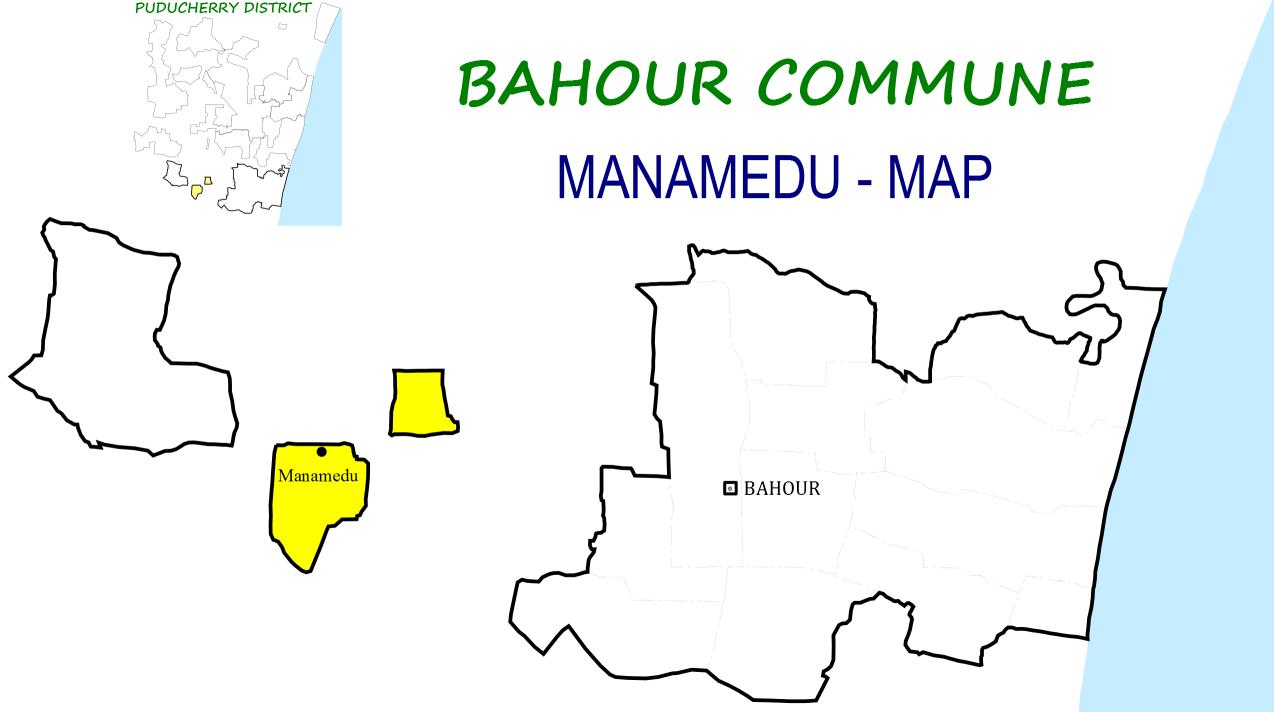
Map of Manamedu Village Panchayat

== Politics ==
Kaduvanur is a part of Bahour (Union Territory Assembly constituency) which comes under Puducherry (Lok Sabha constituency).
