= Parikkalpattu =

- Village
- Location in Puducherry, India Parikkalpattu (India)
- Coordinates: 11.792815°N 79.751623°E
- Country: India
- State: Puducherry
- District: Pondicherry
- Taluk: Bahour
- Commune: Bahour

Population (2001)
  - Total: 36,983

Languages
  - Official: French, Tamil, English
- Time zone: UTC+5:30 (IST)
- PIN: 607 402
- Telephone code: 0413
- Vehicle registration: PY-01
- Sex ratio: 50% ♂/♀

Parikkalpattu is a village in Bahour Commune of Bahour taluk in the Union Territory of Puducherry, India. It lies on southern border of Bahour Enclave of Puducherry district.

== Geography ==
Parikkalpattu is bordered by Kuruvinatham, Soriyankuppam in the west, Bahour in the north, Kanganakuppam village of Tamil Nadu in the east and Pennaiyar River in the south.

== Road Network ==
Parikkalpattu is connected to Bahour, its Commune Headquarters via Bahour-Parikkalpattu road. PRTC ply town bus to Parikkalpattu. But they are less frequent.

== Villages ==
Following are the list of villages under Parikkalpattu Village Panchayat.

- Mel Parikkalpattu
- Keezh Parikkalpattu
- Periya Archatchikuppam
- Chinna Archatchikuppam
- Kumandhanmedu

== Gallery ==
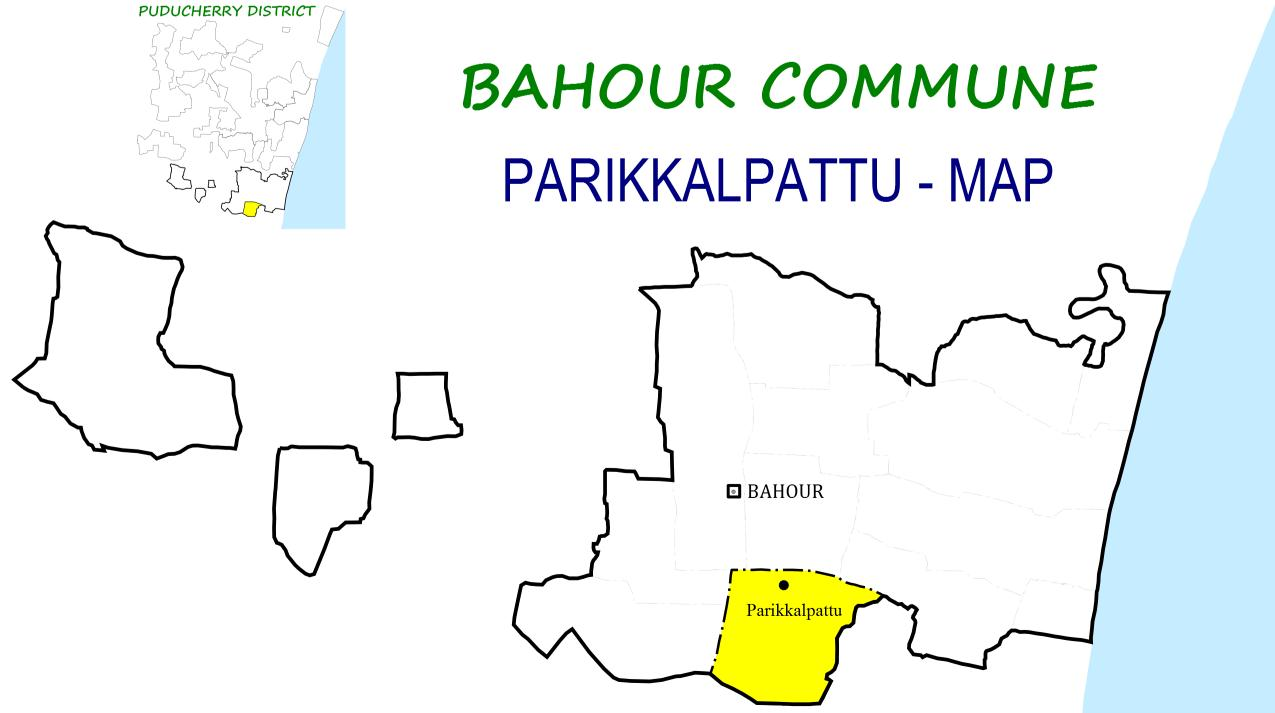
Map of Parikkalpattu Village Panchayat

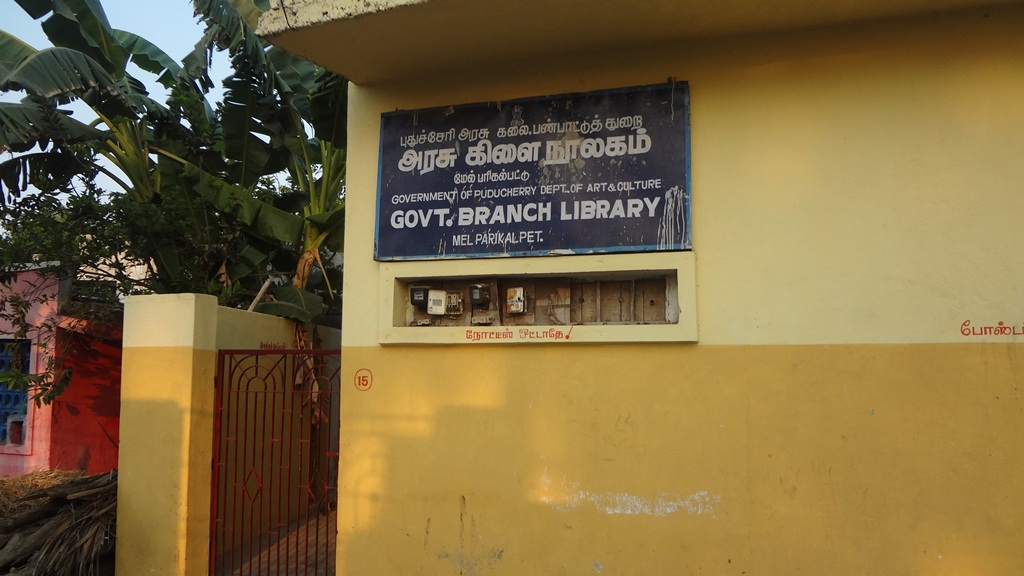
Government Branch Library, Parikkalpattu Bahour Commune

== Politics ==
Parikkalpattu is a part of Bahour (Union Territory Assembly constituency) which comes under Puducherry (Lok Sabha constituency)
