= Panayadikuppam =

Panayadikuppam Panaiyadikuppam or Panaiyadikkuppamis
- Village
- Location in Puducherry, India Panayadikuppam (India)
- Coordinates: 11.843453°N 79.651769°E
- Country: India
- State: Puducherry
- District: Pondicherry
- Taluk: Bahour
- Commune: Bahour

Population (2001)
  - Total: 36,983

Languages
  - Official: French, Tamil, English
- Time zone: UTC+5:30 (IST)
- PIN: 605 106
- Telephone code: 0413
- Vehicle registration: PY-01
- Sex ratio: 50% ♂/♀

Panayadikuppam, otherwise known as Panaiyadikuppam or Panaiyadikkuppamis, is a village in Bahour Commune of Bahour taluk in the Union Territory of Puducherry, India. It lies in the northern part of Karaiyamputhur Enclave of Puducherry. Panayadikuppam serves as a gateway to Nettapakkam from Bahour. Panayadikuppam is a part of the Karaiyamputhur Village Panchayat.

== Gallery ==
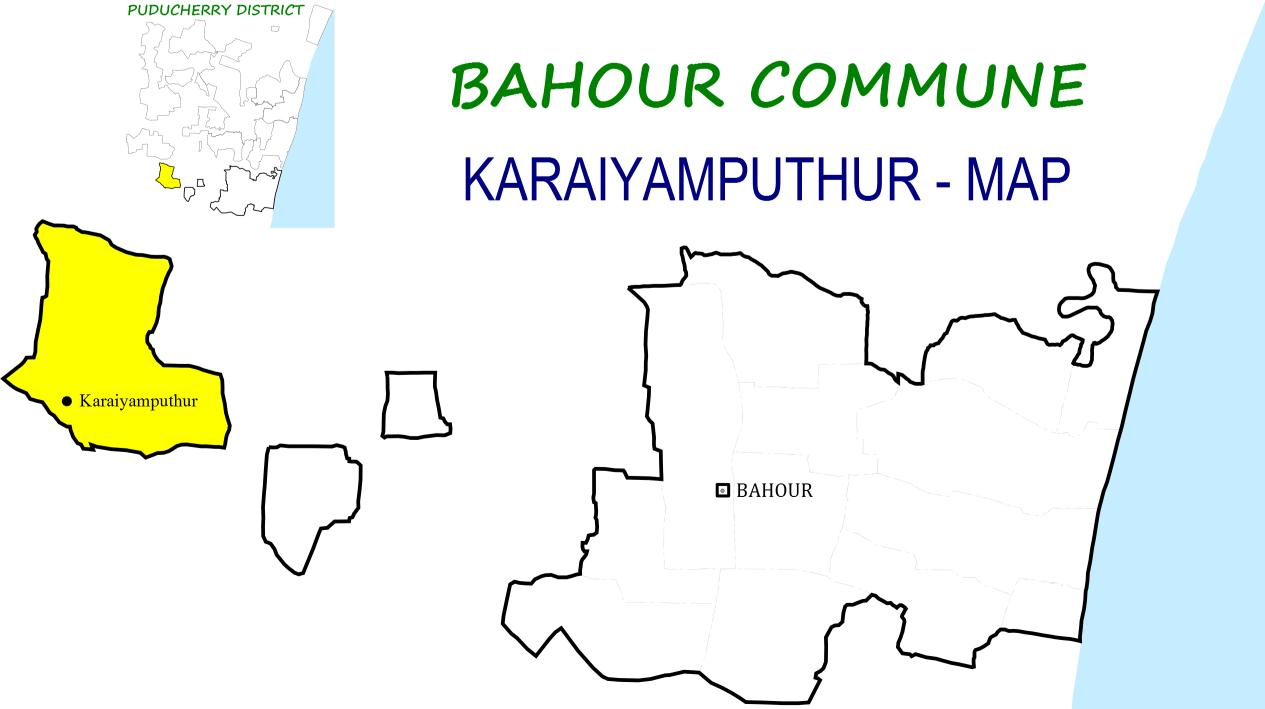
Map of Karaiyamputhur Village Panchayat
