= Kudiyiruppupalayam =

- Village
- Location in Puducherry, India Kudiyiruppupalayam (India)
- Coordinates: 11.820435°N 79.75158°E
- Country: India
- State: Puducherry
- District: Pondicherry
- Taluk: Bahour
- Commune: Bahour

Languages
  - Official: French, Tamil, English
- Time zone: UTC+5:30 (IST)
- PIN: 607 402
- Telephone code: 0413
- Vehicle registration: PY-01
- Sex ratio: 50% ♂/♀

Kudiyiruppupalayam is a village in Bahour Commune of Bahour taluk in the Union Territory of Puducherry, India. It lies on north side in the Bahour Enclave of Puducherry district.

== Geography ==
Kudiyiruppupalayam is bordered by Bahour in the west, Seliamedu in the north, Pillaiyarkuppam in east and Bahour in the south.

== Road Network ==
Kudiyiruppupalayam lies on Villianur - Bahour road (RC-18) between Seliamedu and Bahour. Kirumampakkam-Bahour road (RC-27) meets RC18 at Kudiyiruppupalayam.

== Villages ==
Following are the list of villages under Kudiyiruppupalayam Village Panchayat.

- Kudiyiruppupalayam
- Adingapet
- Pinnatchikuppam

== Gallery ==
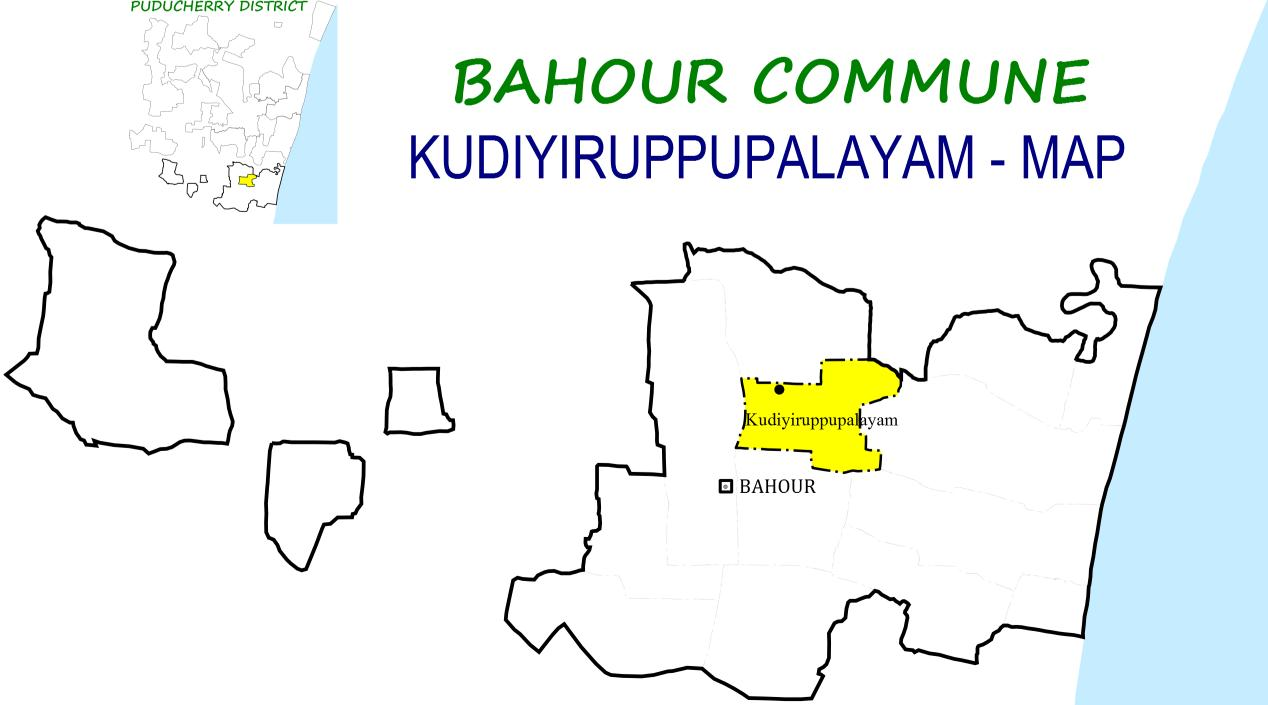
Map of Kudiyiruppupalayam Village Panchayat

== Politics ==
Kudiyiruppupalayam is a part of Embalam (Union Territory Assembly constituency) which comes under Puducherry (Lok Sabha constituency)
