= Pannithittu =

- Village
- Location in Puducherry, India Pannithittu (India)
- Coordinates: 11.828668°N 79.802295°E
- Country: India
- State: Puducherry
- District: Pondicherry
- Taluk: Bahour
- Commune: very village

Languages
  - Official: French, Tamil, English
- Time zone: UTC+5:30 (IST)
- PIN: 607 402
- Telephone code: 0413
- ISO 3166 code: IN-WB
- Vehicle registration: PY-01
- Sex ratio: 50% ♂/♀

Pannithittu is a village in Bahour Commune of Bahour taluk in the Union Territory of Puducherry, India. It lies east of NH-45A at a distance of 2 km from it. River Malattar joins Bay of Bengal at Pannithittu.

== Geography ==
Pannithittu is bordered by Kirumampakkam in the west, Malattar in the north, Bay of Bengal in east and Pillaiyarkuppam in the south.

== Villages ==
Following are the villages under Pannithittu Village Panchayat.

- Pannithittu
- Aladimedu
- Etchangadu
- Vambapet

== Road network ==
Pannithittu is connected to Puducherry by NH45A - Kirumampakkam road. Also Pannithittu is connected to Pudukuppam via. Pillaiyarkuppam, Bahour and Manappattu. There is also an access road from Reddichavadi via Pannithittu Regulator.

== Gallery ==
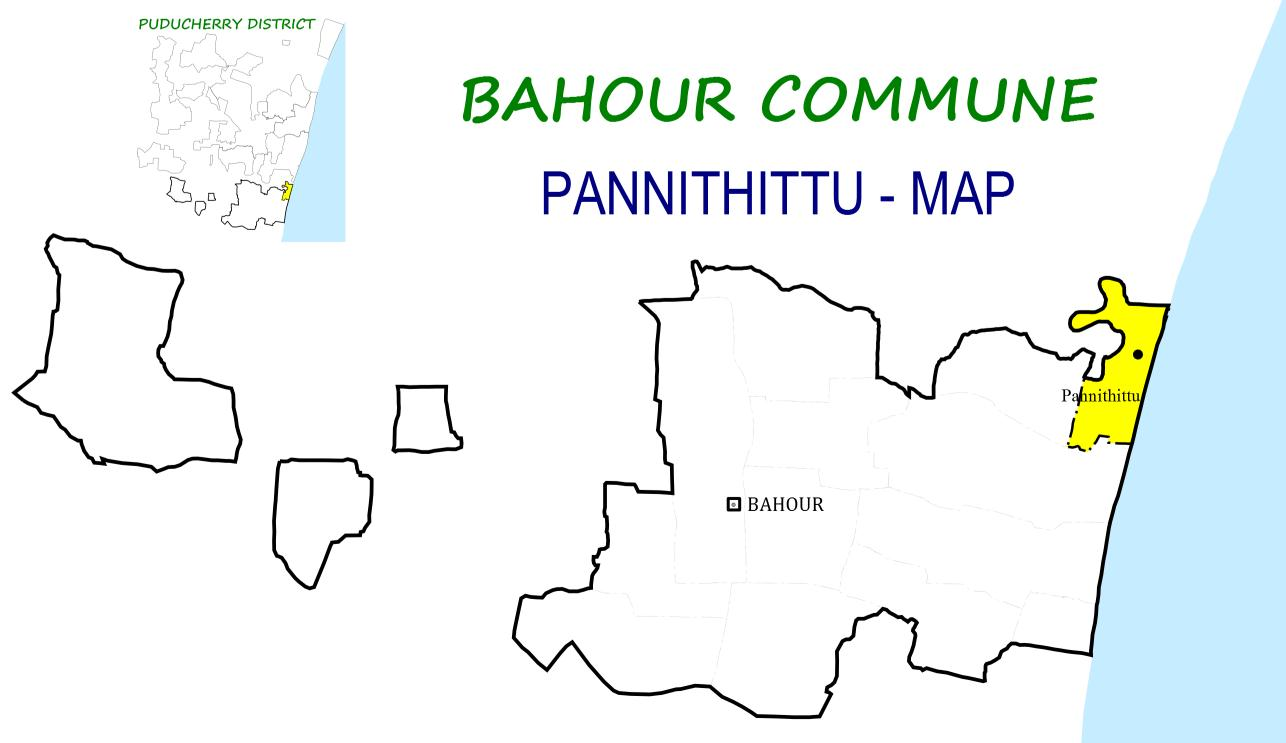
Map of Pannithittu Village Panchayat

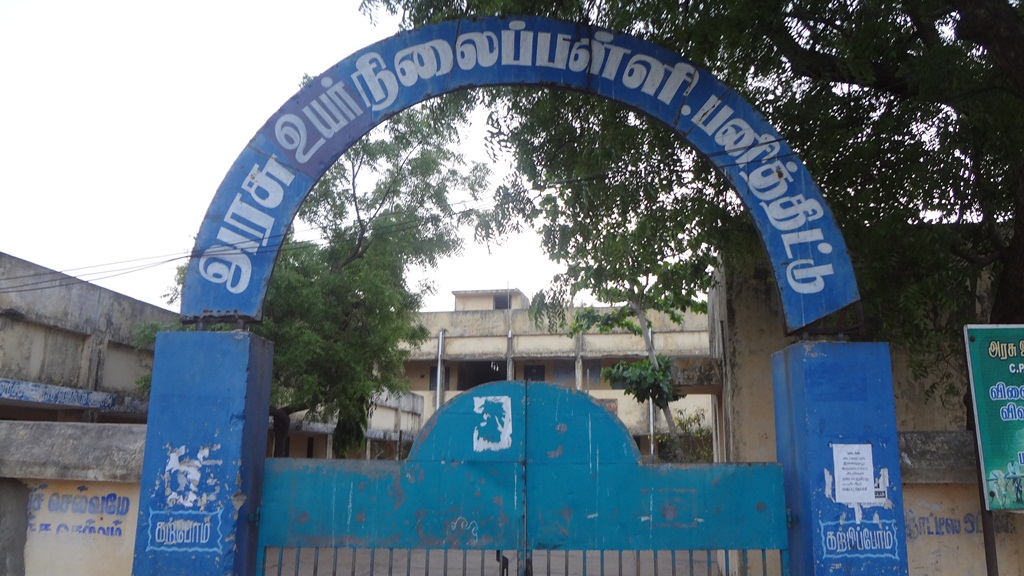
Government High School, Panniththittu, Bahour Commune

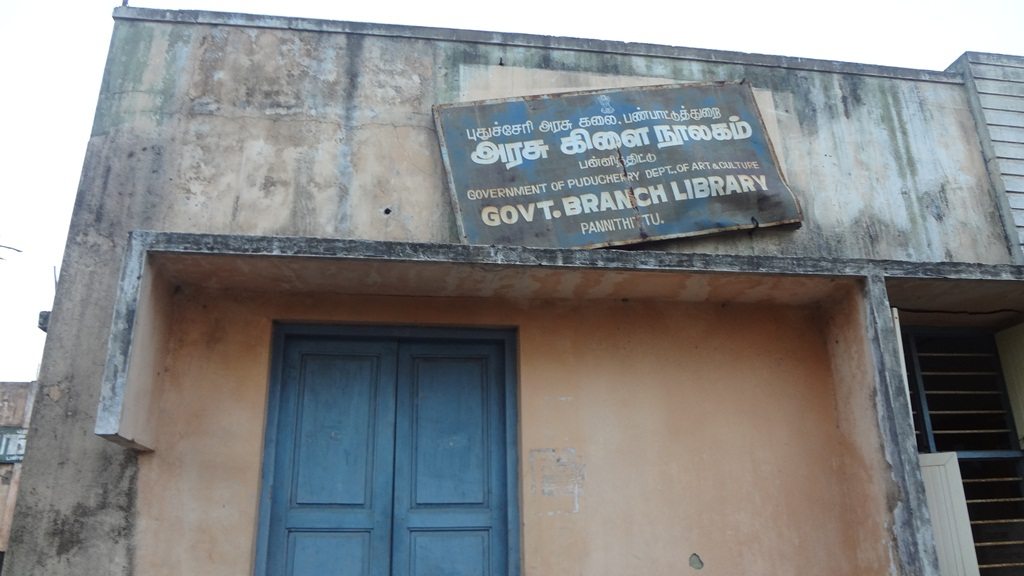
Government Branch Library, Panniththittu, Bahour Commune

== Politics ==
Pannithittu is a part of Embalam (Union Territory Assembly constituency) which comes under Puducherry (Lok Sabha constituency)
