= Bahour commune =

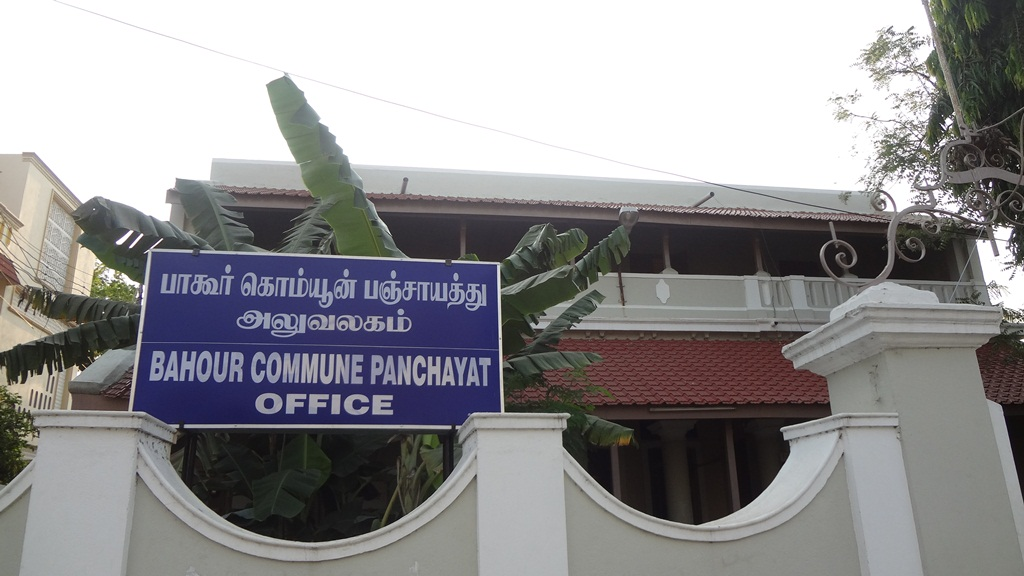
Bahour Commune Panchayat Office

Bahour is one of 5 Communes in Pondicherry district in the Indian territory of Puducherry. Bahour Commune comes under Bahour taluk of Puducherry district. Nettapakkam is another commune under Bahour taluk.

== Panchayat villages ==
The following are 15 panchayat villages under Bahour Commune, viz.

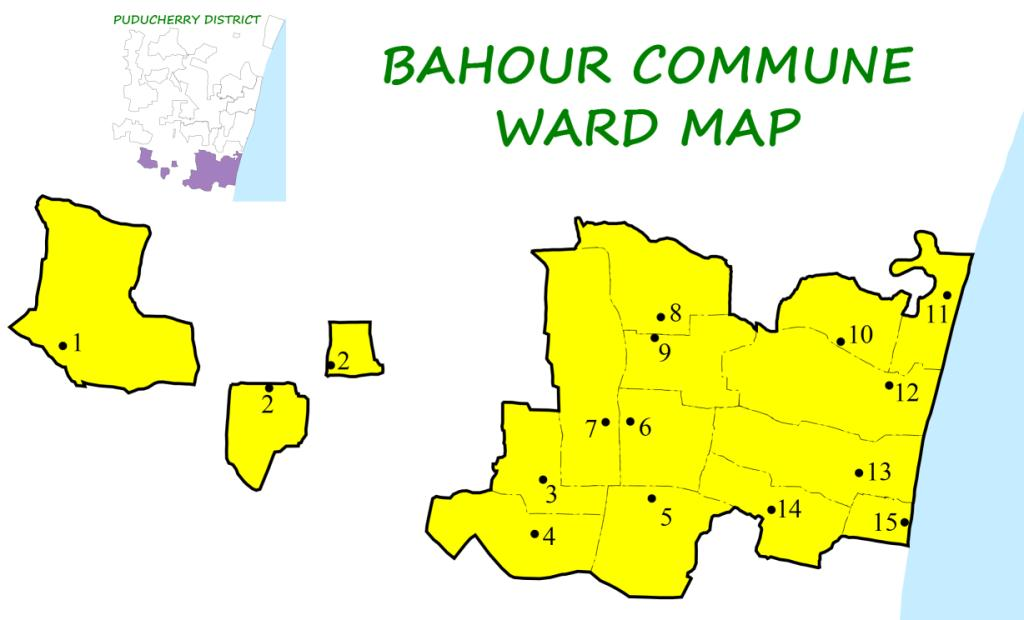

Ward Number	Ward Name	Area (km^{2})	Population (2011 Census)	Jurisdiction	Ward Map
1	Karaiyamputhur-Panayadikuppam			Karaiyamputhur, Chinna Karaiyamputhur, Panayadikuppam,	
2	Manamedu			Manamedu, Kaduvanur,	
3	Kuruvinatham			Kuruvinatham	
4	Soriankuppam			Soriankuppam	
5	Parikkalpattu			Mel Parikkalpattu; Keezh Parikkalpattu; Periya Archatchikuppam; Chinna Archatchikuppam; Kumandhanmedu	
6	Bahour (East)			Bahourpet; Kamaraj Nagar	
7	Bahour (West)			Bahour	
8	Seliamedu			Seliamedu; Aranganur	
9	Kudiyiruppupalayam			Kudiyiruppupalayam; Pinatchikuppam	
10	Kirumampakkam			Kirumampakkam	
11	Pannithittu			Pannithittu	
12	Pillaiyarkuppam			Pillaiyarkuppam; Narambai; Valluvarmedu	
13	Manapet			Manapet; Kanniakoil; Kattukuppam	
14	Krishnavaram			Krishnavaram; Koravallimedu; [Sulliyankuppam]; Utchimedu	
15	Pudukuppam			Moorthikuppam; Pudukuppam	
