= Manamedu =

- Village
- Location in Puducherry, India Manamedu (India)
- Coordinates: 11.812034°N 79.683902°E
- Country: India
- State: Puducherry
- District: Pondicherry
- Taluk: Bahour
- Commune: Bahour

Population (2001)
  - Total: 36,983

Languages
  - Official: French, Tamil, English
- Time zone: UTC+5:30 (IST)
- PIN: 607 402
- Telephone code: 0413
- Vehicle registration: PY-01
- Sex ratio: 50% ♂/♀

Manamedu is a village in Bahour Commune of Bahour taluk in the Union Territory of Puducherry, India. It is one of the 11 Enclaves of Puducherry. Manmedu serves as a gateway to Pondicherry - Nellikuppam route. It lies on the banks of Pennaiyar River

== History ==
The name Manamedu means "high area on the banks of a river". Manalmedu is being called as Manamedu.

== Geography ==
Manamedu is connected to Bahour, its Commune Headquarters by Frontier Road (RC-21). A bridge is being constructed across Pennaiyar River at Manamedu. Upon its completion, Manamedu will serve has a vital point on the Pondicherry–Nellikuppam route.

== Villages ==
Manamedu village panchayat consist of

- Manamedu
- Kaduvanur

== Politics ==
Manamedu is a part of Nettapakkam (Union Territory Assembly constituency) which comes under Puducherry (Lok Sabha constituency)

== Gallery ==
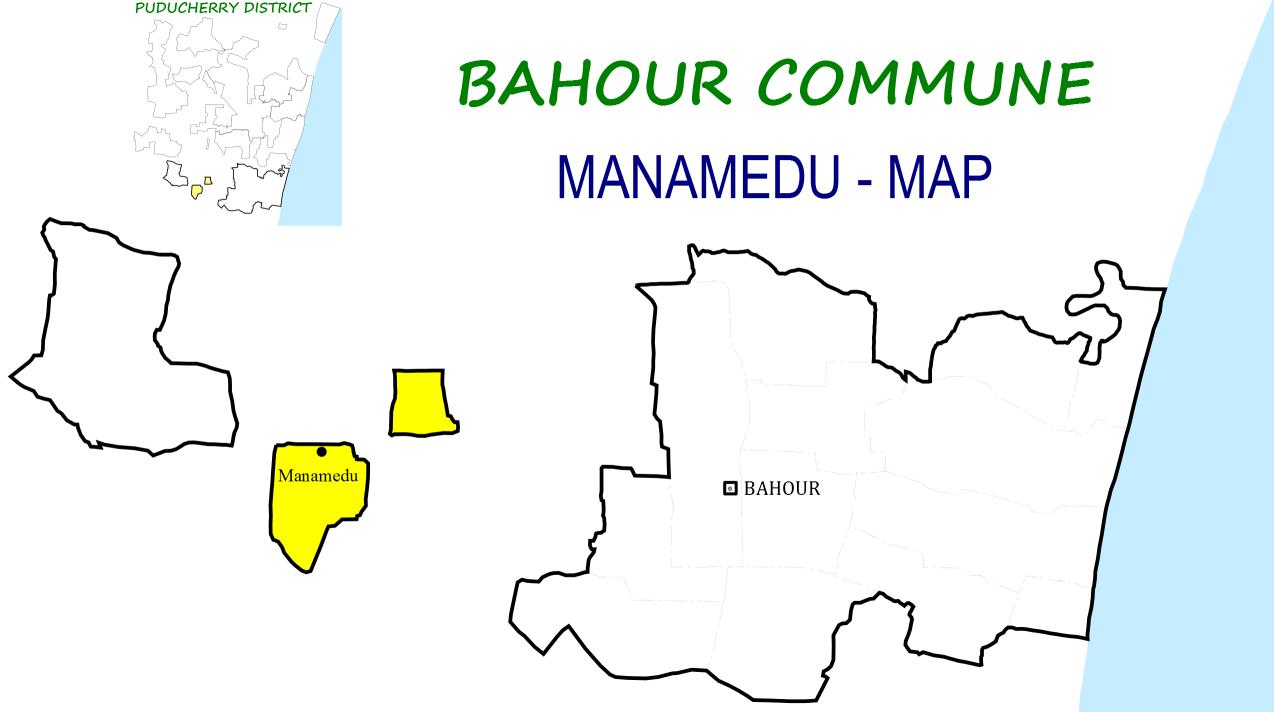
Map of Manamedu Village Panchayat

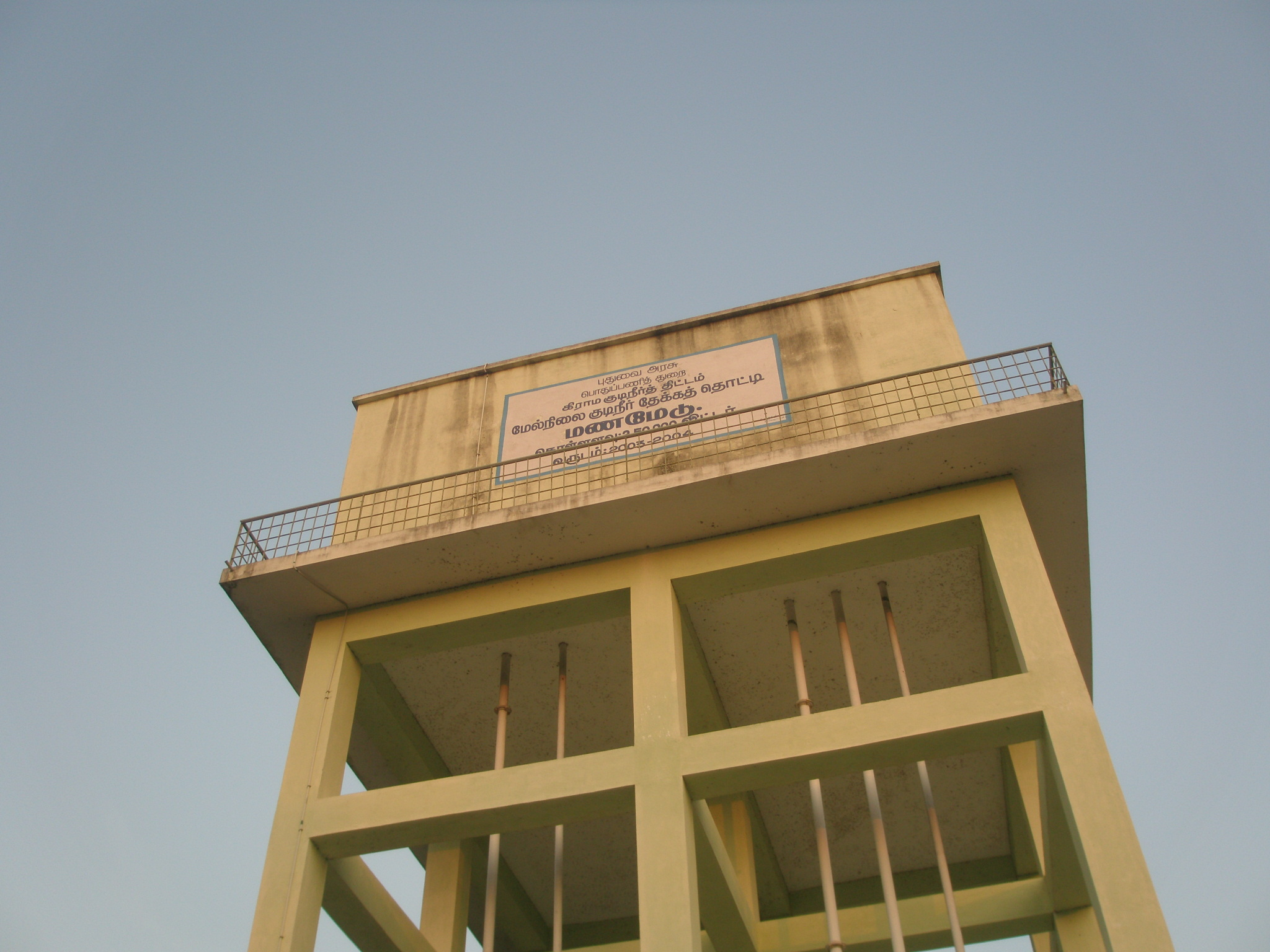
Overhead Water Tank, Manamedu, Bahour Commune
