= Kuruvinatham =

Kuruvinatham Courivinatham
- Village
- Location in Puducherry, India Kuruvinatham (India)
- Coordinates: 11.796512°N 79.732761°E
- Country: India
- State: Puducherry
- District: Pondicherry
- Taluk: Bahour
- Commune: Bahour

Population (2001)
  - Total: 36,983

Languages
  - Official: French, Tamil, English
- Time zone: UTC+5:30 (IST)
- PIN: 607 402
- Telephone code: 0413
- Vehicle registration: PY-01
- Sex ratio: 50% ♂/♀

Kuruvinatham is a village in Bahour Commune of Bahour taluk in the Union Territory of Puducherry, India. Kuruvinatham serves as a gateway for all buses going between Villupuram - Cuddalore via Thirubuvanai. It lies on the southwestern tip of Bahour Enclave of Puducherry district.

== Geography ==
Kuruvinatham is bordered by Thirupanampakkam village of Tamil Nadu in the west, Karaimedu village of Tamil Nadu in the north, Bahour and Parikkalpattu in the east and Soriyankuppam in the south.

== Road Network ==
Kuruvinatham is connected to Bahour, its Commune Headquarters, by RC-33 road. Cuddalore-Pallinelliyanur Major District Road (MDR) passes through Kuruvinatham. Buses plying between Puducherry and Soriyankuppam connects Kuruvinatham. Also Cuddalore-Villupuram bus plying via Bahour connects Kuruvinatham.

== Gallery ==
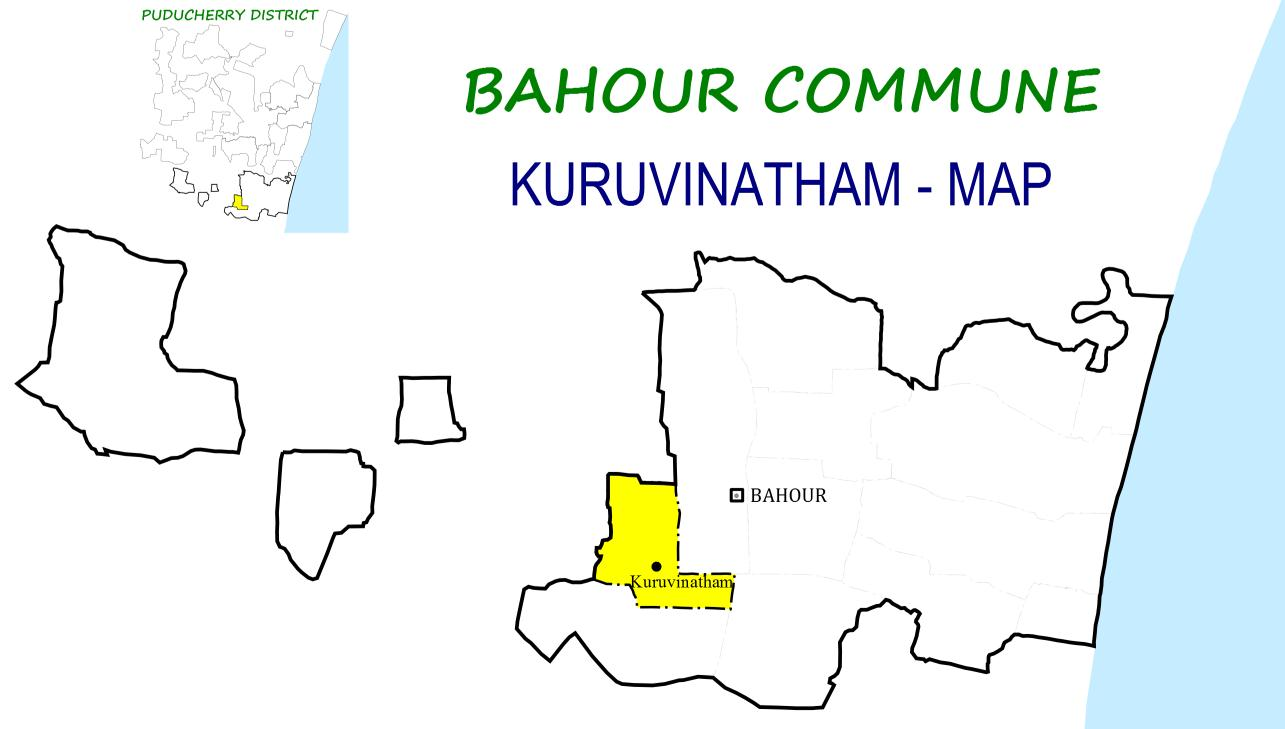
Map of Kuruvinatham Village Panchayat

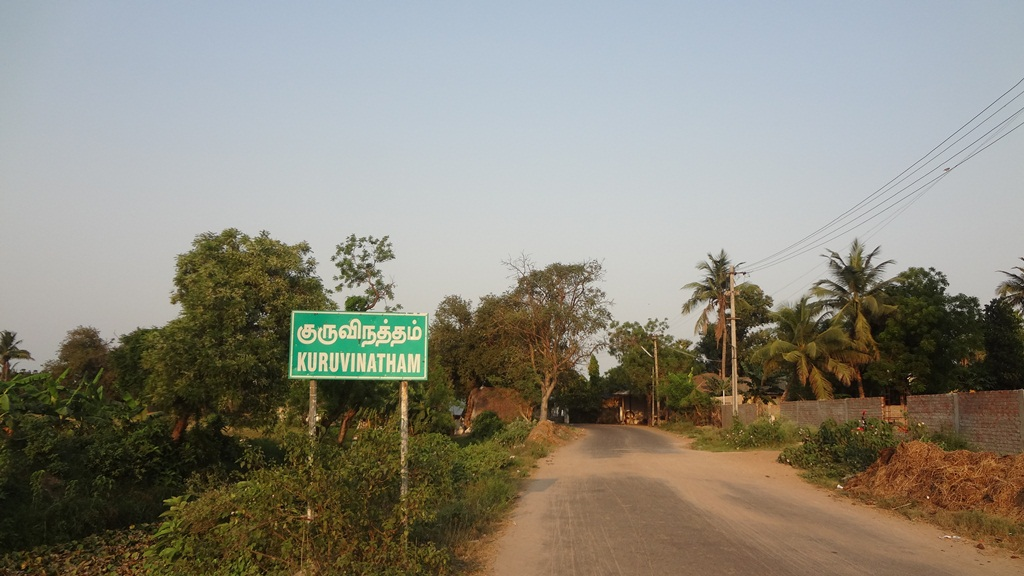
Kuruvinatham, Bahour Commune

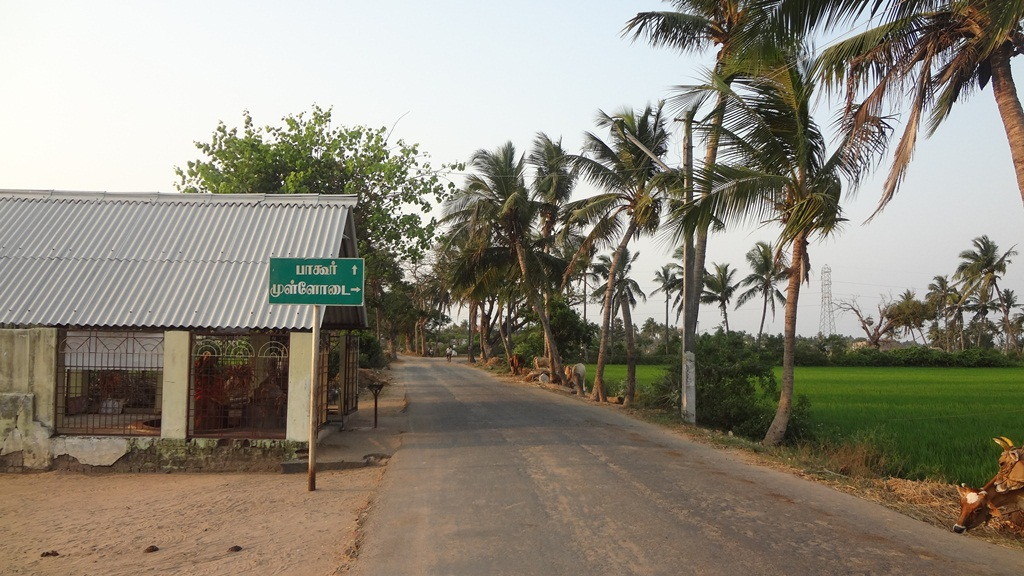
Pudukuppam(Bahour)-Sooriyankuppam Road meets Bahour-Kuruvinatham Road

== Politics ==
Kuruvinatham was once a Union Territory Assembly constituency. After Delimitation 2005, Kuruvinatham constituency was abolished and is made as a part of Bahour (Union Territory Assembly constituency) which comes under Puducherry (Lok Sabha constituency)
