= Manappattu =

- Village
- Location in Puducherry, India Manappattu (India)
- Coordinates: 11.799453°N 79.787983°E
- Country: India
- State: Puducherry
- District: Pondicherry
- Taluk: Bahour
- Commune: Bahour

Languages
  - Official: French, Tamil, English
- Time zone: UTC+5:30 (IST)
- PIN: 607 402
- Telephone code: 0413
- Vehicle registration: PY-01
- Sex ratio: 50% ♂/♀

Manappattu is a village in Bahour Commune of Bahour taluk in the Union Territory of Puducherry, India. It lies east of NH-45A at a distance of 2 km from it.

== Geography ==
Manappattu is bordered by Bahour in the west, Pillaiyarkuppam in the north, Bay of Bengal in east and Krishnavaram, Pudukuppam in the south.

== Villages ==
Following are the list of villages under Manappattu Village Panchayat.

- Manappattu
- Kanniakoil
- Kattukuppam
- Varakalodaipet

== Road Network ==
Manappattu is connected by Kanniakoil - Manappattu road. Also Pannithittu - Pudukuppam road connects Manappattu.

== Gallery ==
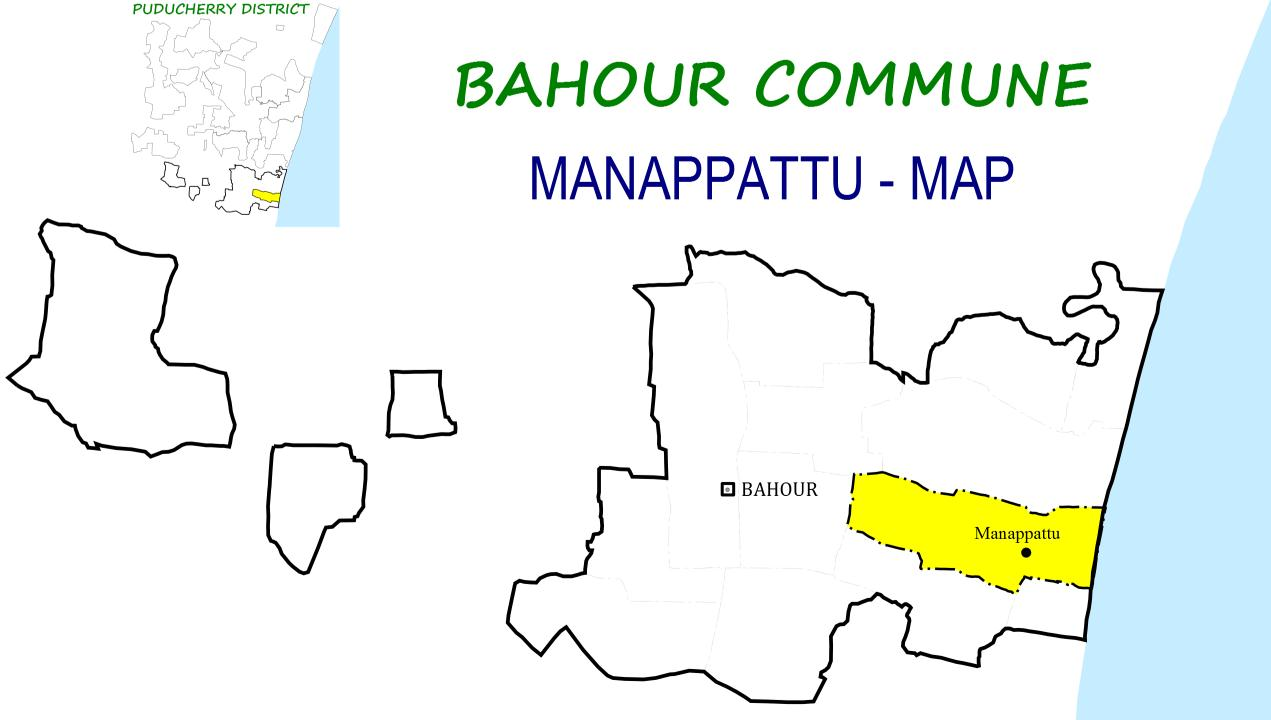
Map of Manappattu Village Panchayat

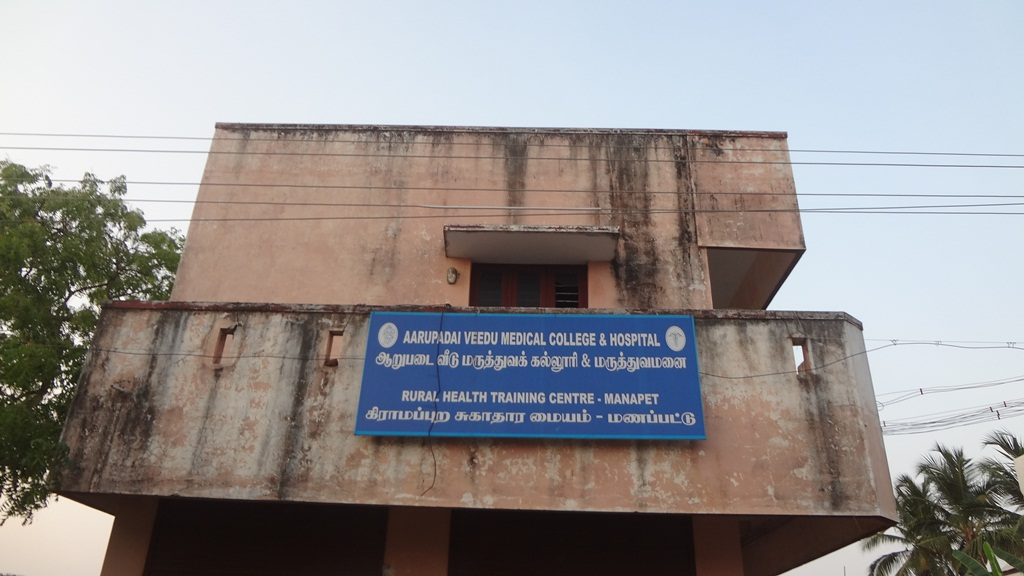
Rural Health Training Centre, Manapattu, Bahour Commune

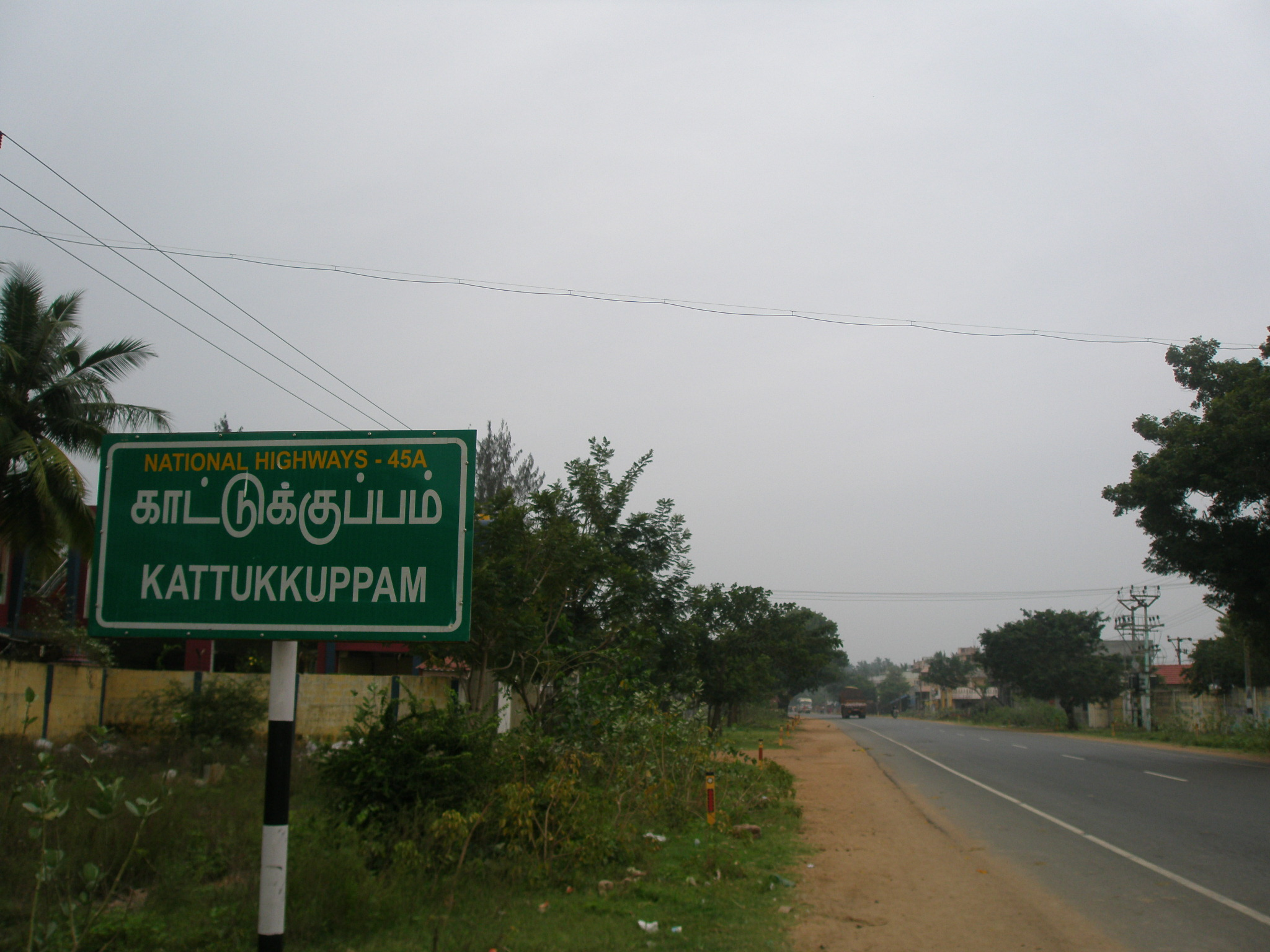
Kattukuppam, Manapattu Village Panchayat, Bahour Commune

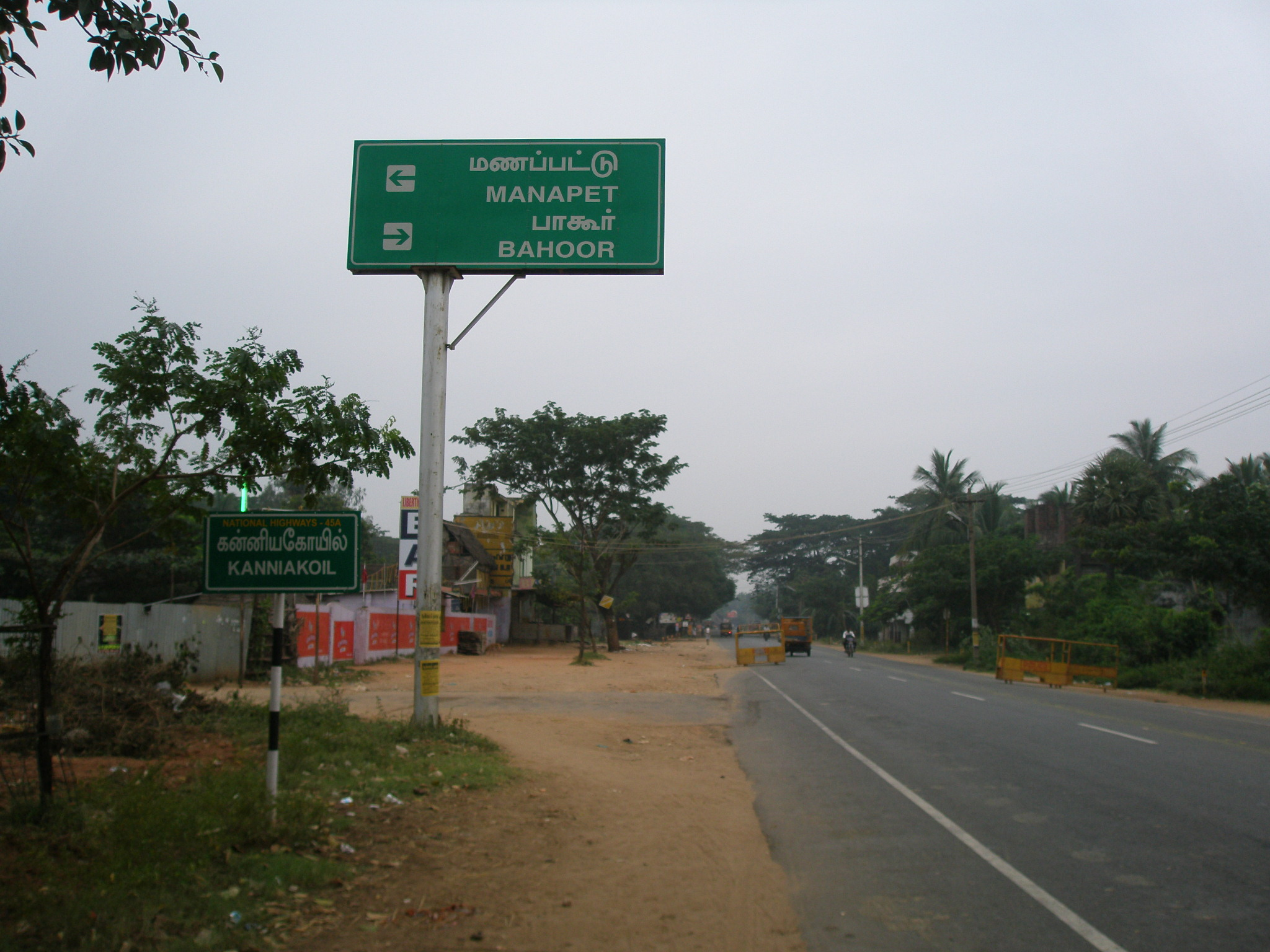
Manappattu Road and Bahour Road meeting at Kanniyakoil

== Politics ==
Manappattu is a part of Bahour (Union Territory Assembly constituency) which comes under Puducherry (Lok Sabha constituency)
