= Kirumampakkam =

- Village
- Location in Puducherry, India Kirumampakkam (India)
- Coordinates: 11.820204°N 79.785891°E
- Country: India
- State: Puducherry
- District: Pondicherry
- Taluk: Bahour
- Commune: Bahour

Languages
  - Official: French, Tamil, English
- Time zone: UTC+5:30 (IST)
- PIN: 607 402
- Telephone code: 0413
- Vehicle registration: PY-01
- Sex ratio: 50% ♂/♀

Kirumampakkam is a village in Bahour Commune of Bahour taluk in the Union Territory of Puducherry, India. It lies on Cuddalore road (NH-45A) at a distance of 15 km from Pondicherry.

== Geography ==
Kirumampakkam is bordered by Nagappanur village of Tamil Nadu in the west, Madalapattu village of Tamil Nadu in the north, Pannithittu in the east and Pillaiyarkuppam in the south.

== Road network ==
Kirumampakkam is connected to Puducherry by Cuddalore road (NH-45A). Also, Kirumampakkam-Bahour road (RC-27) connects Kirumampakkam with Bahour, its Commune Headquarters. Kirumampakkam provides gateway to Nagappanur village of Tamil Nadu.

== Gallery ==
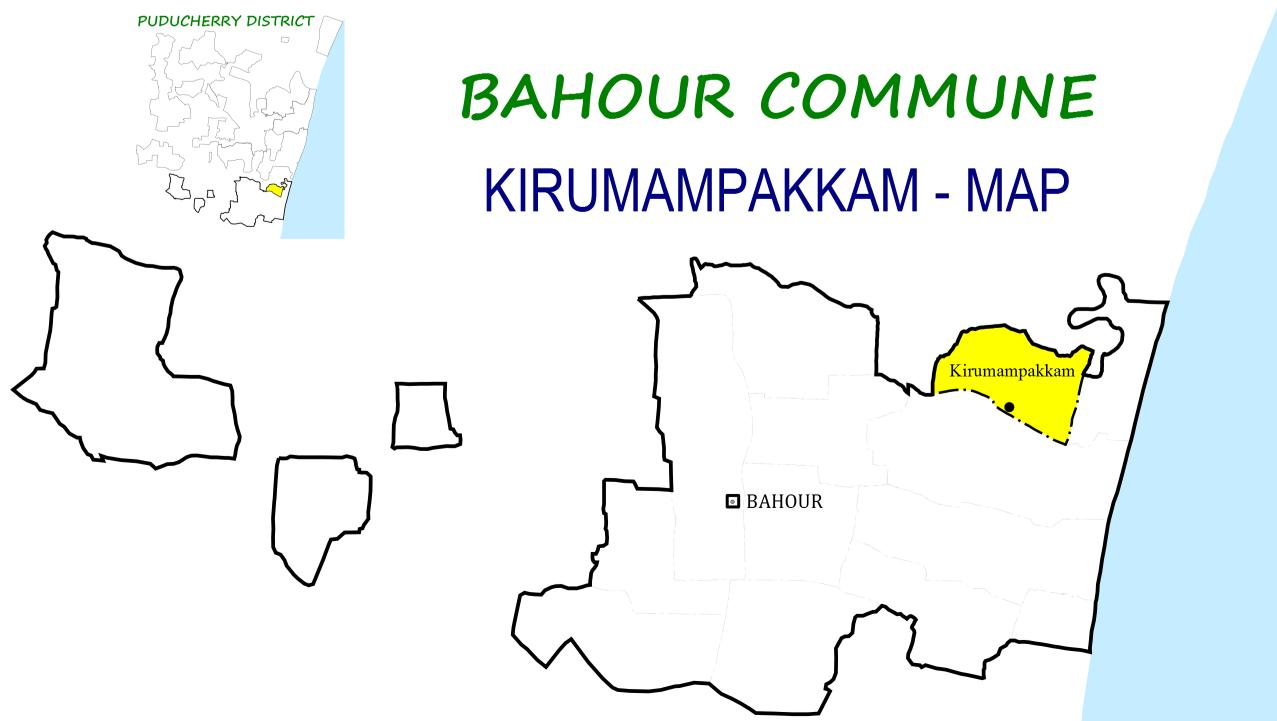
Map of Kirumampakkam Village Panchayat

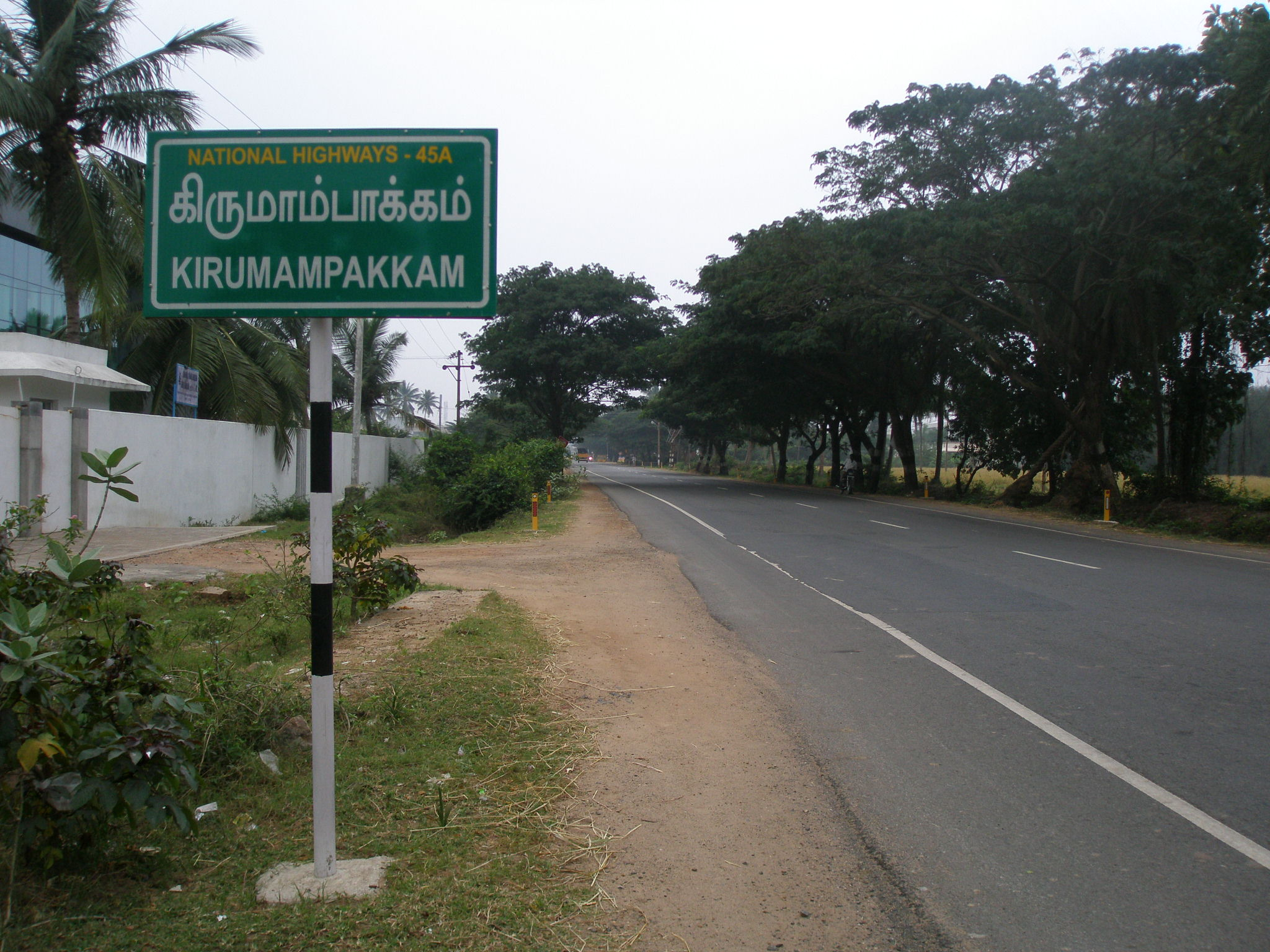
Kirumambakkam, Bahour Commune

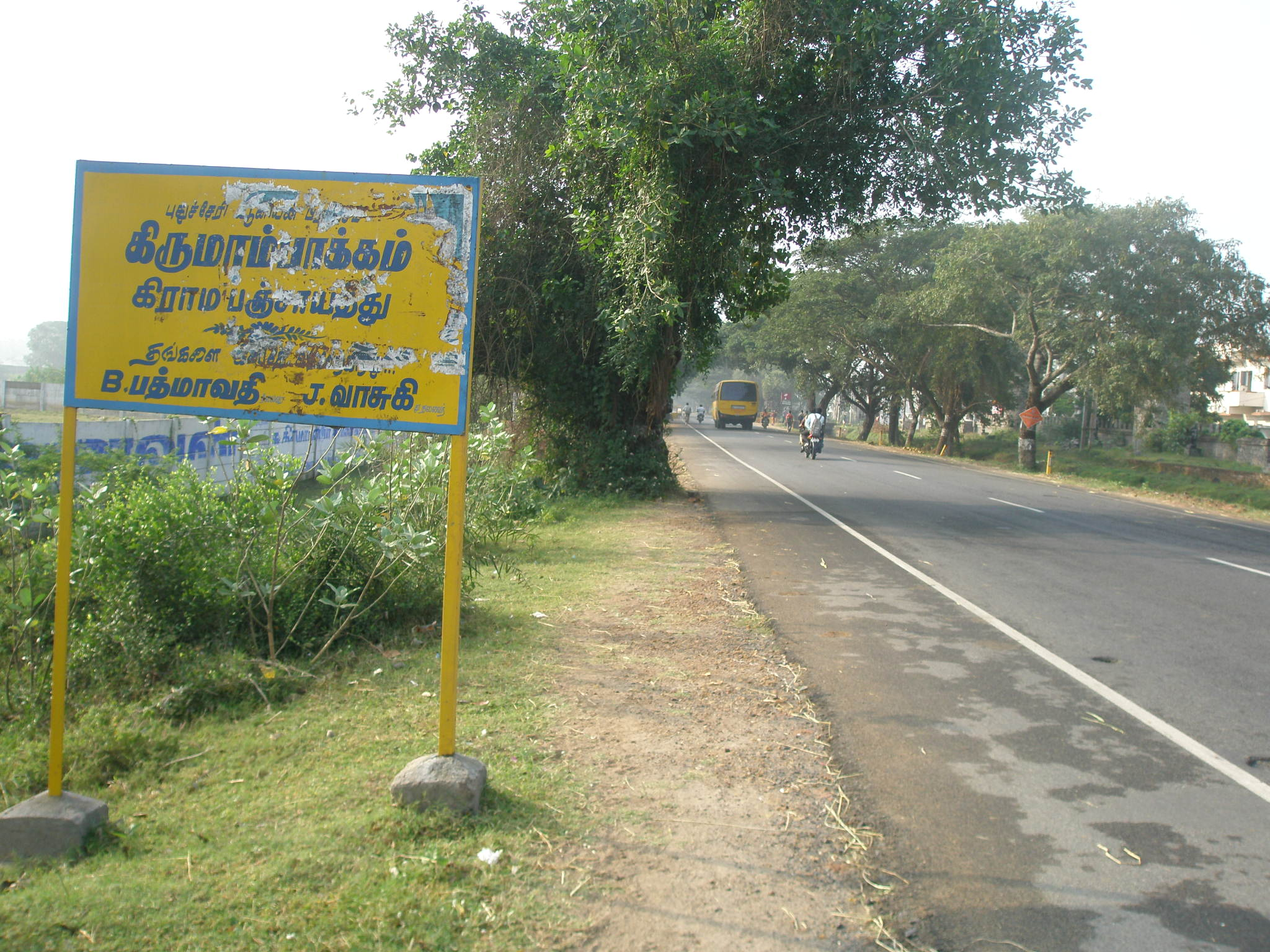
Welcome to Kirumambakkam Village Panchayat, Bahour Commune

== Politics ==
Kirumampakkam is a part of Embalam (Union Territory Assembly constituency) which comes under Puducherry (Lok Sabha constituency)
