= Pudukuppam, Bahour =

Pudukuppam
- Village
- Nickname: M.Pudukuppam
- Location in Puducherry, India Pudukuppam (India)
- Coordinates: 11.78937°N 79.793154°E
- Country: India
- State: Puducherry
- District: Pondicherry
- Taluk: Bahour
- Commune: Bahour

Languages
  - Official: French, Tamil, English
- Time zone: UTC+5:30 (IST)
- PIN: 607 402
- Telephone code: 0413
- Vehicle registration: PY-01
- Sex ratio: 50% ♂/♀

Pudukuppam is a village in Bahour Commune of Bahour taluk in the Union Territory of Puducherry, India. It lies east of NH-45A at a distance of 2 km from it.

== Geography ==
Pudukuppam is bordered by Krishnavaram in the west, Manappattu in the north, Bay of Bengal in east and Mullodai in the south.

Murthikuppam Pudukuppam fishing village is located about twenty four kilometers towards south of Pondicherry Town. It falls under Bahur Cummune. It is well connected to Villupuram – Nagapattinam road (NH 45A extn.). A water tank, a village school, a few shops, marketplace, and the office of the local Panchayat (the traditional village government) are present in the Village. Electricity and piped water supply are available at this village.

Total fishermen families of this village are about 411 of which 386 families are active fishermen and the remaining 25 are passive fishermen. About 200 FRP boats with outboard engine and about 50 non-mechanized country boats (catamaran) are available at this village. The boats are well placed on the seashore. Fish landing depends on the season. Fish catching time depends on season either from early morning hours between 3.00am to 11.00am or in evening between 3.00pm to 7.00pm. This fishing village has no facility for storing the fish in chilling units.

Murthikuppam Pudukuppam is located towards south side of the village and falls in survey no. 244 and 245 of Manapet Revenue Village, which is in CRZ III. Turtle nesting is reported over and area of about 38380 m2

== Employment ==
Pudukuppam village is famous for fishing and more than 95% of the residents main work is fishing. More than 250 boats work from the village. The government of Puducherry began construction of a harbor worth 7cr, but cancelled the project before completion.

== Road Network ==
Pudukuppam is connected by Mullodai Arch - Pudukuppam road. Also Pannithittu - Pudukuppam road connects Pudukuppam.

== Gallery ==
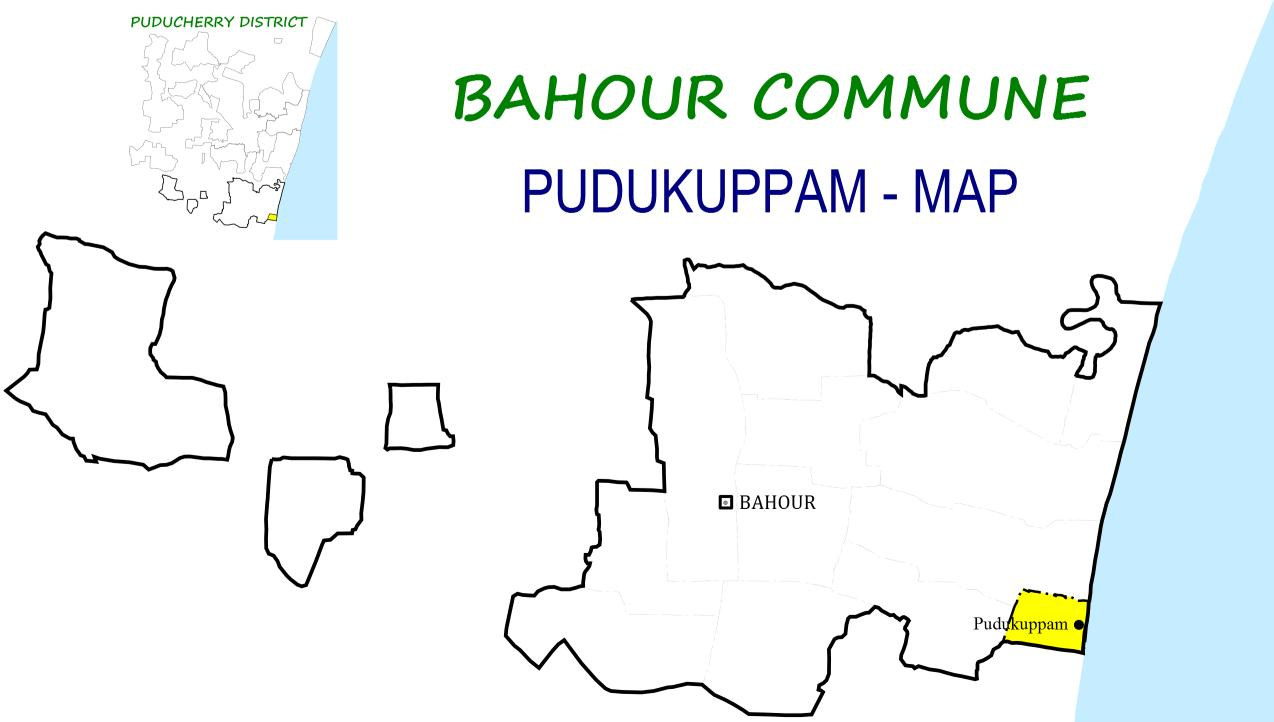
Map of Pudukuppam Village Panchayat

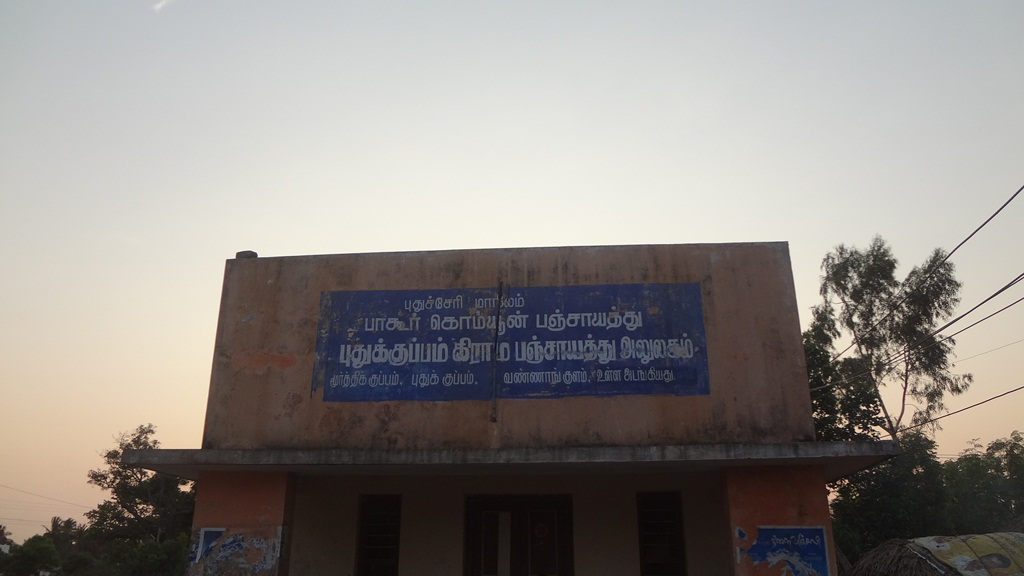
Pudukuppam Village Panchayat Office, Bahour Commune

== Politics ==
Pudukuppam is a part of Bahour (Union Territory Assembly constituency) which comes under Puducherry (Lok Sabha constituency)
