= Soriyankuppam =

Soriyankuppam Jothilingakuppam
- Village
- Location in Puducherry, India Soriyankuppam (India)
- Coordinates: 11.787018°N 79.731045°E
- Country: India
- State: Puducherry
- District: Pondicherry
- Taluk: Bahour
- Commune: Bahour

Population (2001)
  - Total: 36,983

Languages
  - Official: French, Tamil, English
- Time zone: UTC+5:30 (IST)
- PIN: 607 402
- Telephone code: 0413
- Vehicle registration: PY-01
- Sex ratio: 50% ♂/♀

Soriyankuppam is a village in Bahour Commune of Bahour taluk in the Union Territory of Puducherry, India. Soriyankuppam serves as a bypass for Puducherry - Panruti route via Savadi. It lies on southern tip of Bahour Enclave of Puducherry district.

== Geography ==
Soriyankuppam is bordered by Irandairavilagam village of Tamil Nadu in the west, Kuruvinatham in the north, Parikkalpattu in the east and Pennaiyar River in the south.

== Road Network ==
Soriyankuppam is connected to Bahour, its Commune Headquarters via Kuruvinatham road. Cuddalore-Pallinelliyanur Major District Road (MDR) passes through Soriyankuppam. Soriyankuppam is directly connected to Puducherry by Puducherry - Soriyankuppam Bus route.

== Gallery ==
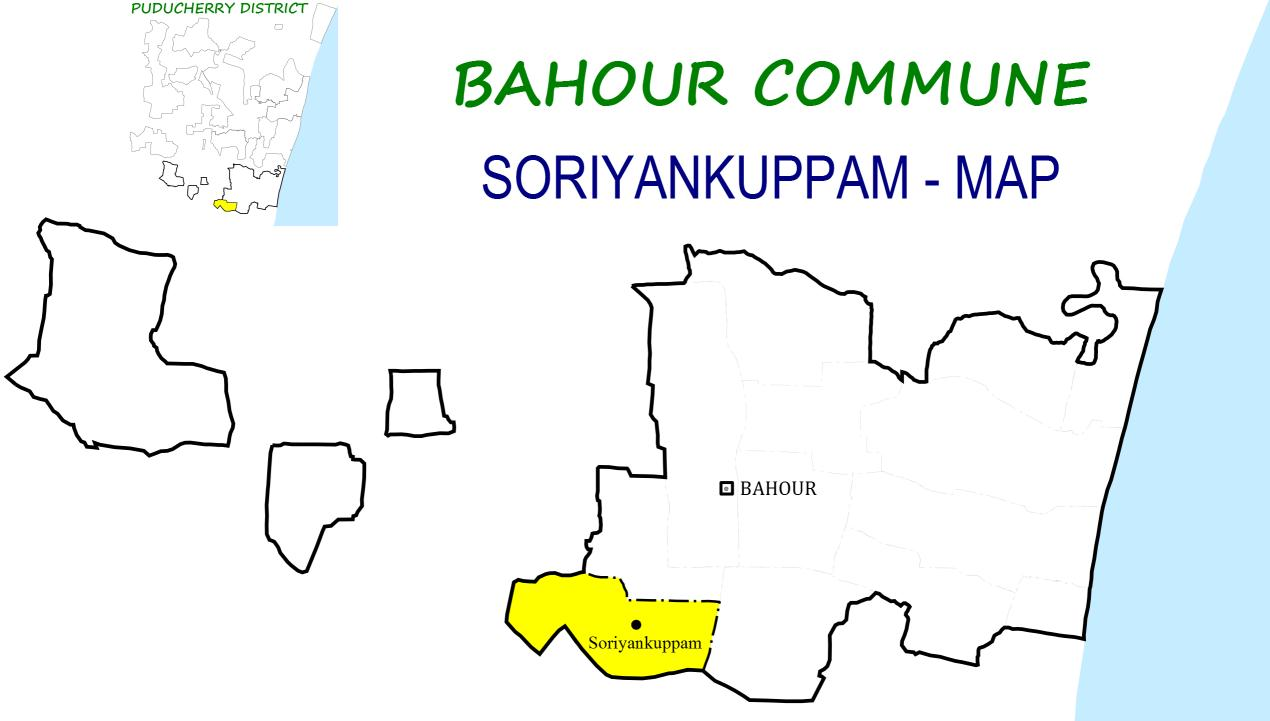
Map of Soriyankuppam Village Panchayat

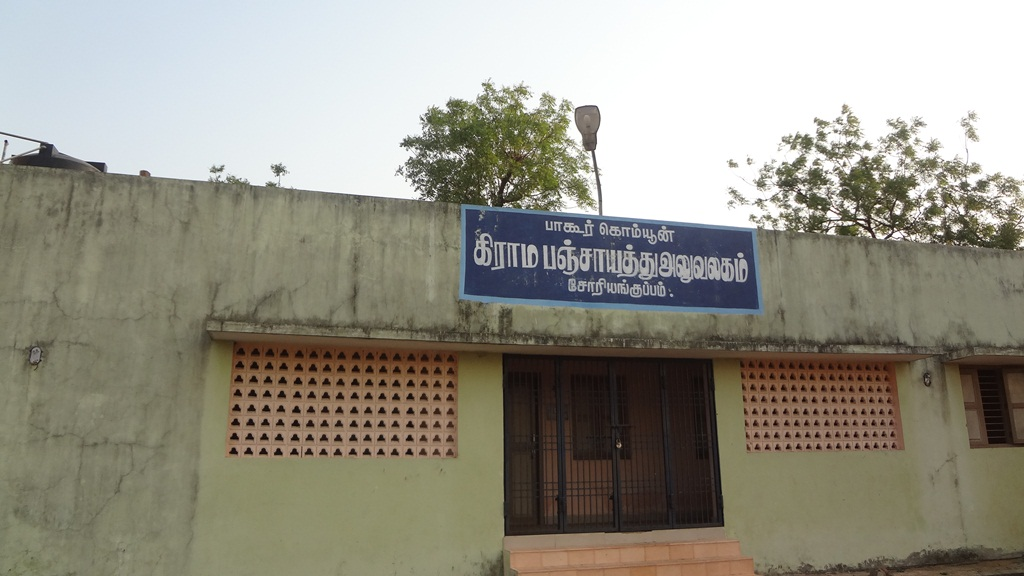
Sooriyankuppam Village Panchayat Office, Bahour Commune

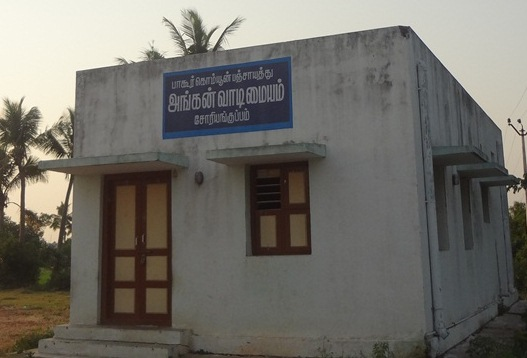
Anganvadi, Sooriyankuppam, Bahour Commune

== Politics ==
Soriyankuppam is a part of Bahour (Union Territory Assembly constituency) which comes under Puducherry (Lok Sabha constituency)
