= Bahour taluk =

Coordinates: 11°48′24.57″N 79°44′34.66″E

Bahour taluk (Tamil: [baːhuːɾ]) is one of four taluks in the Pondicherry District of the union territory of Puducherry. It comprises villages under Bahour and Nettapakkam Commune. Bahour taluk is further divided into three sub-taluks or firkas, viz. Bahour, Selliamedu and Nettapakkam.
