= Nallavadu =

- Village
- Location in Puducherry, India Nallavadu (India)
- Coordinates: 11.857901°N 79.81267°E
- Country: India
- State: Puducherry
- District: Pondicherry
- Taluk: Puducherry
- Commune: Ariyankuppam

Languages
  - Official: Tamil
  - Additional: English, French
- Time zone: UTC+5:30 (IST)
- PIN: 605 007
- Telephone code: 0413
- Vehicle registration: PY-01
- Sex ratio: 50% ♂/♀

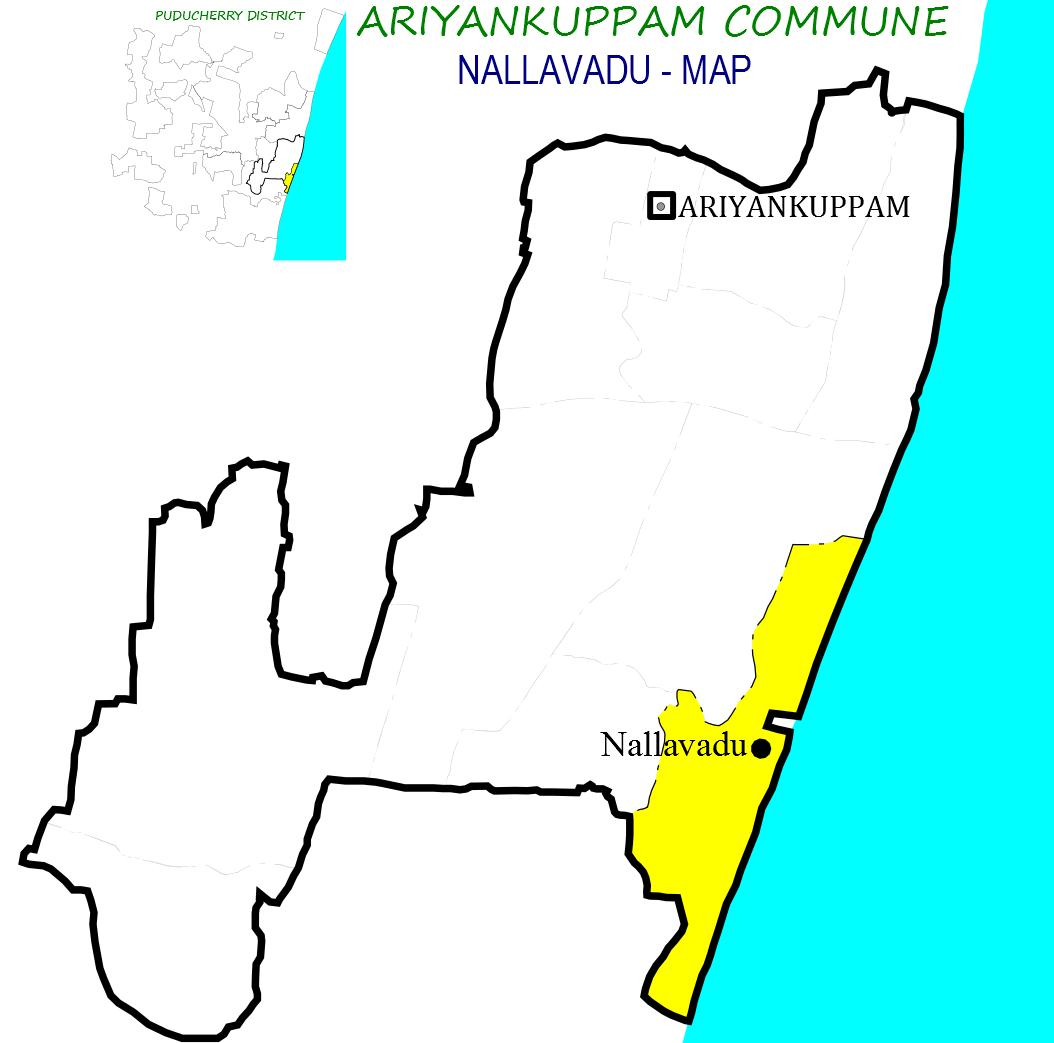
Nallavadu Village in Ariyankuppam Commune

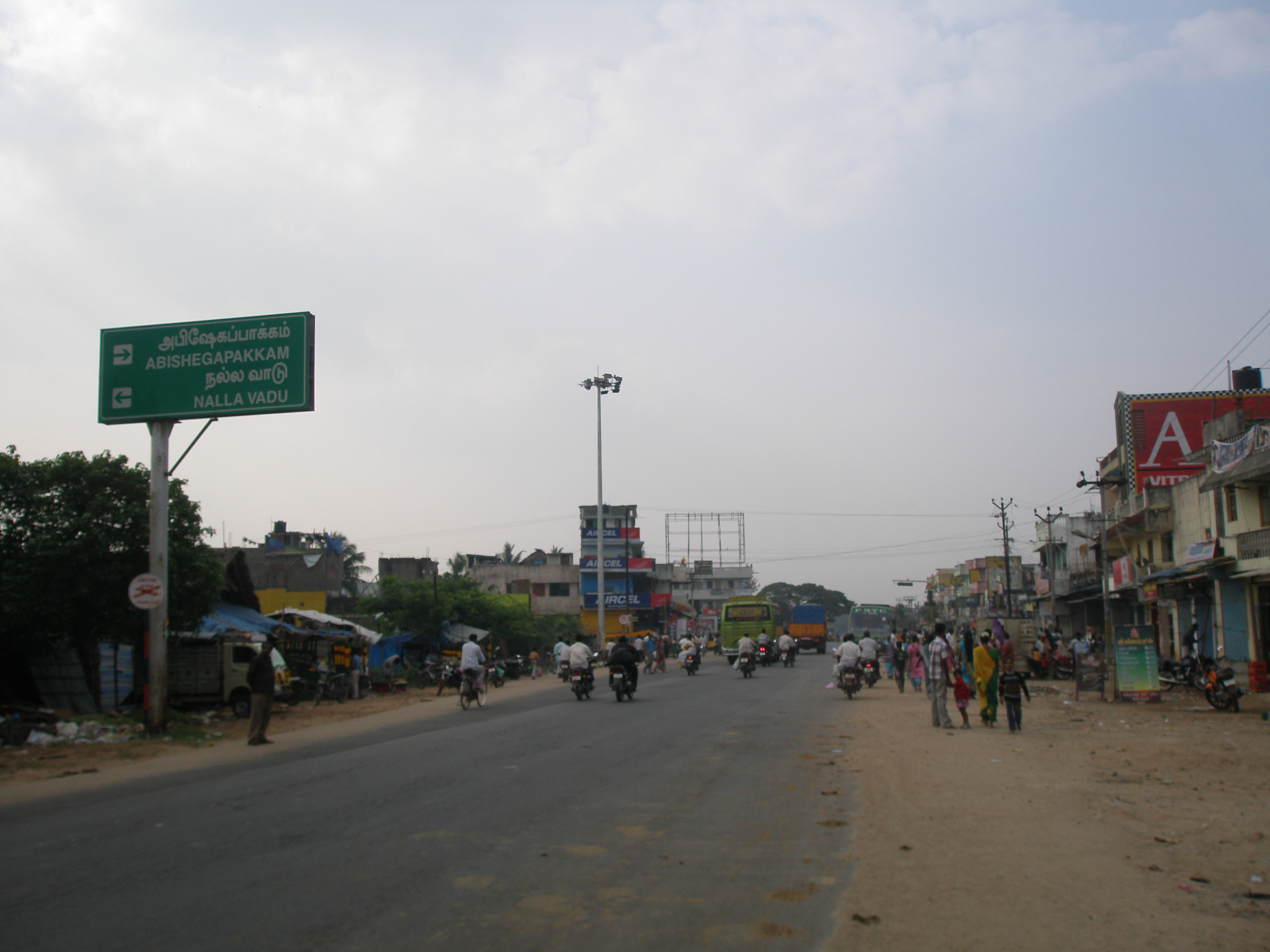
Way to Nallavadu

Nallavadu is a village in Ariyankuppam Commune in the Union Territory of Puducherry, India. Part of the village lies in the Cuddalore district of Tamil Nadu, and is governed by Singirikudi village panchayat. It is by far the tiniest exclave of Tamil Nadu within Puducherry.

== Geography ==
Nallavadu is bordered by Chunnambar river in the north, Bay of Bengal and Nallavadu (Tamil Nadu) in the east, Panithittu and Madalapet (Tamil Nadu) in the south, Pooranankuppam, Pillaiyarthittu and Andiarpalayam in the west. Nallavadu is surrounded by sea and back-waters and it is one of the small islands in Puducherry.

== Demographics ==
Nallavadu has an average literacy rate of 80.51%, male literacy is 84.89%, and female literacy is 76.13%. In Nallavadu, 12% of the population is under 6 years of age. People here are well educated. It has school, hospital, library, hotels, groceries shops & markets are available for people's daily routines.

== Transport ==
Nallavadu is located at 2.2 km from Thavalakuppam on Thavalakuppam–Nallavadu Road. One can reach Thavalakuppam Koot Road by any local bus from Pondicherry to Bahoor, Madukarai and Karaiyanputtur running via Ariyankuppam or any route bus from Pondicherry to Cuddalore, Chidambaram and Karaikal running via ECR. From Thavalakuppam Koot Road, you have to walk 2.2 km towards east to reach Nallavadu. Auto rickshaws are available around the clock (24x7) at Thavalakuppam to reach Nallavadu. Nallavadu can also be reached directly by PRTC Bus (Route No. 14A) running between Pondicherry and Nallavadu.

== Road Network ==
Nallavadu is connected to Pondicherry by Thavalakuppam–Nallavadu Road. Alternate route Thavalakuppam–Poornankuppam-Pudukuppaam-Nallavadu

== Tourism ==
=== Angalamman Koil ===
Arulmigu Angalamman Koil is one of the oldest temple in Nallavadu. Vellalan Kottai & Mayana Kollai of Angalaman koil are well-known here in this village.

=== Arulmigu Manonmani Amman Koil ===
Arulmigu Manonmani Amman Koil is one of the oldest temple in Nallavadu. Sedal & kavadi ursavam of Manonmani amman temple are well-known in this village.

=== Arulmigu Muthalamman Amman Koil ===
Arulmigu Muthalamman Koil is one of the oldest temple in Nallavadu. Sedal ursavam & ther ottam of Muthalamman temple are well-known in this village.

=== Kutti Aandavar Koil ===
Kutti aandavar kovil is one of the oldest temple and it is located in south border of Nallavadu. aadi thiruvizha is well-known in this village.

=== Nallavadu Beach ===
Nallavadu beach is very famous for virgin sandy beach in pondicherry. It is 2.5 km long and it is hard to find footpath on south side of the beach as no residents in those areas.

=== Fish Market ===
The People of Pondicherry go fishing everyday and bring back fresh sea foods for the Nallavadu fish market.

=== Kailash Beach Resort ===
Kailash Beach Resort located at 1 km (1 mi) from Nallavadu is a private beach resort in Puducherry.

=== Le Pondy Beach Resort ===
Le Pondy Beach Resort located at 1.5 km (1 mi) from Nallavadu is a private beach resort in Puducherry.

=== Seagull/Paradise Beach ===
Seagull/Paradise Beach located at 1.5 km (1 mi) from Nallavadu is a public beach resort in Puducherry.

=== Chunnambar Boat House ===
Chunnambar Boat House is located at 2 km (1 mi) from Nallavadu is a public beach resort in Puducherry.

== Villages under Nallavadu Village Panchayat ==
- Nallavadu
- Pudukuppam

== Politics ==
Nallavadu is part of Manavely assembly constituency, and forms part of Puducherry Lok Sabha constituency.
