= Andiarpalayam =

- Village
- Location in Puducherry, India Andiarpalayam (India)
- Coordinates: 11.856683°N 79.804301°E
- Country: India
- State: Puducherry
- District: Pondicherry
- Taluk: Puducherry
- Commune: Ariyankuppam

Languages
  - Official: Tamil
  - Additional: English, French
- Time zone: UTC+5:30 (IST)
- PIN: 605 007
- Telephone code: 0413
- Vehicle registration: PY-01
- Sex ratio: 50% ♂/♀

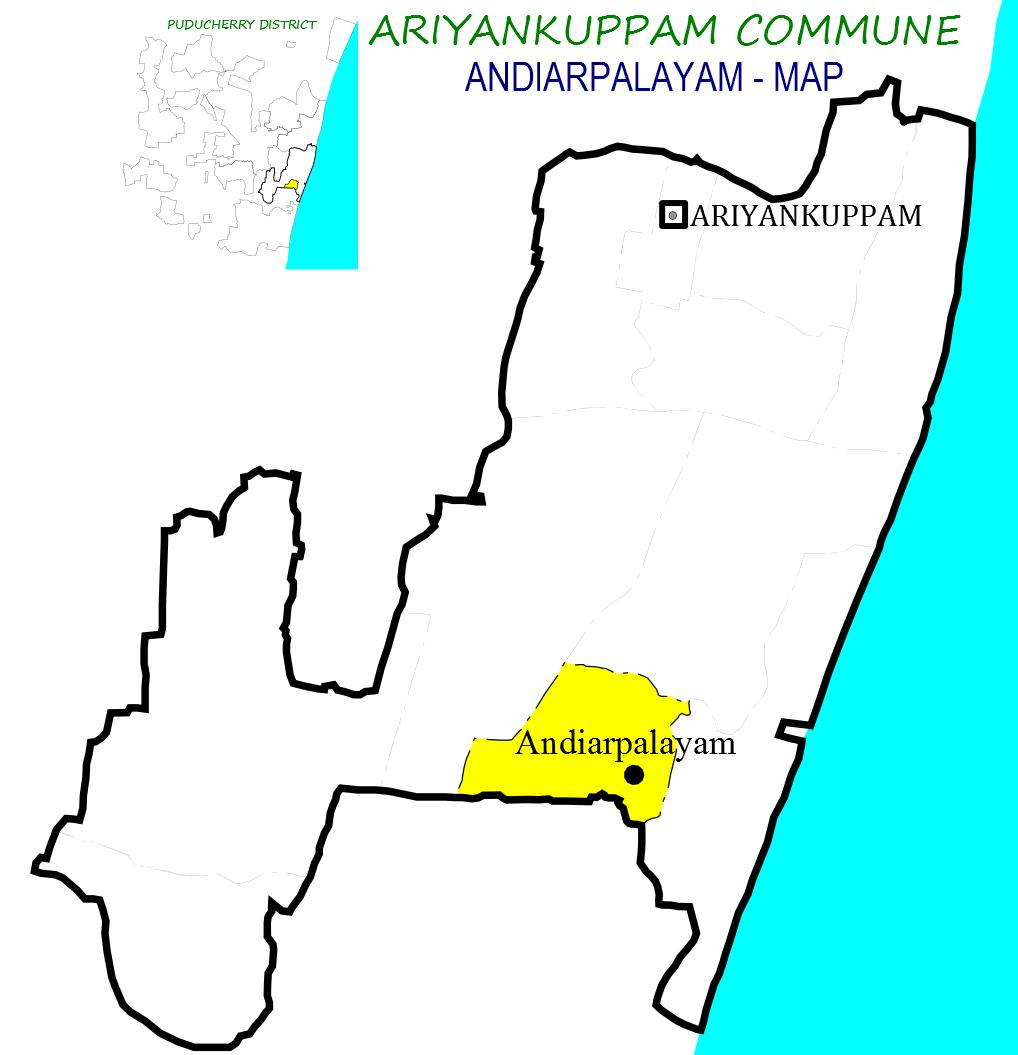
Andiyarpalayam Village in Ariyankuppam Commune

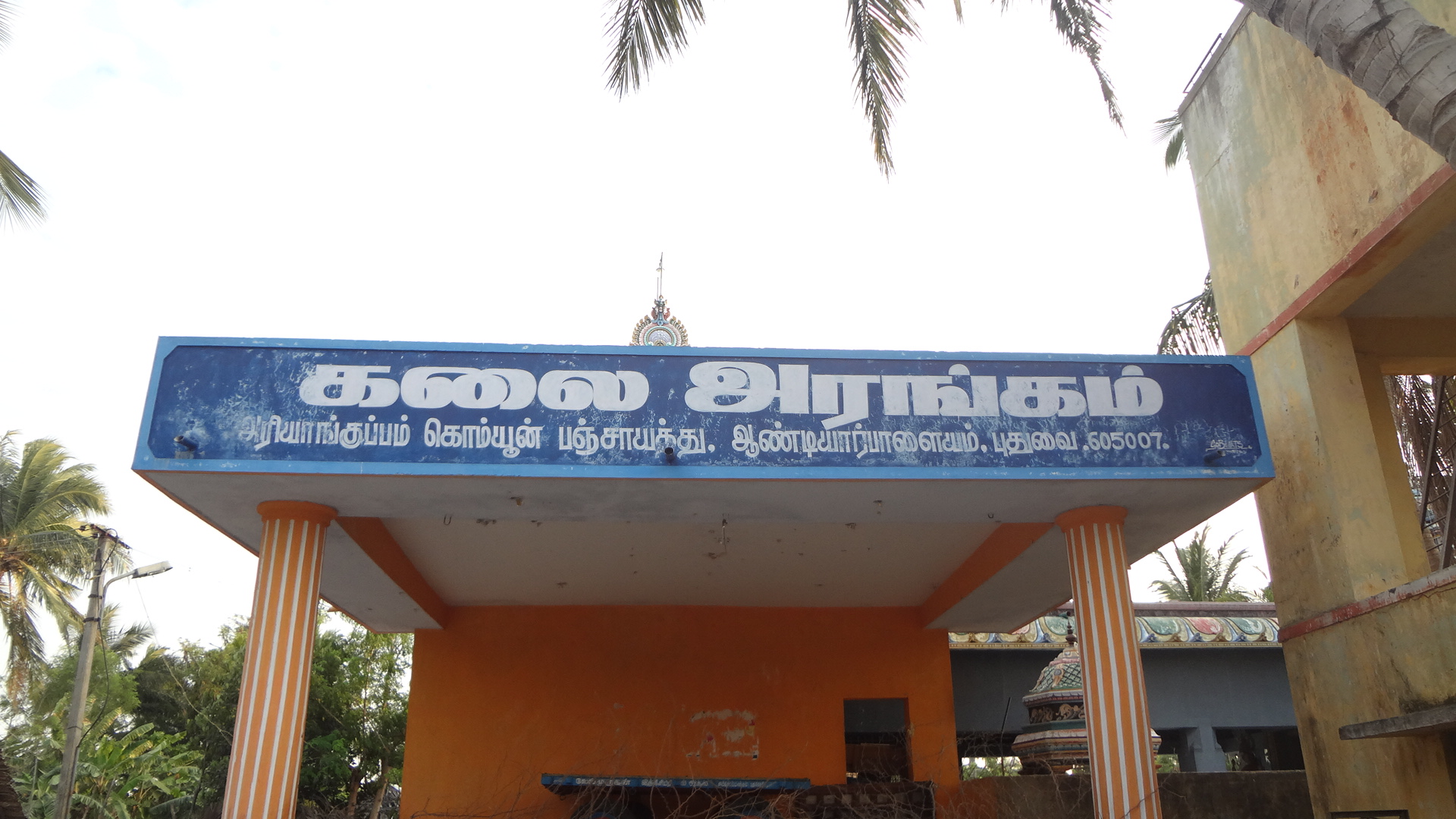
Andiyarpalayam

Andiarpalayam is a village in Ariyankuppam Commune in the Union Territory of Puducherry, India.

== Geography ==
Andiarpalayam is bordered by Pooranankuppam in the north, Nallavadu in the east, Madalapet (Tamil Nadu) in the south and Thavalakuppam in the West

== Demographics ==
Andiarpalayam has an average literacy rate of 81.49%, male literacy is 88.89%, and female literacy is 74.13%. In Andiarpalayam, 10% of the population is under 6 years of age.

== Transport ==
Andiarpalayam is located at 1.5 km from Thavalakuppam on Thavalakuppam – Nallavadu Road. One can reach Thavalakuppam Koot Road by any local bus from Pondicherry to Bahoor, Madukarai and Karaiyanputtur running via Ariyankuppam. From Thavalakuppam Koot Road, it is a 1.5 km walk east to reach Andiarpalayam. Andiarpalayam can also be reached directly by PRTC Bus (Route No. 14A) running between Pondicherry and Nallavadu.

== Road Network ==
Andiarpalayam is connected to Pondicherry by Thavalakuppam–Nallavadu Road. There is another road from Andiarpalayam to Thavalakuppam via Korukamedu.

== Tourism ==
=== Singirikudi Lakshminarashimhar Koil ===
Singirikudi Lakshminarashimhar Koil is located at 3 km from Andiarpalayam. Singirikudi is famous for the Ugira Narashimhar.

== Villages under Andiarpalayam Village Panchayat ==
- Andiyarpalayam
- Kasanthittu
- Korukamedu
- Pillaiyarthittu
- Thanampalayam

== Politics ==
Andiarpalayam is a part of Manavely (State Assembly Constituency) which comes under Puducherry (Lok Sabha constituency)
