= Nonankuppam =

Nonankuppam Ariyankuppam (West)
- Village
- Location in Puducherry, India Nonankuppam (India)
- Coordinates: 11.884528°N 79.797606°E
- Country: India
- State: Puducherry
- District: Pondicherry
- Taluk: Puducherry
- Commune: Ariyankuppam

Languages
- Time zone: UTC+5:30 (IST)
- PIN: 605 007
- Telephone code: 0413
- Vehicle registration: PY-01
- Sex ratio: 50% ♂/♀

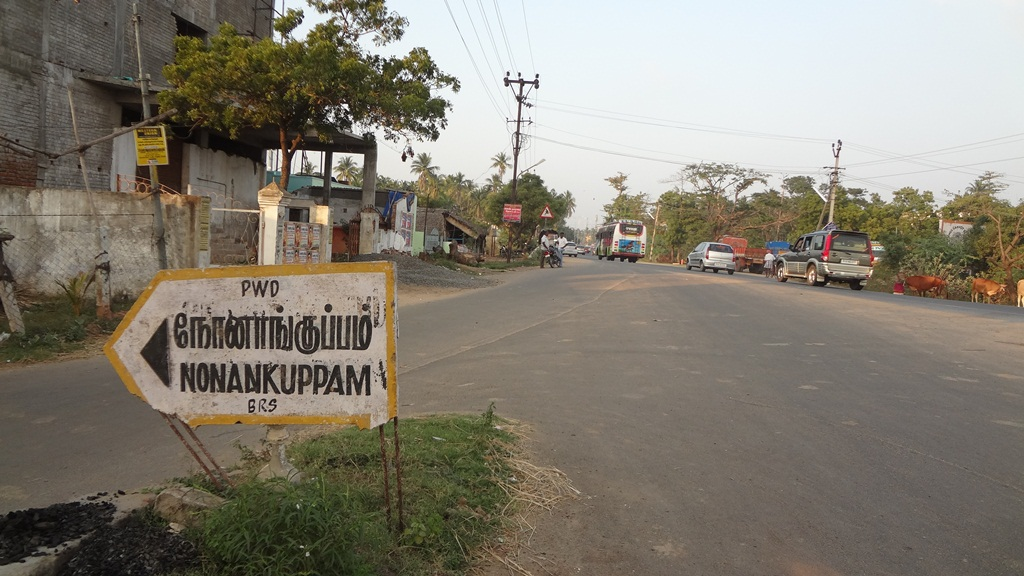
Nonankuppam Village, Ariyankuppam Commune

Nonankuppam is a part of Ariyankuppam (West) village in Ariyankuppam Commune Panchayat in the Union Territory of Puducherry, India.

== Geography ==
Nonankuppam is located at 11°53'4"N and 79°47'43"E. Nonankuppam is 7 km. from Pondicherry. It is in between Pondicherry and Cuddalore on NH-45A. One can reach Nonankuppam by any local bus from Pondicherry to Cuddalore, Bahoor or Madukarai running via Ariyankuppam.

== Road network ==
Nonakuppam is connected to NH-45A by RC25 road. Nonankuppam serves as a gateway to two hamlet namely Angalakuppam and Pudukuppam which are under Killingikuppam Village Panchayat of Cuddalore district, Tamil Nadu.

== Places of interest ==
Nonankuppam Village Nonankuppam village is a village with green paddy and coconuts tree (its look a like mini kerala) fields in the bank of the river chunnambar. It houses an Angala Amman temple, Pillaiyar koil. The temple festival starts on the mahashivaratri day and runs for seven days.

=== Chunnambar Boat House ===
Chunnambar Boat House (Tamil: சுன்னாம்பாறு படகு துறை) is a major tourist spot in Puducherry and it is located in Nonankuppam which is at a distance of 7 km from Puducherry town.

=== Angala Amman Koyil ===
Angala Amman koyil is the major temple in Nonankuppam.
