= Abishegapakkam =

- Village
- Location in Puducherry, India Abishegapakkam (India)
- Coordinates: 11.861408°N 79.780161°E
- Country: India
- State: Puducherry
- District: Pondicherry
- Taluk: Puducherry
- Commune: Ariyankuppam

Languages
  - Official: Tamil
  - Additional: English, French
- Time zone: UTC+5:30 (IST)
- PIN: 605 007
- Telephone code: 0413
- Vehicle registration: PY-01
- Sex ratio: 50% ♂/♀

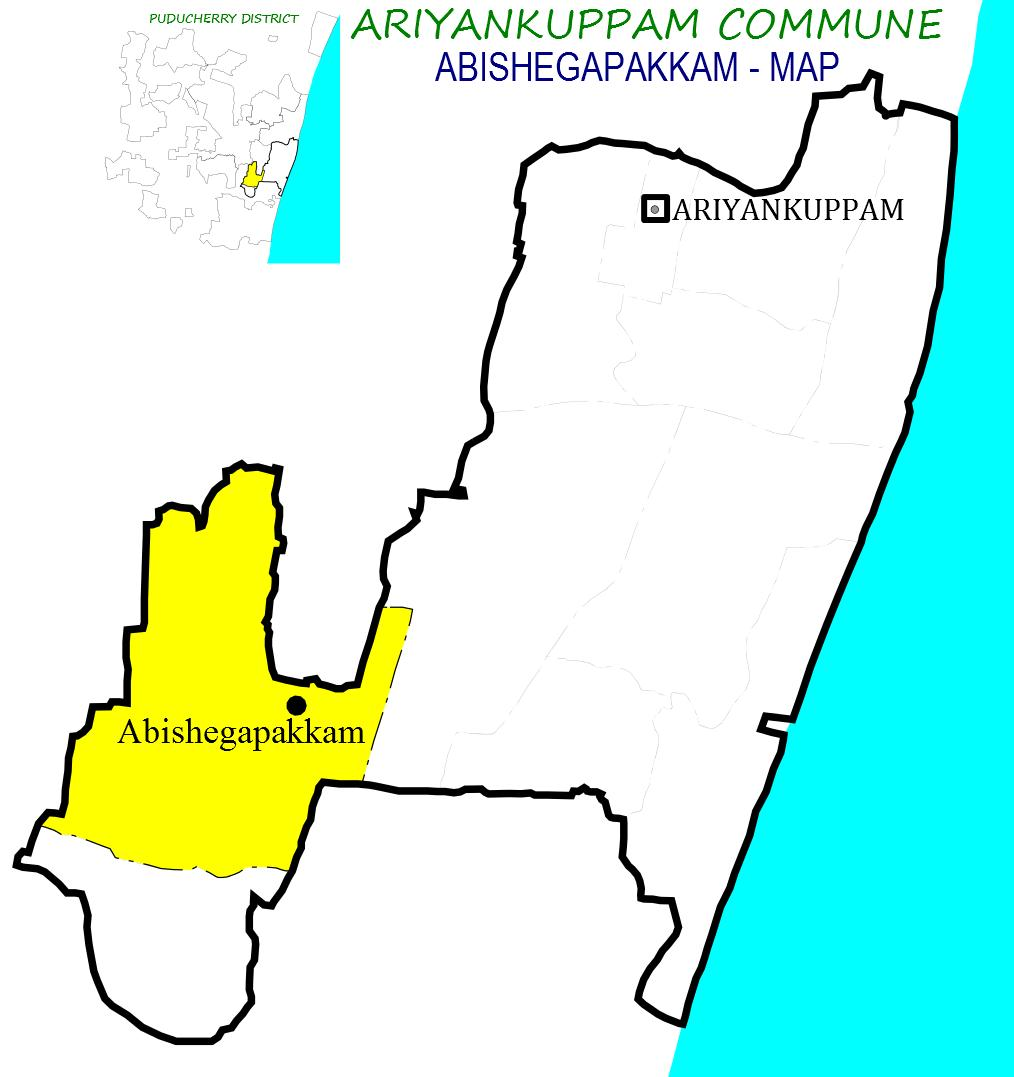
Abishegapakkam Village in Ariyankuppam Commune

Abishegapakkam is a panchayat village in Ariyankuppam Commune in the Union Territory of Puducherry, India. It is also a revenue village under Ariyankuppam Firka

== Geography ==
Abishegapakkam is bordered by Pudukkadi Village, Tamil Nadu in the west, Villianur Commune in the north, Thavalakuppam and Singirikudi (Tamil Nadu) in the east and Thimma Nayakan Palayam in the south

== Demographics ==
Abishegapakkam has an average literacy rate of 81.49%. The male literacy is 88.89%, the female literacy is 74.13%, and 10% of the population is under 6 years of age.

== Road Network ==
Abishegapakkam is connected to Pondicherry by Thavalakuppam–Embalam State Highway (RC-20). It is also connected to Villianur by the Abishegapakkam-Uruvaiyaru road.

== Tourism ==
=== Singirikudi Lakshminarashimhar Koil ===
Singirikudi Lakshminarashimhar Koil is located at 0.2 km from Abishegapakkam. Singirikudi is famous for the Ugira Narashimhar. Abishegapakkam is the main access point to reach this temple.

== Politics ==
Abishegapakkam is a part of Manavely (State Assembly Constituency) which comes under Puducherry (Lok Sabha constituency).

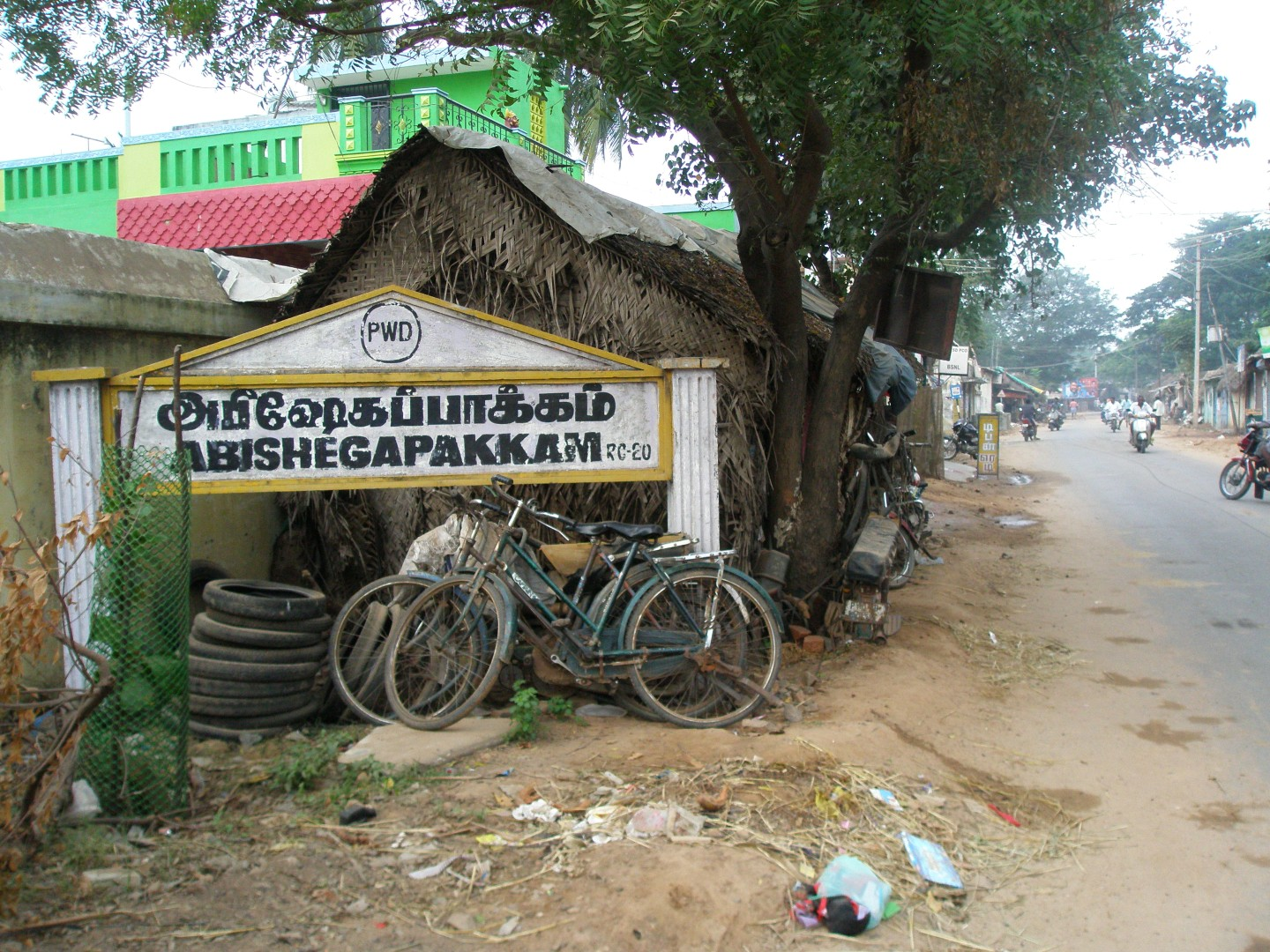
Abishegapakkam village on RC-20

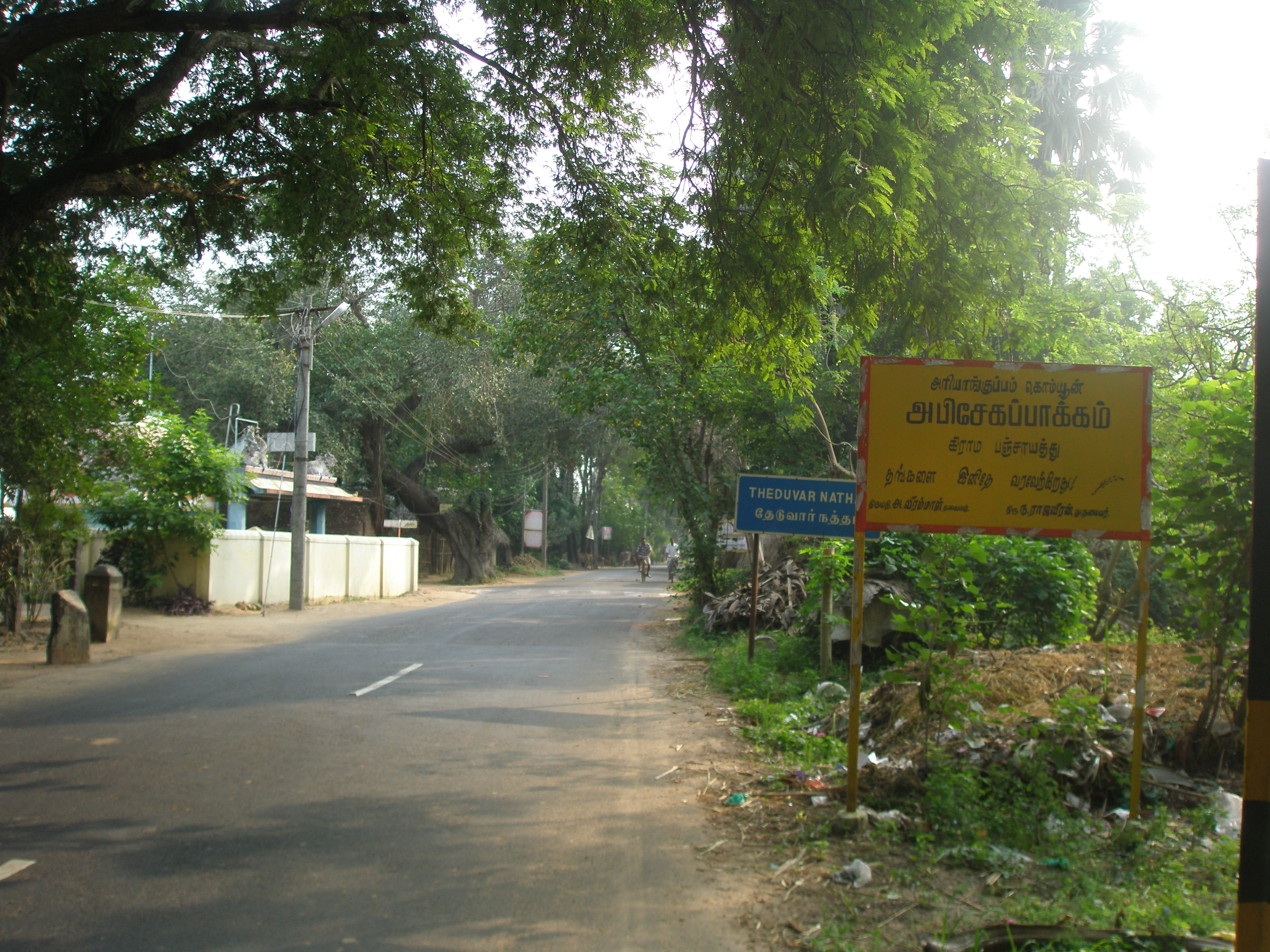
Abishegapakkam Entry from Pudukkadai
