= Poornankuppam =

Poornankuppam M.pudukuppam
- Village
- Location within Puducherry Location within India
- Country: India
- State: Puducherry
- District: Pondicherry
- Taluk: Puducherry
- Commune: Ariyankuppam

Languages
  - Official: Tamil
  - Additional: English, French
- Time zone: UTC+5:30 (IST)
- PIN: 605 007
- Telephone code: 0413
- Vehicle registration: PY-01
- Sex ratio: 50% ♂/♀

Poornankuppam is a panchayat village in Ariyankuppam Commune in the Union Territory of Puducherry, India. It is also a revenue village under Ariyankuppam firka.

== Geography ==
Poornankuppam is bordered by Chunnambar river in the north, Nallavadu in the east, Andiarpalayam in the south and Thavalakuppam in the West

== Demographics ==
Poornankuppam has an average literacy rate of 81.49%, male literacy is 88.89%, and female literacy is 74.13%. In Poornankuppam, 10% of the population is under 6 years of age.

== Transport ==
Poornankuppam is located at 1.5 km from Thavalakuppam on Thavalakuppam - Pudukuppam Road. One can reach Thavalakuppam by any local bus from Pondicherry to Bahoor, Madukarai and Karaiyanputtur running via Ariyankuppam. From Thavalakuppam, you have to walk 1.5 km towards east to reach Poornankuppam. Poornankuppam can also be reached directly by less frequent PRTC Bus running between Pondicherry and Pudukuppam.

== Road network ==
Poornankuppam is connected to Pondicherry by Thavalakuppam - Pudukuppam Road.

== Tourism ==
=== Sri Anagalaparameshwari Amman Kovil ===
The shrine of Angalaparameshwari Amman is located in Poornankuppam, where the worship is for Angalamman, an incarnation of the Goddess, who draws pilgrims from Malaiyanoor and neighboring places.

== Arulmigu Drowpathy ==
Amman Kovil, Poornankuppam is famous for Fire Festival and sri Angalaparameshwariamman kovil for Mayana Kollai, and 27 feet hanuman statue is located here. Mayana kollai festival is celebrated for ten days. It starts at maha sivarathri every year, and the festival will lie on February or March. and more than two thousand years old Sivan Temple is located in this village (Sre Ellai Easwaran kovil)

=== Sri Olakur iyyannarappan kovil ===
This temple is situated in kamraj salai, poorankuppam and was built in 2003 by Asogane ramachandiran. Every year the festival will be held on English month july - (Tamil month Aadi) "first Monday", It is famous for the karavam festival followed by "Iyyanarapan Thirukalyanam" and swami oorvalam!

=== Sree Ellai Easwaran koil ===
Sree Ellai Easwaran koil is built newly (which was more than 2000 years old)

== Politics ==
Poornankuppam is part of Manavely (State Assembly Constituency) which comes under Pondicherry (Lok Sabha constituency)
