= Cuddalore–Ariyankuppam Bus Route =

Bus route in Tamil Nadu, India

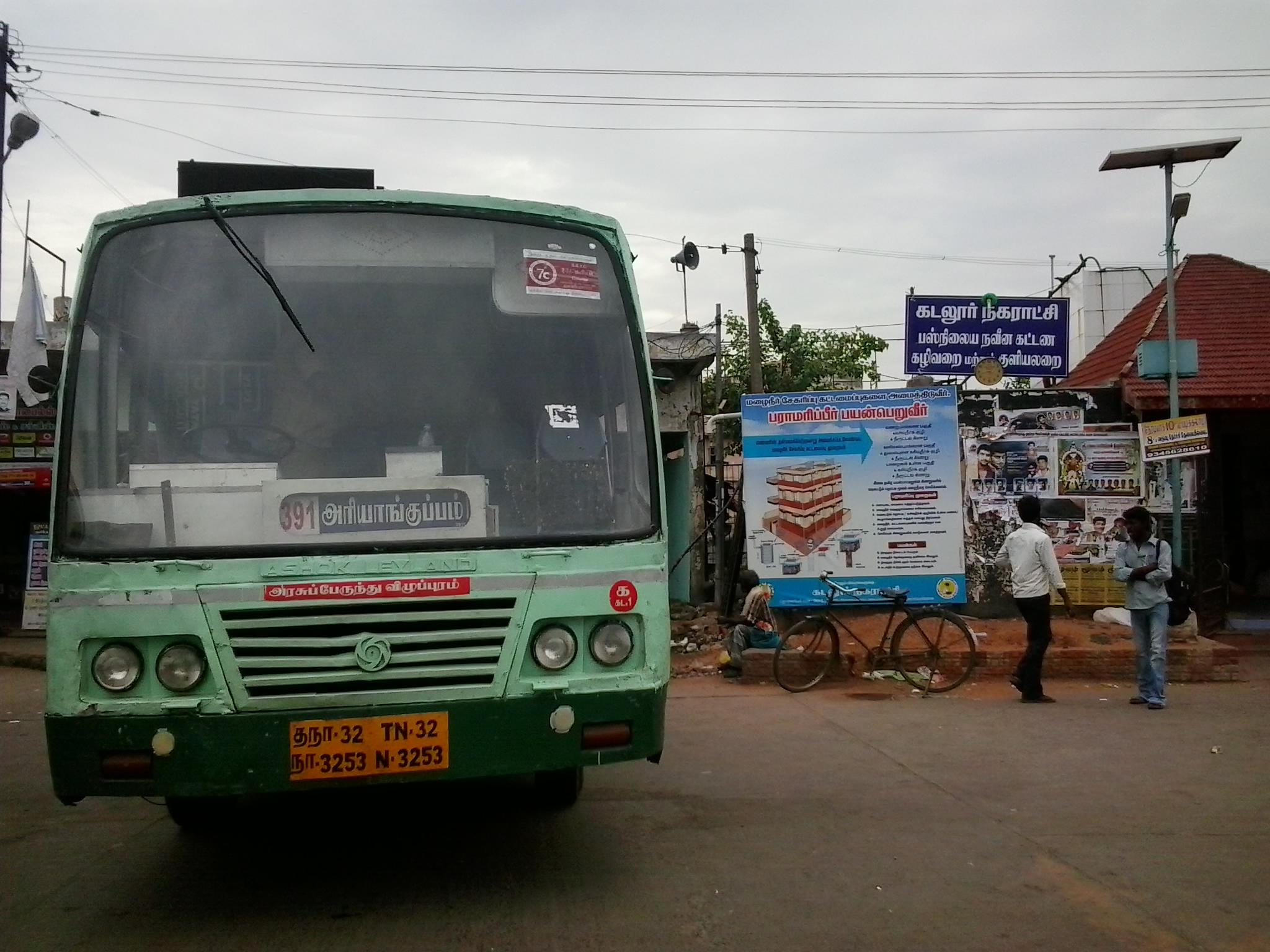
Route 391 Cuddalore-Ariyankuppam Bus standing at Cuddalore Bus Stand

Ariyankuppam is extensively connected with Cuddalore by the Pondicherry–Cuddalore Road Corridor. The frequency is 2 minute per bus. As this corridor is always over crowded, people of Ariyankuppam has to go Cuddalore by standing in these buses.

== Dedicated Bus Service ==
Earlier Tamil Nadu Government ply Bus Route No 26A from Cuddalore to Chinna Irusampalayam, a hamlet of Kilinjikuppam Panchayat Village, Cuddalore District. But due to very narrow road and with a lot of bends in Chinna Irusampalayam, it became difficult for the drivers to operate bus. This led to the reduction of Route 26A to Ariyankuppam. Thus Ariyankuppam got a dedicated Bus Service (Route No. 26A) from Cuddalore. Aged people and Ladies prefer this bus to Cuddalore instead of regular route bus from Pondicherry to Cuddalore.

== Route ==
Route No. 26A connects Ariyankuppam with Cuddalore via. Thavalakuppam, Reddichavadi, Kirumampakkam, Kanniyakoil and Manjakuppam which is the regular route for Pondicherry–Cuddalore Buses. Another bus, Route 391 also connects Ariyankuppam with Cuddalore. This bus runs alternatively between Cuddalore–Chidambaram and Cuddalore–Ariyankuppam route. It is an express bus and so it has individual seating arrangement.

== Fare ==
Route Number	Type	Fare (in ₹)
391	Express Bus	₹11
26A	Town Bus	₹7

== Timings ==
Route 26A - Cuddalore to Ariyankuppam

Starting Point	Destination	Timings
Cuddalore	Ariyankuppam	5:25 am, 9:25 am, 1:05 pm, 3:00 pm, 6:30 pm
Ariyankuppam	Cuddalore	6:10 am, 10:00 am, 2:15 pm, 3:45 pm, 7:20 pm

Route 391 - Cuddalore to Ariyankuppam

Starting Point	Destination	Timings
Cuddalore	Ariyankuppam	5:00 am, 8:30 am, 10:30 am, 3:45 pm
Ariyankuppam	Cuddalore	5:50 am, 9:25 am, 11:25 am, 4:30 pm

Note: Route 391 does not run on Sundays and on Full Moon and New Moon Days
