= Kakkayanthope =

- Out Growth
- Location in Puducherry, India Kakkayanthope (India)
- Coordinates: 11.895236°N 79.816467°E
- Country: India
- State: Puducherry
- District: Pondicherry
- Taluk: Puducherry
- Commune: Ariyankuppam

Languages
  - Official: Tamil
  - Additional: English, French
- Time zone: UTC+5:30 (IST)
- PIN: 605 007
- Telephone code: 0413
- Vehicle registration: PY-01
- Sex ratio: 50% ♂/♀

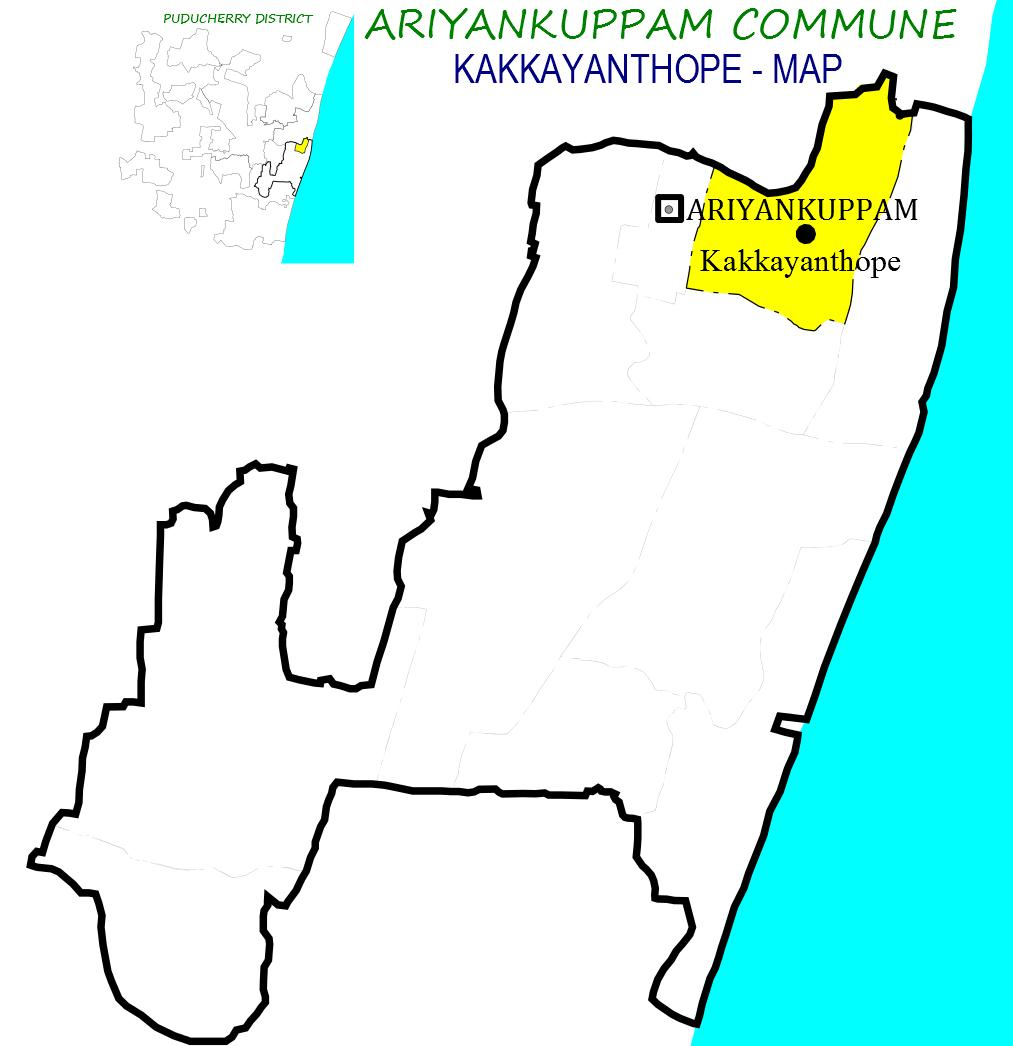
Kakkayanthope Village in Ariyankuppam Commune

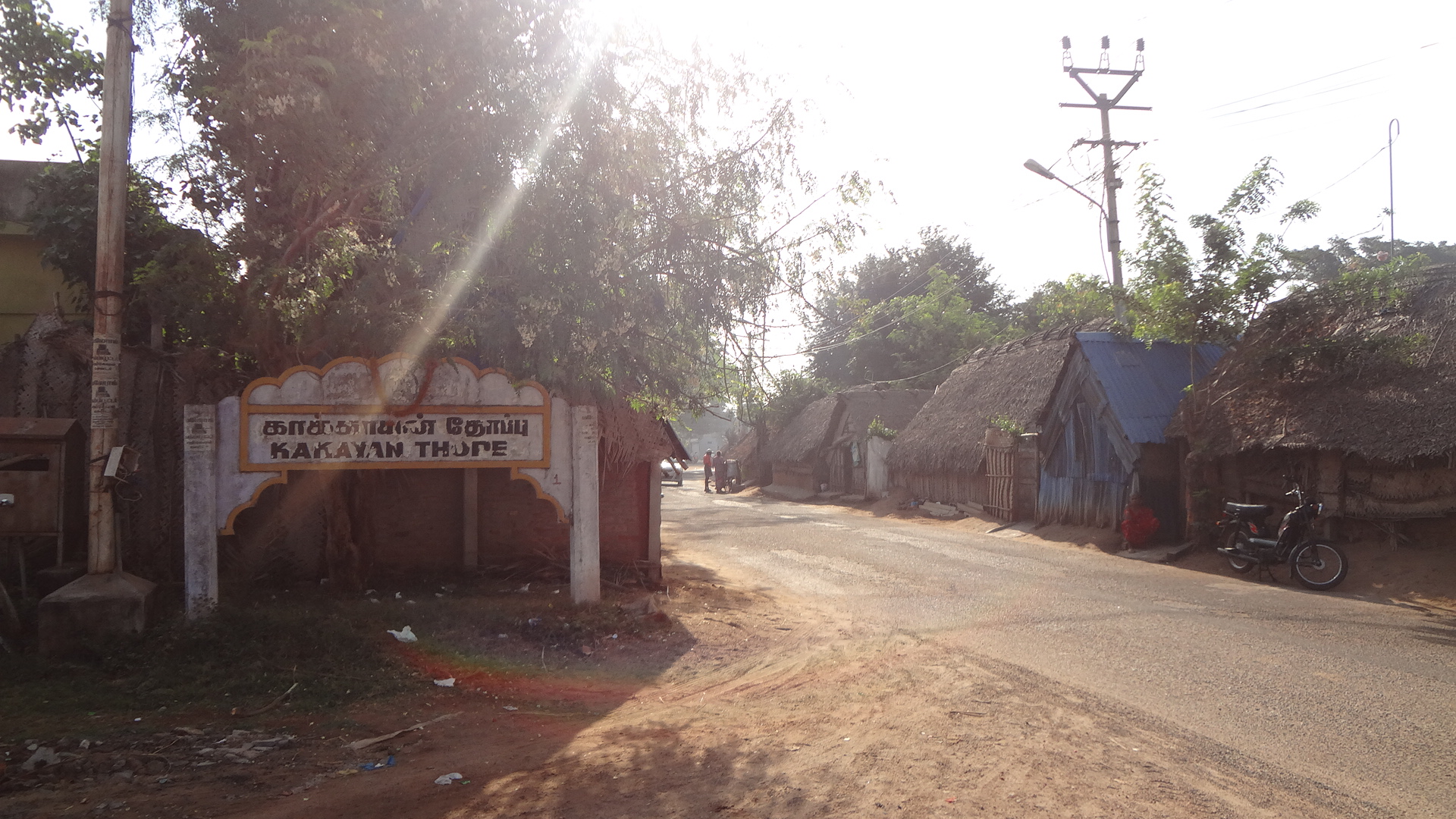
Kakkayanthope village on RC-26

Kakkayanthope is a village in Ariyankuppam Commune in the Union Territory of Puducherry, India.

== Geography ==
Kakkayanthope is bordered by Ariyankuppam River in the north, Veerampattinam in the east, Manavely in the south and Ariyankuppam in the West

== Demographics ==
Kakkayanthope has an average literacy rate of 81.49%, male literacy is 88.89%, and female literacy is 74.13%. In Kakkayanthope, 10% of the population is under 6 years of age.

== Transport ==
Kakkayanthope is located at 1.5 km from Ariyankuppam on Ariyankuppam - Veerampattinam Road. One can reach Kakkayanthope by any local bus from Pondicherry to Veerampattinam.

== Road Network ==
Kakkayanthope is connected to Pondicherry by Ariyankuppam–Veerampattinam Road.

== Tourism ==
=== Arikamedu Archaeological Excavation ===
Arikamedu is an archaeological site located at a distance of 1 km from Ariyankuppam, where Mortimer Wheeler conducted his best-known excavation in the 1940s. According to Wheeler, Arikamedu was a Tamil fishing village which was formerly a major port dedicated to bead making and trading with Roman traders. It flourished for centuries until the Romans left. Various Roman artifacts, such as a large number of amphorae bearing the mark of Roman potter schools VIBII, CAMURI and ITTA, have been found at the site, supporting the view on an ancient trade between Rome and the ancient Tamil country. An Archaeological Museum is also present.

=== Veerampattinam Temple Car Festival ===
Sri Sengazhuneer Amman Temple (செங்கழுநீர் அம்மன் கோவில்) at Veerampattinam is the abode of Sakti and is the oldest temple in Ariyankuppam. It is located at a distance of 2.5 km from Ariyankuppam. The goddess at the sanctum sanctorum faces the sea while the seven deities face the north. The temple also houses Lord Shiva, Ganapathy and Murugan.

A grand festival is celebrated every year for six continuous Fridays starting from the Tamil month of Aadi. Special importance is given to the fifth Friday of the six Fridays and this day is declared as public holiday by the Government of Puducherry. On this day, thousands of prigrims throng this holy place to celebrate the festival.

Right from the days of the French, it was a custom to invite the Lt. Governor of Puducherry to start the Temple car procession by pulling its long rope.

== Politics ==
Kakkayanthope is a part of Ariyankuppam (State Assembly Constituency) which comes under Puducherry (Lok Sabha constituency)
