= Thimmanayakanpalayam =

Thimmanayakanpalayam Timanaïkpaléom
- Village
- Location in Puducherry, India Thimmanayakanpalayam (India)
- Coordinates: 11.843197°N 79.769258°E
- Country: India
- State: Puducherry
- District: Pondicherry
- Taluk: Puducherry
- Commune: Ariyankuppam

Languages
  - Official: Tamil
  - Additional: English, French
- Time zone: UTC+5:30 (IST)
- PIN: 605 007
- Telephone code: 0413
- Vehicle registration: PY-01
- Sex ratio: 50% ♂/♀

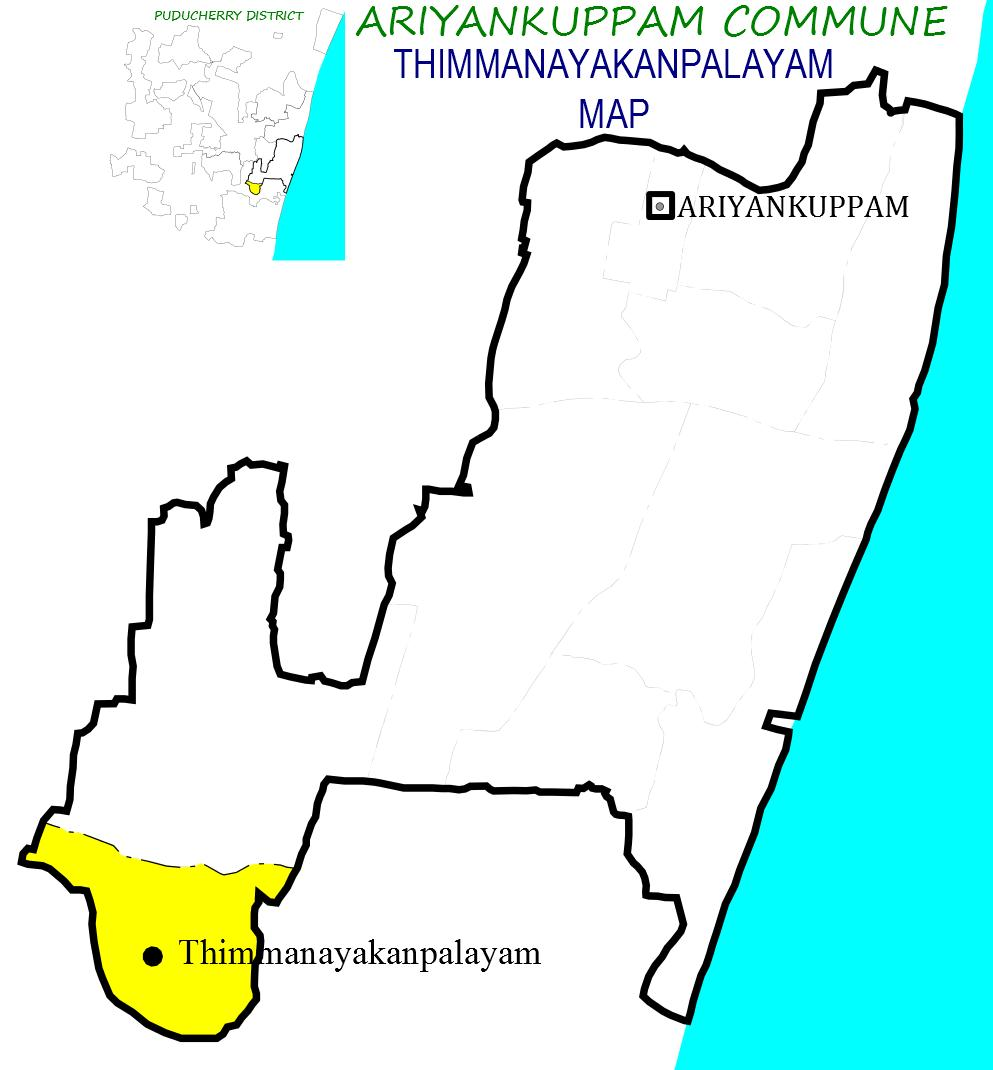
Thimmanayakanpalayam Village in Ariyankuppam Commune

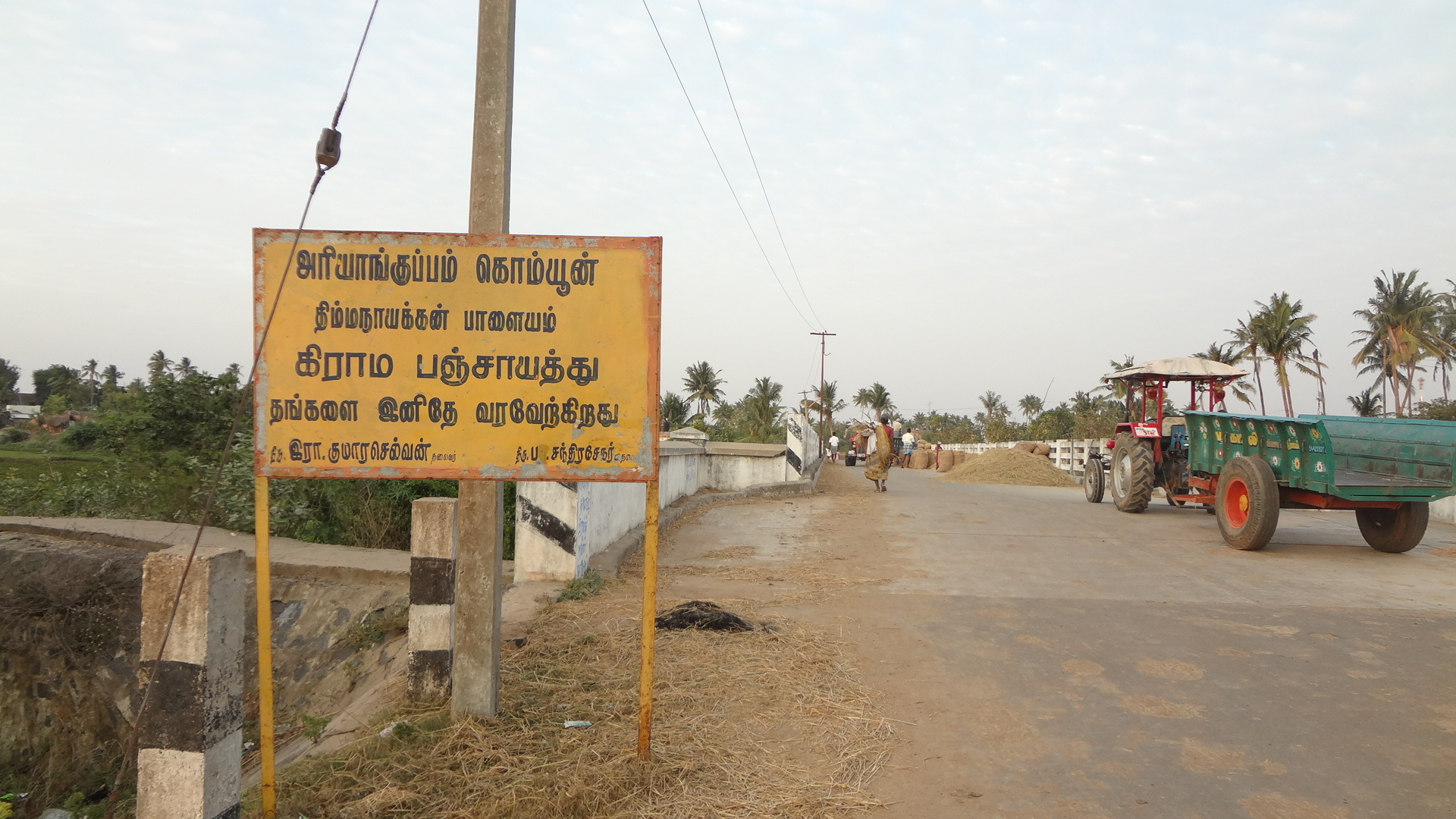
Thimmanayakanpalayam entry from Mel Azhingipattu

Thimmanayakanpalayam also known as T.N. Palayam is a panchayat village in Ariyankuppam Commune in the Union Territory of Puducherry. It is also a revenue village under Ariyankuppam Firka

== Geography ==
Thimmanayakanpalayam is bordered by Abishegapakkam in the north, rest of all directions is bordered by Malaattar River.

== Demographics ==
Thimmanayakanpalayam has an average literacy rate of 81.49%, male literacy is 88.89%, and female literacy is 74.13%. In Thimmanayakanpalayam, 10% of the population is under 6 years of age.

== Transport ==
Thimmanayakanpalayam is located at 3.1 km from Abishegapakkam on Abishegapakkam - TN Palayam Road. Abishegapakkam can be reached by any bus between Pondicherry and Bahoor, Madukarai and Karaiyanputtur running via Ariyankuppam. From Abishegapakkam, one has to walk 3.1 km to reach Thimmanayakanpalayam. Thimmanayakanpalayam can also be reached directly by PRTC Bus (Route No. 5A) running between Pondicherry and Thimmanayakanpalayam but the frequency is very less.

== Road Network ==
Thimmanayakanpalayam is connected to Pondicherry by RC-20 State Highway and in turn by Abishegapakkam–Thimmanayakanpalayam Road. There is another road from TN Palayam to Bahour via Mel Azhingipattu and Seliamedu

== Tourism ==
=== Singirikudi Lakshminarashimhar Koil ===
Singirikudi Lakshminarashimhar Koil is located at 3.3 km from Thimmanayakanpalayam. Singirikudi is famous for the Ugira Narashimhar.

=== Rural Tourism ===
TN palayam village is declared for rural tourism in Puducherry. The other village considered for rural tourism is Alangkuppam village

== Politics ==
Thimmanayakanpalayam is a part of Manavely (State Assembly Constituency) which comes under Puducherry (Lok Sabha constituency)
