= Manavely =

Manavely Manaveli
- Census Town
- Location in Puducherry, India Manavely (India)
- Coordinates: 11.889564°N 79.80964°E
- Country: India
- State: Puducherry
- District: Pondicherry
- Taluk: Puducherry
- Commune: Ariyankuppam

Languages
  - Official: Tamil
  - Additional: English, French
- Time zone: UTC+5:30 (IST)
- PIN: 605 007
- Telephone code: 0413
- Vehicle registration: PY-01
- Sex ratio: 50% ♂/♀

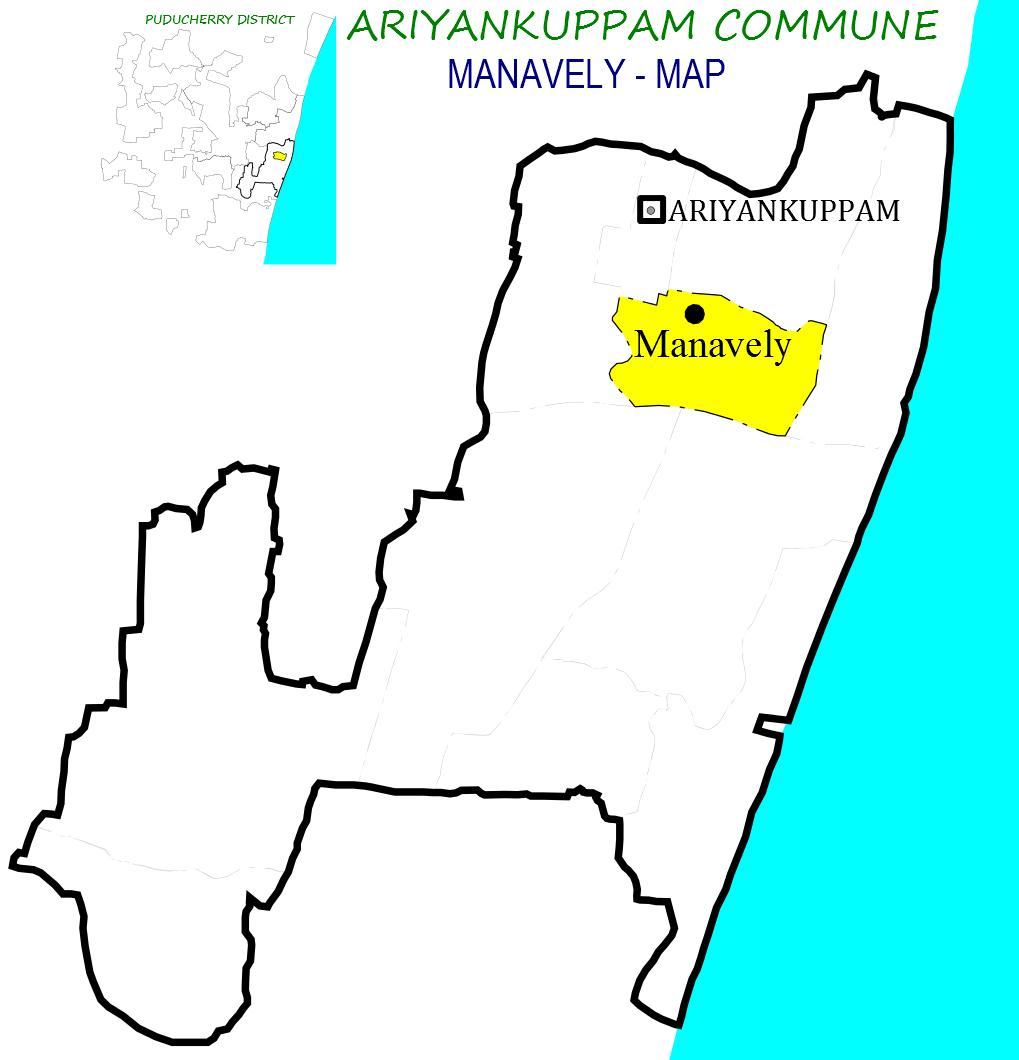
Manavely Village in Ariyankuppam Commune

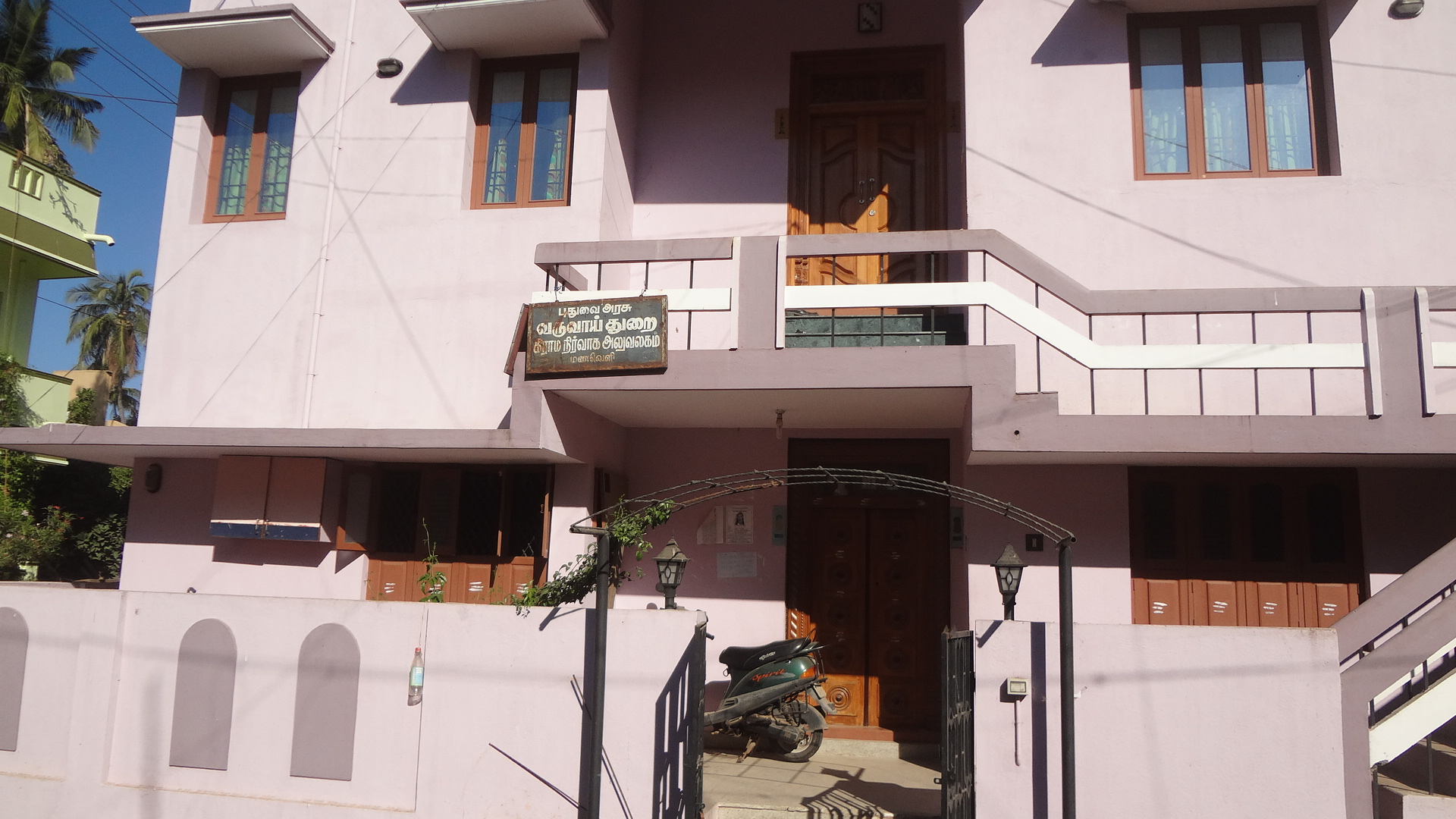
Manavely Village Administrative Office

Manavely is a Census Town in Ariyankuppam Commune in the Union Territory of Puducherry, India.

== Geography ==
Manavely is bordered by Kakkayanthope in the north, Veerampattinam in the east, Sankaraparani River in the south and Ariyankuppam (West) in the West

== Demographics ==
Manavely has an average literacy rate of 81.49%, male literacy is 88.89%, and female literacy is 74.13%. In Manavely, 10% of the population is under 6 years of age.

== Transport ==
Manavely is located at 1.5 km from Ariyankuppam on Ariyankuppam - Chinna Veerapatinam Road. One can reach Ariyankuppam by any local bus from Pondicherry to Bahoor, Madukarai and Karaiyanputtur running via Ariyankuppam. From Ariyankuppam, you have to walk 1.5 km towards east to reach Manavely. Manavely can also be reached directly by PRTC Bus (Route No. 2A) running between Pondicherry and Chinna Veerampatinam.

== Road Network ==
Manavely is connected to Pondicherry by Ariyankuppam–Chinna Veerampatinam Road. There is another road from Manavely to NH-45A namely Manavely Main Road. It starts from NH-45A near Ariyankuppam Police Station.

== Tourism ==
=== Chinna Veerampatinam Beach ===
Chinna Veerampatinam Beach is located at a distance of 1.5 km from Manavely. The Windflower Resort & Spa is located in Chinna Veerampatinam. Sankaraparani River joins the Bay of Bengal at Chinna Veerampatinam.

== Politics ==
After Delimitation, Manavely become a State Assembly Constituency which comes under Puducherry (Lok Sabha constituency).
