= Ariyankuppam (West) =

- Out Growth
- Location in Puducherry, India Ariyankuppam (West) (India)
- Coordinates: 11.887961°N 79.800803°E
- Country: India
- State: Puducherry
- District: Pondicherry
- Taluk: Puducherry
- Commune: Ariyankuppam

Languages
  - Official: Tamil
  - Additional: English, French
- Time zone: UTC+5:30 (IST)
- PIN: 605 007
- Telephone code: 0413
- Vehicle registration: PY-01
- Sex ratio: 50% ♂/♀

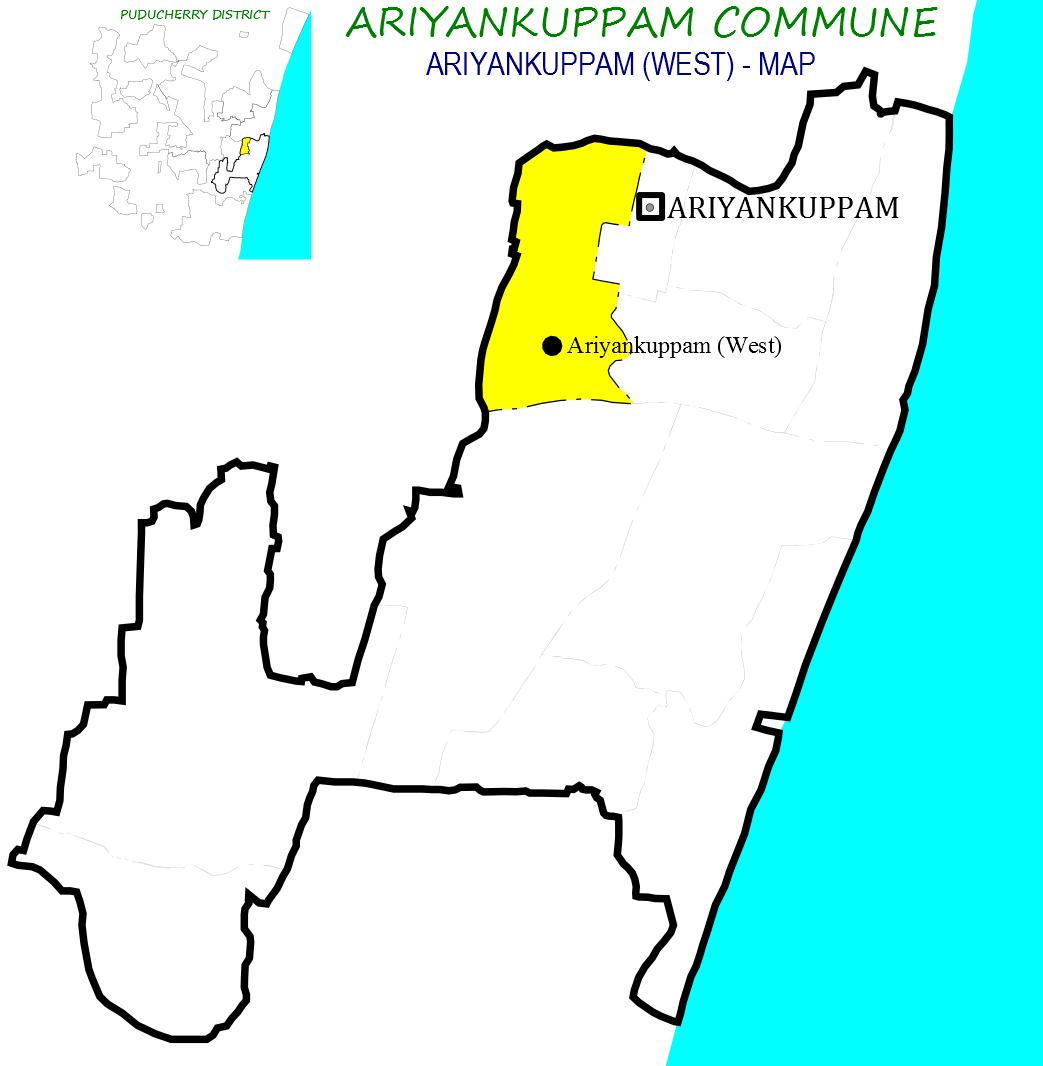
Ariyankuppam (West) Village in Ariyankuppam Commune

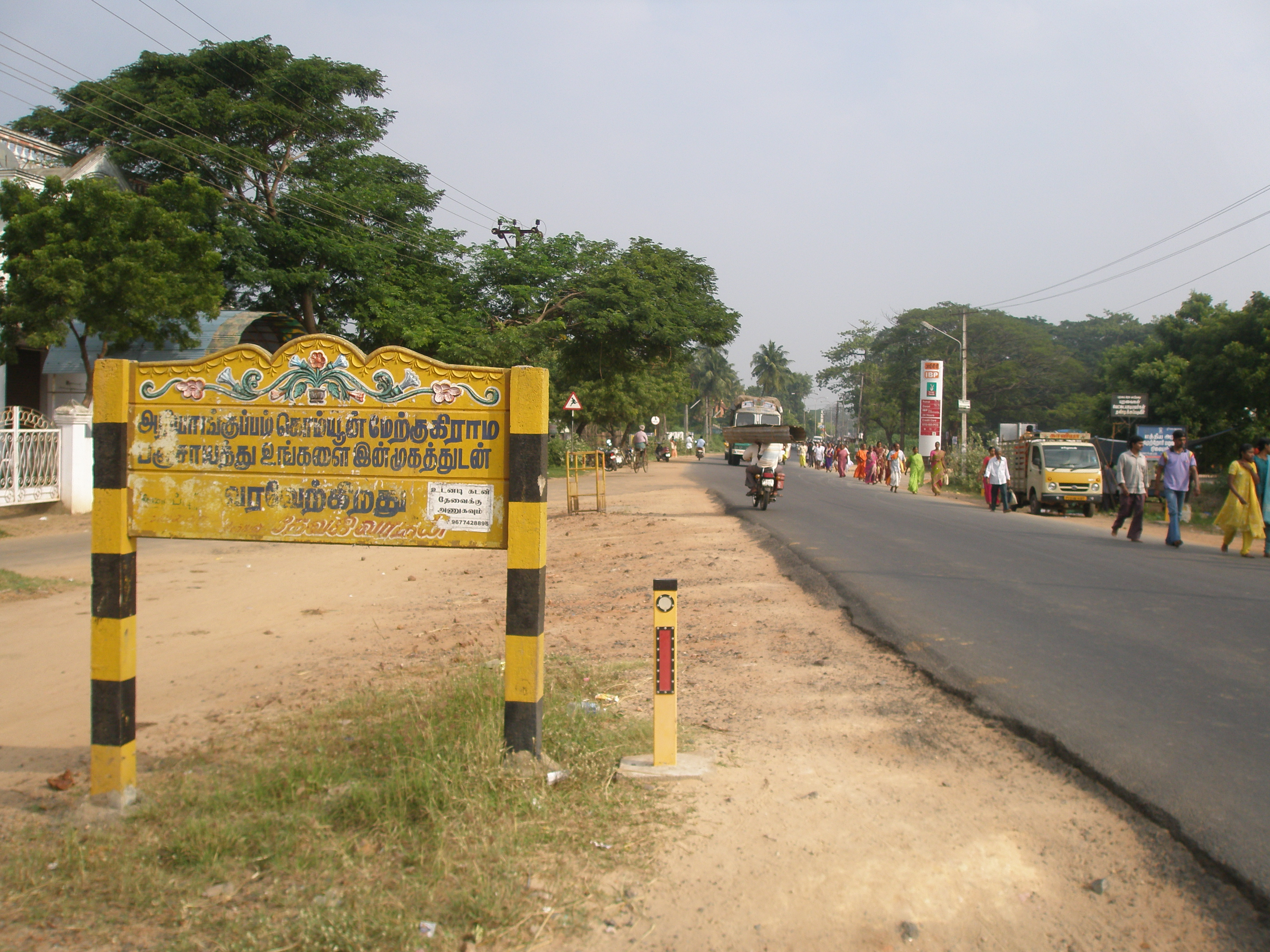
Ariyankuppam (West)

Ariyankuppam (West) is a panchayat village in Ariyankuppam Commune in the Union Territory of Puducherry, India.

== Geography ==
Ariyankuppam (West) is bordered by Ariyankuppam River in the north, Ariyankuppam in the east, Sankaraparani River in the south and Chinna Irusampalayam (Tamil Nadu) in the West. The portion of Ariyankuppam located west of NH-45A and Tollgate comes under Ariyankuppam (West) Village Panchayat.

== Demographics ==
Ariyankuppam (West) has an average literacy rate of 81.49%, male literacy is 88.89%, and female literacy is 74.13%. In Ariyankuppam (West), 10% of the population is under 6 years of age.

== Villages ==
Following are the villages under Ariyankuppam (West) Village Panchayat.

- Arunthathipuram
- Tollgate
- Nonankuppam

== Tourism ==
=== Chunnambar Boat House ===
Chunnambar Boat House (Tamil: சுன்னாம்பாறு படகு துறை) is located in Ariyankuppam. It is one of the major tourist spot in Puducherry and it can be reached at a distance of 7 km from Puducherry. The boat house needs to be renamed either Ariyankuppam Boat House or Sankaraparani Boat House as it is located in Sankaraparani river bank at Ariyankuppam. Chunnambar is a name given to Sankaraparani river. The boat house comes under Ariyankuppam (West) village of Ariyankuppam Commune.

=== PachaiVazhiAmman Kovil ===
Arulmigu PachaiVazhiAmman sametha Mannathaswamy Kovil11.884633°N 79.801388°E is an ancient temple of Ariyankuppam dating to the 17th century. It is located between Ariyankuppam and Chunnambar Boat House at a distance of 1.2 km from Ariyankuppam. The presiding deity is Goddess Pachaivazhiamman (Tamil: பச்சைவாழி அம்மன்)

== Politics ==
Ariyankuppam (West) up to Ariyankuppam Police Station is a part of Ariyankuppam (State Assembly Constituency), Whereas Nonakuppam and Tollgate comes under Manavely (State Assembly Constituency) which is under Puducherry (Lok Sabha constituency)

== Gallery ==
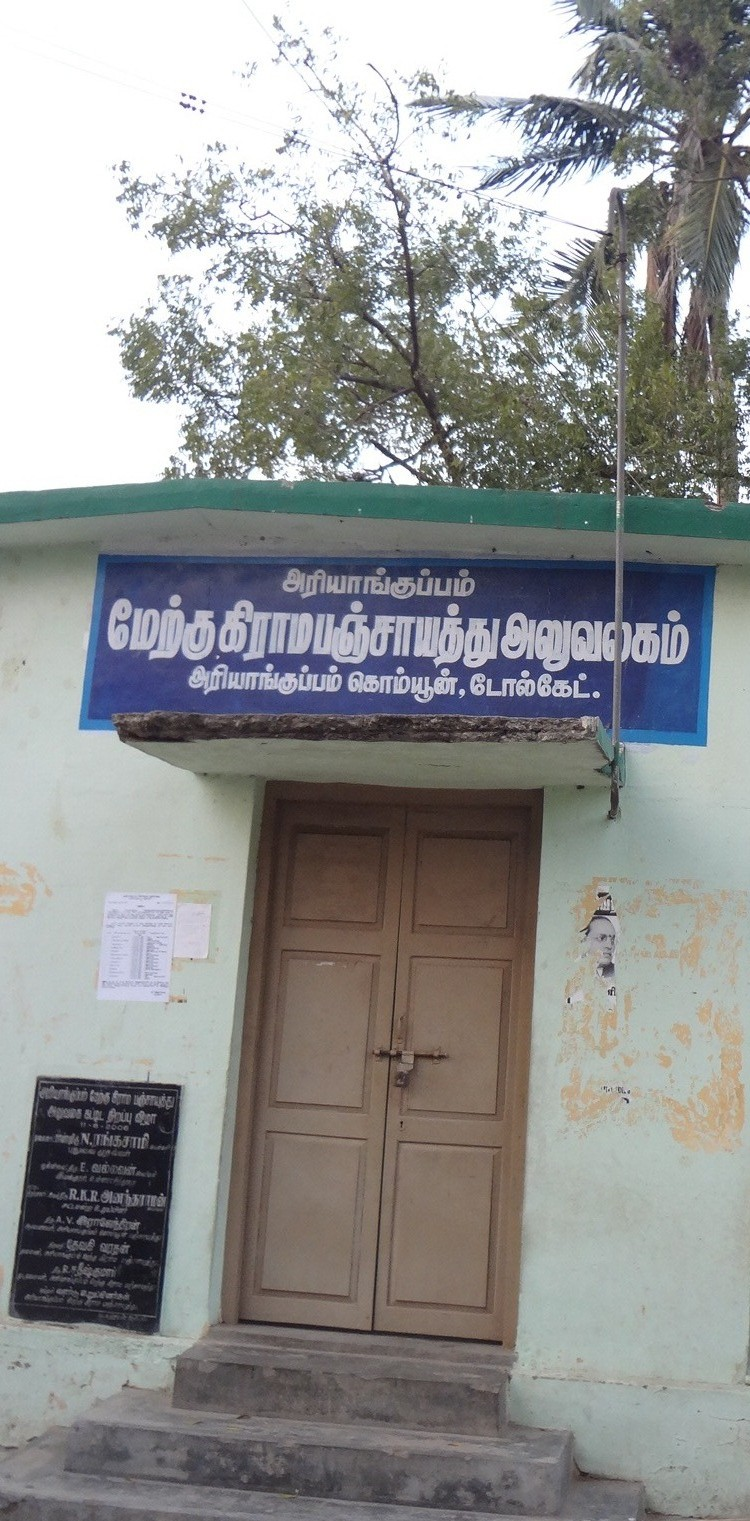
Ariyankuppam (West) Village Panchayat Office
