= A. M. Krishnamurthy =

Indian politician (1957/1958–2024)

A. M. Krishnamurthy (1957/1958 – 14 April 2024) was an Indian politician who was member of the Bharatiya Janata Party until he joined All India Anna Dravida Munnetra Kazhagam in 2006. Krishnamurthy was a member of the Puducherry Legislative Assembly from the Reddiarpalayam constituency in Ozhukarai taluk, Puducherry district from 2001 to 2006. He was first elected MLA of Bharatiya Janata Party in Puducherry Legislative Assembly. Krishnamurthy died on 14 April 2024, aged 66.
