= Thavalakuppam =

Thavalakuppam Tavalacoupom
- Village
- Location in Puducherry, India Thavalakuppam (India)
- Coordinates: 11.8673929°N 79.7939157°E
- Country: India
- State: Puducherry
- District: Pondicherry
- Taluk: Puducherry
- Commune: Ariyankuppam

Population (2001)
  - Total: 5,670

Languages
  - Official: Tamil
  - Additional: English, French
- Time zone: UTC+5:30 (IST)
- PIN: 605 007
- Telephone code: 0413
- ISO 3166 code: IN-PY
- Vehicle registration: PY-01
- Sex ratio: 50% ♂/♀

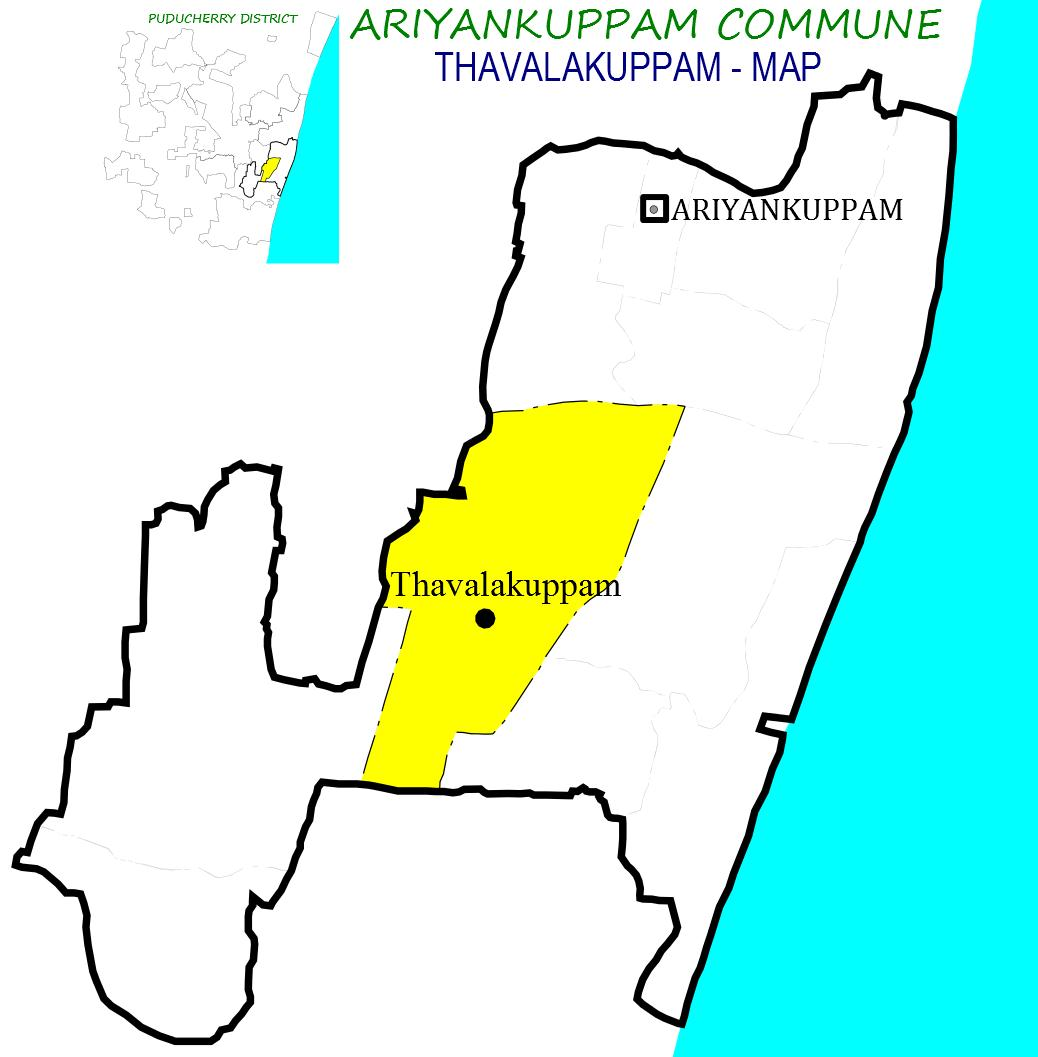
Thavalakuppam Village in Ariyankuppam Commune

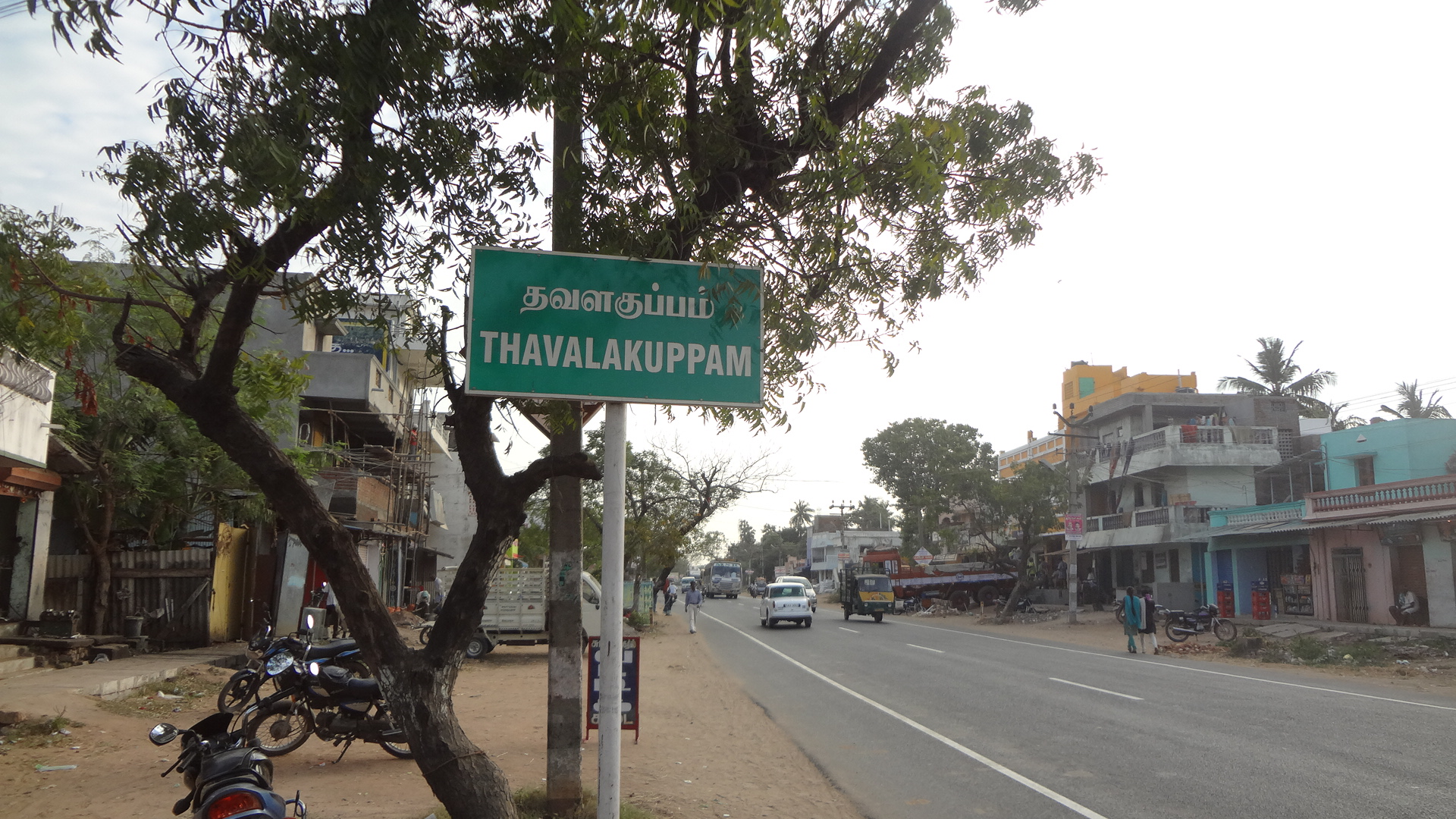
Thavalakuppam

Thavalakuppam is a panchayat village in Ariyankuppam Commune in the Union Territory of Puducherry, India. It is also a revenue village under Ariyankuppam Firka.

== Geography ==
Thavalakuppam is bordered by Sankaraparani River in the north, Pooranankuppam in the east, periyakattupalayam(Tamil Nadu) in the south and Abishegapakkam in the West

== Demographics ==
As of 2001 India census, Thavalakuppam had a population of 5670. Males constitute 50% of the population and females 50%. Thavalakuppam has an average literacy rate of 81.49%, male literacy is 88.89%, and female literacy is 74.13%. In Thavalakuppam, 10% of the population is under 6 years of age.

== Transport ==
Thavalakuppam is located at 11° 52′N 79° 47′E. Thavalakuppam is at 7.5 km from Pondicherry city and 3.5 km from Ariyankuppam. It is in between Pondicherry and Cuddalore on NH-45A. One can reach Thavalakuppam by any local bus from Pondicherry to Bahoor, Madukarai and Karaiyanputtur running via Ariyankuppam.

== Road Network ==
The following are main roads in Thavalakuppam

- National Highway - 45A
- Thavalakuppam - Embalam Highway (RC-20)
- Pudukuppam Road
- Nallavadu Road

== Tourism ==
=== Singirikudi Lakshminarashimhar Koil ===
Singirikudi Lakshminarashimhar Koil is located atAbishegapakkam,2 km from Thavalakuppam on Thavalakuppam - Embalam Highway (RC-20). Singirikudi is famous for the Ugira Narashimhar. The presiding deity is approximately eight feet tall. Here Lord Narasimha swamy appears in the posture of killing Hiranya Kasibu. The Presiding deity has 8+8 = 16 hands. Here the pooja is conducted according to Vaikhanasa agamam. The exact date of construction of this temple is not known.

Jalakandeswarar Temple
Jalakandeswarar temple is residing at Edayarplayam village. This temple has a Shiva lingam. It is nearly 5 feet height. The name of the temple came due to its neighborly pond(Jalam kanda Eeswarar). For all Pradosham the people will gather here to worship. On the olden days the Shiva lingam is located under the neem tree. Then people established a temple. During the time of construction of the temple two ruthratcham chain found, under the ground. Now they were put on to the shiva lingam.

== Villages under Thavalakuppam Village Panchayat ==
- Thavalakuppam
- Edayarpalayam
- Nanamedu

== Politics ==
Thavakuppam is part of Manavely (State Assembly Constituency) which comes under Pondicherry (Lok Sabha constituency)

== Education ==
- Rajiv Gandhi Arts and Science College
