= Uzhavarkarai taluk =

Human settlement in India

Coordinates: 11°55′52.36″N 79°48′8.7″E

Uzhavarkarai or Ozhukarai taluk (Tamil: [uɻɐʋɐɾhɐɾɐi̯, oɻuhɐɾɐi̯]) is one of four taluks in the Pondicherry District of the union territory of Puducherry. Uzhavarkarai taluk has only one sub-taluk/firka, viz. Uzhavarkarai. It consists of 8 revenue villages.

== Revenue villages ==
There are 8 revenue villages under Uzhavarkarai taluk, viz.

- Alankuppam
- Kalapet
- Karuvadikuppam
- Oulgaret
- Pillaisavady
- Reddiarpalayam
- Saram
- Thatanchavady

All these revenue villages come under urban area, which is administered by Uzhavarkarai municipality, which is divided into 37 municipal wards.
