= Pudukkadi =

Village in Tamil Nadu, India

Pudukkadai is a village located in Cuddalore Taluka of Cuddalore district of Tamil Nadu state, it is located 14 km from headquarters Cuddalore and 168 km from State capital Chennai. The nearby cities are Pondicherry, Cuddalore, Vadalur and Nellikuppam.

== Demographics ==
Tamil is the local language spoken in this village, there are 464 families residing in this village with an average population of 1892 out of which 951 are male and 941 are female.

== Administration ==
Pudukkadai is administered by the Sarpanch who is the head of the village and he is the elected representative of village.

== Commute ==
This place could be reached via train or bus, and the nearest railway station are the Villianur railway station and the Chinna Babu Samudram railway station.The nearest bus stops are Pudukadai Alamaram Bus Stop, Pudukadai Bus Stop, Perungalur Bus Stop and Theduvar Natham Bus Stop.
