= Uzhavarkarai =

Uzhavarkarai Oulgaret
- city
- Location in Puducherry, India Uzhavarkarai (India)
- Coordinates: 11.9264874°N 79.7789162°E
- Country: India
- State: Puducherry
- District: Pondicherry

Government
  - Type: Municipality
  - Body: Oulgaret Municipality உழவர்கரை நகராட்சி Municipalité d'Oulgaret
  - Municipal Chairman: No elections conducted after 2011

Area
  - Total: 36.7 km^{2} (14.2 sq mi)
- Elevation: 3 m (9.8 ft)

Population (2011)
  - Total: 300,104
  - Density: 8,180/km^{2} (21,200/sq mi)

Languages
  - Official: Tamil
  - Additional: English, French
- Time zone: UTC+5:30 (IST)
- PIN: 605010
- ISO 3166 code: IN-PY
- Vehicle registration: PY-05
- Website: http://oulmun.in

Uzhavarkarai (Tamil: [uɻɐʋɐɾhɐɾɐi̯]) is a city, a municipality and a taluk in Puducherry district in the union territory of Puducherry. The enclaves of Kalapet and Alankuppam are parts of Uzhavarkarai municipality. Uzhavarkarai is also the only sub-taluk (firka) in Uzhavarkarai Taluk of Pondicherry district.

== Demographics ==
As of 2011 India census, Uzhavarkarai had a population of 300,104. Males constitute 49.48% of the population and females 50.52%. Uzhavarkarai has an average literacy rate of 77%, higher than the national average of 59.5%: male literacy is 83%, and female literacy is 71%. In Uzhavarkarai, 11% of the population is under 6 years of age.
