= Manjakuppam =

- city
- Location in Tamil Nadu, India Manjakuppam (India)
- Coordinates: 11.756°N 79.763°E
- Country: India
- State: Tamil Nadu
- District: Cuddalore
- Taluk: Cuddalore

Languages
  - Official: Tamil
- Time zone: UTC+5:30 (IST)
- Postal code: 604303
- Vehicle registration: TN-32

Manjakuppam is one of the three large divisions in the town of Cuddalore, India. The Ponnaiyar River flows through the town, the area adjacent to the banks of the river is named as Manjakuppam. It was known as Manja Cupam during the 17th century. During the recent years the place is being called as Manjainagar though officially it is still known as Manjakuppam.

Manjakuppam is in the heart of the town of Cuddalore, most of the important Government offices, Schools and Hospitals are located in Manjakuppam

Manjakuppam is a place of historic importance, Madras Gazetters South Arcot published in 1906 notes that " In 1680, they (the Dutch) returned...they were in possession of the Devanampatam fort and had a lease of Manjakuppam at the time that the English bought Fort St. David in 1690..."
