= Chinna Irusampalayam =

- Country: India
- State: Tamil Nadu

Languages
  - Official: Tamil
- Time zone: UTC+5:30 (IST)

Chinna Irusampalayam is a small village near Ariyankuppam in the Cuddalore district of the Tamil Nadu state of India. This village mainly depends on agriculture & cattle products. This village has only three streets namely Mudhal Theru (First Street), Nadu Theru (Middle Street) & Kadasi Theru (Last Street). This village has an Amman (Goddess) Temple.

This village can be reached by bus service to Ariyankuppam and from there by walk of 1.5 km. The road to reach this place is a zig zag one exactly resembling the crawling of a Snake. The roads are guarded by Paddy field and coconut fields.

This village is very near to the river Thiru Kanchi Aaaru, where the funeral services are performed every year for the deserted people. This hamlet is a part of Kilinjikuppam Panchayat Village under Cuddalore Block in Cuddalore District.
