= Mayana Kollai =

Indian festival

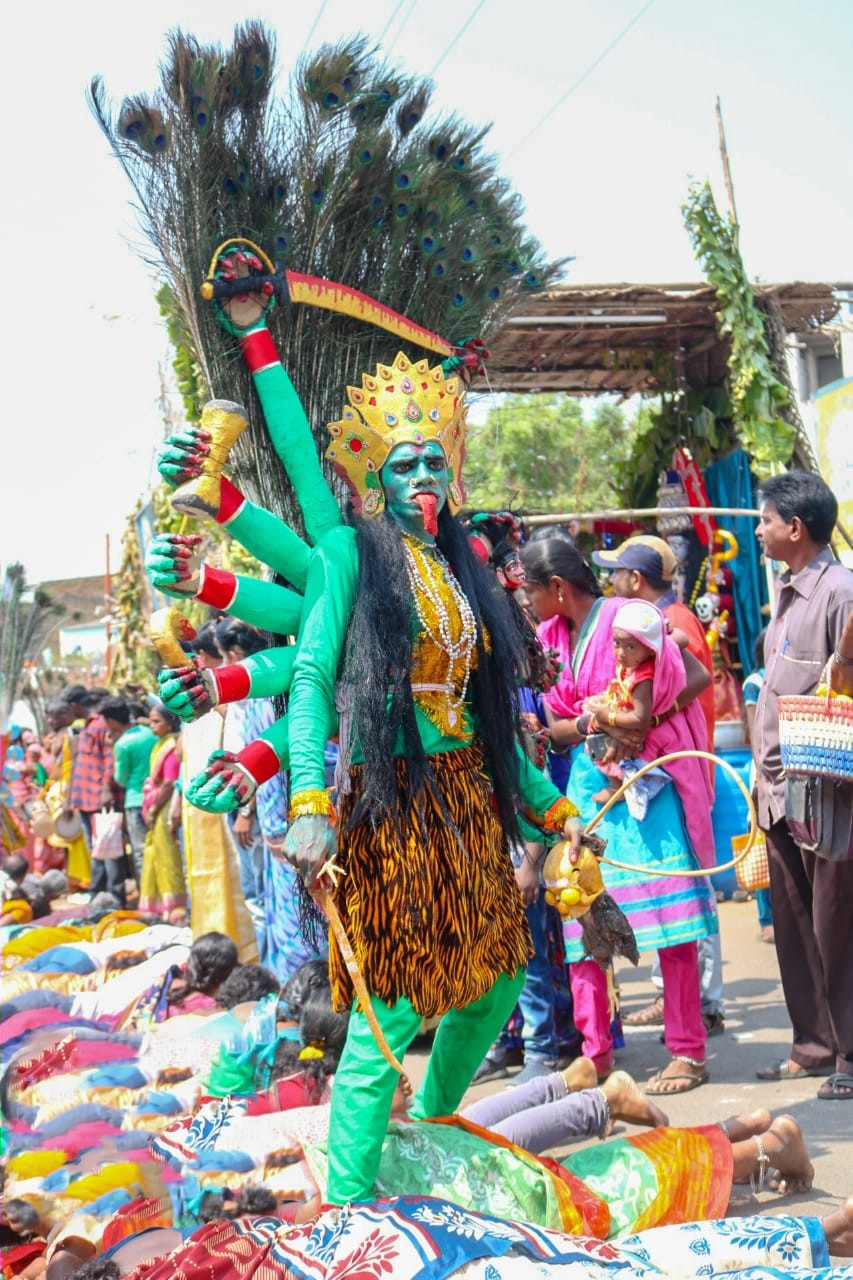
- Goddess Kali disguise at the Mayana Kollai festival
- Observed by: Dravidian folk religion Shaktism; Hindus
- Date: Decided by the Hindu calendar
- Frequency: Annual

Mayana Kollai is a festival celebrated on the first full moon day of February or March or April at all the Angala Parameswari temples in Tamil Nadu, India, after the holiday of after Maha Shivaratri. It celebrates the goddess Angala Parameswari Amman, a manifestation of Parvati, in her form as the goddess Mahakali.

== Mythological background ==
The festival commemorates the story of when Parvati, in her manifestation as Angala Devi, saved her husband Shiva from peril through her wit and power.

Beset by demons Sunda and Upasunda who got killed by her, Tilottama, a goddess of divine beauty, sought refuge in the Kailasha, to which the creator god Brahma followed her. Brahma, like Parvati's husband Shiva the destroyer god, had five heads and therefore Parvati mistook him for her husband and fell at his feet in an act of submission. Angered by this act of betrayal, Shiva took the form of the god Rudra and beheaded the fifth head of Brahma, invoking a curse upon himself – the head became attached to Shiva's right hand and consumed all the available food, leaving Shiva himself with none. He therefore became a mendicant and roamed the earth begging for food, sleeping in graveyards.

Parvathi pleaded with her brother like god, the protector god Vishnu, for a solution. He came up with the idea to trick Brahma's head: Parvati and Shiva would to go to a graveyard, make a pond there, prepare food from hummingbird tree leaves and chicken meats and bloods, and serve that food to the head attached to Shiva. The head would then detach from Shiva's hand to eat the food. Thus Parvati freed Shiva from the head, and purified him in the pond, after which the head could not approach Shiva in his purified state. However, the head then attached itself to Parvati. Through a sacred cosmic dance, Parvati amassed sufficient power to destroy the head by crushing it with her right foot to ashes and fusing it with Brahma. In this fierce form, Parvati is known as Angara Ruba Amman and Angala Amman, from which the Melmalayanur Angala Devi temple at which the festival mainly occurs takes its name.

== Practice ==
The holiday is a festival of Tamil origin, said to pre-date Vedic religion, which is called Dravidian folk religion. The central activity of the festival is a puja at the temple, followed by a procession, where an idol of Parvathi is carried to a graveyard or crematorium. An idol of Pavadairayan, a Dravidian hero of legend, follows that of Parvathi. The procession concludes at the crematorium, where sacrifices including cooked foods and animals such as chickens and lambs are presented to the deities.

Local artists also craft effigies or figurines of deities from dry grass, paper, and paint. They are carried by devotees in the procession. This is a spiritual practice for many of the sculptors, who adhere to strict vegetarian diets while engaged in this work.

Due to the large events, security is generally deployed to manage crowds at Mayana Kollai observances.
