= Ariyankuppam commune =

Human settlement in India

Coordinates: 11°53′49.16″N 79°48′18.56″E

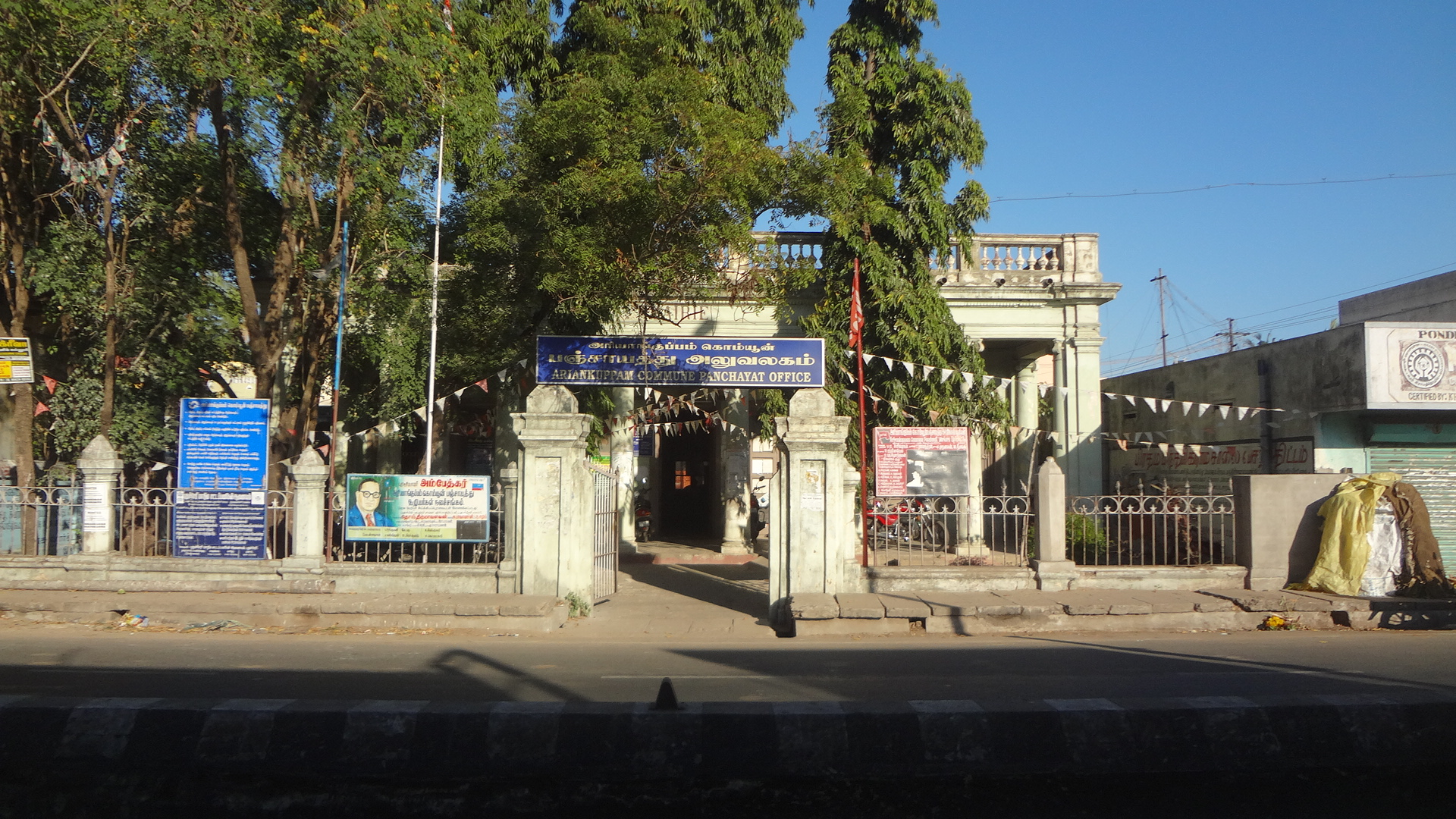
Ariyankuppam Commune Panchayat Office

Ariyankuppam is one of 5 Communes in Pondicherry district in the Indian territory of Puducherry. It is the only commune under Puducherry Taluk. Other communes are under Villianur and Bahour Taluk. Ariyankuppam Commune consists of 2 Census Town and 9 Panchayat Villages.

Ariyankuppam holds two vital tourist spots of Puducherry namely:

- Aricamedu, An Archaeological Site
- Chunnambar Boat House

== Commune wards ==
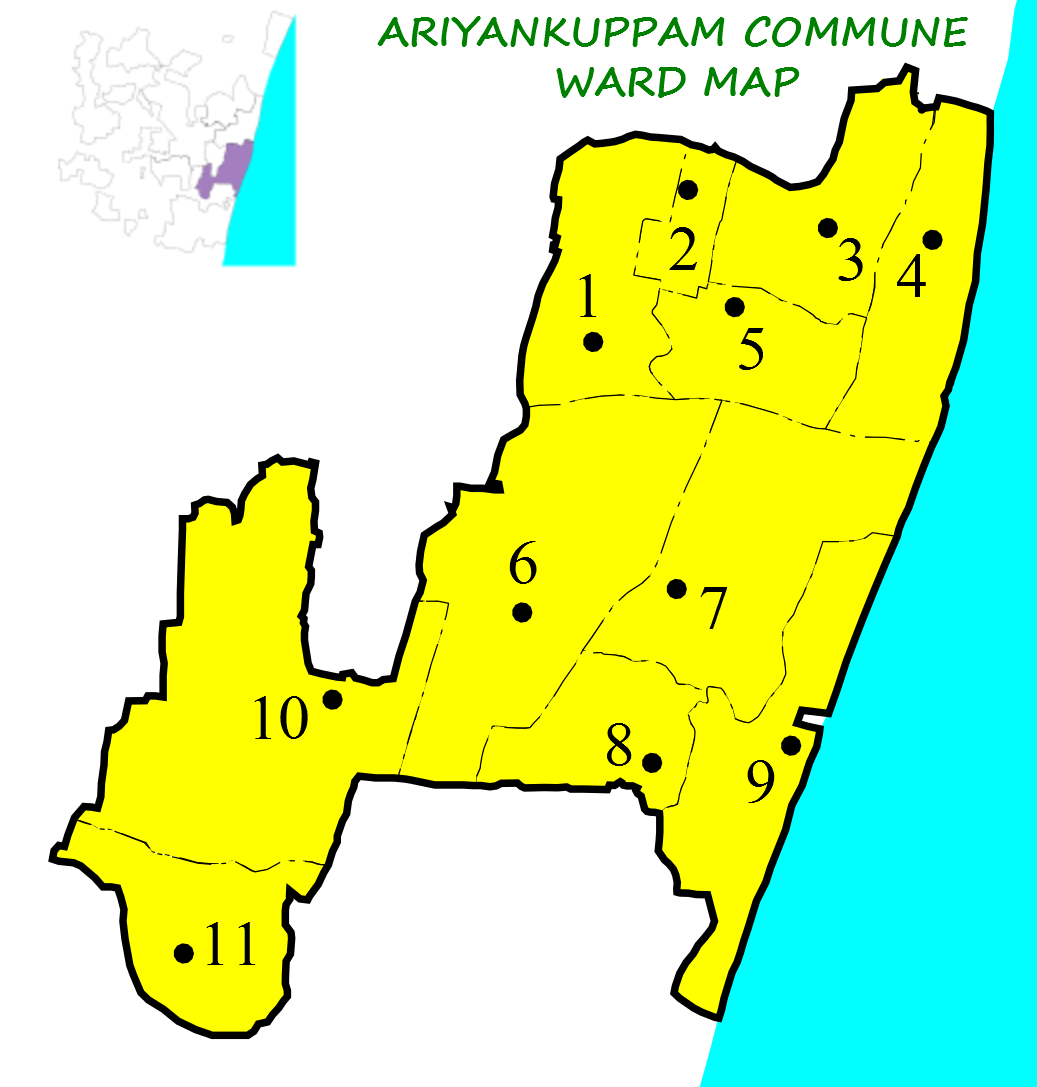

Ward Number	Ward Name	Town/Village	Area (km^{2})	Population (2011 Census)	Jurisdiction	Ward Map
1	Ariyankuppam (West)	Village			Arunthathipuram, Tollgate, Nonankuppam	
2	Ariyankuppam	Town			Ariyankuppam	
3	Kakkayanthope	Village			Kakkayanthope, Manjalai, Gaffour Nagar	
4	Veerampattinam	Village			Periya Veerampattinam, Chinna Veerampattinam	
5	Manavely	Town			Manavely, Odavely	
6	Thavalakuppam	Village			Thavalakuppam, Edayarpalayam, Nanamedu	
7	Pooranankuppam	Village			Pooranankuppam	
8	Nallavadu	Village			Nallavadu, Pudukuppam	
9	Andiyarpalayam	Village			Andiyarpalayam, Kasanthittu, Korukamedu, Pillaiyarthittu, Thanampalayam	
10	Abishegapakkam	Village			Abishegapakkam, Theduvarnatham	
11	Thimma Nayakan Palayam	Village			Thimmanayakanpalayam	
