= Puducherry taluk =

Puducherry taluk (Tamil: [puðutːʃeːɾi]) is one of four taluks in the Puducherry district of the union territory of Puducherry. It comprises the city of Pondicherry and villages of Ariyankuppam Commune. Puducherry taluk is further divided into three sub-taluks (firkas).

== Etymology ==
Pondicherry is derived from Tamil putu-cēri "new village" and was first spelt as Poudichéry by the French. The u was later misread as n and the spelling Pondichéry stuck.

== Firkas ==
There are 3 revenue blocks of the taluk.

=== Puducherry ===
The Puducherry firka consists exclusively of Puducherry.

=== Ariyankuppam ===
Ariankuppam (11°53′49.16″N 79°48′18.56″E) contains the following revenue villages:

- Ariyankuppam
- Thimmanayakanpalayam
- Abishegapakkam
- Thavalakuppam
- Manavely
- Poornankuppam

=== Mudaliarpet ===
Mudaliarpet (11°55′17.56″N 79°48′55.65″E) contains the following revenue villages:

- Kompakkam
- Murungapakkam
- Olandai
- Pudupalayam
- Thengaithittu
