= Singirikudi =

- Village
- Location in Tamil Nadu, India Singirikudi (India)
- Coordinates: 11.8653°N 79.7808°E
- Country: India
- State: Tamil Nadu
- District: Cuddalore
- Taluk: Cuddalore
- Block: Cuddalore

Languages
  - Official: Tamil
- Time zone: UTC+5:30 (IST)
- PIN: 605007
- Telephone code: 0413
- Vehicle registration: TN-31

Singirikudi is a revenue village in Cuddalore of Tamil Nadu, India.

This is one of the Nava-Narasimha temples of Tamil Nadu which are popular for the worship of Vishnu as Narasimha. Also, this is one of the 3 temples along with Puvarasamkuppam and Parikkalpattu which are being worshipped on the same day by the devotees. The form of Vishnu as Narasimha here is Ugra Narasimha and he is disemboweling and killing the demon Hiranyakashipu on his laps. There are separate shrines for Lakshmi as Kanakavalli and Andal and unusually, they both are facing the opposite direction to that of Vishnu.

== History of Singirikudi Narashima Kanakavalli Temple ==
Sage Vasishtha who was cursed by King Nimi, approached his father Brahma and mother Sarasvati and sought their help. Brahma and Sarasvati asked him to proceed to Singirikudi and do penance propitiating Vishnu as Narasimha. Vashishtha went to Singirikudi and attained salvation through penance. Vishnu in the form of Narasimha was pleased with his devotion gave audience to him. This place is called Singirikudi as the presiding deity Vishnu here is Narasimha known as Singaperumal. Narasimha has 16 hands and looks ferocious as he disembowels and kills Hiranyakashipu. Narasimha's appearance star Svati is celebrated on a grand scale. This is a Prarthana Sthala for Vishnu as Narashima and Lakshmi as Kanakavalli.

== The Main Statues of Narasimha and Kanakavalli inside the Singirikudi Narashima Kanakavalli Temple ==
On Vishnu as Narashima's right side Hiranyakashipu's son Prahalada, Sage Vasishta and God Shukra are present. On Vishnu as Narashima's left side Hiranyakashipu's wife Kayadhu is represented when Vishnu as Narasimha disembowels and kills Hiranyakashipu. It appears that such a representation of Vishnu as Narasimha disemboweling and killing Hiranyakashipu is there in only two places in the Indian Subcontinent, with the other being in Rajasthan. Also, Lakshmi as Kanakavalli has a separate shrine here in this temple.
