= Ariyankuppam =

Ariyankuppam Ariancoupom
- Town
- Location in Puducherry, India Ariyankuppam (India)
- Coordinates: 11.896989°N 79.805156°E
- Country: India
- State: Puducherry
- District: Puducherry

Population (2001)
  - Total: 47,021

Languages
  - Official: Tamil
  - Additional: English, French
- Time zone: UTC+5:30 (IST)
- PIN: 605 007
- Telephone code: 0413
- Vehicle registration: PY-01
- Sex ratio: 50% ♂/♀

Ariyankuppam (also known by its former name Ariancoupom) is a Town, Commune, Sub-Taluk, and Assembly Constituency in the Union Territory of Puducherry, India. The streets in Ariyankuppam are straight and in grid form, similar to Puducherry boulevard.

== Origin of name ==
The name Ariyankuppam comes from Aricamedu, an archaeological site in Ariyankuppam. Ariyankuppam is also known as Ariyanagar or Ariankuppam.

== History ==
Ariyankuppam (Arikamedu) was an ancient Indian fishing village which was formerly a major port dedicated to bead making and trading with Roman traders. Now Ariyankuppam is administrated as a town under Puducherry Union Territory of India

== Demographics ==
As of 2001 India census, Ariyankuppam had a population of 47,021. Males constitute 50% of the population and females 50%. Ariyankuppam has an average literacy rate of 81.49%, male literacy is 88.89%, and female literacy is 74.13%. In Ariyankuppam, 10% of the population is under 6 years of age.

== Geography ==
Ariyankuppam is located at 11.54° N 79.48°E. Ariyankuppam is 5 km. from Puducherry city. It is in between Puducherry and Cuddalore on NH-45A. One can reach Ariyankuppam by any local bus from Puducherry to Veerapattinam. Also you can catch any bus to Cuddalore, Bahoor or Madukarai from Puducherry running via Ariyankuppam.

== Place of interest ==
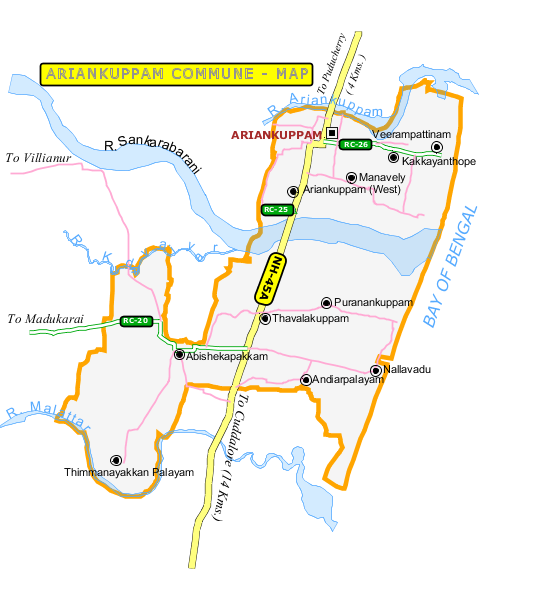
Map of Ariyankuppam Commune

=== Arikamedu Archaeological Excavation ===
Arikamedu is an archaeological site located at a distance of 1 km from Ariyankuppam, where Mortimer Wheeler conducted his best-known excavation in the 1940s. According to Wheeler, Arikamedu was a Tamil fishing village which was formerly a major port dedicated to bead making and trading with Roman traders. It flourished for centuries until the Romans left. Various Roman artifacts, such as a large number of amphorae bearing the mark of Roman potter schools VIBII, CAMURI and ITTA, have been found at the site, supporting the view on an ancient trade between Rome and the ancient Tamil country. An Archaeological Museum is also present.

=== Veerampattinam Temple Car Festival ===
Sengazhuneer Amman Temple (Tamil: செங்கழுநீர் அம்மன் கோவில்) at Veerampattinam is the abode of Sakti and is the oldest temple in Ariyankuppam. It is located at a distance of 2.5 km from Ariyankuppam. The goddess at the sanctum sanctorum faces the sea while the seven deities face the north. The temple also houses Amman, Ganapathy and Murugan gods.

A grand festival is celebrated every year for six continuous Fridays starting from the Tamil month of Aadi. Special importance is given to the fifth Friday of the six Fridays and this day is declared as public holiday by the Government of Puducherry. On this day, thousands of prigrims throng this holy place to celebrate the festival.

Right from the days of the French, it was a custom to invite the Lt. Governor of Puducherry to start the Temple car procession by pulling its long rope.

=== Chunnambar Boat House ===
Chunnambar Boat House (Tamil: சுன்னாம்பாறு படகு துறை) is located in Ariyankuppam. It is one of the major tourist spot in Puducherry and it can be reached at a distance of 7 km from Puducherry. The boat house needs to be renamed either as Ariyankuppam Boat House or Sankaraparani Boat House as it is located in Sankaraparani river bank at Ariyankuppam. Chunnambar is a verbal name given to Sankaraparani river. The boat house comes under Ariyankuppam (West) village of Ariyankuppam Commune.

=== PachaiVazhiAmman Kovil ===
Arulmigu PachaiVazhiAmman sametha Mannathaswamy Kovil11.884633°N 79.801388°E is an ancient Temple of Ariyankuppam. History of this temple goes back to 17th century. It is located between Ariyankuppam and Chunnambar Boat House at a distance of 1.2 km from Ariyankuppam. The presiding deity is Goddess Pachaivazhiamman (Tamil: பச்சைவாழி அம்மன்)

=== Church of Our Lady of Good Health ===
The church founded in 1690 was subsequently rebuilt several times. This is the oldest church still standing in the Roman Catholic Archdiocese of Puducherry and Cuddalore. The interior has rounded arches carrying a vault over the central aisle. A freestanding Crucifix is displayed upon the altar and brightly painted wooden images are set on shelves in the side walls.

=== Puducherry New Harbour ===
Puducherry New Harbour is located at Periya Veerapattinam. From here, one can see the New Light House, and The Notre Dame des Anges located in Puducherry Beach.
