= Puducherry district =

- District of Puducherry
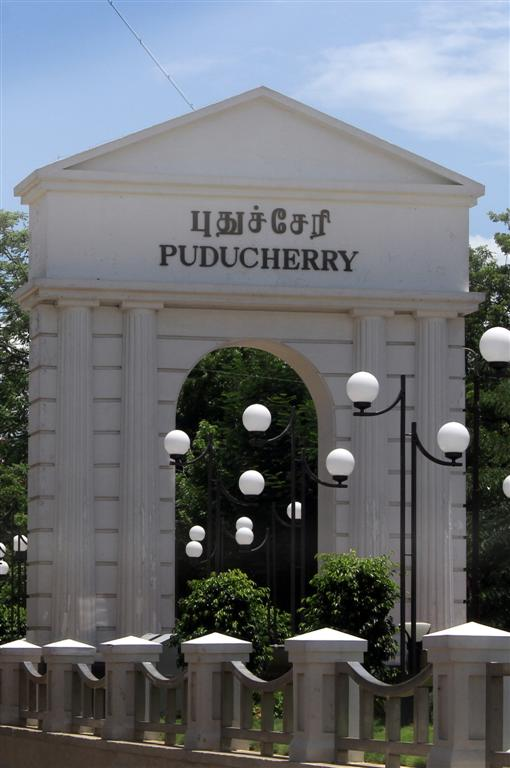

- Pondicherry in Puducherry Puducherry district (India)
- Coordinates: 11°55′N 79°49′E
- Country: India
- Union Territory: Puducherry
- Headquarters: Pondicherry
- Taluks: Bahour, Puducherry, Uzhavarkarai, Villianur

Government
  - Type: City Municipal Council
  - Body: Pondicherry Municipal Council (PDY)
  - District Collector: Shri. A. Kulothungan, IAS
  - Senior Superintendent of Police: Rahul Alwal, IPS

Area
  - Total: 293 km^{2} (113 sq mi)
- Elevation: 3 m (9.8 ft)

Population (2011)
  - Total: 950,289
  - Density: 3,240/km^{2} (8,400/sq mi)

Languages
  - Official: Tamil
  - Additional: English, French
- Time zone: UTC+5:30 (IST)
- PIN: 605xxx
- Telephone code: 0413
- ISO 3166 code: IN-PY
- Vehicle registration: PY-01
- Nearest districts: Viluppuram, Cuddalore
- Central location: 11°13′N 78°10′E
- Website: puducherry-dt.gov.in

Puducherry district, also known by its former name Pondicherry district, is one of the four districts of the union territory of Puducherry in South India. The district occupies an area of 290 square kilometres (110 sq mi), spread over 12 non-contiguous enclaves lying on or near the Bay of Bengal within a compact area in the state of Tamil Nadu. According to the 2011 census, the district has a population of 950,289.

== Etymology ==
Pondicherry is derived from Tamil putu-cēri "new village" and was first spelt as Poudichéry by the French. The u was later misread as n and the spelling Pondichéry stuck.

== Administrative divisions ==
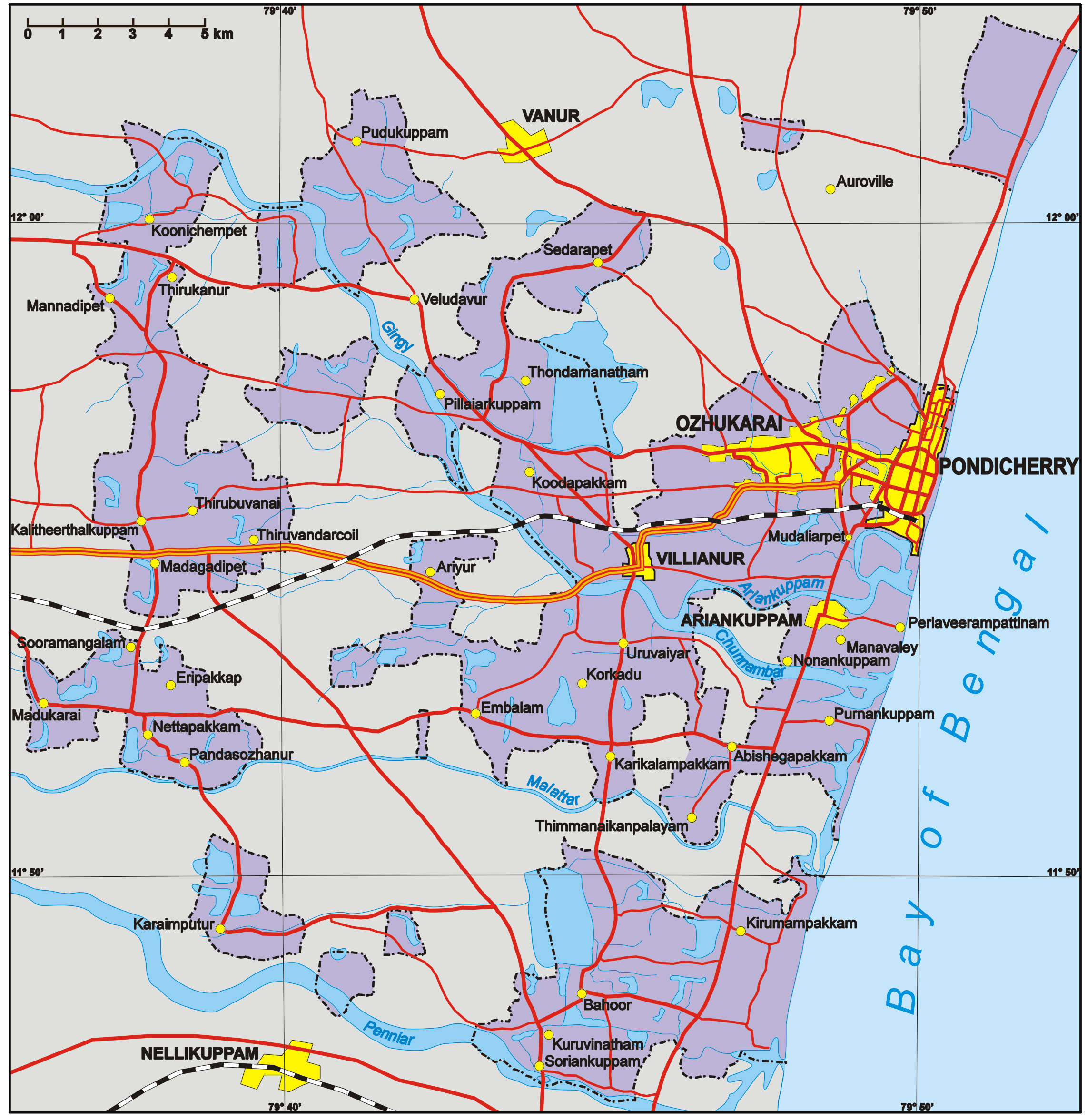
Geographically, the district of Puducherry is highly fragmented as it was during the colonial period.

| District | Taluks | Municipalities | Communes | Census Towns |
|---|---|---|---|---|
| Puducherry | Bahour | None | Bahour; Nettapakkam | None |
| Puducherry | Puducherry | Pondicherry | Ariyankuppam | Ariyankuppam; Manavely |
| Puducherry | Uzhavarkarai | Uzhavarkarai | None | None |
| Puducherry | Villianur | None | Mannadipattu; Villianur | Villianur |

For administrative purpose, the union territory of Puducherry is divided into eight taluks. Four of these, viz. Puducherry, Uzhavarkarai, Villianur and Bahour, together constitute Puducherry district. Among these four, only Uzhavarkarai taluk does not contain any rural area. The rural areas under the other three taluks are further divided commune panchayats (CP) or simply communes. Rural area of Puducherry taluk is covered by a single commune – Ariyankuppam, whereas Villianur taluk has two communes, viz. Villianur and Mannadipet, and rural area of Bahour taluk consists of two communes, viz. Bahour and Nettapakkam.

Census 2011 has identified three census towns in Puducherry district, along with three existing statutory towns. Pondicherry and Uzhavarkarai are the municipalities, Kurumbapet is the gram panchayat and the 3 census towns are: Ariyankuppam, Manavely and Villianur. Puducherry urban agglomeration consists of the area under the all these six towns along with Odiampet, which is an urban outgrowth.

For the ease of administration, Department of Revenue and Disaster Management, Government of Puducherry, has defined two sub-divisions of the Puducherry district, viz. Pondicherry North subdivision and Pondicherry South subdivision, each consisting of two taluks. Pondicherry North subdivision contains the taluks of Pondicherry and Uzhavarkarai, whereas Pondicherry South subdivision consists of the other two taluks of the district, viz. Villianur and Bahour. Each of these four taluks are further divided into sub-taluks/firkas which consists of revenue villages from rural/semi-urban/urban area.

Planning and Research Department, Government of Puducherry, further defines the notion of a block. The union territory of Puducherry is divided into six blocks, three of which forms the Puducherry district, viz. Ariyankuppam, Ozkhukarai and Villianur.

== Demographics ==
Puducherry's population, 950,289, is roughly equal to that of the nation of Fiji or the US state of Delaware. This gives it a ranking of 460th in India (out of a total of 640). The district has a population density of 3,231 inhabitants per square kilometre (8,370/sq mi). Its population growth rate over the decade 2001-2011 was 28.73%. Puducherry has a sex ratio of 1,031 females for every 1,000 males, and a literacy rate of 86.13%.

=== Religion ===
Religion in Puducherry district (2011)
1. Hinduism (90.0%)
2. Christianity (6.14%)
3. Islam (3.44%)
4. Others (0.42%)

According to the official 2011 census data, Hinduism is the predominant religion in the Puducherry district, followed by 90.00% of the inhabitants. Christians represent the largest religious minority at 6.14%, followed by Muslims at 3.44%. Other religious groups, including Jains, Buddhists, and Sikhs, combine to constitute less than half a percent of the district's population.

=== Language ===
Languages in Puducherry district (2011)
1. Tamil (94.5%)
2. Telugu (1.63%)
3. Malayalam (1.05%)
4. Others (2.80%)

Because the Puducherry district is surrounded entirely by the state of Tamil Nadu, the vast majority of its population speaks Tamil as a first language, accounting for 94.52% of the district's residents as of the 2011 census. Due to interstate migration within neighboring regions, the district also supports small minorities of Telugu (1.63%) and Malayalam (1.05%) speakers. Other regional languages like Urdu and Hindi, alongside a small enclave of French speakers stemming from colonial ties, form the remaining 2.80%.
