= List of state highways in Puducherry =

State Highways or RC Roads are the major roads next to National Highways in Puducherry District designated with numbering. Public Works Department (PWD), Puducherry is primarily responsible for planning, design, construction and maintenance of RC Roads.

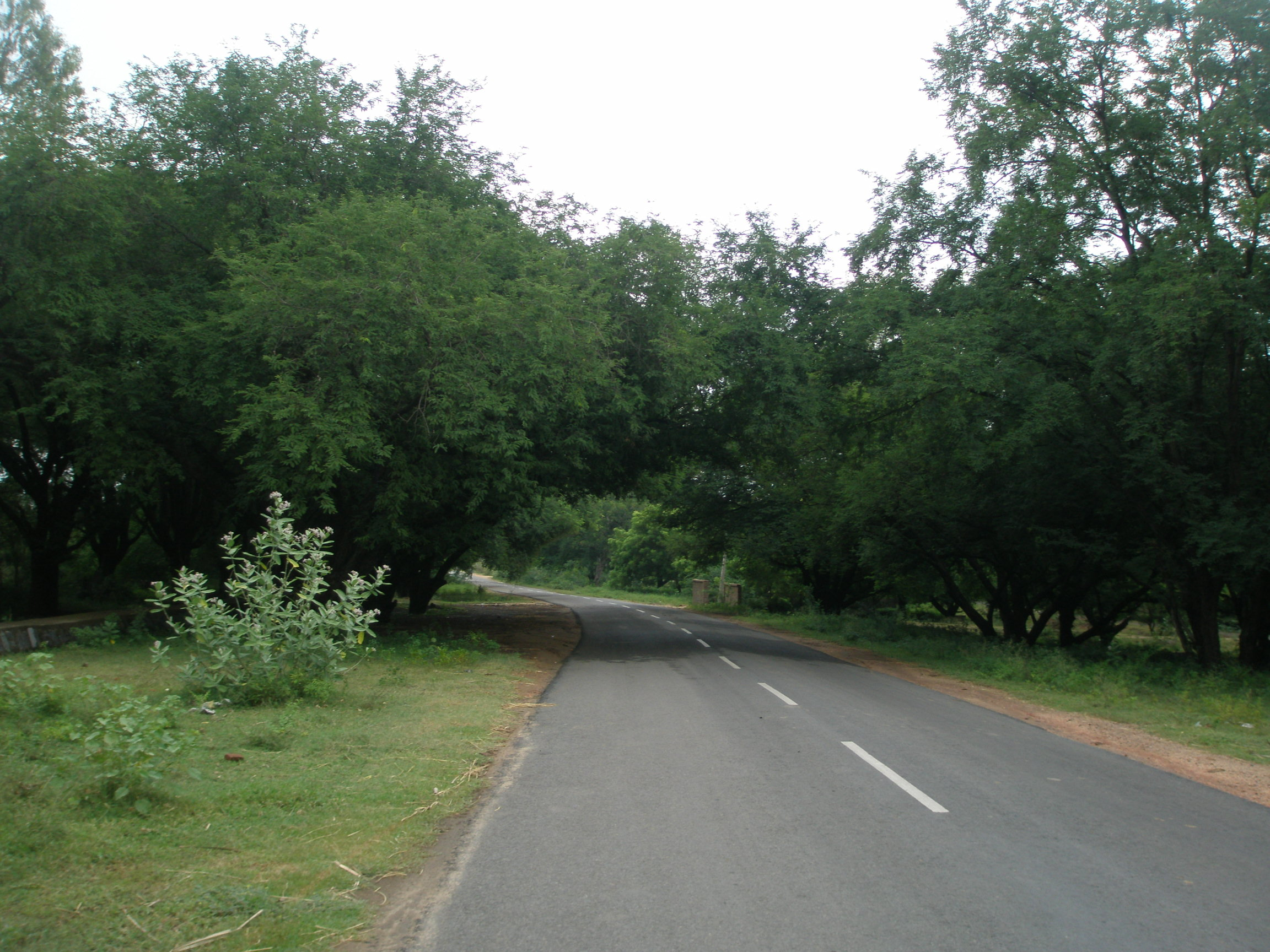
Lush green route on Frontier Road near PS Palayam (RC-21)

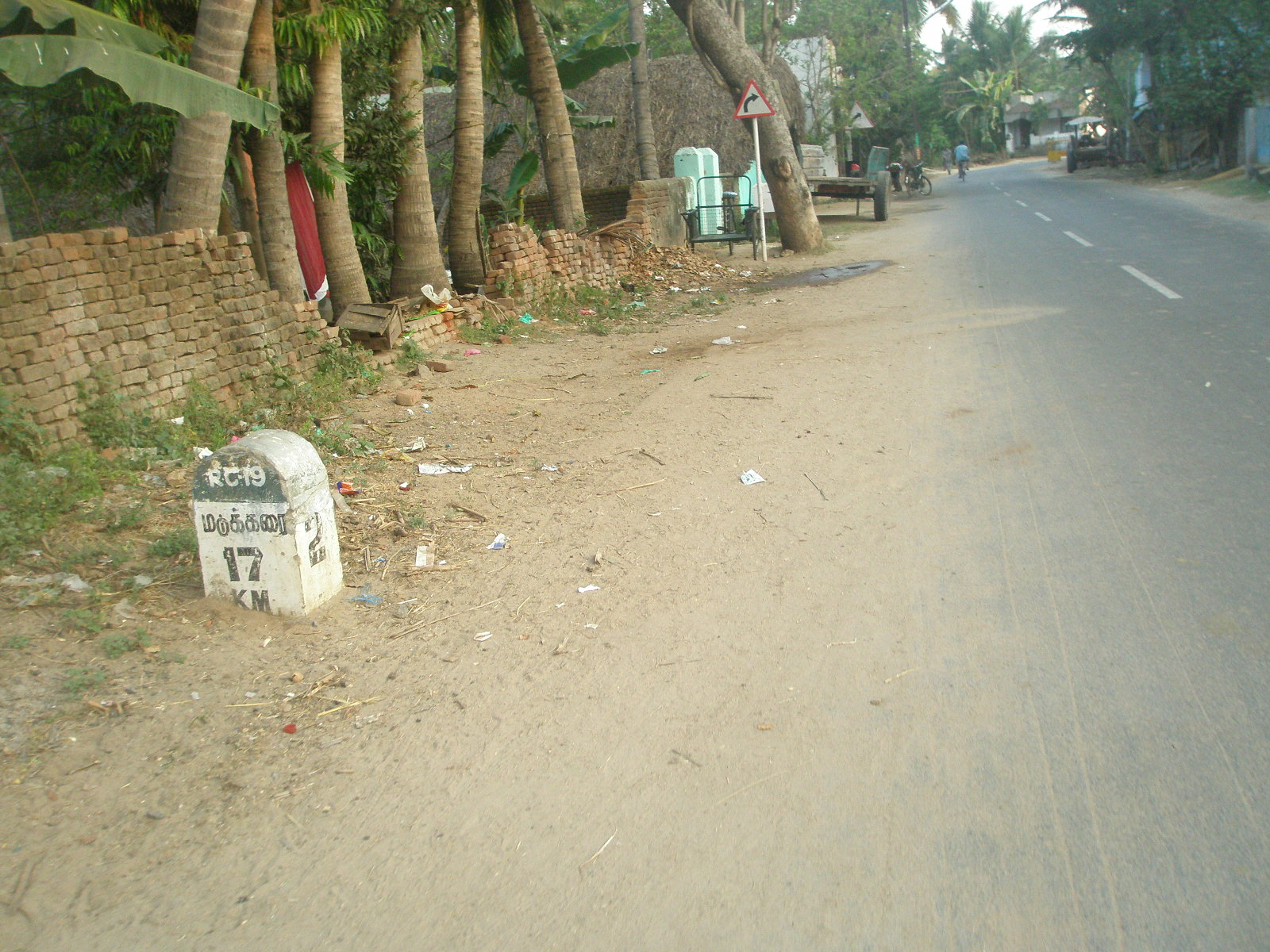
2nd Kilometre Stone on RC-19 showing Maducarai is 17 Kilometres from Mangalam

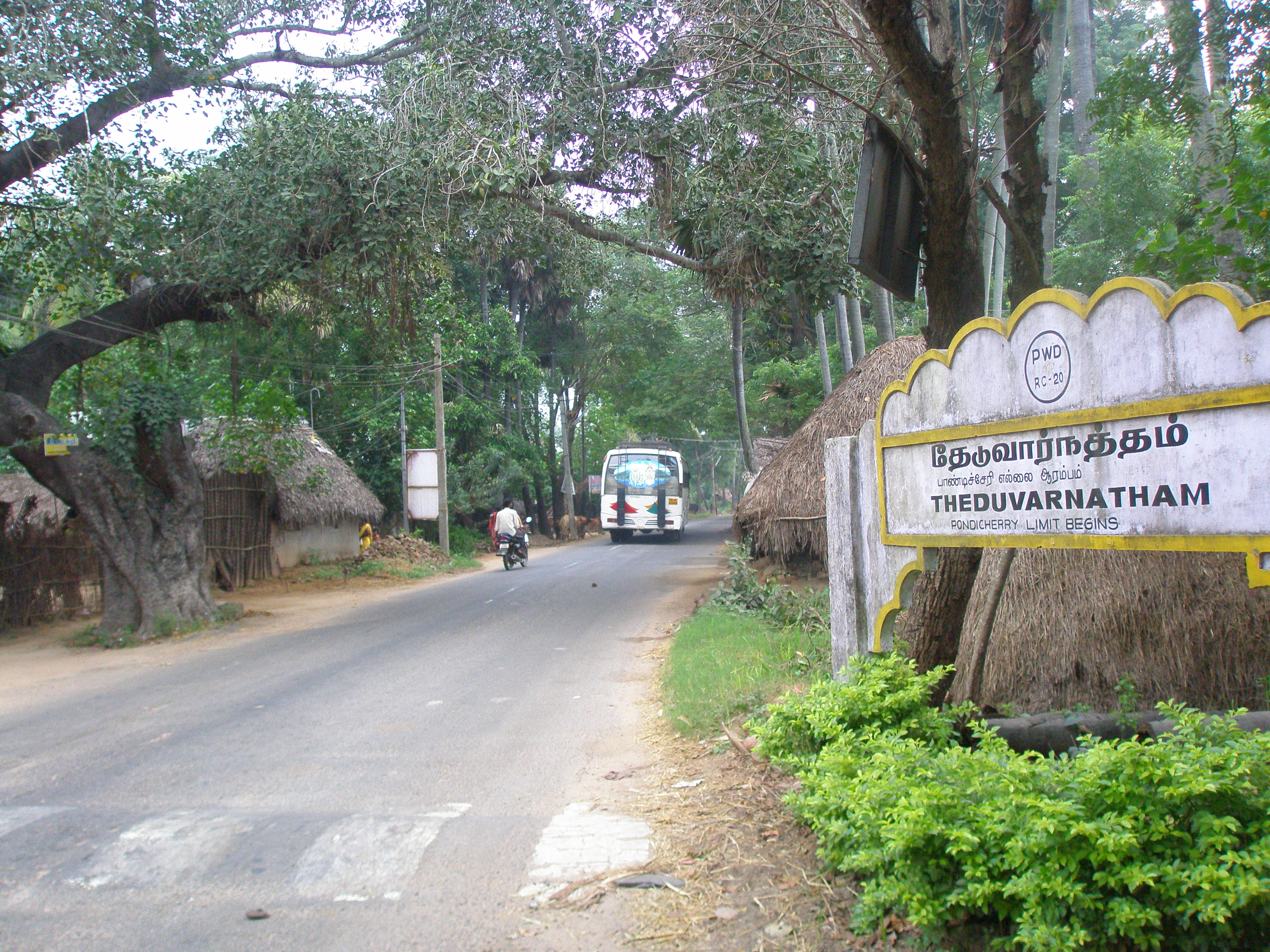
Ariyankuppam Commune West Entrance (RC-20)

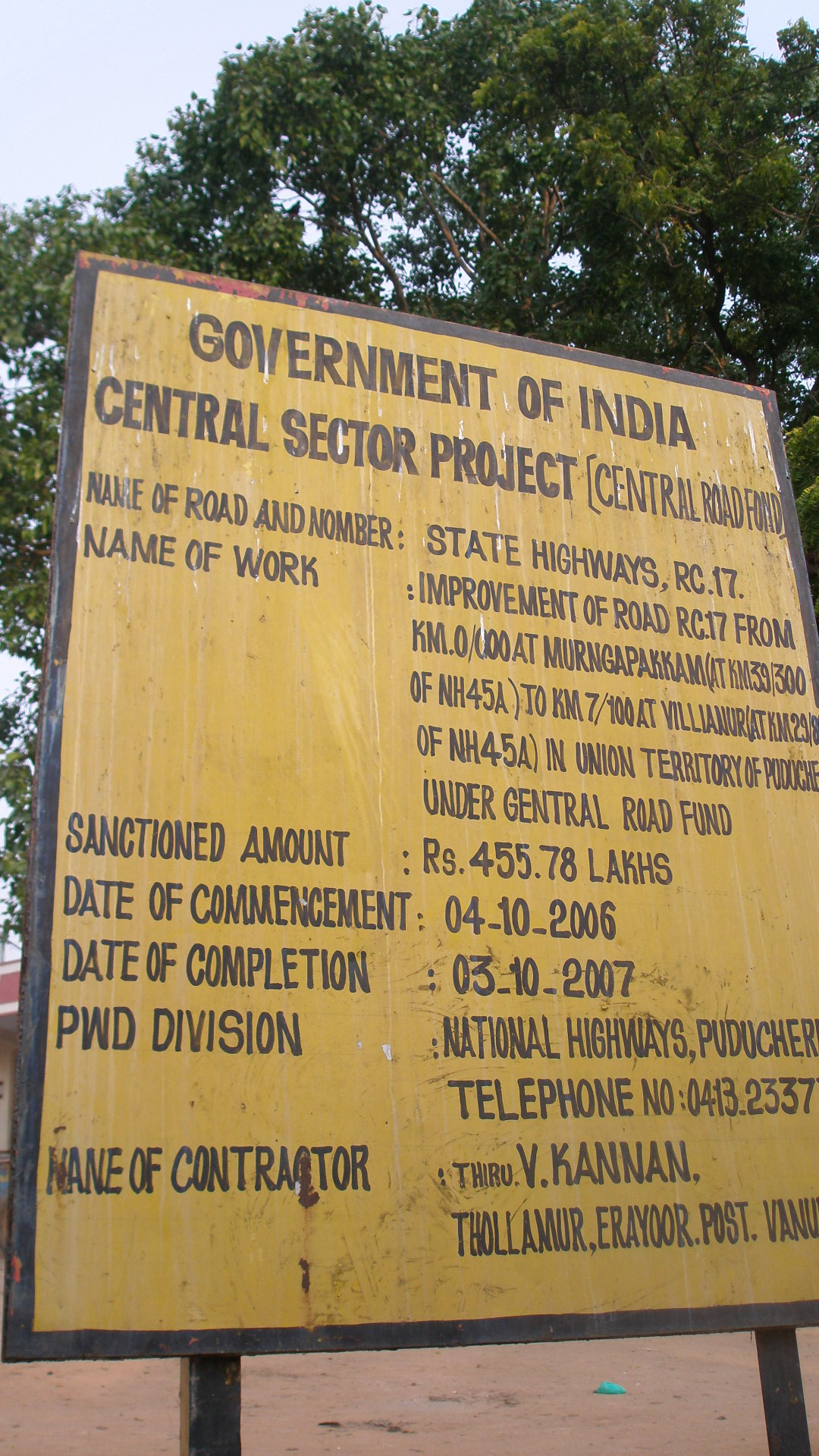
Work Board on RC-17

== Divisions ==
PWD operates through 3 divisions for maintaining RC Roads namely-

- Building & Roads (North) abbreviated as BRN
- Building & Roads (Center) abbreviated as BRC
- Building & Roads (South) abbreviated as BRS

== Roads ==
| Sl. No. | RC Number | Route | Length (km) |
|---|---|---|---|
| 1 | RC-1 | Boulevard Roads | 5.29 |
| 2 | RC-2 | Puducherry - Cuddalore Road (part) (Subbaiah Salai junction to Marapalam junction via Colas Nagar and Uppalam) | 2.655 |
| 3 | RC-3 | Puducherry - Villupuram Road (part) (Goubert Avenue to Indira Gandhi Circle via Lal Bahadur Sastri Street and Maraimalai Adigal Salai) | 3.3 |
| 4 | RC-4 | Puducherry - Vazhudavoor Road (RC-4) Goubert Avenue to Koonichempet state border via Nehru Street and Kamaraj Salai | 25.916 (including 7.577 km in Tamil Nadu) |
| 5 | RC-5 | Pondicherry - Marakanam Road (RC-5) (Part) Subbaiah Salai junction to Muthialpet state border) via Mahatma Gandhi Road | 3.5 |
| 6 | RC-6 | Puducherry - Tindivanam Road (upgraded as NH-66) | 3.55 km |
| 7 | RC-7 | Suthukeny Road | 7.700 (including 1.753 km in Tamil Nadu) |
| 8 | RC-8 | Puliansalai Road | 0.966 |
| 9 | RC-9 | Kosapalayam Road | 0.768 |
| 10 | RC-10 | Ellapillaichavady Road excluding portion of NH-66 | 0.45 |
| 11 | RC-11 | Muthirapalayam Road | 1.386 |
| 12 | RC-12 | Sanyasikuppam Road | 18.198 (including 7.370 km in Tamil Nadu) |
| 13 | RC-13 | Vadhanur Road | 10.515 (including 2.350 km in Tamil Nadu) |
| 14 | RC-14 | Mill Road | 1.259 |
| 15 | RC-14 Bis | Bharathi Mill Road | 0.49 |
| 16 | RC-15 | Karamanikuppam Road | 1.74 |
| 17 | RC-16 | Koodapakkam Road | 4.488 |
| 18 | RC-16 Bis | Car Streets of Villianur Temple | 1.086 |
| 19 | RC-17 | Murungapakkam–Villianur Road | 6.416 |
| 20 | RC-18 | Villianur–Bahour Road | 11.415 (including 0.994 in Tamil Nadu) |
| 21 | RC-19 | Mangalam–Embalam–Maducarai Road | 18.565 (including 5.748 Tamil Nadu) |
| 22 | RC-20 | Thavalakuppam–Embalam Road | 9.123 (including 1.637 Tamil Nadu) |
| 23 | RC-21 | Frontier Road | 30.663 (including 3.306 Tamil Nadu) |
| 24 | RC-22 | Paththukannu–Sedarapet Road | 4.307 |
| 25 | RC-23 | Vaithikuppam Road | 0.922 |
| 26 | RC-24 | Muthiyalpet–Lawspet Road | 4.112 |
| 27 | RC-25 | Ariyankuppam - Nonankuppam Road | 0.484 |
| 28 | RC-26 | Ariyankuppam – Veerampattinam Road | 2.005 |
| 29 | RC-27 | Kirumampakkam–Bahour Road | 4.6 |
| 30 | RC-28 | Kanniakoil–Bahour Road | 3.661 |
| 31 | RC-29 | Villianur–Villupuram Road (Part) from Villianur Marie to junction of new bypass road | 0.835 |
| 32 | RC-30 | Sembiapalayam–Kizhur Road | 7.094 |
| 33 | RC-31 | Bahour–Karaimedu Road | 0.774 |
| 34 | RC-32 | Mannadipet–Thirukkanur Road | 2.46 |
| 35 | RC-33 | Pakkam–Cuddalore Road | 1.15 |

== See also ==
- Puducherry road network
- Road network in Karaikal District
- Road network in Yanam District
- Road network in Mahe District
