= Bahour =

- Town
- Location in Puducherry, India Bahour (India)
- Coordinates: 11.8057275°N 79.7426721°E
- Country: India
- State: Puducherry
- District: Puducherry
- Taluk: Bahour
- Commune: Bahour

Population (2001)
  - Total: 36,983

Languages
  - Official: Tamil
  - Additional: English, French
- Time zone: UTC+5:30 (IST)
- PIN: 607 402
- Telephone code: 0413
- Vehicle registration: PY-01
- Sex ratio: 50% ♂/♀

Bahour is a town, Commune, Taluk and Assembly Constituency in the Union Territory of Puducherry, India. It consists of four non-contiguous areas, including three of the nine true enclaves of Puducherry. It is home to the second largest and perhaps the oldest irrigation lake in the region- the Bahour Eri. The lake has been in existence since the Chola period. Bahour also has reports of lignite deposits but it is not exploited due to its close proximity to the sea and the likelihood of seeping seawater, adulterating the ground water. It is a major access point for villages south of Puducherry and forms the southern border to the Union territory. The city is also known as the ‘rice bowl of Puducherry’ since the area is suitable for Paddy (rice) cultivation.

== History ==
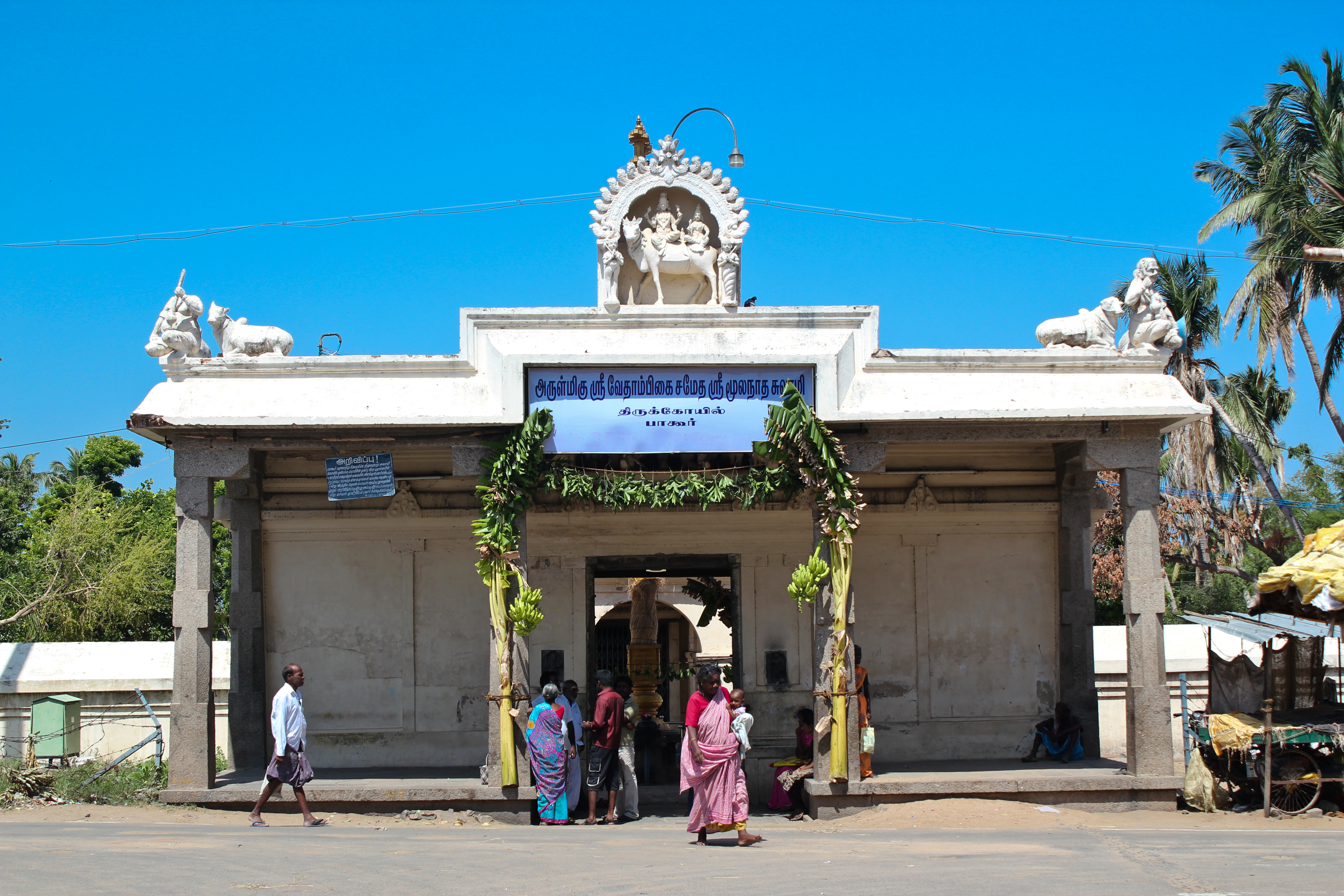
Mulanathaswami Temple

The historical record of Bahour dates back as early as the Chola Period. Bahour is home to an ancient temple- Sri Moolanathaswamy Temple, built around the 10th century. The earliest inscriptions on the walls of this temple are of Kannara Dev (Krishna III of Rashtrakuta Dynasty). Gabriel Jouveau-Dubreuil considered that this temple marked a transition from the Pallava to Chola style of architecture. Evidence also exists of the presence of a centre for Sanskrit studies- the Vidyasthana in the region which was known for imparting the Chaturdasa Vidya -fourteen branches of learning (i.e. the four Vedas, the six Vedangas, Mimamsa, Nyaya, Dharma Sastra and Puranas). The evidence of this centre can be found through the accounts of the Pallava King Nrpatungavarman(869–880 AD) which has mentions of grants of three villages as endowments to the Vidyasthana by the minister of the King. The inscriptions of Rashtrukta King Krishna III also give an account of an elaborate system of village administration dating back to the tenth century. Inscriptions on the Mulasthanam temple give an account of an assembly, ‘The Great Assembly of Vahur’ which looked after village administration. References to Bahour are also found as ‘Vahour’ and later as ‘Sri Alagiya Chola Chaturvedimangalam’ from the 25th year of Rajaraja I and onwards. Pre historic evidence of funeral urns excavated by archaeologist Kuppuswamy have also been found here, making the territory an area of prehistoric importance.

== Bahour Lake ==
Bahour Lake is a major tourist spot in Bahour. It is one of the Important Bird Areas (IBA) in Puducherry, the other being Ossudu Lake. ‘Bahour Eri’ or Bahour Lake in the Bahour Commune is the second largest and perhaps the oldest irrigation lake in the region. The lake was in existence since the Chola Period. Inscriptions of Kannaradev(Krishna III of Rashtrukta Dynasty) give an account of the lake as ‘Peria Eri’ (the big lake) and also as Kadambu Eri (the lake surrounded by Kadambu Trees). Accounts of Rajaraja give a brief of how tax in form of paddy was collected for mainainance of the lake, failure of which would cost 25 Gold currencies and the task of digging up the lake to one who failed to pay the taxes. There are also accounts of a Council of Elders known as ‘Eri Varya Perumakkal’ whose responsibility was to look after the maintenance of lake and proper distribution of its water. Inscriptions of Chola King, Rajendra I mention how besides the tank task in form of paddy, every year, a pit measuring two rods by width and one rod by depth was to be dug by each member of the village aged between 10 and 80 years excepting untouchables. There are mentions of punishments in form of compensation even to the Lake Committee if they failed to collect taxes.

=== Historic public works at the Bahour Lake ===
Public works at the lake have been historically done by Devdasis. The Moolanathaswamy Temple displays numerous sculptures of Devdasis carved out of granite in various dancing postures. The plaque on the western side of the Ayi Mandapam Monument narrates how two Devdasi sisters- Bangari and Singari were responsible for the renewal of the lake. Bangari, to put an end to the dependency of the lake on rain water had taken up the task of building an irrigation canal which was excavated from Pennaiyar River to Bahour Lake and ran at the length of 13 km. Singari took up the task of renovating and desilting the lake. It was this initiative of the two sisters that had benefitted the whole of Bahour.

== Demographics ==
=== Population ===
As per the 2011 Census of the Bahour Revenue Village, the total population at Bahour ranges to around 10927 persons with 5406 Male and 5521 female population.

=== Health care ===
A primary health care centre is functioning at Bahour which provides round the clock services with the assistance of a Medical Officer

=== Education facilities ===
Bahour has a number of government and private schools. Among the Government schools are: • Govt. Higher Secondary School, • Govt. Higher Secondary School for girls • Govt. Boys Middle School Among the private schools are: • Prof. Annuswamy Higher Secondary School • Our Lady of Victory English Higher Secondary School Two private engineering colleges namely Alpha Engineering College and Sri Ganesh Engineering College and two private medical colleges namely:Gandhi Medical College and Arupadai Veedu Medical College are functioning around Bahour

== Geography ==
Bahour is located at 11.806° N 79.74°E. Bahour is 21 km. from Puducherry city. It is directly connected with Puducherry and Cuddalore by frequent bus service.

== Road network ==
Five RC Roads passes through Bahour. They are

- Villianur–Bahour Road (RC-18)
- Kirumampakkam–Bahour Road (RC-27)
- Kanniakoil–Bahour Road (RC-28)
- Bahour–Karaimedu Road (RC-31)
- Pakkam–Cuddalore Road (RC-33)

== Place of interest ==
=== Mulanathaswami Temple, Bahour ===
Mulanathaswami Temple is located in the heart of Bahour. This temple belongs to Chola period. Marvel sculptures in the temple displays Chola's architecture. It is declared as an Archaeological monument and is maintained by ASI.

== Gallery ==
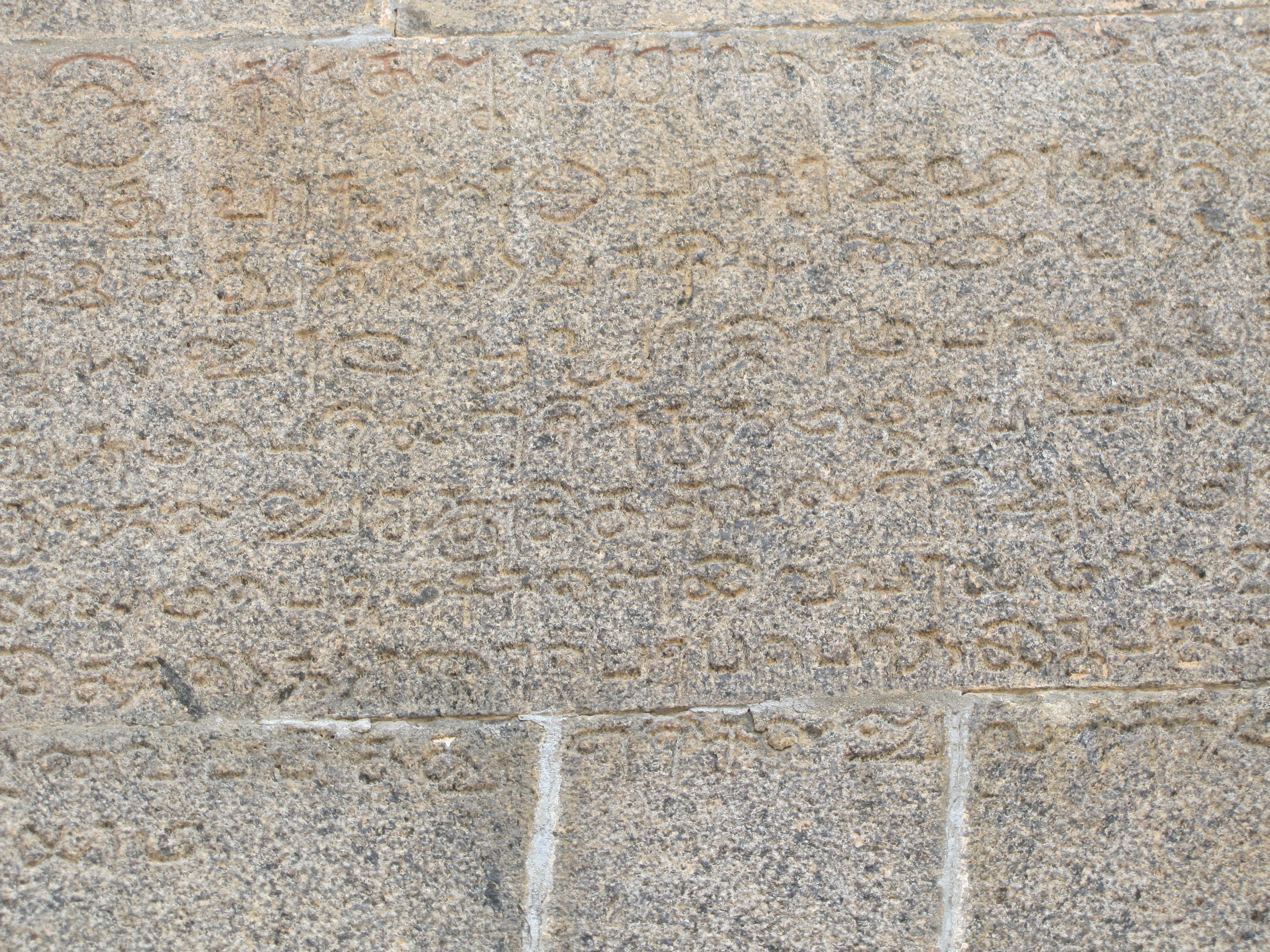
Marvel sculptures in the temple

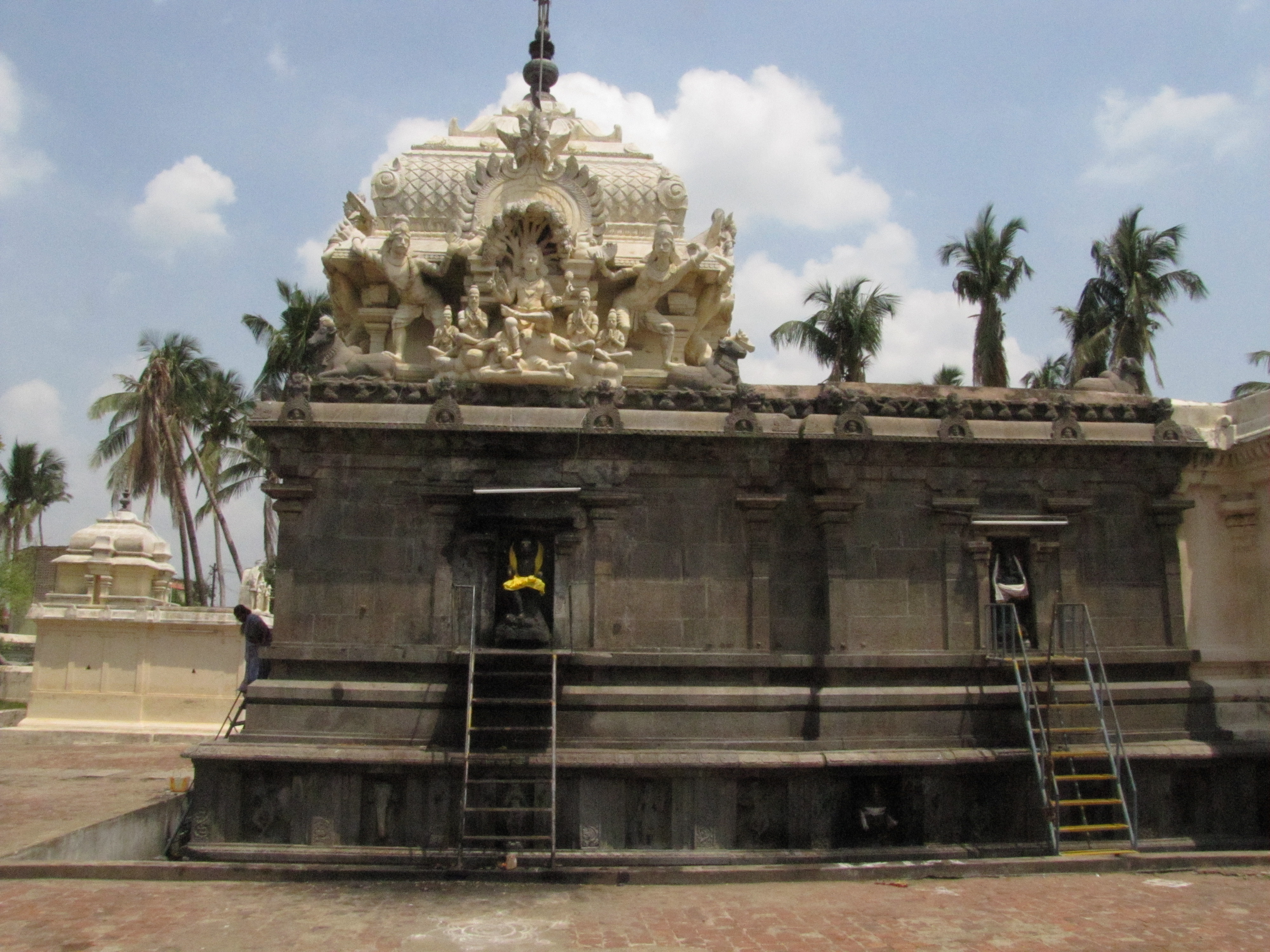
View from Southern direction

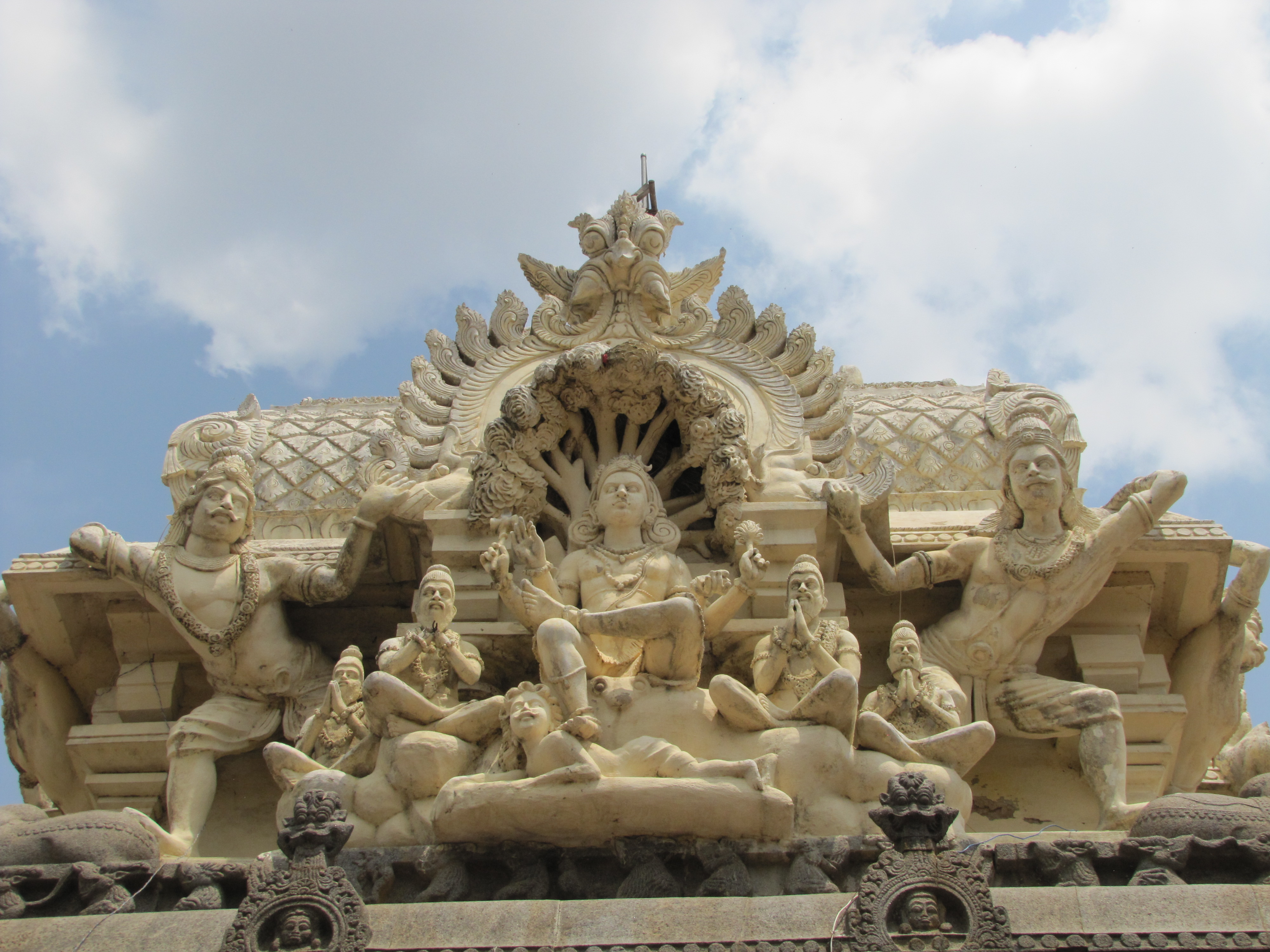
Dhakshnamoorthy Sculpture

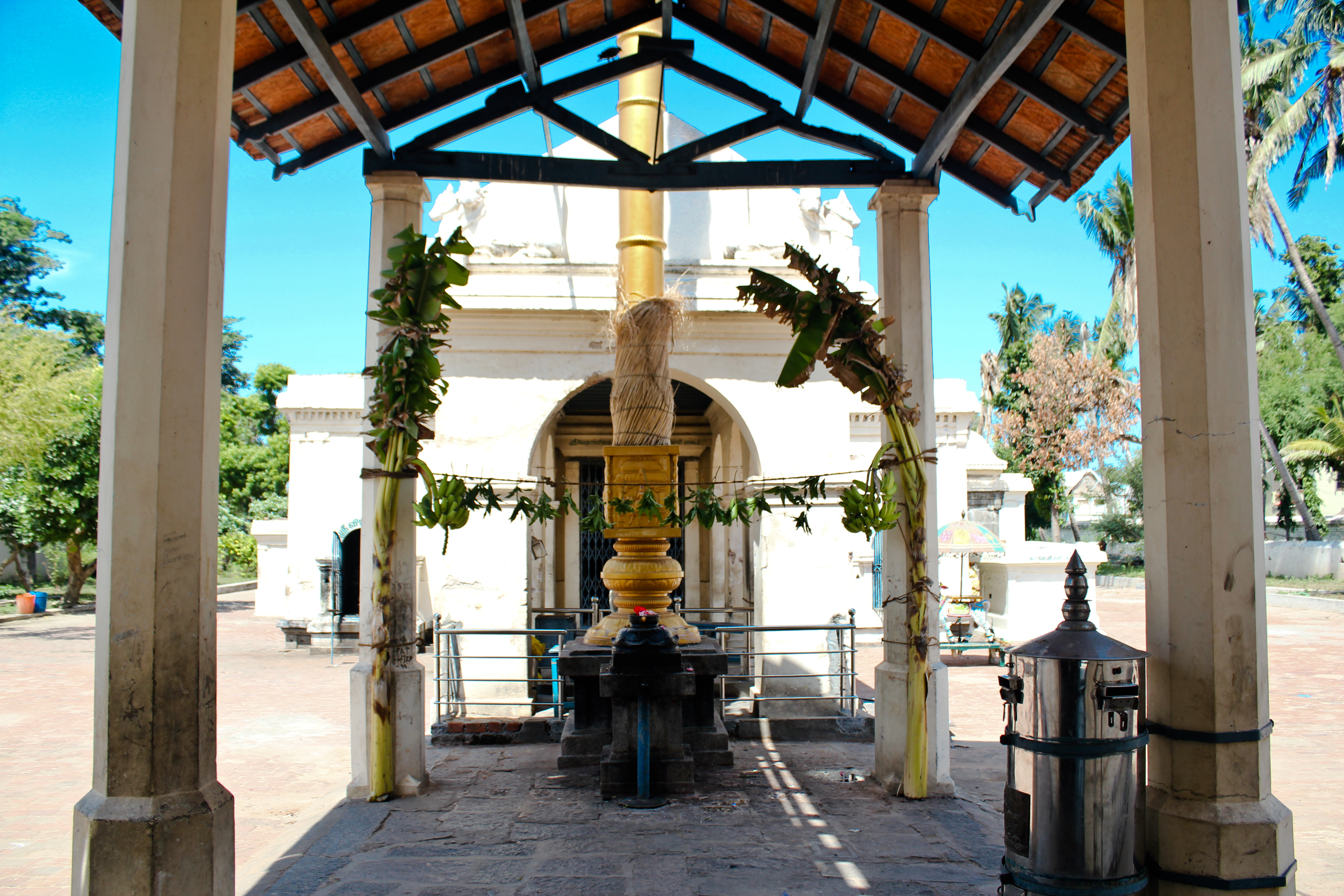
Mulanathaswami Temple

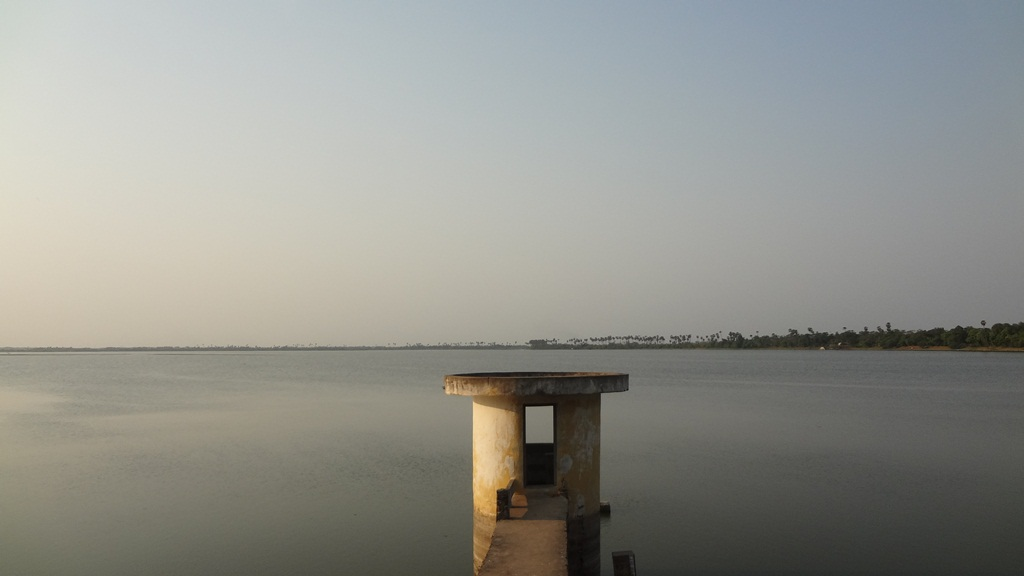
Bahour Lake

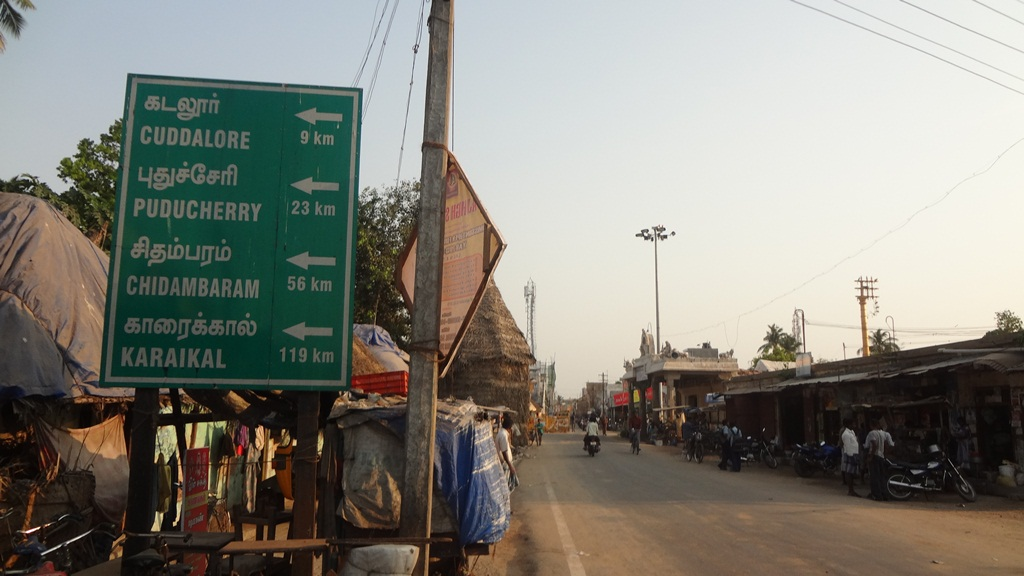
Distance to Places reachable from East of Bahour

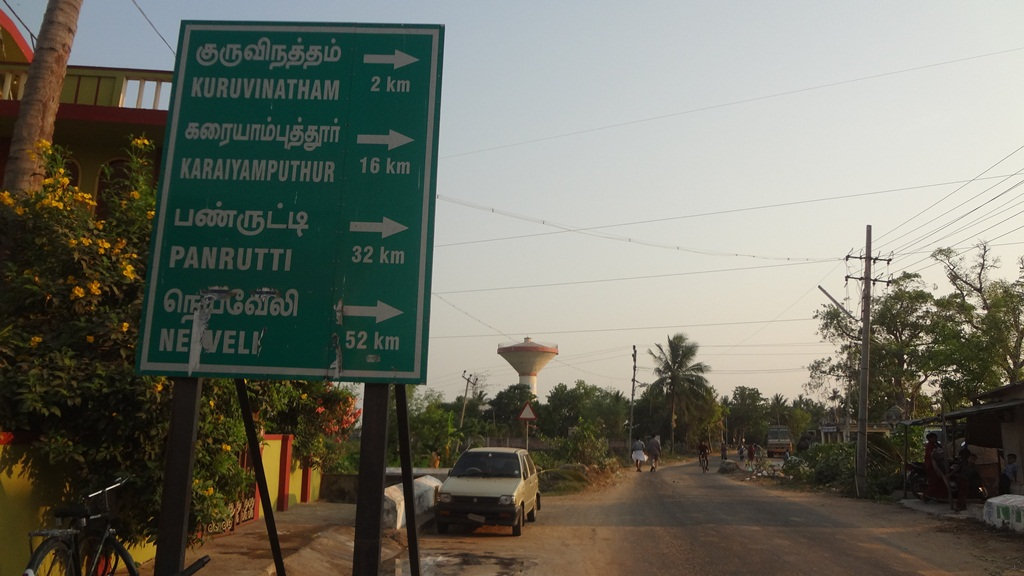
Distance to Places reachable from West of Bahour
