= Sengazhuneer Amman Temple =

Sengazhuneer Amman Temple செங்கழுநீர் அம்மன் கோவில் is situated at Veerampattinam in the Union Territory of Puducherry, India. It’s known to be an oldest and powerful temple in Puducherry. The age of the temple is not known for centuries and could be easily about 1000 years old.

== History ==
Veerampattinam is a fishing village and a man named Veeraraghavan was living there in an ancient time. One fine morning, he set out for fishing in a nearby rivulet. He had no catch till sunset and was totally disappointed but he didn’t give up and made a final attempt before he returned home. When he was withdrawing the net, he was very happy as he felt a heavy resistant which is usually due to a big catch. But he disappointed eventually as there was no fish instead it was a big piece of wood. He took it home and kept it in the backyard.

One day his wife found no firewood for cooking and decided to cut the wood to make it useful. When she hit the wood with an axe, it was shocking and she couldn’t believe it as blood was oozing out from the axe cut. She immediately informed her husband and the villagers. Astonished Veeraraghavan kept the wood inside his home and started performing pooja. He was very happy and life became prosperous for him.

After some days, Amman (Lady God) appeared in Veeraraghavan’s dream and told him that you got the wood because of my blessings. She asked him to use the wood as Peeta (Base) and to install her idol on the base at a specific location in the village. She asked him to worship the idol as "Sengazhuneer Amman" before disappearing from his dream.

Veeraraghavan informed the villagers about his dream. All the villagers set out to find the place indicated by Amman. They found an ant-hill from where a serpent (cobra) came out and beat the ground thrice with its hood, thus showing them the place where they had to establish the idol. The wood was brought for setting the peeta and made a granite idol of Sengazhuneer Amman head.

The temple was gradually developed stage by stage from a small hut to a huge temple over the centuries. A temple car was made centuries ago and it was the first temple in the province of Puducherry to have a temple car.

== Festival ==
A grand festival is celebrated every year for six continuous Fridays starting from the Tamil month of Aadi. Special importance is given to the fifth Friday and is declared as public holiday by the Government of Puducherry. On this day, thousands of pilgrims throng this holy place to pull the Temple car and celebrate the festival. The festival is being celebrated since the date immemorial. Right from the days of the French rule, it was a custom to invite the Lt. Governor of Puducherry to commemorate the festival and start the Temple car procession by pulling its super giant rope. The last Friday will evidence ‘muthu pallakku’ festival which is the end of the six-week-long festival. Over 100,000 to 200,000 people from different regions Puducherry and Tamil Nadu will gather for 5th and 6th Fridays. The people of the village come together to organize and celebrate the festival in a greater way with happiness.

Other festivals including Masi Magam, Mattu pongal, Kavadi, Vinayaka Chaturthi, Ammbu vizha (Vijayadashami) and Thirukaarthigai (Sokka Paanai) were also celebrated at different occasions.
