= Bahour Lake =

Lake in Puducherry, India

- French: Lac Bahour
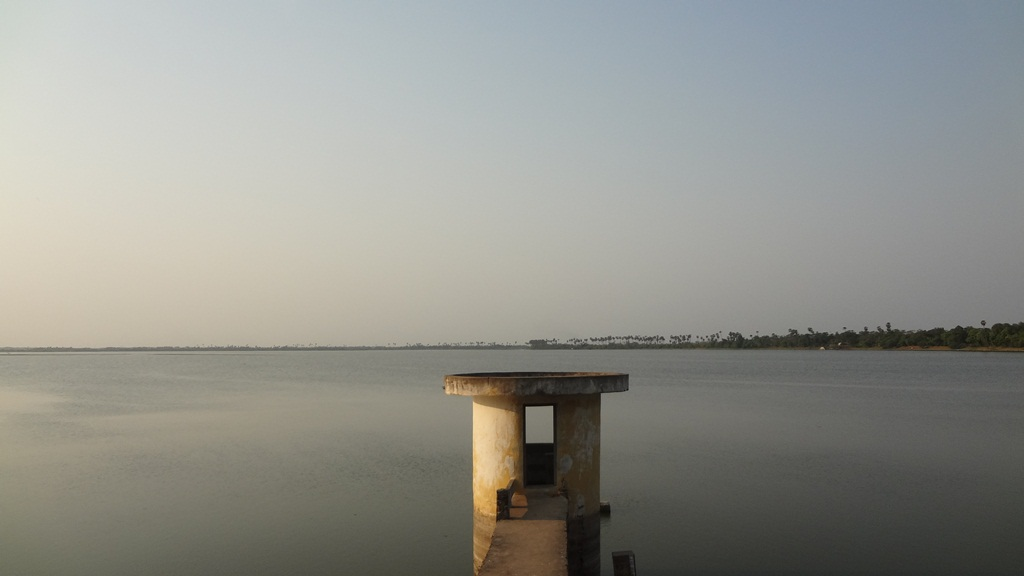
- Bahour Lake

- Location within Puducherry Location within India
- Interactive map of Bahour Lake
- Location: Puducherry, India
- Coordinates: 11.826778°N 79.737297°E
- Type: lake

Bahour Lake (French: Lac Bahour) is the second largest lake in the Indian union territory of Puducherry This lake is recognized as one of the Important Bird Areas (IBA) of Puducherry
