= State Highway RC-2 (Puducherry) =

Road in Puducherry, India

State Highway RC-2

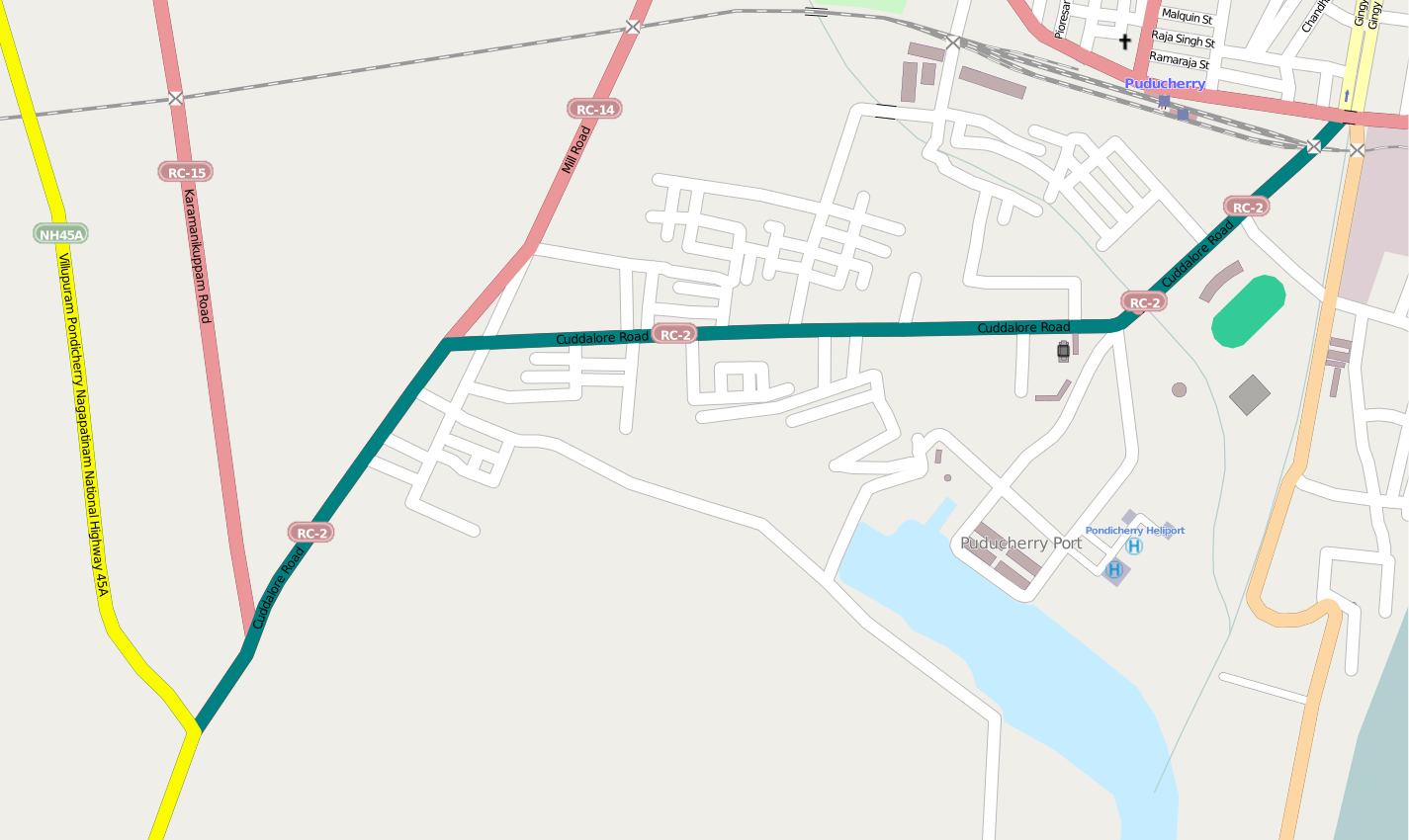

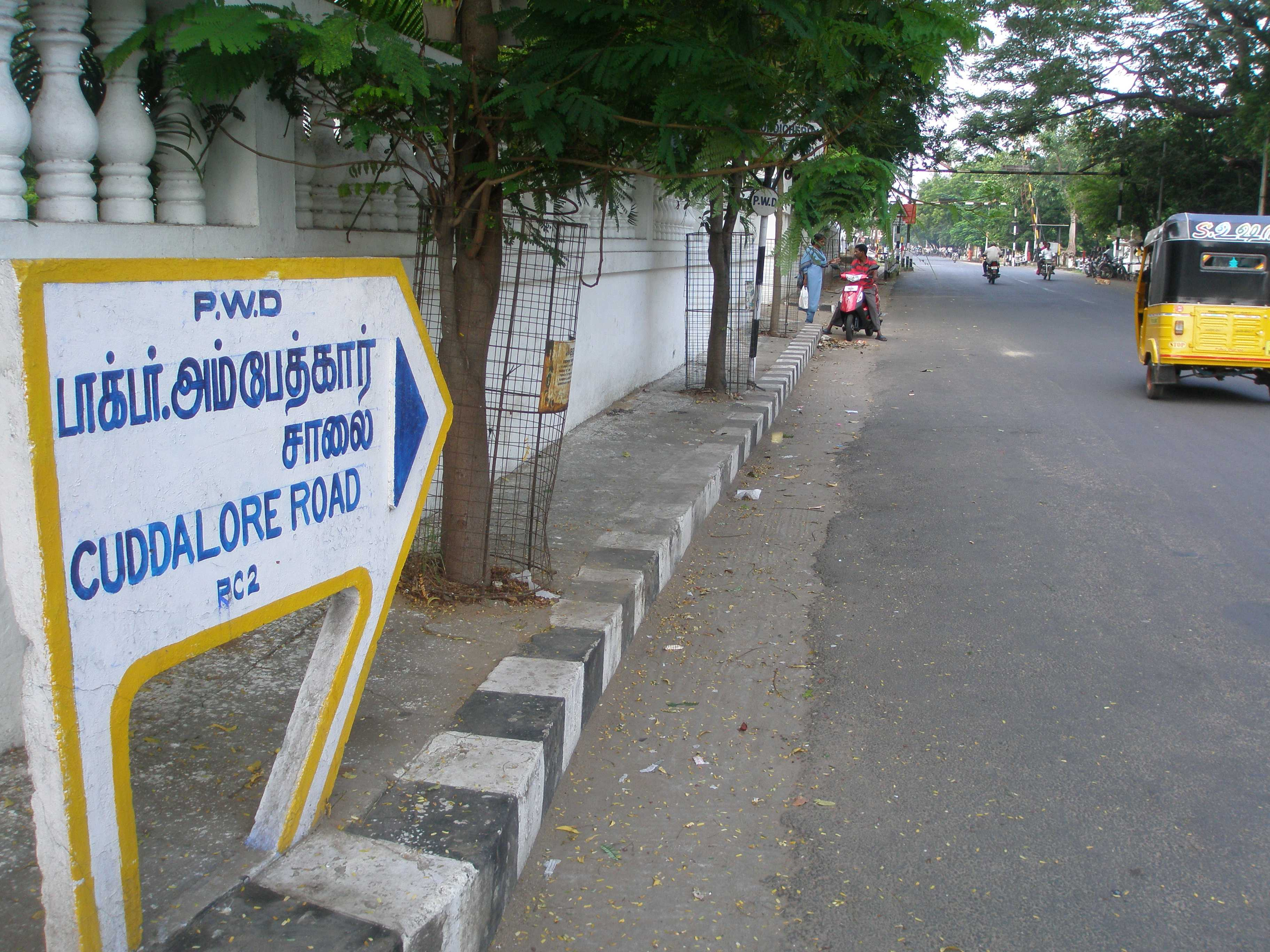
- Puducherry-Cuddalore Road (RC-2)

Route information
- Maintained by Public Works Department (PWD), Puducherry
- Length: 2.655 km (1.650 mi)

Major junctions
- North end: Uppalam Water Tank
- RC-1 at South Boulevard, RC-14 and RC-14Bis at Muthaliarpet, RC-15 and NH-45A at Marappalam Square
- South end: Marappalam Square

Location
- Country: India
- Union territories: Puducherry
- Districts: Puducherry
- Primary destinations: Uppalam, Muthaliarpet

Highway system
- Roads in India; Expressways; National; State; Asian

RC-2 or Cuddalore Road is a state highway that connects Puducherry with Cuddalore. It runs from Boulevard via Uppalam, Muthaliarpet, Ariyankuppam, Kirumampakkam up to Mullodai Arch (Southern Border of Puducherry District on Cuddalore Road). Due to the extension of Villupuram-Puducherry National Highway to Nagapattinam, this road got terminated at Marappalam Square. Now this road is known as Dr. Ambedkar Road.

== Route ==
RC-2 starts from RC-1 at Uppalam Water Tank and runs southward via Colas Nagar till the Uppalam Drain Bridge and then turn west till Muthaliarpet and from there onward it runs southward. It got terminated with NH-45A at Marappalam Square.

== Landmarks ==
- Indira Gandhi Sports Stadium, Puducherry
- TNSTC Depot
- Bharathi Mill
