= State Highway RC-28 (Puducherry) =

Road in Puducherry, India

State Highway RC-28

Route information
- Maintained by Public Works Department (PWD), Puducherry
- Length: 3.661 km (2.275 mi)

Major junctions
- RC-18 at Bahour

Location
- Country: India
- Union territories: Puducherry
- Districts: Puducherry

Highway system
- Roads in India; Expressways; National; State; Asian

RC-28 or Kanniakoil-Bahour Road branches out from NH-45A at Kanniakoil and ends at Bahour.
