= State Highway RC-27 (Puducherry) =

Road in Puducherry, India

State Highway RC-27

Route information
- Maintained by Public Works Department (PWD), Puducherry
- Length: 4.6 km (2.9 mi)

Major junctions
- RC-18 at Bahour

Location
- Country: India
- Union territories: Puducherry
- Districts: Puducherry

Highway system
- Roads in India; Expressways; National; State; Asian

RC-27 or Kirumampakkam-Bahour Road is a state highway in India. It starts from Kirumampakkam and ends at Bahour.

It is passing through the following village:

- Pinnachikuppam
