= State Highway RC-33 (Puducherry) =

Road in Puducherry, India

State Highway RC-33

Route information
- Maintained by Public Works Department (PWD), Puducherry
- Length: 1.15 km (0.71 mi)

Location
- Country: India
- Union territories: Puducherry
- Districts: Puducherry

Highway system
- Roads in India; Expressways; National; State; Asian

RC-33 or Bahour-Soriankuppam Road starts from Bahour and ends at Soriankuppam.

It is passing through the following villages:

- Kuruvinatham
