= Veerampattinam =

- Village
- Location in Puducherry, India Veerampattinam (India)
- Coordinates: 11.894389°N 79.824139°E
- Country: India
- State: Puducherry
- District: Pondicherry
- Taluk: Puducherry
- Commune: Ariyankuppam

Government
  - Type: Panchayati raj (India)
  - Body: Gram panchayat

Languages
  - Official: Tamil
  - Additional: English, French
- Time zone: UTC+5:30 (IST)
- PIN: 605 007
- Telephone code: 0413
- Vehicle registration: PY-01
- Sex ratio: 50% ♂/♀

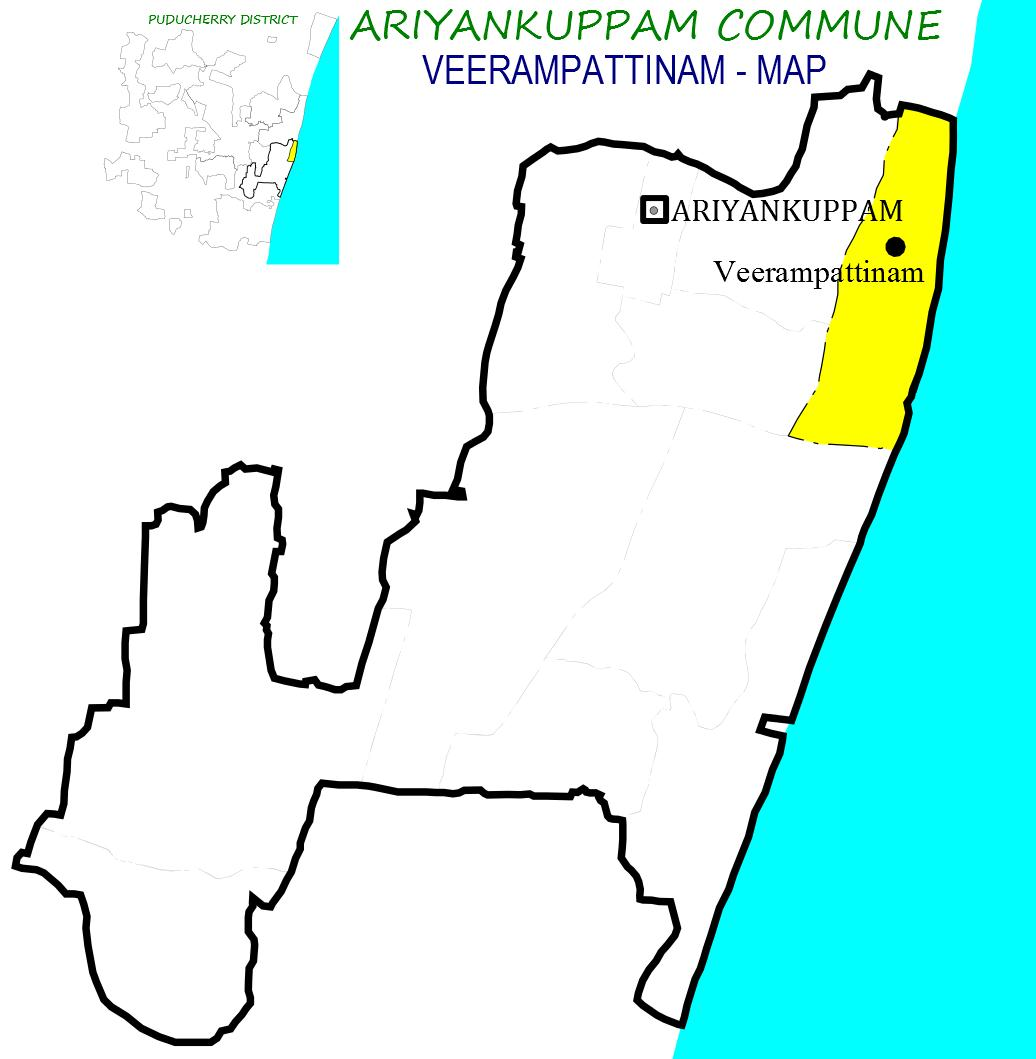
Veerampattinam Village in Ariyankuppam Commune

Veerampattinam is the largest coastal village in the union territory of Puducherry situated between Pondicherry and Cuddalore. The village is 7 km away from the Pondicherry city centre and frequent bus services are available from Pondicherry for almost once in every 10–15 minutes. The population of the village is more than 10,000.. Around 5,000 people are registered as voters with the Election Commission of India.

== Beach ==
The village has a lengthy beach which attracts tourists from local as well as abroad.

== Festivals ==
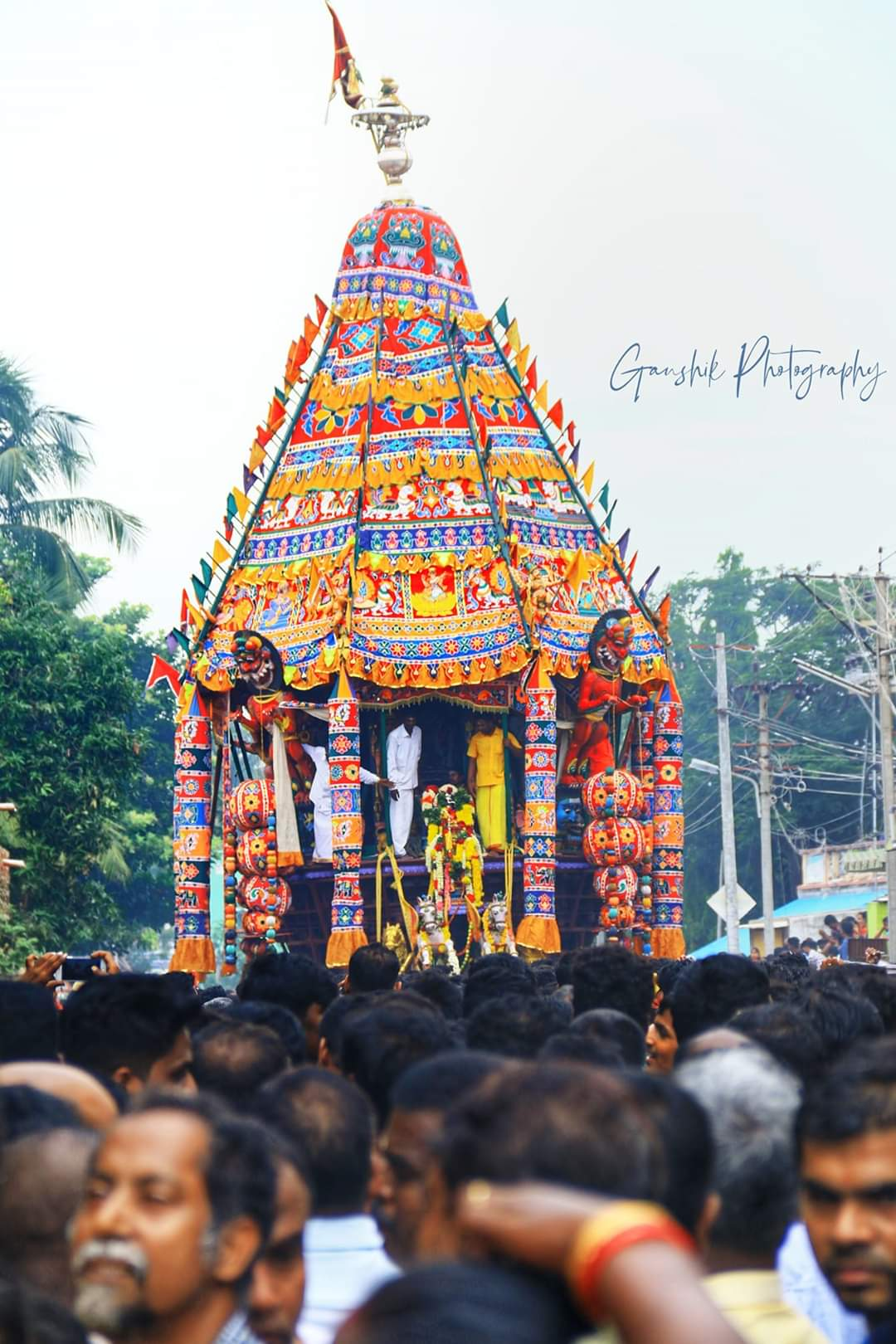
Car Festival

The village is famous for its Car Festival celebrated here on the occasion of the six weeks long village temple (Sri Sengazhuneer Amman Temple) festival since the date immemorial. It attracts thousands of people from far and near. Veerampattinam is also famous for Masi Magam (gathering of several deities in front of beach) which is held in February/March of every year.

== Education ==
There are three government schools (Primary school, Jeevarathinam Girls Middle School and Singaravelar High School) in the village. Some of the children are taking the advantage of the village schools and others are going to private schools outside the village.

== Gallery ==
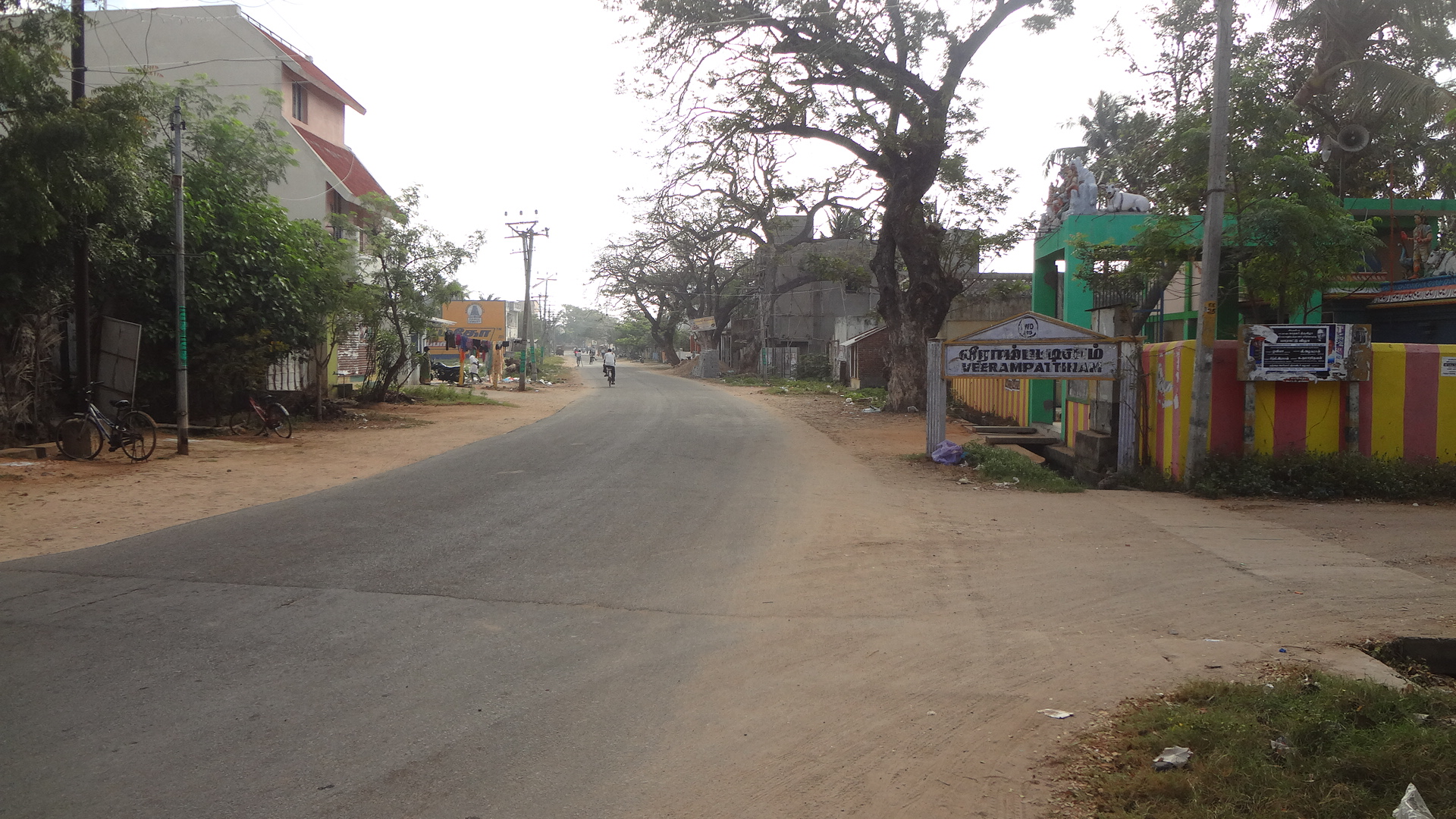
Veerampattinam entrance

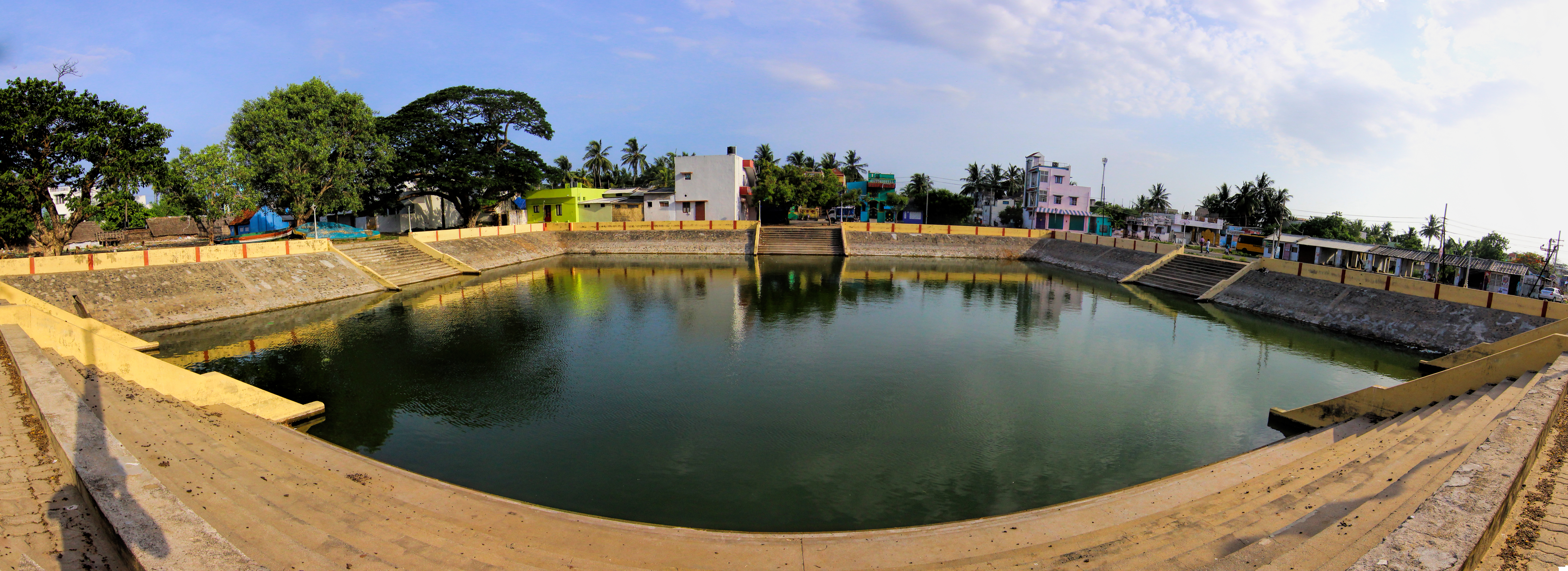
Temple pond at Veerampattinam

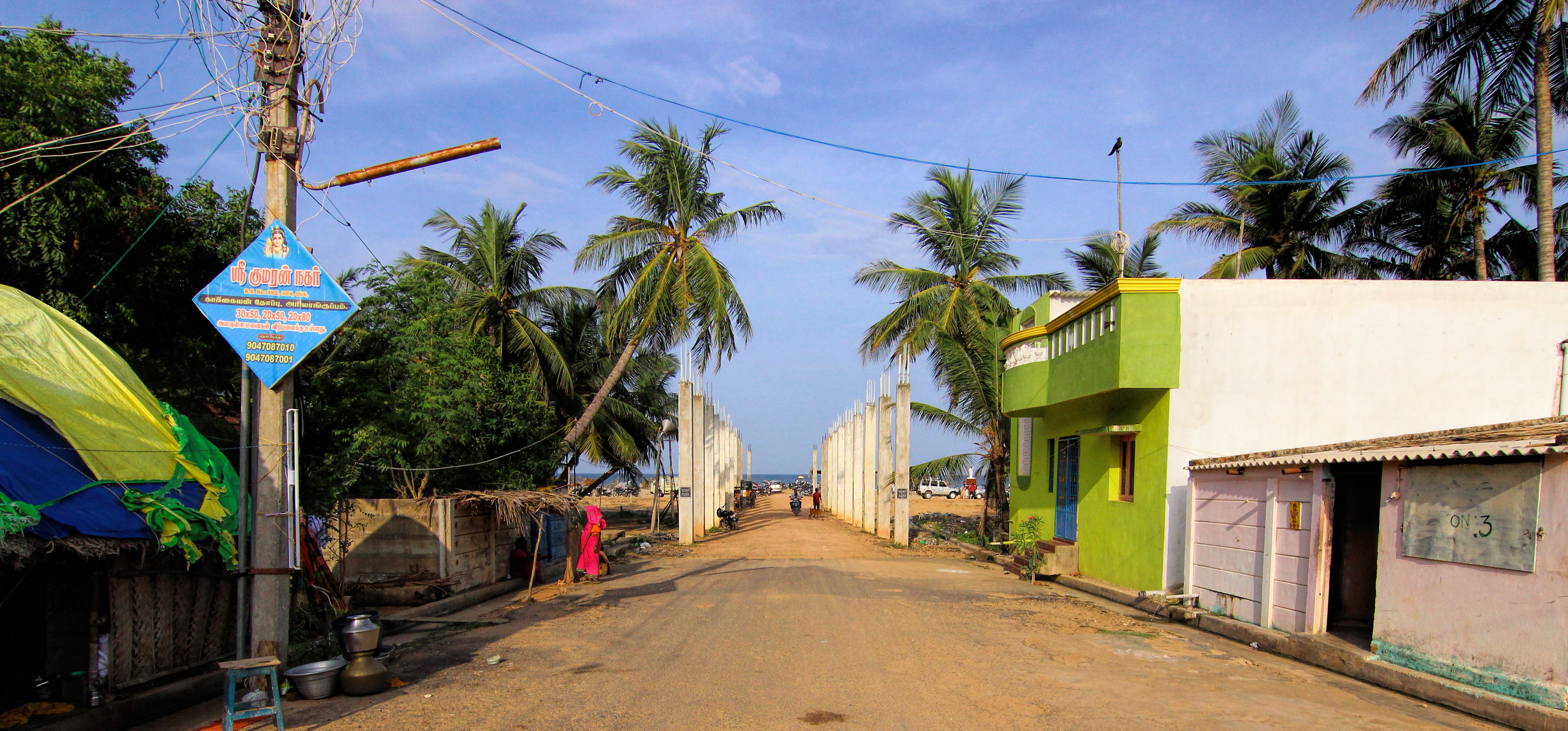
Veerampattinam beach entrance

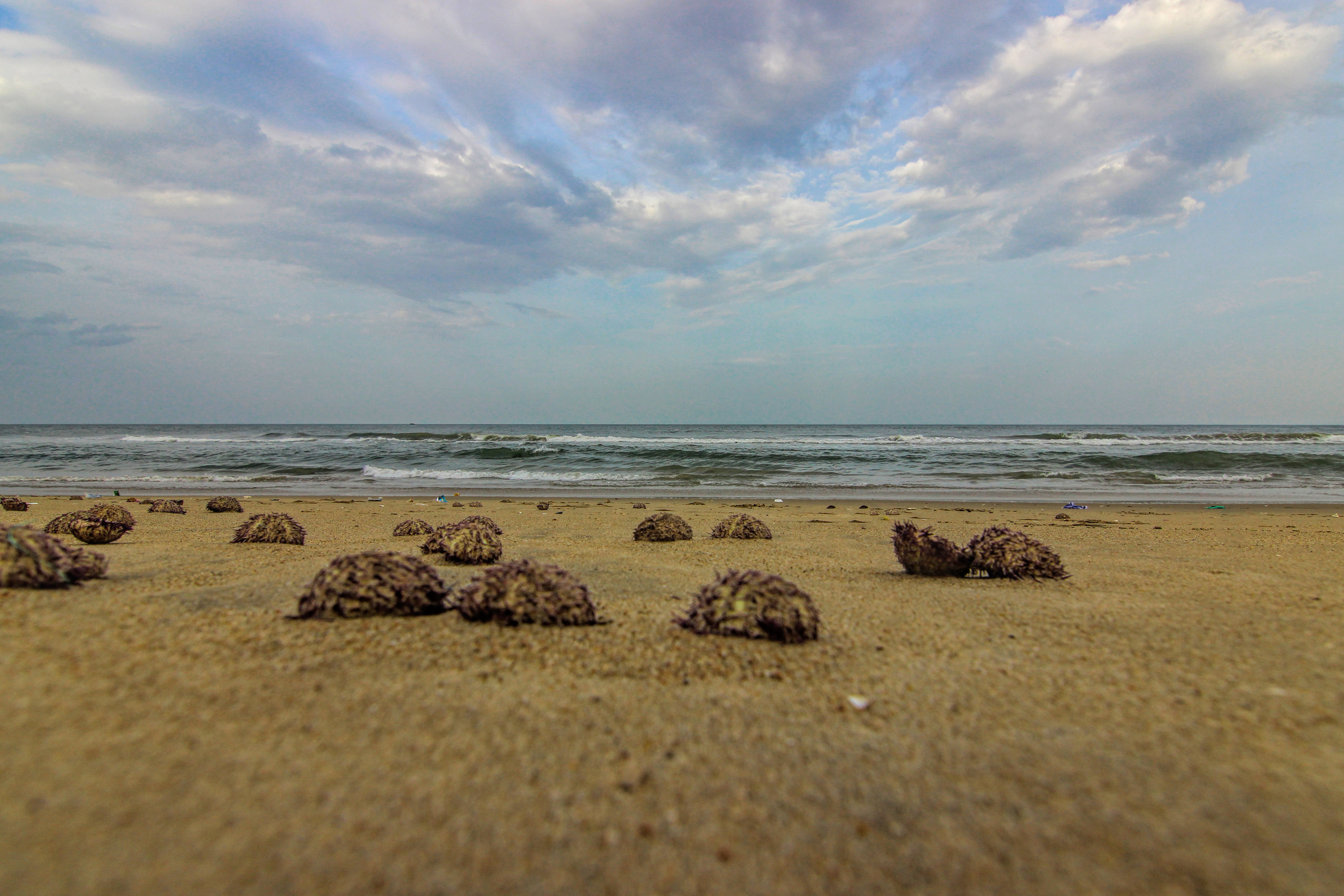
Veerampattinam beach with sea urchins

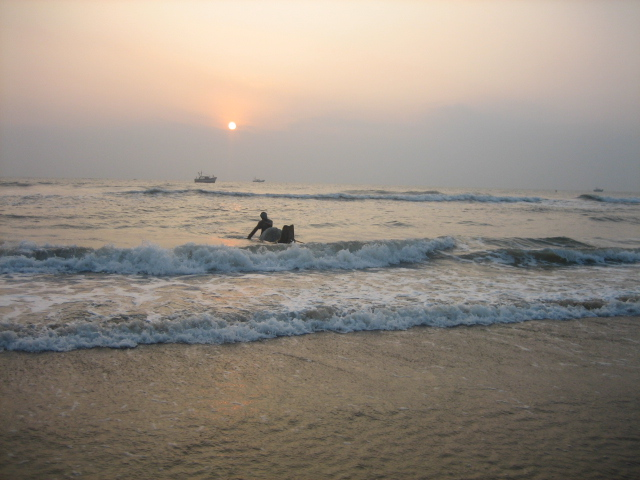
A morning scene of sea at Veerampattinam

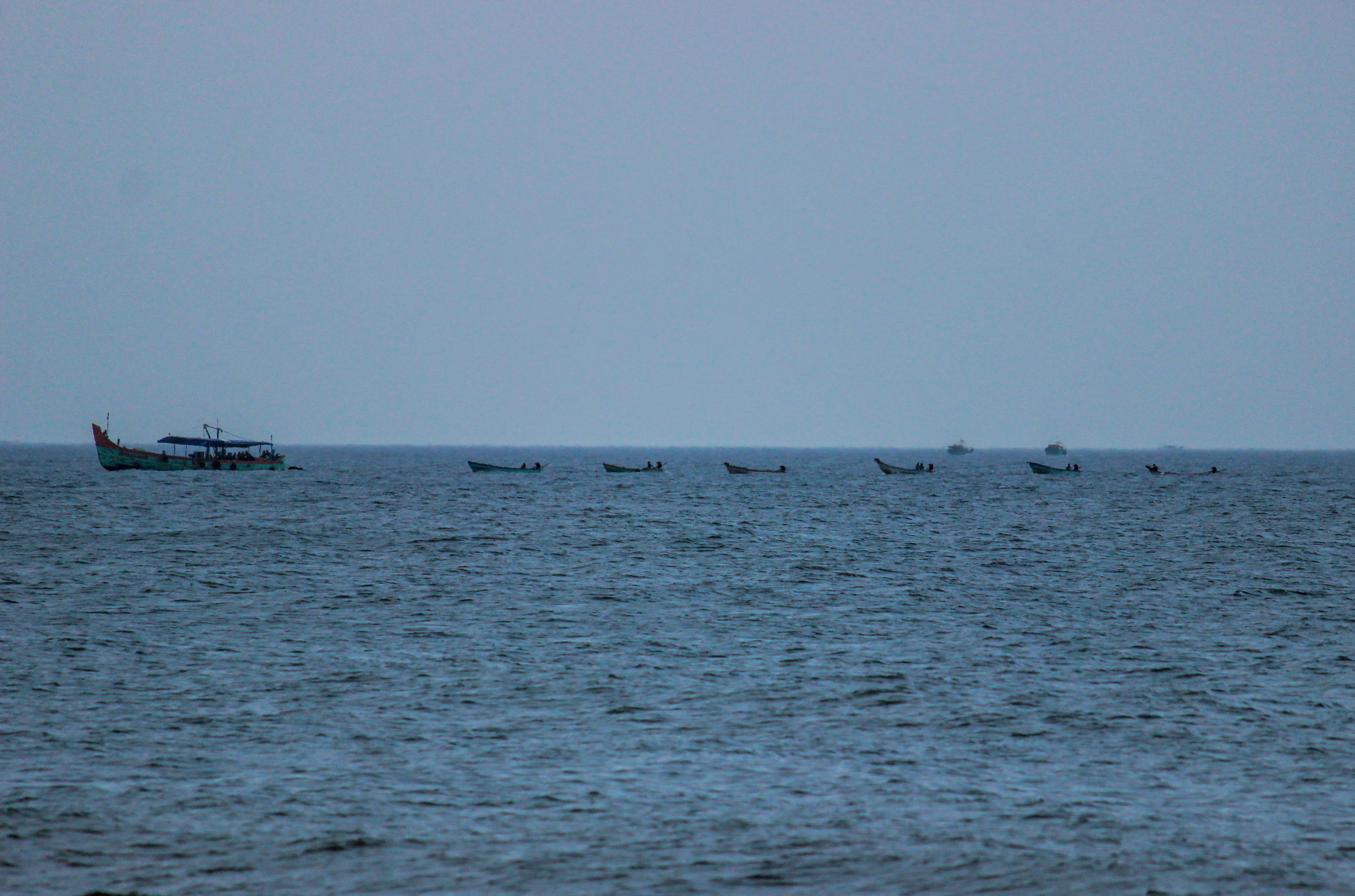
A view of fishing boats from the beach
