= State Highway RC-18 (Puducherry) =

Road in Puducherry, India

State Highway RC-18

Route information
- Maintained by Public Works Department (PWD), Puducherry
- Length: 11.415 km (7.093 mi)

Major junctions
- RC-20 at Karikalampakkam; RC-27 at Bahour; RC-28 at Bahour; RC-31 at Bahour

Location
- Country: India
- Union territories: Puducherry
- Districts: Puducherry

Highway system
- Roads in India; Expressways; National; State; Asian

RC-18 or Villianur-Bahour Road starts from Villianur and ends at Bahour Junction.

It passes through the following villages:

- Karikalampakkam
- Seliyamedu
