= State Highway RC-1 (Puducherry) =

Road in Puducherry, India

State Highway RC-1

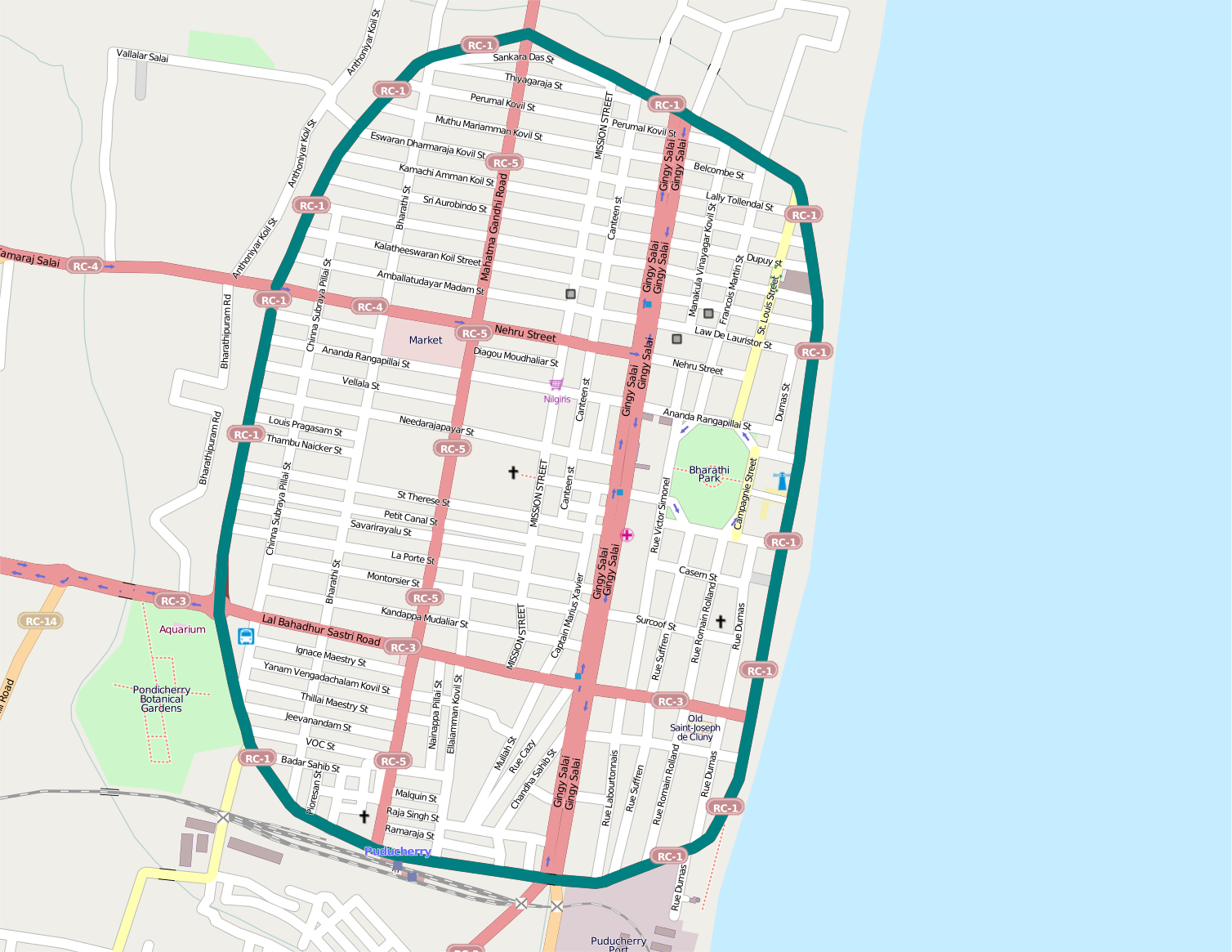

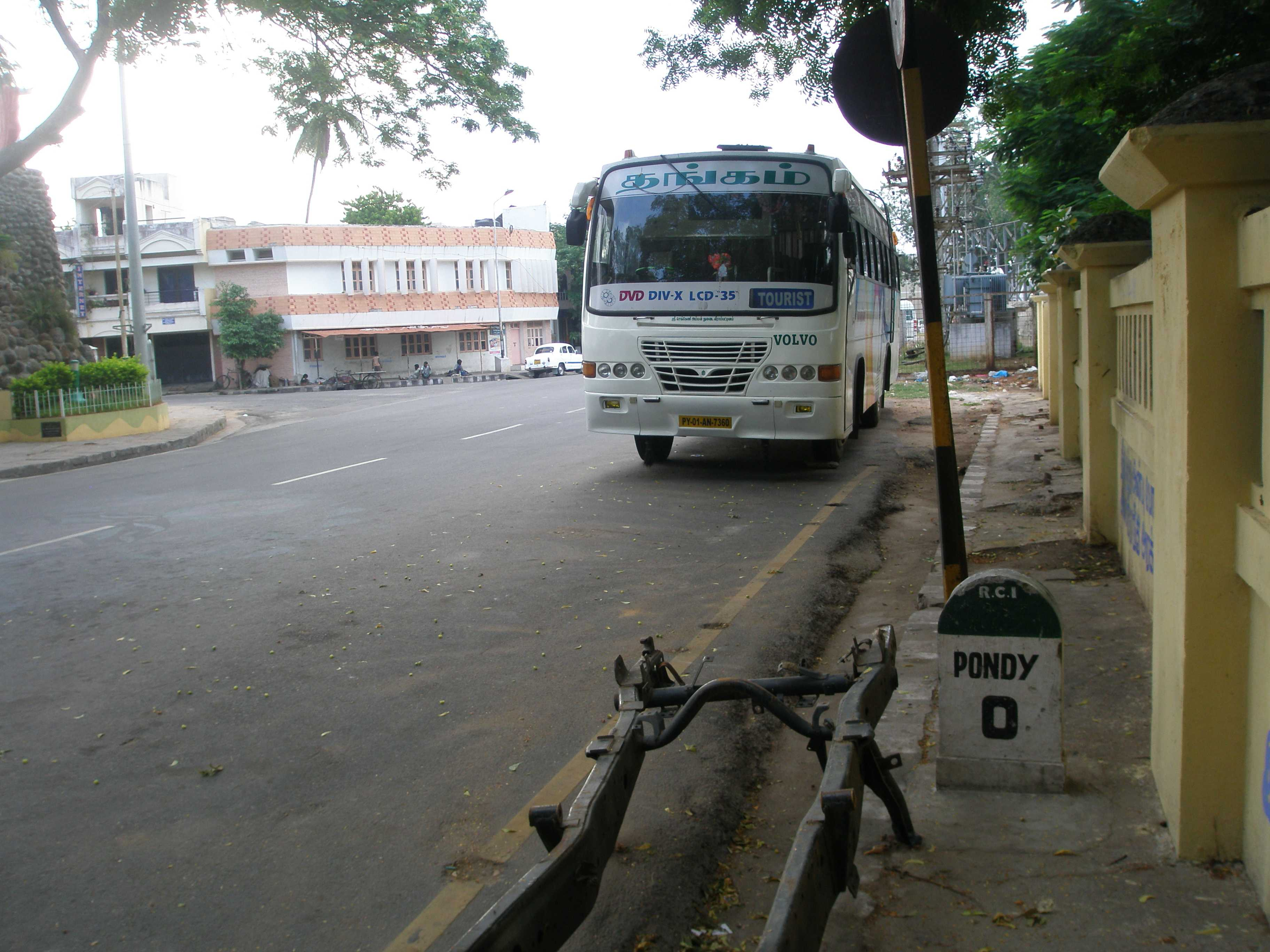
- RC-1 (Boulevard Road), Puducherry

Route information
- Maintained by Public Works Department (PWD), Puducherry
- Length: 5.29 km (3.29 mi)

Major junctions
- East end: Puducherry railway station
- RC-2 and RC-5 at South Boulevard, RC-3 and RC-4 at East Boulevard, RC-5 at North Boulevard, RC-3 and RC-4 at West Boulevard
- East end: Puducherry railway station

Location
- Country: India
- Union territories: Puducherry
- Districts: Puducherry

Highway system
- Roads in India; Expressways; National; State; Asian

RC-1 or Boulevard Roads is a state highway that forms the boundary ring of the city of Puducherry. Now it exist inside the Puducherry Municipality limits. RC-1 starts and ends at Puducherry Railway Station forming a ring.

It comparises of

- Goubert Avenue (East Boulevard)
- S V Patel Road (North Boulevard)
- Anna Salai (West Boulevard)
- Subbiah Salai (South Boulevard)

== Route ==
RC-1 starts at Puducherry Railway Station and runs eastwards as Goubert Avenue (East Boulevard) till Kargil Memorial and then turns northward as SV Patel Road (North Boulevard) till Madras Vayil (Ajantha Junction) and then turn West as Anna Salai (West Boulevard) and runs up to Anna Square. From Anna Square it turns south as Subbiah Salai (South Boulevard) to complete the ring at Puducherry Railway Station

== Landmarks ==
=== East Boulevard ===
- Puducherry Port
- Statue of Joseph François Dupleix
- Promenade
- Old Court Building
- Zeroth Point of Puducherry-Villupuram Road (RC-3)
- French War Memorial
- Puducherry Municipality
- Statue of Mahatma Gandhi
- Old Light House
- Puducherry Chief Secretariat
- Kargil Memorial

=== North Boulevard ===
- Sri Aurobindo Ashram

=== West Boulevard ===
- Pothys Shopping Mall

=== South Boulevard ===
- Botanical Garden
- Puducherry Railway Station
