= State Highway RC-31 (Puducherry) =

Road in Puducherry, India

State Highway RC-31

Route information
- Maintained by Public Works Department (PWD), Puducherry
- Length: 0.774 km (0.481 mi; 2,540 ft)

Major junctions
- RC-18 at Bahour

Location
- Country: India
- Union territories: Puducherry
- Districts: Puducherry

Highway system
- Roads in India; Expressways; National; State; Asian

RC-31 or Bahour-Karaimedu Road branches out from RC-18 at Bahour and ends at Karaimedu.
