= Kurinjipadi block =

Coordinates: 11.57°N 79.60°E

Kurinjipadi block is a revenue block of the Cuddalore District of the Indian state of Tamil Nadu. This revenue block consist of 52 panchayat villages.

== List of panchayat villages ==
SI.No	Panchayat Village
1	Adoor Agaram
2	Agaram
3	Alapakkam
4	Ambalavananpettai
5	Andar mullipallam
6	Annathanampettai
7	Anukkampattu
8	Arangamangalam
9	Athinarayanapuram
10	Ayeekuppam
11	Boothampadi
12	Kalkunam
13	Kalyankuppam
14	Kannadi
15	Karunguzhi
16	Kayalpattu
17	Keezhur
18	Kolakudi
19	Koranapattu
20	Kothandaramapuram
21	Kothavacherry
22	Krishnankuppam
23	Kundiamallur
24	Kuruvappanpettai
25	Madhanagopalapuram
26	Maruvai
27	Melapudupettai
28	Nainarkuppam
29	Petthanaikankuppam பெத்தநாயக்கன்குப்பம்
30	Poovanikuppam
31	Puliyur
32	Renganathapuram
33	Sammattikuppam
34	Sirupalaiyur
35	T.Palayam
36	Thaiyalkunampattinam
37	Thambipettai
38	Theerthanagiri
39	Thiruchopuram
40	Thiyagavalli
41	Thondamanatham
42	Vadakkumelur
43	Vadakuthu
44	Vanathirayapuram
45	Vandiyampallam
46	Varatharajanpettai
47	Vazhuthalampattu
48	Venkatampettai
49	Virupatchi
50	IndraNager
51	Permathur
52	Vellakarai
53	ponveli
