= Cuddalore block =

Coordinates: 11.75°N 79.75°E

Cuddalore block is a revenue block of Cuddalore district of the Indian state of Tamil Nadu. This revenue block consist of 51 panchayat villages.

== List of Panchayat Villages ==
They are:

SI.No	Panchayat Village
1	Azhagiyanatham
2	Annavalli
3	Arisiperiyankuppam
4	C.N.Palayam
5	Chellancheri
6	Cuddalore O.T
7	Gunamangalam
8	Gunduuppalavadi
9	Karaikadu
10	Karaimedu
11	Karaiyeravittakuppam
12	Karamanikuppam
13	Karanapattu
14	Keelmampattu
15	Kelkumaramangalam
16	Kilinjikuppam
17	Kodukkanpalayam
18	Kondur
19	Kudikadu
20	Kumalankulam
21	M.P.Agaram
22	Madalapattu
23	Maruthadu
24	Melalinjipattu
25	Naduveerapattu
26	Nallathur
27	Nanamedu
28	Nathapattu
29	Pachayankuppam
30	Pallipattu
31	Pathirikuppam
32	Periyakankanankuppam
33	Pillali
34	Pudukadai
35	Ramapuram
36	Sedapalayam
37	Semmankuppam
38	Singirikudi
39	Thennampakkam
40	Thirumanikuzhi
41	Thirupanampakkam
42	Thiruvanthipuram
43	Thookkanampakkam
44	Thottapattu
45	Uchimedu
46	Ulleripattu
47	Vanamadevi
48	Varakalpattu
49	Vellakarai
50	Vellapakkam
51	Vilangalpattu
