= Kalaiyur =

- Village
- Location in Tamil Nadu, India Kalaiyur (India)
- Coordinates: 11.7294°N 79.6650°E
- Country: India
- State: Tamil Nadu
- District: Cuddalore
- Taluk: Cuddalore
- Block: Cuddalore

Languages
  - Official: Tamil
- Time zone: UTC+5:30 (IST)
- PIN: 607402
- Vehicle registration: TN-31

Kalaiyur is a revenue village in Cuddalore district, state of Tamil Nadu, India.

Kalaiyur is known as the Village of Cooks. The village was featured in History TV18's show OMG! Yeh Mera India - Season 2, hosted by Krishna Abhishek.
