= Andarmullipallam =

- Village
- Location in Tamil Nadu, India Andarmullipallam (India)
- Coordinates: 11.5832°N 79.7250°E
- Country: India
- State: Tamil Nadu
- District: Cuddalore
- Taluk: Cuddalore
- Block: Cuddalore

Languages
  - Official: Tamil
- Time zone: UTC+5:30 (IST)
- Vehicle registration: TN-31

Andarmullipallam is a revenue village in Cuddalore district, state of Tamil Nadu, India.
