= Nallathur =

- Village
- Location in Tamil Nadu, India Nallathur (India)
- Coordinates: 11.8722331°N 79.7021627°E
- Country: India
- State: Tamil Nadu
- District: Cuddalore
- Taluk: Cuddalore
- Block: Cuddalore

Population (2001)
  - Total: 3,853

Languages
  - Official: Tamil, English
- Time zone: UTC+5:30 (IST)
- PIN: 605 106
- Vehicle registration: TN-31
- Sex ratio: 50% ♂/♀

Nallathur is a village in the Cuddalore district of Tamil Nadu. Nallathur's postal code is 605106.

== Demographics ==
According to the 2011 Indian census, the population of Nallathur was 4,456, of which 2,238 were male (50.02%) and 2,218 were female (49.98%). 495 (11.1%) of them were aged six or under. The literacy rate was 68.6% (3,057 literate); 75% of males and 61.7% of females were literate. 51.7% of the population was employed (63.7% male, 39.5% female). Scheduled castes made up 26.4% of the population. There were no people from scheduled tribes.

== Nearby towns and villages ==
Nallathur is located 145 km (90 mi) south of Chennai, the capital of Tamil Nadu and 14.3 km (8.9 mi) northwest from Cuddalore in the Taluk township. Other nearby towns include Pondicherry: 16 km (9.9 mi), Panruti: 20.1 km (12.5 mi) and Villupuram: 25 km (16 mi). Nallathur is surrounded by villages of Puducherry on three sides: Embalam (East), Manakuppam (West), and Sivaranthagam (North). The Malattaru borders the southern part of the village. Two nearby villages Melakuppam and N.Manaveli are under the Nallathur Panchayat.

== Climate ==
The temperature is moderate; the average maximum and minimum temperatures are 38 °C (100 °F) and 21 °C (70 °F) respectively. The town gets its rainfall from the northeast monsoon in winter and the southwest monsoon in summer. The average annual rainfall is 1,070 mm (42 in).

== Temples ==
Nallathur is also known as "Temple village" and the place of Sivaprakasa Swamigal Jeeva samadhi.

- Sri Swarnapureeswarar Temple is a temple of Shiva in Nallathur.
- Sri Lakshmi Narayana Varadharaja Perumal Koil
- Thuraimangalam Siva Prakasar Jeeva Samadhi Aalayam
- Sri Arni Periyapalayathu Amman Temple
- Sri Draupathi Amman Dharma Raja Temple
- Sri Kali Amman Temple
- Sri Selva Vinayagar Temple
- Sri Naga Muthumari Amman Temple
- Sri Muthu Mariyamman Temple
- Sri Gangai Amman Temple

== Colleges ==
- Sri Venkateshwara Medical college Hospital and Research Centre, Ariyur, Pondicherry: 5 km (3.1 mi)
- Sri Manakula Vinayagar Medical College and Hospital, Madagadipet, Pondicherry: 12 km (7.5 mi)
- Aarupadai Veedu Medical College and Hospital, Kirumbampakkam, Pondicherry: 13 km (8.1 mi)
- Mahatma Gandhi Medical College and Research Institute, Pillaiyarkuppam, Pondicherry: 15 km (9.3 mi)
- Sri Manakula Vinayagar Engineering College, Madagadipet, Pondicherry: 12 km (7.5 mi)
- Manakula Vinayagar Institute of Technology, Kalitheerthalkuppam, Pondicherry: 12 km (7.5 mi)
- Sri Jayaram Engineering College
- IFET College of Engineering, Villupuram District: 14 km (8.7 mi)

== Schools ==
- Appar Government Aided Middle School, Nallathur
- Swami vivekananda High School, Manakuppam: 500 m (0.31 mi)
- Maraimalai Adigal Government Higher Secondary School, Embalam: 1 km (0.62 mi)
- Government Higher Secondary School, Thookanampakkam: 3 km (1.9 mi)
- St. Joseph’s Higher Secondary School, Manjakuppam Cuddalore
- Vallalar Government Higher Secondary School, Kandamangalam: 6 km (3.7 mi)
- Balaji English Higher Secondary School, Embalam: 2 km (1.2 mi),
- Government High School Pakkam: 4 km (2.5 mi)
- Gps, manakuppam 500m

== Economy ==
Nallathur's main activity is agriculture. Rice paddy and sugarcane cultivation are prevalent.
