= Ramapuram, Cuddalore =

Ramapuram Ramapuam
- Village
- Location in Tamil Nadu, India Ramapuram (India)
- Coordinates: 11.6954°N 79.7032°E
- Country: India
- State: Tamil Nadu
- District: Cuddalore
- Taluk: Cuddalore
- Block: Cuddalore

Population (2001)
  - Total: 3,853

Languages
  - Official: Tamil, English
- Time zone: UTC+5:30 (IST)
- Vehicle registration: TN-31
- Sex ratio: 50% ?/?

Ramapuram is a revenue village in Cuddalore district in state of Tamil Nadu, India.

== Ramapuram ==
- Official Web Site of Cuddalore District
