= Thirumanikuzhi =

Thirumanikuzhi Thirumaanikuzhi
- Village
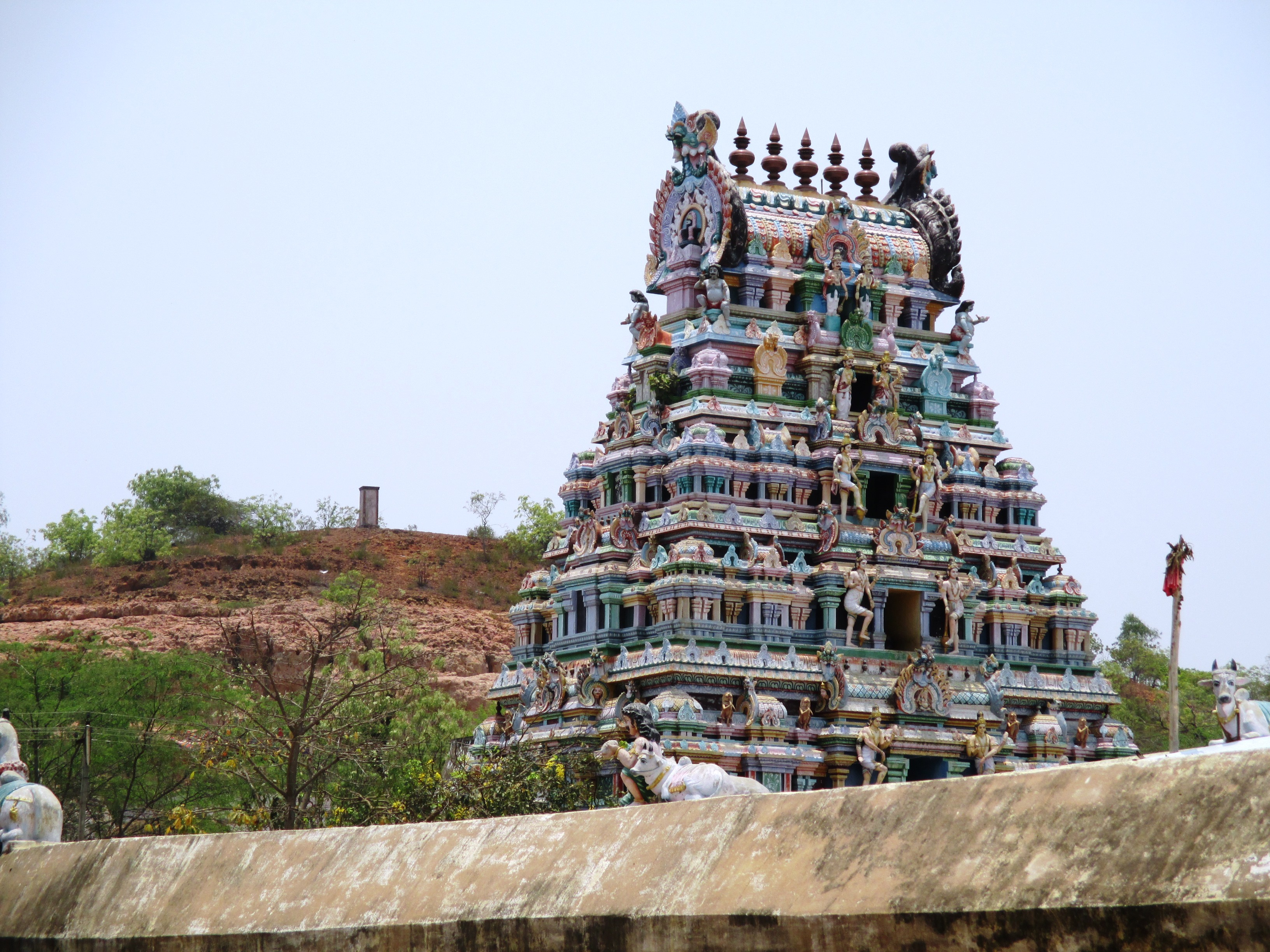

- Location in Tamil Nadu, India Thirumanikuzhi (India)
- Coordinates: 11.7372°N 79.6836°E
- Country: India
- State: Tamil Nadu
- District: Cuddalore
- Taluk: Cuddalore
- Block: Cuddalore

Languages
  - Official: Tamil
- Time zone: UTC+5:30 (IST)
- Vehicle registration: TN-31

Thirumanikuzhi or Thirumaanikuzhi is a revenue village in Cuddalore district, state of Tamil Nadu, India. The village history is built around the Vamaneeswarar temple located in the village.
