= Naduveerapattu =

- Village
- Nickname: Naduvirappattu
- Location in Tamil Nadu, India Naduveerapattu (India)
- Coordinates: 11.72653°N 79.6398°E
- Country: India
- State: Tamil Nadu
- District: Cuddalore
- Taluk: Cuddalore
- Block: Cuddalore

Government
  - Type: panchayat

Population (2001)
  - Total: 3,853

Languages
  - Official: Tamil, English
- Time zone: UTC+5:30 (IST)
- PIN: 607102
- Vehicle registration: TN-31
- Sex ratio: 50% ♂/♀

Naduveerappattu is a revenue village in Cuddalore district in state of Tamil Nadu, India.
