= Gunthanala =

- Revenue Village
- Interactive map of Gunthanala
- Location in Andhra Pradesh, India Gunthanala (India)
- Coordinates: 15.3812°N 78.3778°E
- Country: India
- State: Andhra Pradesh
- District: Nandyal
- Mandal: Nandyal Rural
- Elevation: 151 m (495 ft)

Population (2011)
  - Total: 935

Languages
  - Official: Telugu
- Time zone: UTC+5:30 (IST)
- PIN: 518593
- Vehicle registration: AP 21
- Climate: 20 to 43 (Köppen)

Gunthanala is a village in Nandyal Rural mandal, Nandyal district of the Indian state of Andhra Pradesh. It is located in Nandyal mandal.
