= Thiruvanthipuram =

- Town
- Location in Tamil Nadu, India Thiruvanthipuram (India)
- Coordinates: 11.747°N 79.711°E
- Country: India
- State: Tamil Nadu
- District: Cuddalore
- Taluk: Cuddalore
- Block: Cuddalore

Government
  - Type: Second Grade Municipality

Languages
  - Official: Tamil
- Time zone: UTC+5:30 (IST)
- Vehicle registration: TN-31

Thiruvanthipuram is a revenue village in Cuddalore district of Tamil Nadu, India.

Devanatha Hemabhujavalli Temple is one of the 108 Divya Desams. The presiding deities are Lord Devanatha and Lordess Hemambujavalli. This temple is considered to be a viable alternative to Tirupati for those who can't make it and can make their offerings here, as Lord Devanathasvami is said to be the same as Lord Venkateshvara. Many Hindus' family deity is Lord Devanathasvami. The tonsuring and ear-boring ceremonies for kids in the families stage at the courtyard of Goddess Hemabhujavalli. There is also a hill temple dedicated to God Hayagriva, the ninth incarnation of Vishnu. Many people reach here to perform Aksharabhyasam (the ceremony conducted for commencing education of a child).

Sri Vaishnava Guru Vedanta Desika reached here as a human incarnation of Devanathasvami's Ghanta (bell) who would attain fulfilment in his penance carried out on the Hill. When he was about 20 years old and had mastered all Sastras, he came to this place, worshipped Sri Hayagriva at the hill, prayed Garuda who appeared before him and initiated him in Hayagriva Upasana which helped Desika attain religious knowledge to its greatest depths. Swami Desikan spent nearly 40 years of his life in this Divya Desam. To this day, the house in which he lived (Desikan Thirumaaligai) can be visited when one comes to Thiruvanthipuram.
