= Pallipattu, Cuddalore =

Pallipattu
- Village
- Location in Tamil Nadu, India Pallipattu (India)
- Coordinates: 11.8391°N 79.7113°E
- Country: India
- State: Tamil Nadu
- District: Cuddalore
- Taluk: Cuddalore
- Block: Cuddalore

Languages
  - Official: Tamil
- Time zone: UTC+5:30 (IST)
- PIN: 607402
- Telephone code: 0413
- Vehicle registration: TN-31

Pallipattu is one of the revenue village in Cuddalore district of Indian state, Tamil Nadu.
