= Thennampakkam =

- Village
- Location in Tamil Nadu, India Thennampakkam (India)
- Coordinates: 11.8530°N 79.7157°E
- Country: India
- State: Tamil Nadu
- District: Cuddalore
- Taluk: Cuddalore
- Block: Cuddalore

Languages
  - Official: Tamil, English
- Time zone: UTC+5:30 (IST)
- Vehicle registration: TN-31

Thennampakkam is a revenue village in Cuddalore district in state of Tamil Nadu, India.
