= List of educational institutions in Puducherry =

This is a list of educational establishments in the Union Territory of Puducherry in India.

== Universities ==
- Pondicherry University
- Puducherry Technological University

== Colleges ==
- Aarupadai Veedu Medical College
- Achariya College of Engineering & Technology
- Alpha College of Engineering and Technology
- Bharathidasan Government College for Women
- Bharathiyar College of Engineering and Technology, Karaikal
- Bharathiar Palkalaikoodam, Ariyankuppam, Puducherry.
- Christ College of Engineering and Technology, Pitchaveeranpet, Puducherry
- Christ Institute of Technology (CIT), Ramanathapuram, Puducherry
- Ganesh College of Engineering and Technology
- Indira Gandhi Institute of Dental Sciences
- Indira Gandhi Medical College and Research Institute
- Jawaharlal Institute of Postgraduate Medical Education and Research
- Kasturba College for Women, Villianur
- Mahatma Gandhi Government Arts College, Mahé
- Mahatma Gandhi Medical College and Research Institute
- Mahatma Gandhi Postgraduate Institute of Dental Sciences
- Mahé Co-operative College for Higher Studies and Education
- Manakula Vinayagar Institute of Technology
- National Institute of Technology, Puducherry
- Orient Flight School
- Perunthalaivar Kamarajar Institute of Engineering and Technology
- Pondicherry Engineering College
- Pondicherry Institute of Medical Sciences
- Raak College of Engineering and Technology
- Rajiv Gandhi College of Engineering and Technology
- Rajiv Gandhi College of Veterinary and Animal Sciences
- Regency Institute of Technology
- RVS engineering College
- Saradha Gangadharan College
- Shree Sathguru Engg. College
- Shri Krishnaa College of Engineering & Technology
- Sri Aurobindo International Centre of Education
- Sri Ganesh College of Engineering & Technology
- Sri Lakshmi Narayana Institute of Medical Sciences
- Sri Manakula Vinayagar Engineering College
- Sri Manakula Vinayagar Medical College & Hospital
- Sri Venkateshwaraa College of Engineering and Technology
- Sri Venkateshwaraa Medical College Hospital and Research Centre
- Tagore Government College of Arts and Science
- University College of Engineering
- Vinayaka Missions Medical College

== High schools ==
The following high schools are situated in the Union Territory of Puducherry:

- Aadavaa Vidyaa Mandir
- Amala Higher Secondary School
- Appu English High School
- Balar Vidyalaya High School
- Bhagvan Sri Ramakrishna English High School
- Bharatha Devi English High School
- Bharath English High School
- Bharathi English Middle School
- Bharathidhasan English High School
- Deepa Oli High School (A)
- Ever Green English High School
- Gandhi English High School
- Holy Angels High School
- Ideal Matric School, Villianur
- Immaculate Heart of Mary's Girl's High School (A)
- Immaculate Heart of Mary's High School (A)
- Jawahar High School
- Jayarani English Middle School
- Jayarani High School (A)
- K.K.Sherwood Matri High School
- Kalaimagal English School
- Kavi Bharthi High School
- Little Flower High School
- Little Star English High School
- Institut Français de Pondichéry
- Lycée français de Pondichéry (French international school)
- Malar English School
- Mother Theresa High School
- Mother Theresa, Thillai Maistry St.
- Muthurathina Arangam Matric School
- National English High School
- New Land English High School
- Our Lady of Lourdes Boys High School (A)
- Our Lady of Victory English High School
- Pavendar High School
- Perunthalaivar Kamaraj High School
- Petit Seminaire Higher Secondary School
- Presidency High School
- Primrose School, (ICSE School)
- Queen Mary's English School
- Rakk International School
- S.S.B.A. English School
- Sabari Vidhyasharam High School
- Sacred Heart of Jesus High School (A)
- Santha Clara Convent School
- Santhamani English High School
- Saradha Vidhyala English School
- Sigma English High School
- Societe Progressiste High School (A)
- Sree Hari International School
- Sree Saibaba High School
- Sri Navadurga English High School
- Sri Rabindranath Tagore English High School
- Sri Ramachandra Vidyalaya High School
- Sri Ramachandra Vidyalaya Matri School
- Sri Ramakrishna Paramahamsa English High School
- Sri Saimatha English High School
- Sri Sampoorna Vidyalaya High School
- Sri Saraswathi English School
- Sri Saraswathy Vidyalaya, High School
- Sri Shakthi High School, PonNagar
- Sri Sithanandha High School
- St. Ann's High School (A)
- St. Antony's High School (A)
- St. Francis Assisi High School (A)
- St. Joseph High School (A)
- St. Joseph's High School (A)
- St. Louis De Gonzague High School (A)
- St. Patrick Matriculation Higher Secondary School
- St. Peter's English High School
- St. Thomas High School
- The Study Middle School
- Subiksha English school
- Subramania Bharathi High School
- Sudha English High School
- Swami Vivekananda Vidyalaya, High School
- TAS English High School
- Valluvar High School (A)
- Vidhya Niketan High School
- Vruksha International School of Montessori
