= Subash Gupta =

Indian surgeon

Prof (Dr.) Subhash Gupta
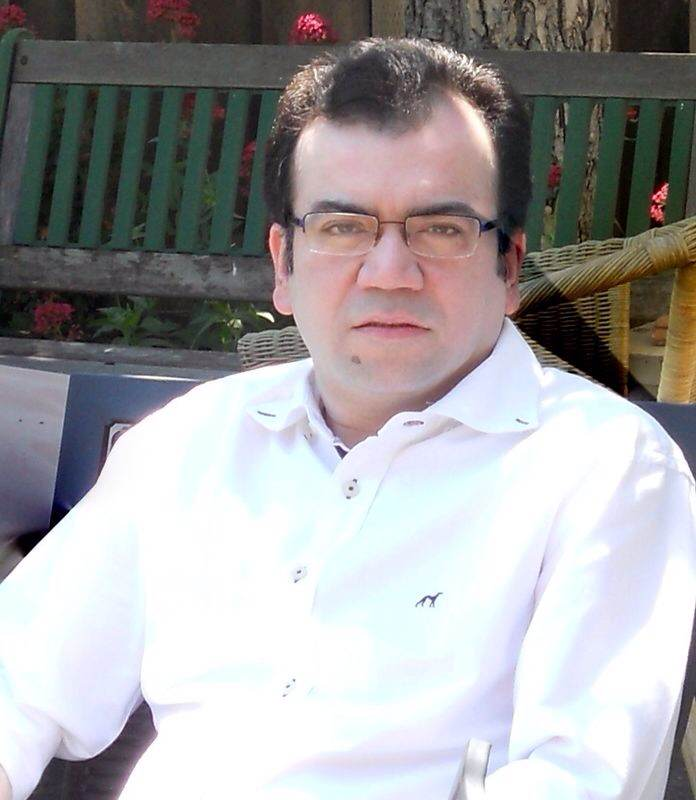
- Born: 12 June 1963 (age 63)
- Education: All India Institute of Medical Sciences; Fellowship of the Royal College of Surgeons; University of Queensland
- Awards: Delhi Medical Council, gold medal, 2005; Rotary Club: Distinguished Clinician Award, 2011; Vishist Chikitsak Rattan, 2012
- Scientific career
- Fields: Medical science
- Website: Official Website

Subhash Gupta is an Indian hepatobiliary-pancreatic surgeon and the chairman of the Max Center of Liver and Biliary Science at Max Healthcare, Saket.

== Professional career ==
Gupta is known for his work in liver transplantation in the Indian subcontinent. He and his team successfully conducted over 2500 liver transplants in 15 years, of which 300 were in 2013.

Gupta joined Sir Ganga Ram Hospital in 1998 and set up liver transplantation operations there along with Dr. Shantanu Nundy. The department conducted the first liver transplant in 2001, using a deceased donor liver. Along with Nundy, he began performing live donor transplants as the predominant form of liver transplantation. The liver transplantation program completed 66 transplants in 2006.

== Academic career ==
Gupta completed his undergraduate degree and master's in General surgery from the All India Institute of Medical Sciences, New Delhi. In 1989, he specialized in surgical gastroenterology. In 1993, he moved to England to work and train under Dr. Paul McMaster in the liver unit at Queen Elizabeth Hospital in Birmingham.

In February 1995, he moved to the Department of Organ Transplantation at St James's University Hospital in Leeds, where he later worked as a locum consultant.

During his stay in the UK, Gupta qualified for Fellowship of the Royal College of Surgeons of Edinburgh and of Glasgow. He has published extensively on different aspects of living donor liver transplantation, such as liver transplantation without hepatitis B immunoglobulin prophylaxis and appropriate cytomegalovirus prophylaxis.

He is an associate professor in Surgery at the University of Queensland, Australia. The Institute of Postgraduate Education and Medical Research in Kolkata made him Professor of Liver Transplantation. He delivered the annual oration at the JIPMER Scientific Society in Puducherry in 2011 and was a recipient of a Gold Medal by the Delhi Medical Association in 2005. He is also on the Board of Management of Mahatma Gandhi Medical College, Mumbai, as a central government nominee.

With the help of the Federation of Indian Chambers of Commerce and Industry (FICCI) and the Ministry of Health, he led the team to develop standard guidelines for the treatment of liver diseases and liver transplantation in India.

== Publications and lectures ==
He has published over 100 papers on surgery and transplantation, along with significant contributions to numerous books in his field. He has focused his clinical and research activities on the medical management of patients with liver diseases. Publications include:

- Wadhawan, M; Gupta, S; Goyal, N; Vasudevan, K; Makki, K; Dawar, R; Sardana, R; Lal, N; Kumar, A (2012) "CMV infection: incidence and management in CMV seropositive living related liver transplant (LRLT) recipients: a single center experience". Liver Transpl. 18 (12): 1448–55. doi:10.1002/lt.23540. PMID 22903934.
- Kaur, S; Sharma, D; Wadhwa, N; Gupta, S; Chowdhary, SK; Sibal, A (February 2012). "Therapeutic interventions in progressive familial intrahepatic cholestasis: experience from a tertiary care center in north India". Indian J Pediatr. 79 (2): 270–3. doi:10.1007/s12098-011-0516-8. PMID 21769524. S2CID 11770503.
- Gupta, S.; Singhal, A.; Goyal, N.; Vij, V.; Wadhawan, M. (April 2011). "Portal biliopathy treated with living-donor liver transplant: index case". Exp Clin Transplant. 9 (2): 145–9. PMID 21453234.
- Wadhawan, M.; Rastogi, M.; Gupta, S.; and Kumar, A. (2010). "Peritransplant management of chronic hepatitis C.". Trop Gastroenterol. 31 (2): 75–81. PMID 20862979.
- Singhal, A; Varma, M; Goyal, N; Vij, V; Wadhawan, M; Gupta, S (December 2009). "Peroneal neuropathy following liver transplantation: possible predisposing factors and outcome". Exp Clin Transplant. 7 (4): 252–5. PMID 20353377.
- Varma, V; Gupta, S; Soin, AS; Nundy, S (2009) "Does the presence of jaundice and/or a lump in a patient with gall bladder cancer mean that the lesion is not resectable?". Dig. Surg. 26 (4): 306–11. doi:10.1159/000231880. PMID 19657192. S2CID 22345979.
- Kohli, V.; Wadhawan, M.; Gupta, S.; and Roy, V. (February 2010). "Posttransplant complex inferior venacava balloon dilatation after hepatic vein stenting". Cardiovasc Intervent Radiol. 33 (1): 205–8. doi:10.1007/s00270-009-9633-4. PMID 19629592. S2CID 1576707.
- Singhal, A.; Srivastava, A.; Goyal, N.; Vij, V.; Wadhawan, M.; Bera, M.; Gupta, S. (Dec. 2009). "Successful living donor liver transplant in a child with Abernethy malformation with biliary atresia, ventricular septal defect, and intrapulmonary shunting". Pediatr Transplant. 13 (8): 1041–7. doi:10.1111/j.1399-3046.2009.01092.x. PMID 19254272. S2CID 7330091.
- Marwah, S.; Khan, MM; Chaudhary, A.; Gupta, S.; Negi, SS; Soin, A.; Nundy, S. (2007). "Two hundred and forty-one consecutive liver resections: an experience from India". HPB (Oxford). 9 (1): 29–36. doi:10.1080/13651820600985259. PMC 2020779. PMID 18333110.
- Singhal, D.; Goyal, N.; Gupta, S.; Nundy, S. (2007). "Surgery for obscure lower gastrointestinal bleeding in India". Dig Dis Sci. 52 (1): 282–6. doi:10.1007/s10620-006-9190-5. PMID 17151809. S2CID 25548046.
- Prasad, AS; Gupta, S; Kohli, V; Pande, GK; Sahni, P; Nundy, S (February 1994). "Proximal splenorenal shunts for extrahepatic portal venous obstruction in children". Ann Surg. 219 (2): 193–6. doi:10.1097/00000658-199402000-00011. PMC 1243121. PMID 8129490.
- Sharma, L.; Gupta, S.; Soin, AS; Sikora, S.; Kapoor, V. (May 1991). "Generalized peritonitis in India—the tropical spectrum". Jpn J Surg. 21 (3): 272–7. doi:10.1007/bf02470946. PMID 1857032. S2CID 5678777.
