= Solla Marandha Kathai =

- Poster
- Directed by: Thankar Bachan
- Screenplay by: Thankar Bachan
- Based on: Thalaikeezh Vigithangal by Nanjil Nadan
- Produced by: Meena Panju Arunchalam
- Starring: Cheran; Rathi
- Cinematography: Thangar Bachan
- Edited by: K. R. Gowrishankar
- Music by: Ilaiyaraaja
- Production company: P. A. Art Productions
- Distributed by: Chandra Sekar
- Release date: 4 November 2002
- Country: India
- Language: Tamil

Solla Marandha Kathai (transl. The story that was forgotten to be told) is a 2002 Indian Tamil-language drama film written and directed by Thankar Bachan. The film stars Cheran and Rathi. It is based on Nanjil Nadan's novel Thalaikeezh Vigithangal. The film was released on 4 November 2002.

== Plot ==
In Thiyagavalli, Sivadhanu is an unemployed post-graduate and is the eldest son of a poor family. He has the responsibility of marrying his sister Lakshmi and taking care of his two younger brothers. Once, Chokkalingam, a rich businessman in Mayavaram notices Sivadhanu at the market while waiting for Chidambaram Mudhaliar. Impressed with his genuineness and enthusiasm, he inquires Mudhaliar about Sivadhanu. Though being rich he approaches Sivadhanu's family to marry Sivadhanu to his elder daughter Parvathi and make the son-in-law look after his businesses. Though Sivadhanu does not like the idea of living in Chokkalingam's house after marriage, Mudhaliar convinces Sivadhanu and his family, that his father-in-law is capable of fetching him a job.

Soon after moving into Chokkalingam's house, Sivadhanu feels he is treated as a manservant, his independence is lost, and is made to look after the restaurant of Chokkalingam unwillingly. One day his friend Panneer stumbles upon him and sees Sivadhanu being publicly insulted by Chokkalingam for his decisions. Panneer remarks that the poor should never be married to a rich bride and live at their father-in-law's place because the in-laws will always treat them as inferiors. Sivadhanu also learns that his father-in-law has advised one of his close relatives, P. D. Elangovan MP not to recommend for any government jobs for which Sivadhanu had requested him earlier. When Sivadhanu's brother visits him to inform him about Lakshmi's prospective groom, Sivadhanu's in-laws insult him for their poverty, which Sivadhanu overhears. Unable to bear his brother's humiliation, Sivadhanu returns to his home without telling anyone but is again convinced by Mudhaliar to return to his in-laws' house. Sivadhanu calms Parvathi for leaving her uninformed but is overjoyed to know that an appointment letter from NLC as a geologist has arrived. Despite Chokkalingam's resistance Sivadhanu leaves alone to join the job.

In a few months, Parvathi becomes pregnant while Sivadhanu arranges for Lakshmi's marriage. For that, when Sivadhanu tries to take Parvathi to his home a couple of days before the wedding, her parents refuse to send her citing health reasons. Unreachable and hectic at work, a situation arises where he cannot even visit Parvathi during her delivery, and a girl child is born. After making adequate arrangements in the staff quarters, Sivadhanu asks Parvathi to accompany him to Neyveli, but she again refuses, which annoys him. Seeing Sivadhanu angry with Parvathi, Chokkalingam beats Sivadhanu and throws him out of the house. Unable to recover from the humiliation, he goes home heartbroken. Again Mudhaliar comes to make peace, but now replies how Chokkalingam and his family had humiliated him and his family citing their poverty, and refuses to back to their house.

A few months pass by and Sivadhanu who has been living a lonely life, has requested a transfer to Dhanbad, which makes his family saddened. Sivadhanu's superior and his wife, visit Chokkalingam and request him to send Parvathi along with Sivadhanu but Chokkalingam angrily refuses to send Parvathi and his granddaughter along with them. Parvathi goes against her will and stays with her parents as per her father's advice. Before Sivadhanu leaves for Dhanbad, a situation arises where he has to attend his close friend Pokkiri's wedding which is situated near Parvathi's house. Even as Sivadhanu walks past Parvathi's house, he hears his toddler daughter Madhavi's cry and yearns to see her, but the humiliation makes him unable to stay there anymore, Sivadhanu quickly leaves the wedding. When Parvathi learns that Sivadhanu has come to the wedding, with a change of mind, she runs and reunites with Sivadhanu, now with the determination that it doesn't matter what her father thinks.

== Cast ==
- Cheran as Sivadhanu
- Rathi as Parvathi, Sivadhanu's wife
- Manivannan as Chief Engineer
- Janagaraj as Chidhambaram Mudhaliar
- Pyramid Natarajan as Chokkalingam, Parvathi's father
- Pushpavanam Kuppusamy as Pokkiri, Sivadhanu's friend
- Kumarimuthu as Sadaiyandi
- Kambar Jayaraman as Pachamuthu, Sivadhanu's father
- Sathish Stephen as Sivadhanu's brother
- Balu Anand as a bride's relative
- Yuvarani as Manoranjitham, Chief Engineer's wife
- Kalairani as Sayavarnam, Sivadhanu's mother
- Sathyapriya as Neelavathi, Parvathi's mother
- Rindhya as Lakshmi, Sivadhanu's sister
- Anuja Reddy as Kalyani
- George Maryan as Panneer, Sivadhanu's school friend (uncredited)
- Appukutty as Prabakaran, hotel server (uncredited)
- Muthukaalai as a fighter in market (uncredited)

Cameo appearances

- Pazha Nedumaran as himself
- Ki. Rajanarayanan as himself
- P. D. Elangovan as himself
- V. Gowthaman as a taxi driver

== Production ==
After the critically acclaimed Azhagi, Thangar Bachan announced his next project Solla Marantha Kadhai. The director said he chose Cheran because he fitted the bill, adding, "I had also watched Cheran direct his artists in 'Pandavar Bhoomi' for which i was the cinematographer. I was amazed at the expressions he brought to his face, and when i was casting for my film, his was the first name that came to my mind". The film marked the debut of folk-singer Pushpavanam Kuppusamy as an actor. An 80-day shooting schedule was held at locations in Cuddalore, Mayiladuthurai, Neyveli and Chidambaram.

== Music ==
The music was composed by Ilaiyaraaja. VigneshRam of Nilacharal wrote "“Solla marantha kathai” is like feeling a natural southern breeze after being in just cool air-conditioning. No doubt that “Solla marantha kathai” is a “Must Buy” album with mesmerizing music and appreciable decent lyrics".

Track listing
No.	Title	Singer(s)	Length
1.	"Kattula Thalai"	Vidhu Prathap	5:00
2.	"Gundu Malli"	Harish Raghavendra, Shreya Ghoshal	5:10
3.	"Amma Sonna"	Vijay Yesudas, Ilaiyaraaja	5:37
4.	"Panam Mattum"	Ilaiyaraaja	5:20
5.	"Yaedho Onn"	Bhavatharini, Karthik	5:19
6.	"Jakkamma"	Mayilsamy, Ilaiyaraaja	4:08
Total length:			30:34

== Critical reception ==
Malathi Rangarajan of The Hindu wrote, "Thankar Bachan's story telling skill stirred you in "Azhagi" but somehow the magic is missing this time". Sify wrote "After that fairy tale Azhagi, Thankar Bachchan's second attempt to produce another whiff of romance with Solla Marantha Kathai has turned sour. The film is a mushy sentimental hogwash that reminds you of the tearjerkers of 50's and 60's." Malini Mannath of Chennai Online wrote, "Bachan's second release 'Solla Marantha Kathai' disappoints, coming nowhere near his earlier one, neither in scripting, treatment nor characterisation. It's an oft told tale with nothing fresh or new about it".

Cinesouth wrote "Though the film proceeds with an air of gloom and with a total lack of concern about the tastes of the young crowd, the director Thangar Bachchaan succeeded in telling us his story realistically without going off-track". K. N. Vijiyan of New Straits Times wrote, "The story unfolds like a teleserial but has its high points which make it worth watching".
