= Hayagriva =

Horse-headed avatar of Vishnu

- God of Wisdom
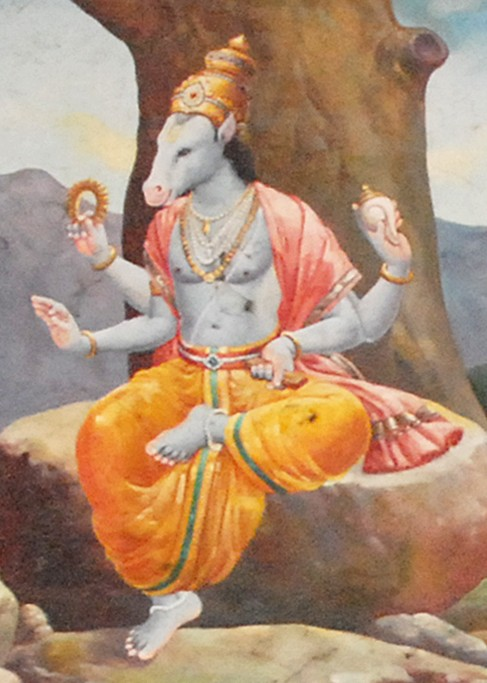
- Painting of Hayagriva, Nataraja Temple, Chidambaram
- Other names: Hayashirsha
- Sanskrit transliteration: Hayagrīva
- Affiliation: Vaishnavism
- Abode: Vaikuntha
- Mantra: jñānānandamayaṃ devaṃ nirmala sphaṭikākṛtim / ādhāraṃ sarva viddyānāṃ hayagrīvaṃ upāsmahe //
- Weapon: Sudarshana Chakra Panchajanya
- Consort: Lakshmi

Hayagriva (Sanskrit: हयग्रीव IAST hayagrīva, lit. 'horse-necked one') is a Hindu deity, the horse-headed avatar of Vishnu. The purpose of this incarnation was to slay a danava also named Hayagriva (A descendant of Kashyapa and Danu), who had the head of a horse and the body of a human.

== Etymology ==
'Haya' means horse and 'griva' means neck. Therefore, Hayagriva literally means "one whose neck is like that of a horse". It refers to the avatar of Vishnu where he adorned the face of a horse.

== Iconography ==
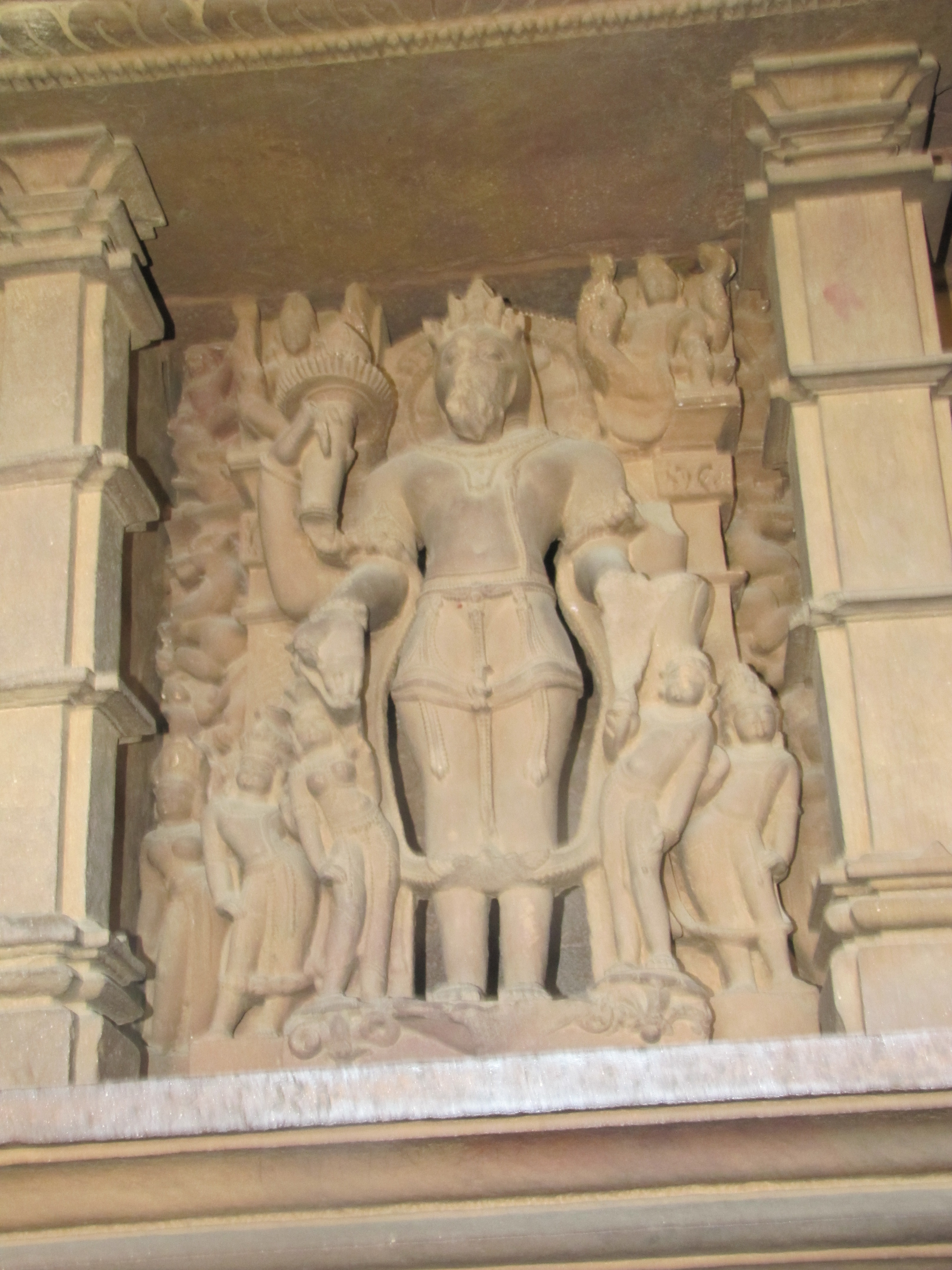
Hayagriva in Khajuraho Lakshamana Temple

Hayagriva is worshipped as the god of knowledge and wisdom, with a human body and a horse's head, brilliant white in color, with white garments and seated on a white lotus. Symbolically, the story represents the triumph of pure knowledge, guided by the hand of Divinity, over the demonic forces of passion and darkness.

Vedanta Desika's dhyāna-śloka (meditative verse) on Hayagriva typifies this deity's depiction in Hindu iconography:

He has four hands, with one in the mode of bestowing knowledge; another holds books of wisdom, and the other two hold the Conch and Discus. His beauty, like fresh cut crystal, is an auspicious brilliance that never decays. May this Lord of speech who showers such cooling rays of grace on me be forever manifest in my heart!

In several other sources he is a white horse who pulls the sun into the sky every morning. In others such as the great epic the Taraka battle where the other deities are attacked by the Danavas [demons], Vishnu appears as a great ferocious warrior called Hayagriva when he comes to their aid. There are many other references to Hayagriva throughout the Mahabharata.

It is said that Vishnu emerges victorious from the battle, in the form of Hayagriva, a fierce form of the deity.

In Hindu contexts, Hayagriva is almost always depicted seated, most often with his right hand either blessing the supplicant or in the vyākhyā mudrā pose of teaching. The right hand also usually holds an akṣa-mālā (rosary), indicating his identification with meditative knowledge. His left hand holds a book, indicating his role as a teacher. His face is always serene and peaceful. Unlike his Buddhist counterpart, there is no hint of a fearsome side in the Hindu depictions of this deity.

Hayagriva is sometimes worshiped in a solitary pose of meditation, as in Thiruvanthipuram Devanathasvami Temple. This form is known as Yoga-Hayagriva. However, he is most commonly worshipped along with his consort Lakshmi and is known as Lakshmi-Hayagriva. Hayagriva in this form is the presiding deity of Mysuru's Parakala Matha, a significant Sri Vaishnavism monastic institution.

== Legend ==
According to legend, during the period of creation, two demons Madhu and Kaitabha stole the Vedas from Brahma, and Vishnu assumed the Hayagriva form to recover them. Yet another legend has it that during the creation, Vishnu compiled the Vedas in the Hayagriva form.

Hayagriva is listed as one of the ten incarnations of Vishnu in canto 10, chapter 40 of the Bhagavata Purana. In the text, Akrura's prayer contains Hayagriva's name when he had a vision while bathing in the Yamuna.

The Mahabharata also features the legend of Hayagriva:

Having compassed the destruction of the two Asuras and restored the Vedas to Brahma, the Supreme Being dispelled the grief of Brahma. Aided then by Hari and assisted by the Vedas, Brahma created all the worlds with their mobile and immobile creatures. After this, Hari, granting unto the Grandsire intelligence of the foremost order relating to the Creation, disappeared there and then for going to the place he had come from. It was thus that Narayana, having assumed the form equipped with the horse-head, slew the two Danavas Madhu and Kaitabha (and disappeared from the sight of Brahma).

— Mahabharata, Book 12, Chapter 348

== Worship ==
Origins about the worship of Hayagriva have been researched, some of the early evidences dates back to 100 BCE, when people worshipped the horse for its speed, strength, intelligence. Hayagriva is one of the prominent deities in Vaikhanasas, Sri Vaishnavism, and the Dvaita Vedanta traditions. His blessings are sought when beginning study of both sacred and secular subjects. Special worship is conducted on the day of the full moon in August (Shravana-Paurnami) (the day of his incarnation) and on Mahanavami, the ninth day of the Navaratri festival.

According to legend, a Dvaita philosopher named Vadirajatirtha is regarded to have offer cooked horse gram to Hayagriva, and the deity is regarded to have appeared to consume his offerings.

Hayagriva is also amongst the deities present at the Ranganathaswamy Temple, Srirangam.

== Temples ==
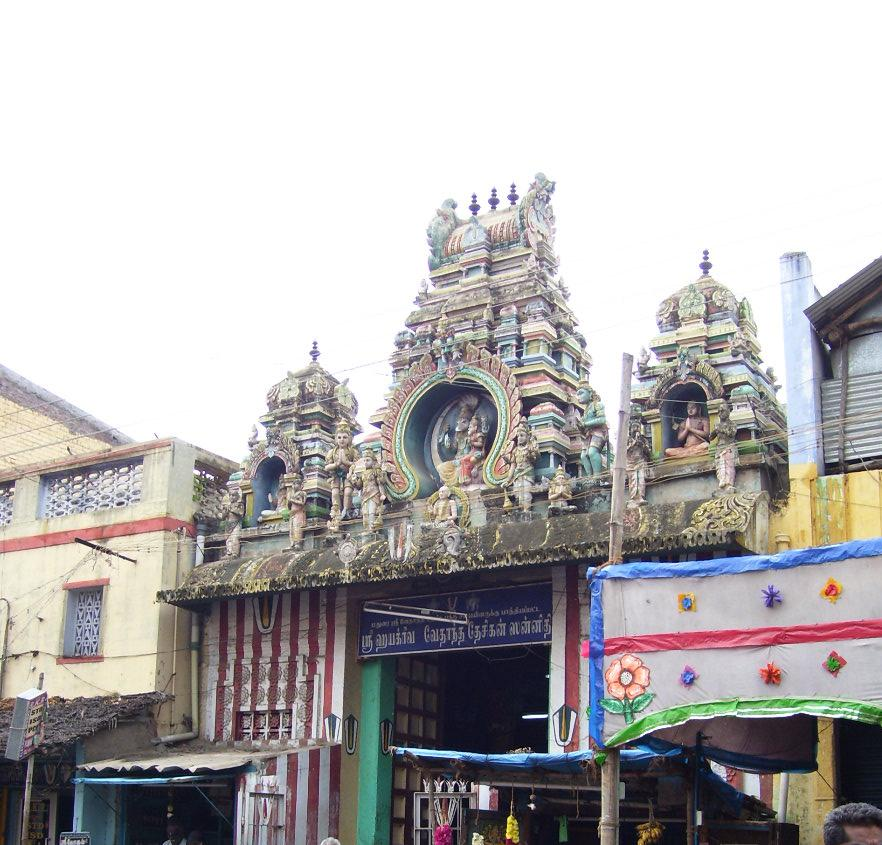
Hayagreevar Temple, adjacent to Koodal Azhagar Temple

=== Andhra Pradesh ===
- Tirumala Hayagriva temple on North Mada street of Srinivasa/ Balaji Temple, Tirumala, Tirupati
- Sri Lakshmi Hayagriva Swami Temple, Machilipatnam
- Sri Lakshmi Hayagriva Temple, Thotlakonda, Visakhapatnam
- Sri Lakshmi Hayagriva temple, iddhashramam, Narasimhakonda, near jonnawada, Nellore
- Shri Lakshmi Hayagriva Swamy, installed in birthplace of Kethanda patti Swamy at Lakshmipuram, near Kuppam, Chittoor District
- Sri Lakshmi Hayagriva temple, MF Road, Hindupur Mandal, Anantapur

=== Assam ===
- Hayagriv Madhav Dol at Hajo

=== Karnataka ===
- Parakala Mutt, Mysuru - The Hayagriva idol handed down from Vedanta Desika

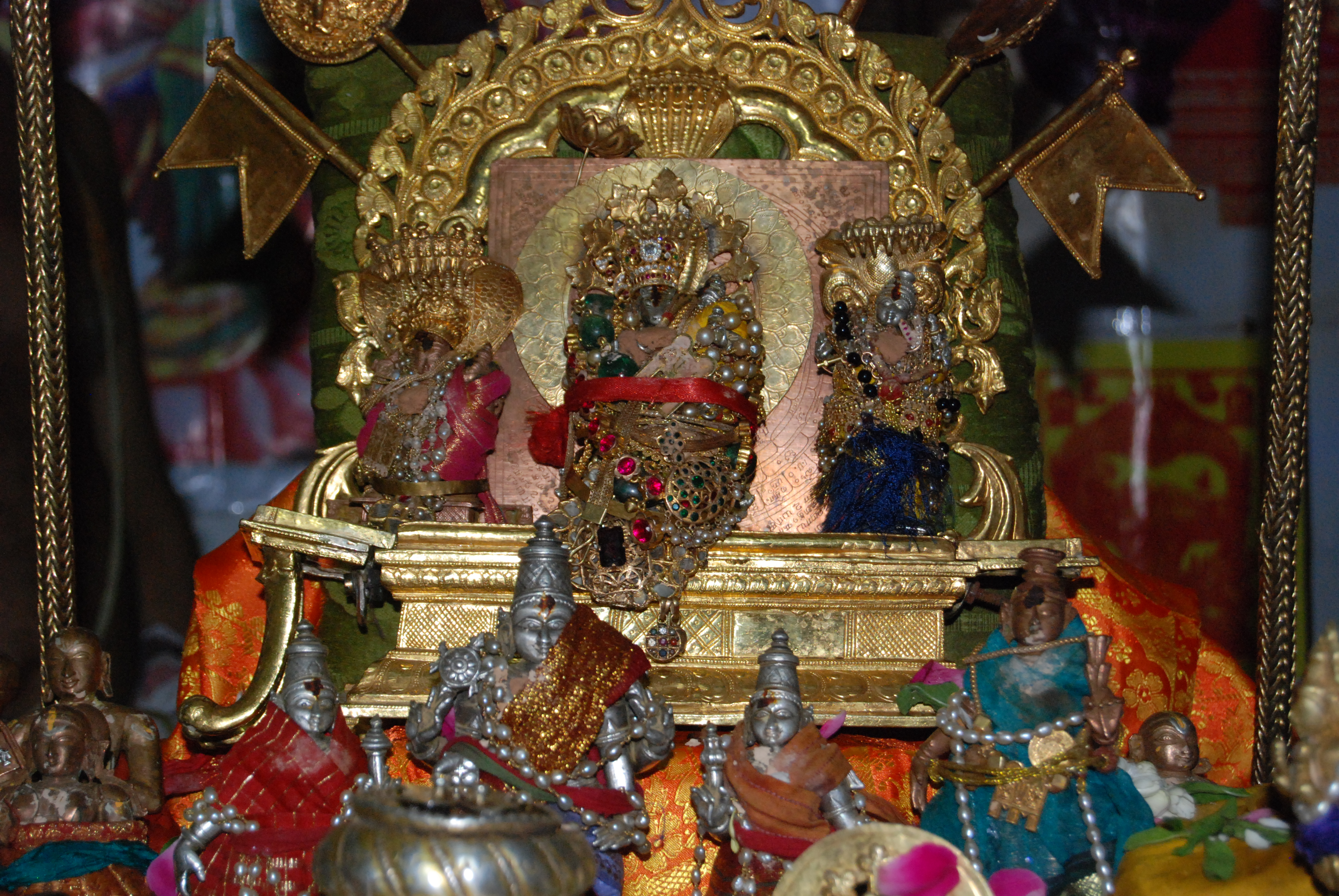
Seen in center is Lakshmi Hayagreeva Vigraha at Parakala Mutt

- Hayagreeva temple, Satyagala, Kollegala taluk, Chamarajanagar district
- Sri Lakshmi Hayagriva Temple, Tank Bund Road, Gandhi Nagar, Bangalore
- Sodhe Mutt, Sirsi

=== Pondicherry ===
Sri Lakshmi Hayagriva Temple in Sri Ramakrishna Nagar, Muthialpet, Pondicherry

- Sri Lakshmi Hayagriva Temple in Sri Ramakrishna Nagar, Muthialpet

=== Tamil Nadu ===
Most of the major Vishnu temples in Tamil Nadu have a separate shrine for Lord Hayagriva.

- Sri Lakshmi Hayagriva Temple, Thiruvaheendrapuram, Cuddalore
- Sri Hayagreevar Temple, adjacent to Sri Koodal Alagar Perumal Koil, Madurai
- Sri Hayagreevar Swamy, Sri Chidambara Vinayagar Thirukoil, A. Vellalapatti (7 km from Alagarkoil or Melur), Madurai.
- Lakshmi hayagrivar temple in chithambara Nagar, near Ganapathi mill, at Tirunelveli
- Sri Lakshmi Hayagreevar perumal, at Sri Kothandaramaswamy Devasthanam, Perumudivakkam, near Kannigaipair (Chennai - Periyapalayam Highway), Thiruvallur District
- Yoga Hayagreevar and Gnana Saraswathi in Vaitheeswaran Koil, Munusamy St, Amrithammal Colony, Perambur, Chennai
- Chettypunyam Hayagriva Temple, near Chengalpattu
- Sri Lakshmi Hayagriva Temple, Nanganallur, Chennai
- Lord Hayagriva Sannidhi in Thooppul Vilakoli (Deepa Prakasar) Perumal Koil in Kanchipuram.
- Vedanta Deshika Alayam, Mylapore
- Lakshmi Hayagreeva Temple, Moovar Nagar, Pozhichalur, Chennai

=== Telangana ===
- Hayagriva Swami Temple, Beechupalli
- Shri Lakshmi Hayagreeva Swamy Temple, Vangapalli Road, Yadagirigutta

== Influence on other cultures ==
In the 2015 documentary series, The Creatures of Philippine Mythology, the spread of Hinduism and the imagery of Hayagriva is tracked through Southeast Asia. It is speculated that Hayagriva influenced the present imagery of the horse-headed Philippine mythological spirit, the Tikbalang.

An extinct genus of basal neornithischian dinosaur known from Mongolia has been named Haya griva. This name refers to the elongate horse-like skull of Haya and the appearance of this deity in the Buddhist art of Mongolia.

== Demon Hayagriva ==
The demon Hayagriva was a son of Kashyapa and Danu. He became the first ruler of the Danavas. In Hindu texts, it is stated that when Vishnu had created the Vedas and given them to Brahma, Shiva had decided to wipe out all of humanity except for Manu and his wife, as the rest of humanity was too corrupt to obtain the Vedas. When Hayagariva learnt that humans would be greater than the Danavas, he set out to stop the humans from obtaining the Vedas. Hayagriva visited the Satyaloka when Brahma was absent, and turned into a horse to get the attention of the Vedas (who were in the form of 4 children). He asked them why Brahma has brought them to his realm rather than taking them to humanity. After hearing their tale, Hayagriva laughed and deceived them regarding the intentions of Brahma, stating that the deity wished to keep them for himself. The Vedas were then subsequently imprisoned by the demon. Soon, Vishnu assumed his Matsya avatar and instructed Manu the manner by which he should survive the oncoming flood that Shiva would shortly send to vanquish all evil. Vishnu then slew Hayagriva in his Matsya form and freed the Vedas to bequeath them to Manu after the passage of the flood.

== See also ==
- Hayagriva (Buddhism)
- Haya (dinosaur)
- Keshi (demon) – Horse-demon killed by Krishna, an avatar of the god Vishnu
- Dadhichi - a sage who had the head of a horse attached to his body by the Ashwins.

== Bibliography ==
- Dictionary of Hindu Lore and Legend (ISBN 0-500-51088-1) by Anna L. Dallapiccola
- Prof. D. Sridhara Babu (1990). HAYAGRIVA - The Horse-headed Deity in Indian Culture. Sri Venkateshwara University - Oriental Research Institute, Tirupati.
- Veṅkaṭanātha (1978). Sri Hayagreeva Stotram of Vedanta Desika. Visishtadvaitha Pracharini Sabha.
- Devi Bhagawatam
