= Kizhoor, Puducherry =

Kizhoor Kizhur
- Village
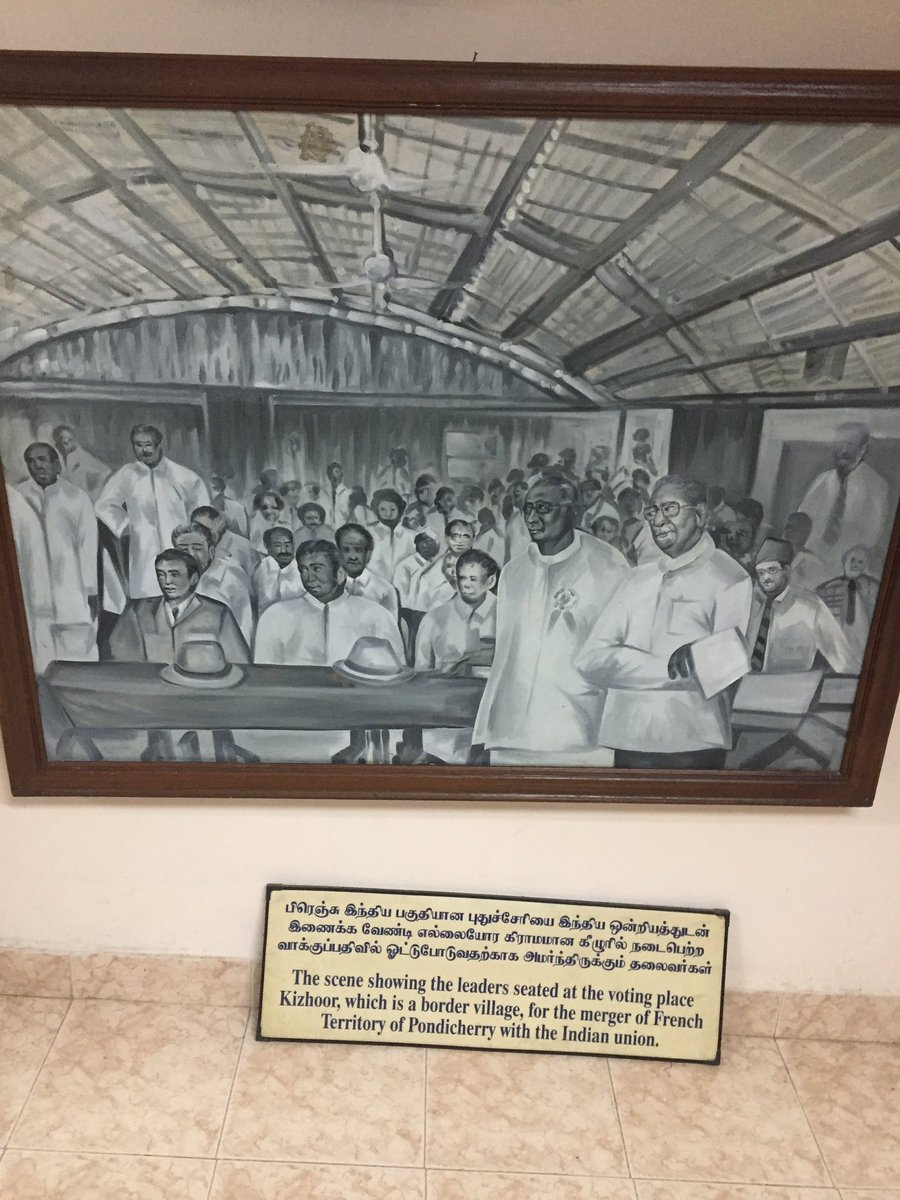
- Referendum for Independence from France

- Location in Puducherry, India Kizhoor (India)
- Coordinates: 11°53′03″N 79°40′35″E
- Country: India
- State: Puducherry
- District: Pondicherry
- Taluk: Puducherry
- Commune: Villianur

Population (2011)
  - Total: 2,955

Languages
  - Official: French, Tamil, English
- Time zone: UTC+5:30 (IST)
- PIN: 605 106
- Telephone code: 0413
- Vehicle registration: PY-01

Kizhoor is a village situated in the Villianur Commune Panchayat, Puducherry. It is located around 22 kilometers away from Pondicherry. Kizhoor comes under the Mangalam Constituency of the Union Territory of Puducherry. The population of Kizhur in 2011 was 2,955.

== Introduction ==
Kizhoor has an important place in the Indian Independence Movement. French Government had conducted a Referendum in Kizhoor either to continue as a French Colonial State or to unite with the Indian nation. The French government conceded the merger of Puducherry and other French establishments through at Kizhoor.

== Independence movement ==
Pondicherry played a dual role in the history of the independence movement. It fought for its independence and also gave tremendous support to India’s independence struggle against the British. The post-independence government initiated discussions to integrate the French-Indian territories with the country. The National Youth Congress began a Satyagraha. Pro-merger processions were organized by independence fighters who were often lathi-charged, their flags seized and torn by the French-Indian police. A momentous event in Pondicherry’s independence movement occurred on 18 October 1954 when all elected members of the Representative Assembly and the Municipal Councils met to consider the joint proposals of the French and Indian Governments for a final settlement through a Referendum. This is known as Kizhoor Congress. Monsieur Balasubramanian, President of Assemblée Réprésentative, was the presiding officer of the congress which voted in a secret ballot. An overwhelming majority of 170 out of 178 members favored the merger of French Indian territories with India.

France transferred its last four territories — Pondicherry, Karaikal, Yanam and Mahe — to India on 1 November 1954. M R K Nehru, General Secretary of Foreign Affairs, hoisted the Indian flag. Kewal Singh, the first High Commissioner of the new state, and Pierre Landy, special diplomatic representative of the French Republic Government, exchanged signatures at the Governor’s transfer of power ceremony. It was on 16 August 1962 that, in adherence to the time-tested template of the voice of the people being the voice of God, the French Government conceded the merger of Puducherry and other French establishments through De Jure Transfer. This was a direct sequel to the verdict registered at a referendum for merger of Puducherry with the Indian Union.

== Gallery ==
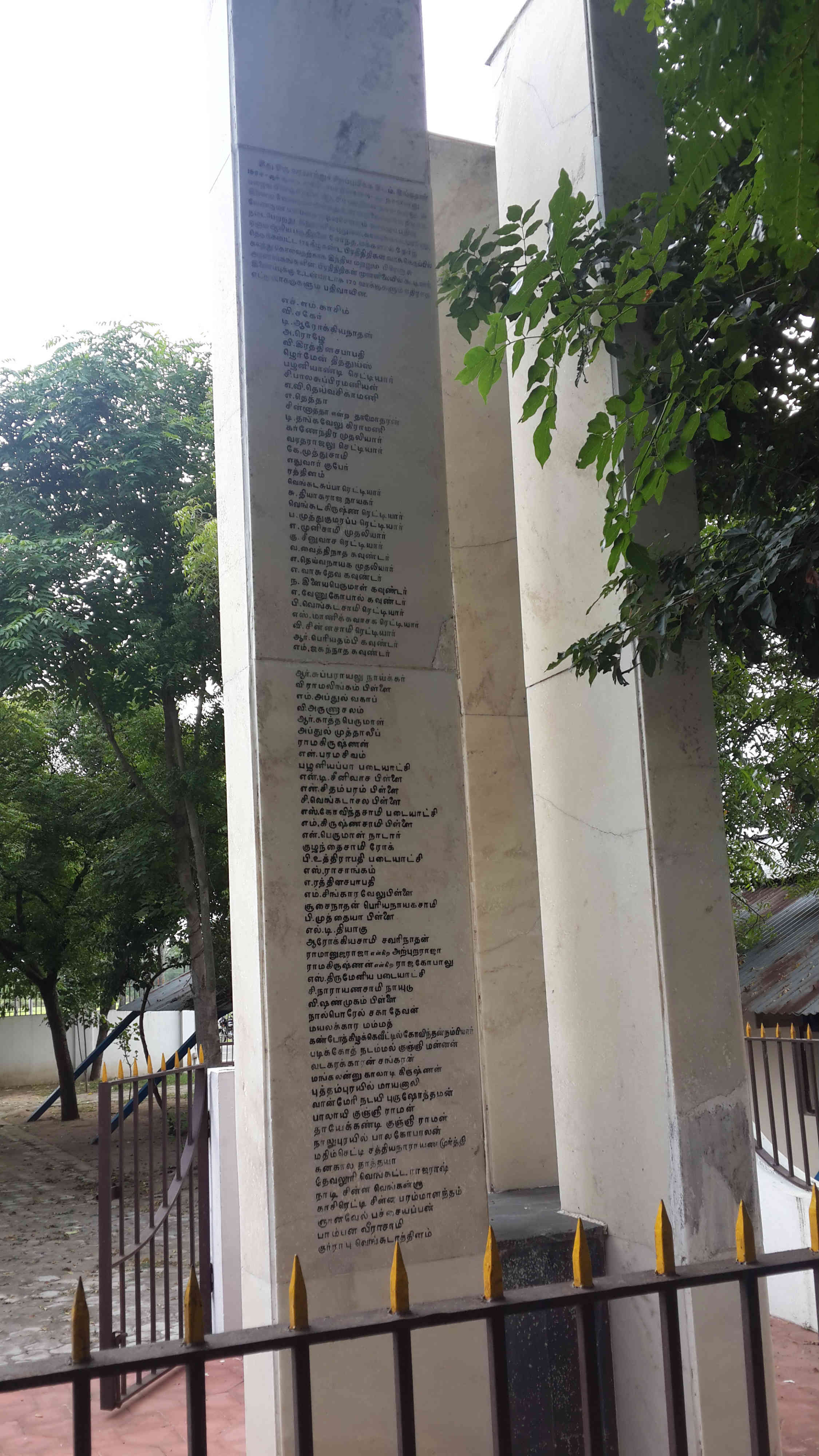
Kizhur Declaration Monument

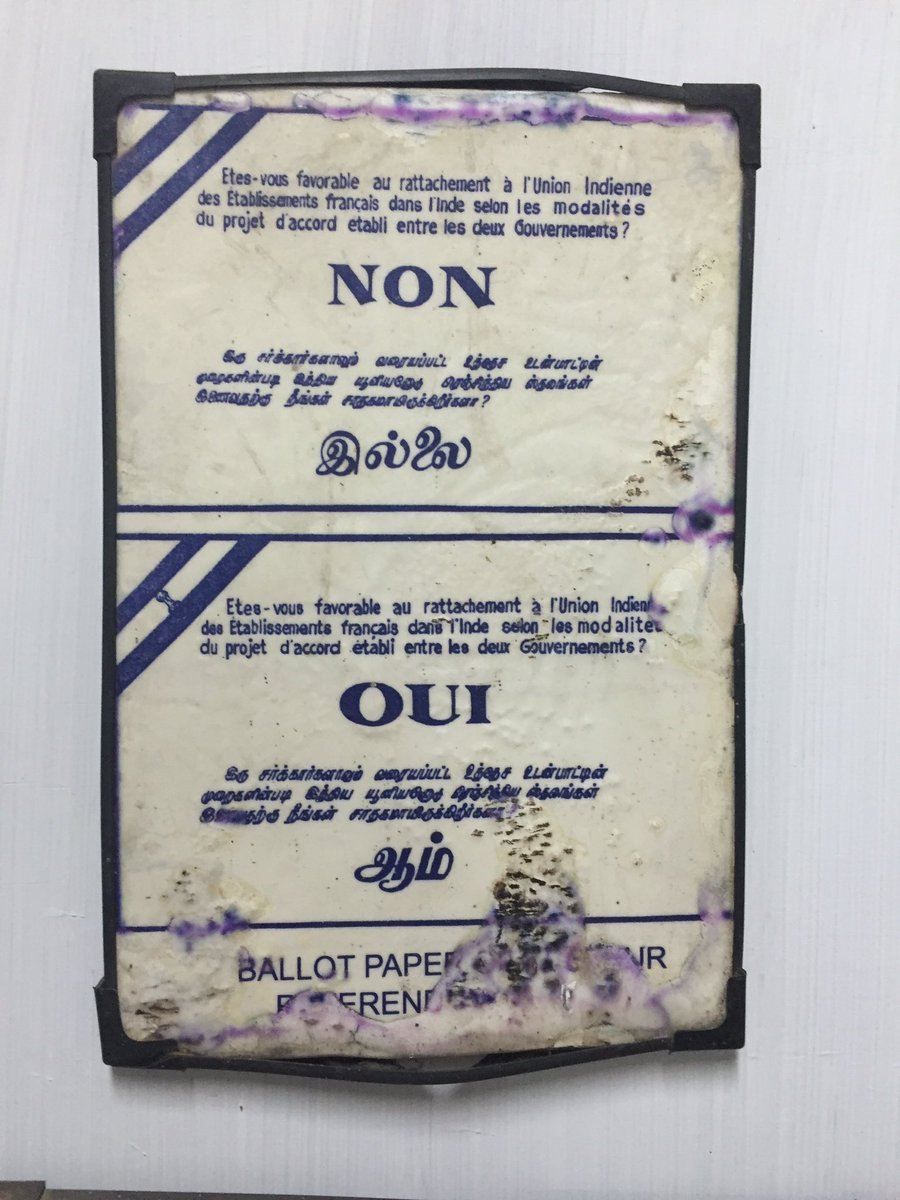
Referendum Ballot

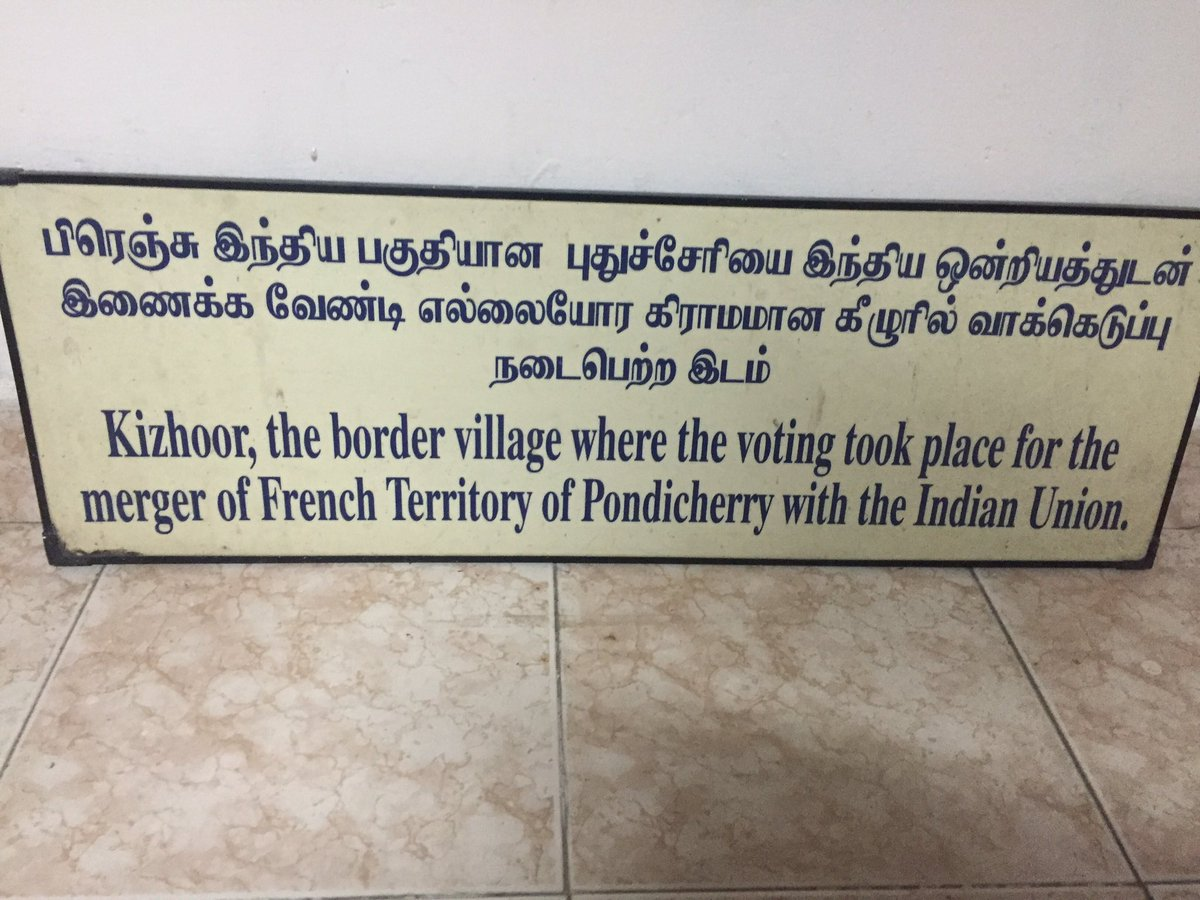
Kizhur Signboard
