= Chapirevula =

- Revenue Village
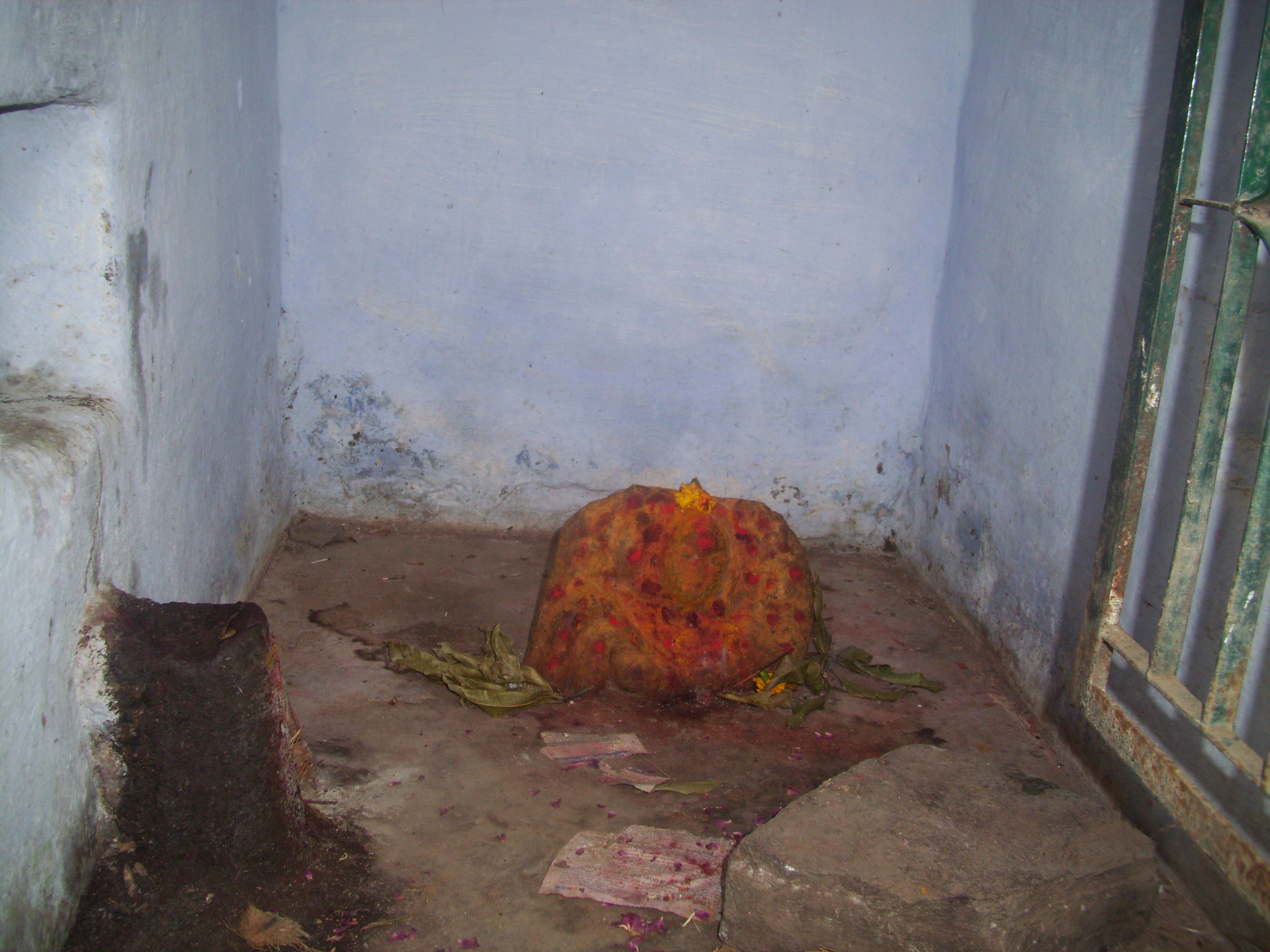
- Bangaramma Gudi in Chapirevula
- Interactive map of Chapirevula
- Location in Andhra Pradesh, India Chapirevula (India)
- Coordinates: 15.455417°N 78.434143°E
- Country: India
- State: Andhra Pradesh
- District: Nandyal
- Mandal: Nandyal Rural
- Talukas: Nandyal

Area
  - Total: 50 km^{2} (19 sq mi)

Population (2011)
  - Total: 5,987
  - Density: 120/km^{2} (310/sq mi)

Languages
  - Official: Telugu
- Time zone: UTC+5:30 (IST)
- PIN: 518502
- Telephone code: 08514
- Vehicle registration: AP 21
- Literacy: 50%
- Climate: 20 to 40 (Köppen)

Chapirevula is a village in Nandyal Rural mandal of Nandyal district, Andhra Pradesh, India.

== Geography ==
Chapirevula is located at 15.48°N 78.48°E and has an average elevation of 203 metres (666 ft). Chapirevula lies in the western part of Andhra Pradesh. This region is bounded by thick Nallamala forests. A canal from the Telugu Ganga project and SRBC canal flow near Chapirevula making the land fertile.

== Demographics ==
Chapirevula has a population of over 5,000. Males constitute ~48% of the population and females ~52%. Chapirevula has an average literacy rate of 45%: male literacy is ~50%. In Chapirevula, 50% of the population is above 40 years of age as many of the educated left the village to pursue their careers in cities like Nandyal and Hyderabad and foreign countries like the United States of America.
