= Pandurangapuram, Kurnool =

Pandurangapuram
- village
- Interactive map of Pandurangapuram
- Location in Andhra Pradesh, India Pandurangapuram (India)
- Coordinates: 15.440154°N 78.432899°E
- Country: India
- State: Andhra Pradesh
- District: Kurnool
- Talukas: Nandyal
- Elevation: 151 m (495 ft)

Population (2011)
  - Total: 2,100

Languages
  - Official: Telugu
- Time zone: UTC+5:30 (IST)
- PIN: 518502
- Telephone code: 08514
- Vehicle registration: AP 21
- Literacy: 95%
- Climate: 20 to 43 (Köppen)
- Website: www.pandurangapuram.org

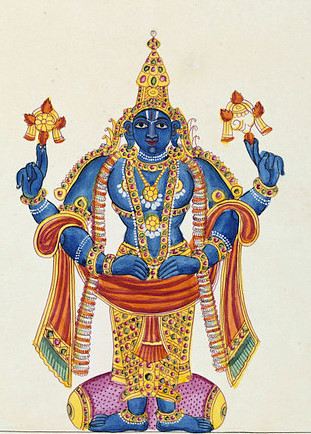
A 19th-century image of Panduranga, the eponymous manifestation of Vishnu's avatar Krishna

Pandurangapuram or Panduranga Puram is a village in Kurnool district, Andhra Pradesh, India. It should not be confused with the village of that name in Khammam district as well as near the bapatla, guntur district.

== Nearby villages ==
- East - Kanala
- North - Chapirevula
- West - Thogarcheedu
