= Melakuppam =

- Village
- Location in Tamil Nadu, India Melakuppam (India)
- Coordinates: 11.8684°N 79.6911°E
- Country: India
- State: Tamil Nadu
- District: Cuddalore
- taluk: Cuddalore

Languages
  - Official: Tamil
- Time zone: UTC+5:30 (IST)
- PIN: 605106
- Vehicle registration: TN-31

Melakuppam is one of the revenue village in Cuddalore district of Indian state, Tamil Nadu.
