= Manakuppam =

- Village
- Location in Puducherry, India Manakuppam (India)
- Coordinates: 11.867742°N 79.6978819°E
- Country: India
- State: Puducherry
- District: Puducherry
- Taluk: Villianur
- Commune: Villianur

Population (2011)
  - Total: 939

Languages
  - Official: Tamil, English, French
- Time zone: UTC+5:30 (IST)
- PIN: 605 106
- STD code: 0413
- Vehicle registration: PY-01
- Sex ratio: 50% ♂/♀

Manakuppam is one of the villages under Sathamangalam revenue village in the Union Territory of Puducherry. It is an isolated part of Villianur Commune and Villianur Taluk.

== Geography ==
Manakuppam is surrounded by Tamil Nadu, bordered by Nallathur (East and North), Nadukuppam (west) and the dried Malattaru river in the south.

== Transport ==
Manakuppam is located 18 km from Pondicherry city. Manakuppam can be reached by bus running between Pondicherry and Madukarai.

== Road Network ==
Manakuppam is connected to Pondicherry by Mangalam - Maducarai State Highway (RC-19)

== Politics ==
Manakuppam is a part of Mangalam Assembly Constituency which comes under Puducherry (Lok Sabha constituency).
