= Karaimedu =

Karaimedu Periya Karaimedu
- Village
- Nickname: Periya Karaimedu
- Location in Tamil Nadu, India Karaimedu (India)
- Coordinates: 11.8186°N 79.7310°E
- Country: India
- State: Tamil Nadu
- District: Cuddalore
- Taluk: Cuddalore
- Block: Cuddalore

Languages
  - Official: Tamil
- Time zone: UTC+5:30 (IST)
- Vehicle registration: TN-31

Karaimedu is a revenue village in Cuddalore district, state of Tamil Nadu, India. Karaimedu is a small village, which is 2.5 km away from Bahour with more than one hundred families lives there. The village is situated in the southern border of Bahour lake.
