= Vamaneeswarar Temple =

Shiva temple in Tamil Nadu, India

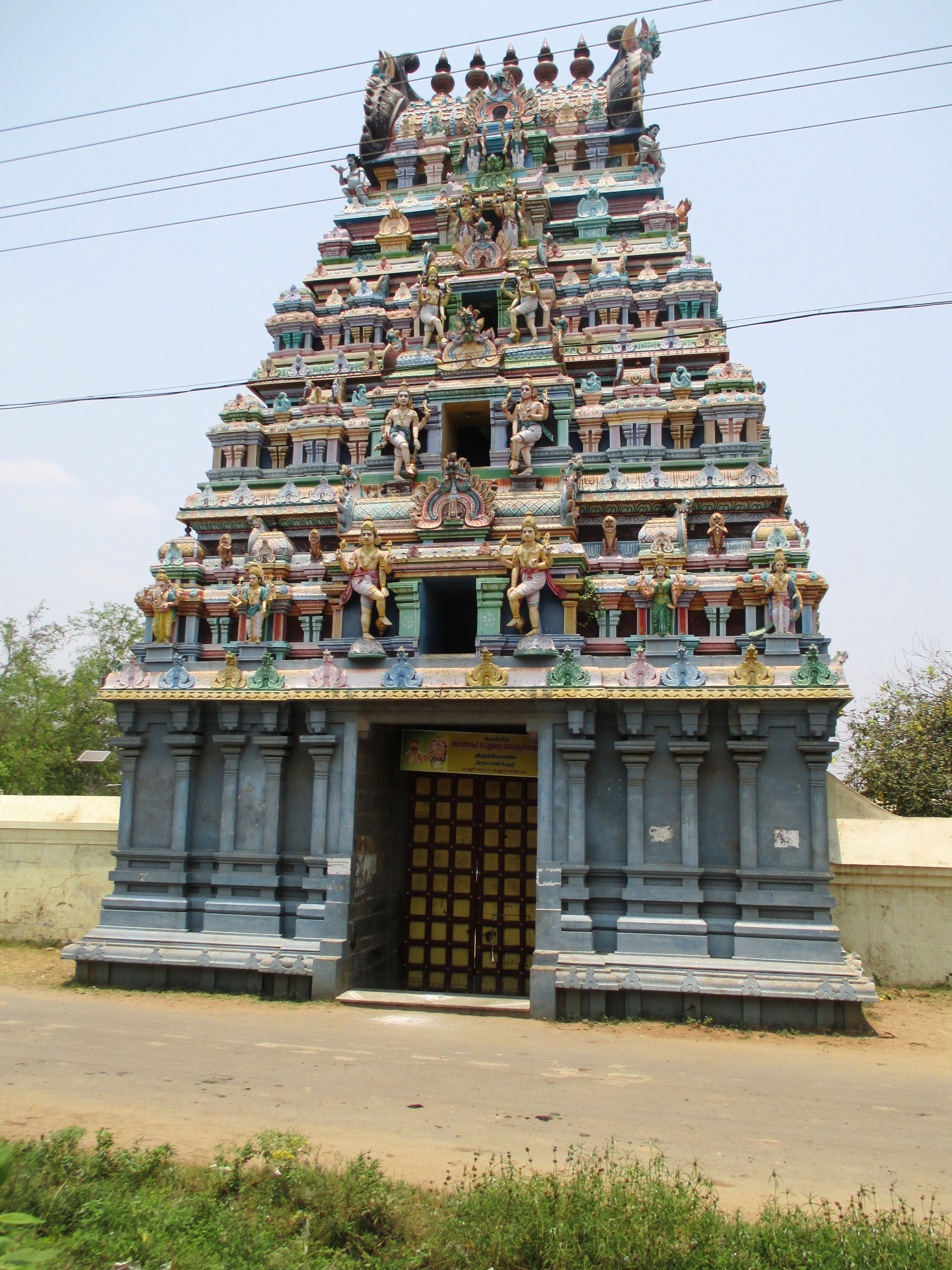

- Location in Tamil Nadu

Religion
- Affiliation: Hinduism
- District: Cuddalore
- Deity: Vamaneeswarar(Shiva)

Location
- State: Tamil Nadu
- Country: India
- Coordinates: 11°44′14.7″N 79°41′0.9″E

Architecture
- Type: Dravidian architecture

Vamaneeswarar Temple (also called Thirumanikuzhi Temple) is a Hindu temple dedicated to the deity Shiva, in Thirumanikuzhi, a village in Cuddalore district in the Indian state of Tamil Nadu. Shiva is worshiped as Vamaneeswarar, and is represented by the lingam. His consort Parvati is depicted as Manonmani Amman. The temple is located on the Chennai - Villupuram highway on the banks of Kedilam river. The presiding deity is revered in the 7th century Tamil Saiva canonical work, the Tevaram, written by Tamil saint poets known as the nayanmars and classified as Paadal Petra Sthalam.

The temple complex covers an area of two acres and all its shrines are enclosed with concentric rectangular walls. The temple has a number of shrines, with those of Vamaneeswarar being the most prominent.

The original complex is believed to have been built by Cholas, with later additions from different ruling dynasties. In modern times, the temple is maintained and administered by the Hindu Religious and Charitable Endowments Department of the Government of Tamil Nadu.

== Legend and history ==
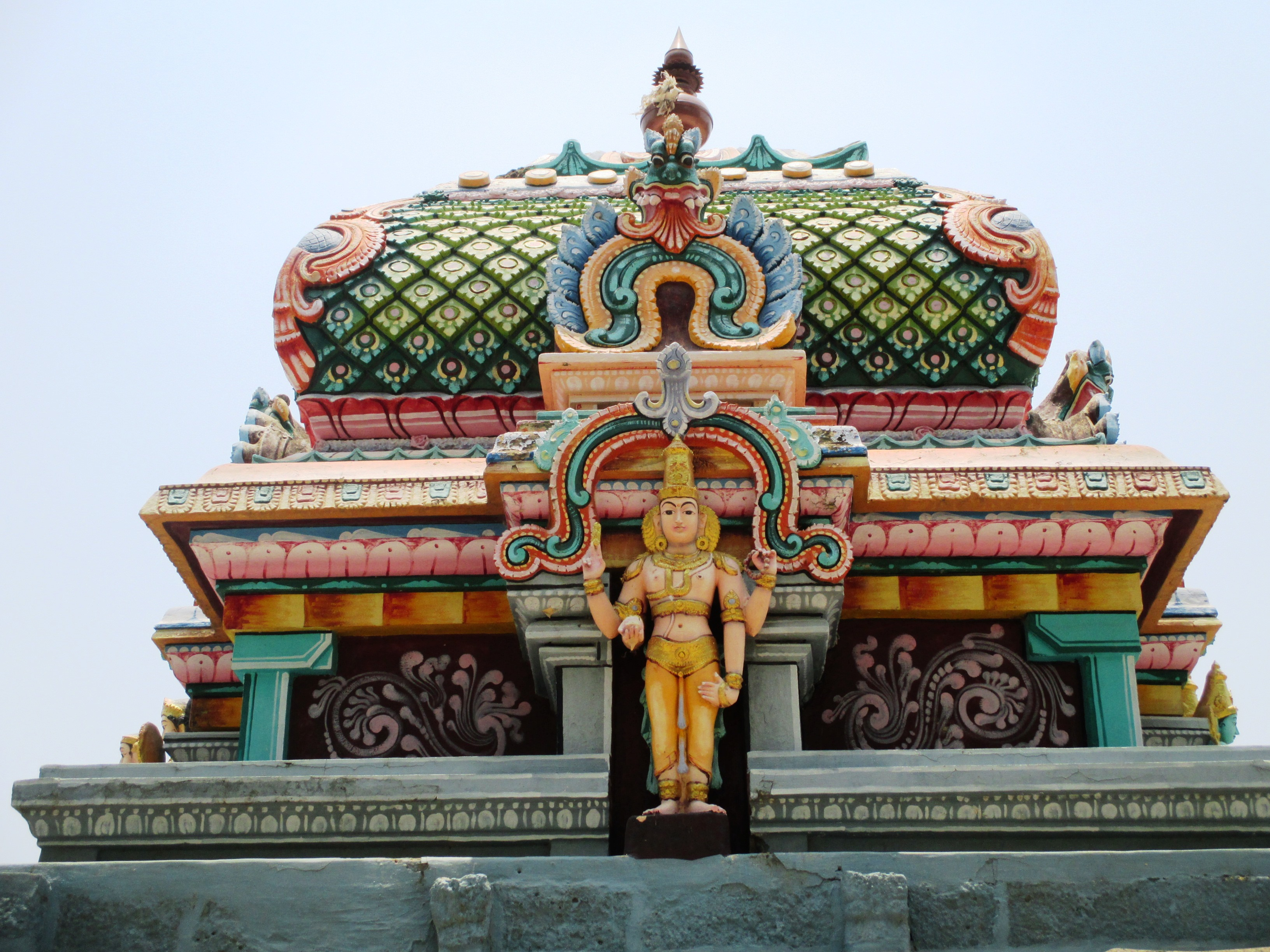
The image of Shiva in the vimana

As per Hindu legend, Bali was the grandson of Prahlada. King Mahabali, though an asura king, was generous, and engaged in severe austerities and penance and won the praise of the world. With the praise from his courtiers and others, he regarded himself as the all powerful in the world. Vamana, in the guise of a short Brahmin carrying a wooden umbrella, went to the king to request three paces of land. Mahabali consented, against the warning of his guru, Sukracharya. Vamana then revealed his identity and enlarged to gigantic proportions to stride over the three worlds. He stepped from heaven to earth with the first step, from earth to the netherworld with the second. King Mahabali, unable to fulfill his promise, offered his head for the third. Vamana then placed His Foot and gave the king immortality for his humility. Though he attained divine grace, he incurred blame of the society for the means of reaching divinity. He is believed to have worshipped in the temple for relief. Since Bali worshipped Maani (young Brahmachari Vishnu) and was immersed in a kuzhi (hole), the place came to be known as Thirumaanikuzhi.

The place was originally believed to be the worshipping place of Kochengat Chola, a prominent Chola king. During his time, a part of the place was constituted as Perumbalaponmeyaperumalnallur. The original structure is believed to be existent from time immemorial, while the later additions are believed to have been built by Cholas, while the present masonry structure was built during the 16th century. There are inscriptions from later Chola emperors like Rajaraja Chola I (985–1014), Kulothunga Chola I (1070–1120), and Rajendra Chola III (1246–1279). The inscription in the entrance of the temple are numbered 165 of 1902.

== Architecture ==
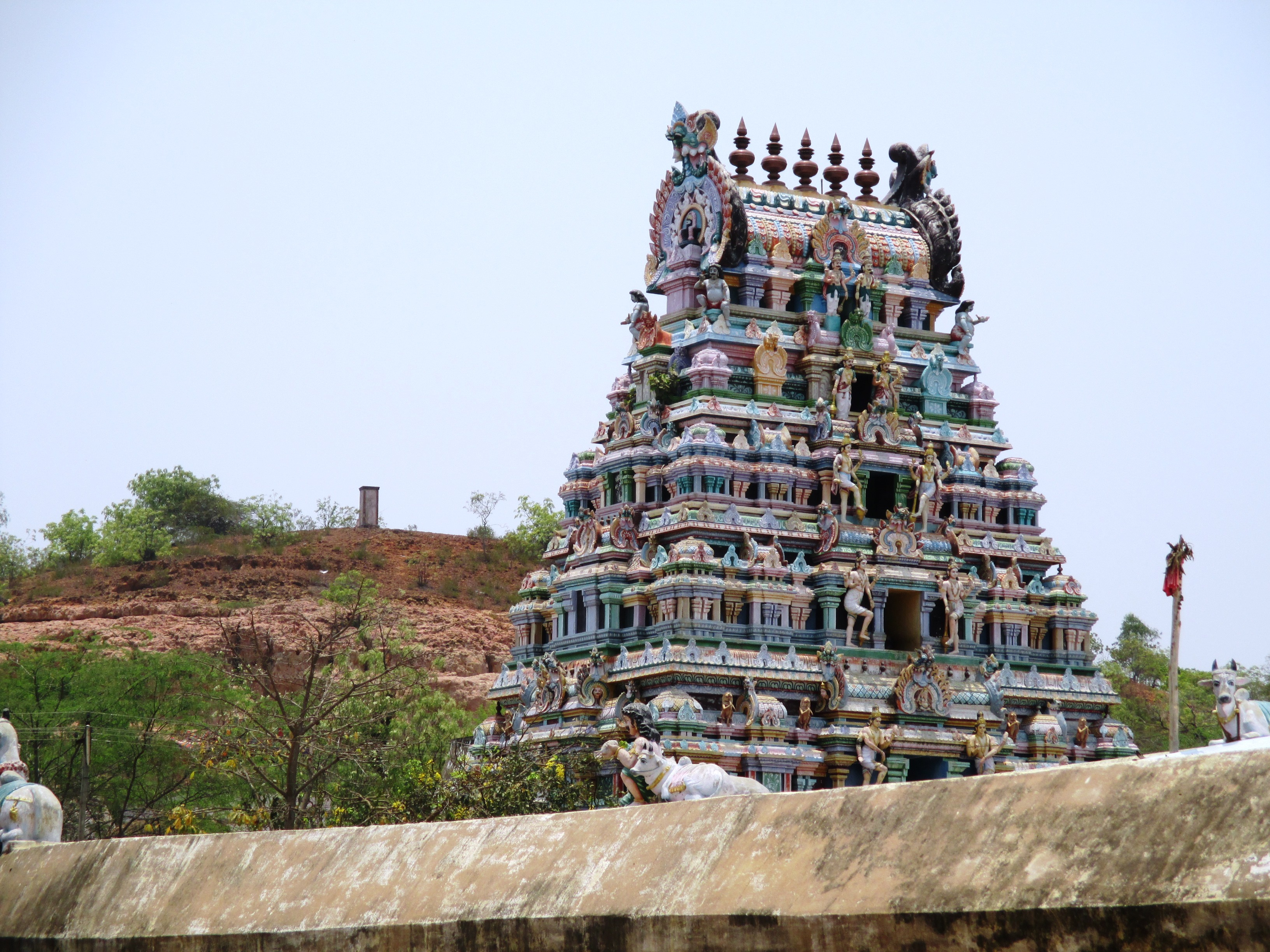
The image of temple

Vamaneeswarar temple is located in a village called Thirumanikuzhi on Cuddalore - Panruti highway and on the banks of Kedilam river. The temple has a five-tiered entrance tower facing east, and all the shrines of the temple are enclosed in concentric rectangular granite walls. The temple has three precincts. The shrine of Ambujakshi is housed in a shrine facing north is located in the first precinct. The central shrine housing Vamaneeswarar is approached through pillared halls. The shrine houses the image of Vamaneeswarar in the form of Lingam (an iconic form of Shiva). The central shrine is approached through a Mahamandapam and Arthamandapam. As in other Shiva temples in Tamil Nadu, the shrines of Saptamartrikas Vinayaka, Murugan, Navagraha, Chandekeswara and Durga are located around the precinct of the main shrine.

== Religious importance and festivals ==
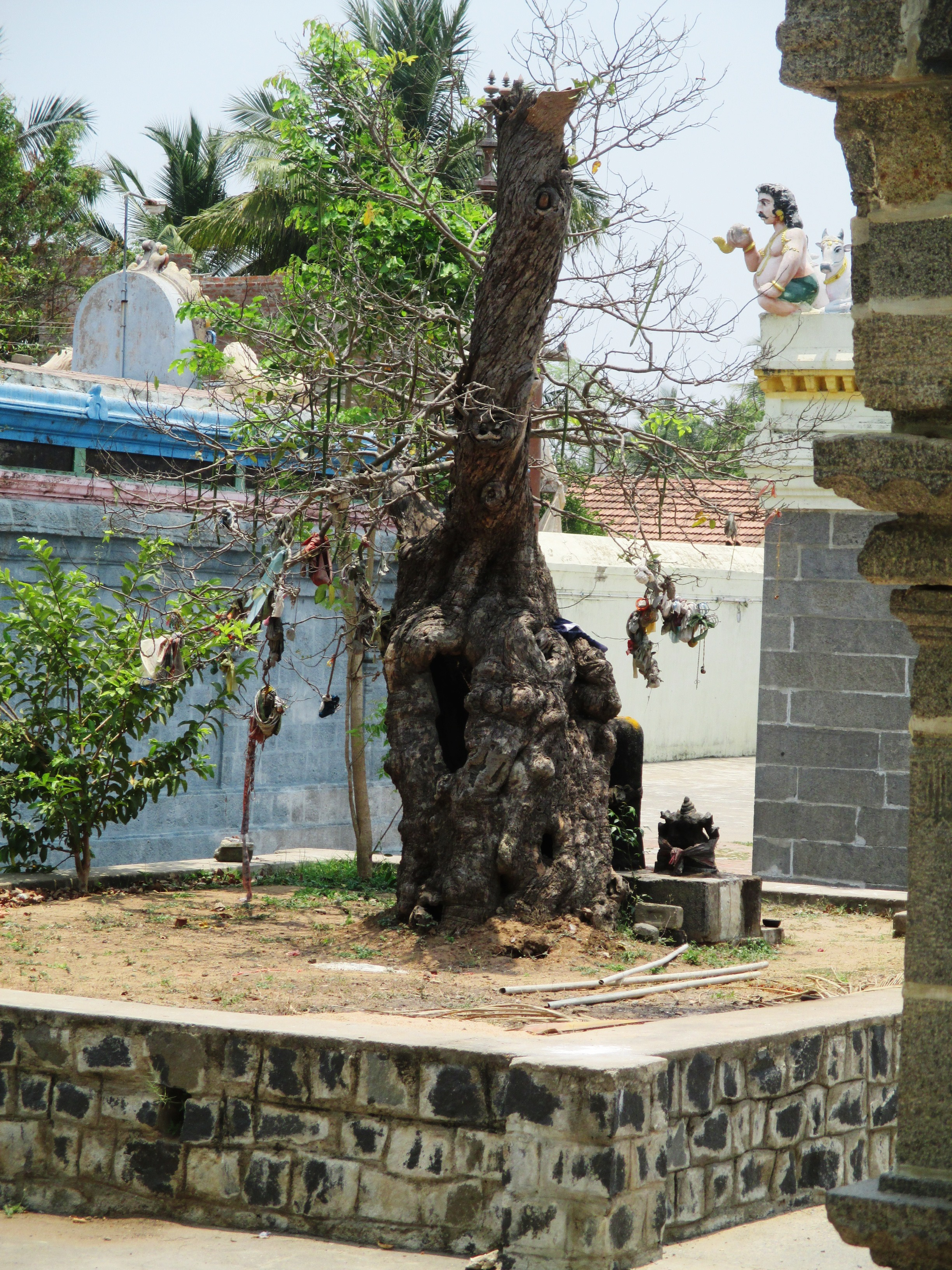
Kondrai tre

It is one of the shrines of the 275 Paadal Petra Sthalams - Shiva Sthalams glorified in the early medieval Tevaram poems by Tamil Saivite Nayanars Thirugnana Sambandar. Surya, the Sun god, is believed to have worshipped Shiva at this place. The image of Shiva is believed to have been self manifested. The presiding deity has been worshipped by various celestial deities. Arunagirinathar has sung praises about Muruga in the temple. Parvathi takes precedence in the temple over Shiva as in the temples like Kanchipuram, Madurai, Kasi and Nagapattinam.
