= Devanathaswamy temple, Thiruvanthipuram =

Perumal temple in Cuddalore district, Tamil Nadu, India

Devanatha Hemabhujavalli Temple
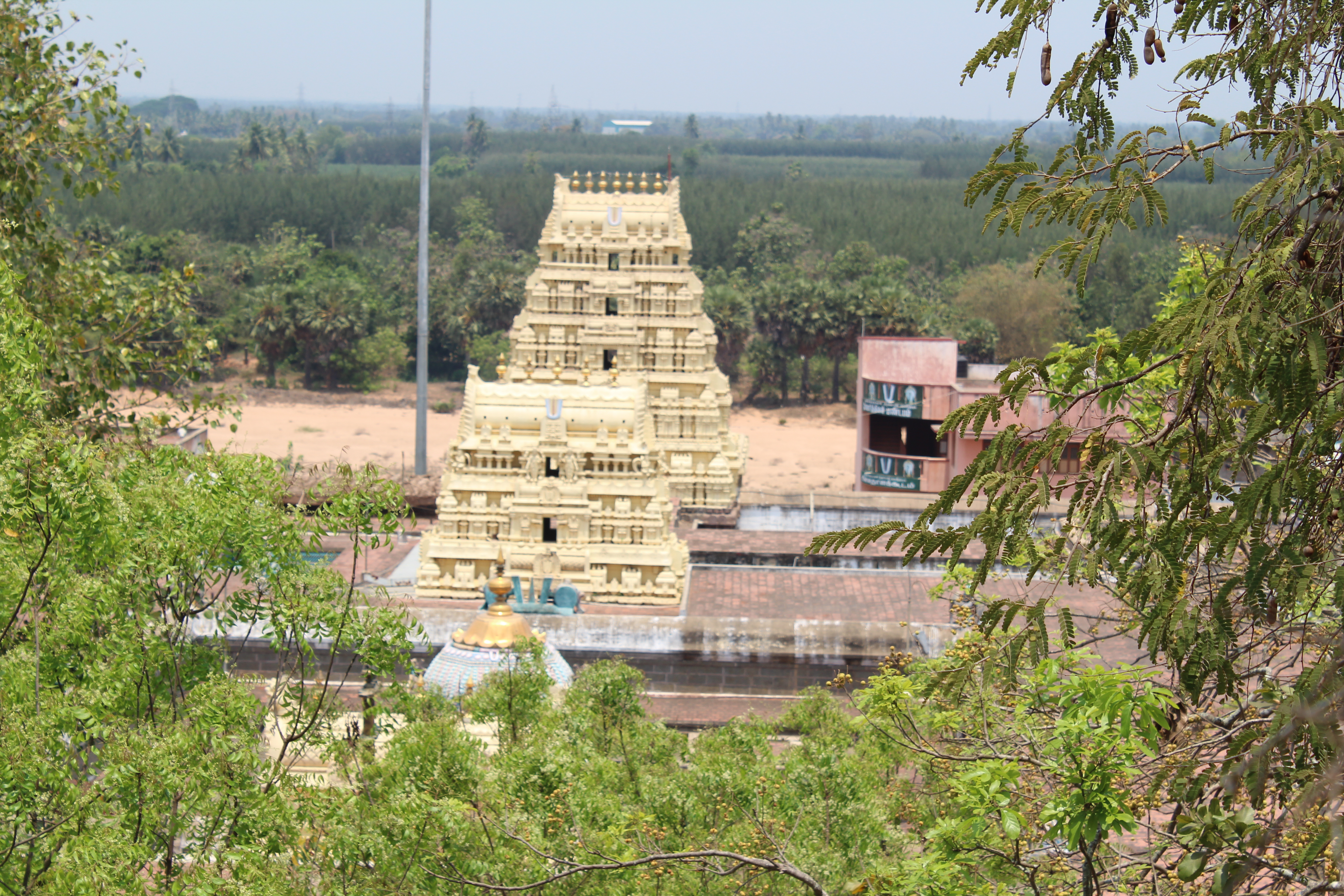

- Location in Tamil Nadu

Religion
- Affiliation: Hinduism
- District: Cuddalore
- Deity: Devanatha (Vishnu) Hemabujavalli (Lakshmi)

Location
- Location: Tamil Nadu, India
- State: Tamil Nadu
- Country: India
- Coordinates: 11.744815°N 79.708986°E

Architecture
- Type: Dravidian architecture

Devanatha Hemabhujavalli Temple (also called Thiruvanthipuram Koyil) (Thiruvaheendrapuram) is a Hindu temple in Thiruvanthipuram, a village in the outskirts of Cuddalore in the South Indian state of Tamil Nadu, dedicated to the god Vishnu and goddess Lakshmi. Constructed in the Dravidian style of architecture, the temple is glorified in the Nalayira Divya Prabandham, the early medieval Tamil canon of the Alvar saints from the 6th–9th centuries CE. It is one of the 108 Divya Desams dedicated to Vishnu, who is worshipped as Devanatha and Lakshmi as Hemabhujavalli. Though the presiding deity is Devanatha and Hemabhujavalli, the temple is known for Hayagriva, the ninth avatara of Vishnu in the Dashavatara of Vishnu and a god of knowledge. The temple is the only historical temple in South India to have a shrine of Hayagriva on hilltop.

The temple in its current form is believed to have been built during the Medieval Cholas, with later expansion from Pandyas, Hoysala Empire and Vijayanagara Empire. The temple has fifty inscriptions from Kulothunga Chola I (1070–1120 CE), Vikrama Chola (1118–1135 CE), Rajaraja Chola III (1216–1256 CE), Jatavarman Sundara Pandyan (1251–1268 CE), Vikrama Pandya, Vira Pandya III, Vijayanagara king Achyuta Deva Raya (1529–1542 CE) and Koperunjinga and many other rulers.

A granite wall surrounds the temple, enclosing all its shrines and bodies of water. The rajagopuram, the temple's gateway tower has five tiers and raises to a height of 60 ft (18 m).

Devanathaswamy is believed to have appeared to Adishesha (the serpent-mount of Vishnu), the sage Markandeya, and the Hindu god Indra. Six daily rituals and three yearly festivals are held at the temple, of which the chariot festival, celebrated during the Tamil month of Chittirai (March–April), is the most prominent. The temple is maintained and administered by the Hindu Religious and Endowment Board of the Government of Tamil Nadu.

Case in Madras High Court pertaining to removal of Christian School on this temple's land.

== Etymology ==
The place was originally believed to have housed a Shiva temple. A Chola ruler, who was a Saiva fanatic, wanted to demolish the Vishnu temple in his province. Seeing the images of Vinayagar and Dakshinamurthy, which are otherwise found in Shiva temples, he was taken aback. It is believed Vishnu himself appeared before the king to acknowledge the oneness of almighty. Following the legend, the image of the presiding deity holds a lotus, the symbol of Brahma and has a third eye like Shiva, denoting the oneness. The region was called Tiruvaheendrapuram to honour Adisesha, who was originally called Vaheendran. Vaheendra is believed to have propitiated Indra, the king of celestial deities. Tiruvaheendrapuram became Thiruvanthipuram with the passage of time.

== Legend ==
The temple finds mention in Brahmanda Purana, Naradiya Purana and Skanda Purana. According to the accounts, a group of sages wanted to view a theophany of Vishnu and went all the way to Tirupparkadal, the Ocean of Milk. They could not view Vishnu there and went all the way to Vaikuntha, the heavenly abode of Vishnu. The guardians there stated that they could meet Vishnu only in a place close to the seashore north of Kumbakonam, south of Tirupathi and west of Kanchipuram. When the sages reached there, they found sage Markandeya and his daughter Bhudevi were doing penance. They could view Mahavishnu in resplendent form with his weapons Sudarshana Chakra (discus), Panchajanya (conch) and Kaumodaki gracing his arms.

As per another legend, Vishnu handed the job of obtaining the pure water of lake Vraja Tirtha located in the netherworld to Garuda, the eagle vahana. Garuda reached the nether world and secretively obtained the water from the lake, without the knowledge of the sage, who established the lake. The sage learned of it and cursed the water to turn impure. Garuda then pleaded with the sage indicating the orders of Vishnu. The elongated transaction delayed the proceedings and Vishnu turned to his other prime devotee Adhishesha the serpent who constructed a well by whipping the earth with his tail. The water from this well is used daily for the preparation of the temple prasad. The legend says, adding salt, pepper and jaggery to this well cures the devotee of any ailments and is religiously followed by people with skin ailments. Garuda was highly aggrieved and felt for his guilt. Vishnu appeased him saying that he would establish a river, which is believed to be the Kedilam river. A ceremonial bath is celebrated annually to commemorate the event.

== History ==
The Epigraphical Department has found more than 50 inscriptions in the temple belonging to the Medieval Chola period. The inscriptions indicate grants to the temple from Kulothunga Chola I (1070–1120 CE), Vikrama Chola (1118–1135), Rajaraja Chola III (1216–1256), Jatavarman Sundara Pandyan (1251–1268), Vikrama Pandya, Vira Pandya III, Vijayanagara king Achyuta Deva Raya (1529–1542 CE) and Koperunjinga. The Chola country was under siege during the rule of Rajaraja Chola III and he was imprisoned by Koperunjinga, a Pallava scion. Vira Narasimha II (1220–1234) came to the rescue of the Chola and ultimately killed the Ceylon king Parakramabahu. A temple tower was erected during the reign of Koperunjinga, while the procedures of worship were accorded similar to other temples during the reign of Maravarman Sundara Pandyan. The descendants of Ramanuja were given special provisions for worship during the period of Vijayanara Empire. In modern times, the temple is maintained and administered by the Hindu Religious and Endowment Board of the Government of Tamil Nadu.

== Architecture ==
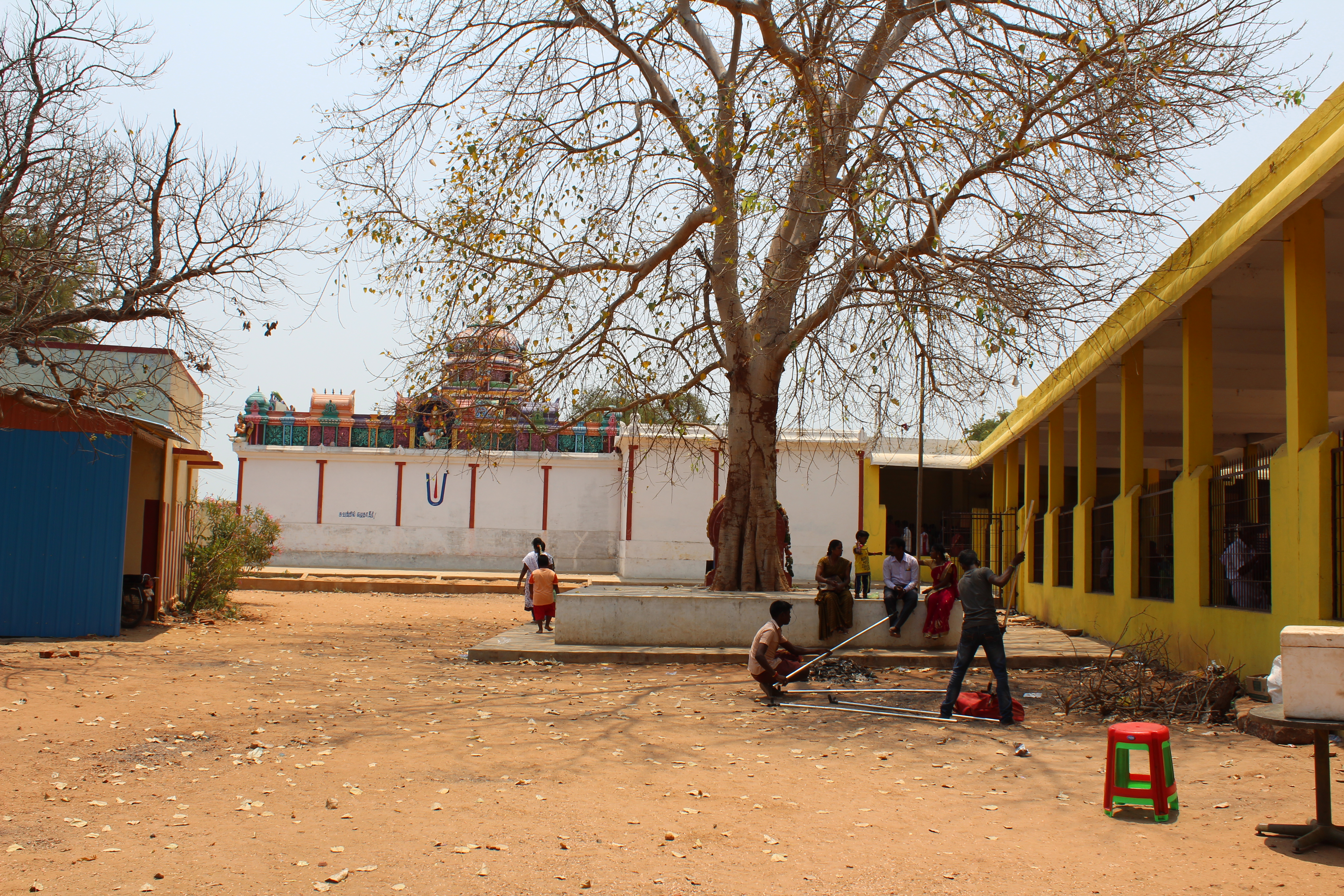
Image of Lakshmi Hayagriva temple uphill

The temple is located on the foothills of Outshadagiri, a small hill, which houses the temple of Hayagriva. The river Kedilam, located on the other side of the temple flows from south to north and is locally called Uttaravahini. The temple built in Dravidian Architecture, is the only Vishnu temple built on the banks of the river, while there are a few prominent Shiva temples. A granite wall surrounds the temple, enclosing all its shrines and bodies of water. The temples faces east, but the rajagopuram, the temple's gateway tower, is located on the western entrance and has five tiers and raises to a height of 60 ft (18 m). The image of the presiding deity, Devanathaswamy, is housed in the central shrine. The sanctum also houses the image the consort, Senkamalavalli Thayar (also called Hemabhujavalli, Vaikunta Nayagi and Amruthavarshini) in sitting posture. The festival images of Vishnu, called by different names like Moovaraghia oruvan, Achuta, Dvistantha, Devanatha, Vibhuthanatha and Dasyatha, is housed in the sanctum. The temple houses the images of other deities like Pallikonda Perumal, Andal, AdiKesava Perumal, Alvars, Hanumar and Garuda. There is a separate shrine housing Rama, though the presiding deity is Devanathaswamy, the temple is known for Hayagriva, the horse faced avatar of Vishnu. The images of Garuda and Hanuman are depicted in unique postures of Anajalihasta, which is different compared to all other temples. The temple is the only historical temple in South India to have a shrine of Hayagriva.

== Festivals and religious practices ==
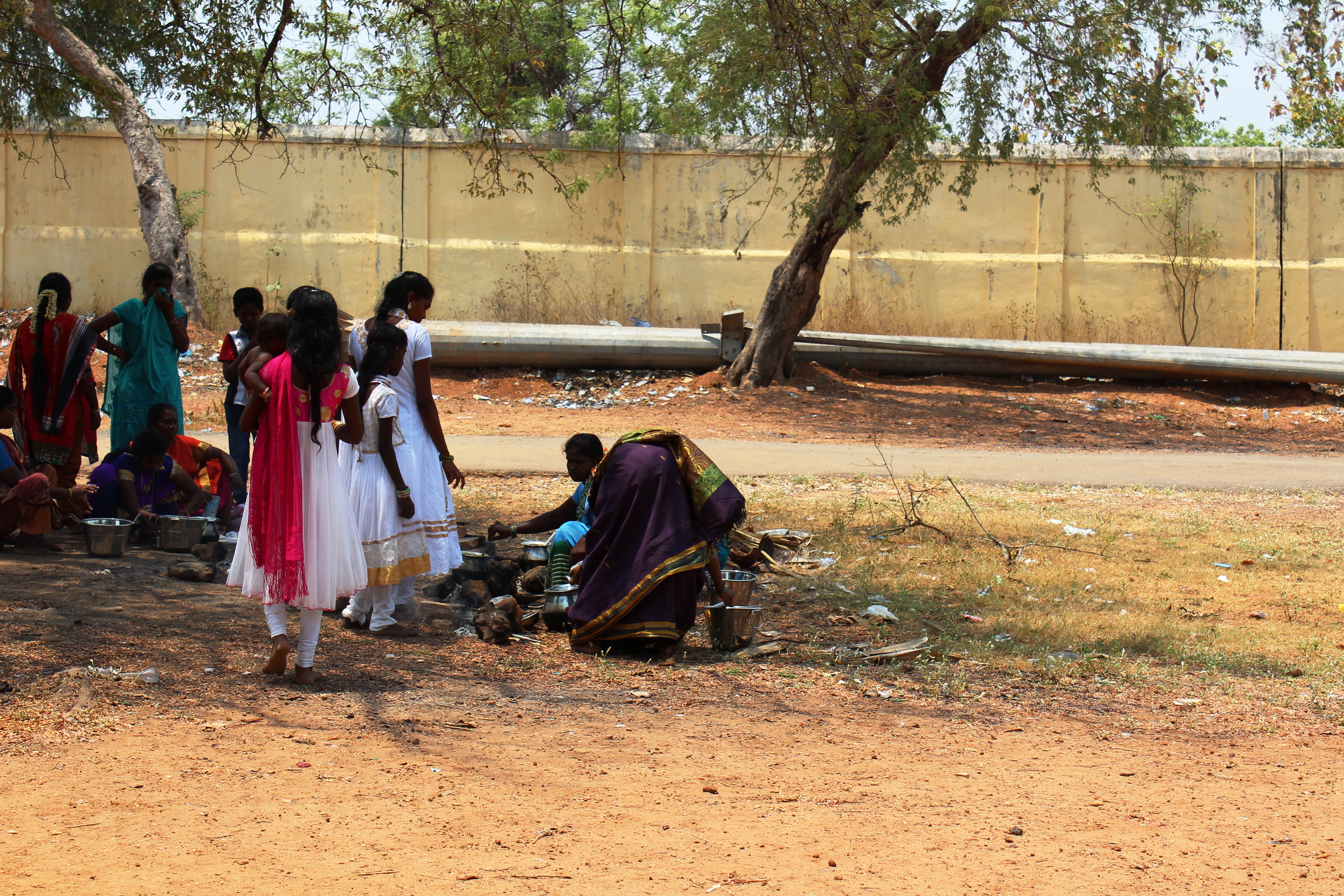
Women cook food and offer to the deity

The temple priests perform the pooja (rituals) as per Vadakalai sampradayam during festivals and on a daily basis (Vaikashasana Agama). As at other Vishnu temples of Tamil Nadu, the priests belong to the Vaishnavaite community, a Brahmin sub-caste. The temple rituals are performed six times a day: Ushatkalam at 7 a.m., Kalashanti at 8:00 a.m., Uchikalam at 12:00 p.m., Sayarakshai at 6:00 p.m., Irandamkalam at 7:00 p.m. and Ardha Jamam at 10:00 p.m. Each ritual has three steps: alankaram (decoration), naivedyam (food offering) and deepa aradhanai (waving of lamps) for both Neelamegha Perumal and Tirukannapura Nayagi. During the last step of worship, nagaswaram (pipe instrument) and tavil (percussion instrument) are played, religious instructions in the Vedas (sacred text) are recited by priests, and worshippers prostrate themselves in front of the temple mast. There are weekly, monthly and fortnightly rituals performed in the temple.

The major festival, the twelve-day Brahmotsavam is celebrated during the Tamil month of Chittirai (April - May). Rathotsavam, the temple car is drawn during the ninth day of the festival. Masi Mahotsavam is another ten-day festival during the Tamil month of Masi (February - March). During the festival, the festival image is taken in procession to the seashore in Cuddalore. There are religious discourses, musical performances and floats organized during the festival. The other Vaishnavite festivals like Krishna Janmashtami, Karthigai, Tamil New Year, Margali ten-day festival, Sankaranthi, Panguni Uthiram and Rohini Utsavam are celebrated. The temple is a renowned pilgrim centre and devotees tonsure their heads during auspicious occasions. Marriages are also performed in the premises.

== Religious significance ==
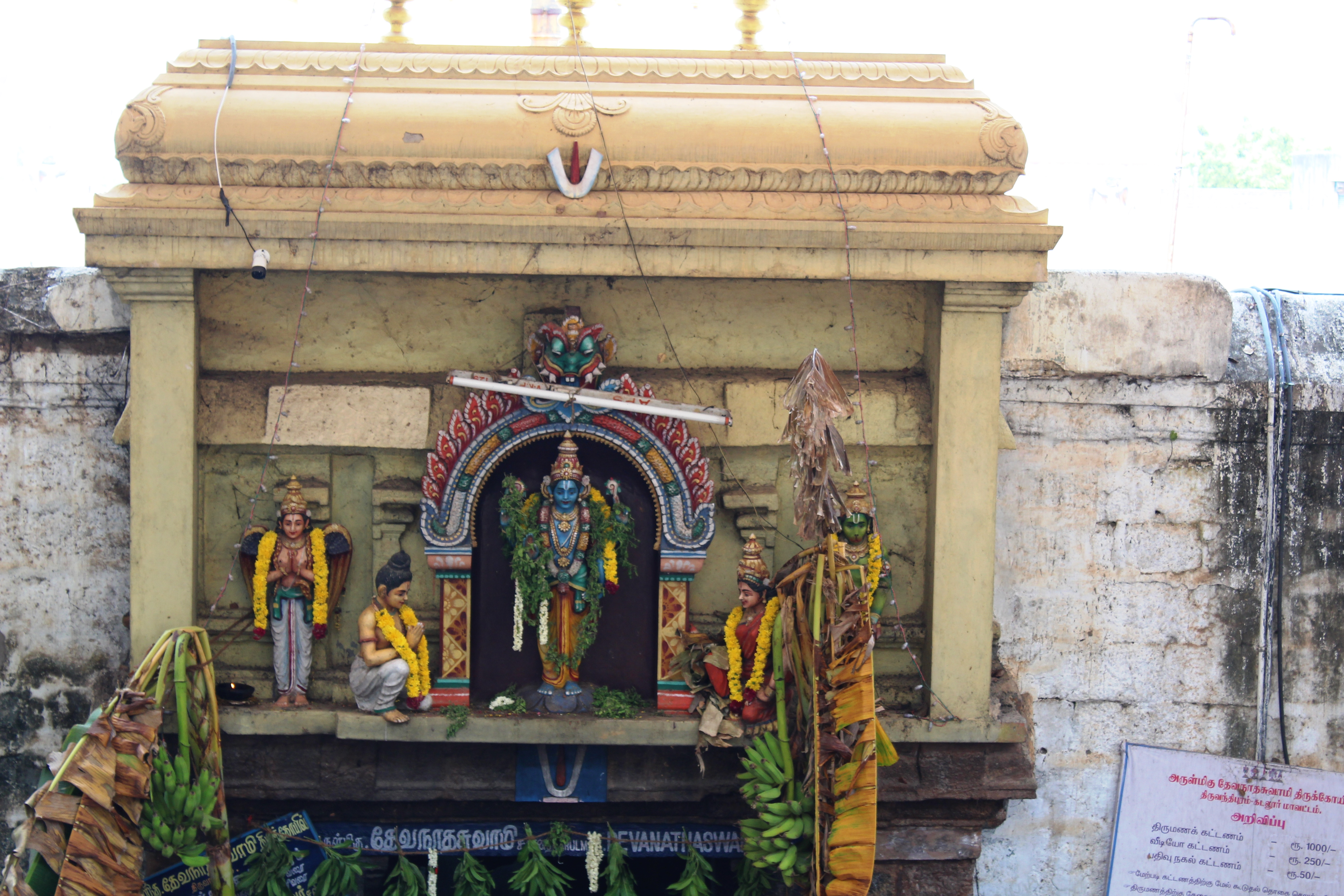
Plaque of the presiding deity in the sanctum

The temple is revered in Nalayira Divya Prabandham, the 7th–9th century Vaishnava canon, by Thirumangai Alvar in eleven hymns. The temple is classified as a Divya Desam, one of the 108 Vishnu temples that are mentioned in the book. Thirumangai mentions about the location of the temple under the foothills and glorified the scenic location surrounding the temple. He also mentions the various avatars of Vishnu. Srivillputhurar, in his Villibharatam narrates that the temple was visited by Arjuna, the Pandava prince during his pilgrimage. Divya Kavi Pillai Perumal Aiyangar in his Ashta Prabanda states that heavens shower flowers on the devotees of the temple.

The presiding deity is sported with two hands holding conch and discuss in his two hands signifying Vishnu, lotus indicating Brahma and a third eye as Shiva. Indra performed Vaishnava Yagna at this place to worship Vishnu to win over the demon king Vritasura. Vishnu gave him the Vajrayudha after which Indra came out of hiding and slayed the demon.

Vedanta Desika, a proponent of Vaishanvadatta philosophy and Vadakalai tradition is associated with the temple. He lived up to the age of 102 years and spent most of his time in the temple. He is attributed to two works in Sanskrit, namely Devaneya Panchasat and Achuta Sataka and seven works in Tamil, namely Mummanikovai, Ammanai, Oosal, Aesal, Navamanimalai, Kalal and Pandu. Almost all of these works have indirect and direct mention of the temple. The image of Vedanta Desikar is housed in a separate shrine, with a separate dvajasthambam, a flagstaff. Desika has also praised Rama, whose shrine is located in the temple, in his works in Raghuvira Gadayam.

The temple is the only historical temple in South India to house an image of Hayagriva, an avatar of Vishnu with a horse-face. Two asuras known as Madhu and Kaitabha, are believed to have taken the Vedas away from the world. Brahma sought the help of Vishnu who propitiated in the form of Hayagriva, and Hayagriva killed both Madhu and Kaitabha and restored the Vedas to Brahma. Hayagriva is believed to be the god of knowledge and wisdom, who is believed to have restored the Vedas to Brahma. Hayagriva is also called Hayavadhana. Vedanta Desika has eulogized Hayagriva in his works.
