= Petthanaikankuppam =

Petthanaikankuppam is a revenue village in Cuddalore district in state of Tamil Nadu, India.
