= Padirikuppam =

- city
- Location in Tamil Nadu, India Padirikuppam (India)
- Coordinates: 11°45′48″N 79°44′08″E
- Country: India
- State: Tamil Nadu
- District: Cuddalore

Population (2001)
  - Total: 14,986

Languages
  - Official: Tamil
- Time zone: UTC+5:30 (IST)

Padirikuppam is a Neighborhood of Cuddalore in Cuddalore district in the Indian state of Tamil Nadu.

== Demographics ==
As of 2001 India census, Padirikuppam had a population of 14,986. Males constitute 50% of the population and females 50%. Padirikuppam has an average literacy rate of 80%, higher than the national average of 59.5%: male literacy is 85%, and female literacy is 75%. In Padirikuppam, 10% of the population is under 6 years of age.
