= Perumudivakkam =

Coordinates: 13.2521°N 80.0775°E

Perumudivakkam is a small village on the outskirts of Chennai, and a developing residential area in North Chennai, a metropolitan city in Tamil Nadu, India. It is Located Northwest Chennai in Tiruvallur District near to the proposed Smart City Ponneri.

== Transport ==
It is 29 km from the Chennai Koyambedu terminus and 10 km from Red Hills Bus Terminus.

== Religion ==
Perumudivakkam has a temple for Sri KothandaRama and the temple is connected with Ramayana. The 100 year old Sri kaiveachu Parvathi parameshwar temple is also located in the village.
