= Vellapakkam =

Vellapakkam is a village in the Cuddalore district of the Indian state of Tamil Nadu. Vellapakkam local languages are Tamil and English and its Pincode is 607109. Vellapakkam total population is 3185 and female population around 1622 and child population around 401 where no. of girls child are 205.
