= Periyakankanankuppam =

Village in Tamil Nadu, India

Periyakankanankuppam is a village in Cuddalore district of the Indian state of Tamil Nadu, India.
