= Melalinjipattu =

Melalinjipattu Thiruvanthipuram is one of the revenue village in Cuddalore district of Tamil Nadu, India.
