= Thottapattu =

Thottapattu is one of the revenue village in Cuddalore district of Indian state, Tamil Nadu.
