= Uchimedu =

Village in Tamil Nadu, India

Coordinates: 12°58′N 79°55′E

Uchimedu (Tamil: உச்சிமேடு) is a village in the Cuddalore district of the Indian state of Tamil Nadu.
