= Varakalpattu =

Coordinates: 11°46′N 79°42′E

Varakalpattu is a revenue village in Cuddalore district, Tamil Nadu, India.
