= Vanathirayapuram =

Village in Cuddalore, Tamil Nadu, India

Vanadirayapuram is a village in the Kurinjipadi Taluk of Cuddalore District, Tamil Nadu, in India. It is a village panchayat that includes the villages of Therkumelur, Thenkuthu, Moolakuppam, Thenkuthu Puthu Nagar, Pinnachi Kuppam, and Kallu Khuzhi. The village is located between the Vadalur and Neyveli township. Economically, the village mainly depends on agriculture income and cropping across the year.

== Politics ==
The village is part of the Neyveli State Legislative Assembly constituency and Cuddalore Lok Sabha constituency.

- Current MLA - Saba Rajendran (Dravida Munnetra Kazhagam)
- Current MP - M. K. Vishnu Prasad (Indian National Congress party)

== Temples ==
Popular religious places around the villages are:

- Shri Arulmigu Angala Parameswari and Pavadairayan Temple, which is more than 200 years old. An oonjal (swing) festival is performed every Pournami (full moon) day. An annual 10-day festival is celebrated during the month of Chithirai.
- Velludaiyanpattu Murugan Temple, where a festival popularly known as Panguni Uthiram is celebrated every year in the month of March or April, depending on the Tamil calendar.
