= Virupatchi =

Virupatchi is a small village in Tamil Nadu, India which is 2 km away from the Kurinjipadi Perumal Temple.
