= Villianur commune =

Coordinates: 11°54′50.96″N 79°45′20.17″E

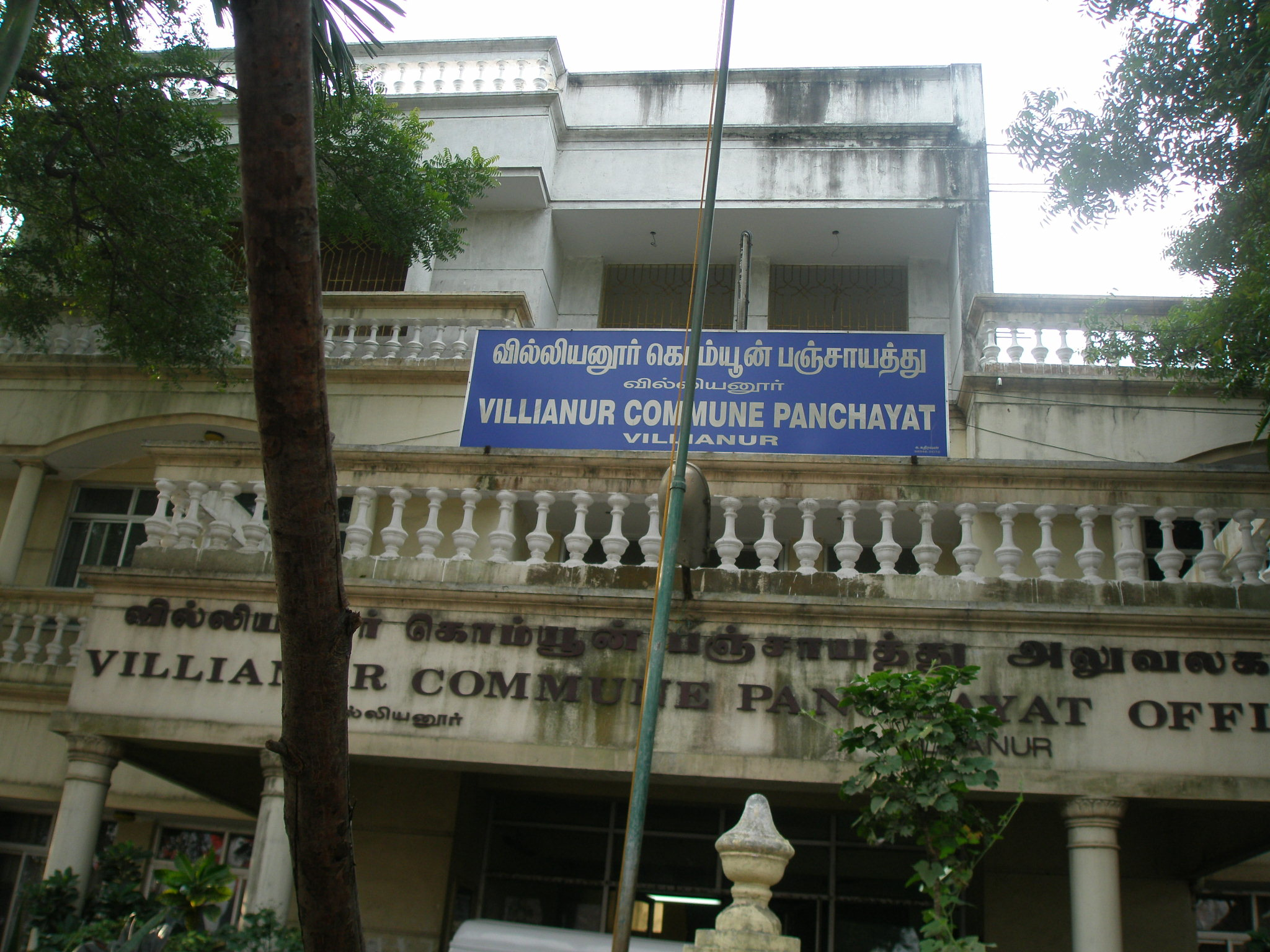
Villianur Commune Panchayat Office

Villianur is one of 5 Communes in Pondicherry district in the Indian territory of Puducherry. Villianur Commune comes under Villianur Taluk Of Puducherry District. Mannadipet is another commune under Villianur Taluk. Villianur Commune consists of 1 Census Town and 17 Panchayat Villages.

== Census Towns ==
Urban area under Villianur Commune consists of one census town, viz. Villianur and one Gram Panchayat, viz. Kurumbapet.

== Panchayat villages ==
The following are 17 panchayat villages under Villianur Commune:

- Ariyur
- Kanuvapet
- Koodapakkam
- Kottaimedu
- Manavely
- Mangalam
- Odiampet
- Pillaiyarkuppam
- Poraiyur Agaram
- Manakuppam
- Sathamangalam
- Sedarapet
- Sivaranthagam
- Sulthanpet
- Thirukanchi
- Thondamanatham
- Uruvaiyar
