= Vilangalpattu =

Village in Cuddalore, Tamil Nadu

Vilangalpattu is a village in the Cuddalore district of the Indian state of Tamil Nadu.
