= Vellakarai =

Thiruvanthipuram is a revenue village in Cuddalore district of Tamil Nadu, India.
