= Nandyal Rural mandal =

- Mandal
- Interactive map of Nandyal Rural mandal
- Location in Andhra Pradesh, India
- Coordinates: 15.48°N 78.48°E
- Country: India
- State: Andhra Pradesh
- District: Nandyal
- Headquarters: Nandyal

Languages
  - Official: Telugu
- Time zone: UTC+5:30 (IST)
- Vehicle registration: AP

Nandyal Rural mandal is a mandal in Nandyal district of Andhra Pradesh, India. It was formed on 8 May 2023 by division of Nandyal mandal.

== Towns and Villages ==
1. Bheemavaram
2. Brahmanapalli
3. Chabolu
4. Chapirevula
5. Guntanala
6. Kanala
7. Kottala
8. Mitnala
9. Munagala
10. Poluru
11. Pulimaddi
12. Pusuluru
13. Rayamalpuram
