= Mahatma Gandhi Medical College and Research Institute =

Medical college in Puducherry, India

- Collège médical et institut de recherche Mahatma Gandhi
- Other name: MGMCRI
- Motto: Torches pour demain (French)
- Motto in English: Torches For Tomorrow
- Type: Deemed Trust Medical University
- Established: 2001; 25 years ago
- Academic affiliations: Sri Balaji Vidyapeeth University
- Dean: Dr. Seetesh Ghose
- Undergraduates: 250 per year (MBBS) since 2014
- Postgraduates: 169 per year
- Location: SBV Campus, Pillayarkuppam, Pondicherry 607 402, India, Bahour, Puducherry, India; 11.81207°N 79.77805°E
- Campus: Urban, 27 acres (0.11 km^{2})
- Website: http://www.mgmcri.ac.in

Mahatma Gandhi Medical College and Research Institute (MGMCRI) (French: Collège médical et institut de recherche Mahatma Gandhi) is a medical college and hospital located in the Bahour taluk, Puducherry, India. According to National Institutional Ranking Framework (NIRF) Ranking 2024, MGMCRI ranked 47 among all medical institution categories in India which run by the Institution of Sri Balaji Educational and Charitable Public Trust (SBECPT), was founded by chairman, Shri M.K. Rajagopalan. Admission in MBBS here is solely through NEET UG/PG on merit list basis which is being provided by the Medical Counselling Committee (MCC) a body of Directorate General of Health Services (DGHS) affiliated to the Ministry of Health and Family Welfare, Government of India.

The institution was recognized by the National Medical Commission. M.G.M.C.R.I was previously affiliated to Pondicherry University but later M.G.M.C.R.I was recognized as a Deemed University by University Grants Commission, New Delhi, on 4 August 2008 and it is part of Sri Balaji Vidyapeeth University.

The campus is situated at Pillayarkuppam, 14 kilometres (8.7 mi) from the city of Pondicherry, near the town of Cuddalore.

== History ==
In building this institution, Mr. M. K. Rajagopal, the young chairman, was assisted by Prof. Rajaram Pagadala, an eminent medical teacher, CEO and dean of the MGMCRI. Prof. Rajaram had the experience of having been the dean of three other medical schools, including JIPMER in Pondicherry, College of Medical Sciences, Bharatpur in Nepal and Alluri Sita Ramaraju Academy of Medical sciences (ASRAM) in Eluru in Andhra Pradesh. He was decorated by the President of India as an Eminent Medical teacher of India and was awarded with Dr. B.C. Roy Award in 1993.

Dr DS Dubey took charge as the director and dean of the institution in 2002. Dr Dubey, an excellent administrator, teacher and clinician, had served as director of many institutions across India, including JIPMER. He also served as an inspector to the prestigious Medical Council of India. It was during his tenure the institution took complete shape and received international reputation. The period referred to as The Golden Period of MGMCRI. He held the office till the first batch of MBBS students passed out of the institution. Dr James Gnanadoss served as the director of the institute after the tenure of Dr Dubey.The first batch of this college started in 2002 April. Post graduate teaching began in April 2007. Its alumni association came into existence on 16 August 2007 and is known as Mahathma Gandhi Medical College and Research Institute Fraternity (MGMCRI Fraternity).

== Ranking ==
University and college rankings

Medical – India
- NIRF (2024): 47

== See also ==
- List of medical colleges in India
- Mahatma Gandhi Institute of Medical Sciences
