= Cuddalore taluk =

Taluk of Cuddalore district of the Indian state of Tamil Nadu

Coordinates: 11.75°N 79.75°E

Cuddalore taluk is a taluk of Cuddalore district of the Indian state of Tamil Nadu. The headquarters of the taluk is the town of Cuddalore.

== Demographics ==
According to the 2011 census, the taluk of Cuddalore had a population of 426,017 with 212,878 males and 213,139 females. There were 1,001 women for every 1,000 men. The taluk had a literacy rate of 74.52%. Population below the age of 6 was 21,233 males and 19,770 females.

== Revenue Villages ==
There are 84 revenue villages present under Cuddalore taluk.

List of Revenue Villages
SI.No	Name of Revenue Village
1	Alapakkam
2	Andarmullipallam
3	Annavalli
4	Arisiperiyankuppam
5	Azhagiyanatham
6	Cuddalore
7	Cuddalore O.T (municipal)
8	Irandayeeravilagam
9	Kalaiyur
10	Kambilimedu
11	Kangamanayakkankuppam
12	Karaikaddu
13	Karaimedu
14	Karaiyerivittakuppam
15	Karaiyerivittakuppam (municipal)
16	Karamanikuppam
17	Karanapattu
18	Karupadithundu
19	Kayalpattu
20	Keez Azhinjipattu
21	Keez Kumaramangalam
22	Kilinjikuppam
23	Kondur (municipal)
24	Koothapakkam
25	Kothandaramapuram
26	Kudikadu
27	Kumarapettai
28	Kunamangalam
29	Kundu-uppalavadi
30	Malayaaperumal Agaram
31	Manjakuppam
32	Maruthadu
33	Mathalapattu
34	Mavadipalayam
35	Melakuppam
36	Melazhinjipattu
37	Naduveerapattu
38	Nagappanur
39	Nallathur
40	Nathapattu
41	Odalappattu
42	Otteri
43	Pachaiyankuppam
44	Pallipattu
45	Pathirikuppam
46	Periyakanganamkuppam
47	Pillali
48	Ponniyankuppam
49	Pudukadai
50	Ramapuram
51	Sedapalayam
52	Sellancheri
53	Sellankuppam
54	Semmankuppam
55	Senjikumarapuram
56	Sennapannayakkanpalayam
57	Singarakudi
58	Sinnakanganamkuppam
59	Suba Uppalavadi
60	Thennampakkam
61	Thevanampattinam
62	Thiruchopuram
63	Thirumanikuzhi
64	Thirupanampakkam
65	Thirupapuliyur
66	Thiruvanthipuram
67	Thiyagavalli
68	Thookkanampakkam
69	Thookkanampakkam
70	Thottapattu
71	Uchimedu
72	Ulleripattu
73	Utharamanikam
74	Vadapuram Keezhpathi
75	Vanamadevi (n)
76	Vanamadevi (s)
77	Vannarapalayam
78	Varakkalapattu
79	Velisemmandalam
80	Vellakarai
81	Vellapakkam
82	Vettukulam
83	Villankalpattu
84	Vilvarayanatham
