= Revenue Village =

Small administrative region in India

A Revenue Village is a small administrative region in India, a village with defined borders. One revenue village may contain many hamlets. Each revenue village is headed by a Village Administrative Officer (VAO) or Village Accountant, or Village Officer.

== History ==
Historically in Mughal India, it was called as Mouza in the Persian language, and still used today in Hindustani and other Indic languages, assimilated as Mauja. The advent of the concept revenue village dates back to the system of land reform introduced by Raja Todar Mal, minister of revenue in the court of Emperor Akbar. The essence of the reform was the assessment of the land revenue according to the extent of cultivation, the nature of the soil and the quality of the crops. In the 18th century, the Marathas were to excel in the preparation of area maps of revenue villages for the aid of native rulers. Though at times the system broke down and was deployed unevenly within the Mughal Empire, it was the underlying basis of the later day revenue system introduced in British Indian administration.

The revenue village was and is still designed as the lowest administrative unit in the settlement hierarchy. It was designed to improve and regulate the revenue collection mechanism, not for village planning and development.
