= Pondicherry University =

Central university in Kalapet, Puducherry (union territory), India

- Seal of Pondicherry University
- Motto: तमसो मा ज्योतिर्गमय (Sanskrit)
- Motto in English: From Darkness, towards the Light!
- Type: Central Research University
- Established: 1985; 41 years ago
- Accreditation: NAAC Accredited With Grade 'A+'
- Affiliations: UGC; NMC; BCI; PCI; AICTE; ICSSR; ICMR; ICAR
- Chancellor: Vice President of India
- Vice-Chancellor: Phanithi Prakash Babu
- Rector: Lieutenant Governor of Puducherry
- Visitor: President of India
- Students: 40,804
- Undergraduates: 35,000
- Postgraduates: 4,642
- Doctoral students: 1,800
- Location: Kalapet, Pondicherry, India; 12°00′57″N 79°51′31″E
- Campus: Urban, 1000 acres
- Colours
- Mascot: Lotus
- Website: www.pondiuni.edu.in

Pondicherry University, also known as PU, is a central research university located in Kalapet, Pondicherry, India. It was established by an Act of Parliament in 1985 by the Department of Higher Education, Ministry of Education, Government of India. The Vice President of India is the Chancellor along with the Lieutenant Governor of Puducherry acting as the Chief Rector and the President of India is the Visitor of the university.

The university is a collegiate university with its jurisdiction spread over the Union Territory of Puducherry located in Tamil Nadu (Pondicherry and Karaikal), Kerala (Mahé) and Andhra Pradesh (Yanam), and Union Territory of Andaman and Nicobar Islands. The vast jurisdiction over three Union Territories namely gives the university a national character. The residents speak diverse languages such as English, Tamil, Telugu, Malayalam, Hindi, Bengali, Odia, Assamese, Kannada and French.

Local skill sets are advanced through several vocational programs such as paramedical courses using the on-site hospital facilities.

== Campus ==
Pondicherry University is located on a campus spread over around 1,000 acres (400 ha), facing the Bay of Bengal on the East Coast Road. It is accessible from Chennai (168 km [104 mi]) and Bengaluru (326 km [203 mi]).

Hostel facilities are available on the campus for both males and females. Students from distant places will be given preference on a first-come, first-served basis. The university has a hostel for foreign students that can accommodate more than 30 students. Girls are given rent-free accommodation. All physically challenged students get free education, including free board and lodging in hostels. The university provides free transport off campus and within campus. The university which was in B grade for 20 years, in 2007–2012, when Prof. J. A. K. Tareen was vice chancellor. Over 300 new faculty and 22 new departments were started and new campuses at Karaikal and Andaman. It became an A grade, and in the first NIRF ranking, it came in the top 11 of Indian universities.

== Organisation and administration ==
=== Schools, departments and centres ===
The entire academic structure was reorganized during the tenure of Prof J. A. K. Tareen, who established over 20 new departments and new schools with over 80 new programs. The university has 14 schools and 52 departments distributed across Pondicherry and Karaikal campus. The following is the list of the schools, departments and centres:

==== Subramania Bharathi School of Tamil Language and Literature ====
- Tamil Language & Literature

==== School of Management ====
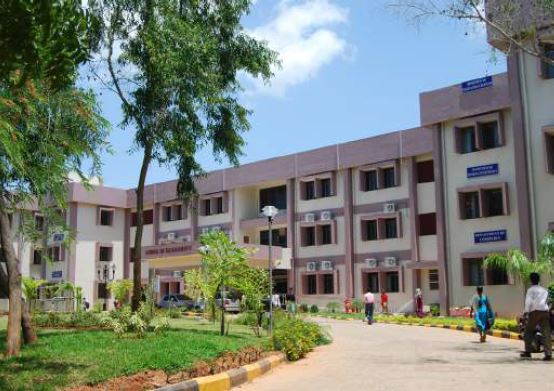
School of Management

- Department of Management Studies
- Department of Commerce
- Department of Economics
- Department of Tourism Studies
- Department of Banking Technology
- Department of International Business

Karaikal Campus

- Department of Management
- Department of Commerce
- Department of Computer Science

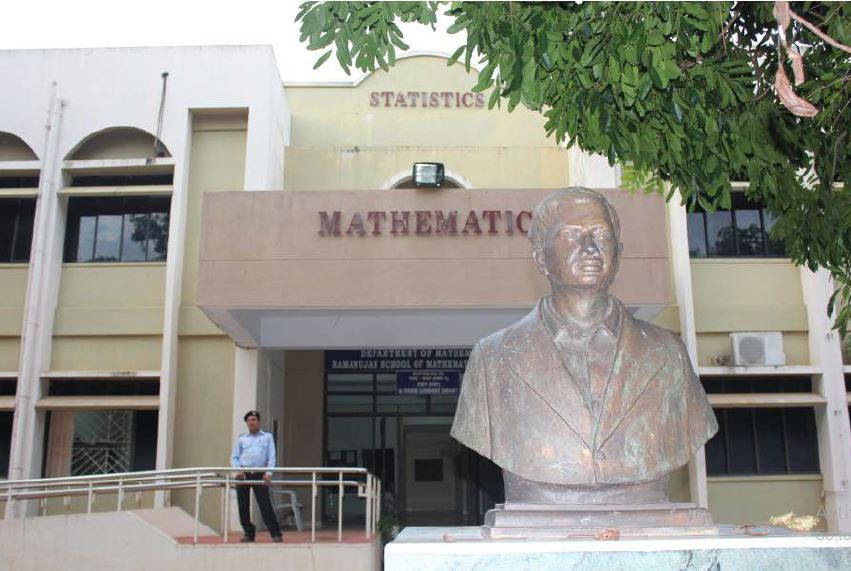
Ramanujan School of Mathematical Sciences

==== Ramanujan School of Mathematical Sciences ====
- Department of Mathematics
- Department of Statistics

==== School of Engineering & Technology ====
- Computer Science
- Electronics Engineering
- Centre for Pollution Control & Environmental Engineering
- Coastal Engineering
- Geological Technology

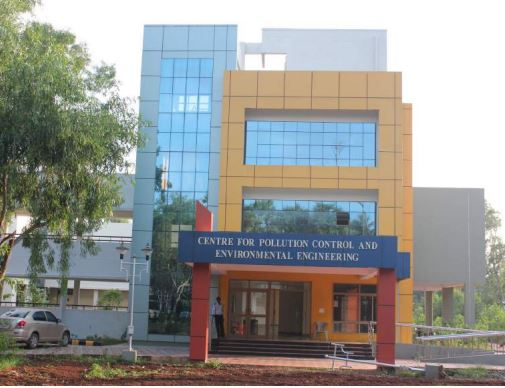
Centre for Pollution Control and Environmental Engineering

==== School of Physical, Chemical and Applied Sciences ====
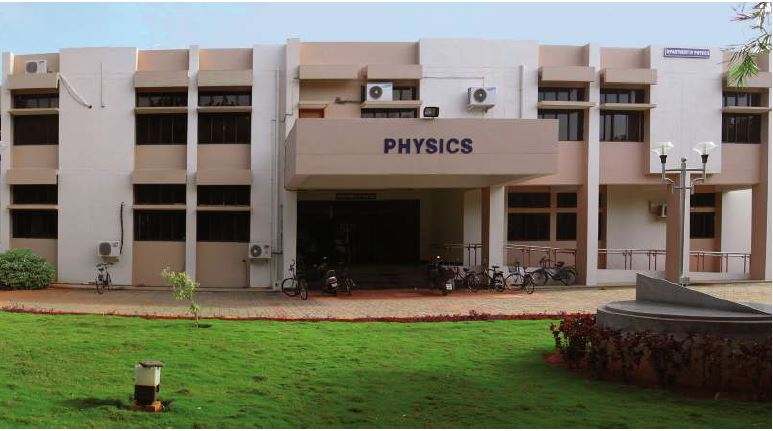
Department of Physics

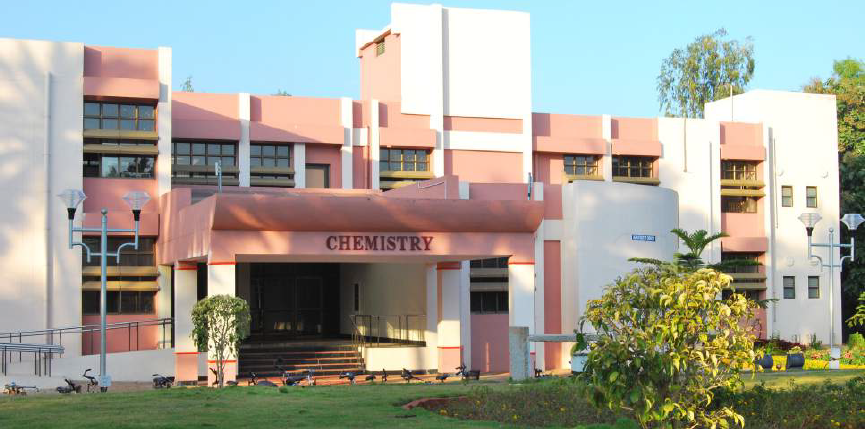
Department of Chemistry

- Department of Physics
- Department of Chemistry
- Department of Earth Sciences
- Department of Applied Psychology
- Department of Coastal Disaster Management (Sri Vijaya Puram)

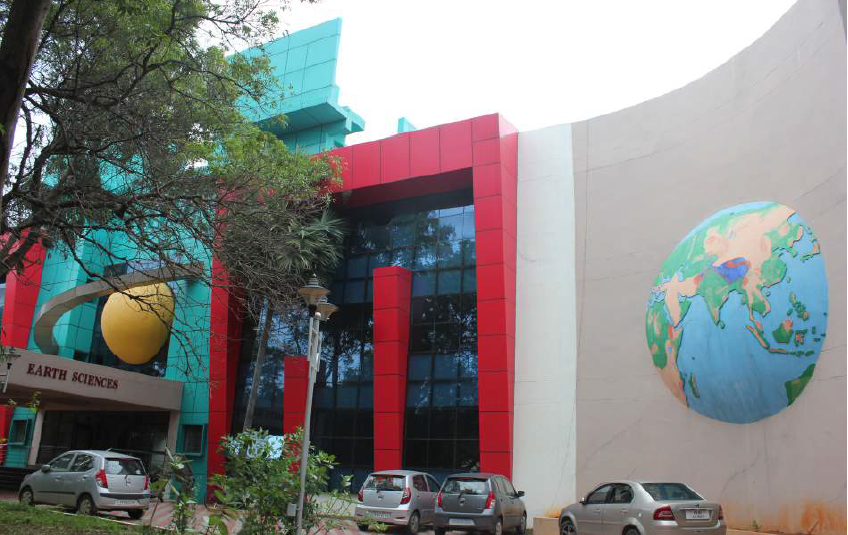
Department of Earth Science

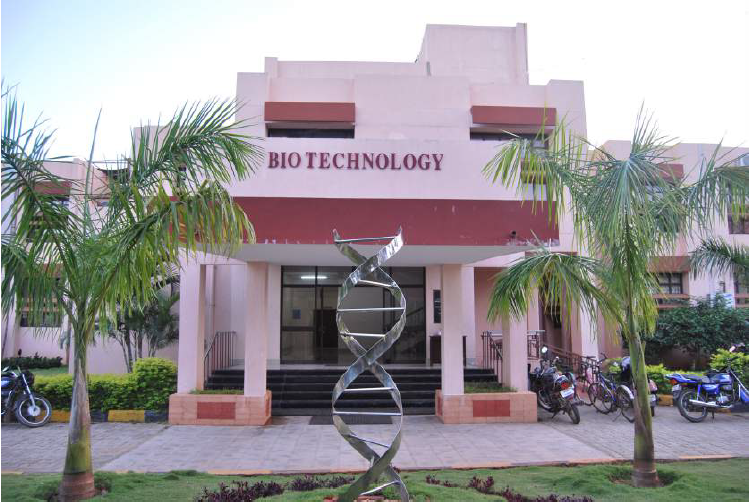
Department of Biotechnology

==== School of Life Sciences ====
- Department of Bioinformatics
- Department of Biotechnology
- Department of Ecology & Environmental Sciences
- Department of Ocean Studies and Marine Biology (Sri Vijaya Puram)
- Department of Food Science & Technology
- Department of Biochemistry & Molecular Biology
- Department of Microbiology

==== School of Humanities ====
- Department of English and comparative literature
- Department of French
- Department of Hindi
- Department of Sanskrit
- Department of Philosophy
- Department of Physical Education & Sports

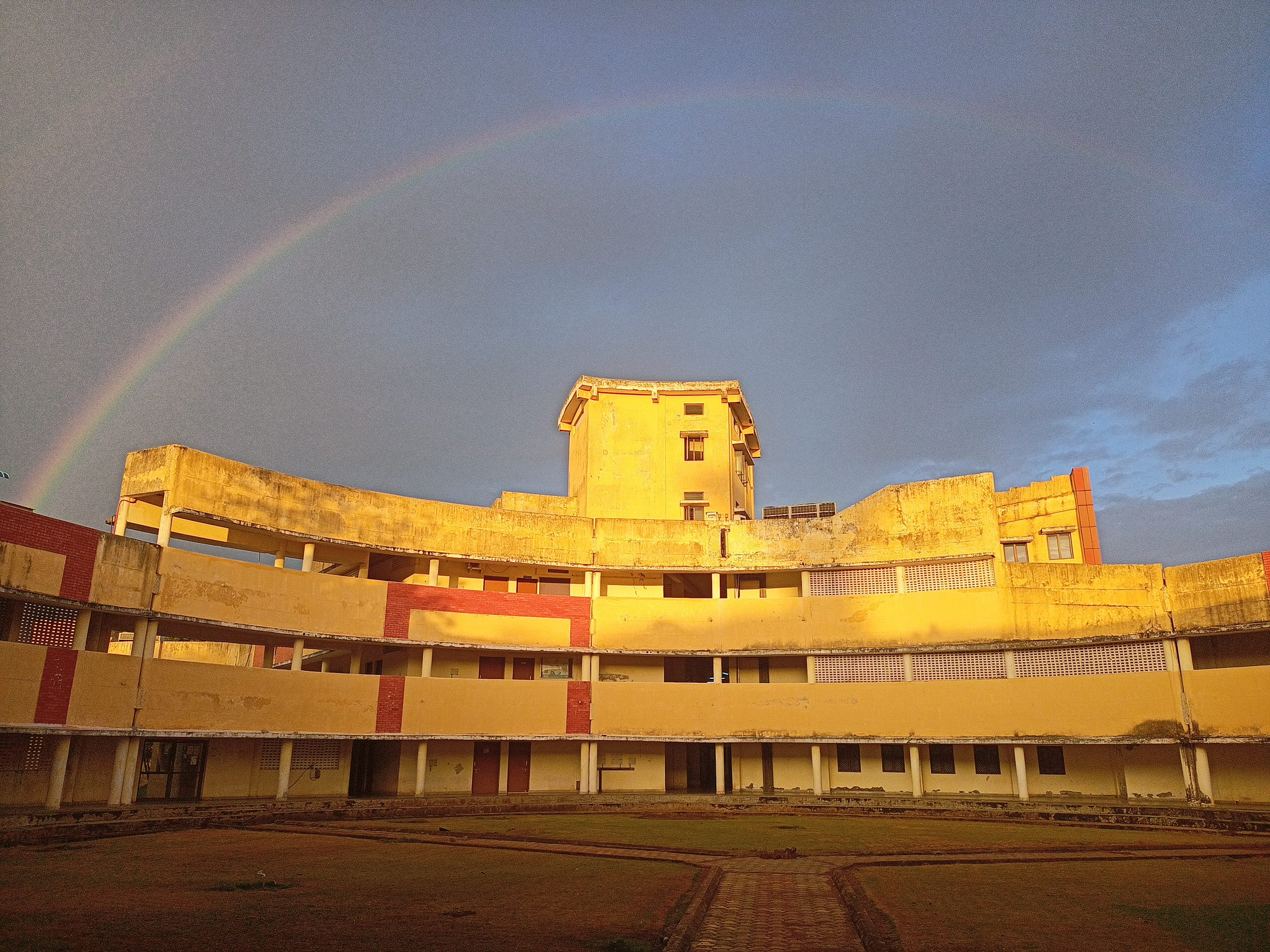
Silver Jubilee Campus, which houses the Schools of Humanities and Social Sciences

==== School of Social Sciences and International Studies ====
- Anthropology
- Archaeology
- History
- Politics and International Studies
- Social Work
- Sociology
- Centre for Women's Studies
- Madanjeet Singh Institute of South Asia Regional Cooperation – Centre for South Asian Studies*
- Centre for Study of Social Exclusion & Inclusive Policy*

These centres were established during XII plan when Prof J A K Tareen was vice chancellor.

==== School of Education ====
- School of Education
- Centre for Adult and Continuing Education

==== School of Media & Communication ====
- Library & Information Science
- Department of Electronic Media and Mass Communication

==== Madanjeet School of Green Energy Technologies ====
- Centre for Nano Science & Technology
- Department of Green Energy Technology

=== List of affiliated colleges ===
- Achariya Arts and Science College
- Andaman and Nicobar Islands Institute of Medical Sciences
- Dr. B. R. Ambedkar Institute of Technology
- Arignar Anna Government Arts College
- Avvaiyar Government College for Women
- Bharathidasan Government College for Women
- Bharathiar Palkalaikoodam
- Dr. S. R. K. Government Arts College
- Idhaya College of Arts and Science for Women
- Indira Gandhi College of Arts and Science
- Indira Gandhi Medical College and Research Institute
- Jawaharlal Nehru Rajkeeya Mahavidyalaya
- Kanchi Mamunivar Centre for Post Graduate Studies
- Mahatma Gandhi Government Arts College, Mahe
- Mahatma Gandhi Government College
- Perunthalaivar Kamarajar Government Arts College
- Rathnavel Subramaniam College of Arts and Science
- Saradha Gangadharan College
- Tagore Government College of Arts and Science
- Tagore Arts College (Annexe)
- Villianur College for Women
- Dr Ambedkar Government Law College
- R V S College of Engineering and Technology
- Perunthalaivar Kamarajar Institute of Engineering and Technology
- Bharathiar College of Engineering and Technology
- Pondicherry Engineering College
- Rajiv Gandhi College of Engineering and Technology
- Regency Institute of Technology
- Sri Venkateshwaraa Medical College Hospital and Research Centre
- College of Nursing
- Kasturba Gandhi College of Nursing
- Mahatma Gandhi Dental College and Hospital
- Mother Teresa Institute of Health Sciences
- Pondicherry Institute of Medical Sciences
- Rajiv Gandhi College of Veterinary Animal Sciences
- Regional Medical Research Institute
- Vector Control Research Centre (ICMR)
- Achariya College of Education
- Alpha College of Education
- Arutperunchothi Ramalingasamy College of Education
- Co-operative College of Education
- Don Bosco College of Education and Research Institute
- Immaculate College of Education
- Krishnasamy College of Education for Women
- Mahe Co-operative College of Education
- Mother Teresa BEd College
- Nehru College of Education
- Perunthalaivar Kamarajar College of Education
- Pope John Paul II College of Education
- Regency College of Education
- Senthil College of Education
- Sree Narayana College of Education
- Tagore Government College of Education
- Vasavi College of Education
- Venkateswara College of Education
- Vivekanandha College of Education
- Shri Krishnaa College of Engineering and Technology, Mannadipet, Puducherry
- Sri Manakula Vinayagar Engineering College
- Sri Manakula Vinayagar Medical College and Hospital
- Manakula Vinayagar Institute of Technology
- Sri Manakula Vinayagar Nursing College
- Usha Latchumanan College of Education
- Venkateswara Teacher Training Institute
- Acharya College of Engineering & Technology
- Alpha College of Engineering
- Sri Ganesh College of Engineering and Technology
- Dr. S. J. S. Paul Memorial College of Engineering & Technology
- Pandit Jawaharlal Nehru College of Agriculture and Research Institute

=== Central Instrumentation Facility ===
The Central Instrumentation Facility (CIF) was established in the university as the University Science Instrumentation Centre (USIC) in 1992 under the UGC Plan Scheme. It housed three facilities – Mechanical Shop, Glass blowing Shop and Electrical Shop, to provide support in the repair and servicing of scientific equipment. Fabrication of components for experimental setups is undertaken.

The USIC has executed design, development and fabrication works ranging from custom designed sample holders/cells to electronic instrumentation and control modules.

In 2005, the centre was reorganised into Central Instrumentation Facility under the School of Physical, Chemical and Applied Sciences and analytical instruments are added to provide analytical service, in addition to the workshop facilities.

== Academics ==
=== Function and role ===
Teaching and research are its primary functions as in other Central Universities. It has over 100 affiliated colleges located in Union Territory of Puducherry (Pondicherry in Tamil Nadu, Karaikal in Tamil Nadu, Mahé in Kerala and Yanam in Andhra Pradesh), Union Territory of Lakshadweep, Union Territory of Andaman and Nicobar Islands.

=== Rankings ===
University rankings

General – international
- QS (World) (2025): 1201-1400
- QS (Asia) (2024): 651-700
- Times (World) (2024): 1001-1200
- Times (Asia) (2024): 301-500
- Times (Emerging) (2022): 301–350

General – India
- NIRF (Overall) (2024): 101-150
- NIRF (Universities) (2024): 101-150

Pondicherry University is ranked 1,001–1,200 in the world by the Times Higher Education World University Rankings in 2024 and 301–500 in Asia. The QS World University Rankings of 2025 ranked it ranked it 1201–1,400 in worldwide and 351–400 in Asia.(2024) It was ranked 101–151 in India in both overall and university rankings by the National Institutional Ranking Framework (NIRF) in 2024.

=== Library ===
The university library, named after Ananda Ranga Pillai, was established in September 1986 with one deputy librarian and two assistant librarians. It was moved to the present locale as an independent building in July 1990. The library provides 24/7 remote access to a collection of 4.97 lakh resources, including 2.51 lakh in print and 3.40 lakh in e-resources.

== Clubs and extracurricular activities ==
=== PU SHARE ===
PU SHARE is a community initiated by a group of students from Pondicherry University to share goodness through charity, on and around the university campus. This organization has been active in volunteering for social causes since 2016. Their major aim is to uplift the children at "Snehalayam" (a standalone orphanage near the Pondicherry University campus) by helping them in academics as well as their necessities. A few other programmes organised by them include the monthly food donation drive every month of the academic year, blood donation at nearby hospitals and free tuition classes for kids at the orphanage.

"INSPIRE" is the annual event that aims at promotion as well as fundraising for PU SHARE activities.

=== SPECTRA ===
SPECTRA provides a space for LGBTQIA+ students to share and discuss their experiences. SPECTRA was founded on 15 August 2014 and has been conducting events ever since. One of the first Campus Pride events in India was organized successfully in 2018 at Pondicherry University by SPECTRA.

=== Earth Sciences Club ===
The Earth Sciences Club was founded in September 2013. It conducts field trips, screens documentaries, organize debates, quizzes, treasure hunts, and others. It is also involved with organising the annual event "Mrittika" in the Department of Earth Sciences.

=== Pondicherry University Quiz Society ===
The students started the Pondicherry University Quiz Society (PUQS) in June 2012. The inauguration of PUQS was held on 1 August 2011 in Pondicherry University/Lecture Hall Seminar-I. The event was inaugurated by the Director of Education of Pondicherry University, Prof. M. Ramadass. The first quizmaster of the show was Nikhil Kurien Jacob. The tagline of the Quiz Society is "It's all about Quizzing."

=== Community radio station ===
Puduvai Vaani, the community radio station (CRS) established by Pondicherry University with the support of UGC located in National Capital Territory of Delhi, India. It works under FM 107.8 MHz a frequency, which is currently extended to a catchments area of 20 km (12 mi) radius from the university campus. The test transmission of Puduvai Vaani – Community Radio Station was started on 23 August 2008. This was an initiative by Prof. J. A. K. Tareen. It was inaugurated by Shri V. Narayanasamy, Hon’ble Union Minister of State for Planning & Parliamentary Affairs on 27 December 2008 in the presence of Shri P.Chidambaram, Hon’ble Union Home Minister. The full-time transmission started on 1 January 2009.

=== Silver Jubilee celebrations ===
Official Silver Jubilee logo

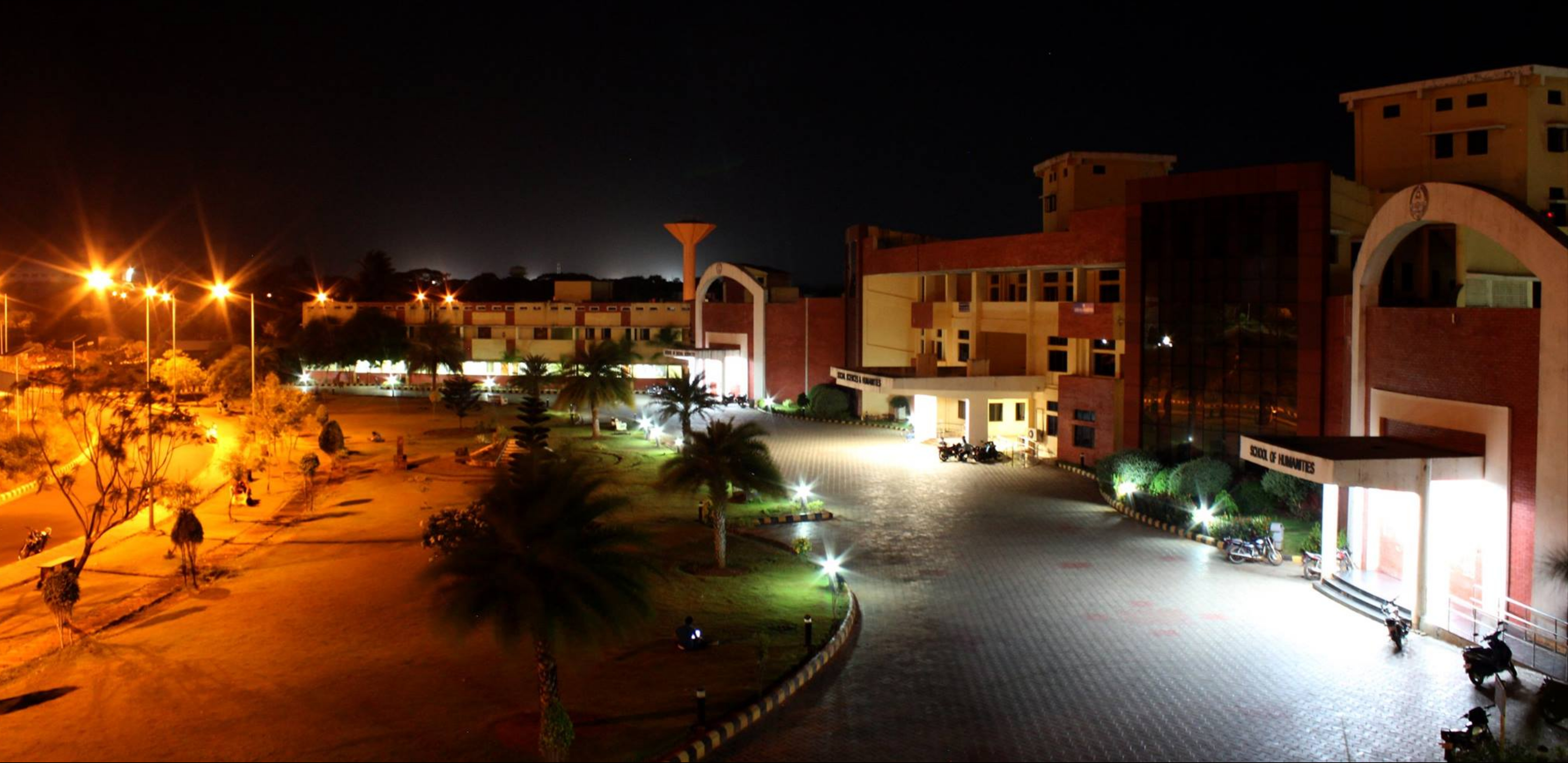
SJ campus

The valedictory of the Silver Jubilee celebrations of Pondicherry University was held on 18 October 2010. Dr. C Rangarajan, Chairman of the Economic Advisory Council to the Prime Minister of India, delivered the keynote address. Lieutenant governor of Puducherry, Iqbal Singh, who was the Chief Rector of the university, was present at the function. Professor J. A. K. Tareen, Vice Chancellor presided over the function.

== Notable alumni ==
- Kodiyeri Balakrishnan — former Home Minister of Kerala
- N. Rangaswamy — 9th Chief Minister of Puducherry
- B. Sandhya, Officer in Indian Police Service
- Jayanthasri Balakrishnan — public speaker and retired professor
- Elango Kumaravel — actor
- Kesava Reddy — writer
- Durai Sundar — Indian computational biologist
- Lijomol Jose — Indian actress
- Jijoy Rajagopal — actor
- Ma Ka Pa Anand — actor
- Annu Antony — actress
- Arulnithi — actor
- Fathima Babu — actress
- Rona Wilson — activist
- Ragy Thomas — CEO of Sprinklr
- Majiziya Bhanu — Indian bodybuilder & dental surgeon
- Pondy Ravi — actor
- Sushrut Badhe — author & researcher
- Pramod Payyannur — Malayalam director and writer
- Ramesh Parambath — member of Puducherry Legislative Assembly
- Murugabhoopathy — playwright
- J. Prakash Kumar — member of Puducherry Legislative Assembly
- Vaseem Iqbal — first tribal person from the Andaman and Nicobar islands to receive a PhD
- R. B. Ashok Babu — member of Puducherry Legislative Assembly
- Suresh Selvarajan — Indian production designer

== In popular culture ==
- '96
- Swapnakoodu
- Ivar Vivahitharayal
- Ko

== See also ==
- Puducherry Technological University
- National Institute of Technology Puducherry
- Jawaharlal Institute of Postgraduate Medical Education and Research
