= Pondicherry District road network =

Road network in India

Pondicherry District (French: Réseau routier du district de Pondichéry) is one of the four districts of Puducherry Union Territory. It has extensive road network. Every village of Pondicherry district is connected by an all-weather metalled road.

== Types of roads ==
Sl. No.	Type of roads	Length (km)
1	National highways	41.98
2	State highways	42.441
3	Major and other district roads	173.384
4	Rural roads (village roads)	164.964
Total length (km)		422.769

== List of roads ==
=== National highways (NH) ===
Sl. No.	NH Number	Route	Length (km)
1	NH-45A	Villupuram - Pondicherry - Cuddalore - Chidambaram - Nagapattinam	38.41
2	NH-66	Pondicherry - Tindivanam - Gingee - Thiruvannamalai - Krishnagiri	20.4
3	NA	ECR from Ganapathy Chettikulam State border to Rajiv Circle on NH-66	13.025 (7.385 km in Puducherry & 5.640 km in Tamil Nadu)

=== State highways (SH) ===
RC roads are the major roads in Puducherry District designated with numbering. RC roads can be compared with state highways. There are 33 RC roads in Puducherry District.

=== Other district roads (ODR) ===
Sl. No.	Description	Length (km)
1	Mission Street, Pondicherry Town	1.4
2	Md. Kasim Salai (Ambour Salai), Pondicherry town	1.7
3	Vallalar Salai, Venkatanagar, Pondicherry	1.15
4	Salai Theru, Muthialpet	0.7
5	Thengaithittu main road connecting Harijan Colony and Thilagar Nagar	2.1
6	Bharathi Street off Valudhavour road at Ananda Nagar	0.86
7	Mathur Road off ECR at Kalapet	7.05
8	Kalathumettu padai off ECR at Ganapathichettikulam (MMMC road)	5.75
9	Raman nagar main road off Lawspet road including internal streets	0.92
10	Pavazhakkaranchavady road off NH45A	1.15
11	Rajaji nagar main road off Lawspet road	0.8
12	Gundusalai and Mariammankoil street off Valudhavour road	1.07
13	Therodum Veedhi off Valudhavour road at Delarshpet	1.16
14	Pillaiyarkoil street off Valudhavour road at Delarshpet	1
15	Iyyanar Koil off street off Valudhavour road at Delarshpet	1
16	Pondicherry Engineering College southern gate road off ECR	1
17	Arts College road off Lawspet road	1.3
18	Delarshpet road connecting Valudhavour road and NH66	0.5
19	Thendral nagar road, Pondicherry	0.56
20	30 feet road from Rajaji nagar main road to Navalar Nedunchezhiar School	0.48
21	Airport road, Pondicherry	1.97

=== Rural and village roads (VR) ===
Sl. No.	Description	Length (km)
1	Thirubuvanai road (MC)	1.6
2	Siruvandadu road (NC)	2.6
3	Kozhipakkam road (NC)	1.155
4	T.N. Palayam road (AC)	3.1
5	Irulanchandai-Sitheri voikal road (BC)	1.6
6	Kuruvinatham road (BC) (Manjolai road)	3.4
7	Sornavour road (BC)	2
8	Road connecting Bahour to Melparikalpet (via) Keezhparikalpet and Aratchikuppam up to State border (Aratchikuppam road) (BC)	3.8
9	Villianur Market street (VC)	0.2
10	Mangalam - Uruvaiyar road (connecting RC18 and RC19) (VC)	1.35
11	Korkadu road (connectint RC18 and RC19) (Korkadu Erikarai road) (VC)	2.25
12	Kosapalayam road branching at Maducarai and connecting Molapakkam road (NC)	0.8
13	Road connecting Kalmandapam to Pandasozhanallur (NC)	2.4
14	Alankuppam road up to State border (OC)	1.72
15	Road connecting from RC7 Suthukeny road to Pudukuppam (MC)	3.565
16	Road branching RC19 Maducarai road and Thondireddipalayam (NC)	1.6
17	Bypass road connecting Cuddalore road (NH45A) and Sakklipalayam (AC)	2.75
18	Cuddalore main road (NH45A) to Pillaiyarthittu, Kasanthittu, Korkadu and Andiyarpalayam (AC)	2.6
19	Cuddalore main road NH45A to Thanampalayam and Nallavadu (AC)	2.2
20	Cuddalore main road to Pudukuppam via Poornankuppam (AC)	
21	Road connecting Pannithittu regulator, Manapet, Moorthikuppam, Pudukuppam, Etchangadu and Pillaiyarkuppam village (BC)	5
22	Cuddalore main road (NH45A) to Narambai (via) Kirumampakkam, Pillayarkuppam (BC)	5
23	Road connecting Pudukuppam and Soriankuppam (via) Koravallimedu, Madhikrishnapalayam, Utchimedu, Sarava Reddy road and Kuruvinatham village (BC)	5
24	Road connecting Manapet, Kanniakoil and Koravallimedu (BC)	5
25	Pondicherry Paper Mills road in Kirumampakkam village (BC)	3
26	Cuddalore main road (NH45A) to Seliamedu (BC)	5
27	Kunichempet to Manalipet road (MC)	2.5
28	Katterikuppam to Lingareddipalayam Sugar Mill branching from RC7 Suthukeny road (MC)	3.4
29	Suthukeny to Pudupalayam road (MC)	3.56
30	Thethampakkam to road connecting Rc4 to RC7 (MC)	2.3
31	Thirubuvanai to Athu Kuchipalayam via Sanyasikuppam (MC)	4
32	Vinayagampet to Sorapet road (MC)	3.3
33	Kunichempet to Chettipet road (MC)	1.7
34	Katterikuppam to Valudhavour up to state border (MC)	2.5
35	Erikarai road from Kalmandapam pet to Pandasozhanallur and branch road top Vadukuppam (NC)	3
36	Approach road from Pondicherry main road (near Sadaikulampet) to Kambilikarankuppam (NC)	3
37	Korkadu erikarai road to Pondicherry main road (NC)	1.2
38	Molapakkam road to Sooramangalam road near OHT (NC)	2.4
39	Link road from Kalmandapam main road to Eripakkam (NC)	2.301
40	Road branching from RC21 frontier road from Eripakkam to Maducarai state border (NC)	5.06
41	Road connecting RC12 Sanyasikuppam road to Rc4 Valudavour road (MC)	3
42	Manavely to Thirukanji road branching from NH45A near Arumparthapuram railway crossing and ending at Kasiviswanathan Temple opposite Indian Oil Plant (VC)	3
43	Oussudu to Porayur road branching from RC Valudavour road near Oussudu tank and ending at RC16 Koodapakkam road (VC)	
44	Ariyur to Anandapuram road branching from NH45A near Sugar Mills (VC)	3.585
45	Road branching from RC26 Koodapakkam road near Pathukannu and ending at RC12 Sanyasikuppam near Konerikuppam (VC)	3
46	Villianur Church Street junction to Thirukanji cremation yard road (new road)	2.053
47	Sembiapalayam to Kizhur road via Sathamangalam (NC)	
48	Ariyur to Sivaranthjagam road (VC)	2.6
49	Pathukannu to Konerikuppam road (VC)	2.015
50	Moolakadai road off NH45A to Perambai bangalow (VC)	1.07
51	Pudukuppam to Lingareddipalayam road (MC)	1.2
52	Road connecting RC4 and Gopalan kadai Kurumbapet road (VC)	0.9
53	Perambai bungalow to Perambai junction road (VC)	0.17
54	Bharathgi Nagar to Ariyapalayam bridge road (VC)	0.975
55	Pillaiyarkuppam to Sellipet causeway (VC)	1.1
56	Pillaiyarkuppamn road off Valudavoaur road (VC)	1.8
57	Thiruvandarkoil to Kothapurinatham road (MC)	1.6
58	Road connecting RC18 to Keezhagaram road via Thirukanji road (VC)	3.35
59	Road from Villianur church to last vanniar street (BC)	0.45
60	Road from Pannithittu regulator (State border) to Vambupet (Pannithittu road) (BC)	1.35
61	Road branching from RC2 (Cuddalore road) to Kirumampakkam Telephone Office (Kirumampakkam road) (BC)	1.35
62	Road branching from Bahour to Kirumampakkam road to bahour to Villianur road at Kuddiyurupalayam (Adingapet road) (BC)	3.2
63	Road from Kuruvinatham koil to Soriankuppam village (Soriankuppam road) (BC)	1
64	Road from Kirumampakkam hospital to Manapet Narambai road (Kirumampakkam road) (BC)	1.3
65	Road branching from RC2 (Cuddalore road) to Manapet-Narambai road (Pudukuppak road) via Madikrishnapuram (BC)	3
66	Road branching from RC2 (Cuddalore road) to Manapet-Narambai road (Manapet road) (BC)	1.1
67	Road from Manapet-Narambai road to Moorthikuppam (Moorthikuppam road) (BC)	0.75
68	Road branching from RC2 (Cuddalore road) to Parikalpet (Mullodai road) n (new road) (BC)	2.1
69	Road from Pillaiyarkuppam to Narambai (Narambai road) (BC)	0.7
70	Road from Manapet culvert to Narambai Nycer company (BC)	2.3
71	Sitheri voikal road (BC)	4
Note:		
	AC - Ariyankuppam Commune	
	BC - Bahour Commune	
	MC - Mannadipet Commune	
	NC - Nettapakkam Commune	
	VC - Villianur Commune	

== See also ==
- Puducherry road network
- Road network in Karaikal District
- Road network in Yanam District
- Road network in Mahe District
