= Kesava Reddy =

Telugu novelist (1946–2015)

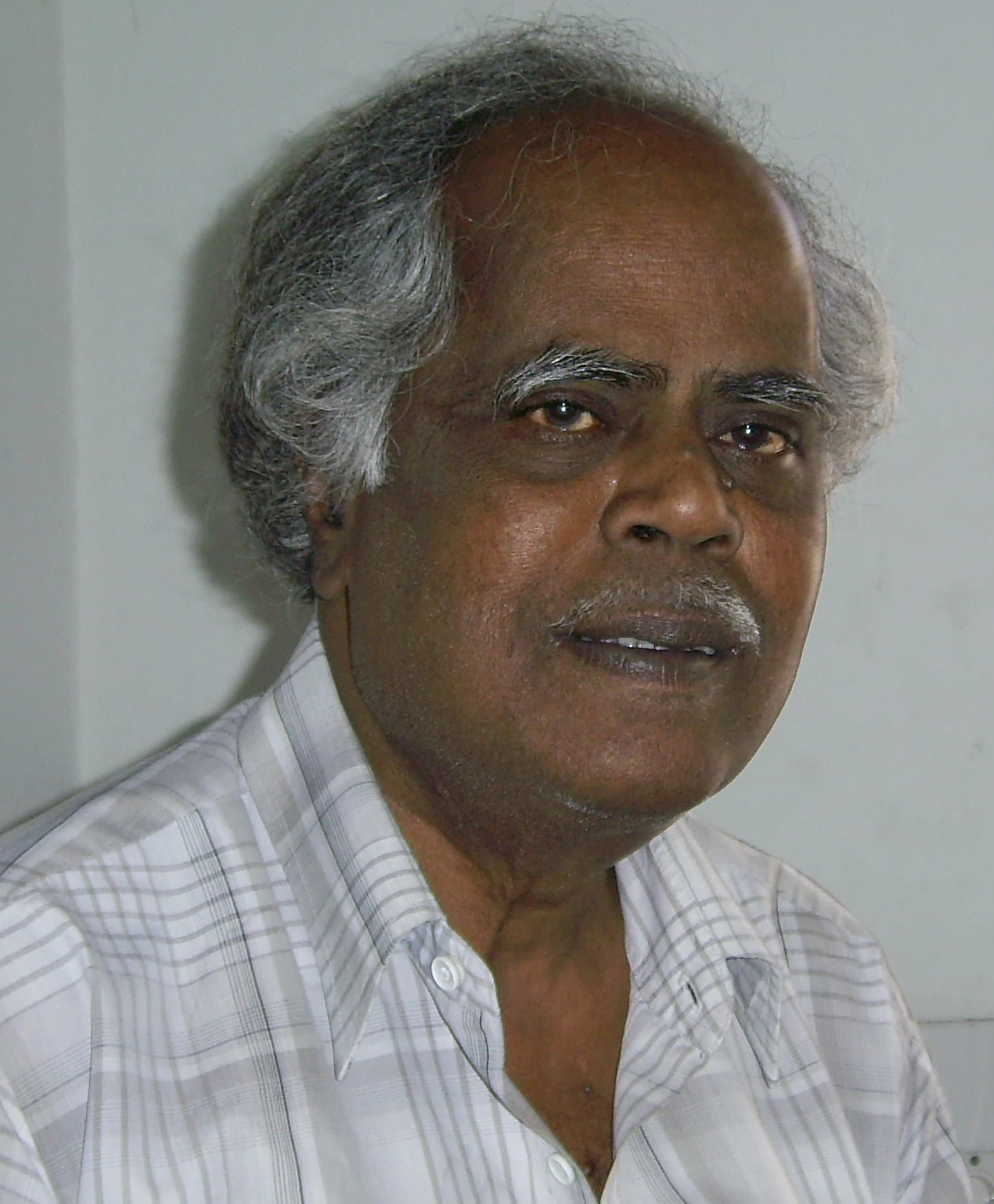
- Born: 10 March 1946; Thalapula Palli, Chittoor, Andhra Pradesh, India
- Died: 13 February 2015 (aged 68); Nizamabad, Telangana, India
- Occupations: Writer and doctor
- Spouse: Dheeramati
- Children: 2
- Writing career
- Period: 1970–2015
- Genre: Non-fiction

Kesava Reddy (10 March 1946 – 13 February 2015) was a Telugu novelist. Hailing from Andhra Pradesh state in India. In his writings he addresses many of the important social problems in India like poverty, prejudices, and superstitions, and encourages people to be socially responsible. He successfully bridges the idealistic and the popular styles of literature. His novel "Athadu Adavini Jayinchadu" was one of his major writings. 'Munemma', 'Moogavani Pillanagrovi' and 'Smasanam Dunne' were among his other novels. Some were translated into English and other languages.

== Life ==
Kesava Reddy was born in Thalapula Palli, Chittoor District, Andhra Pradesh to Ranga Reddy P, a farmer. He did his early education in S.V University, Tirupathi. He obtained his MBBS degree from Pondicherry University, and his pg diploma in dermatology in CMC medical college, Vellore. Reddy worked as a medical officer in Victoria Hospital, Dichpally, Nizamabad. He later retired and settled in Nizamabad town.

=== Interviews ===
- Interview by All India Radio, Nizamabad -

=== Other videos ===
- Review of Novel Athadu Adavini Jayinchaadu
- Antakriyalu
- Kiran Prabha Review

=== Blogs ===
- Hyderabad book trust blog

=== Purchase books ===
- Goodreads
- Amazon Books
- ABE books
- Purchase through WhatsApp: Vishnu Moorthi: +91 9963845649

=== Facebook ===
- Dr Kesava Reddy

=== Novels ===
Year	Title	Language	Synopsis
1975	Banisalu - Bhagavanuvacha - 2 long stories published in one volume	Telugu, English	
1979	Incredible Goddess or Kshudra Devatha	Telugu, English	
1979	Smasaanam dunneru	Telugu	
1980	Athadu Adavini Jayinchadu	Telugu	Athadu Adavini Jayinchadu is a Telugu novel by Kesava Reddy that tells the story of an old swineherd’s search for his pregnant sow in the jungle. He relies on his primal instincts and fights against various predators that threaten his sow and her piglets. The novel depicts the harsh realities of life, the struggle for survival, and the bond between man and animal. The novel spans over two days and covers the themes of courage, compassion, conflict, and futility.
1982	Ramudunaadu- Raajjaymundaadi	Telugu	
1982	City Beautiful	Telugu	The novel is about a medical student named Devidas, who struggles to balance his inner desires and the expectations of society. The novel is set in two days and explores the themes of identity, morality, and freedom. It is considered one of the best works of Kesava Reddy
1996	Chivari gudise	Telugu	
2008	Muneamma	Telugu	
2013	Moogavani Pillanagrovi: Ballad of Ontillu	Telugu, English	'Moogavani Pillanagrovi (1993) is woven around the near-suicidal death of a farmer who loses his land. While the period of the plot is around the 1950s, the story revolves around the farmer's ties with his land and his inability to visualize a life without it-an issue relevant even today. The farmer's death could have been forgotten by the village, except for several puzzling incidents that crop up. Myth and reality intertwine to create a folklore around the land and the farmer.'

== See also ==
- List of Indian writers
- Namdeo Dhasal
- Tapan Kumar Pradhan
