= BINC =

BioInformatics National Certification (BINC) was an initiative of Department of Biotechnology (DBT), Government Of India in coordination with Bioinformatics Center, University of Pune, then from 2011, it was conducted by Jawaharlal Nehru University. However, from 2014 and now it is conducted by Pondicherry University. The objective of the examination is to recognize trained manpower in the area of Bioinformatics. Currently, various Indian universities, Government and private institutions are involved in imparting courses in Bioinformatics in India. However, there exists a large variation in the course contents, training period and method of training. Department of Biotechnology (DBT), Government of India, has instituted BINC examination with an objective to evaluate the Bioinformatics knowledge & skillset of the students. This professional certification would facilitate industries and potential employers in recruiting Bioinformatics professionals. The BINC examination is conducted in the first quarter of every year. Those meeting the prescribed standards in BINC are issued a certificate of proficiency in Bioinformatics. BINC has decided to award Research fellowships to BINC qualified Indian nationals to pursue Ph.D. in Indian Institutes/Universities. Note that the candidate must possess a postgraduate degree & meet the criteria of the institutes/universities in order to avail research fellowship.

== History ==
The BINC examination was introduced in 2006 to identify and certify professionals in the area of Bioinformatics. A national coordination committee under the chairmanship of Prof. P. Gautam consisting of Bioinformatics experts from all over the country, decides the mode, frequency, syllabus, centers of examination, question paper setters, evaluators, etc.

In 2019, DBT announced that the Bioinformatics National Certification would be merged with the DBT Junior Research Fellowship, and that the individual BINC exam would no longer be offered.

== Frequency of the BINC Examination ==
BINC examination was conducted once a year in the first half of the calendar year (usually in the month of March and April).

== Eligibility ==
Graduates in Science, Agriculture, Veterinary, Medicine, Pharmacy, Engineering & Technology were eligible to appear in the examination. They need not have had a bachelor's degree in Life Sciences, Physical Sciences, Chemical Sciences, Mathematical Sciences, Agriculture, Veterinary, Medicine, Pharmacy, Engineering & Technology are eligible to appear in the examination. They need not have had any formal training viz., certificate, diploma or degree in Bioinformatics. Students in final year of Bachelor & Post graduate degree are also eligible to apply.

There was no age limit to appear for the BINC examination. Also, there is no limit on the number of attempts to qualify for BINC certification. However, candidates who have cleared BINC examination in a maximum of three attempts only are eligible for BINC research fellowship, if other criteria set by host research institution are satisfied.

== Qualifying BINC includes ==
- Lifetime certification of candidates knowledge in Bioinformatics by Department of Biotechnology (DBT), Govt. of India.
- Cash prize of Rs. 10,000/- given to top 10 qualifiers.
- Research fellowships awarded to BINC qualified Indian nationals to pursue Ph.D. in Indian Institutes/Universities, subject to the condition that the candidate possesses a postgraduate degree & meet the criteria of the Institutes/Universities.
- This year (2011) DBT has agreed to fund Research fellowships for all the BINC qualified Indian nationals to pursue Ph.D. in Indian Institutes/Universities

== Details of the award ==
Each research fellow who enrolls for the Ph.D. is entitled to a fellowship/stipend of Rs. 25,000/- per month. The fellowship amount is at par with CSIR/UGC JRFs and SRFs. In addition, the fellow is also entitled to HRA (30% in metro city) and other benefits including medical allowance of Rs. 250/- per month. Fellowship would also carry a contingency grant of Rs. 30,000/- per annum. The contingency grant amount is meant for meeting the cost of minor equipment (computer peripherals/ license fees for databases and software) for the research related work of the fellow. A portion of the grant, not exceeding Rs. 10,000/- per annum, may be utilized to attend major conferences/ symposium/seminars/workshops held in India in the area related to research of the fellow.

== BINC Exam is Dead ==
As per reports by Government, BINC Exam was discontinued and merged with DBT BET Exam
