= Ganapathichettikulam =

Village in Kalapet, Puducherry

Coordinates: 12.0456°N 79.861°E

Ganapathichettikulam is a fishing hamlet, along with Periyakalapet, Chinnakalapet and Pillaichavad, next to Kalapet near Pondicherry on the south eastern coast of India. It is a ward in the municipality of Oulgaret.

The main occupations are fishing and agriculture.

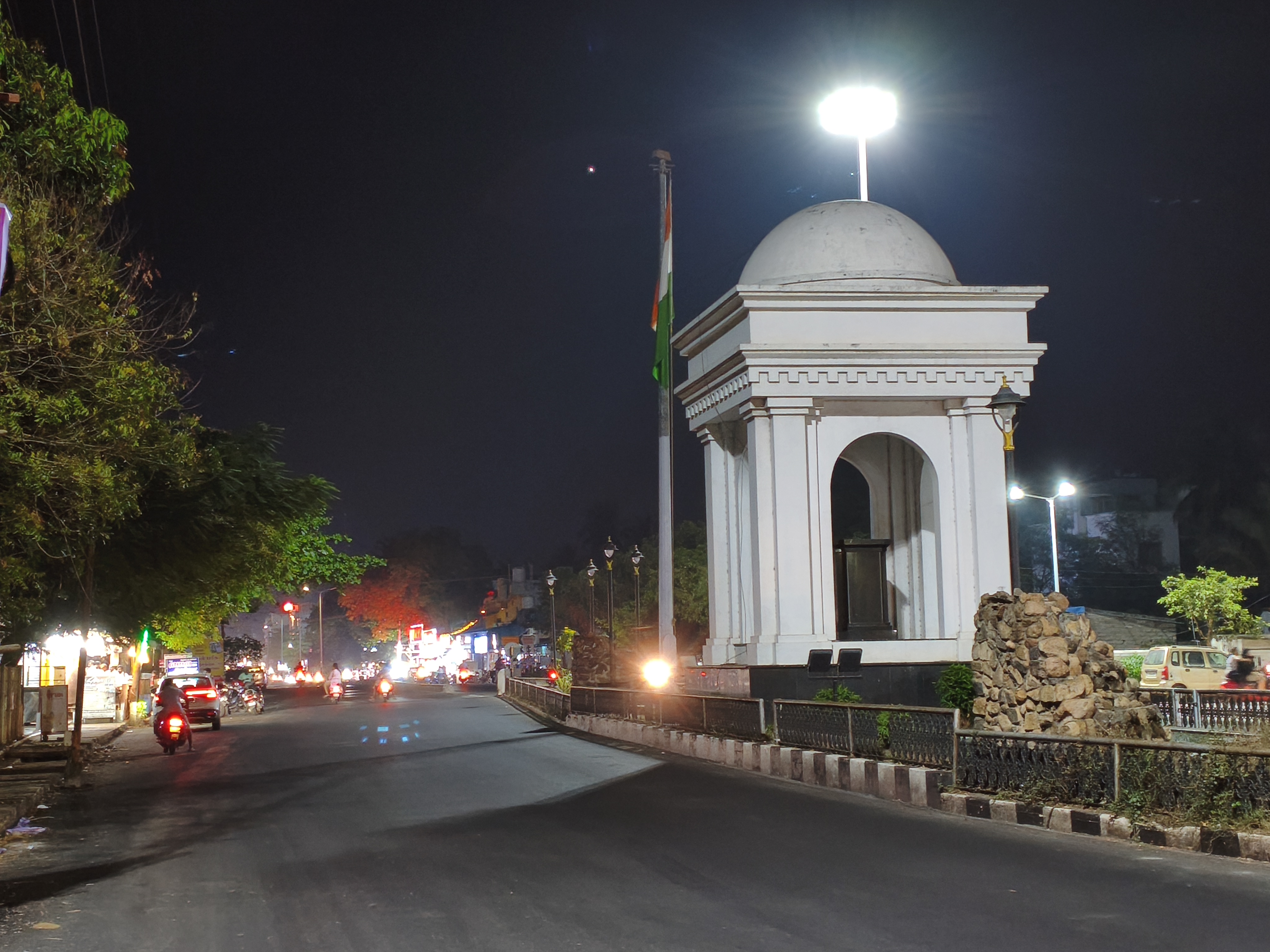
Pondicherry Arch at Ganapathichettikulam

== Buildings ==
The Pondicherry Institute of Medical Sciences is located there, as is Kalapet jail. Ganapathichettikulam has several temples, most notably Lord Ganapathi's temple, Goddess Kangeyamman's temple and Goddess Kamalakanniamman's temple.
