= PTU =

PTU may refer to:

== Science and medicine ==
- Paroxysmal tonic upgaze, ophthalmological disorder
- Phenylthiourea, an organosulfur thiourea
- Power transfer unit, for aircraft hydraulic systems
- Propylthiouracil, a hyperthyroidism drug

== Universities ==
- Puducherry Technological University, Pondicherry, India
- Punjab Technical University, Jalandhar, India
- Pyay Technological University, Burma

== Organizations ==
- Australian Rail Tram and Bus Industry Union or Public Transport Union
- Hong Kong Professional Teachers' Union
- Paratroop Training Unit RAAF, during World War II
- Plumbing Trades Union, UK

== Other uses ==
- PTU (film), Hong Kong, 2003
- Platinum Airport, Alaska, US, IATA code
- Police Tactical Units (PTUs)
- Professional technical school (Russian: Professionalno-tehnicheskoye uchilische) in the Soviet Union
- Podatek od towarów i usług, value-added tax in Poland

== See also ==
- Police tactical unit (disambiguation)
