= Badhe =

Badhe is a surname. Notable people with the surname include:

- Raja Badhe (1912–1977), Indian Marathi poet
- Sushrut Badhe (born 1990), Indian author and manufacturer
