= Puducherry road network =

Puducherry (French: Réseau routier de Pondichéry) has a network of all-weather metalled roads connecting every village in the territory. The territory has a total road length of 2552 km (road length per 4.87 km^{2}).

== Road length comparison ==
Roads
Total road length (in Puducherry)			2552 km.
Road length per 1000 km^{2}	Puducherry	Tamil Nadu	India
Road length per 1000 km^{2}	4575	1572	663

== Classification of roads ==
Sl. No.	Type of road	Length in (km)
1	National highways	64.450
2	State highways	49.304
3	District & other roads	
	Pondicherry - 173.384	
	Karaikal - 55.162	
	Mahe - 19.622	
	Yanam - 26.460	
	274.628	274.628
4	Rural roads	
	Pondicherry - 164.964	
	Karaikal - 83.470	
	248.434	248.434
	Grand total	636.816

== See also ==
- Road Network in Pondicherry District
- Road Network in Karaikal District
- Road Network in Yanam District
- Road Network in Mahe District
