= Pondicherry Institute of Medical Sciences =

Tertiary care teaching hospital

Coordinates: 12.0479°N 79.8556°E

- Motto: To reach the unreached
- Type: Public
- Established: 2002
- Academic affiliations: Pondicherry University
- Director-Principal: Dr. Renu G'Boy Varghese
- Location: Pondicherry, Puducherry, India
- Website: www.pimsmmm.com

Pondicherry Institute of Medical Sciences (PIMS) is a tertiary care hospital and teaching institute at Kalapet in the Union Territory of Puducherry, India. The college has been approved for full recognition by MCI for 150 seats for MBBS degree granted by the Pondicherry University. The PIMS is a unit of The Madras Medical Mission, a charitable society and hospital in Chennai promoted by the members of the Malankara Orthodox Christian community.

== College administration ==
The Office-bearers of The Madras Medical Mission are:

- H. G. Dr. Yuhanon Mar Diascoros, Bishop of Madras - Hon. President
- Reji Abraham - Hon. Vice-President
- M. M. Philip - Hon. Secretary and Chairman (PIMS)
- E. John Thomas - Hon. Treasurer

The Hospital/Medical School is currently administered by Director-Principal Dr. Renu G'Boy Varghese. Administrative Officers include:

- Dean UG (Undergraduate Studies): Dr. Johnny Asir
- Dean PG (Postgraduate Studies): Dr. Sheela Devi Bazroy
- Dean Research: Dr. Reba Kanungo
- Dean MEU: Dr. Subhasis Das
- Registrar: Dr. Anil J. Purty

== Academics and courses ==
PIMS has a Medical College, Multi-Specialty Hospital and a Nursing College.

PIMS Pondicherry offers more than 20 courses in medical stream including MBBS, MD, MS and M Ch in plastic surgery. All these courses include undergraduate, post graduate and doctoral courses. It also has post graduate diplomas in many fields.

=== College of Nursing, PIMS ===
College of Nursing (French: Collège des sciences infirmières), Pondicherry Institute of Medical Sciences was established in 2004 and is affiliated to Pondicherry University. It offers BSc and Msc in nursing.
