= T. Vikraman =

Indian politician

Member of Puducherry Legislative Assembly
- In office 2021–2021
- Preceded by: K. G. Shankar
- Succeeded by: R. B. Ashok Babu
- Constituency: Nominated

Personal details
- Born: T. Vikraman
- Party: Bharatiya Janata Party

T. Vikraman is an Indian politician and member of the Bharatiya Janata Party. He is Nominated as a Member of Legislative Assembly (MLA) to the Puducherry Legislative Assembly from January 29, 2021 by the Government of India. He has nominated to the Legislative Assembly after the death of K. G. Shankar.
