= J. A. K. Tareen =

Indian geologist and university vice-chancellor

Jalees Ahmed Khan Tareen
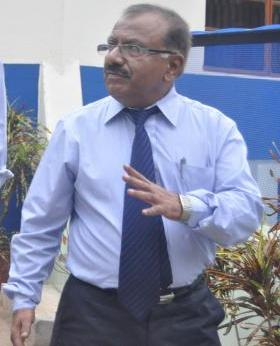
- Born: 1947 (age 78–79); Mysore, Karnataka, India
- Awards: Padma Shri (2009)
- Scientific career
- Fields: Geologist, Experimental Mineralogy and Solid State Chemistry
- Workplaces: B. S. Abdur Rahman University, Pondicherry University, University of Mysore, University of Kashmir

Jalees Ahmed Khan Tareen, also known as J.A.K. Tareen, was born in Mysore, Karnataka, India in 1947. He was the vice-chancellor of B. S. Abdur Rahman University, in Chennai, India from 2013 to 31 March 2015. He was the recipient of the Padma Shri award 2009 for the Literature & Education given by the Government of India. He is one of the current advisory board member of South Asia Foundation (SAF) from India.

== Education ==
Tareen has received his master of science (Geology, 1967), and PhD (Experimental Mineralogy, 1977) from Mysore University, India and second PhD from Bordeaux University, France (Solid State Chemistry, 1987). He was also a visiting scientist at Tokyo Institute of Technology, Japan, Bordeaux University, France, University of Edinburgh, Scotland and Mekele University-Ethiopia.

== Professional career ==
Tareen has served the university of Mysore for 33 years (1967–2000) at department of geology as a lecturer, professor, professor and head, and finally as a director of mineralogical institute. He has published notable research papers and two fundamental crystallography books, namely "A Basic Course in Crystallography" and "Fundamentals of Crystal Chemistry".

In 2001 he has become the vice-chancellor of Kashmir University (2001–2004). Kashmir, India.

Later, he served as CEO of South Asia Foundation and active member of university grants commission (UGC), India. He was involved in preparing the XII plan document on higher education on issues of Quality and increasing Access.

He then served as the vice-chancellor of Pondicherry University (2007-2013),

He served as the vice-chancellor of B. S. Abdur Rahman University, in Chennai, India, from 2013 to 2015.

== Awards and honors ==
Tareen is a recipient of several state as well as national awards. Taking into account of his contribution as a scientist and educationalist, Indian government has awarded the Padma Shri to him in 2009. He has also received the National Mineral award, the golden Jubilee Science & Technology award of Mysore University, and Mineralogical Society Gold Medal award.

== Other activities ==
Tareen has published his memoirs of Kashmir as a book, Fire under the Snowflakes - The return of Kashmir University. His ideas on education is revealed by his talks and interviews which includes ‘higher education’, ‘education for all’, ‘making Indian universities globally competitive’, etc.
