= Bigg Boss (Malayalam TV series) season 3 =

Third Season of television series

Bigg Boss
- Season 3
- Presented by: Mohanlal
- No. of days: 95
- No. of contestants: 18
- Winner: Manikuttan
- Runner-up: Sai Vishnu
- No. of episodes: 96

Release
- Original network: Asianet
- Original release: 14 February – 20 May 2021

Season chronology
- ← Previous; Season 2 Next → Season 4

The third season of the Indian Malayalam-language reality television game show Bigg Boss premiered on 14 February 2021. It is produced by Endemol Shine India under the control of Banijay and broadcast on Asianet with Mohanlal as the host. The show follows selected contestants who are isolated from the outside world for 112 days (or 16 weeks) in a custom-built house.

The show got suspended on Day 95 after Tamil Nadu Police sealed the set due to violating lockdown rules. The contestants of the show were shifted to a hotel. Meanwhile, the makers released a statement that the season three is temporarily suspended due to the rising COVID-19 cases and lockdown in Tamil Nadu and the show will be restarted once the crisis is over.

However, the show makers later declared that the season would have a winner, unlike the last season and the channel started online voting featuring all 8 finalists. The one who receives the maximum number of votes was declared the winner. The contestants of the show came back to Kerala, as it was confirmed that the show cannot be resumed. On 25 July 2021, the show makers announced that the special grand finale episode, featuring host Mohanlal and the finalists was telecasted on 1 August 2021. Manikuttan was declared the winner of the house after facing the public vote.

== Production ==
The official announcement for Season 3 was revealed on 3 January 2021 by Tovino Thomas at the launch event for Star Singer Season 8. On 1 February 2021, the channel announced that the season will launch on 14 February 2021 with Mohanlal returning as host. The opening of the third season of Bigg Boss premiered on Valentine's Day 14 February 2021. Monday through Friday episodes will air at 9:30 pm. The audition for the show began in August 2020, after seven months of auditioning, 14 contestants working in different fields were shortlisted to enter the house. They were subjected to two weeks of quarantine precaution for the COVID-19 pandemic and tested negative.

=== House ===
The luxurious set of the house from the second season continued for the third season. The whole of the house is built with a Malayali touch. The traditions and culture of Kerala can be seen in the design of the house.

=== Eye ===
As usual, Bigg Boss comes with a new logo of an eye for season 3. The red colour background of the Eye is designed in a modern machinery touch by motion graphic artist Deepu Chandran (Asianet). The tag line as said in the promos of the show is "The Show Must Go On", a different one as compared to the previous two seasons.

=== Opening ===
The season premiered on 14 February 2021 on Valentine's Day. Host Mohanlal started the show inside Bigg Boss's house, where the contestants joined him. The host walked through the house but and had covered the entire area. This time, the launch episode had broadcast an AV about the housemates after their arrival and the stage performance was split into the AV. The housemates received a flower for being the Valentine for the day and a jar of chocolates when entering the house. Housemates, for the first time, had colored microphone bags with their names on them.

== Housemates status ==
This year they have decided to put 8 Finalists (Final 8) due to the COVID.

Sr	Housemate	Day entered	Day exited	Status
1	Manikuttan	Day 0	Day 71	Walked
1	Manikuttan	Day 74	Day 95	Sent Home
1	Manikuttan	Day 105	Day 105	Winner
2	Sai	Day 0	Day 95	Sent Home
2	Sai	Day 105	Day 105	1st Runner-up
3	Dimpal	Day 0	Day 74	Walked
3	Dimpal	Day 88	Day 95	Sent Home
3	Dimpal	Day 105	Day 105	2nd Runner-up
4	Ramzan	Day 0	Day 95	Sent Home
4	Ramzan	Day 105	Day 105	3rd Runner-up
5	Anoop	Day 0	Day 95	Sent Home
5	Anoop	Day 105	Day 105	4th Runner-up
6	Firoz A	Day 0	Day 95	Sent Home
6	Firoz A	Day 105	Day 105	5th Runner-up
7	Rithu	Day 0	Day 95	Sent Home
7	Rithu	Day 105	Day 105	6th Runner-up
8	Noby	Day 0	Day 95	Sent Home
8	Noby	Day 105	Day 105	7th Runner-up
9	Soorya	Day 0	Day 91	Evicted
10	Remya	Day 13	Day 35	Evicted
10	Remya	Day 49	Day 90	Evicted
11	Adoney	Day 0	Day 77	Evicted
12	Sandhya	Day 0	Day 70	Evicted
13	Firoz K & Sajna	Day 8	Day 58	Ejected
14	Bhagyalakshmi	Day 0	Day 49	Evicted
15	Majiziya	Day 0	Day 42	Evicted
16	Angel	Day 13	Day 28	Evicted
17	Michelle	Day 8	Day 21	Evicted
18	Lekshmi	Day 0	Day 14	Evicted

== Housemates ==
The participants in the order of appearance and entrance in the house are:

=== Original entrants ===
- Adoney T John, research scholar, public speaker
- Anoop Krishnan, TV actor and television presenter who is known for his stint in Asianet serial Seethakalyanam
- Bhagyalakshmi, Senior Dubbing Artist who is known for dubbing more than 4000 Malayalam Films. She is a writer and social activist.
- Dimpal Bhal psychologist and Fashion stylist .
- Firoz Khan Abdul Azeez, radio personality, Television presenter
- Lekshmi Jayan, singer and violinist. She was a former contestant in Asianet Idea Star Singer.
- Majiziya Bhanu, Indian Bodybuilder and arm wrestler from Kerala who is known for her national and international achievements in Arm wrestling.
- Manikuttan, Film Actor, who prominently works in the Malayalam film industry
- Noby Marcose, Film, TV Actor, Comedian who appeared in Asianet Comedy Stars and Star Magic in Flowers Channel.
- Ramzan Muhammed, Dancer, actor, and the winner of the dance reality show D 4 Dance.
- Rithu Manthra, model, actor, and singer. She has represented Kerala in Femina Miss India 2018.
- Sai Vishnu, model
- Sandhya Manoj, Dancer, dancing teacher, and Yoga instructor.
- Soorya J Menon, model, Actor and DJ .

=== Wildcard entrants ===
- Angel Thomas, Model and fashion designer
- Firoz Khan, an Actor, host of a prank show called Dangerous Boys and a reality show alumina who had participated in several shows such as Jodi No:1 and Thillana Thillana.
- Michelle Ann Daniel, Film actress is known for her role as Michelle in the Malayalam Films, Oru Adaar Love, Dhamaka.
- Remya Panickar, Film actress. She is well known for her role as 'Jolly Miss' in the movie, Chunkzz.
- Sajna Firoz, Television actress. She is remembered for her notable roles in television serials such as Anna Kareena, and Chackoyum Maryyum.

== Prison ==
Each week, two housemates who did not perform well in the Luxury Budget Task, are sent to the Bigg Boss Prison. The cell does not include the luxury facilities which are in the house. It contains a metal cot and another bed on the floor.

Week	In Prison	
1	None	
2	Firoz A	Sai
3	Michelle	Soorya
4	None	
5	Firoz K & Sajna	Soorya
6	Noby	Ramzan
7	Adoney	Anoop
8	Rithu	Sai
9	None	
10	Adoney	Ramzan
11	Rithu	Soorya
12	Sai	Manikuttan
13	Remya	Sai
14	None	
15	None	

== Weekly summary ==
Week 1	Entrances	Day 0: Noby Marcose, Dimpal Bhal, Firoz Azeez, Manikuttan, Majiziya Bhanu, Soorya Menon, Lekshmi Jayan, Sai Vishnu, Anoop Krishnan, Adoney T John, Ramzan Muhammed, Rithu Manthra, Sandhya Manoj, and Bhagyalakshmi entered the Bigg Boss House.
Week 1	House Captain	Days 2–7: Bhagyalakshmi was the House Captain of Week 1.
Week 1	Nominations	None
Week 1	Luxury Budget Task	Days 2–6: Share the Memories: Each housemate has to hit the buzzer and talk about a topic they get to share their past life, family, friends, sorrows, strengths, and how they achieved their dreams, with the other housemates. Day 2: Noby, Soorya; Day 3: Dimpal, Majiziya, Rithu, Anoop; Day 4: Lekshmi, Sai, Manikuttan; Day 5: Firoz A, Bhagyalakshmi, Sandhya; Day 6: Adoney, Ramzan
Week 1	Jail	None
Week 1	Captaincy Task	Day 2: The participants Bhagyalakshmi and Lekshmi qualified for the captaincy task after winning the game Kittiyal Kitti Poyal Poyi. Later Bigg Boss announced the vote for the better among them, Lekshmi received fewer than Bhagyalakshmi, and she became the House Captain of Week 1. Day 7: Bigg Boss gave the captaincy task to wildcards Contestants to choose the New Captain from among all Housemates, and they chose Soorya Menon, and she became the House Captain of Week 2.
Week 1	Safe	None
Week 1	Exits	None
Week 2	Entrances	Day 7: Firoz Khan & Sajna Firoz (single contestant), Michelle Ann Daniel entered the Bigg Boss House as Wildcard Contestants.
Week 2	House Captain	Days 7–12: Soorya was the House Captain of Week 2.
Week 2	Nominations	Day 8: Adoney, Bhagyalakshmi, Dimpal, Firoz A, Lekshmi, Rithu, Sai, Sandhya were nominated for the 2nd Week eviction process.
Week 2	Luxury Budget Task	Days 9–11: Devasuram Task: One person from Heaven will have to face members from Hell. Members from Hell should torture the person from Heaven either by laughing or by the movement of their body. When the First Conch sound is heard, one person should be selected from Heaven and face the members from Hell. The selected person from Heaven should not move or laugh until the Last Conch sound is heard. If they win, they will return to Heaven, or else, they will be enslaved in Hell. Team A: Bhagyalakshmi, Firoz K, Majiziya, Manikuttan, Noby, Ramzan, Sajna, Sandhya, Soorya; Team B: Anoop, Adoney, Dimpal, Firoz A, Lekshmi, Michelle, Rithu, Sai; Lekshmi, Manikuttan and Noby were selected as the best performers of the task and were selected for the Week 3 Captaincy Task.
Week 2	Jail	Day 12: Firoz A and Sai were sent to Jail, due to the lack of involvement in most of the activities conducted.
Week 2	Captaincy Task	Day 12: The participants Lekshmi, Manikuttan, and Noby are asked to wears the exact first dress, as in the sample image. The clothing may have been mixed in four baskets in the Garden area. Manikuttan got more clothes were worn right than Lekshmi and Noby, and he became the House Captain of Week 3.
Week 2	Safe	Day 14: Sai, Sandhya, Adoney, Rithu, Firoz A, Dimpal, Bhagyalakshmi received enough public votes to stay in the competition and they were safe.
Week 2	Exits	Day 14: Lekshmi Jayan was evicted from the house after facing the public vote.
Week 3	Entrances	Day 13: Angel Thomas and Remya Panickar entered the Bigg Boss House as Wildcard Contestants.
Week 3	House Captain	Days 12–21: Manikuttan was the House Captain of Week 3.
Week 3	Nominations	Day 15: Anoop, Bhagyalakshmi, Dimpal, Firoz K & Sajna, Michelle, Sai, Soorya were nominated for the 3rd Week eviction process.
Week 3	Luxury Budget Task	Days 16–17: Ponnu Vilayum Mannu: Police Officers, who will have to allow the laborers to enter their zone to collect clay which has gold coins inside it. The police officers can also make deals with the laborers to collect their respective coins. During that luxury budget task, Firoz K complained that Sai hit Sajna, injuring her back. She immediately complained to Bigg Boss and demanded justice. Later Bigg Boss announced that the Luxury Budget Task is being canceled because of the undignified acts of the housemates. Police Officers: Dimpal, Ramzan, Sajna; Laborers: Adoney, Anoop, Angel, Bhagyalakshmi, Firoz A, Firoz K, Majiziya, Manikuttan, Michelle, Noby, Remya, Rithu, Sai, Sandhya, Soorya; Adoney, Firoz A and Noby were selected as the best performers of the task and were selected for the Week 4 Captaincy Task.
Week 3	Jail	Day 19: Michelle and Soorya were sent to Jail, due to the lack of involvement in most of the activities conducted.
Week 3	Captaincy Task	Day 21: The participants Adoney, Firoz and Noby were asked to participate in a demo car color race as the captaincy task. The Participants need to add the color on the car wheels and race track with colored demo car. Noby substitute Ramzan to play for him. Later Ramzan had won the task fastest and Noby Marcose was declared as the House Captain of Week 4.
Week 3	Safe	Day 21: Sai, Anoop, Dimpal, Sajna, Firoz K, Soorya, Bhagyalakshmi received enough public votes to stay in the competition and they were safe.
Week 3	Exits	Day 21: Michelle Ann Daniel was evicted from the house after facing the public vote.
Week 4	Entrances	None
Week 4	House Captain	Days 21–28: Noby Marcose was the House Captain of Week 4.
Week 4	Nominations	Day 22: Angel, Firoz K & Sajna, Manikuttan, Rithu, Soorya were nominated for the 4th Week eviction process.
Week 4	Luxury Budget Task	Days 23–25: Bigg Boss University: Bigg boss house turned into Bigg Boss University, with contestants playing roles of college professor and students from the class of 1983. College Staffs: Remya (principal), Bhagyalakshmi (office assistant), Angel, Firoz K, Majiziya, Ramzan, Rithu, Soorya (professors); Students in University: Adoney, Anoop, Dimpal, Firoz A, Noby, Manikuttan, Sai, Sajna, Sandhya; Later, after the death of the owner of the university, his granddaughter, Bhagyalakshmi is appointed as the new head of the university. Anoop, Firoz A, Firoz K & Sajna, Manikuttan and Ramzan were selected as the best performers of the task and were selected for the Week 5 Captaincy Task.
Week 4	Jail	None
Week 4	Captaincy Task	Day 26: The participants Anoop, Firoz A, Firoz K & Sajna, Manikuttan and Ramzan were asked to discuss on any issue of their choice and then decide upon themselves whom should go out of the task after each buzzer. At last, Ramzan Muhammad became the House Captain of Week 5 and he also received the Eviction Free Pass.
Week 4	Safe	Days 27–28: Rithu, Soorya, Firoz K & Sajna, Manikuttan received enough public votes to stay in the competition and they were safe.
Week 4	Exits	Day 28: Angel Thomas was evicted from the house after facing a public vote.
Week 5	Entrances	None
Week 5	House Captain	Days 28–35: Ramzan Muhammad was the House Captain of Week 5.
Week 5	Nominations	Day 29: Dimpal, Firoz A, Firoz K & Sajna, Majiziya, Remya, Rithu, Sai were nominated for the 5th Week eviction process.
Week 5	Luxury Budget Task	Days 30–32: Kaliyattam: The housemates have dance on a stage platform located in the living room of the Bigg Boss House. The housemates will be asked to dance for a certain songs for the character has given. Day 30: Firoz K & Sajna (kasthoori ente kasthoori), Firoz A (pandi melam pattu koothu), Manikuttan (chingamasam vannu chernnal), Sandhya (ente manasil oru naanam), Rithu (minnaminunge minnum minunge); Day 31: Anoop (velmuruka haro hara), Noby (kakothi Kavil), Rithu (puthu mazhayayi vannoo née), Sai (udicha chandirante), Bhagyalakshmi (tapp tapp), Dimpal (ootty pattanam), Majiziya (kizhakku pookkum), Adoney (kara kana kadalala mele); Day 32: Manikuttan (vaaleduthal angakali), Firoz K & Sajna (ezhimala poonchola), Remya (kaithapoovin kannikurumbil), Ramzan (sa re ga ma); Firoz A, Manikuttan and Rithu were selected as the best performers of the task and were selected for the Week 6 Captaincy Task.
Week 5	Jail	Day 33: Firoz K & Sajna, and Soorya were sent to Jail, due to the lack of involvement in most of the activities conducted.
Week 5	Captaincy Task	Day 33: The participants Firoz A, Manikuttan and Rithu were tied with rope. They were supported by Adoney for Rithu, Anoop for Firoz, and Majiziya for Manikuttan respectively. And the participants were to untie themselves by running around a pillar, to which the rope is attached. Firoz Azeez completed the task fastest and correctly than Manikuttan and Rithu, and he became the House Captain of Week 6.
Week 5	Safe	Days 34–35: Dimpal, Firoz A, Rithu, Sai, Firoz K & Sajna, Majiziya received enough public votes to stay in the competition and they were safe.
Week 5	Exits	'Day 35Remya S panicker was evicted from the house after facing a public vote.
Week 6	Entrances	None
Week 6	House Captain	Days 35–42: Firoz Azeez was the House Captain of Week 6.
Week 6	Nominations	Day 36: Anoop, Dimpal, Firoz K & Sajna, Majiziya, Sai, Soorya were nominated for the 6th Week eviction process.
Week 6	Luxury Budget Task	Days 37–39: Kuzhalpanthu Kalli: All the housemates need to play their own to catch a ball which comes down through a pipeline. Whenever their name is shown on TV, they need to go and get the ball. If they catch they will get 10 points and if they miss it, they will not receive any points. All the housemates will be divided into 2 teams, each member from a team will need to catch a ball which comes down through a pipeline. The team member who catches the bowl will get big ball 20 points, medium ball 10 points and small ball 5 points for their team. When each housemate catches a golden ball, they get to pick a special advantage which will be displayed on the board. Team A: Adoney, Manikuttan, Noby, Ramzan, Rithu, Sai, Soorya; Team B: Anoop, Bhagyalakshmi, Dimpal, Firoz A, Firoz K & Sajna, Majiziya, Sandhya; Points: Majiziya: 68, Firoz K & Sajna: 62, Anoop: 59, Rithu: 48, Sandhya: 29, Adoney: 28, Manikuttan: 28, Sai: 28, Soorya: 28, Bhagyalakshmi: 19, Firoz A: 19, Ramzan: 13, Noby: 12, Dimpal: 9 Dimpal, Firoz K & Sajna and Sai were selected as the best performers of the task and were selected for the Week 7 Captaincy Task.
Week 6	Jail	Day 40: Noby and Ramzan were sent to Jail, due to lack of involvement in most of the activities conducted.
Week 6	Captaincy Task	Day 42: The participants Dimpal, Firoz K & Sajna, and Sai were asked to make the flags, their both legs were tied with rope and place the flag in the thermocol. Later Sai Vishnu made and place more flags than Dimpal and Firoz K & Sajna, and he became the House Captain of Week 7.
Week 6	Safe	Day 42: Soorya, Anoop, Sai, Firoz K & Sajna, Dimpal received enough public votes to stay in the competition and they were safe.
Week 6	Exits	Day 42: Majiziya Bhanu was evicted from the house after facing a public vote.
Week 7	Entrances	None
Week 7	House Captain	Days 42–49: Sai Vishnu was the House Captain of Week 7.
Week 7	Nominations	Day 43: Anoop, Bhagyalakshmi, Firoz A, Firoz K & Sajna, Noby, Ramzan, Sandhya, Soorya were nominated for the 7th Week eviction process.
Week 7	Luxury Budget Task	Days 44–45: Alakku Company: When the siren (Punjabi House movie dialogue) plays, all Laborers should collect all dirty clothes, washing powder, and buttons from the slide and both teams need to wash, dry and iron those dirty clothes. The quality inspector of each team should check the washed clothes of opposite team and decide whether to accept or reject them. Team A: Sandhya (quality inspector), Adoney, Anoop, Bhagyalakshmi, Dimpal, Firoz A, Soorya (laborers); Team B: Noby (quality inspector), Firoz K & Sajna, Manikuttan, Ramzan, Rithu, Sai (laborers); Team A: 5 selected and 25 rejected Team B: 6 selected and 23 rejected Firoz K & Sajna, Manikuttan and Ramzan were selected as the best performers of the task and were selected for the Week 8 Captaincy Task.
Week 7	Jail	Day 47: Adoney and Anoop were sent to Jail, due to lack of involvement in most of the activities conducted.
Week 7	Captaincy Task	Days 47–48: The participants Firoz K & Sajna, Manikuttan and Ramzan will be connected in a rope with three hooks attached to each captaincy contenders. Later Manikuttan who stays with the rope without detaching the hook, and he became the House Captain of Week 8.
Week 7	Safe	Day 48: Sandhya, Soorya, Firoz K & Sajna, Firoz A, Anoop, Ramzan, Noby received enough votes to stay in the competition and they were safe.
Week 7	Exits	Day 48: Bhagyalakshmi was evicted from the house after facing a public vote.
Week 8	Entrances	Day 49: Ex-Contestant Remya Panicker re-entered the Bigg Boss House as Wildcard Contestant.
Week 8	House Captain	Days 49–56: Manikuttan was the House Captain of Week 8.
Week 8	Nominations	Day 50: Adoney, Firoz K & Sajna, Rithu, Sai, Sandhya were nominated for the 8th Week eviction process.
Week 8	Luxury Budget Task	Days 51–54: Vilkkanund Swapnangal: Each housemate has to hit the buzzer and needs to impress other housemates their talents. And gain the maximum number of points from others. Day 51: Manikuttan, Adoney; Day 52: Ramzan, Dimpal, Firoz K & Sajna; Day 53: Firoz A, Remya, Rithu; Day 54: Sandhya, Noby, Soorya, Anoop, Sai; Points: Ramzan: 265, Firoz: 255, Dimpal: 245, Adoney: 230, Noby: 215, Firoz & Sajna: 215, Sandhya: 205, Remya: 200, Soorya: 175, Manikuttan: 170, Anoop: 160, Rithu: 130, Sai: 125; Dimpal, Firoz A, and Ramzan had the most points from the task and were selected for the Week 9 Captaincy Task.
Week 8	Jail	Day 55: Rithu and Sai were sent to Jail, due to lack of involvement in most of the activities conducted.
Week 8	Captaincy Task	Day 56: The participants Dimpal, Firoz A and Ramzan were blindfolded, and to hit the football with each letter of the word captain in penalty shootout. Ramzan Muhammad scored more goals than Dimpal and Firoz A, and he became the House Captain of Week 9.
Week 8	Safe	None
Week 8	Exit:	None
Week 9	Entrances	None
Week 9	House Captain	Day 56–63: Ramzan Muhammad was the House Captain of Week 9.
Week 9	Nominations	Day 50: Adoney, Firoz K & Sajna, Rithu, Sai, Sandhya were nominated for the 9th Week eviction process.
Week 9	Luxury Budget Task	None
Week 9	Jail	None
Week 9	Captaincy Task	Day 61: Adoney, Anoop, and Sandhya qualified for the captaincy task after selected for the best performer of the week. Day 63: The participants Adoney, Anoop and Sandhya were asked to paint on a large canvas. Adoney choose green, Anoop choose yellow and Sandhya choose red. Adoney john use more space on canvas to paint than Anoop and Sandhya, and he became the House Captain of Week 10.
Week 9	Safe	None
Week 9	Exits	Day 58: Firoz Khan & Sajna Firoz were ejected from the Bigg Boss House for violating the rules.
Week 10	Entrances	None
Week 10	House Captain	Day 63–70: Adoney T John was the House Captain of Week 10.
Week 10	Nominations	Day 64: Anoop, Dimpal, Rithu, Sai, Sandhya, Soorya were nominated for the 10th Week eviction process.
Week 10	Luxury Budget Task	Day 65–67: Naattukoottam: The housemates were divided into two teams. One person from the team A will have to face team B members and they ask many random questions to them. The person from team A should answer all questions. When the First Conch sound is heard, team B should announce the selected person to answer questions and stand in the top of the boarder. Team A: Firoz A, Noby, Ramzan, Remya, Rithu, Sandhya; Team B: Adoney, Anoop, Dimpal, Manikuttan, Sai, Soorya; Dimpal, Remya and Sandhya were selected as the best performers of the task and were selected for the Week 11 Captaincy Task.
Week 10	Jail	Day 68: Adoney and Ramzan were sent to Jail, due to the lack of involvement in most of the activities conducted.
Week 10	Captaincy Task	Day 68: The participants Dimpal, Remya and Sandhya were asked to put makeup on their own face without mirror. They were supported by Soorya for Sandhya, Rithu for Remya and Ramzan for Dimpal respectively. Later Remya Panickar looks more attractive makeup look than Dimpal and Sandhya, and she became the House Captain of Week 11.
Week 10	Safe	Day 70: Anoop, Rithu, Sai, Dimpal, Soorya received enough votes to stay in the competition and they were safe.
Week 10	Exits	Day 70: Sandhya Manoj was evicted from the house after facing the public vote.
Week 11	Entrances	Day 74: Manikuttan re-entered the Bigg Boss House.
Week 11	House Captain	Day 70–77: Remya Panickar was the House Captain of Week 11.
Week 11	Nominations	Day 71: Adoney, Anoop, Firoz A, Ramzan, Sai, Soorya were nominated for the 11th Week eviction process.
Week 11	Luxury Budget Task	Day 72–73: Nanayapperuma: When the sound of jingling coins is played, there will be a shower of coins in the garden area. Contestants have to collect them and save them carefully. Each contestant has to try to save their coins and also have to have the most coins. After the first task completed, the contestants announced their scores Anoop, Adoney, Ramzan, and Soorya were one of the highest scorers. The contestants divide into five teams and they should try to attach the danger coin on a contestant's jacket and the contestant who had the coin attached by the end buzzer will lose half of the points acquired so far. After the second task completed Rithu and Soorya lose half of the points Team 1: Anoop, Dimpal; Team 2: Ramzan, Adoney; Team 3: Remya, Sai; Team 4: Firoz A, Noby; Team 5: Soorya, Rithu; Points: Anoop: 370, Adoney: 360, Ramzan: 360, Firoz A: 190, Dimpal: 170, Soorya: 140, Noby: 80, Sai: 80, Remya: 50, Rithu: 30; Adoney, Anoop and Ramzan were selected as the best performers of the task and were selected for the Week 12 Captaincy Task.
Week 11	Jail	Day 74: Rithu and Soorya were sent to Jail, due to the lack of involvement in most of the activities conducted.
Week 11	Captaincy Task	Day 75: The participants Adoney, Anoop and Ramzan were given a pull cart and they were asked to compete in a race by carrying their supporters on the same. They were supported by Firoz A and Remya for Adoney; Manikuttan, Sai, and Soorya for Anoop; and Noby and Rithu for Ramzan respectively. Later Adoney T John took less time to carry his supporters than Anoop and Ramzan, and he became the captain of Week 12.
Week 11	Safe	Day 77: Anoop, Ramzan, Firoz A, Sai, Soorya received enough votes to stay in the competition and they were safe.
Week 11	Exits	Day 71: Manikuttan quits the show after feeling mental breakdown. Day 74: Dimpal Bhal quit the show due to her father's death. Day 77: Adoney T John was evicted from the house after facing the public vote.
Week 12	Entrances	None
Week 12	House Captain	Day 77–84: Anoop Krishnan was the House Captain of Week 12.
Week 12	Nominations	Day 78: Manikuttan, Ramzan, Remya, Rithu, Sai, Soorya were nominated for the 12th Week eviction process.
Week 12	Luxury Budget Task	Day 79–81: Bhargavi Nilayam: The background of the task is a valley full of mysteries and its ancient Bigg Boss bungalow. There have been many unfortunate deaths. There is also a very famous cemetery in that valley. Bigg Boss house will be transformed into a ghost house and contestants will be portraying different characters. Manikuttan successfully killed Sai, Firoz A, and Anoop. Remya (Anglo-Indian women/owner of the bungalow); Firoz A (old lover of Anglo-Indian women/cook); Noby (body guard of Anglo-Indian women); Anoop (security guard of the bungalow); Manikuttan (main killer/unknown guest); Ramzan (killer's assistant/unknown guest); Rithu (adventures women/main police officer); Soorya (adventures women/assistant police officers); Sai (unknown guest); Anoop, Firoz A and Noby were selected as the best performers of the task and were selected for the Week 13 Captaincy Task.
Week 12	Jail	Day 82: Manikuttan and Sai were sent to Jail, due to the lack of involvement in most of the activities conducted.
Week 12	Captaincy Task	Day 84: The participants Anoop, Firoz A, and Rithu has to stand on a rock and drags them across walking to the finish line as soon as possible. Noby selected as the best performers of the task and were selected for the Week 13 Captaincy Task, later he substitute Rithu to play for captaincy task due to health issues. And Anoop Krishnan took less time to finish the line, and he became the captain of Week 13.
Week 12	Safe	Day 84: Sai, Rithu, Manikuttan, Ramzan, Remya Soorya received enough votes to stay in the competition and they were safe.
Week 12	Exits	None
Week 13	Entrances	Day 88: Dimpal Bhal re-entered the Bigg Boss House.
Week 13	House Captain	Day 84–91: Anoop Krishnan was the House Captain of Week 13.
Week 13	Nominations	Day 78: Manikuttan, Ramzan, Remya, Rithu, Sai, Soorya were nominated for the 13th Week eviction process.
Week 13	Luxury Budget Task	Day 86–87: Pavakoothu: The housemates are divided into two teams Kids and Dolls. Dolls should do all task given by Kids. And Kids should bring out dolls to hit the quit button. If the Dolls hit the quit button they out of the game. Firoz A declared himself as the caretaker of the Kids. Team A: Noby, Remya, Sai, Soorya; Team B: Anoop, Manikuttan, Ramzan, Rithu; Manikuttan, Noby, and Ramzan were selected as the best performers of the task and were selected for the Week 14 Captaincy Task.
Week 13	Jail	Day 89: Remya and Sai were sent to Jail, due to the lack of involvement in most of the activities conducted.
Week 13	Captaincy Task	Day 89: The participants Manikuttan, Noby and Ramzan has to collect the maximum number of balls from a specially arranged muddy field. Noby substitute Anoop to play for him. Anoop had won the task fastest and Noby was declared as winner. Later he handed over his captaincy to Rithu Manthra, and she became the House Captain of Week 14.
Week 13	Safe	Day 91: Ramzan, Sai, Rithu, Manikuttan received enough votes to stay in the competition and they were safe.
Week 13	Exits	Day 90: Remya Panicker was evicted from the house after facing a public vote Day 91: Soorya Menon was evicted from the house after facing a public vote
Week 14	Entrances	None
Week 14	House Captain	Day 91–95: Rithu Manthra was the House Captain of Week 14.
Week 14	Nominations	Day 92: Anoop, Dimpal, Firoz A, Manikuttan, Noby, Sai were nominated for the 14th Week eviction process.
Week 14	Ticket to Finale	Day 93–94: Ticket to Finale: All the housemates need to participate in all of the tasks part of the ticket to finale. All the housemates receive points on how they play each task given. Eventually, the housemate with the most points at the end wins the ticket to the finale and enters the finale.: Housemate / Ticket To Finale Tasks & Points; Housemate / Task 1: Box of Balls / Task 2: Cycle Pedalling / Task 3: Cheettukottaram / Task 4: Kuzhalpanthukali / Task 5: Balloons tied Legs / Total Points; Dimpal / 7 / 1 / 8 / −1 / 6 / 21; Anoop / 8 / 1 / 4 / −1 / 8 / 20; Ramzan / 7 / 1 / 8 / −1 / 1 / 16; Noby / 6 / 1 / 3 / −1 / 5 / 14; Sai / 3 / 1 / 6 / −1 / 4 / 13; Firoz A / 1 / 1 / 7 / −1 / 3 / 11; Rithu / 2 / 1 / 1 / −1 / 7 / 10; Manikuttan / 5 / 1 / 2 / −1 / 2 / 9
Week 14	Jail	None
Week 14	Captaincy Task	None
Week 14	Safe	None
Week 14	Exits	Day 95: Anoop Krishnan, Firoz Azeez, Dimpal Bhal, Manikuttan, Noby Marcose, Ramzan Muhammed, Rithu Manthra, Sai Vishnu were sent to the home due to global COVID-19 pandemic situation.
Week 15 Finale	Finalists	During the final week the public vote for who they want to win Bigg Boss Malayalam Season 3. The finalists for the title were as following: Anoop Krishnan; Dimpal Bhal; Firoz Azeez; Manikuttan; Noby Marcose; Ramzan Muhammed; Rithu Manthra; Sai Vishnu
Week 15 Finale	Grand finale	All evicted and ejected contestants except Bhagyalakshmi attended the grand finale function. Special performances by Anu Sithara, Grace Antony, Tini Tom, Veena Nair, Kalabhavan Prajod, Saniya Iyappan, Suraj Venjaramood etc. were there in the final day.
Week 15 Finale	7th runner-up	Noby Marcose became the 7th runner-up from the house after facing the public vote. Peace maker of the season title
Week 15 Finale	6th runner-up	Rithu Manthra became the 6th runner-up from the house after facing the public vote. Nightingale of the season title
Week 15 Finale	5th runner-up	Firoz Azeez became the 5th runner-up from the house after facing the public vote. Mind gamer of the season title
Week 15 Finale	4th runner-up	Anoop Krishnan became the 4th runner-up from the house after facing the public vote. Gamer of the Season title
Week 15 Finale	3rd runner-up	Ramzan Muhammed became the 3rd runner-up from the house after facing the public vote. Charmer of the Season title
Week 15 Finale	2nd runner-up	Dimpal Bhal became the 2nd runner-up from the house after facing the public vote. Energizer of the Season title
Week 15 Finale	1st runner- up	Sai Vishnu became the 1st runner-up from the house after facing the public vote. Dreamer of the Season title
Week 15 Finale	Winner	Manikuttan was declared the winner of the house after facing the public vote and he won the Bigg Boss Malayalam Season 3. Entertainer of the season title

== Nominations table ==
	Week 1	Week 2	Week 3	Week 4	Week 5	Week 6	Week 7	Week 8	Week 9	Week 10	Week 11	Week 12	Week 13	Week 14		Week 15			
	Week 1	Week 2	Week 3	Week 4	Week 5	Week 6	Week 7	Week 8	Week 9	Week 10	Week 11	Week 12	Week 13	Day 92	Day 95	Day 105			
Nominees for House Captaincy	Bhagyalekshmi; Lekshmi	All; Housemates	Lekshmi; Manikuttan; Noby	Adoney; Firoz A Noby	Anoop; Firoz A Firoz K & Sajna; Manikuttan; Ramzan	Firoz A Manikuttan; Rithu	Dimpal; Firoz K & Sajna; Sai	Firoz K & Sajna; Manikuttan; Ramzan	Dimpal; Firoz A Ramzan	Adoney; Anoop; Sandhya	Dimpal; Remya; Sandhya	Adoney; Anoop; Ramzan	Anoop; Firoz A Rithu	Manikuttan; Noby; Ramzan		No; Nominees			
House Captain	Bhagyalakshmi	Soorya	Manikuttan	Noby	Ramzan	Firoz A	Sai	Manikuttan	Ramzan	Adoney	Remya	~~Adoney~~; Anoop	Anoop	~~Noby~~; Rithu		No; Captain			
Captain's Nominations	No; Nominations	Rithu; Bhagyalakshmi	Bhagyalakshmi; Sai	Firoz K & Sajna; Sandhya	Majiziya; Dimpal	Firoz K & Sajna; Majiziya	Firoz A Bhagyalakshmi	Firoz K & Sajna; Sandhya	Not Eligible	Sai; Rithu	Firoz A Soorya	Remya; Sai	Not Eligible	Sai; Anoop		No; Nominees			
Vote to:	None	Evict													None	WIN			
Manikuttan	No; Nominations	Firoz A Dimpal	House; Captain	Firoz A Sai	Anoop; Firoz A	Ramzan; Anoop	Adoney; Firoz A	House; Captain	Safe	Sandhya; Soorya	Walked (Day 71)	Noby; Remya	Nominated	Firoz A Noby	Sent; Home (Day 95)	No; Nominations	Finalist	Winner (Day 105)	
Sai	No; Nominations	Firoz A Lekshmi	Dimpal; Soorya	Manikuttan; Firoz K & Sajna	Dimpal; Majiziya	Firoz K & Sajna; Dimpal	House; Captain	Adoney; Firoz A	Nominated	Dimpal; Sandhya	Firoz A Adoney	Rithu; Soorya	Nominated	Firoz A Ramzan	Sent; Home (Day 95)	No; Nominations	Finalist	1st Runner-up (Day 105)	
Dimpal	No; Nominations	Sai; Rithu	Sai; Bhagyalakshmi	Adoney; Soorya	Rithu; Sai	Soorya; Sai	Noby; Firoz K & Sajna	Sai; Firoz K & Sajna	Safe	Sai; Soorya	Noby; Soorya	Walked (Day 74)		Noby; Anoop	Sent; Home (Day 95)	No; Nominations	Finalist	2nd Runner-up (Day 105)	
Ramzan	No; Nominations	Dimpal; Manikuttan	Soorya; Dimpal	Manikuttan; Firoz K & Sajna	House; Captain	Majiziya; Manikuttan	Bhagyalakshmi; Sandhya	Firoz K & Sajna; Sai	House; Captain	Dimpal; Remya	Sai; Anoop	Manikuttan; Rithu	Nominated	Sai; Manikuttan	Sent; Home (Day 95)	No; Nominations	Finalist	3rd Runner-up (Day 105)	
Anoop	No; Nominations	Firoz A Rithu	Adoney; Sai	Rithu; Bhagyalakshmi	Firoz K & Sajna; Dimpal	Dimpal; Sai	Firoz A Ramzan	Rithu; Sai	Safe	Rithu; Sandhya	Firoz A Sai	House; Captain		Dimpal; Firoz A	Sent; Home (Day 95)	No; Nominations	Finalist	4th Runner-up (Day 105)	
Firoz A	No; Nominations	Sandhya; Rithu	Anoop; Rithu	Manikuttan; Firoz K & Sajna	Firoz K & Sajna; Remya	House; Captain	Anoop; Firoz K & Sajna	Firoz K & Sajna; Sai	Safe	Dimpal; Anoop	Sai; Anoop	Sai; Manikuttan	Safe	Manikuttan; Sai	Sent; Home (Day 95)	No; Nominations	Finalist	5th Runner-up (Day 105)	
Rithu	No; Nominations	Firoz A Dimpal	Soorya; Dimpal	Soorya; Remya	Majiziya; Remya	Soorya; Bhagyalakshmi	Anoop; Soorya	Adoney; Sandhya	Nominated	Anoop; Soorya	Sai; Adoney	Remya; Sai	Nominated	House; Captain	Sent; Home (Day 95)	No; Nominations	Finalist	6th Runner-up (Day 105)	
Noby	No; Nominations	Rithu; Sai	Soorya; Dimpal	House; Captain	Firoz K & Sajna; Majiziya	Firoz K & Sajna; Dimpal	Firoz K & Sajna; Soorya	Firoz K & Sajna; Sai	Safe	Dimpal; Rithu	Sai; Anoop	Rithu; Soorya	Safe	Dimpal; Manikuttan	Sent; Home (Day 95)	No; Nominations	Finalist	7th Runner-up (Day 105)	
Soorya	No; Nominations	House; Captain	Bhagyalakshmi; Sandhya	Dimpal; Firoz K & Sajna	Firoz K & Sajna; Dimpal	Firoz K & Sajna; Anoop	Bhagyalakshmi; Firoz K & Sajna	Firoz K & Sajna; Adoney	Safe	Dimpal; Sai	Sai; Rithu	Sai; Remya	Nominated	Evicted (Day 91)					
Remya	Not In House		Entered (Day 12)	Angel; Rithu	Firoz A Rithu	Evicted (Day 35)		Exempt	Safe	Dimpal; Sandhya	House; Captain	Rithu; Soorya	Nominated	Evicted (Day 90)					
Adoney	No; Nominations	Bhagyalakshmi; Lekshmi	Dimpal; Anoop	Manikuttan; Firoz K & Sajna	Rithu; Remya	Firoz K & Sajna; Soorya	Anoop; Sandhya	Sai; Rithu	Nominated	House; Captain	Sai; Anoop	Evicted (Day 77)							
Sandhya	No; Nominations	Rithu; Lekshmi	Soorya; Dimpal	Firoz K & Sajna; Soorya	Firoz K & Sajna; Remya	Firoz K & Sajna; Dimpal	Firoz K & Sajna; Ramzan	Firoz K & Sajna; Sai	Nominated	Anoop; Sai	Evicted (Day 70)								
Firoz K & Sajna	Not In House	Entered (Day 8)	Nominated	Angel; Soorya	Majiziya; Rithu	Sandhya; Adoney	Noby; Soorya	Adoney; Soorya	Nominated	Ejected (Day 58)									
Bhagyalakshmi	House; Captain	Sandhya; Adoney	Dimpal; Soorya	Firoz K & Sajna; Soorya	Dimpal; Firoz K & Sajna	Dimpal; Majiziya	Firoz K & Sajna; Anoop	Evicted (Day 49)											
Majiziya	No; Nominations	Lekshmi; Rithu	Bhagyalakshmi; Sai	Rithu; Angel	Sai; Rithu	Noby; Rithu	Evicted (Day 42)												
Angel	Not In House		Entered (Day 13)	Firoz K & Sajna; Soorya	Evicted (Day 28)														
Michelle	Not In House	Entered (Day 8)	Nominated	Evicted (Day 21)															
Lekshmi	No; Nominations	Sandhya; Adoney	Evicted (Day 14)																
Notes	1 , 2	3, 4	5, 6, 7	None				8, 9, 10	11, 12, 13, 14	15, 16, 17	18, 19, 20, 21	22 , 23 , 24	25 , 26 , 27	28 , 29 , 30 , 31	32	33 , 34 , 35 , 36 , 37 , 38 , 39 , 40 , 41 , 42			
Against Public Vote	No; Nominations	Adoney; Bhagyalakshmi; Dimpal; Firoz A Lekshmi; Rithu; Sai; Sandhya	Anoop; Bhagyalakshmi; Dimpal; Firoz K & Sajna; Michelle; Sai; Soorya	Angel; Firoz K & Sajna; Manikuttan; Rithu; Soorya	Dimpal; Firoz A Firoz K & Sajna; Majiziya; Remya; Rithu; Sai	Anoop; Dimpal; Firoz K & Sajna; Majiziya; Sai; Soorya	Anoop; Bhagyalakshmi; Firoz A Firoz K & Sajna; Noby; Ramzan; Sandhya; Soorya	Adoney; Firoz K & Sajna; Rithu; Sai; Sandhya	~~Adoney~~; ~~Firoz K~~; ~~& Sajna~~; ~~Rithu~~; ~~Sai~~; ~~Sandhya~~	Anoop; Dimpal; Rithu; Sai; Sandhya; Soorya	Adoney; Anoop; Firoz A Ramzan; Sai; Soorya	Manikuttan; Ramzan; Remya; Rithu; Sai; Soorya	Manikuttan; Ramzan; Remya; Rithu; Sai; Soorya	~~Anoop~~; ~~Dimpal~~; ~~Firoz A~~; ~~Manikuttan~~; ~~Noby~~; ~~Sai~~	Housemates in Quarantine (Day 95)	Anoop; Dimpal; Firoz A Manikuttan; Noby; Ramzan; Rithu; Sai			
Walked	None										Manikuttan	None			Housemates in Quarantine (Day 95)	None			
Walked	None										Dimpal	None			Housemates in Quarantine (Day 95)	None			
Ejected	None								Firoz K & Sajna	None					Housemates in Quarantine (Day 95)	None			
Re-entered	None							Remya	None		Manikuttan	None	Dimpal	None	Housemates in Quarantine (Day 95)	None			
Evicted	No; Eviction	Lekshmi Jayan	Michelle	Angel	Remya	Majiziya	Bhagyalakshmi	No; Eviction		Sandhya	Adoney	No; Eviction	Remya	No; Eviction	Housemates in Quarantine (Day 95)	Noby	Rithu	Firoz A	Anoop
Evicted	No; Eviction	Lekshmi Jayan	Michelle	Angel	Remya	Majiziya	Bhagyalakshmi	No; Eviction		Sandhya	Adoney	No; Eviction	Soorya	No; Eviction	Housemates in Quarantine (Day 95)	Ramzan	Dimpal	Sai	Manikuttan

=== Notes ===
Color key
indicates the Nominees for house captaincy.
indicates the House Captain.
indicates that the Housemate was directly nominated for eviction prior to the regular nominations process.
indicates that the Housemate was granted immunity from nominations.
indicates the winner.
indicates the first runner up.
indicates the second runner up.
indicates the third runner up.
indicates the fourth runner up.
indicates a new wildcard contestant.
indicates that the housemate has Re-Entered.
indicates that the Housemate was in the Secret Room.
indicates the contestant has been Ejected.
indicates the contestant has been Walked Out of the show.
indicates the Eviction Free Pass has been used on a housemate.
indicates the contestant has been Evicted.

- ^Note 1 : No nomination and eviction procedures on week 1.
- ^Note 2 : On Week 1 Bhagyalakshmi became the first captain of the season 3.
- ^Note 3 : Firoz Khan & Sajna Firoz, Michelle Daniel entered the Bigg Boss house as Wildcard Contestants.
- ^Note 4 : Firoz Khan & Sajna Firoz, Michelle Daniel were exempted from the nomination and eviction procedures.
- ^Note 5 : Angel Thomas and Remya Panicker entered the Bigg Boss house as Wildcard Contestants.
- ^Note 6 : Angel Thomas and Remya Panicker were exempted from the nomination and eviction procedures.
- ^Note 7 : Firoz Khan & Sajna Firoz, Michelle Daniel were directly nominated for Week 3, for breaking Bigg Boss house rules.
- ^Note 8 : On Day 49, ex-contestant Remya Panicker re-entered the Bigg Boss house as a wildcard.
- ^Note 9 : Remya Panicker was exempted from the nomination and eviction procedures.
- ^Note 10 : Weekend episode and Eviction process for Week 8 were scrapped due to the celebration of Vishu.
- ^Note 11 : Week 8 nominated housemates were still in the eviction process for the week 9.
- ^Note 12: 8th week nominated housemates directly nominated and other housemates were safe for the 9th week.
- ^Note 13: On Day 58 Firoz Khan and Sajna Firoz were ejected from the show for violating the rules.
- ^Note 14: The Week 9 eviction process was cancelled due to the Firoz Khan & Sajna Firoz ejection process.
- ^Note 15: On Week 10, Bigg Boss announced this time housemates having the first open nomination where housemates need to select two housemates and nominate them in front of the other housemates.
- ^Note 16: During a task conducted in Week 9, Firoz Azeez, Manikuttan and Ramzan Muhammed were granted immunity for the following week's nomination process.
- ^Note 17: On Day 64 Ramzan Muhammed rejected his nomination free card.
- ^Note 18: Ramzan Muhammed were directly nominated for coming three weeks, for breaking bigg boss house rules.
- ^Note 19: On Day 71 Manikuttan decide to quit, and later Bigg Boss announced that he is going temporarily out of the Bigg Boss house.
- ^Note 20: On Day 74 Manikuttan re-entered the Bigg Boss house.
- ^Note 21: On Day 74 Dimpal Bhal quit the show due to her father's death.
- ^Note 22: On Week 11, Adoney T John won captaincy and become the captain of Week 12. However Adoney T John got evicted on Day 77 and was directly removed from Captaincy.
- ^Note 23: Adoney T John was given the option to select a captain between Anoop Krishnan and Rithu Manthra and he selected Anoop Krishnan as the Week 12 House Captain.
- ^Note 24: On Week 12, eviction process cancelled this week due to the ongoing high-risk pandemic situation.
- ^Note 25: Week 12 nominated housemates were still in the eviction process for the week 13
- ^Note 26: 12th week nominated housemates directly nominated and other housemates were safe for the 13th week.
- ^Note 27: On Day 88 Dimpal Bhal re-entered the Bigg Boss house.
- ^Note 28: On Week 13, Noby Marcose handed over his Captaincy to Rithu and she became the last captain of the season 3.
- ^Note 29: On Week 14, Bigg Boss announced this time housemates having the second open nomination where housemates need to select two housemates and nominate them in front of the other housemates.
- ^Note 30: On Day 95 the show stopped temporarily due to global COVID-19 pandemic situation.
- ^Note 31: On Day 95, Anoop Krishnan, Firoz Azeez, Dimpal Bhal, Manikuttan, Noby Marcose, Ramzan Muhammed, Rithu Manthra, Sai Vishnu were sent home due to COVID-19.
- ^Note 32:
- ^Note 33: On Week 15 Anoop Krishnan, Firoz Azeez, Dimpal Bhal, Manikuttan, Noby Marcose, Ramzan Muhammed, Rithu Manthra, Sai Vishnu were directly nominated for finale.
- ^Note 34: Anoop Krishnan, Firoz Azeez, Dimpal Bhal, Manikuttan, Noby Marcose, Ramzan Muhammed, Rithu Manthra, Sai Vishnu were announced as Top 8 finalists o the Bigs Season 3.
- ^Note 35: Noby Marcose became the 7th Runner-up.
- ^Note 36: Rithu Manthra became the 6th Runner-up.
- ^Note 37: Firoz Azeez became the 5th Runner-up.
- ^Note 38: Anoop Krishnan became the 4th Runner-up.
- ^Note 39: Ramzan Muhammed became the 3rd Runner-up.
- ^Note 40: Dimpal Bhal became the 2nd Runner-up.
- ^Note 41: Sai Vishnu became the 1st Runner-up.
- ^Note 42: Manikuttan became the Winner.
