= K. G. Shankar =

Indian politician (1950–2021)

Nominated Member of Puducherry Legislative Assembly
- In office 4 July 2017 – 17 January 2021
- Preceded by: n/a
- Succeeded by: T. Vikraman
- Constituency: Nominated Member

Personal details
- Born: 26 August 1950 Puducherry
- Died: 17 January 2021 (aged 70) Ilango Nagar, Puducherry
- Party: Bharatiya Janata Party

K. G. Shankar (26 August 1950 – 17 January 2021) was an Indian politician and member of the Bharatiya Janata Party. Shankar was a member of the Puducherry Legislative Assembly from 3 June 2017 till his death on 17 January 2021 as he was nominated by the Central Government of India. He was a nominated MLA, named by the Government of India. He was Treasurer of the BJP's Puducherry unit.
