= Vaseem Iqbal =

First tribal person from the Andaman and Nicobar Islands to receive a PhD

- Education: Department of Disaster Management, Port Blair (affiliated with Pondicherry University)
- Employer(s): Central Agriculture Research Institute, Port Blair

Vaseem Iqbal is the first tribal person from the Andaman and Nicobar Islands to receive a PhD. He is currently employed by the Central Agriculture Research Institute in Port Blair as a researcher.

== Doctorate ==
In 2015, he submitted his PhD thesis "Sea Water Intrusion Along East and West Coasts of South Andaman Islands", which detailed several ways that seawater intrusion in the islands could be alleviated using geophysical and geochemical techniques. In October 2016, he was awarded his doctorate, but it took authorities a couple of months to verify if he was the first tribal person from the Andaman and Nicobar Islands to be a PhD holder.

== Personal life ==
He lost both his parents in 2007, which put his plans of a PhD in jeopardy. However, compensation from the Indian Government from the 2004 tsunami helped him to pay and complete his education. He belongs to the Nicobarese tribe.
