= Majiziya Bhanu =

Indian powerlifter

Personal information
- Nationality: Indian
- Born: Kozhikode, Kerala, India
- Occupation: Dental surgeon
- Website: https://drmajiziyabhanu.in

Sport
- Country: India
- Sport: Powerlifting; Arm wrestling

Majiziya Bhanu is an Indian body builder and power lifter from Kerala.

== Biography ==
Majiziya is from Kozhikode, Kerala. She is the daughter of Abdul Majeed and Razia Majeed. She began her training in powerlifting after taking a boxing class while in college to study dentistry. She decided to compete after her then-fiancé (now husband, Nour Ahmad Kohan Alizaey) showed her pictures of Muslim women competing while wearing a hijab, because she would not participate in competitions without wearing one. Soon after she began training, she competed in the Kozhikode District Powerlifting Championship in July 2016.

She has since completed a Bachelor of Dental Surgery from the Mahe Institute of Dental Sciences and is a dental surgeon.

In 2021, she was a contestant on Bigg Boss (Malayalam season 3).

== Bodybuilding and powerlifting career ==
By 2018, Majiziya had been named the strongest woman of Kerala by the Kerala State Powerlifting Association three times. Her first bodybuilding competition was in the women's division of the Mr Kerala Championship on February 25, 2018, which she won. She was the first competitor to wear a hijab at the event. She also represented India at the World Armwrestling Championship in Turkey in 2018.

== Achievements in international level ==
- She started her international achievements by winning a silver medal in the Asian Powerlifting Championship in May 2017 held at Indonesia.
- She again won a silver medal in the same year at the Asian Classic Powerlifting Championship (Dead lift) in December 2017 held at Alappuzha, Kerala, India.
- In 2018 she won two gold medals - World champion (gold medal) in the Powerlifting World Cup December 2018 and a gold medal in the World Deadlift Championship in December 2018 held at Moscow, Russia.
- She won the Best Lifter Award in Powerlifting World Cup December 2018, Moscow, Russia
- In 2019 she became the world champion again -World champion (gold medal) in Powerlifting World Cup December 2019, Moscow, Russia
- She got the 6th rank in the World Arm Wrestling Championship in October 2018 held at Antalya, Turkey
- 2020 Best Lifter Award in the World Powerlifting Association's World Cup held in Moscow.

== Achievements ==
- Gold Medal in National Unequipped Powerlifting Championship in March 2017 held at Jammu and Kashmir.
- Gold Medal in National Arm Wrestling Championship in May 2018 held at Lucknow, Uttar Pradesh.
- Gold medal in Kerala State Arm Wrestling Championship in April 2018 held at Trissur, Kerala.
- Gold medal in All Kerala Interclub Powerlifting Championship in December 2017 held at Kollam, Kerala
- Gold medal in Kerala State Powerlifting Championship in August 2017 held at Trivandrum, Kerala
- Gold Medal in Kerala State Unequipped Powerlifting Championship in February 2017 held at Cherthala, Kerala.
- Won the title 'Strong Woman of Kerala 2017' in February 2017 held at Cherthala, Kerala.
- Gold medal in Kerala State Power Lifting Championship in July 2017 held at Kannur, Kerala.
- Gold Medal in Kerala State Unequipped Power Lifting Championship in July 2017 held at Kannur, Kerala.
- Won the title 'Strong Woman of Kerala 2017' in July 2017 held at Kannur, Kerala.
- Gold medal in Women's Model Physique 2018 (Miss Kerala Fitness and Fashion 2018) in February 2018 held at Kochi, Kerala.
- Gold medal in Kerala State Bench Press Championship in February 2018 held at Alappuzha, Kerala.
- Best Lifter of the year 2018 Alappuzha, Kerala.
