= Police tactical unit (disambiguation) =

A police tactical unit (PTU) is a highly trained police unit that tactically manages and resolves high-risk incidents, including terrorist incidents.

Police Tactical Unit may also refer to:

- Police Tactical Unit (Hong Kong)
- Police Tactical Unit (Singapore)
- PTU: Police Tactical Unit, a 2003 Hong Kong crime thriller film

== See also ==
- List of police tactical units
