= Sushrut Badhe =

Indian writer

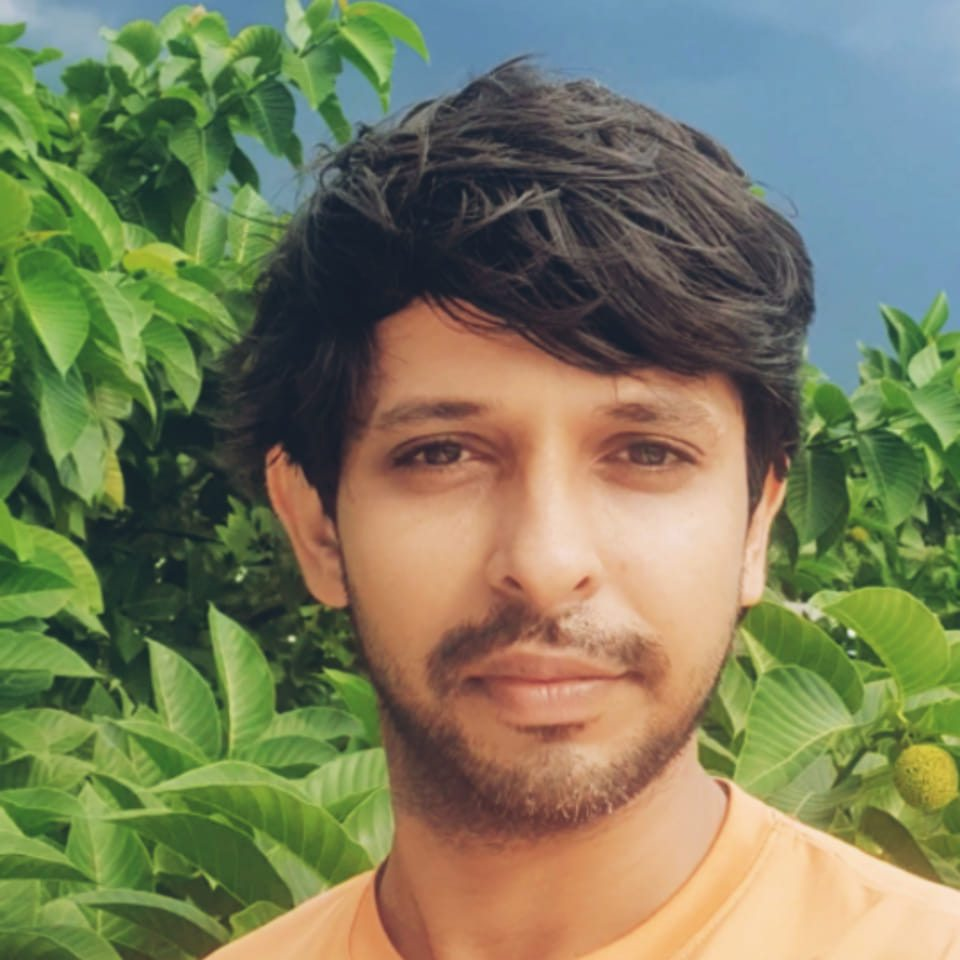
- Born: 21 April 1990 (age 36)
- Education: Pondicherry Engineering College
- Occupations: Author, manufacturer, researcher
- Organization(s): KVM Research Laboratories, Midam Foundation and Pingla Insitute

Sushrut Badhe (Sanskrit: सुश्रुत् बढे, born 21 April 1990) is an Indian author, researcher and manufacturer of Ayurvedic products. He has published rhymed English renderings of the Bhagavad Gita and the Isha, Kena, and Mandukya Upanishads.

== Early life and family ==
Badhe is the son of Ashok Badhe, an anesthesiologist, and Bhawana Badhe, a pathologist. He and his sister Avanti competed in Badminton at the state level.

Badhe graduated in mechanical engineering from Pondicherry Engineering College.

He became a disciple of Madhusudan R. Damle, whom he describes as his guru. Damle encouraged him to render the Bhagavad Gita in verse. Badhe is the chief executive of KVM Research Laboratories, which manufactures and exports Ayurvedic products. He is also secretary of Midam Foundation.

During Badhe's tenure as chief executive of KVM Research Laboratories in Puducherry, the company established its Mruga Ayurveda division to pursue collaborative research in ayurvedic Veterinary medicine. Badhe is also research director at the Pingla Institute's Center for Hindu Studies in Sydney.

== Writing ==
In 2014, Badhe published the poetry collection The Rhythm of the Spirit. Former Indian President A. P. J. Abdul Kalam expressed appreciation for "A Father's song", one of the poems in the collection. That year, Badhe also released Voice of Krishna: Secrets of the Self, an e-book that renders the opening chapters of the Bhagavad Gita in English verse.

In 2015, Sri Aurobindo's Action published Bhagavad Gita: Rhythm of Krishna, Badhe's rhymed English rendering of all 700 verses. The India Book of Records listed the complete rendering that year. The Bhandarkar Oriental Research Institute included Bhagavad Gita: Rhythm of Krishna among the representative works listed under "Works by Indian Scholars" in its nomination dossier for UNESCO's Memory of the World Register. By 2016, Badhe had also published rhymed renderings of Isha, Kena and Mandukya Upanishads as separate books.

Badhe's Sri Aurobindo's Vedanta: Rhythm of Ananda is an English verse rendering of a Sanskrit work by Sri Aurobindo. The book was launched in the Pondicherry–Auroville Poetry Festival 2022. His Rhythm of the Veda: Know your Devas presents selected Rig Veda hymns in English verse, with commentary drawing on Sri Aurobindo's interpretation of the Veda. Badhe has also contributed to the journal Sri Aurobindo's Action.

== Gita teaching and research ==
Badhe and Bhawana Badhe helped design and conduct Krishna's Butter, a program introducing schoolchildren to the Bhagavad Gita under the guidance of Madhusudan R. Damle. The teaching materials draw on Badhe's English verse rendering, Bhagavad Gita: Rhythm of Krishna. Badhe has also conducted workshops for adults. In 2026, Badhe and his co-authors reported a comparative study that measured dispositional mindfulness in adults who had attended the Rhythm of Krishna workshops and in a comparison group. Badhe presented the study at the 2026 Mind, Brain and Consciousness conference at IIT Mandi.

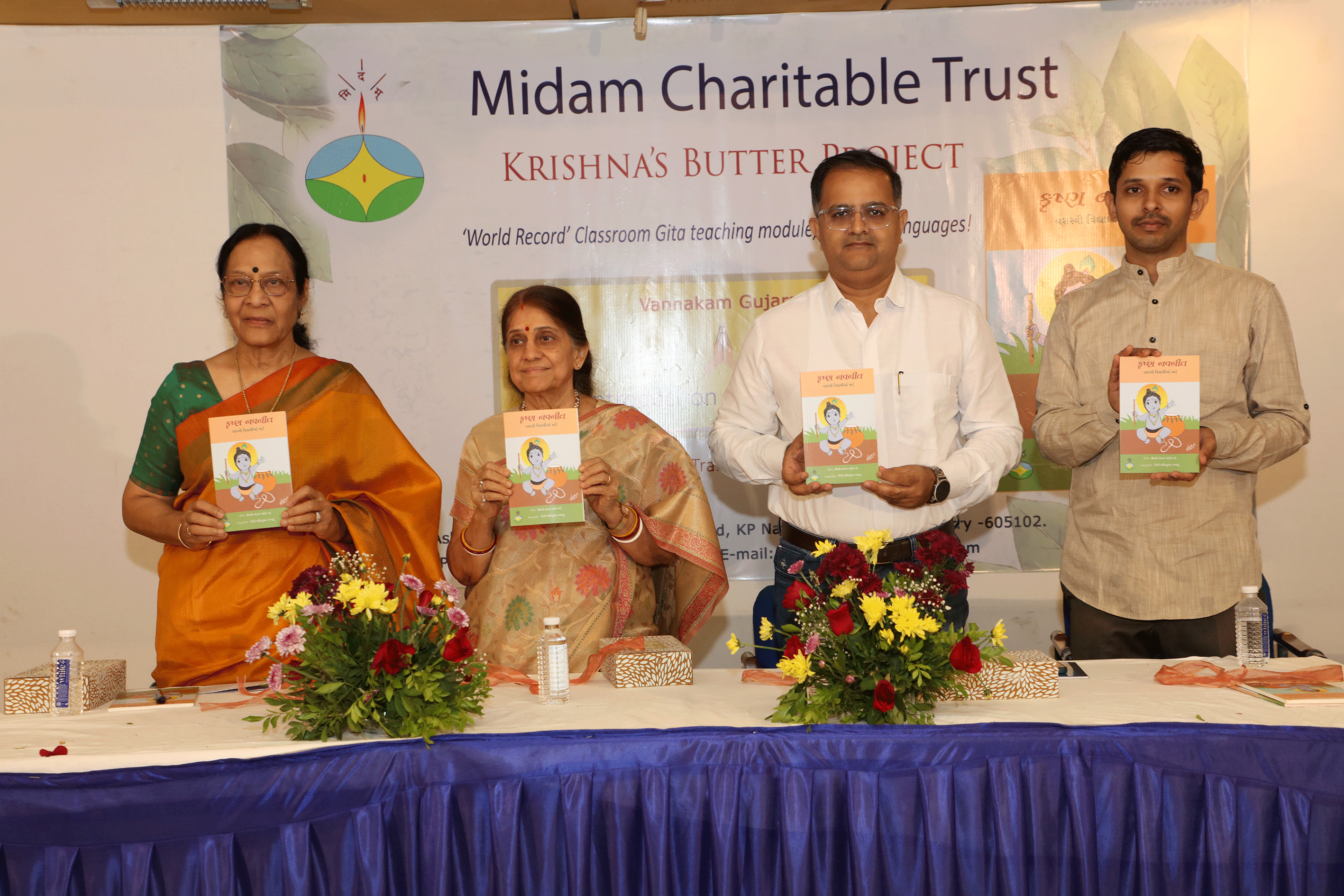
Unveiling of Gujarati edition of Krishna's Butter

Badhe has also co-authored research on how computer systems translate and analyze the Bhagavad Gita. A 2023 study in Natural Language Processing Journal compared Google Translate's Sanskrit-to-English rendering of the Gita with published English translations. A 2024 study in IEEE Access tested whether large language models could identify metaphors in English translations of the Bhagavad Gita and the Sermon on the Mount. In a separate 2021 article in the Journal of Religion and Health, Badhe and his co-authors discussed the relevance of the Bhagavad Gita to moral injury among health care workers during the COVID-19 pandemic.

At the 2023 World Sanskrit Conference at Srinivas University in Mangalore, two papers by Badhe won prizes. One examined nutritional psychiatry concepts in the Bhagavad Gita, and the other reviewed experiences and challenges in implementing Vedic Chants Intervention Program for children with special needs.

== Vedic Chants Intervention Program (VCIP) ==
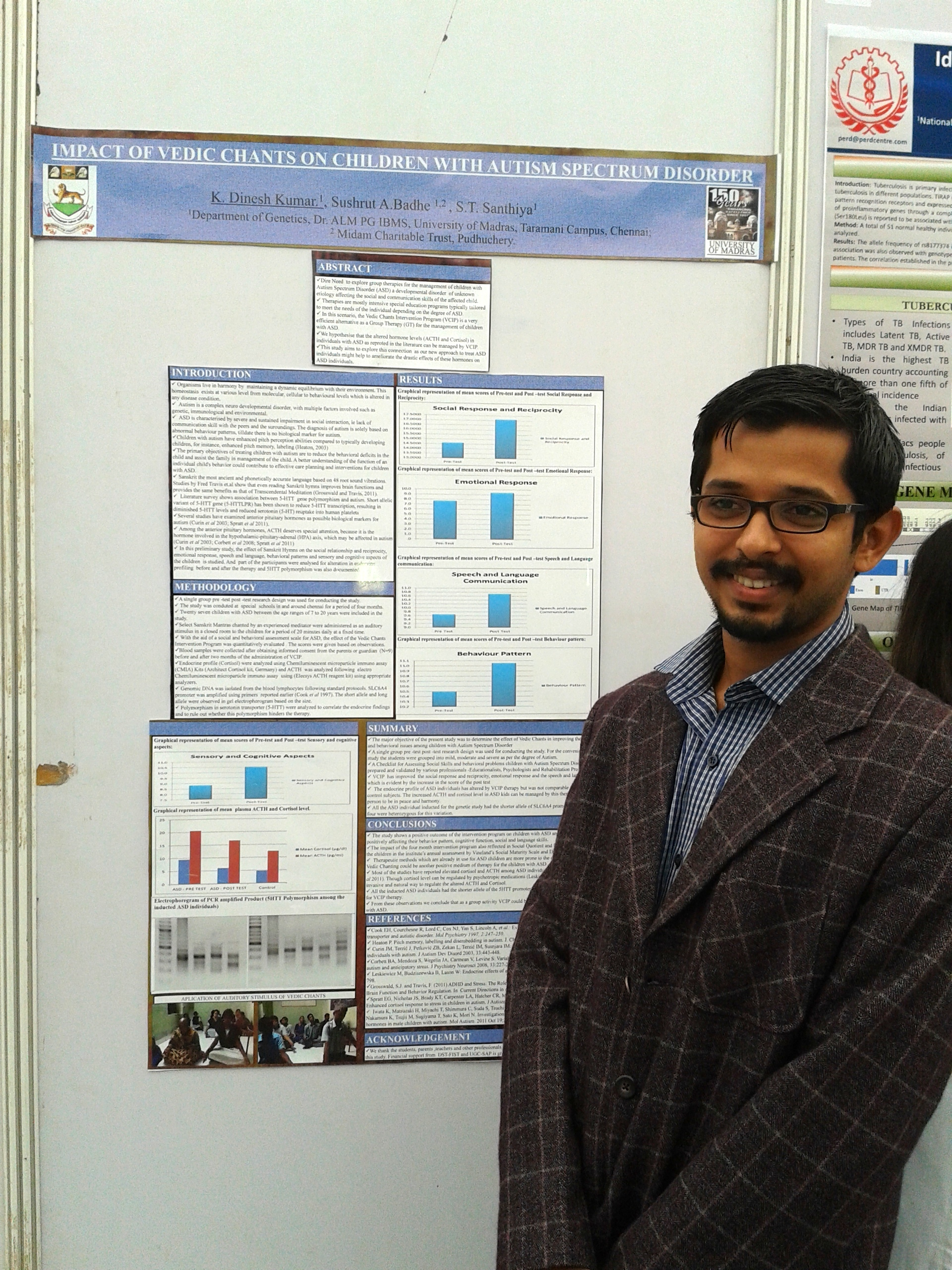
Badhe presenting research on Vedic Chanting among children with Autism Spectrum Disorder (ASD) at the International Conference ISHG 2014, Ahmedabad.

The Vedic Chants intervention Program (VCIP) began in 2012, when Madhusudan R Damle chanted Vedic hymns at Satya special school in Puducherry. In 2013, his disciple, Badhe began using recordings of Damle's chanting in sessions with autistic children in Puducherry. Badhe later co-authored two conference abstracts on the program. The first published in 2014, described a study involving children in special schools in and around Chennai. The second presented by Badhe and his team at the JIPMER Research Day in 2024, described a one month study involving 81 children.

According to JIPMER the team received the Indian Academy of Neurology's Neurorehabilitation Initiative of the year award and the award lecture focused on Vedic Chants study.

== Bibliography ==
- Rhythm of the Spirit by Sushrut Badhe, Cyberwit.net, 2014
- Voice of Krishna: Secrets of the Self by Sushrut Badhe, Independently Published, 2014
- Bhagavad Gita: Rhythm of Krishna by Sushrut Badhe, Sri Aurobindo's Action Publications, 2015
- A Glimpse of the Spirit: Compilations from Sri Aurobindo's Action - the Journal of India's Resurgence by Sushrut Badhe, Independently Published, 2019
- Rhythm of the Veda: Know your Devas by Sushrut Badhe, Midam Charitable Trust Publications, 2021
- Sri Aurobindo's Vedanta: Rhythm of Ananda by Sushrut Badhe, Midam Charitable Trust Publications, 2022
- Krishna's Art of War by Sushrut Badhe and Lt. Col. Makarand Alur, Garuda Prakashan, 2026, ISBN 9788169720335.
