= R. B. Ashok Babu =

Indian politician

Nominated Member of Puducherry Legislative Assembly
- Incumbent
- Assumed office May 11, 2021
- Preceded by: T. Vikraman
- Constituency: Nominated Member

Personal details
- Party: Bharatiya Janata Party
- Other political affiliations: Indian National Congress
- Education: L.L.B.
- Profession: Advocate

R. B. Ashok Babu is an Indian politician and member of the Bharatiya Janata Party. Ashok Babu is a member of the Puducherry Legislative Assembly from May 11, 2021, as he was nominated by the Central Government of India.
