= Thalapula Palli =

- village
- Interactive map of Thalapula Palli
- Location in Andhra Pradesh, India
- Country: India
- State: Andhra Pradesh
- District: Chittoor
- Talukas: Thalapula Palli

Population
  - Total: 1,100 - 1,300

Languages
  - Official: Telugu
- Time zone: UTC+5:30 (IST)
- PIN: 517124
- Lok Sabha constituency: chittoor

Thalapula Palli or Thalupulapalle (Village ID 596460), is a village in Puthala Pattu Mandal in Chittoor district in the state of Andhra Pradesh in India. According to the 2011 census it has a population of 1762 living in 468 households. Its main agriculture product is gur growing.
