= Puducherry Technological University =

Public and Research University in Pondicherry

Coordinates: 12°00′47.74″N 79°51′13.78″E

- Former name: Pondicherry Engineering College (PEC)
- Motto: Fortifying with Wisdom
- Type: Public
- Established: 1984; 42 years ago (under VII Five Year Plan)
- Affiliations: UGC, AICTE
- Chancellor: Lieutenant Governor of Puducherry
- Vice-Chancellor: Dr. S. Mohan (Institute Chair Professor, IIT Madras)
- Undergraduates: 2,200
- Postgraduates: 300
- Location: PTU Campus, East Coast Road, Pillaichavadi, Puducherry, 605014, India
- Campus: 180 acres (0.73 km^{2})
- Website: http://www.ptuniv.edu.in

Puducherry Technological University (PTU) is a Government Funded Technical institute (GFTI) under central government and Ministry of Education of India, public technical and research university of the Union Territory of Puducherry.

It enrolls nearly 2,500 students.

== History ==
The institute was established in 1984 by The Ministry of Education, Government of India under the Seventh Five Year Plan as Pondicherry Engineering College (PEC) with the approval of University Grants Commission and was affiliated to Pondicherry University.

Pondicherry Engineering College became Puducherry Technological University in 2021. The inauguration as a university was done by M. Venkaiah Naidu, the then vice president of India, on 13 September 2021.

== Campus ==
The campus is situated at Pillaichavady, a locality of Pondicherry. It is 12 km from the Puducherry railway station. It is 11 km away from the Pondicherry Airport. Buses from both Pondicherry and Chennai can be taken for going to the college.

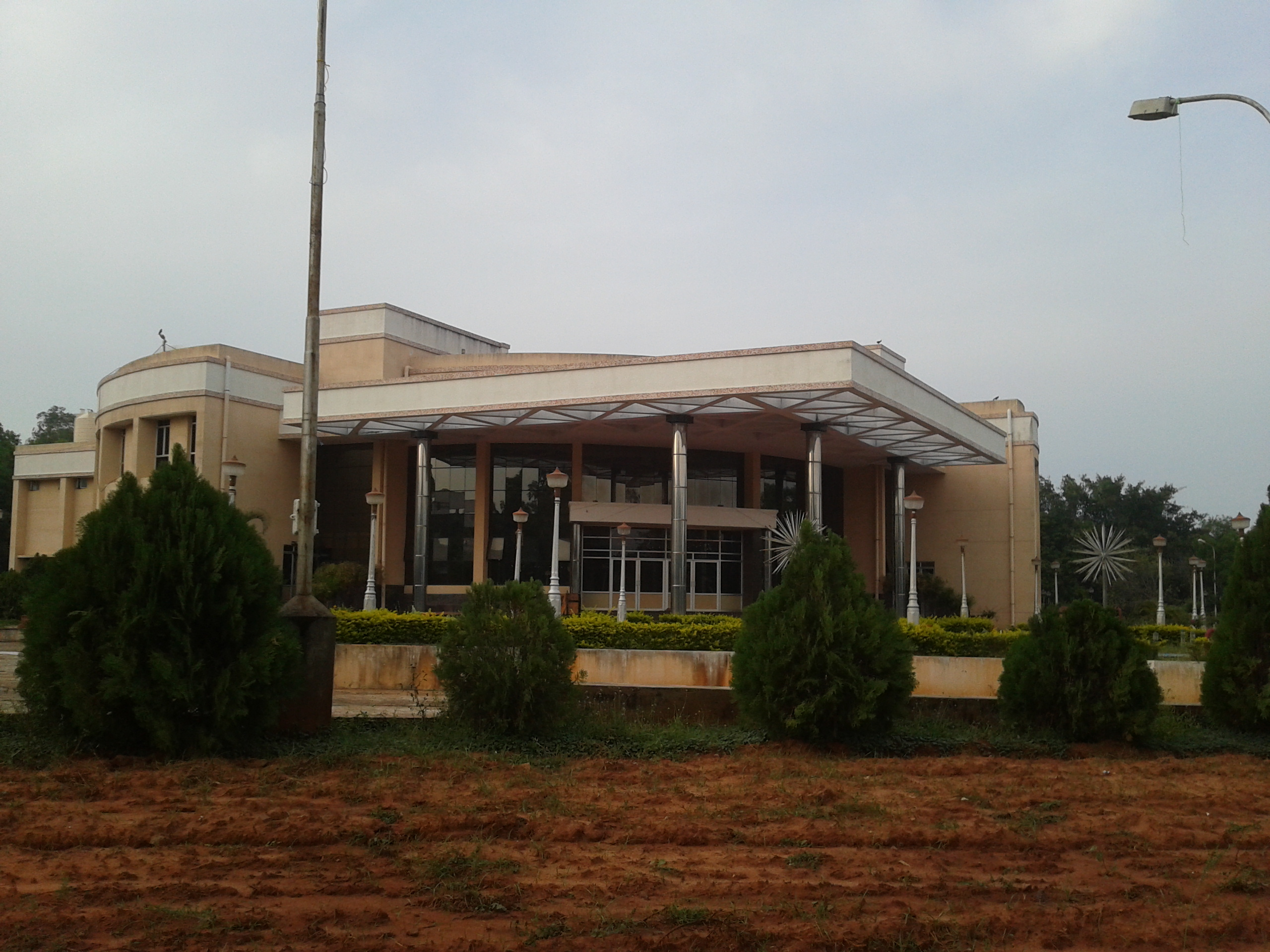
University Auditorium

The 180 acres (0.73 km^{2}) of the campus has departmental buildings, an auditorium, library, hostels, students' amenities centre, open-air theatre, residential quarters for staff and laid out with roads, lawns and gardens. The central library has over 48000 books, 72 national journals, 98 international journals and INDEST (Indian National Digital Library of Science and Technology), this facility is available for the use of staff and students.

There are sports facilities for football, cricket, basketball, athletics and more.

== Academics ==
The university offers undergraduate programs in engineering. It offers postgraduate programs in sciences, engineering and business administration. It also has doctoral programs.

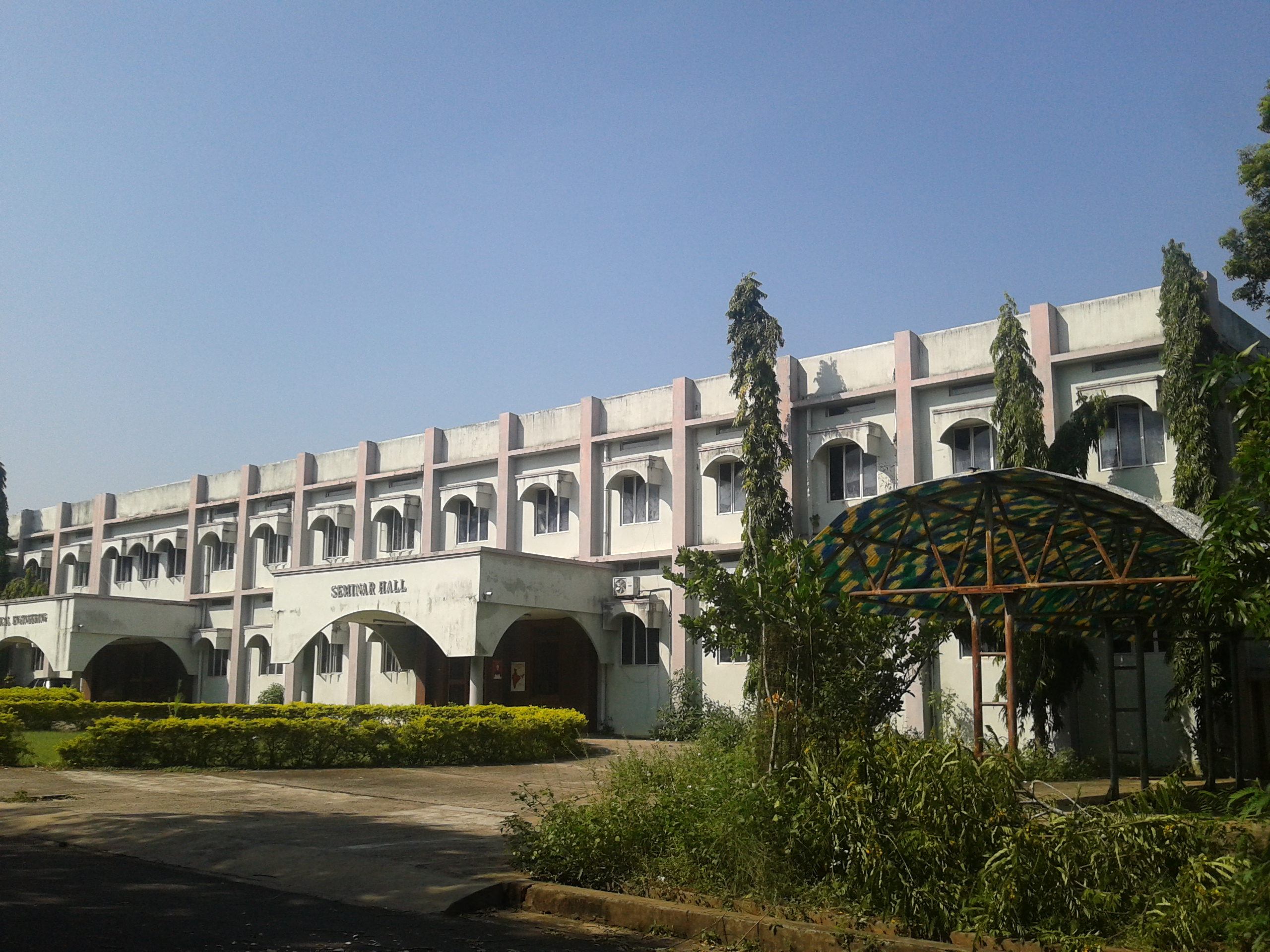
Chemical Engineering Department

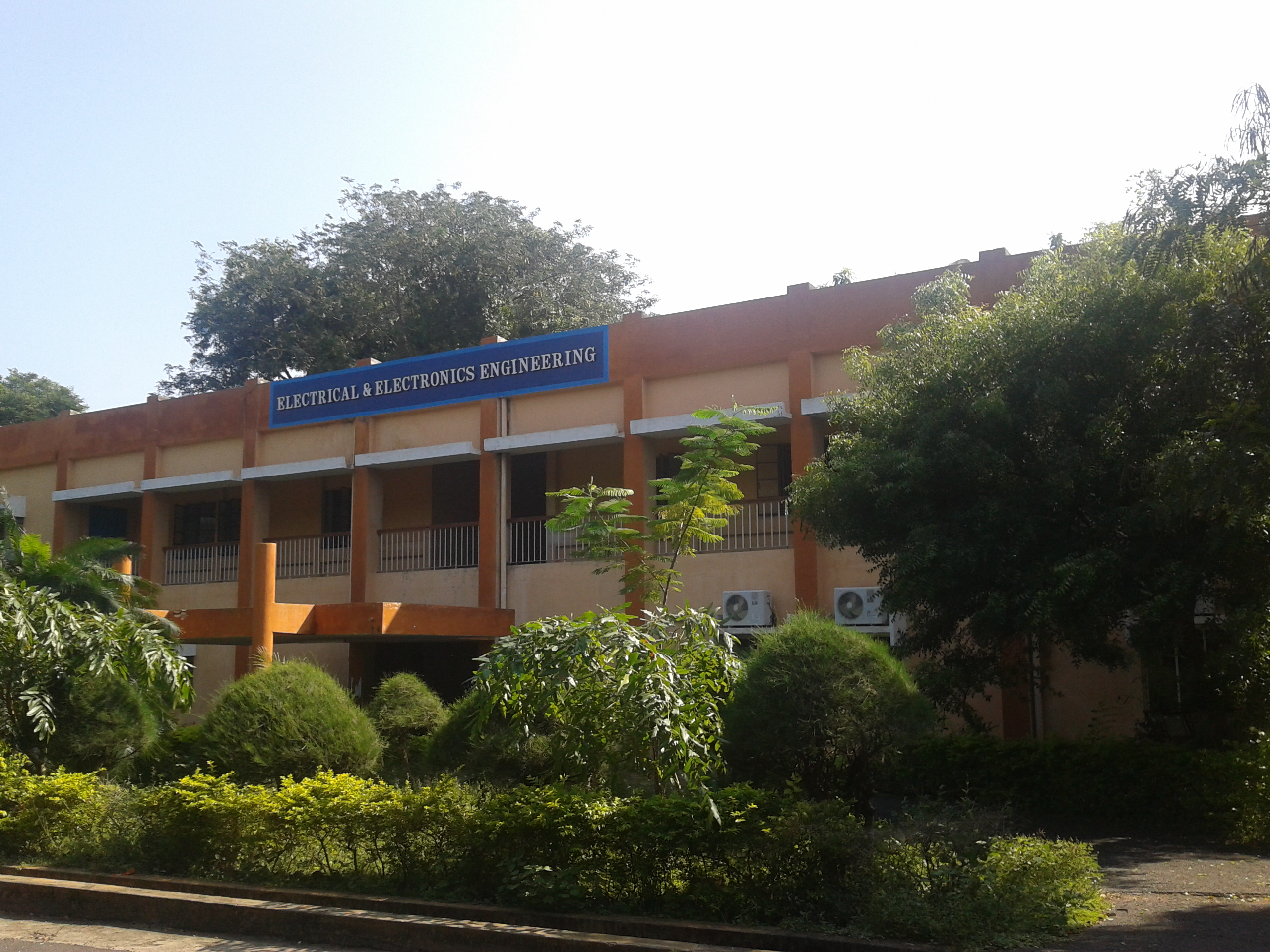
Electrical & Electronics Engineering department

There are 14 departments.

Engineering:

- Electronics and Communication Engineering
- Electrical and Electronics Engineering
- Computer Science and Engineering
- Information Technology
- Electronics and Instrumentation Engineering
- Chemical Engineering
- Mechanical Engineering
- Civil Engineering
- Mechatronics

Science:

- Mathematics
- Physics
- Chemistry

Humanities and Business:

- Humanities and Social Sciences
- Business Administration

== Constituent and affiliated colleges ==
- Perunthalaivar Kamarajar Institute of Engineering and Technology, Karaikal
- Women's Engineering College, Puducherry

== Student life ==
=== Students' Councils ===
Each department has its own students' council organising various conferences, workshops and seminars on the cutting-edge technologies, to teach students the latest trends in their field. The councils also encourage students to conduct various online and offline events to help them network with staff and fellow students.

=== Cybyrus ===
Cybyrus is a symposium conducted by student's council of the computer science department. Cybyrus 2k20 was conducted with the participation of more than 1000 students from different colleges.

=== Revelation ===
Revelation is a quadrennial technical festival of the Department of Electronics and Instrumentation Engineering, managed by the student council of EIE, fusion. It showcased various creative and technical ideas of students from all over India.

=== Genesis ===
Genesis is a Quadrennial technical festival organised by students of the electronics and communication engineering department of PEC. A wide range of competitions, workshops and events are organised once every 4 years to familiarize students with new technologies. The latest version of Genesis was named Genesis 2K19 featured a paper presentation competition, robot wars, a technical quiz, a poster presentation, and a design competition. It also hosted a technical workshop on Robotics which was a grand workshop in which students from all over Tamil Nadu participated.

=== Intronix ===
Intronix is an annual inter collegiate technical festival organised by students of the electronics and instrumentation engineering department of PEC. The fest was launched to encourage interest in robotics and technology. A wide range of competitions, workshops and events are organised every year to familiarize students with new technologies.

=== Marakriti ===
Marakriti (robot in Sanskrit), the school's robotics club, was started on the year 2009. The goal of Marakrithi is to boost interest in the cross discipline areas of robotics, including mechanical engineering, electronics, and software development.

=== Mechnium ===
Mechnium is a Quadrennial Technical festival organised by the students of the Mechanical Engineering department on behalf of the Department of Mechanical Engineering. The latest version of Mechnium was named Mechnium 2K18. It hosted more than 500 participants from more than 100 colleges. MECHNIUM 2K18 featured a paper presentation competition, robo wars, a technical quiz, a poster presentation, and a design competition. It also hosted a technical workshop on the latest topics of mechanical engineering.

== Training and Placement Centre ==
Training and Placement Centre of PTU actively involved in preparing the students to fit them according to the needs of companies. 1 year extensive training in Aptitude, Technical and Coding (Basic and Advanced) are provided to all the students.

== Alumni ==
The alumni includes software engineers, entrepreneurs, professors, civil servants, etc. It also includes the leaders of some top companies of the world.

Some notable alumni include:

- Vijaye Raji, CTO of Applications, OpenAI
- Ragy Thomas, Founder, Sprinklr
- Balaji Palanisamy, Associate Professor, University of Pittsburgh

== Rankings ==
College rankings

Engineering – India
- NIRF (2024): 201-300

The National Institutional Ranking Framework (NIRF) ranked the university in the 201-300 in the engineering rankings in 2024.

== See also ==
- NIT Puducherry
- Pondicherry University
- Jawaharlal Institute of Postgraduate Medical Education and Research
- PTU (disambiguation)
