= Kalapet =

Coordinates: 12°2′4.93″N 79°51′52.24″E

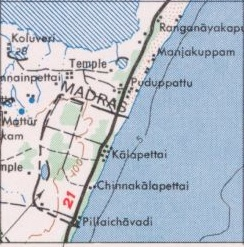
Map of Kalapet in 1955

Kalapet, or Kalapettai, is a town and enclave in the Union territory of Puducherry, India. It was annexed by the French in 1703 and has been a part of the Union territory ever since. It forms a part of the Pondicherry province of the Pondicherry district of the territory.

== Location ==
Kalapet is the northernmost enclave of Pondicherry district and is surrounded on three sides by the Viluppuram district of Tamil Nadu while the Bay of Bengal bounds it on the east. It is cut off from the rest of Puducherry by the state of Tamil Nadu. It is located along the East Coast Road.

It is the location of the Puducherry Central Jail and Pondicherry University.

== See also ==
- Kalapet (Union Territory Assembly constituency)
- Pondicherry University
