= Chola art and architecture =

Art from the period of the imperial Cholas (c. 850 CE – 1250 CE) in South India

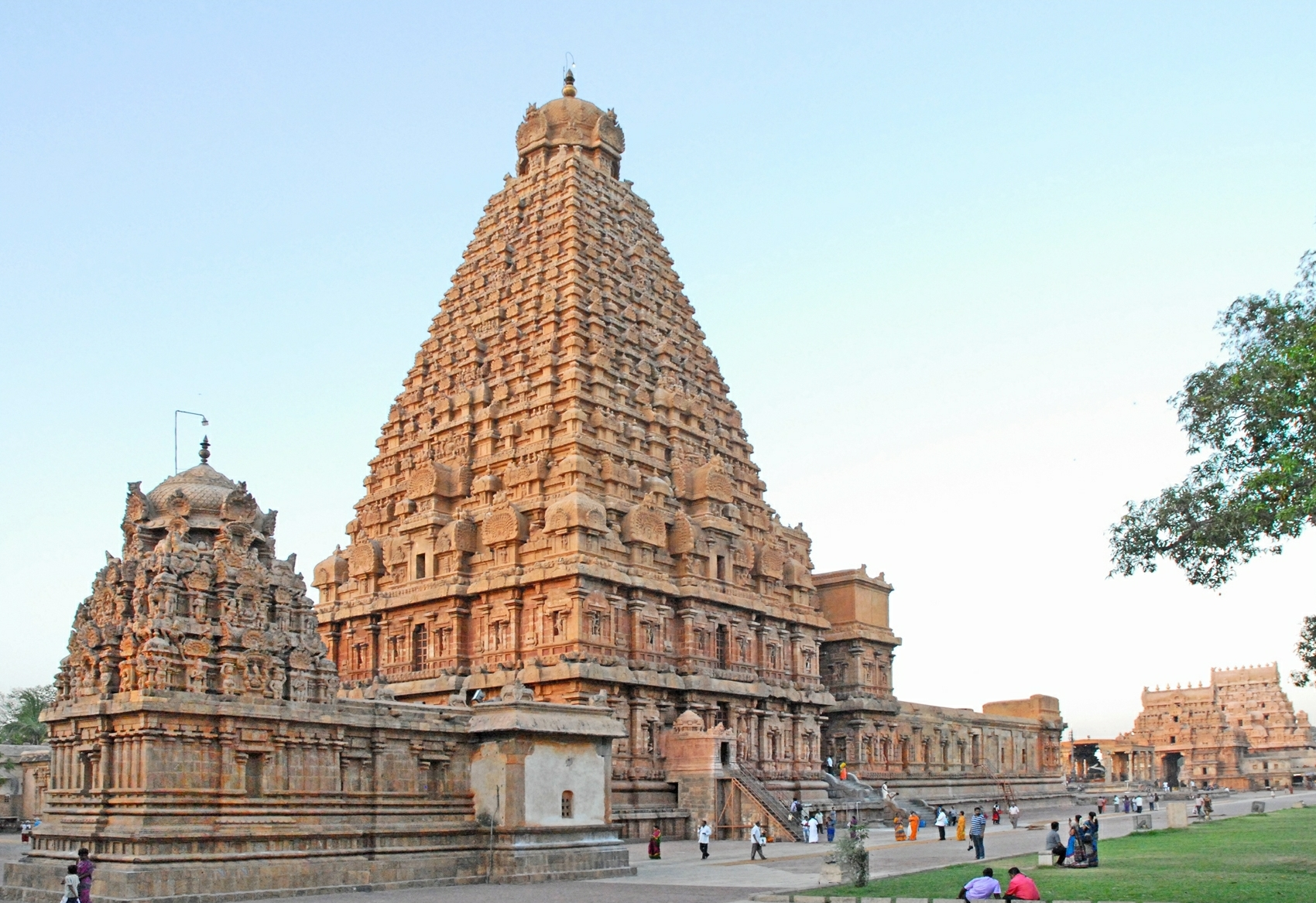
The Brihadisvara Temple at Thanjavur, completed 1010. The vimana in the foreground is still much taller than the gopuras at right.

The period of the imperial Cholas (c. 850 CE – 1250 CE) in South India was an age of continuous improvement and refinement of Chola art and architecture. They utilised the wealth earned through their extensive conquests in building long-lasting stone temples and exquisite bronze sculptures, in an almost exclusively Dravidian cultural setting.

The Cholas built their temples in the traditional way of the Pallava dynasty, who were themselves influenced by the Amaravati school of architecture. The Chola artists and artisans further drew their influences from other contemporary art and architectural schools and elevated the Chola temple design to greater heights. The Chola kings built numerous temples throughout their kingdom, which normally comprised the plains, Central and Northern Tamil Nadu and at times the entire state of Tamil Nadu as also adjoining parts of modern Karnataka and Andhra Pradesh. In the evolution of the Chola temple architecture we can roughly see three major phases, beginning with the early phase, starting with Vijayalaya Chola and continuing till Sundara Chola, the middle phase of Rajaraja Chola and Rajendra Chola when the achievements scaled heights never reached before or since and the final phase during the Chalukya Chola period of Kulottunga I till the demise of the Chola Empire.

The Cholas in addition to their temples, also built many buildings such as hospitals, public utility buildings and palaces. Many such buildings find mention in their inscriptions and in contemporary accounts. The golden palace that Aditya Karikala supposedly built for his father Sundara Chola is an example of such a building. However, such buildings were of perishable materials such as timber and fired bricks and have not survived the ravages of time.

== Early Chola Period ==
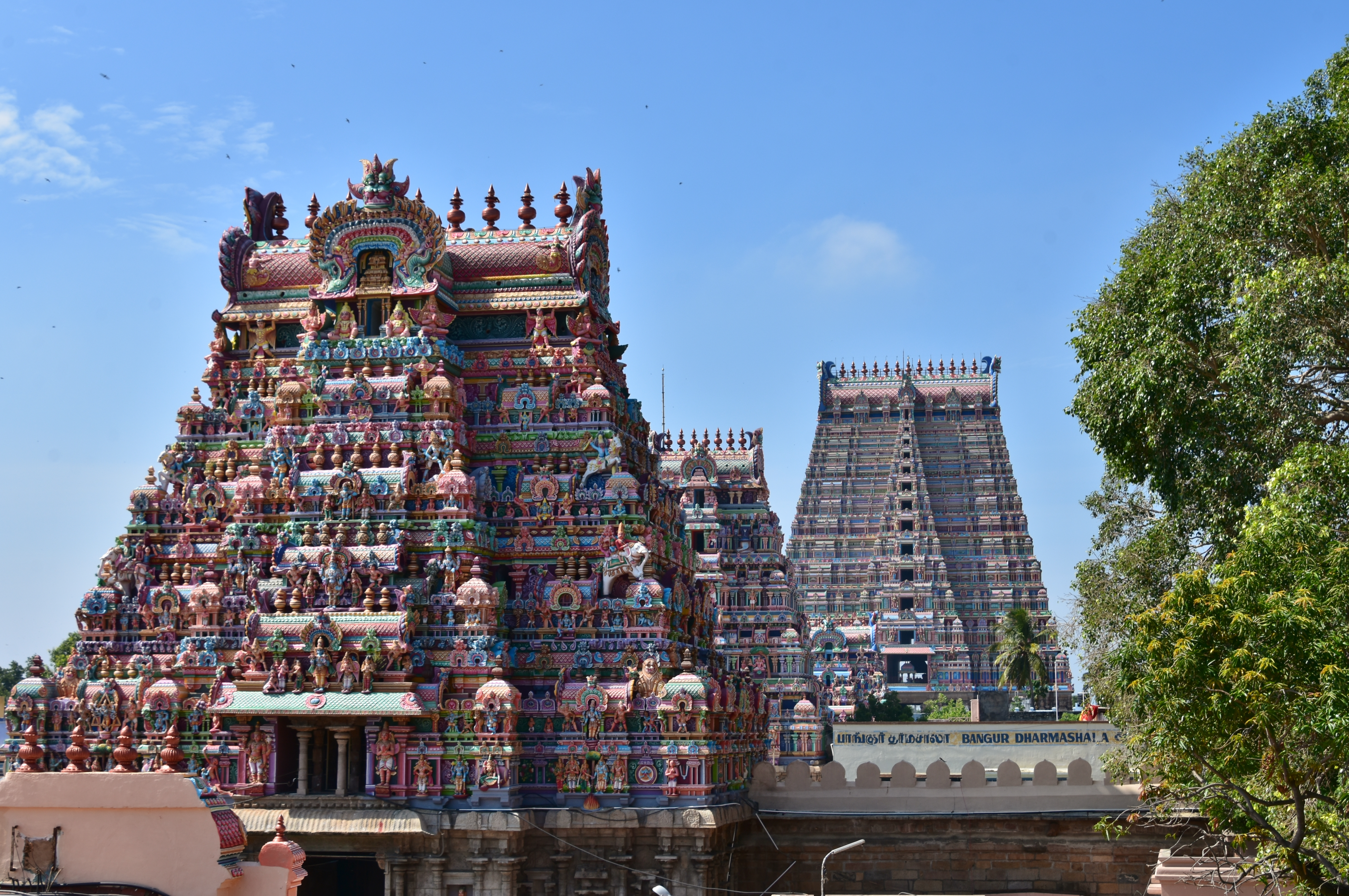
Srirangam Ranganathaswamy temple is the largest functioning religious complex in the world and mentioned in the Sangam literature of the Sangam era (500 BCE - 300 CE)

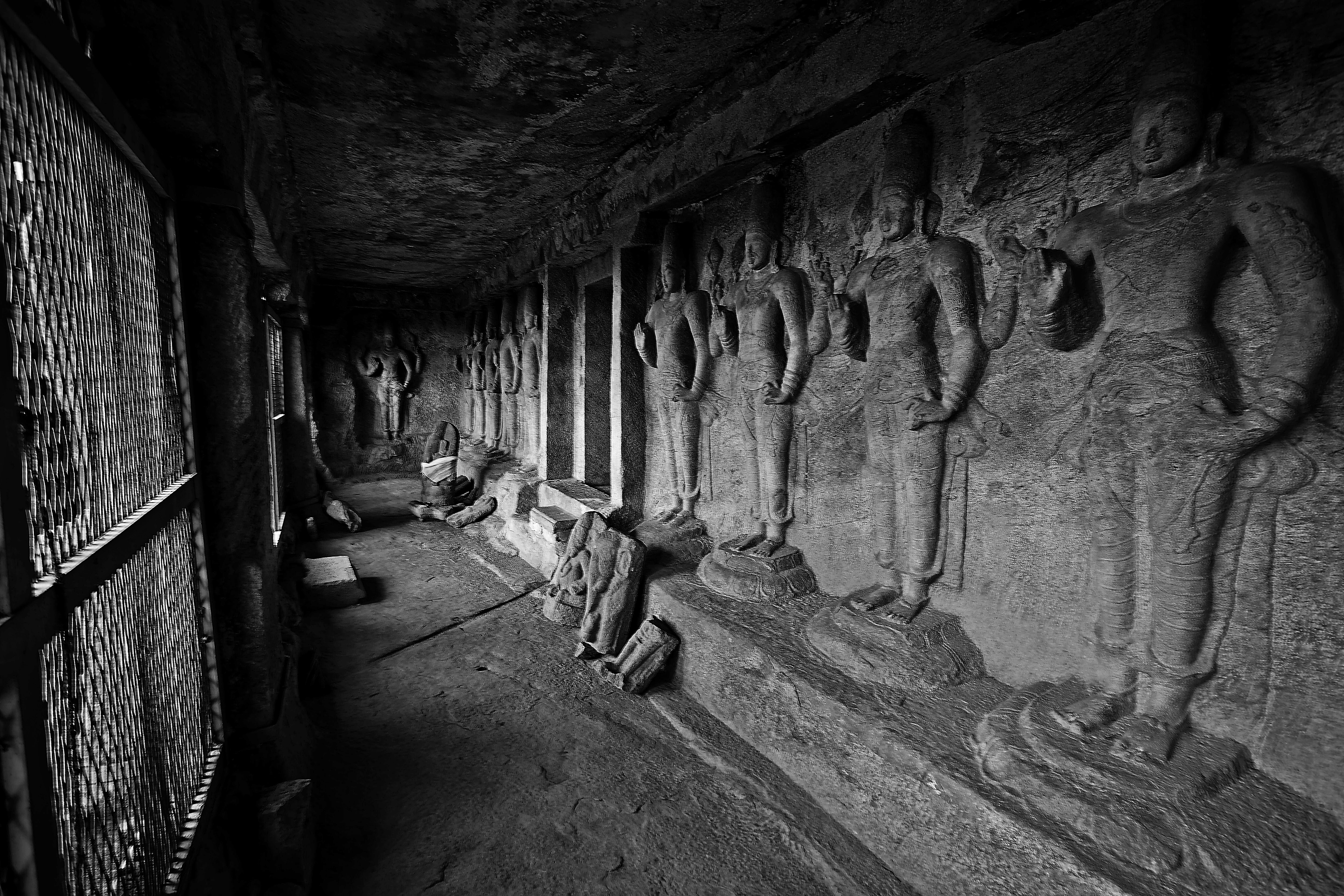
Images of Lord Vishnu in the Vijayalaya Choleeswaram complex

Pallavas were the first recognisable South Indian dynasty who indulged in the pursuit of architectural innovations. The first seeds of Chola temple architecture in Tamil Nadu were possibly sown during this period. The temple architecture evolved from the early cave temples and monolith temples of Mamallapuram to the Vaikunta Perumal temple of Kanchipuram. This architecture style formed the foundation from which the Cholas, who were in close contact with the Pallavas during their periods of decline, took some valuable lessons according to Nilakanta Sastri, in his A History of South India.

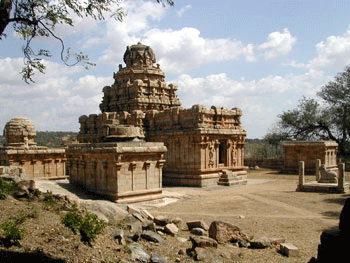
Vijayalaya Choleswaram

The early Cholas built numerous temples. Aditya I and Parantaka I were prolific builders for their faith. Inscriptions of Aditya I record that he built a number of temples along the banks of the river Kaveri. These temples were much smaller in comparison to the huge monumental structures of the later Cholas and were probably brick structures rather than stone.

The Vijayalaya Choleeswaram near Pudukkottai in Tamil Nadu is an example of a surviving early Chola building. The style of this structure clearly shows Pallava influences in the design. It has an unusual arrangement of a circular garba griha (where the deity resides) within a square prakara - circumbulatory corridor. Above this rises the vimana or the tower in four diminishing storeys of which the lower three are square and the top circular. Each level is separated from the next by a cornice. The whole structure is surmounted by a dome which in turn is topped with a stone kalasa - a crest. Very faint traces of paintings can be seen inside on the walls. There are carvings and rock cut temples similar to the Pallava architecture dedicated to Lord Vishnu. There are 12 Life sized sculptures of Maha Vishnu present in the temple. These paintings are dated not earlier than the 17th century. The little temple of Nageswara at Kumbakonam is also of the same period.

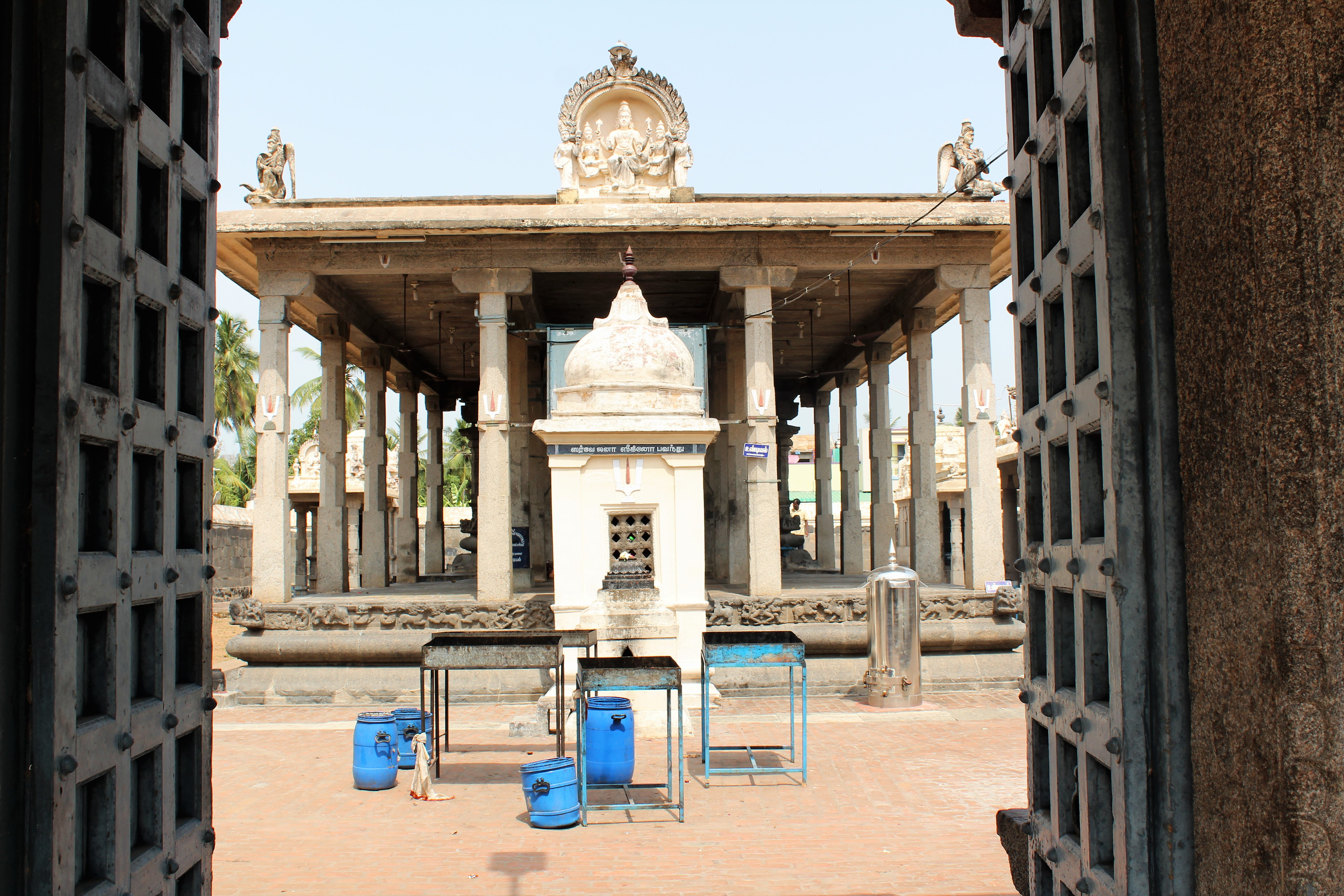
View of the Varadharaja Perumal Temple.

The Varadharaja Perumal Temple is dedicated to the Hindu god Maha Vishnu. It is located in Thirubuvanai, a village, located 23 km (14 mi), in the outskirts of Puducherry. Constructed in the Dravidian style of architecture, the temple is a storehouse of Chola architecture and built by Parantaka I (907-950 CE). The temple has inscriptions from the time of Parantaka I, Rajaraja Chola (985–1014 CE), Rajadhiraja I (c. 1048 CE) and is indicated as an educational institution operating in the temple teaching the Vedas and Shastras. There is also mention of the remuneration to the teachers and students in the form of paddy. The temple is maintained and administered by the Archaeological Survey of India as a protected monument.

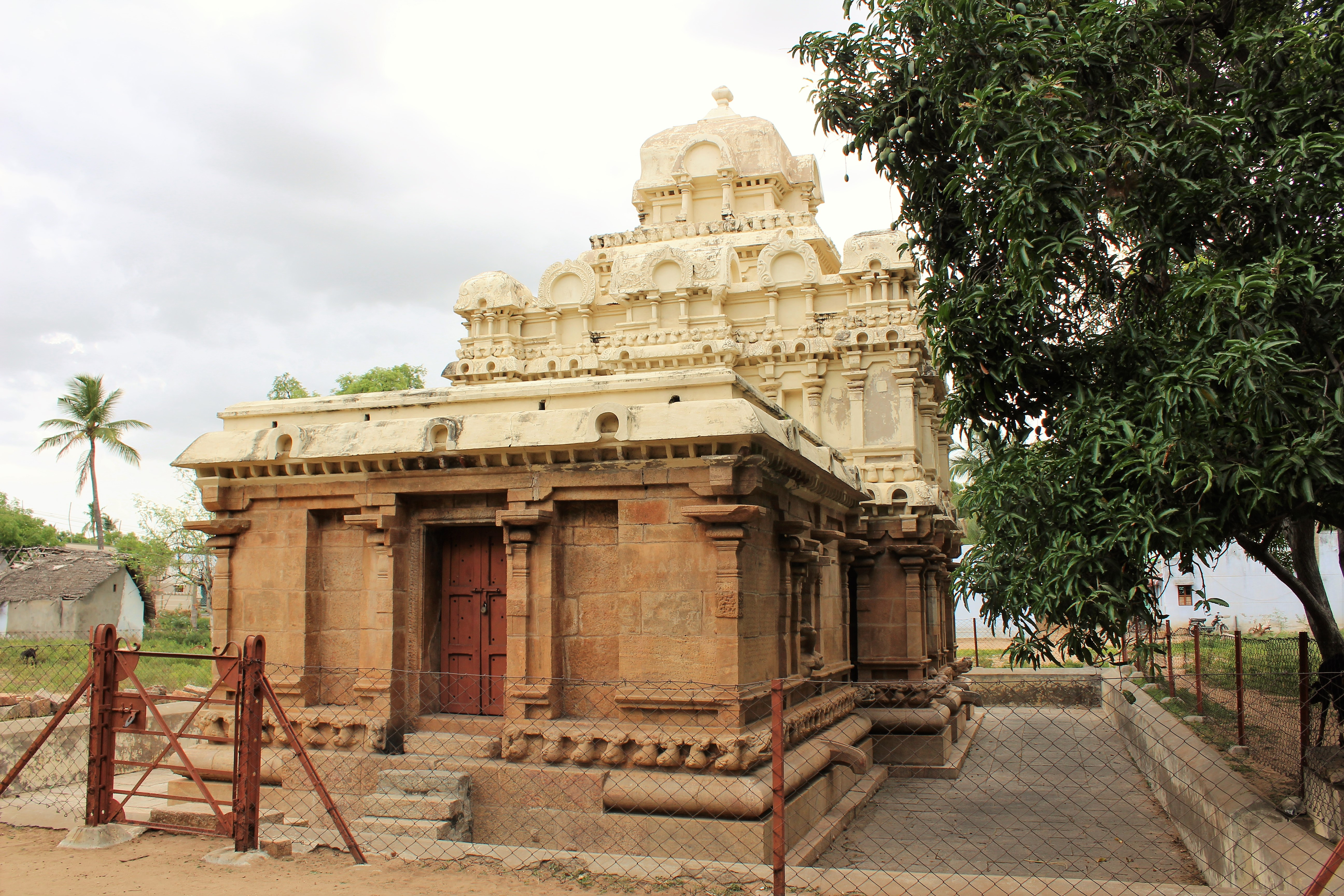
View of the Koranganatha Temple.

The Koranganatha Temple dedicated to Lord Ranganatha (a form of Maha Vishnu) at Srinivasanallur near Thottiyam is an example of the period of Parantaka I. The temple was constructed by the Medieval Cholas. The temple is protected by the Archaeological Survey of India (ASI). This temple is situated on the banks of the river Kaveri, and is a small temple with beautiful sculptures on every surface. The base of the wall has a row of sculpted mythical animals that were a unique feature of Chola architecture. The first floor is made of bricks which have been plastered.According to historian Harle, the temple is counted among the four early extant temples of the Chola Empire.

Muvarkovil Temple in the Pudukkottai area was built by a feudatory of Parantaka II during the second half of the tenth century. As the name suggests, the temple complex has three main shrines standing side by side in a row dedicated to Lord Shiva, along the north-south direction, facing west. Out of these three, only two, the central and southern vimanams (towers) are now extant. Of the third or the northern shrine, the basement alone remains. The architectural style of these shrines exhibit clear concordance with the later Chola temples.

== Medieval Period ==
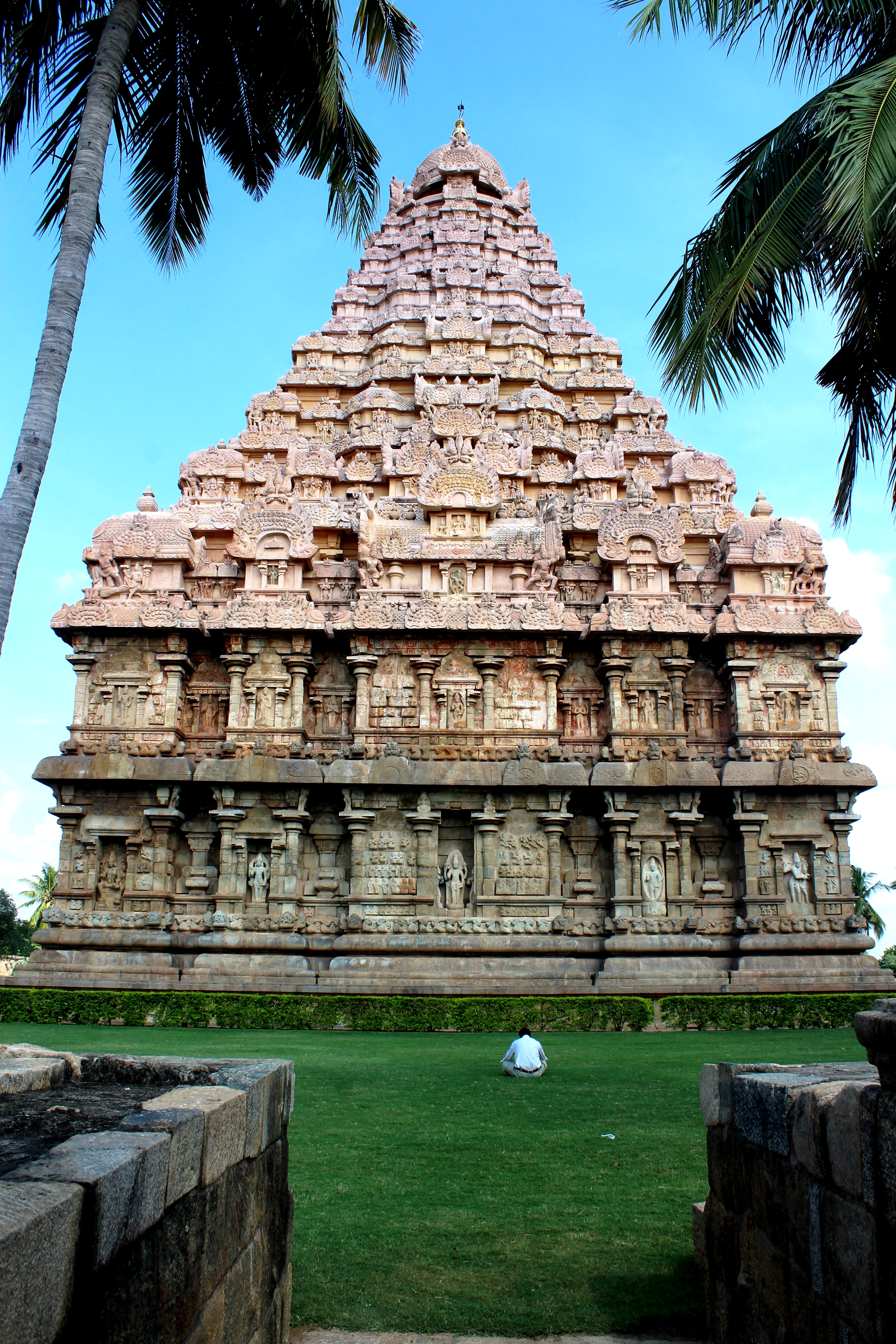
Gangaikonda Cholapuram

Temple building received great impetus from the conquests and the genius of Rajaraja Chola and his son Rajendra Chola I. A number of smaller shrines were built during the early phase of this period. Notable amongst these is the Tiruvalisvaram temple near Tirunelveli. The temple is covered with exquisite well composed sculptures and friezes some containing comic figures. The entire cornice of the temple tower is embellished with designs of creepers and foliage. Other examples of such temples can be seen at the Vaidyanatha Temple at Tirumalavadi and the Uttara Kailasa Temple at Thanjavur.

The maturity and grandeur to which the Chola architecture had evolved found expression in the two magnificent temples of Thanjavur and Gangaikondacholapuram. The magnificent Siva temple of Thanjavur, completed around 1009 is a fitting memorial to the material achievements of the time of Rajaraja. The largest and tallest of all Indian temples, it is a masterpiece constituting the high-water mark of South Indian architecture.

It is in this temple that one notices for the first time two gopuras (gateway towers, here oriented in the same direction). They are architecturally coeval with the main vimana and are referred to in inscriptions as Rajarajan tiruvasal and Keralantakan tiruvasal. In spite of the massive size of the gopuras, the vimana, rising majestically to a height of 190 feet, continues to dominate and it is only in the subsequent period that a change in the gradation of magnitude takes place.

Epigraphic evidence reveals that Rajaraja started building this temple in his 19th regnal year and it was completed on 275th day of his 25th regnal year (1010), taking only 6 years. Rajaraja named this temple as Rajarajesvaram and the deity Shiva in Linga form as Peruvudaiyar, the temple is also known in the deity's name as Peruvudaiyarkovil. In later period Maratha and Nayaks rulers constructed various shrines and gopurams of the temple. In later period when the Sanskrit language was more popular during the Maratha rule the temple was named in Sanskrit as Brihadisvaram and the deity as Brihadisvara.

This temple carries on its walls the engraved evidence of the elaborate administrative and financial procedures concerning the day-to-day administration of the temple. The inscriptions give, apart from a comprehensive history of the times, a full enumeration of all the metallic images set up in the temple. Numbering about sixty-six, these icons are referred to with a description of the minutest details of size, shape and composition. This alone is a mine of information for the art historian.

The temple stands within a fort, whose walls are later additions built in the 16th century by the Nayaks of Tanjore. The towering vimanam is about 200 feet in height and is referred to as Dakshina Meru (Southern Mountain). The octagonal Shikharam (crest) rests on a single block of granite weighing 81 tons. It is believed that this block was carried up a specially built ramp built from a site 6 kilometres away from the temple. Huge Nandis (figures of the sacred bull) dot the corners of the Shikharam, and the Kalasam on top by itself is about 3.8 metres in height. Hundreds of stucco figures bejewel the Vimanam, although it is possible that some of these may have been added on during the Maratha period. The main deity is a lingam and is a huge, set in a two storeyed sanctum, and the walls surrounding the sanctum delight visitors as a storehouse of murals and sculptures. The temple is built entirely of granite in a place where there is no source of granite.

Though the temple of Gangaikonda Cholapuram follows the plan of the great temple of Thanjavur in most details it has characteristics of its own. From the remains it may be seen that it had only one enclosure wall and a gopura while the Thanjavur temple has two gopuras and enclosures. It is larger in plan though not as tall, the vimana being 100 feet square at the base and 186 feet high. The temple, which forms a large rectangle 340 feet long and 110 feet wide occupies the middle of an immense walled enclosure mainly built for defensive purposes. The vimana has the same construction as in Thanjavur, but the number of tiers making up the pyramidal body is only eight as against 13 in Thanjavur. The most important difference lies in the introduction of curves in the place of the strong straight lines of the Thanjavur vimana. The pyramidal body is slightly concave in its outline at its angles while the sides are curved to produce a somewhat convex outline. These curves enhance the beauty of form of the vimana though they distract from its stateliness and power.

== Later Period ==
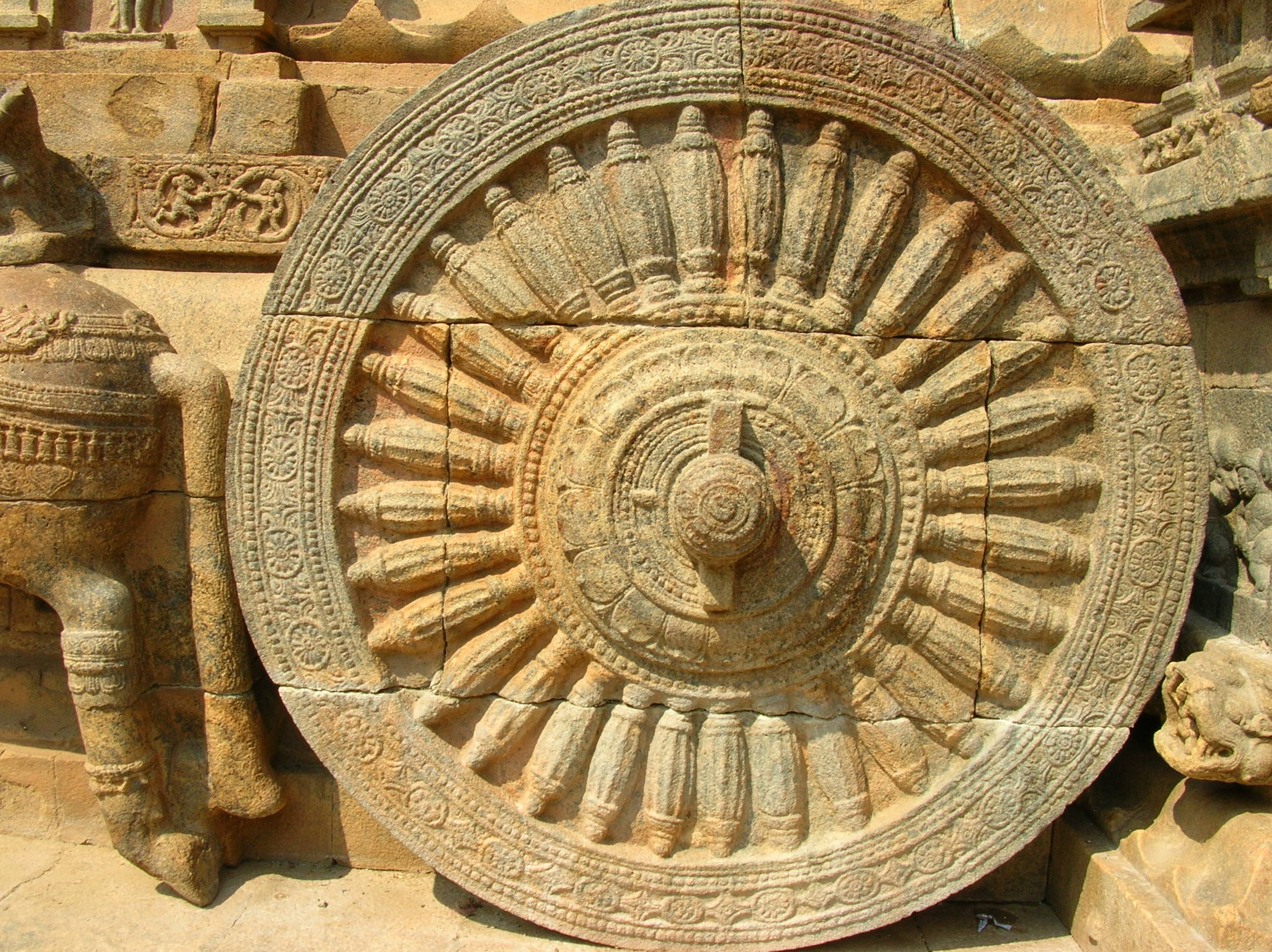
Spoked chariot wheel, Airavateswarar Temple, Darasuram c. 1200 C.E.

The Chola style continued to flourish for a century longer and expressed itself in a very large number of temples. Of these two large temples are worthy of comparison to those of Rajaraja and Rajendra.

The Airavateswara temple at Darasuram near Thanjavur built during the reign of Rajaraja II is a magnificent structure typical of the stage of architectural development reached in the 12th century CE. This temple has artistic stone pillars and decorations on its walls, in a style bordering on mannerism, with an emphasis on elongated limbs and polished features. Best among them are the dark black basalt figures in the temple niches of Dakshinamurti, the image on the southern side of Shiva in a teaching attitude, and to the west, Shiva erupting out of the pillar of light to convince Brahma and Vishnu of his superiority. The front mandapam is in the form of a huge chariot drawn by horses.

The final example of this period is the Kampaheswarar temple at Tribhuvanam near Kumbakonam which has survived in good repair as built by Kulothunga III. The architecture of this temple is similar to the temples at Tanjore, Gangaikondacholapuram and Darasuram.

== Sculpture and bronzes ==
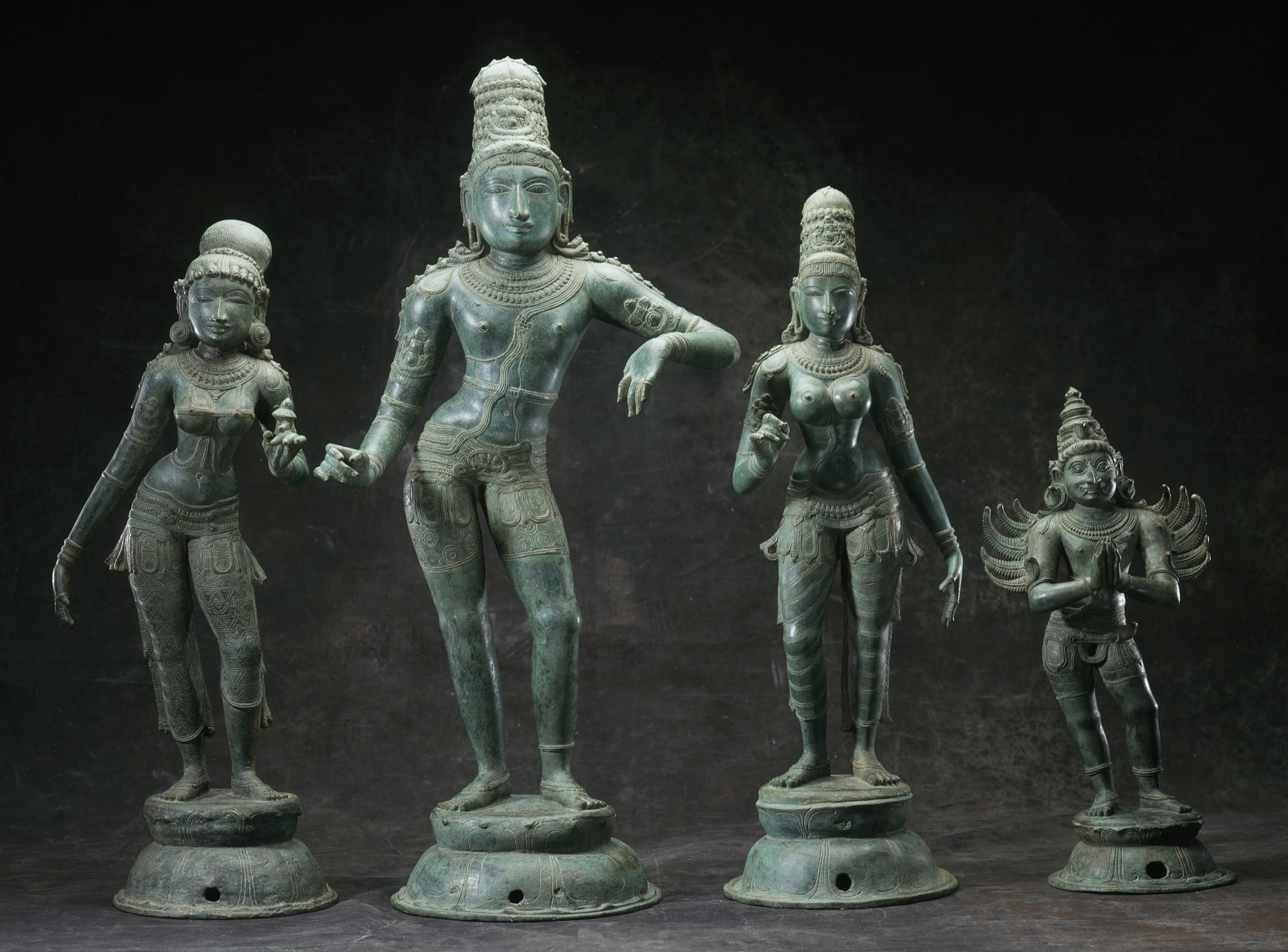
Krishna with his consorts Rukmini and Satyabhama and his mount Garuda, Tamil Nadu, India, late 11th–12th century

The Chola period is also remarkable for its sculptures and bronzes. Among the existing specimens in the various museums of the world and in the temples of South India, may be seen many fine figures of Siva in various forms accompanied by his consort Parvati and the other gods, demigods and goddesses of the Saivaite pantheon, Vishnu and his consort Lakshmi, the Nayanmars, other Saiva saints and many more. Though conforming generally to the iconographic conventions established by long tradition, the sculptor could also exercise his imagination within the boundaries of the canonical Hindu iconography and worked in greater freedom during the eleventh and the twelfth centuries. As a result, the sculptures and bronzes show classic grace, grandeur and taste. The best example of this can be seen in the form of Nataraja, the Divine Dancer.

=== Purpose of the Icons ===
While the stone sculpture and the inner sanctum image empowering the temple remained immovable, changing religious concepts during the period around the 10th century demanded that the deities take part in a variety of public roles similar to those of a human monarch. As a result, large bronze images were created to be carried outside the temple to participate in daily rituals, processions, and temple festivals. The round lugs and holes found on the bases of many of these sculptures are for the poles that were used to carry the heavy images. The deities in bronze who participated in such festivities were sumptuously clothed and decorated with precious jewellery. Their every need and comfort were catered to by a battery of temple priests, musicians, cooks, devadasis, administrators and patrons. The lay public thronged the processional route to have a darshan and admired their beloved deity for the lavish depiction of the figure and the grand costumes and jewelry.

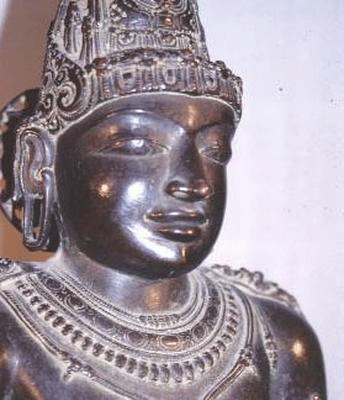
Detail of a Statue of Rajaraja Chola I at the Brihadisvara Temple

Although bronze casting has a long history in south India, a much larger and a much greater number of bronze sculptures in all sizes ranging from massive to miniature were cast during the Chola period than before, further attesting to the importance of bronze sculpture during this period. When in worship, these images are bedecked in silk costumes, garlands, and gem encrusted jewels, befitting the particular avatar and religious context. Decorating temple bronzes in this way is a tradition at least a thousand years old and such decorations are referred to in 10th-century Chola inscriptions.

In recent times, many of these priceless Chola bronzes have been stolen from their temples or museums, smuggled out of India and have found their way into the private museums of art collectors.

=== Lost wax technique ===
Chola period bronzes were created using the lost wax technique. It is known in artistic terms as "Cire Perdue". The Sanskrit Shilpa texts call it the Madhu Uchchishtta Vidhana.

Beeswax and kungilium (a type of camphor) are mixed with a little oil and kneaded well. The figure is sculpted from this mixture fashioning all the minute details. This is the original wax model.

The entire figure is then coated with clay made from termite hills until the mould is of a necessary thickness. Then the whole thing is dried and fired in an oven with cow-dung cakes. The wax model melts and flows out, while some of it vapourises.

The metal alloy of bronze is melted and poured into the empty clay-mould. This particular bronze alloy is known as Pancha Loham. When the metal has filled all crevices and has settled and hardened and cooled, the mould is broken off. The bronze figure thus obtained is then cleaned, finer details are added, blemishes are removed, smoothened, and polished well. Hence each bronze icon is unique and the mould cannot be used to create copies.

=== Style ===
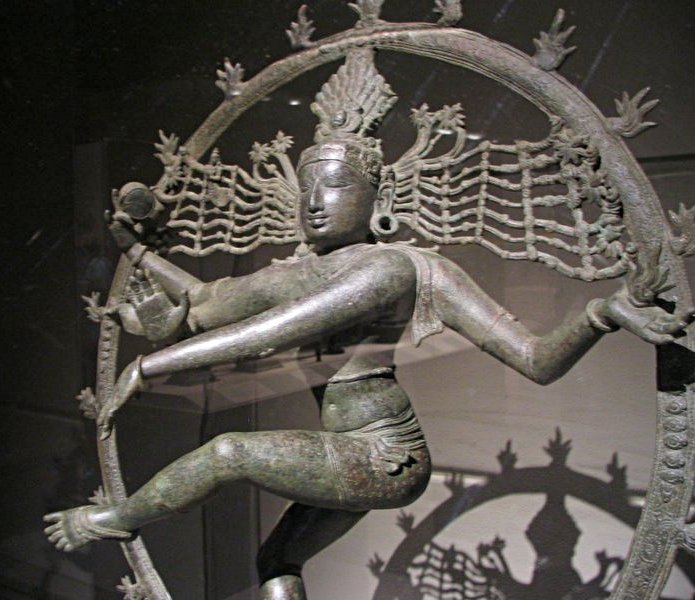
Bronze Chola Statue of Nataraja at the Metropolitan Museum of Art, New York City

Chola bronzes have little intricate ornamentation in comparison with the subsequent bronzes of the Vijayanagar and Nayaka period. By means of the facial expressions, the gestures or mudras the overall body posture and other accompanying bronzes we can imagine the surroundings and the religious context of the figure of the god or goddess; what instrument or weapon he or she is holding; what he or she is leaning on; and what he or she is doing or about to do.

For example, in the Rishabaandhika or the Vrishabavahana murthy pose, we see Shiva standing with one leg youthfully crossed across the other and his arm elegantly flexed and raised as if resting or leaning on something. In this elegant posture, it can be surmised that the youthful and athletic Shiva is leaning on his bull-vahana, Nandhi, on whose shoulders He is resting His arm.

The most famous of all the bronze icons is that of Nataraja or Adavallar. The symbolism presents Shiva as lord of the cosmic dance of creation and destruction. He is active, yet aloof, like the gods on the Parthenon Frieze. Surrounding Shiva, a circle of flames represents the universe, whose fire is held in Shiva's left rear palm. His left front arm crosses his chest, the hand pointing in "elephant trunk" position (gaja hasta) to his upraised left foot, which signifies liberation. His right foot tramples the dwarf Apasmara, who represents ignorance.

Shiva's right front hand is raised in the "fear-not" gesture of benediction (abhaya mudra), while his right rear hand holds a drum with which he beats the measure of the dance. The snake, an emblem of Siva, curls around his arm. His hair holds the crescent moon - another emblem - and a small image of Ganges, the river-goddess whose precipitous fall from heaven to earth is broken by Siva's matted locks. Shiva as Nataraja or Adavallar is also accompanied by his consort Sivakami.

== Museum holdings ==
Notable collections of the bronzes are held by the museum inside the Thanjavur Maratha Palace, the Government Museum, Chennai, Pondicherry Museum, and Indian Museum, Kolkata. Outside India, Chola bronze sculptures are owned by the British Museum, New York's Metropolitan Museum of Art, the Norton Simon Museum, in Pasadena, the Asian Art Museum in San Francisco and Rijksmuseum in Amsterdam.

== Chola frescoes ==
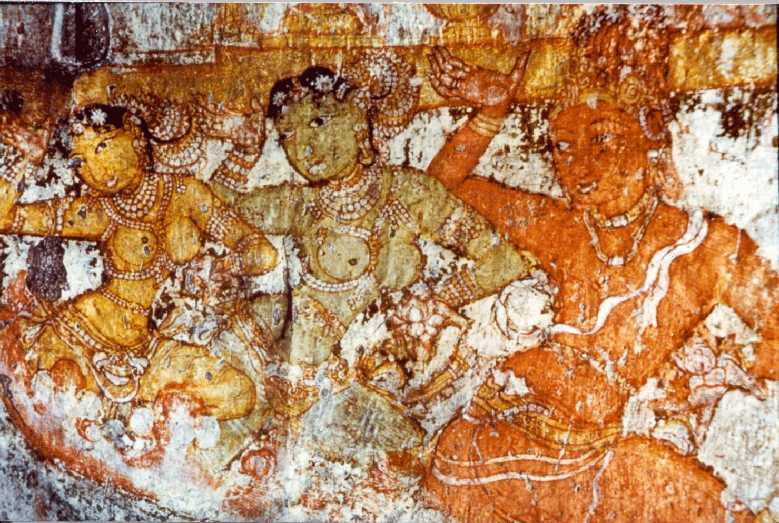
Chola Fresco of Dancing girls. Brihadisvara Temple c. 1100 C.E.

In 1931, Chola frescoes were discovered within the circumambulatory corridor of the Brihadisvara Temple, by S.K. Govindasamy, a professor at the Annamalai University. These are the first Chola paintings discovered. The passage of the corridor is dark and the walls on either side are covered with two layers of paintings from floor to ceiling.

Researchers have discovered the technique used in these frescoes. A smooth batter of limestone mixture is applied over the stones, which took two to three days to set. Within that short span, such large paintings were painted with natural organic pigments.

During the Nayak period, the Chola paintings were painted over. The Chola frescos lying underneath have an ardent spirit of saivism expressed in them. They probably synchronised with the completion of the temple by Rajaraja Chola.

== Other crafts ==
The art of making ornaments of gold and precious stones had reached an advanced stage about the beginning of the 11th century. A large number of ornaments are mentioned in the Thanjavur inscriptions.
