= Mannadipet firka =

Coordinates: 11°59′0.57″N 79°37′22.74″E

Mannadipet is one of the 4 Firkas of Villianur taluk in Pondicherry (North) Revenue Sub-division of the Indian union territory of Puducherry.

== Revenue villages ==
The following are the revenue villages under Mannadipet Firka

- Chettipet
- Kalithirthalkuppam
- Kunichampet
- Madagadipet
- Manalipet
- Mannadipet
- Sanyasikuppam
- Thirubuvanai
- Thiruvandarkoil
- Vadhanur

== See also ==
- Kodathur firka
- Thondamanatham firka
- Villianur firka
