= Thirukkanur =

Thirukkanur Tiroucanour
- village
- Location in Puducherry, India
- Coordinates: 11°59′31″N 79°38′23″E
- Country: India
- State: Puducherry
- District: Pondicherry
- Taluk: Villianur
- Commune Panchayat: Mannadipet

Languages
  - Official: French, Tamil, English
- Time zone: UTC+5:30 (IST)
- Vehicle registration: PY-05

Thirukkanur is a village in the union territory of Puducherry, India. It is one of 16 villages located in Mannadipet commune panchayat of the Villianur taluk. It is bordered by the state of Tamil Nadu both to the east and west.

Thirukkanur has a primary health center, police station, post office, electricity office and registrar office. The area is mainly oriented to agriculture. Thirukkanur market is the only bazaar catering to the needs of about 20 nearby villages. There is no major industry within the purview area of the Thirukkanar Police Station.

== Thirukkanur papier-mâché dancing doll ==
Dancing dolls made in this village are famous for their design. Thirukkanur papier-mâché craft has been conferred with the Geographical Indication (GI) status by the Government of India in 2010 with GI Number 155.
