= Kodathur firka =

Coordinates: 11°59′29.59″N 79°39′56.31″E

Kodathur is one of the 4 Firkas of Villianur taluk in Pondicherry (North) Revenue Sub-division of the Indian union territory of Puducherry.

== Revenue villages ==
The following are the revenue villages under Kodathur Firka

- Katery
- Kodathur
- Kuppam
- Pudukuppam
- Sellipet
- Sorapet
- Suthukeny
- Thethampakkam
- Vambupet

== See also ==
- Mannadipet firka
- Thondamanatham firka
- Villianur firka
