= Vadukeeswarar temple =

Vadukeeswarar Temple
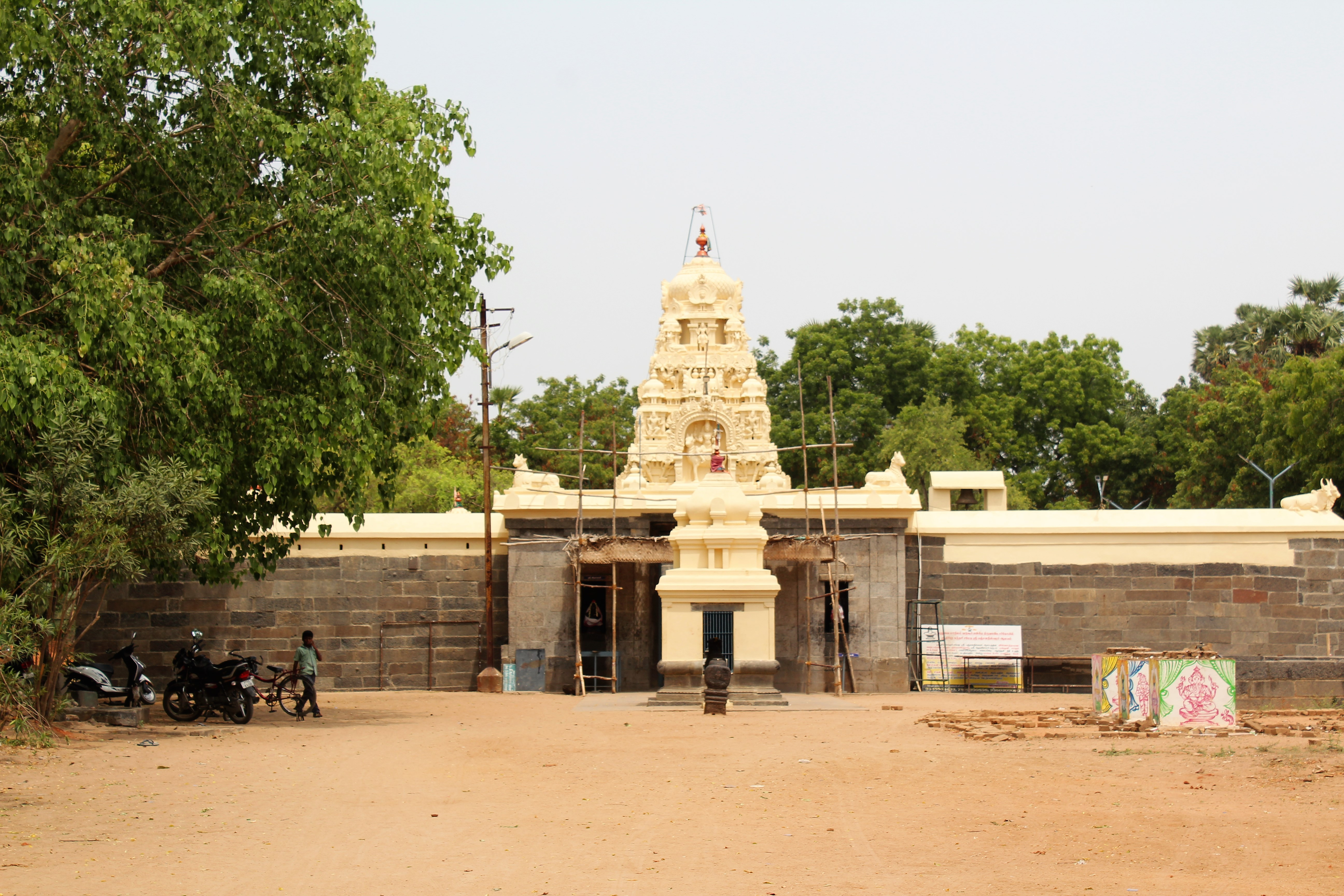

- Location in Tamil Nadu

Religion
- Affiliation: Hinduism
- Deity: Vadukeeswarar(Shiva)

Location
- State: Puducherry
- Country: India
- Coordinates: 11°55′8.7″N 79°39′26.3″E

Architecture
- Type: Dravidian architecture

Vadukeeswarar Temple (also called Thiruvandarkoil Temple, Thiruvandarkoil and Panchanadeeswarar temple) is a Hindu temple dedicated to the deity Shiva, located in Thiruvandarkoil , a village in Pondicherry - Villupuram highway in Pondicherry in the South Indian state of Tamil Nadu. Shiva is worshiped as Vadukeeswarar, and is represented by the lingam. His consort Parvati is depicted as Thiripura Sundari. The temple is located on the Chennai - Villupuram highway. The presiding deity is revered in the 7th century Tamil Saiva canonical work, the Tevaram, written by Tamil saint poets known as the nayanmars and classified as Paadal Petra Sthalam.

The temple complex covers an area of two acres and all its shrines are enclosed with concentric rectangular walls. The original complex is believed to have been built by Cholas, with later additions from different ruling dynasties. In modern times, The temple is maintained and administered by the Archaeological Survey of India as a protected monument.

== Legend and history ==
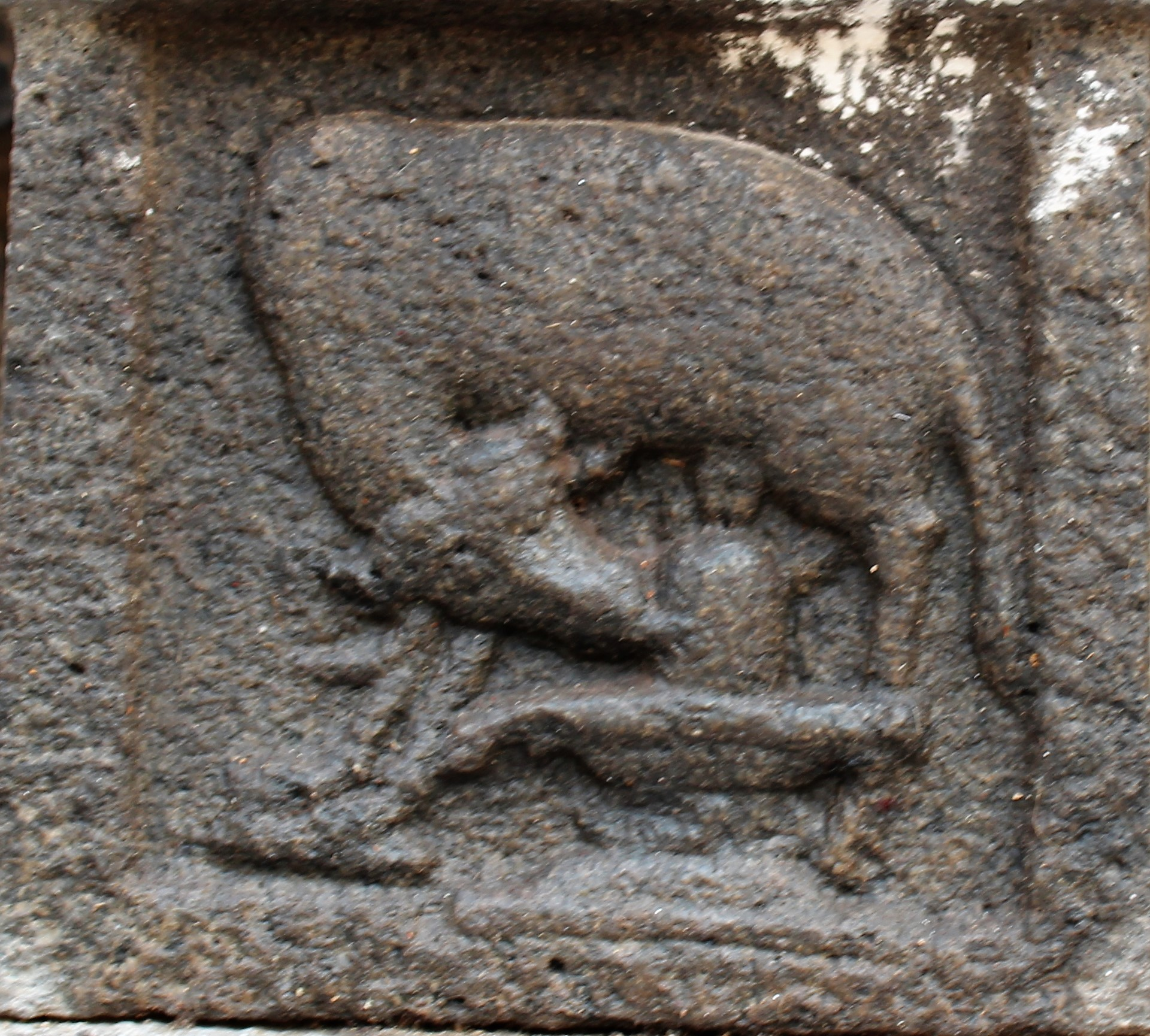
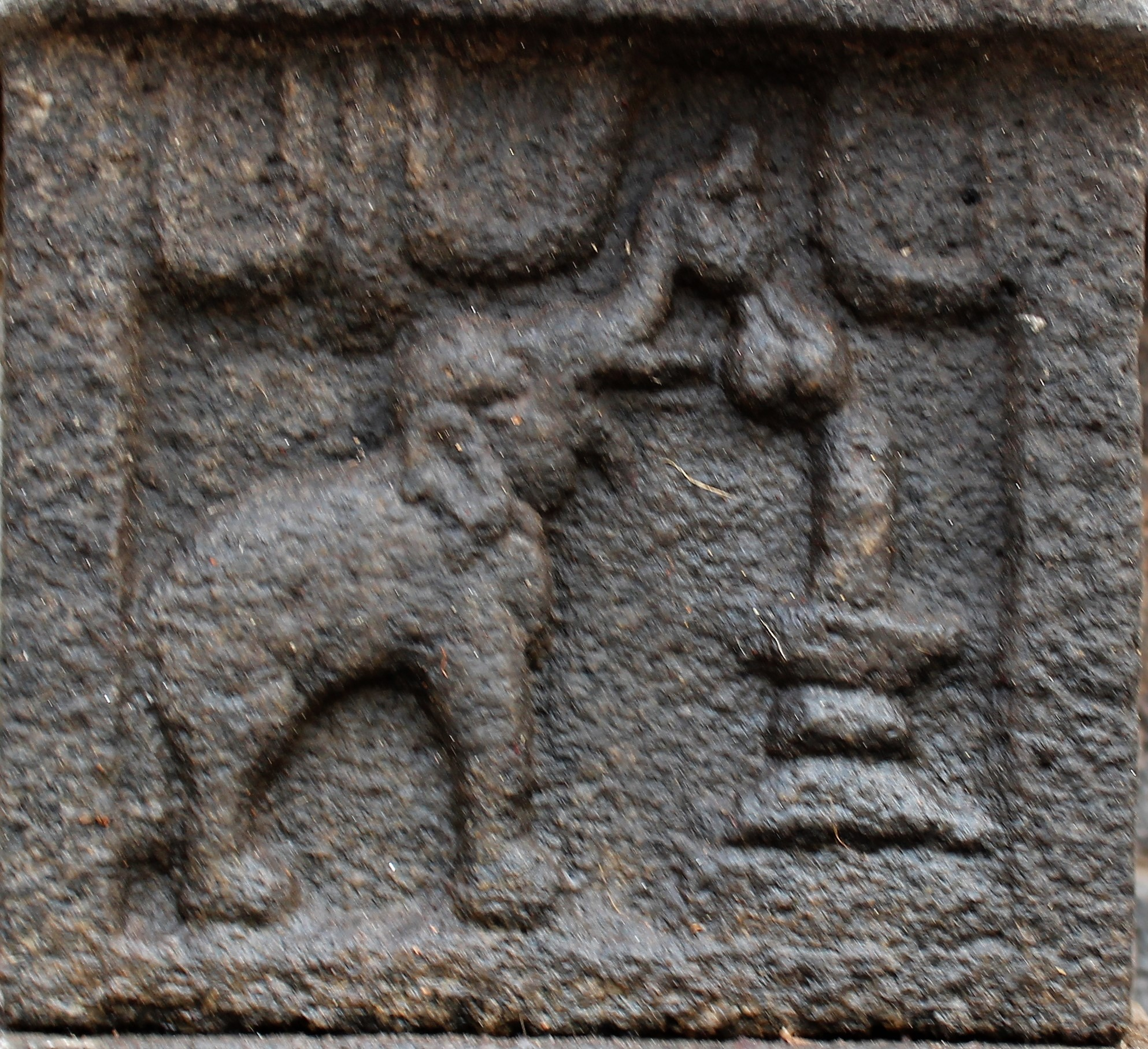
Sculpted images on the walls

As per Hindu legend, Brahma, one of the three Hindu trios, got proud of his accomplishments and power. Once Parvathi, the wife of the other trio Shiva, got confused with the five heads of Brahma thinking it to be that of Shiva's. Shiva removed one of the five heads of Brahma as a punishment. Brahma realised his mistake and pleaded with Shiva. Shiva came to be known as Vadukeeswarar as he quivered the head of Brahma.

The original structure is believed to be existent from time immemorial, while the later additions are believed to have been built by Cholas, Pallavas, while the present masonry structure was built during the 16th century. There are inscriptions from later Chola emperors like Rajaraja Chola I (985–1014), Kulothunga Chola I (1070–1120), and Rajendra Chola III (1246–1279).

== Architecture ==
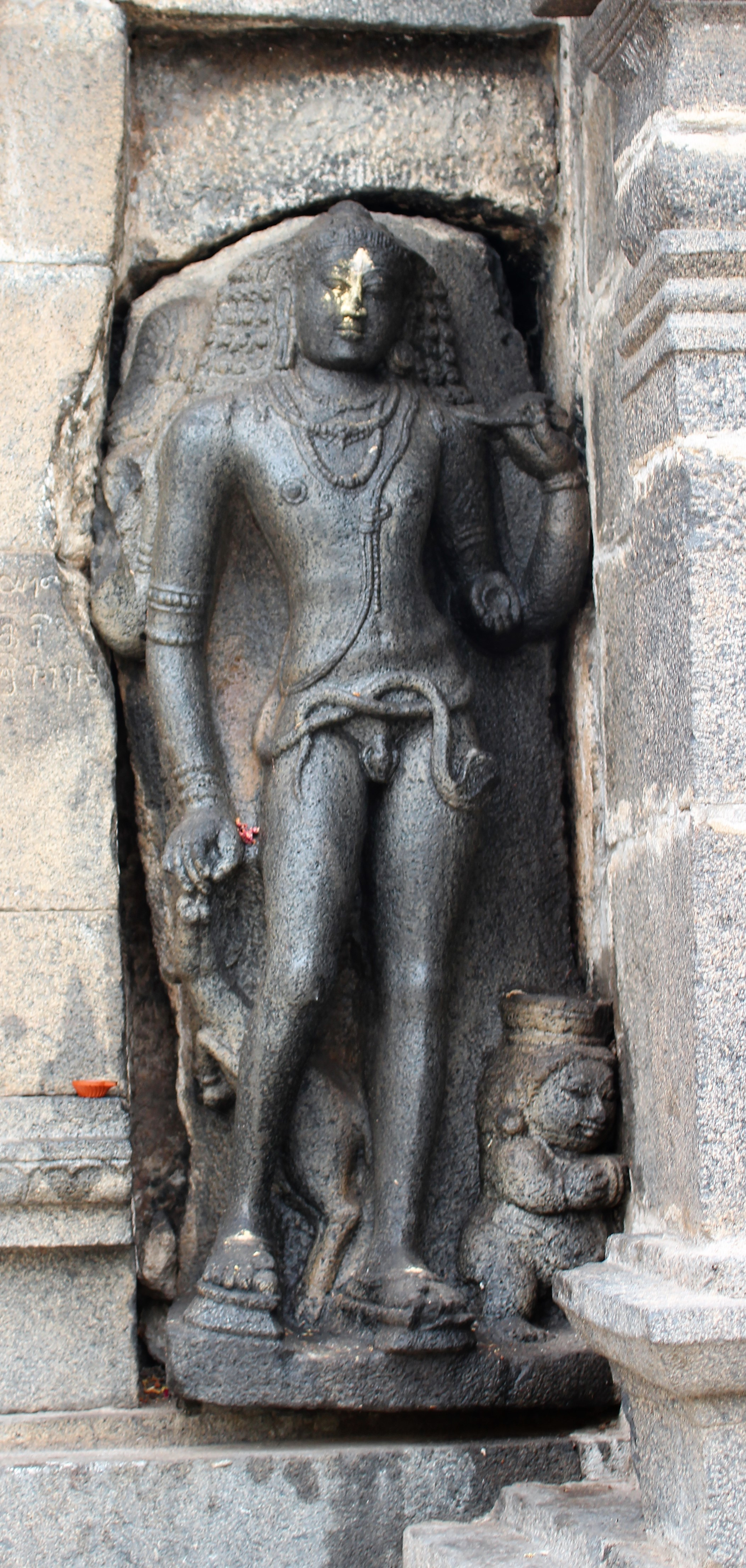
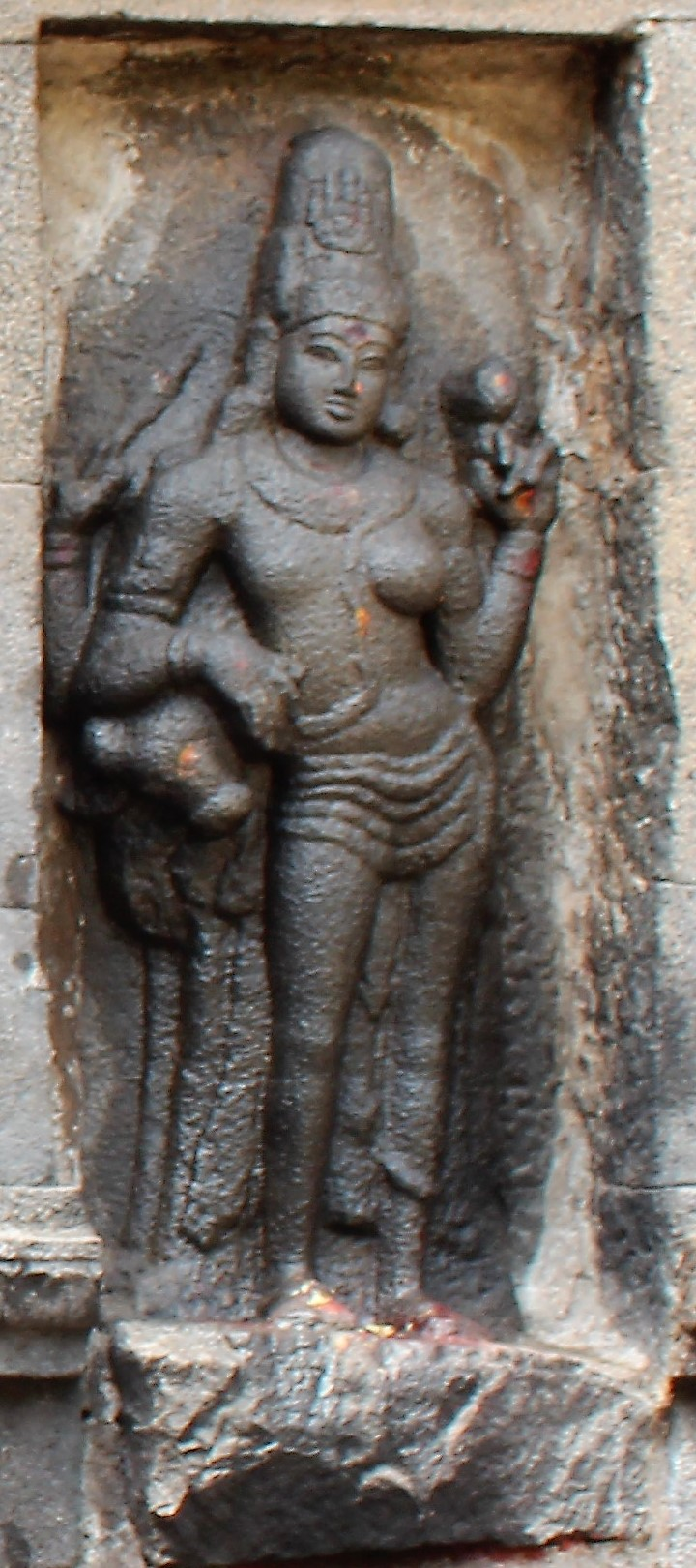
Sculpted images of Bhikshatana and Ardhanarisvara.

Vadukeeswarar temple is located in a village called Thiruvandarkoil located 21 km (13 mi) from Pondicherry on Viluppuram - Pondicherry highway. The temple has a flat entrance tower facing east, and all the shrines of the temple are enclosed in concentric rectangular granite walls. The shrine of Thripurasundari is housed in a shrine facing north in the second precinct. The central shrine housing Vadukeeswarar is approached through pillared halls. The shrine houses the image of Vadukeeswarar in the form of Lingam (an iconic form of Shiva). The central shrine is approached through a Mahamandapam and Arthamandapam. As in other Shiva temples in Tamil Nadu, the shrines of Vinayaka, Murugan, Navagraha, Chandekeswara and Durga are located around the precinct of the main shrine. The stucco images on the four sides of the vimana of the temple were plastered by Archaeological Survey around 1994.

The temple is originally believed to be built by the Cholas - Parantaka I. The inscription is dated 1048, the 30th regnal year of Rajaraja. There are inscriptions from later Chola emperors like Rajaraja Chola I (985–1014), Kulothunga Chola I (1070–1120), and Rajendra Chola III (1246–1279). The region along with the temple briefly switched hands to Pandya empire as indicated by the inscriptions in the temple.

The regions changed hands from British to French colonial Empire during the 17th century. Most temples in the place were destroyed during the French invasion, but the temple was spared.

== Religious importance and festivals ==
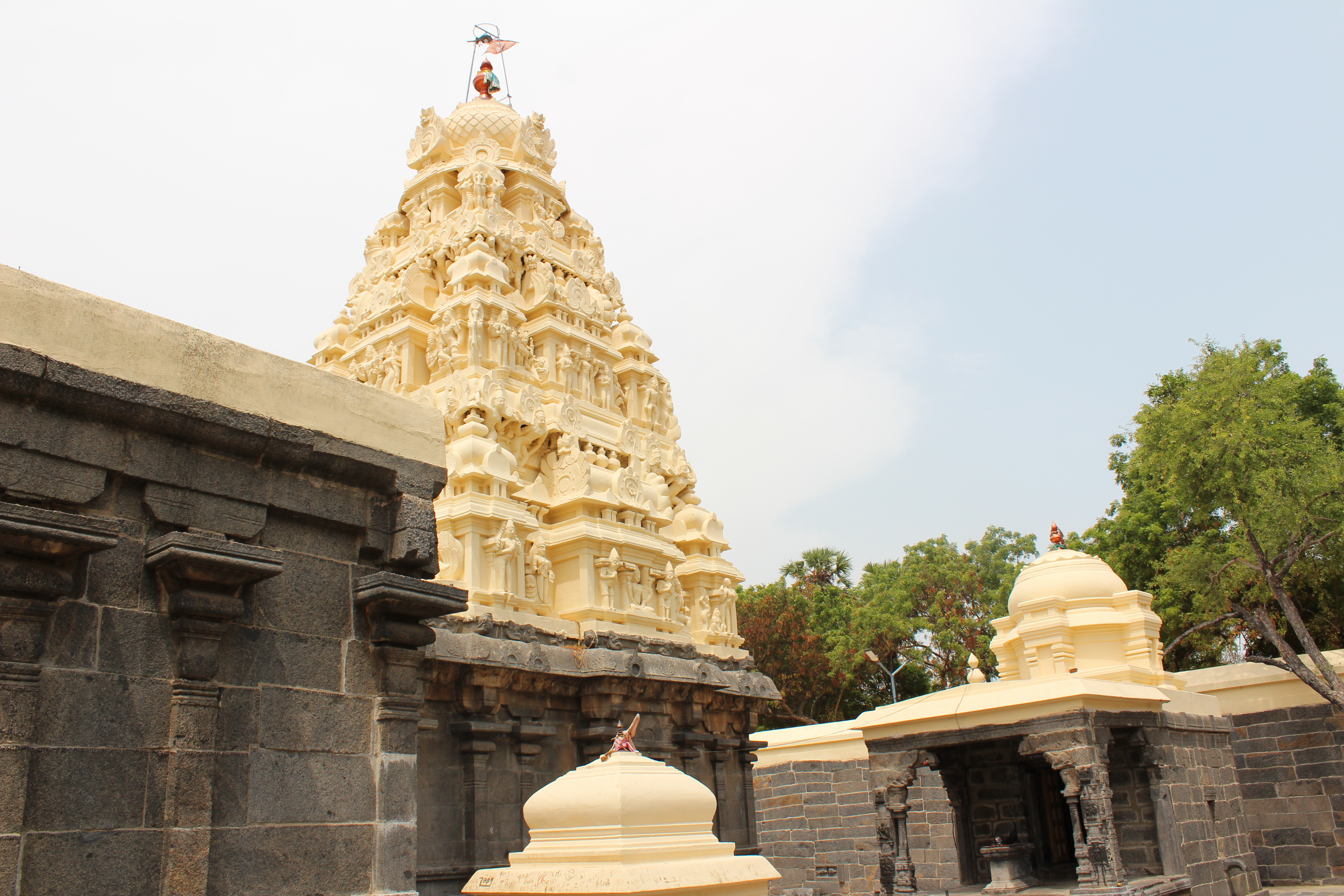
Image of the central shrine

It is one of the shrines of the 275 Paadal Petra Sthalams - Shiva Sthalams glorified in the early medieval Tevaram poems by Tamil Saivite Nayanars Thirugnana Sambandar.

The temple is maintained and administered by the Archaeological Survey of India as a protected monument.
