= Villianur firka =

Coordinates: 11°54′50.96″N 79°45′20.17″E

Villianur is one of the 4 Firkas of Villianur taluk in Pondicherry (North) Revenue Sub-division of the Indian union territory of Puducherry.

== Revenue villages ==
The following are the revenue villages under Villianur Firka

- Ariyur
- Kizhur
- Kurumbapet
- Manakuppam
- Mangalam
- Odiampet
- Perungalur
- Sathamangalam
- Thirukanji
- Uruvaiyar
- Villianur

== See also ==
- Kodathur firka
- Mannadipet firka
- Thondamanatham firka
