= Thondamanatham firka =

Coordinates: 11°57′34.58″N 79°43′37.86″E

Thondamanatham is one of the 4 Firkas of Villianur taluk in Pondicherry (North) Revenue Sub-division of the Indian union territory of Puducherry.

== Revenue villages ==
The following are the revenue villages under Thondamanatham Firka

- Koodapakkam
- Karasoor
- Olaivaikal
- Ousudu
- Ramanathaapuram
- Sedarapet
- Thondamanatham
- Thuthipet

== See also ==
- Kodathur firka
- Mannadipet firka
- Villianur firka
