= Mannadipattu commune =

Coordinates: 11°59′6.35″N 79°37′23.33″E

Mannadipattu Commune is located in India. Originally it was called "Tribuvane Commune", then renamed "Mannadipet Commune" (after liberation, by the Temporary United Government on 12 April 1954 in Tirubuvane). The liberation occurred while French India Government ruled over the French occupied Pondicherry regions. This event was a vital cause for liberation of entire French occupied Puducherry from French Administration.

== Panchayat villages ==
The following are 16 panchayat villages under Mannadipattu Commune.

- Chettipet
- Kalitheerthal Kuppam
- Katteri Kuppam
- Kodathur
- Kunichempet
- Madagadipet
- Mannadipattu
- Sandai Pudukuppam
- Saniyasi Kuppam
- Sellipattu
- Sorapattu
- Suthukeni
- Thirubuvanai
- Thirukkanur
- Thiruvandar Koil
- Puranasinga Palayam
