= Thirubuvanai =

Thirubuvanai Tiroubouvané
- village
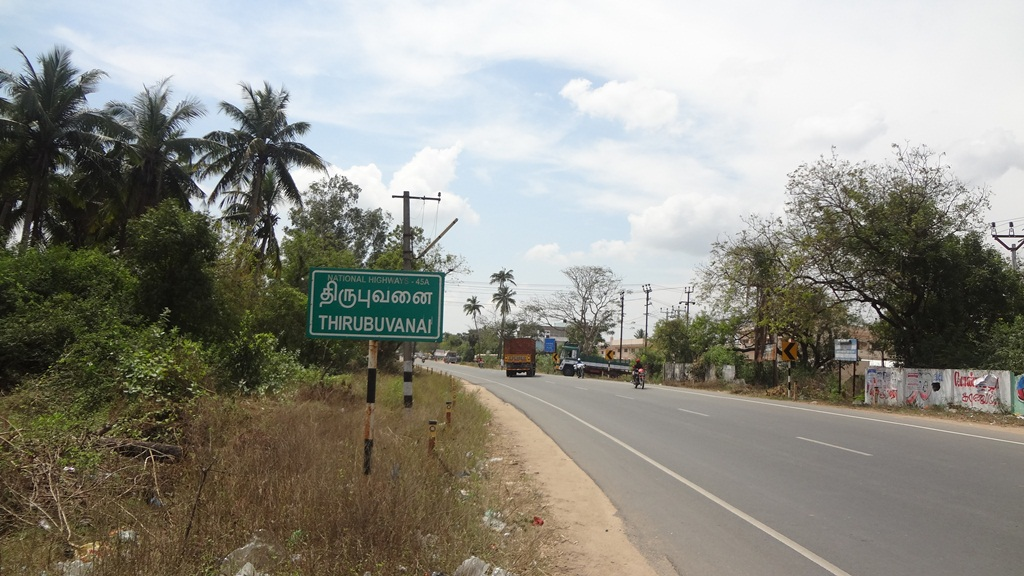

- Location in Puducherry, India Thirubuvanai (India)
- Coordinates: 11.928136°N 79.644849°E
- Country: India
- State: Puducherry
- District: Pondicherry
- Taluk: Villianur
- Commune Panchayat: Mannadipet

Area
  - Total: 3.28 km^{2} (1.27 sq mi)

Population (2011)
  - Total: 9,374
  - Density: 2,860/km^{2} (7,400/sq mi)

Languages
  - Official: French, Tamil, English
- Time zone: UTC+5:30 (IST)
- PIN: 605107
- Telephone code: +91–0413(STD Code)
- Vehicle registration: PY-05
- Sex ratio: 1009 ♂/♀
- Literacy: 82%

Thirubuvanai is a village in the union territory of Puducherry, India. It is located in Mannadipet commune panchayat of the Villianur taluk. It serves as the centre of Thirubuvanai (Union Territory Assembly constituency). It also hosts a Dodadrinath temple(Sri Thenkalai Varadharaja Perumal Temple)built by Parantaka-1 in the 10th century and Vadukeeswarar temple. It also has a primary health centre, police station and fire station.

== Sri Thenkalai Varadharaja Perumal Temple ==
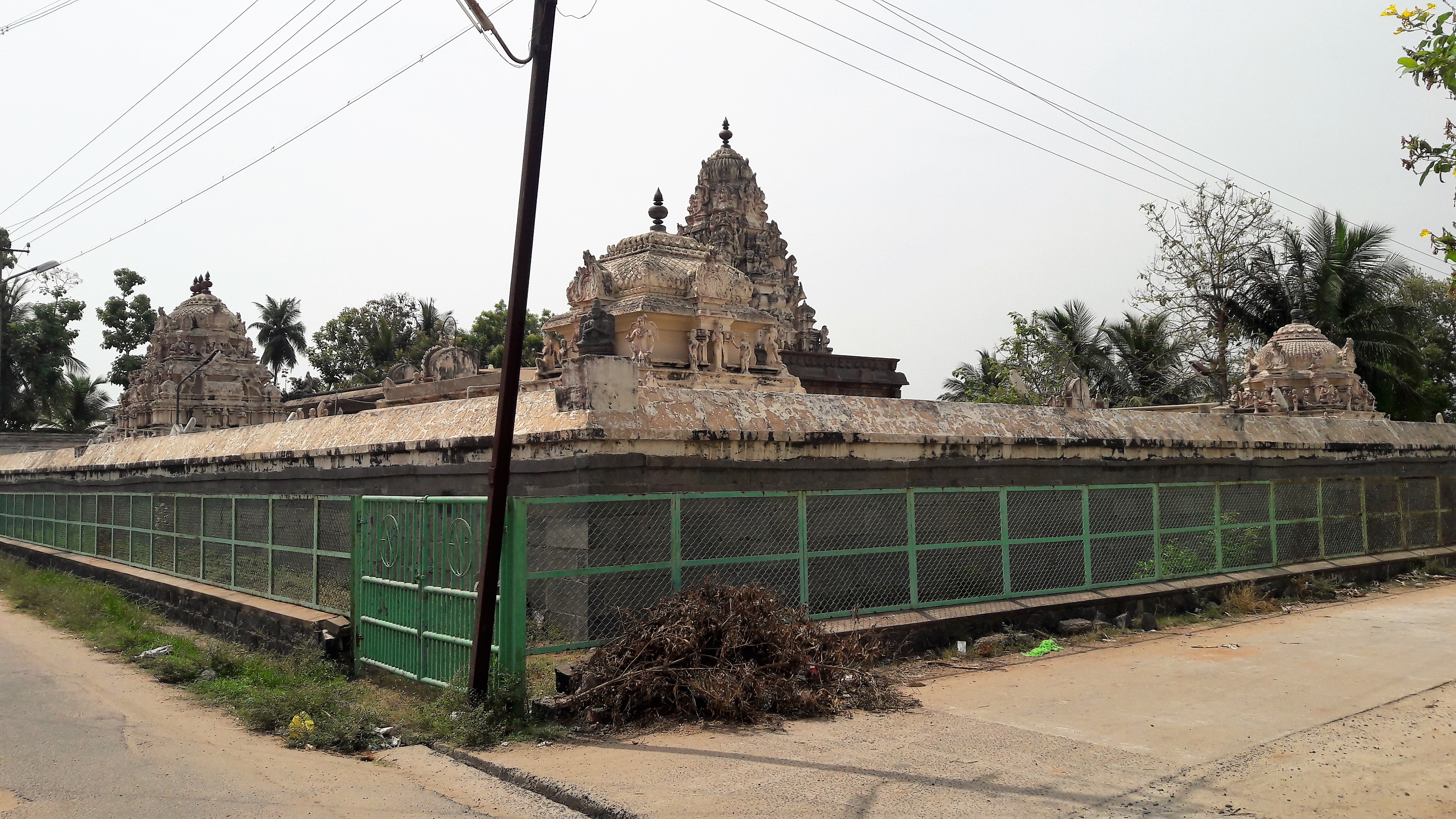
Entrance of Varadaraja perumal temple

The antiquity of the village goes back to the times of Chola king Parantaka I (907-955 CE) who built the Varadharaja Perumal temple. It was called as Veeranarayana Vinnagaram after the title of Parantaka I. The old name of the village was Tirubuvanai Mahadevi Chadurvedi Mangalam, named after the Paranthagar's Queen. The lake of this village was called Kokkilanadi-Pereri, named after another wife of Parantaka I. This is an AEL stone temple displaying the characteristic plinth mouldings, niches and pilasters. There are small but interesting panels around the sanctum depicting scenes from Ramayana and Bhagavata. There are a number of Chola inscriptions in this temple throwing light on the political, social and cultural life of the village. The temple is managed by ASI.

== Thirubuvanai Police Station ==
The police station situated at a distance of 22 km from Headquarters lies on the Villupuram Main Road (NH 45A). It is the west border police station in the Union Territory of Pondicherry. The building was inaugurated by His Excellency H.L Khurana, Governor of Tamil Nadu and Administrator of Pondicherry on 2 June 1984. The police station building contains one S.I Quarter, three H.C’s Quarters and thirteen P.C’s Quarters.

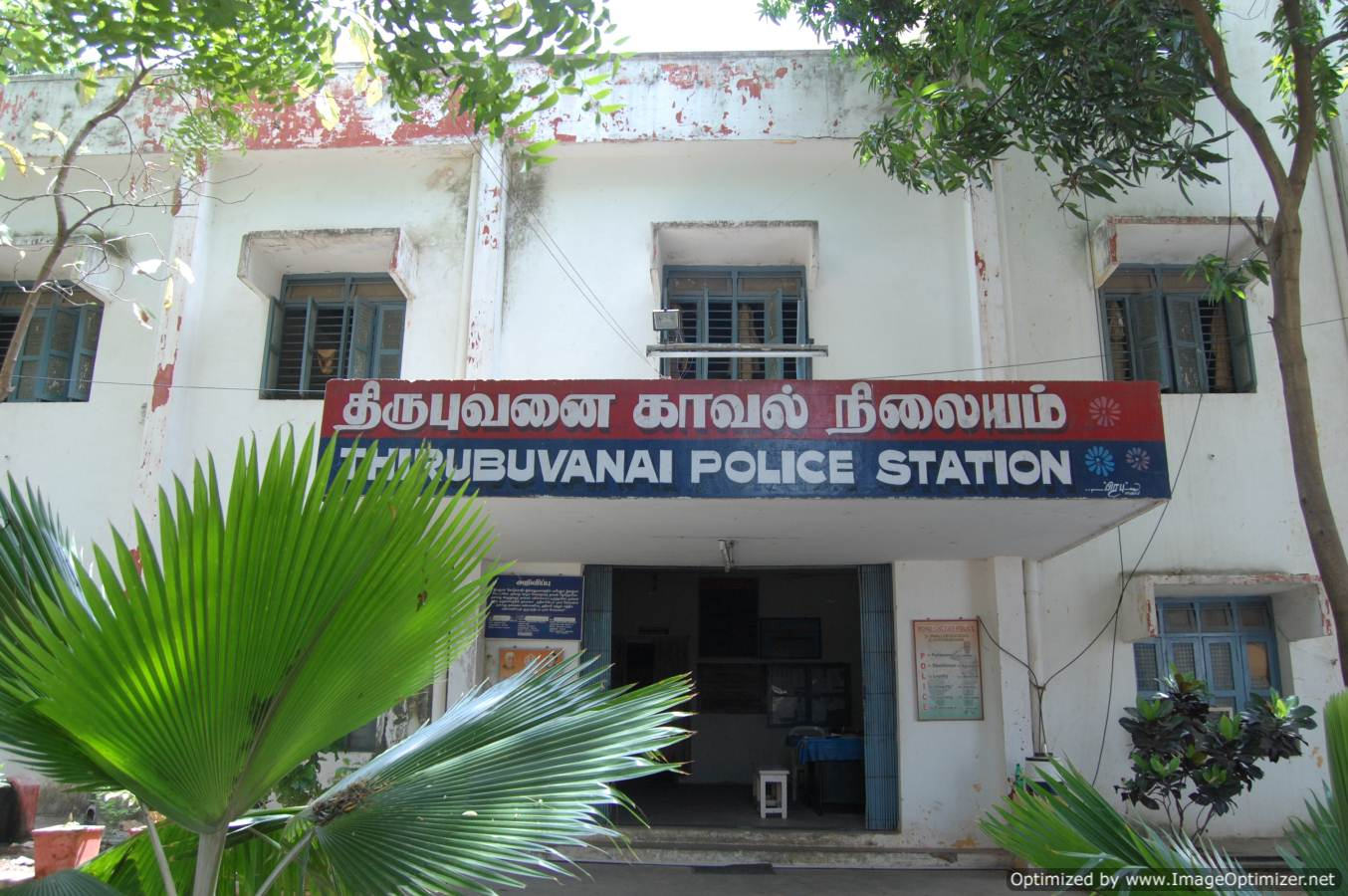
Thirubuvanai Police Station

== Schools ==
- Govt. High School Thirubuvanai (அரசு உயர் நிலை பள்ளி, திருபுவனை) was Established in 1929. The School is managed by Government of Pondicherry Education Department.
- FSDA English Higher Secondary School
- Swami Vivekananda Higher Secondary School
- Kalaimagal English High School Thirubuvanai

== Transport ==
=== Road ===
Thirubuvanai is situated in the midway of the Pondicherry to Villupuram NH45 road. There are several private buses running on daily basis from Thirubuvanai to Pondicherry. The Pondicherry Road Transport Corporation and The Tamil Nadu State Transport Corporation operates bus services from Pondicherry to Villupuram via Thirubuvanai.

=== Train ===
There is no train service available to Thirubuvanai. But one can reach ChinnababuSamuthiram railway station, and or Villupuram railway station which are located around 4 kilometer towards East and 17 km towards west from Thirubuvanai. Daily train services are available from Pondicherry to Villupuram junction via Chinnababu Samuthiram railway station.

== Festivals ==
- Sedal Festival(செடல் திருவிழா) at Sri Pazhandi Mariyamman Kovil
- Opening the door of paradise(சொர்க வாசல் திறப்பு) at Sri Thenkalai Varadharaja Perumal Kovil

== Industries ==
Sl.No	Industry Name	Product
1.	Whirlpool India limited	Washing Machine
2.	SPINCO	Cotton Mill
3.	Rusch AVT Limited	Foley cerborter
4.	Auro food limited	Refined Oil
5.	Cheslint textiles	Spinning cotton
6.	New India Palmers	Biscuits
7.	Brite Brother Ltd	Fiber Plastics
8.	Rane (Madras) Ltd	Steering for Car
9.	Pondy Devi Oil Industry	Oil Refinery Plant
10.	ACYL	Gas Cylinder
11.	POAL	Gas Manufacturing
12.	Ana Bond Essex	Vaseline Cream
13.	Micro Labs	Medicines
14.	J R Food Ltd	Oil Refined
15.	Rebazer Medi plastics	Syringe
16.	Marico	Coconut Oil

== Member of Legislative Assembly ==
- 1974: A. Gopal, Indian National Congress
- 1977: M. Maniyam, All India Anna Dravida Munnetra Kazhagam
- 1980: P. Cattavarayane, Indian National Congress (I)
- 1985: S. Komala, Dravida Munnetra Kazhagam
- 1990: D. Viswanathan, All India Anna Dravida Munnetra Kazhagam
- 1991: D. Viswanathan, All India Anna Dravida Munnetra Kazhagam
- 1996: S. Arasi, All India Anna Dravida Munnetra Kazhagam
- 2001: P. Angalan, Indian National Congress
- 2006: Angalane, Indian National Congress
- 2011: P. Angalane, All India N.R. Congress
- 2016: B. Kobiga, All India N.R. Congress

== Gallery ==
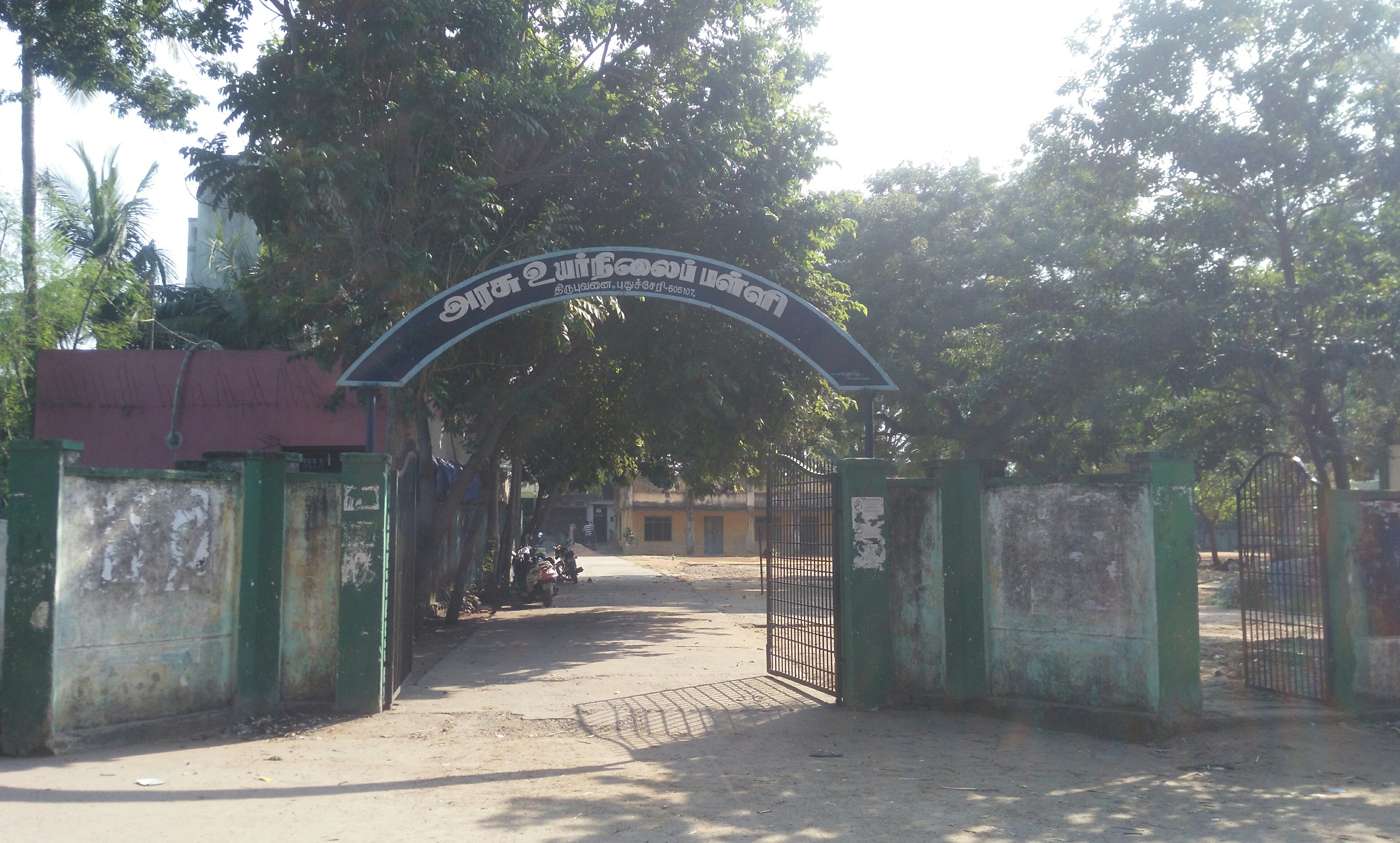
Government High School thirubuvanai New Entrance

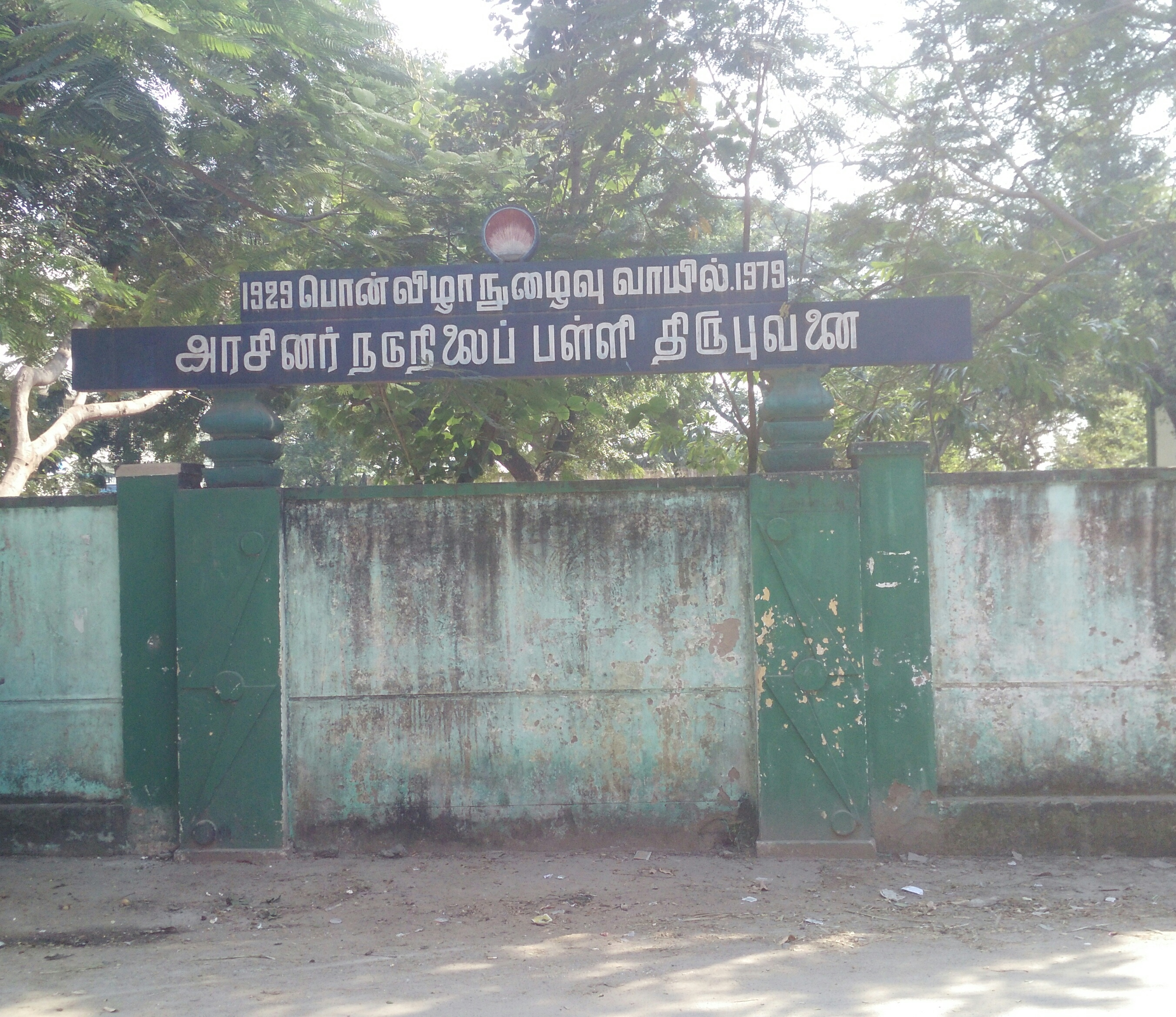
Government High School thirubuvanai old Entrance

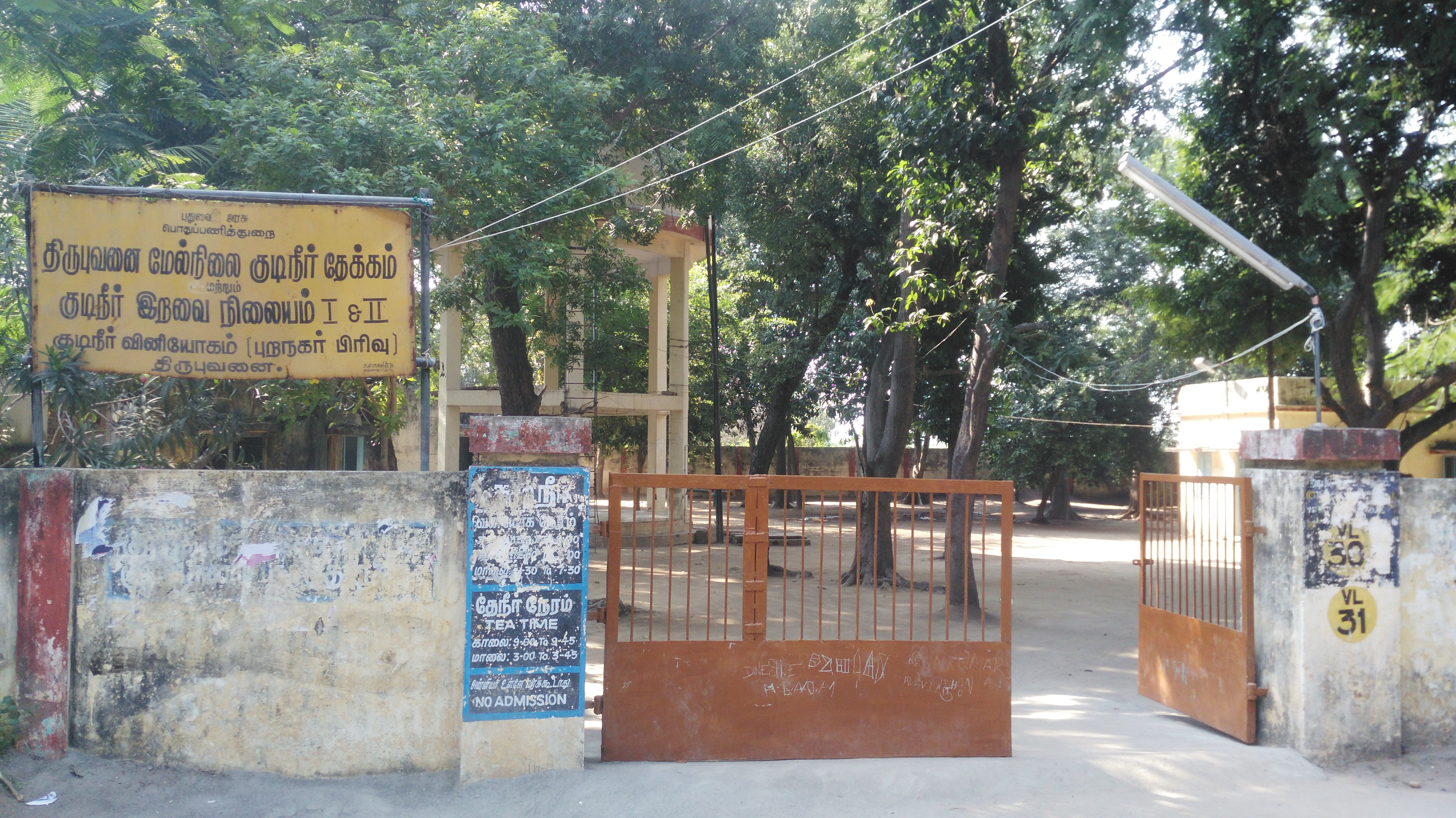
Thirubuvanai Water Tank

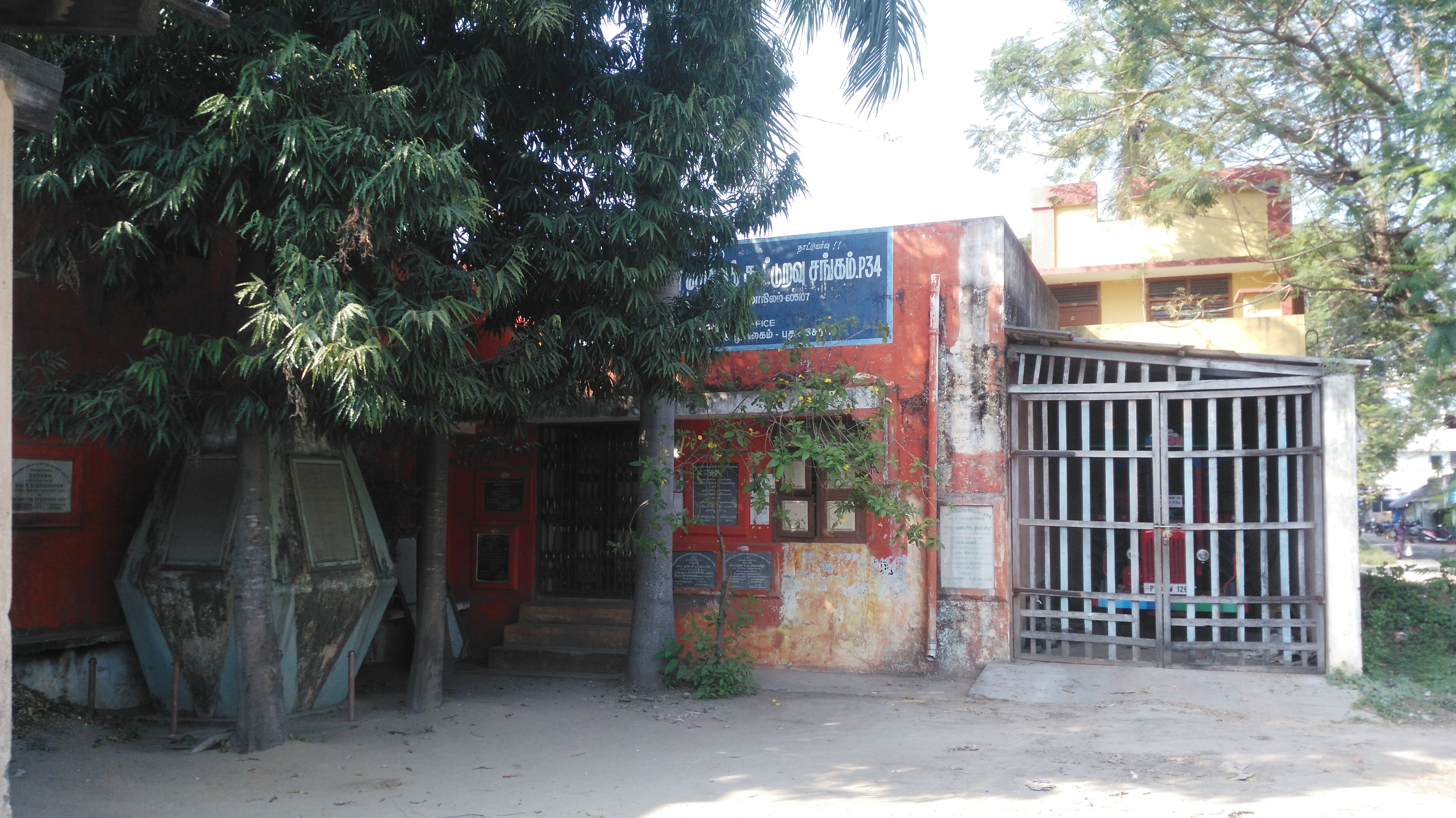
Pondicherry Formers Co-Operative Society, Thirubuvanai

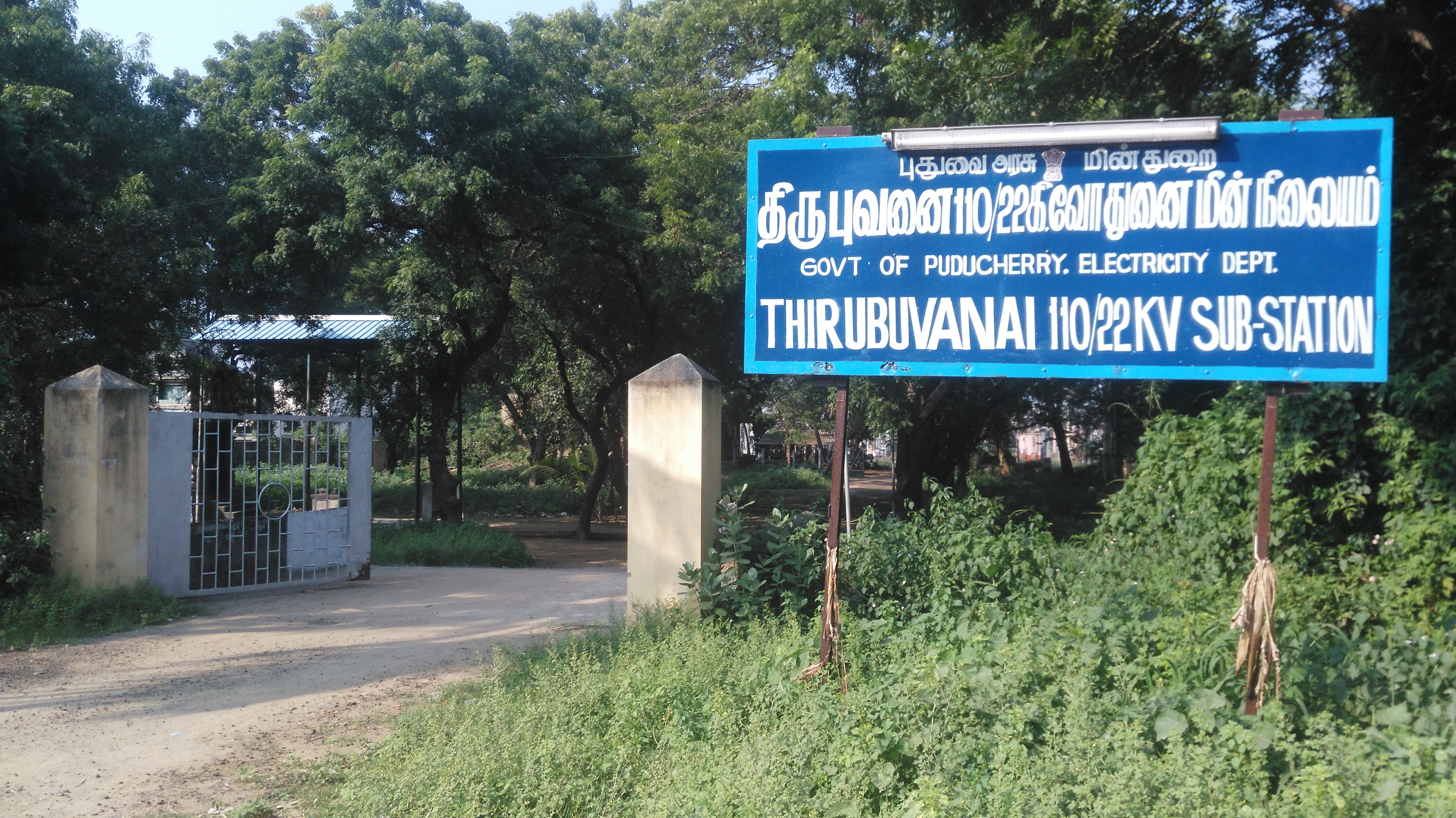
Thirubuvanai Electricity Sub Station

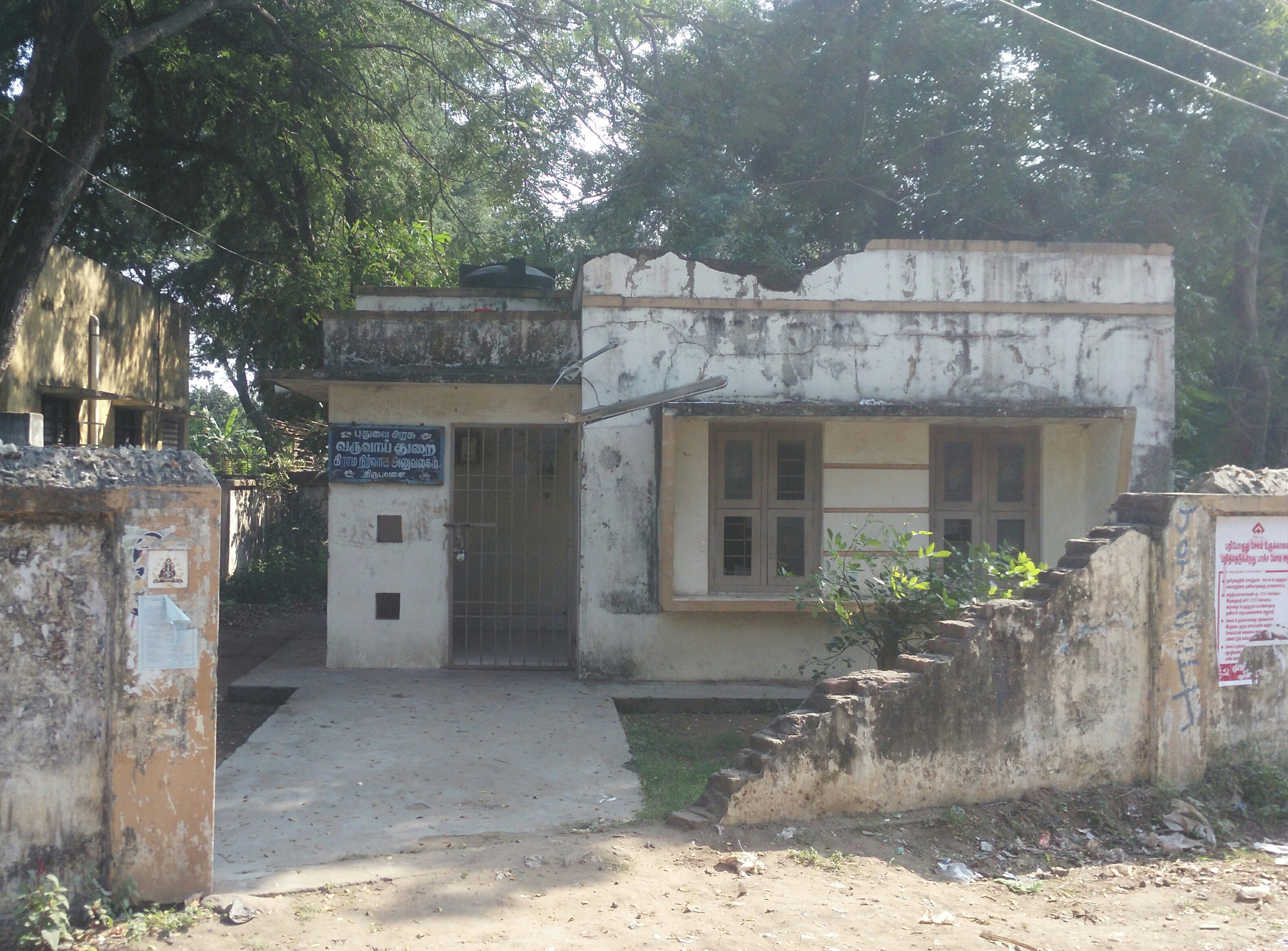
Thirubuvanai Village Administrator Office

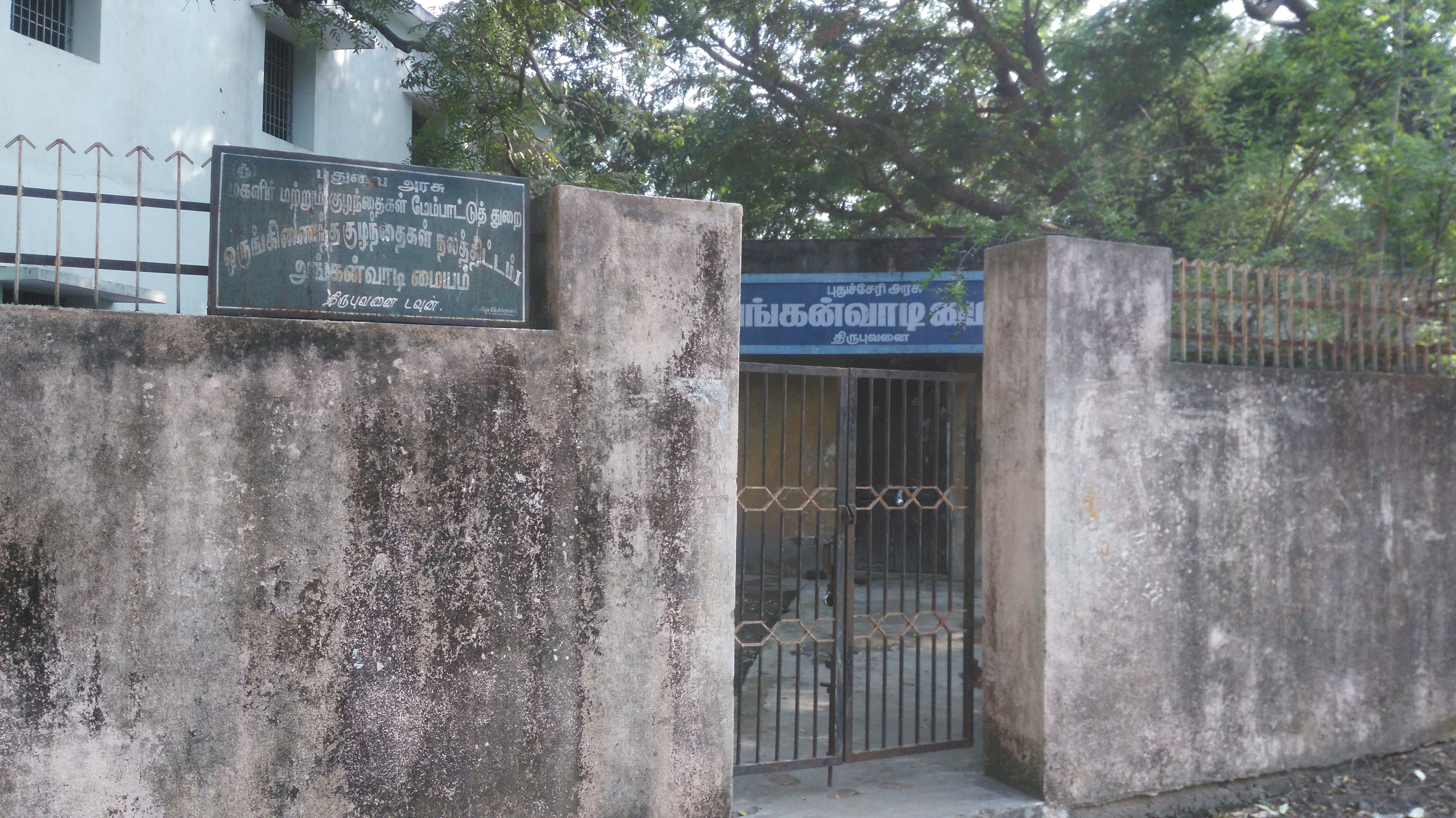
Thirubuvanai Anganvadi maiyam(courtyard shelter)

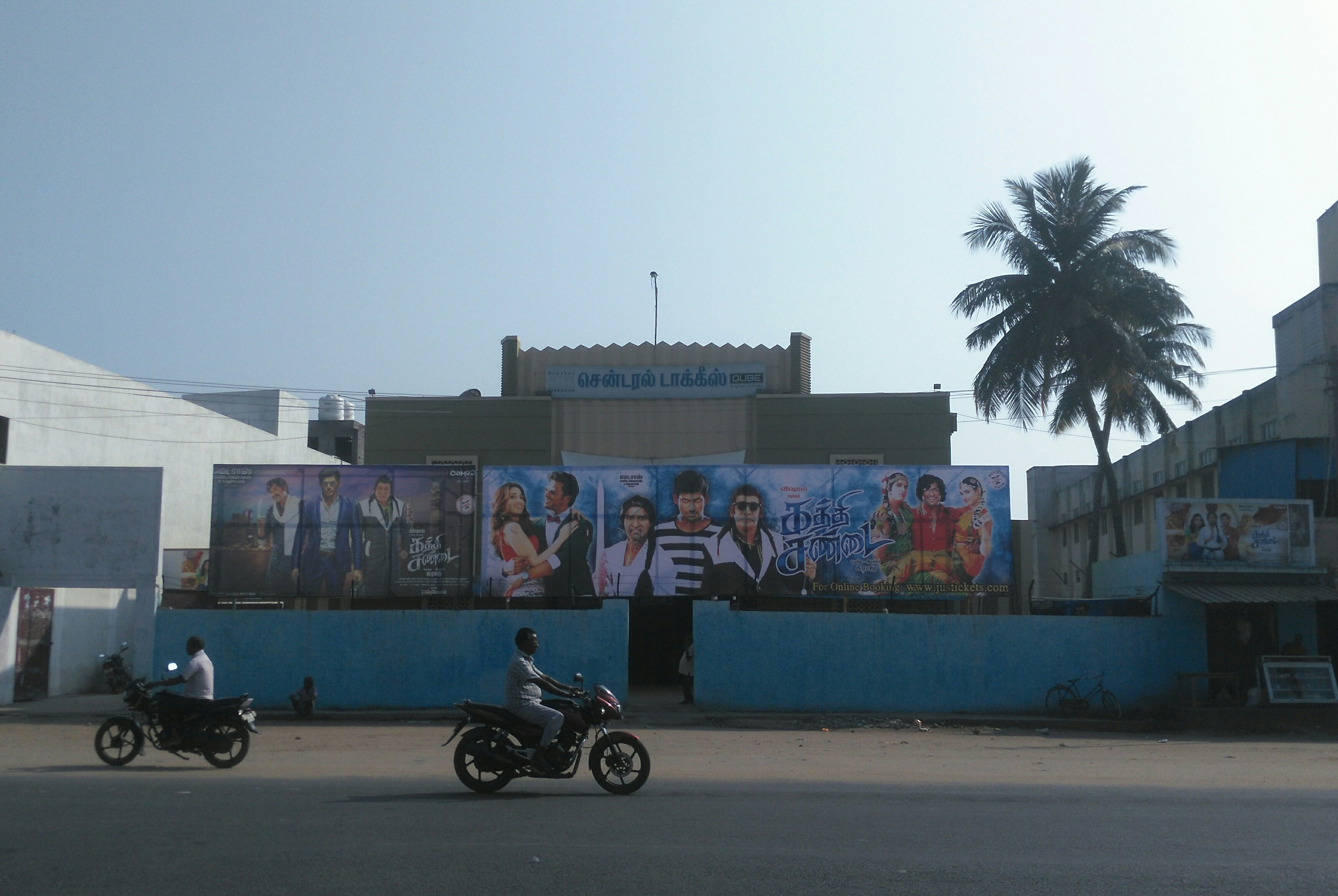
Thirubuvanai Central Talkies
