= Varadharajaperumal temple, Thirubuvanai =

Vishnu temple in Puducherry

Varadaraja Perumal Temple
- Thirubuvanai Temple
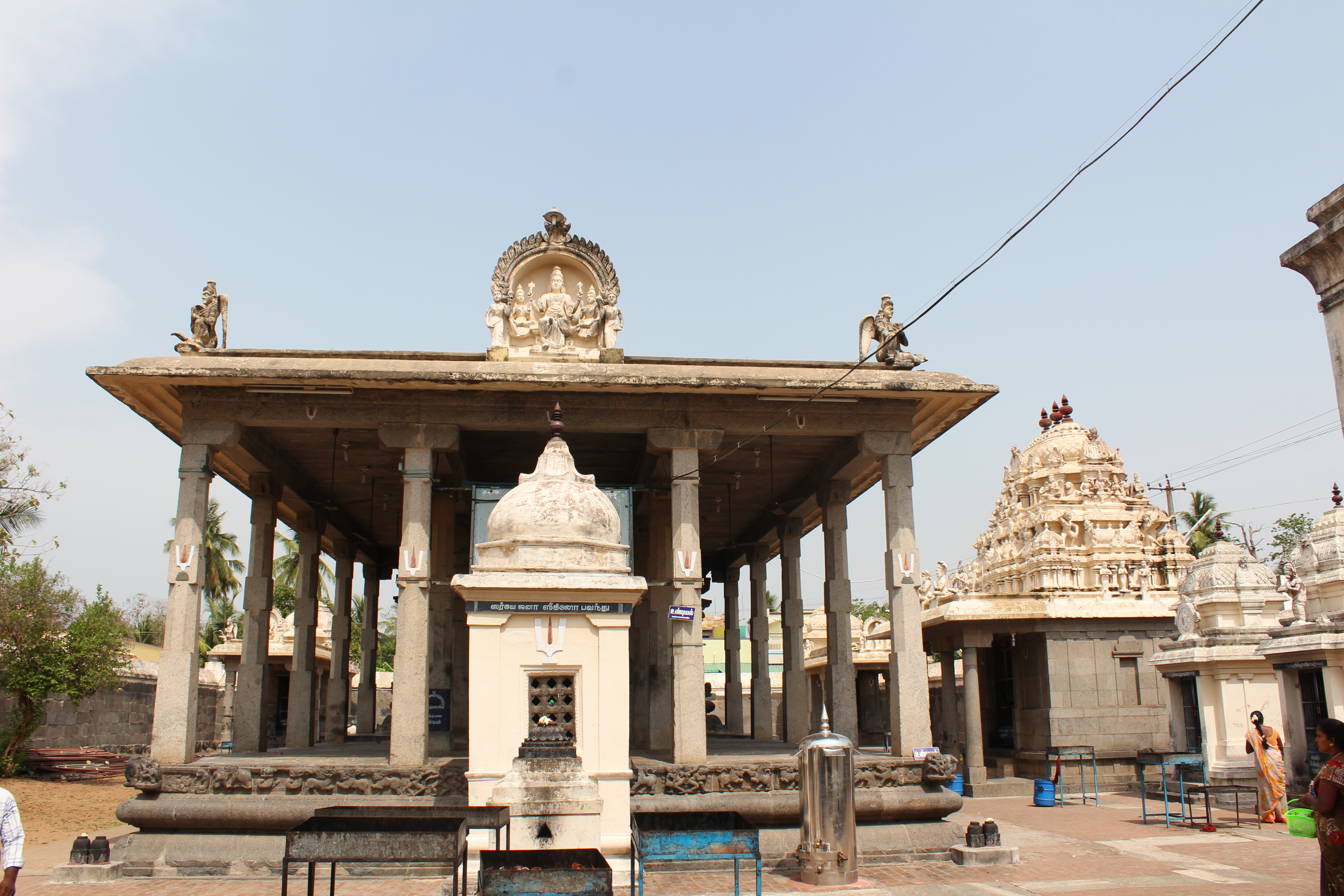

- Location in Tamil Nadu

Religion
- Affiliation: Hinduism
- District: Puducherry
- Deity: Varadaraja Perumal (Vishnu); Perundevi Thayar (Lakshmi)

Location
- Location: Thirubuvanai Village, Pondicherry
- State: Puducherry
- Country: India
- Interactive map of Varadaraja Perumal Temple
- Coordinates: 11°55′39″N 79°38′51″E

Architecture
- Type: Dravidian architecture

Varadaraja Perumal temple (also called Thirubuvanai Temple and Thodatri Perumal temple) in the South Indian union territory of Puducherry, is dedicated to the Hindu god Vishnu. It is located in Thirubuvanai, a village, located 23 km (14 mi), in the outskirts of Puducherry. Constructed in the Dravidian style of architecture, the temple is a storehouse of Chola architecture and believed to have been built by Parantaka I (907-950 CE). The temple has inscriptions from the time of Rajaraja Chola (985–1014 CE) indicating an educational institution operating in the temple.

A granite wall surrounds the temple, enclosing all its shrines. The temple has a flat rajagopuram, the temple's gateway tower. The temple follows Vaikasana Agama tradition of worship and is active in worship practices. The temple is maintained and administered by the Archaeological Survey of India as a protected monument.

== History ==
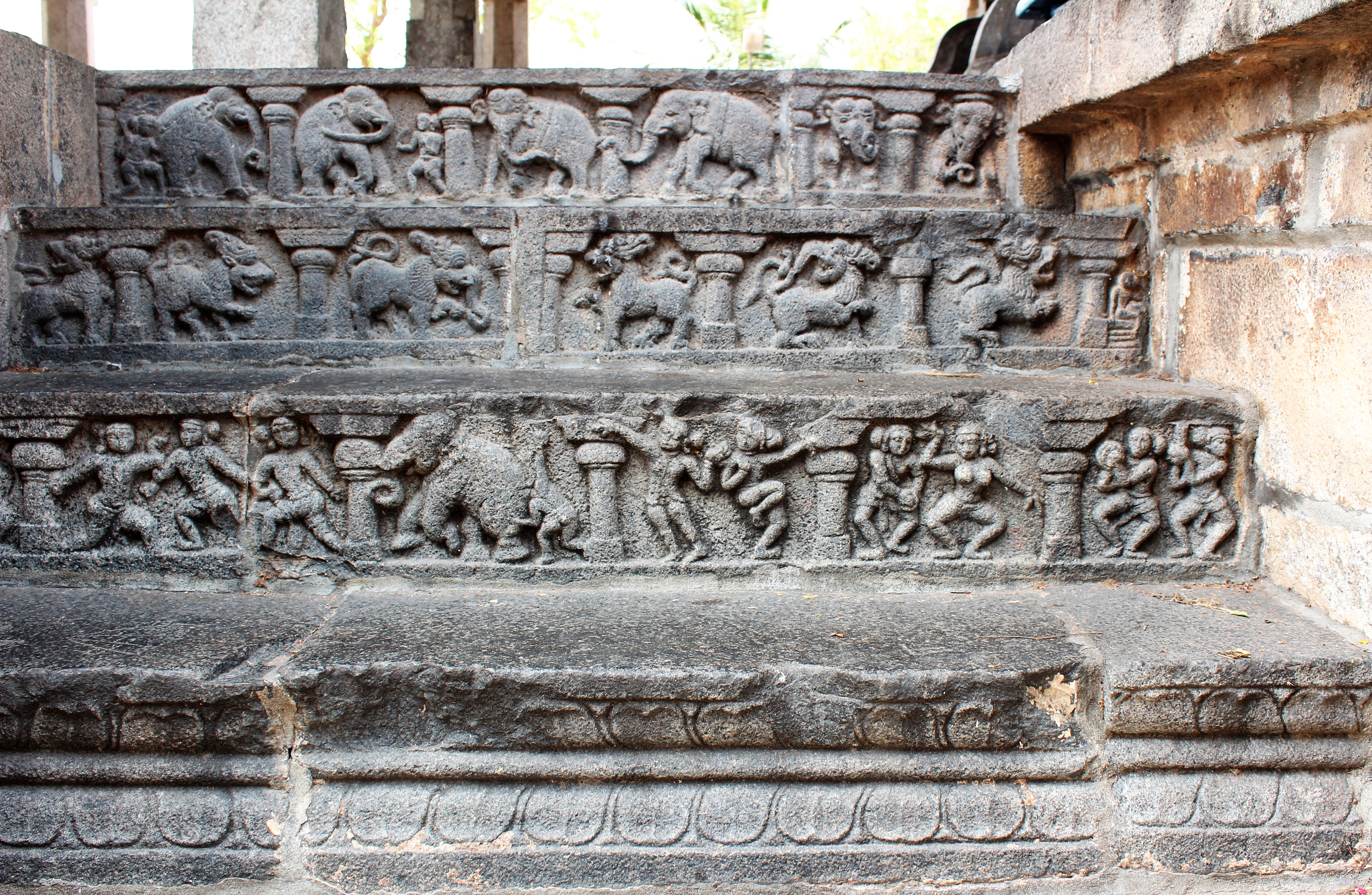
Sculptures in the footsteps

This temple was built by Chola king Parantaka I (907-955 CE) and was called Setangi Vinnagar. An inscription dated to the 30th regnal year of Rajadhiraja I (c. 1048 CE), mentions teaching Rig Veda, Yajur Veda, Chandogasama, Talavakrasama, Apurva, Vajnasaneya, Bodhayaniya Sathashatandha Sutra and explanations of sastras and epics like Ramayana are also found in the temple. There is also mention of the remuneration to the teachers and students in the form of paddy. There are inscriptions in the temple from the period of Rajadhiraja Chola indicating recital of Tiruvaymoli, the famous works of the Alvar saint Nammalvar. The regions changed hands from British to the French colonial Empire during the 17th century. Most temples in the place were destroyed during the French invasion, but the temple was spared.

== Architecture ==
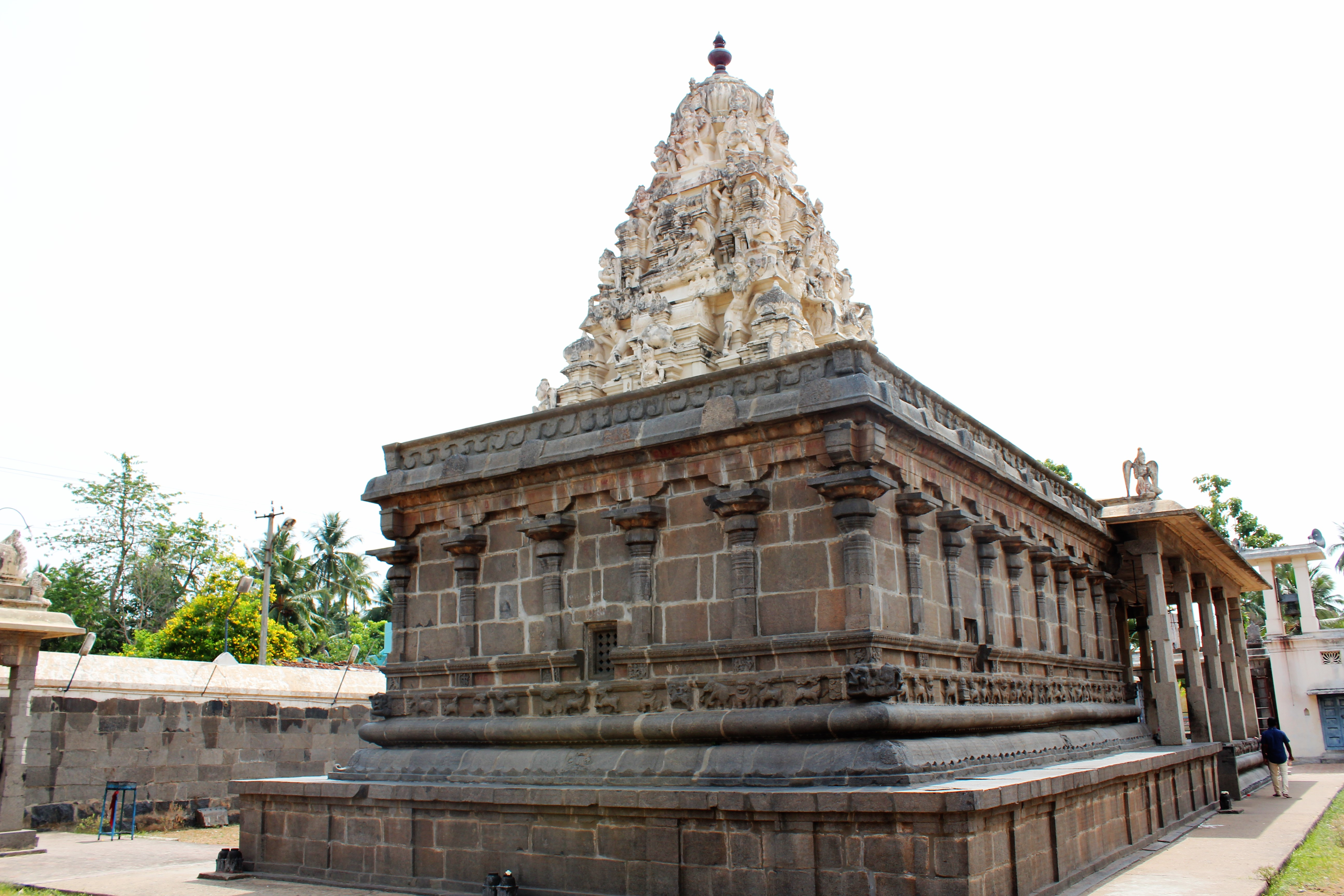
Main sanctum in the temple

It is located in Thirubuvanai, a village, located 23 km (14 mi), in the outskirts of Puducherry in the Puducherry - Villupuram highway. Like the temples during the medieval Chola period, the temple has a flat gateway tower. The sanctum houses the image of Varadaraja Perumal in seated posture 5 ft (1.5 m) is made of granite sporting four arms. Two of his arms hold the Panchajanya and the Chakra, while the other two sport Abayamudra and Kadahasta. The images of Sridevi and Bhudevi are located on either of his side. The Ardha mandapa is guarded by two Dvarapalas on either sides. There is a separate shrine of Andal in the second precinct, which also houses the festival image. The vimana of the temple is spherical and resembles the ones in Viralur Boomeswar temple and Kowkishewar temple at Kanchipuram. The four sides of the vimansa houses the image of devakostas in all four directions. The temple has many legends sculpted on its walls, the notable being the legend of Rama and Krishna. The Several scenes of Ramayana and Srimad Bhagavatham are sculpted on the Adhidhtanam or the upper foundation of the Sanctum Sanctorum. These Sculptures are very important as it shows that Ramayana was well Known in Ancient Tamil Nadu even Before the Kamba Ramayanam.

== Festival and religious importance ==
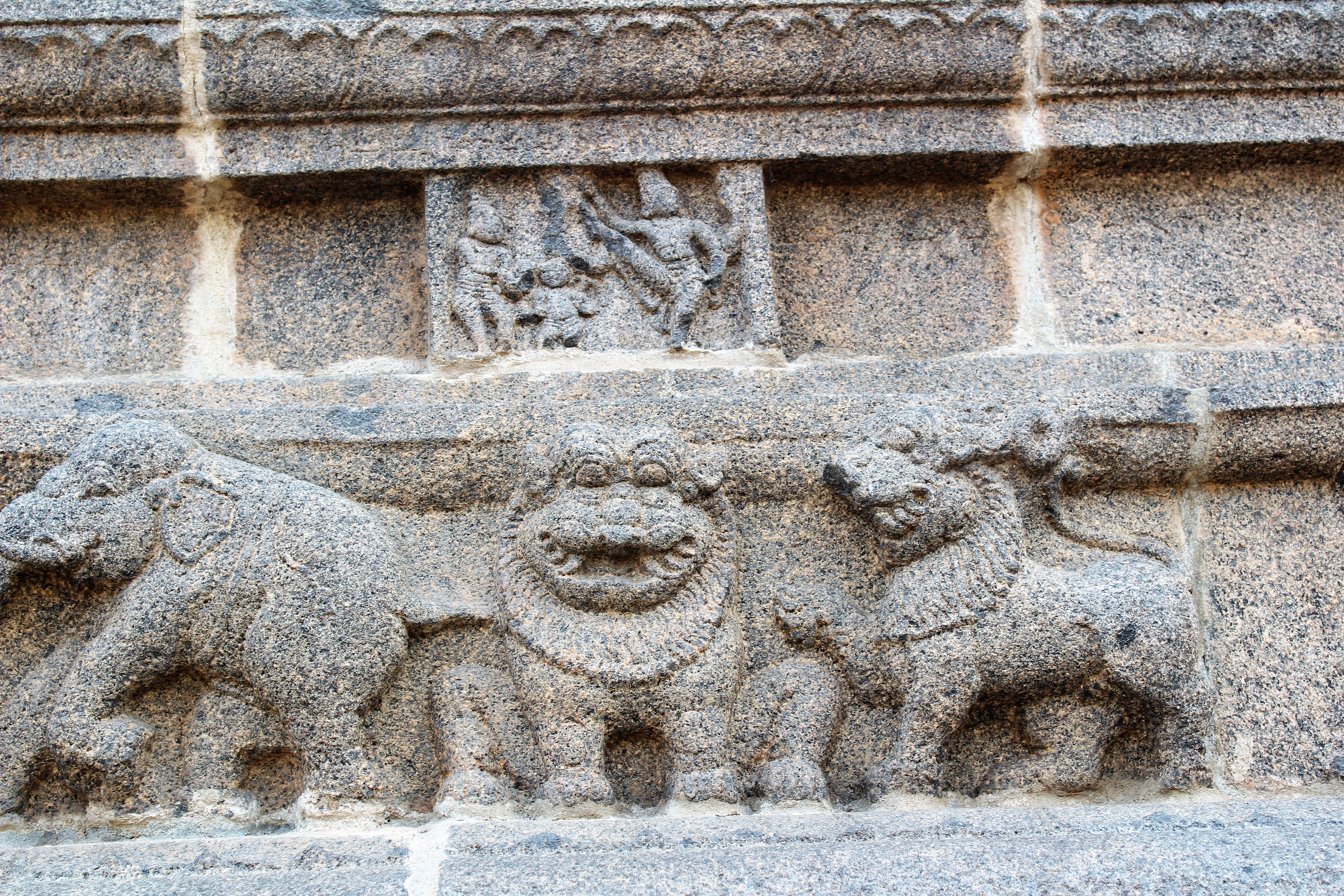
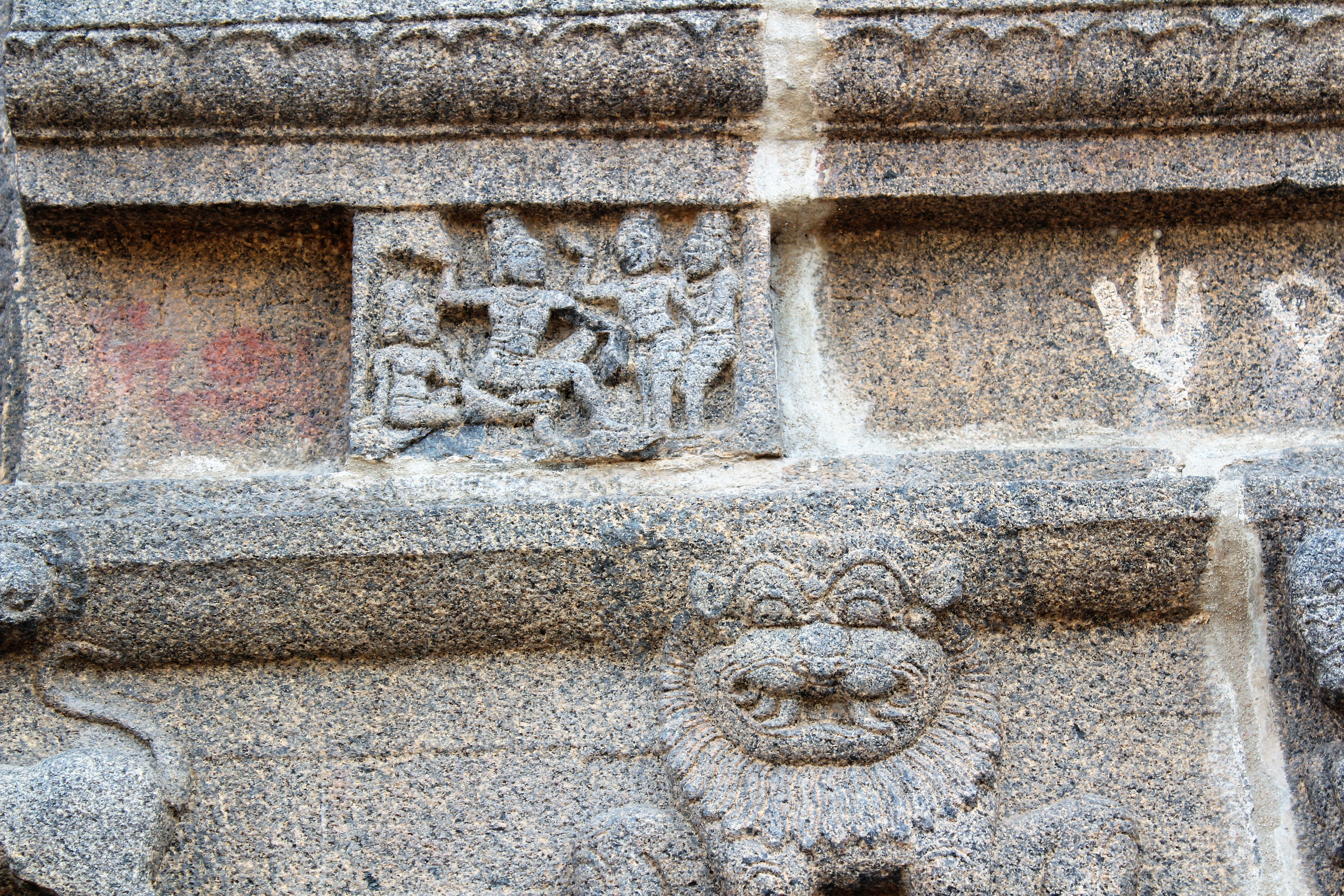
Sculpted images on the walls

The temple is maintained and administered by the Archaeological Survey of India as a protected monument. Though it is an archaeological temple, it is active is worship practises and follows Vaikhanasa Agama. The temple priests perform the pooja (rituals) during festivals and on a daily basis. As at other Vishnu temples of Tamil Nadu, the priests belong to the Vaishnava tradition, of the Brahmin community. The temple rituals are performed four times a day: Ushathkalam at 7 a.m., Uchikalam at 12:00 p.m., Sayarakshai at 6:00 p.m., and Ardha Jamam at 8:00 p.m. Each ritual has three steps: alangaram (decoration), neivethanam (food offering) and deepa aradanai (waving of lamps) for the presiding deity. During the worship, religious instructions in the Vedas (sacred text) are recited by priests. There are weekly, monthly and fortnightly rituals performed in the temple. The temple has many festivals as indicated in the inscriptions in the temple. Tamil New year during the Tamil month of Chittirai (April - May), Vaikuntha Ekadashi during Margali (December - January), Sankaranthi during Thai (January - February) followed by Theerthavari in Pamba river are the major festivals celebrated in the temple.
