= Villianur taluk =

Coordinates: 11°54′50.96″N 79°45′20.17″E

Villianur taluk (Tamil: [ʋilːijnuːɾ]) is one of four taluks in the Pondicherry District of the union territory of Puducherry. It comprises villages under Villianur and Mannadipet Commune. Villianur taluk is further divided into four sub-taluks or firkas, namely Kodathur, Mannadipet, Thondamanatham and Villianur.
