= Cranberry glass =

Red-colored glass made by adding gold to molten glass

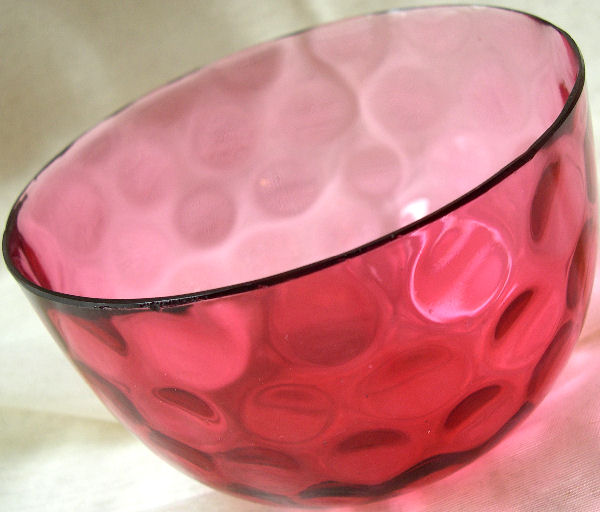
Vintage cranberry glass bowl

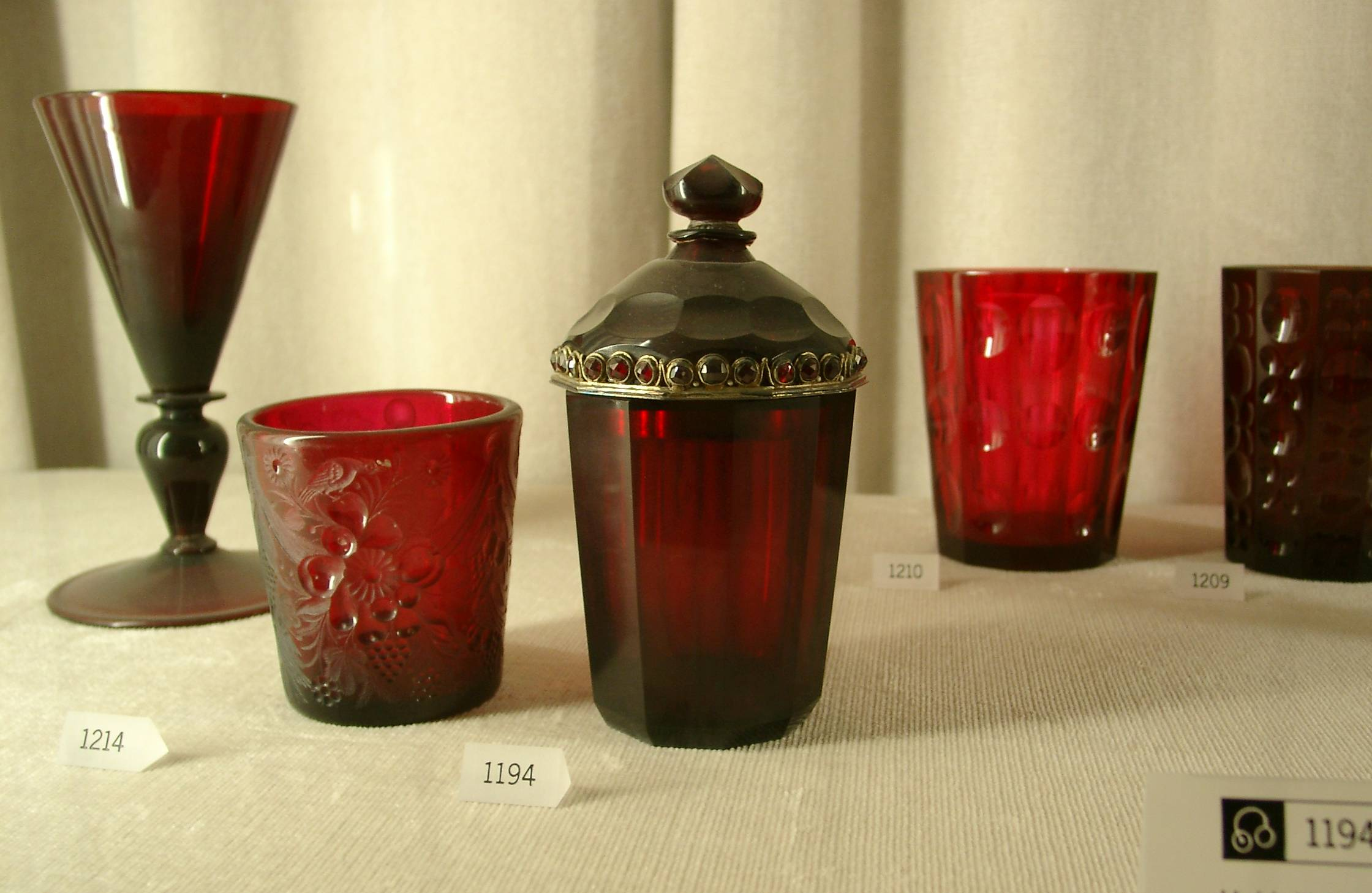
The beaker with lid made from Gold Ruby is attributed to Johann Kunckel.

Cranberry glass or 'Gold Ruby' glass is a red glass made by adding gold salts or colloidal gold to molten glass. Tin, in the form of stannous chloride, is sometimes added in tiny amounts as a reducing agent. The glass is used primarily in expensive decorations.

== Production ==
Cranberry glass is made in craft production rather than in large quantities, due to the high cost of the gold. The gold chloride is made by dissolving gold in aqua regia (a mixed solution of nitric acid and hydrochloric acid). The glass is typically hand blown or molded. The finished, hardened glass is a type of colloid, a solid phase (gold) dispersed inside another solid phase (glass).

== History ==
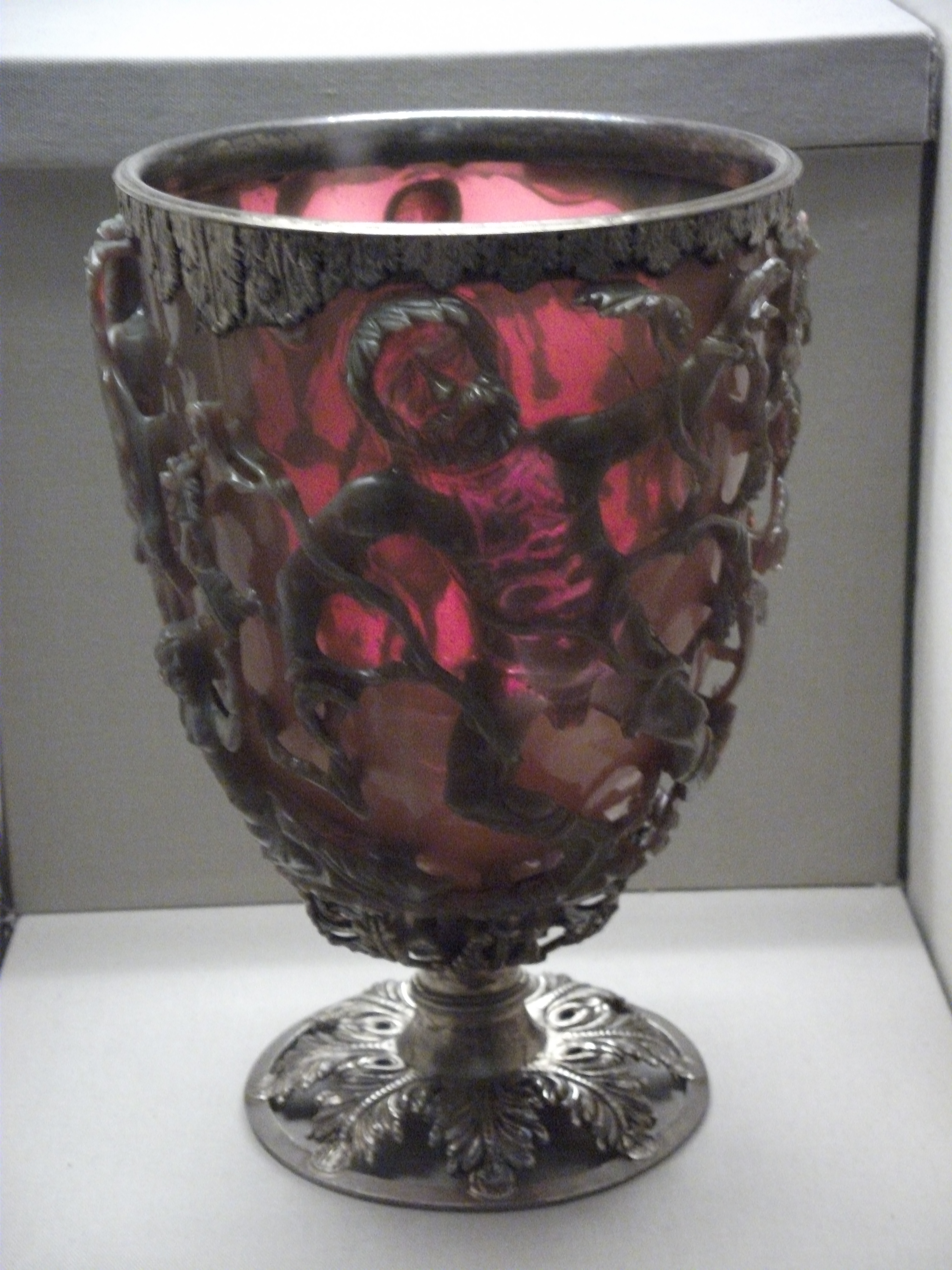
The Lycurgus Cup, a 4th-century Roman glass cage cup made of a dichroic glass

The origins of cranberry glass making are unknown, but many historians believe a form of this glass was first made in the late Roman Empire. This is evidenced by the British Museum's collection Lycurgus Cup, a 4th-century Roman glass cage cup made of a dichroic glass, which shows a different colour depending on whether light is passing through it or reflecting from it; red (gold salts) when lit from behind and green (silver salts) when lit from in front. Kitab al-Asrar, an Arabic work attributed to Abu Bakr al-Razi contains one of the earliest descriptions of the preparation of gold ruby glass.

The craft was then lost and rediscovered in the 17th century Bohemian period by either Johann Kunckel in Potsdam or by the Florentine glassmaker Antonio Neri. Neither of them knew the mechanism which yielded the colour, however. Chemist and winner of the 1925 Nobel Prize in Chemistry Richard Adolf Zsigmondy was able to understand and explain that small colloids of gold were responsible for the red colour.

The most famous period of cranberry glass production was the baroque era. Later, cranberry glass was produced for example in 19th century Britain during the Victorian Era.

Cranberry glass creations were most popular as a table display, often holding candy or flowers. Cranberry glass was also frequently used for wine glasses, decanters, and finger bowls. Cranberry glass was also well known for its use in "Mary Gregory" glass. This glass had a white enamel fired onto the glass in a design, usually with a romantic theme.

== See also ==
- Purple of Cassius
- Heart of Glass, a 1976 film by Werner Herzog on the secret of ruby glass

== Bibliography ==
- von Kerssenbrock-Krosigk, Dedo (2001). Rubinglas des ausgehenden 17. und des 18. Jahrhunderts [Cranberry glass of the later 17th and of the 18th centuries]. Mainz: Zabern. ISBN 3-8053-2805-2. (with an overview on the history of cranberry glass in general)
