= Archaeological Museum, Milan =

Museum in Milan

Archaeological Museum of Milan
- Civico Museo Archeologico di Milano
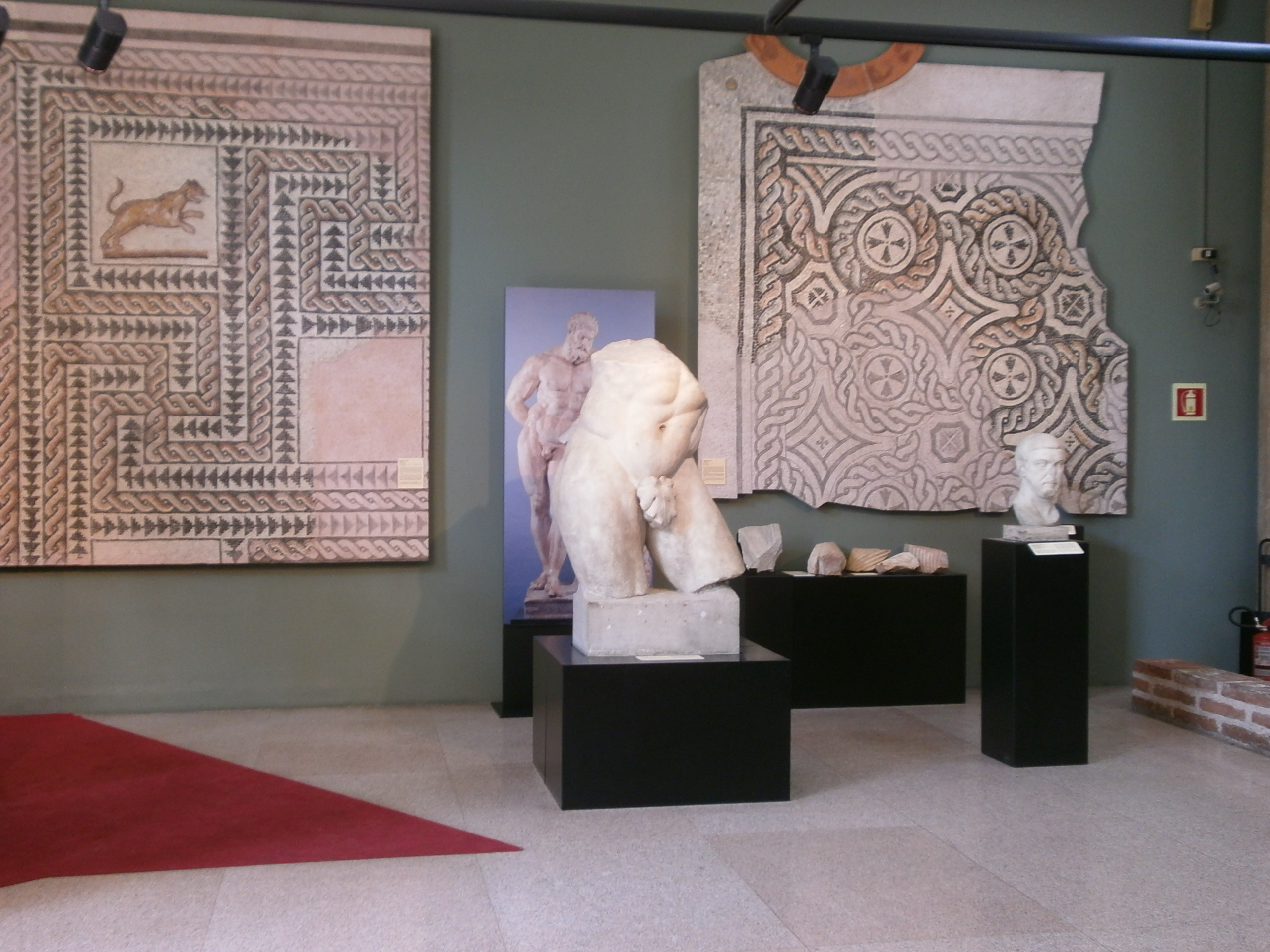
- Location: Corso Magenta, 15 - 20123 Milan, Italy
- Coordinates: 45°27′56.23″N 9°10′43.4″E
- Website: http://www.comune.milano.it/museoarcheologico

The Archaeological Museum of Milan (Civico Museo Archeologico di Milano in Italian) is located in the ex-convent of the Monastero Maggiore, alongside the ancient church of San Maurizio al Monastero Maggiore, with entrance on Corso Magenta.

== Galleries ==
The first part of the museum, sited in the original site of Corso Magenta, is dedicated to the history of Mediolanum (ancient Milan) founded in the 4th century BC and conquered by the ancient Romans in 222 BC. In the basement floor, there is also a small section about Gandhara's arts. The inner cloister, where Roman remains (1st-3rd century AD) and two medieval towers are visible, connects the first part of the museum with the new building sited in via Nirone. In this part of the Archaeological Museum of Milan are sited, on four floors, the Early Middle Ages section, the Etruscan section, the Ancient Greek section and the temporary exhibition room.

In the Middle Ages polygonal tower sited in the inner cloister are exposed a Domenico Paladino sculpture donated by the artist to the museum that fits in the frescoed medieval structure.

Collections of the museum from prehistoric and Egyptian civilisations are housed at the Castello Sforzesco Museums.

Statues and tombs from ancient Rome are displayed along the cloisters of the former monastery, and a path leads from the cloisters to a "polygonal tower (late third century) with early medieval frescoes (thirteenth century) and comes out in the new museum in Via Nirone where the early medieval section is on the first floor."

== Images ==
Buildings

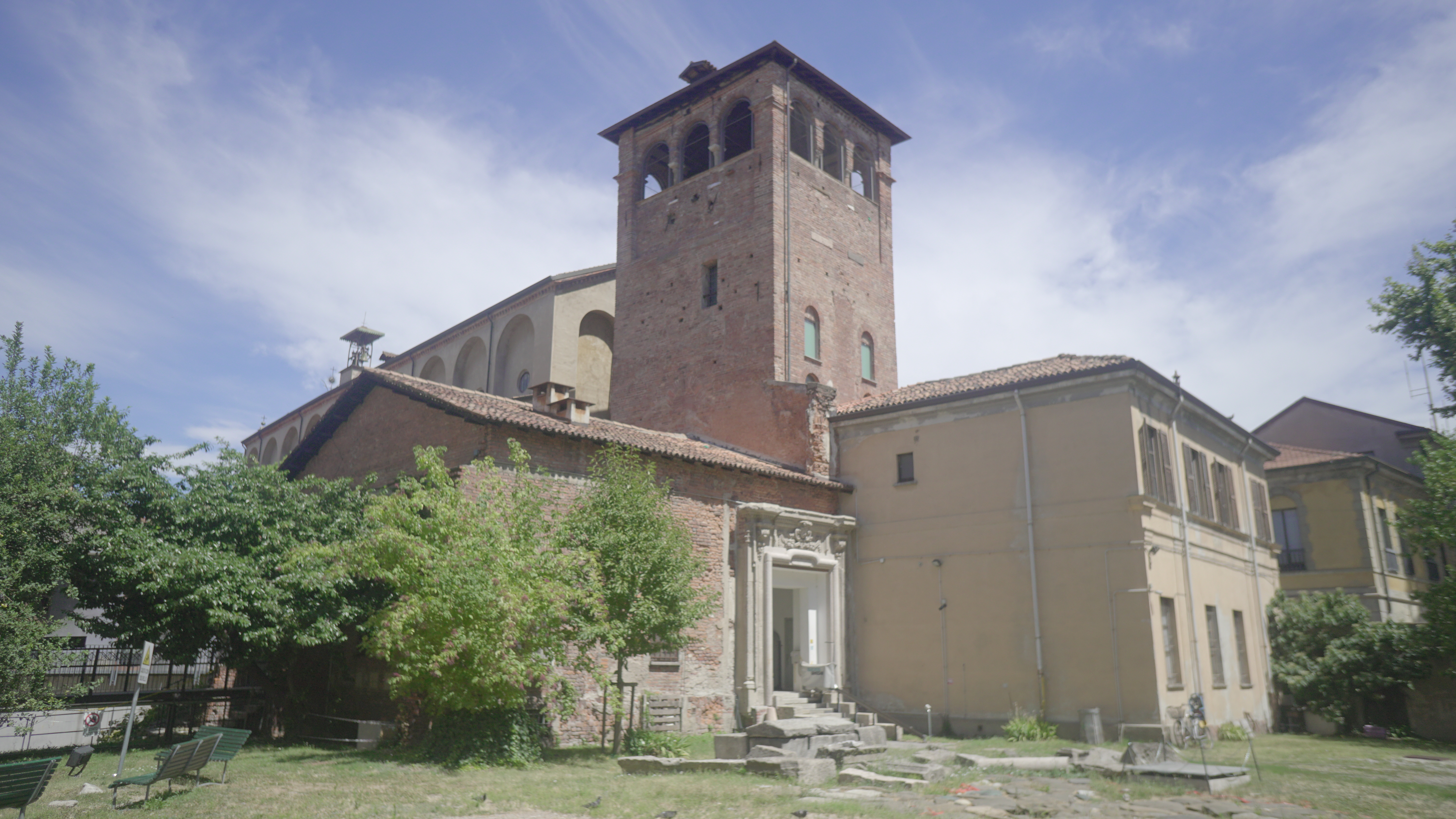
Roman tower within the Archaeological Museum

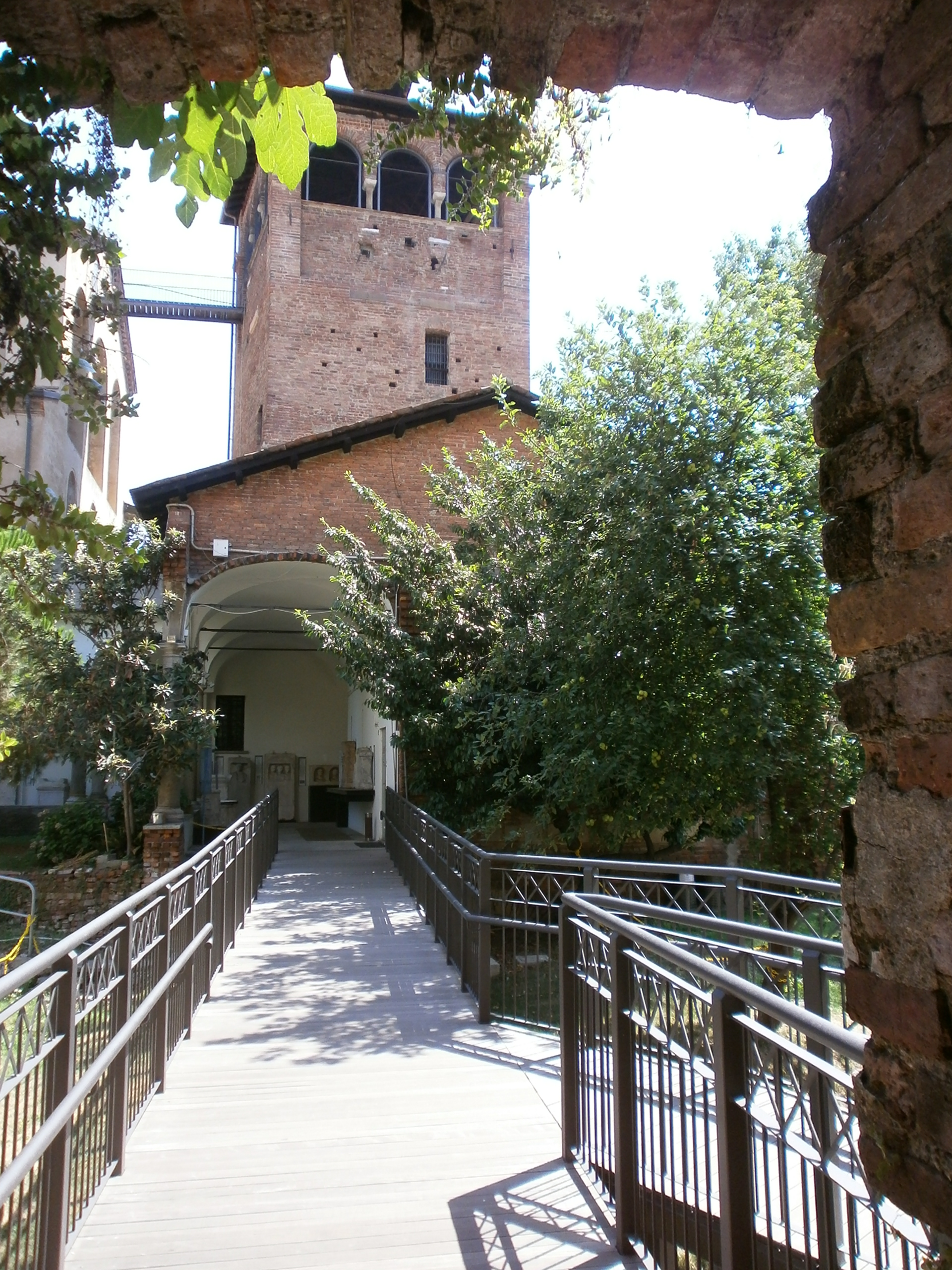
The inner cloister

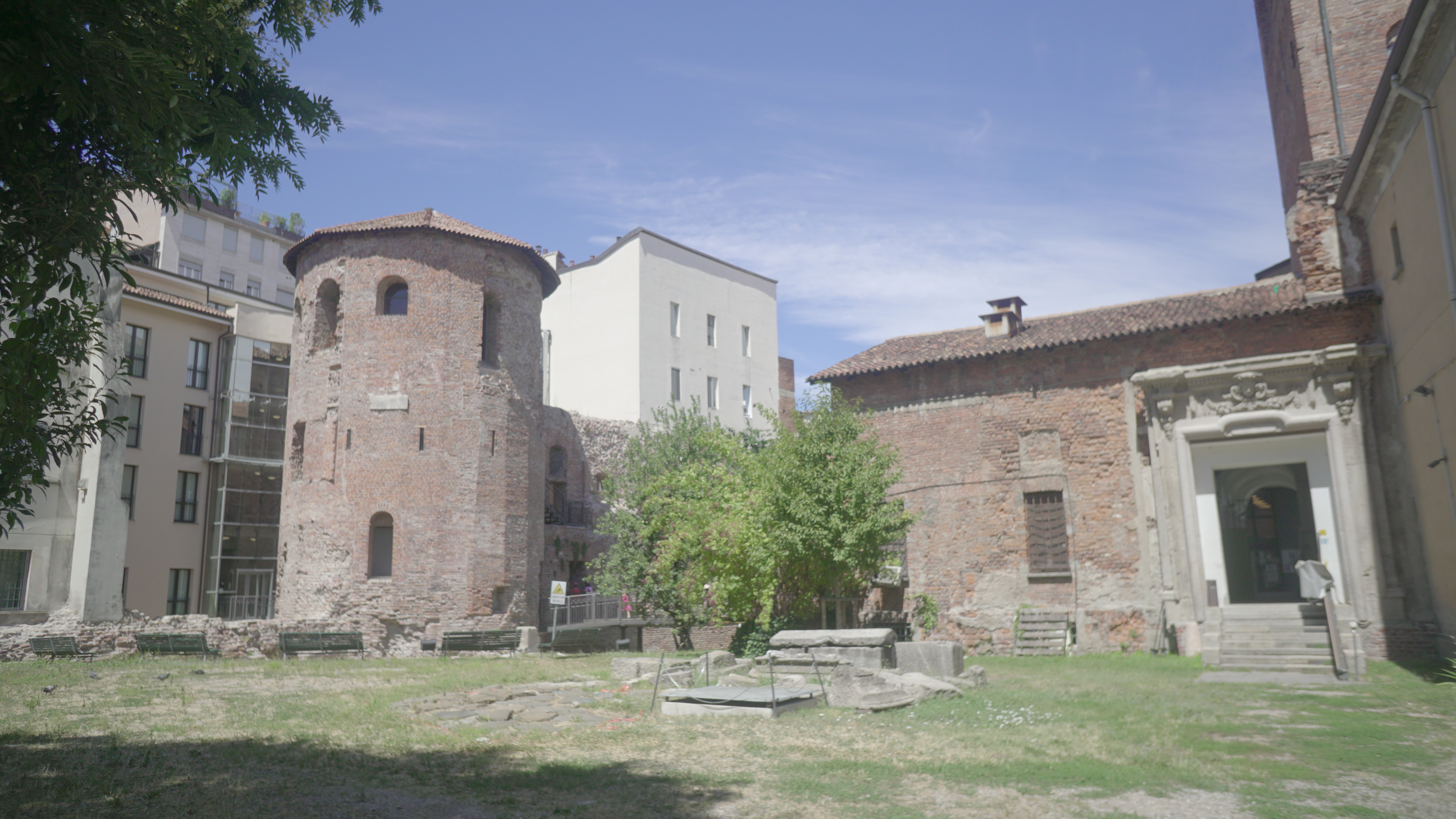
Section of Roman wall within the Archaeological Museum
Exhibits

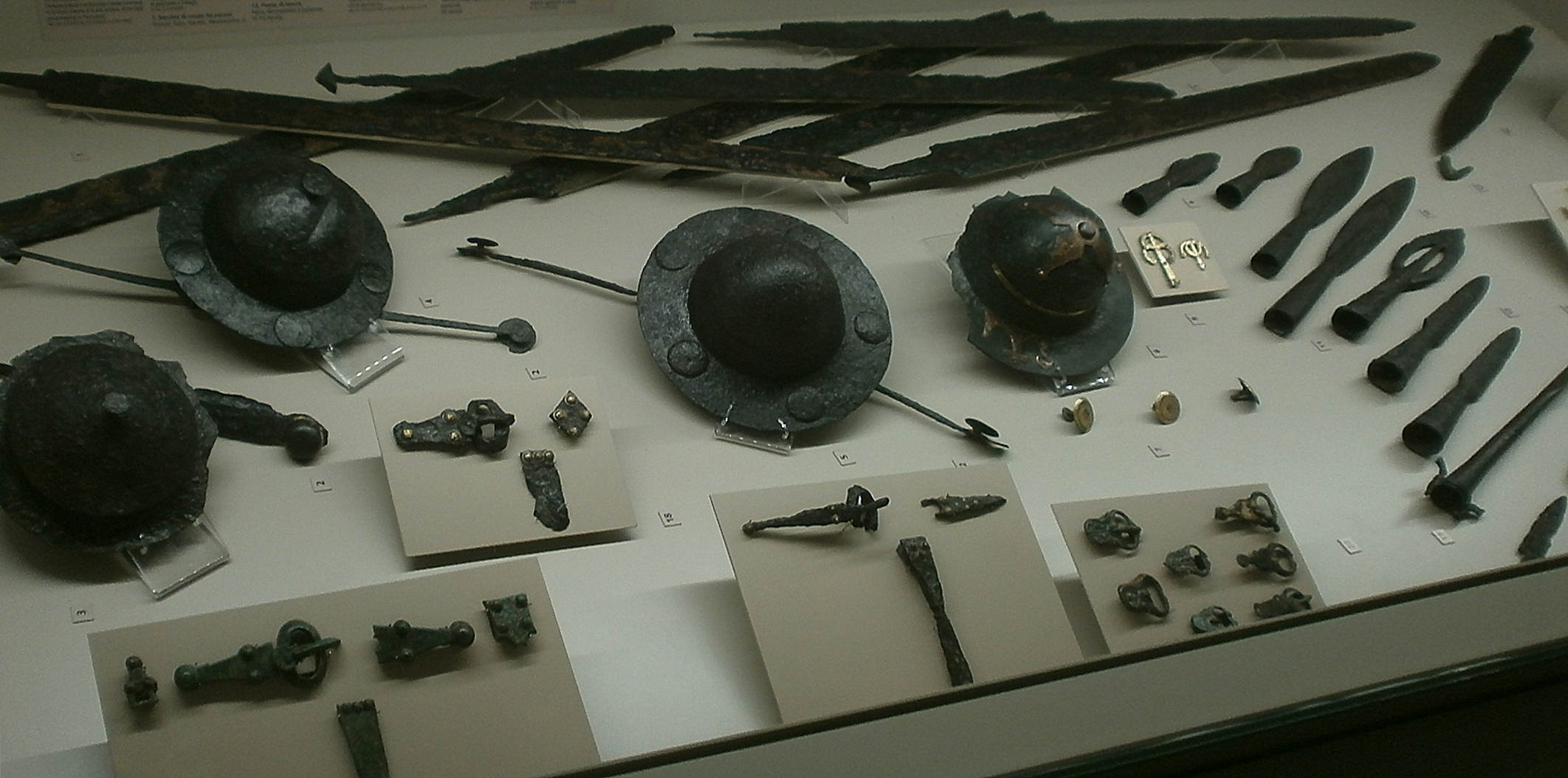
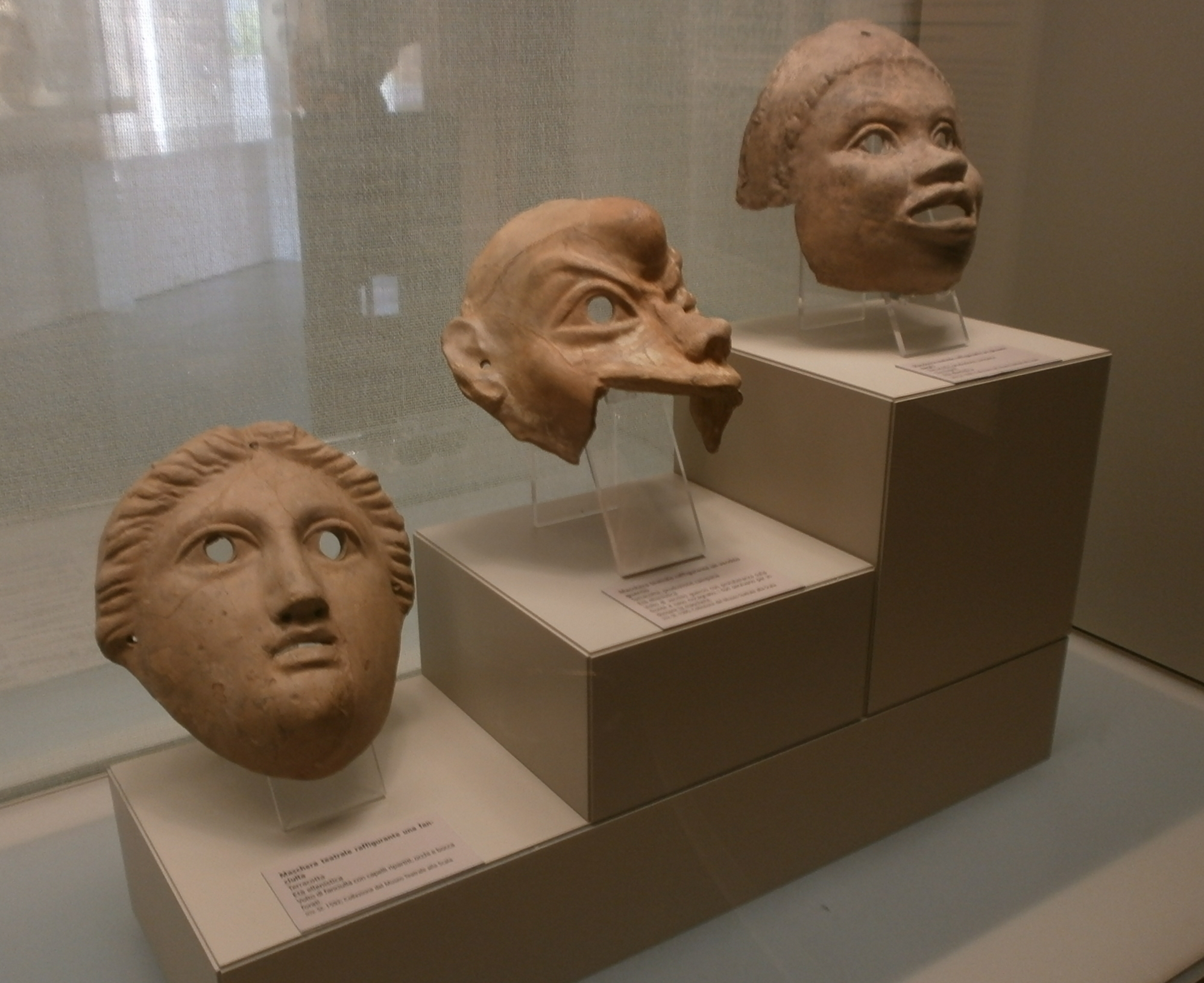
Ancient Greek theatrical masks

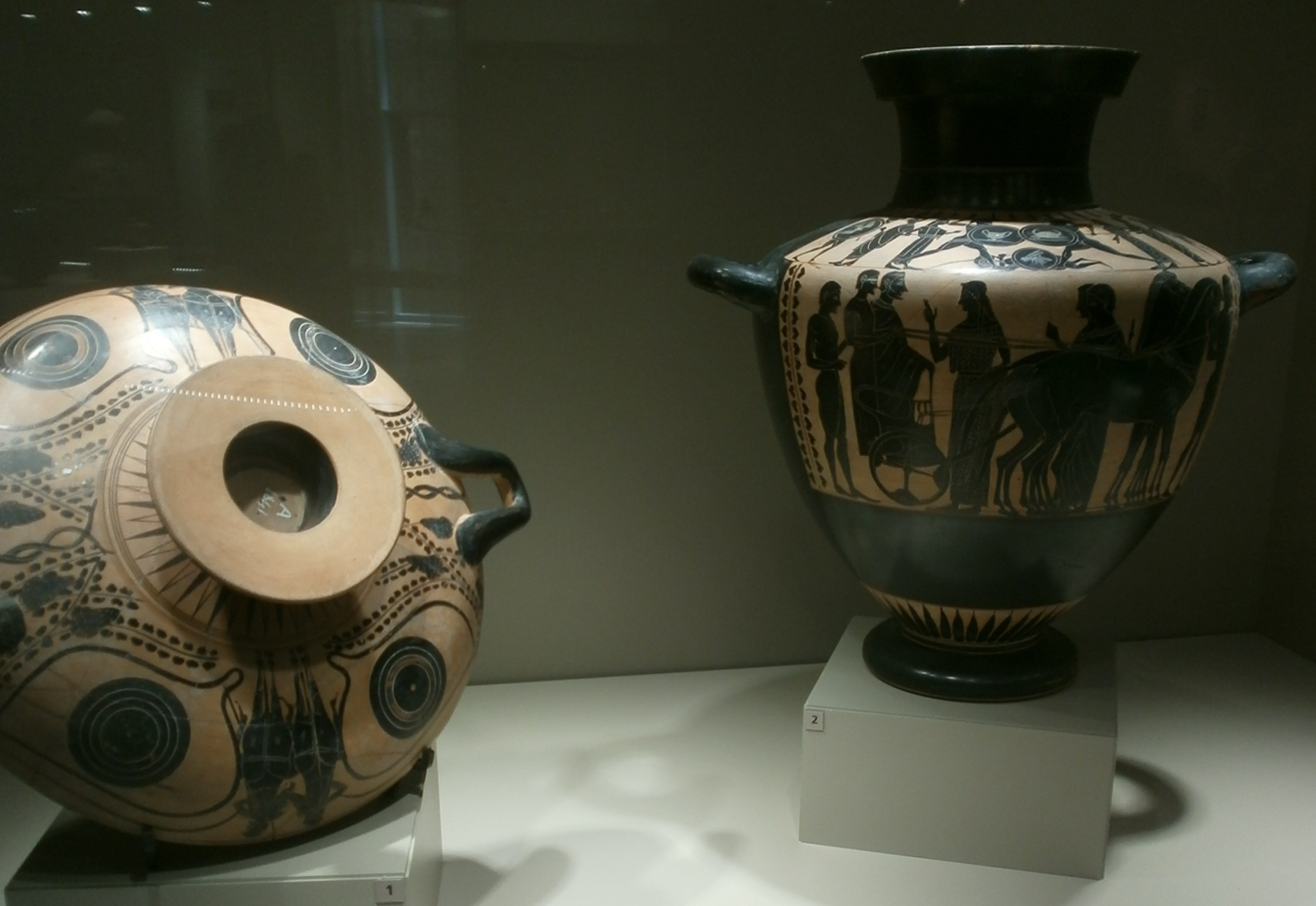
Ancient Greek vases

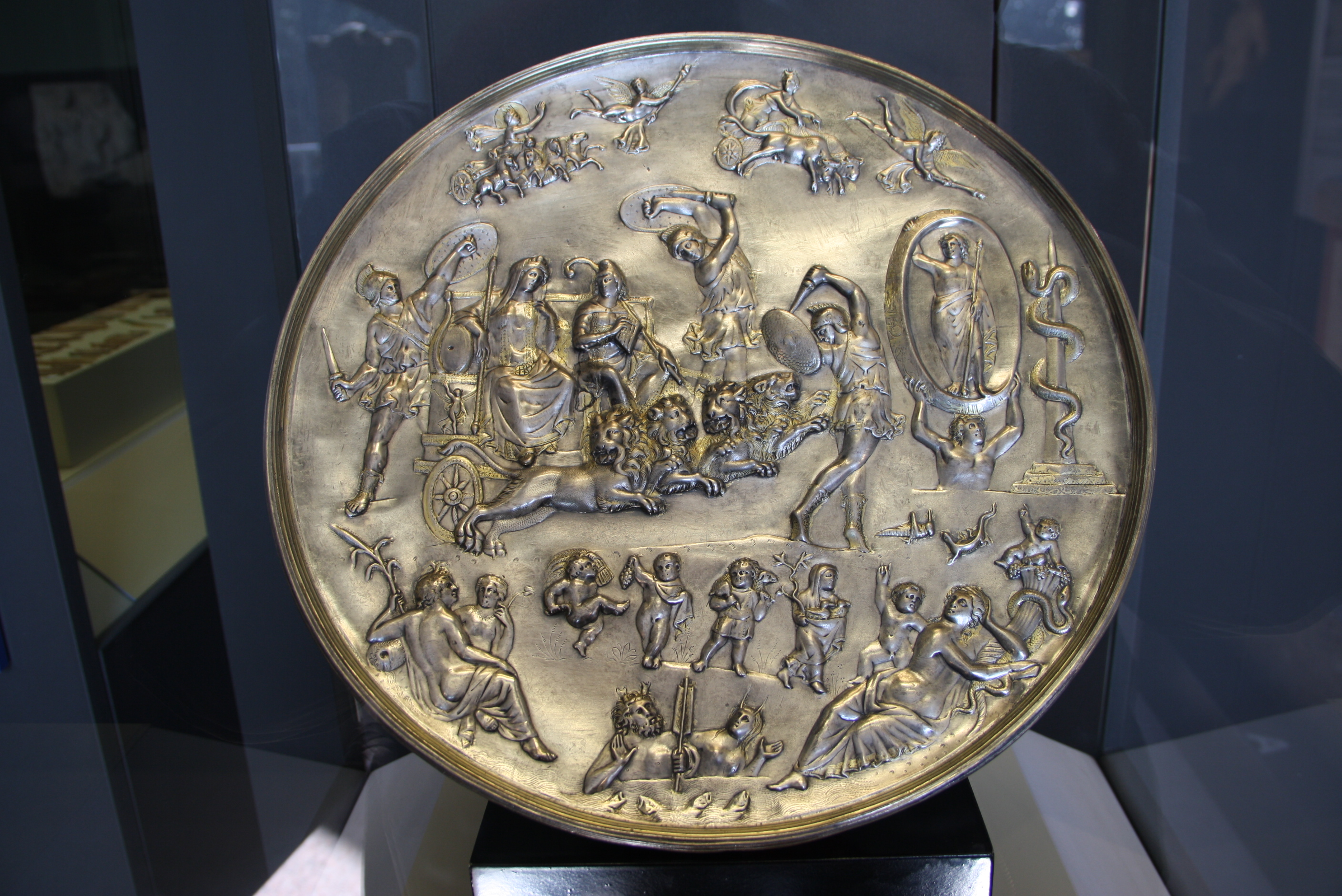
The Roman Parabiago Plate

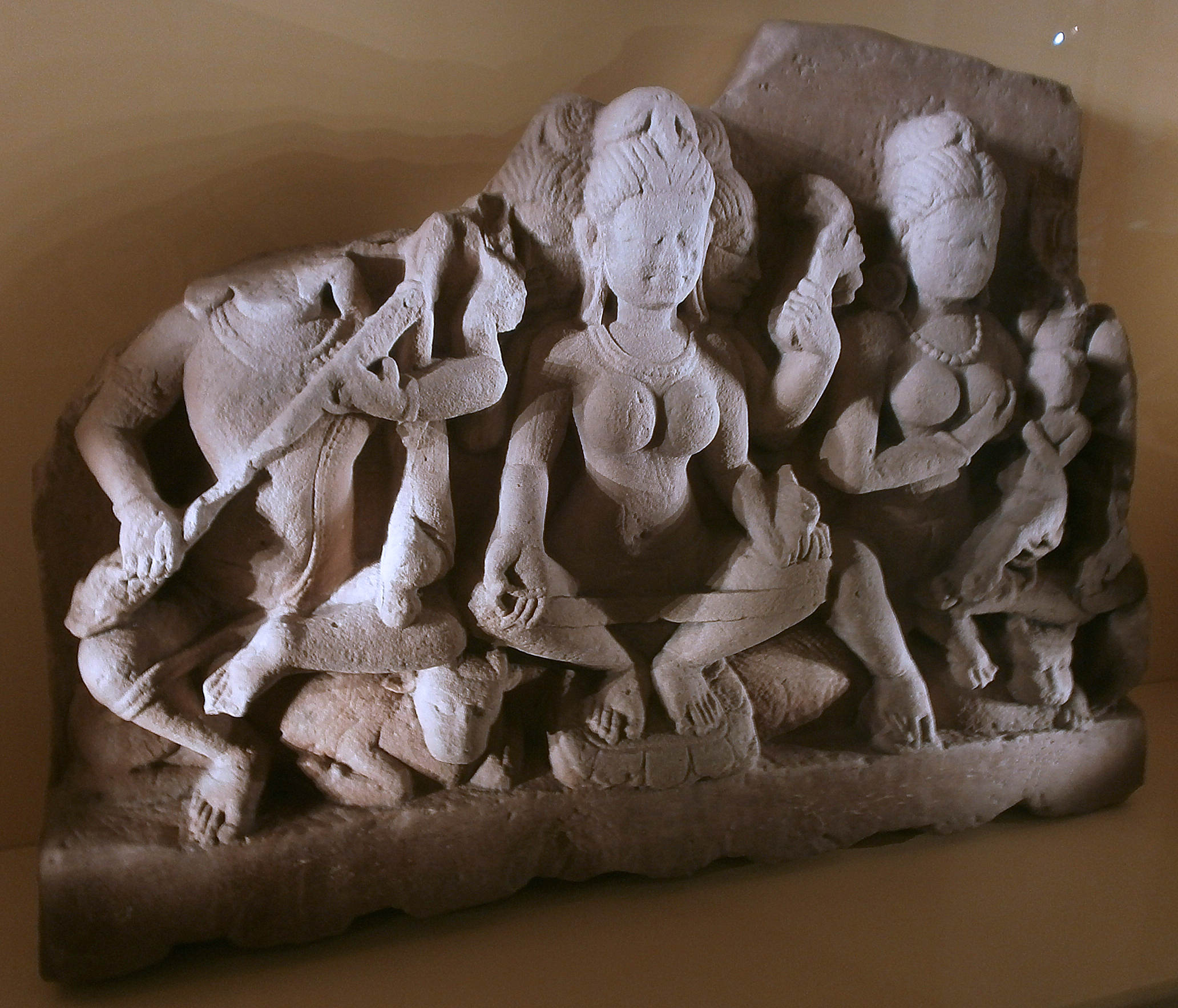
Shiva and his mother, 10th century AD, from India
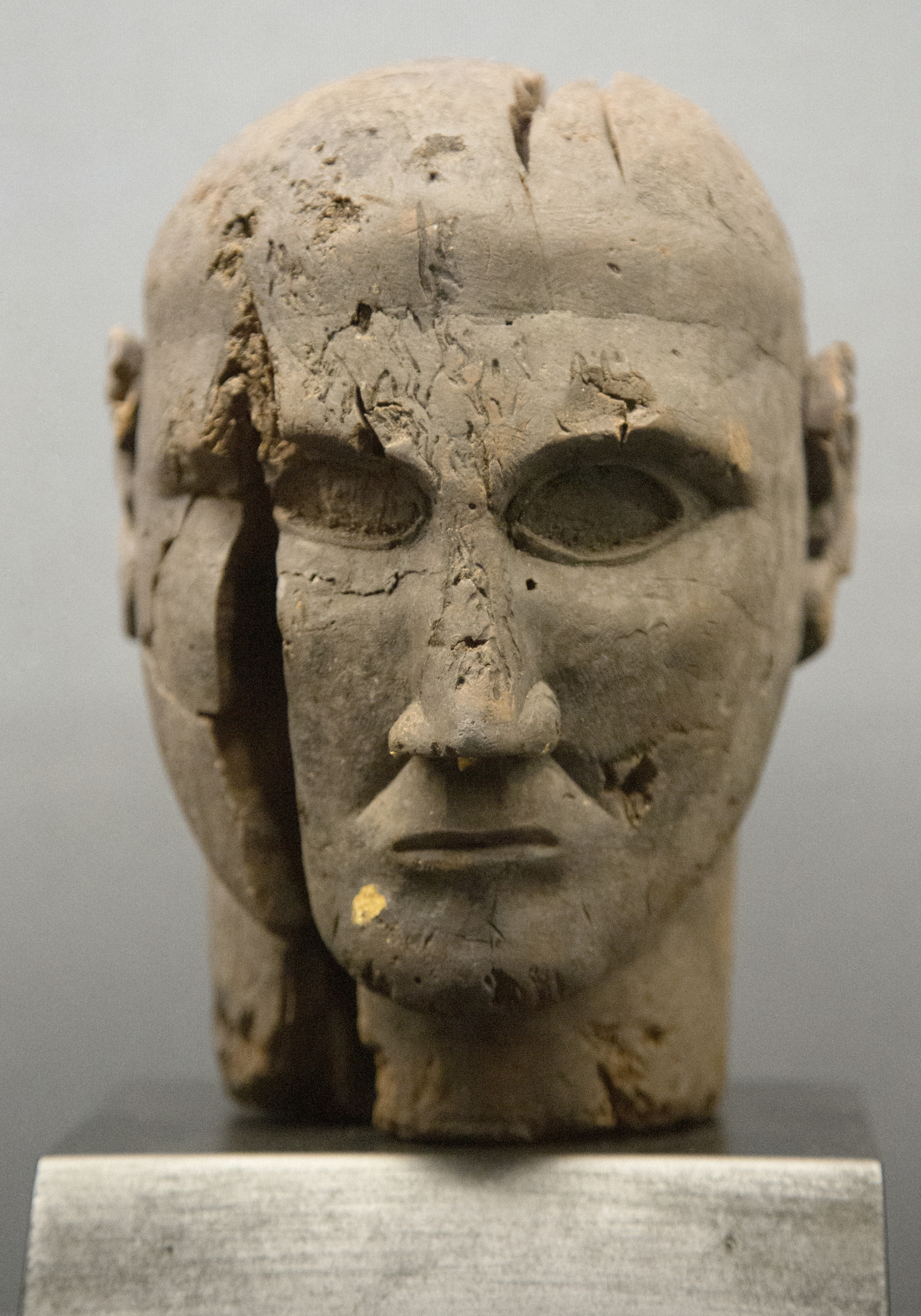
Etruscan pear wood head. 7th century BC

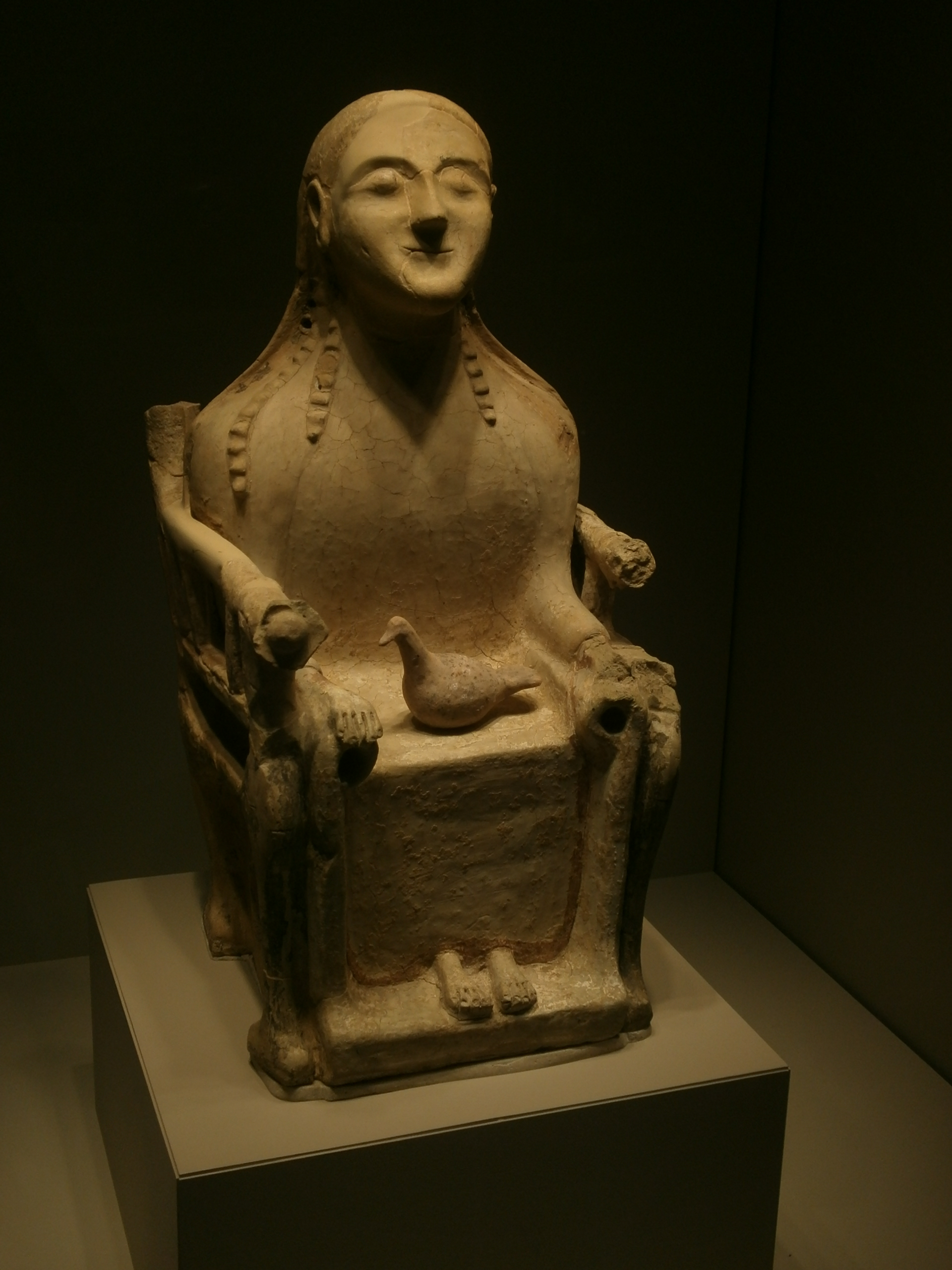
Enthroned deity, 5th century BC

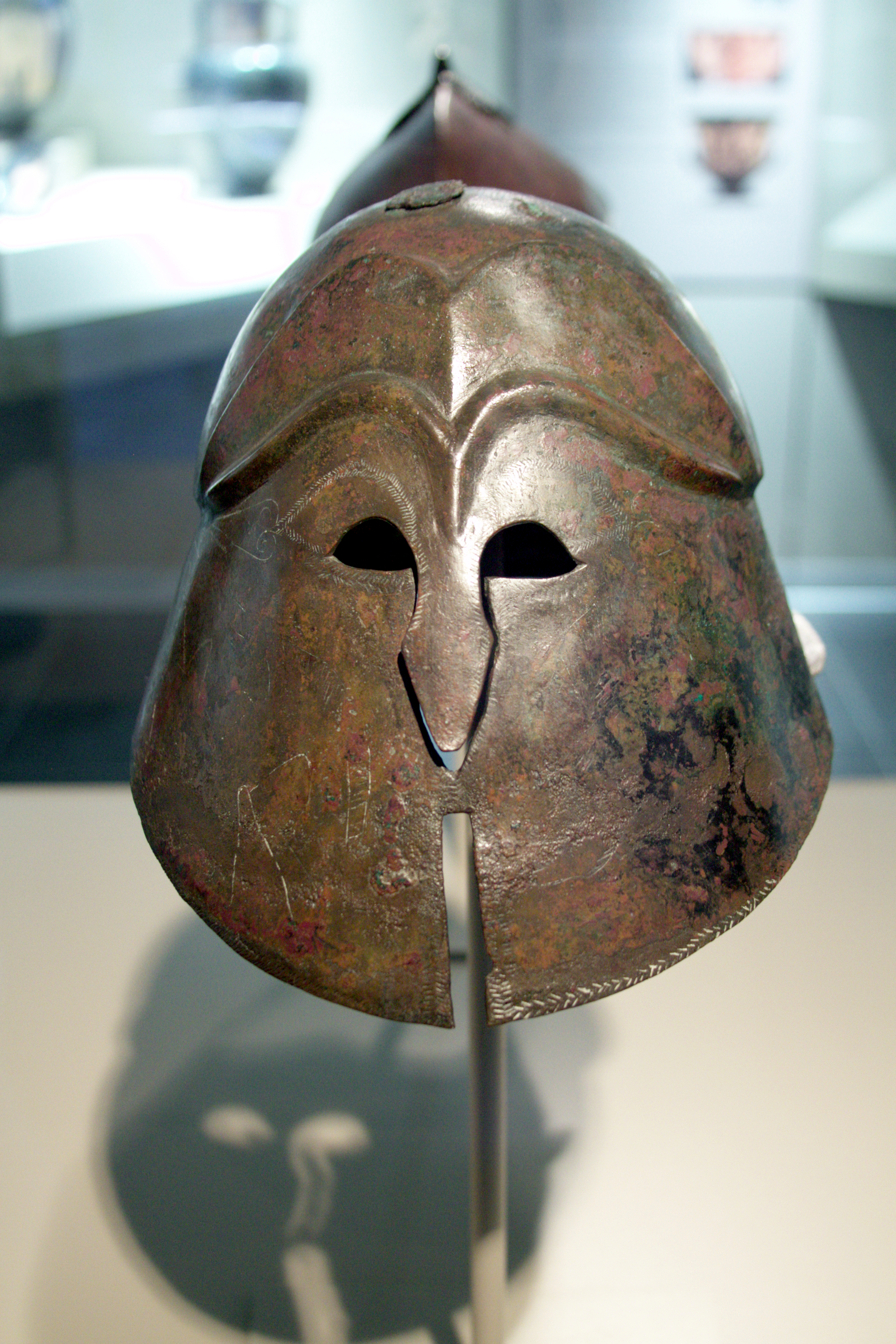
Italo-Corinthian helmet, 450-400 BC

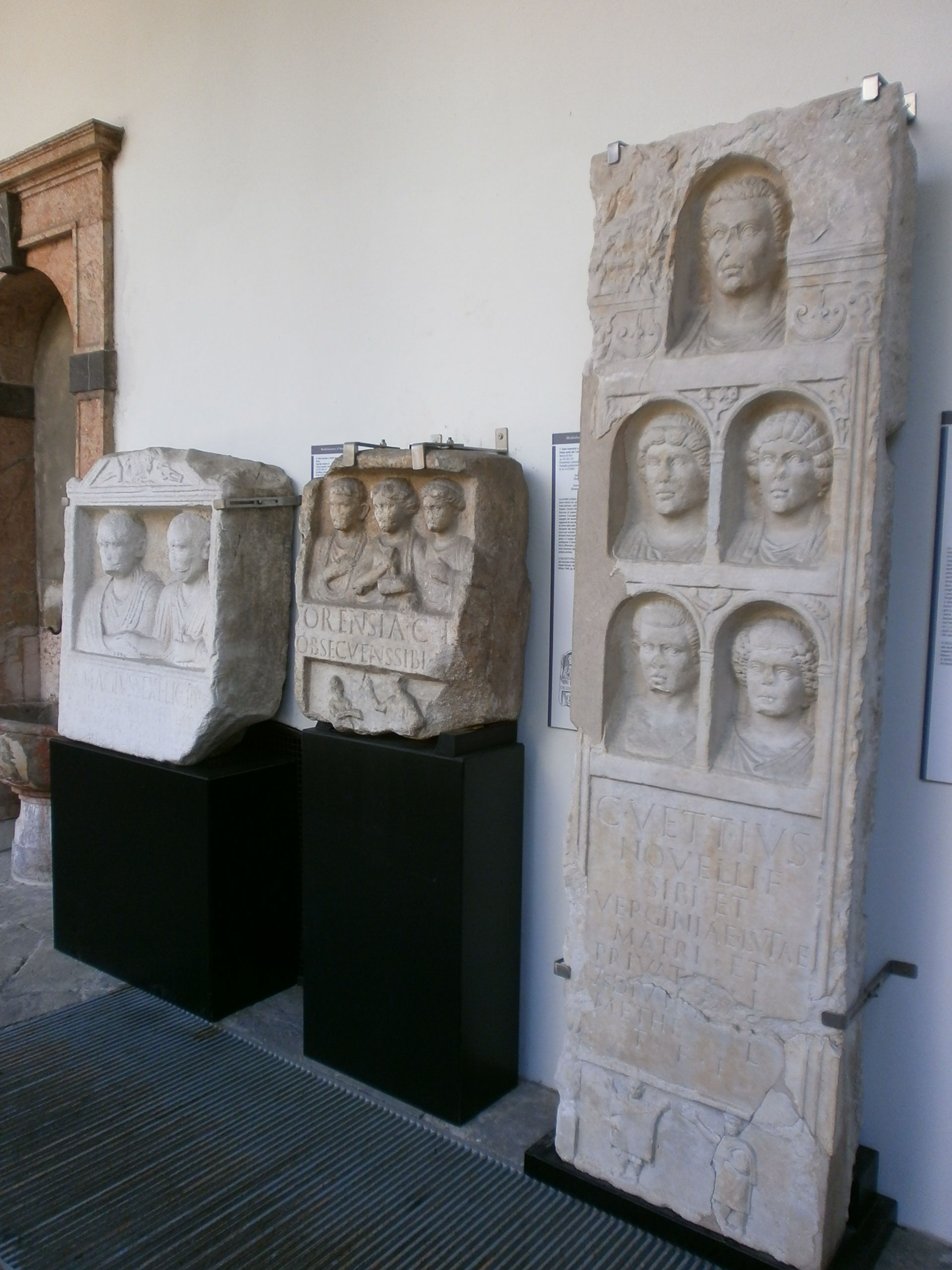
Roman funerary stele, 1st century AD

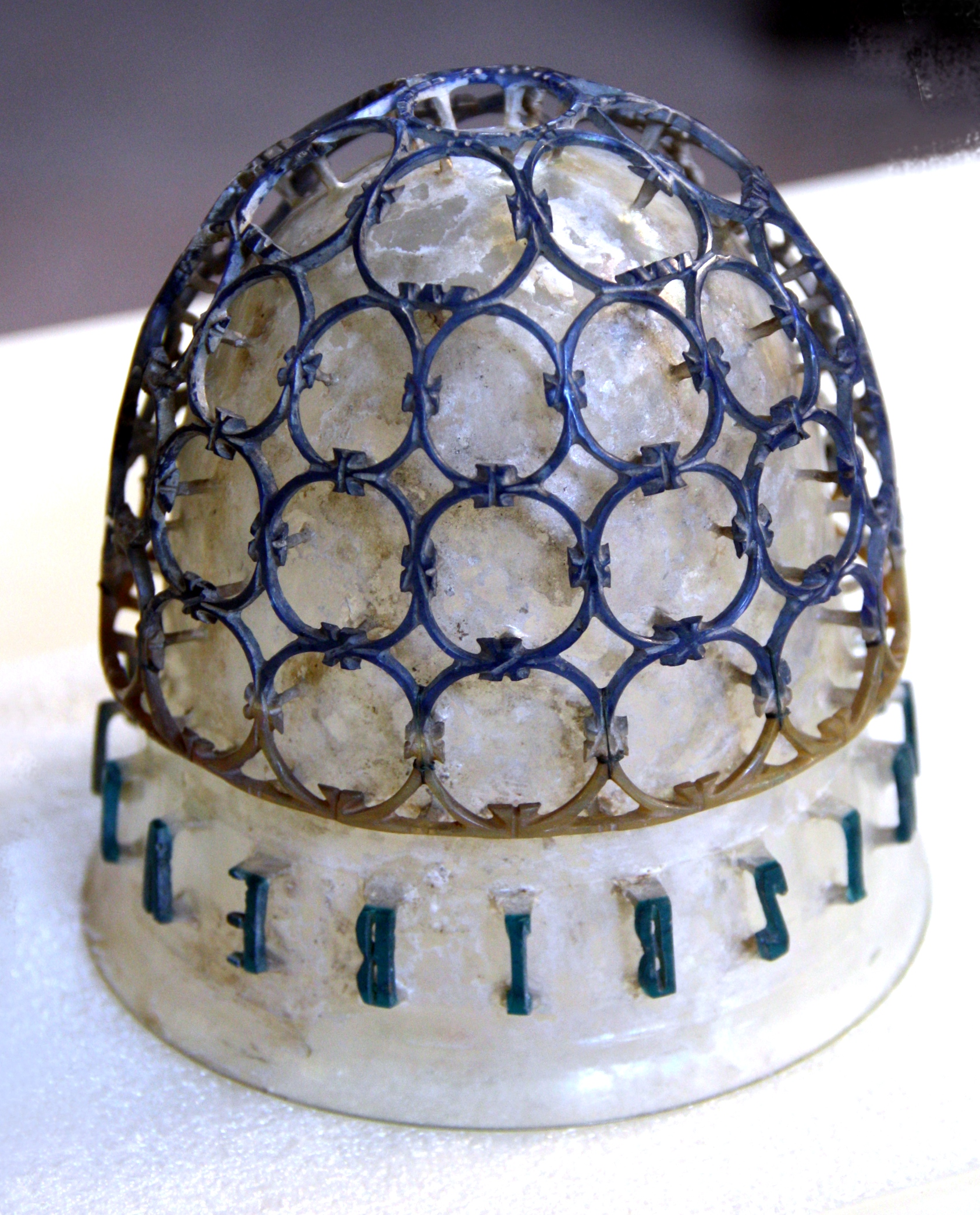
The Milan cage cup, or "Diatreta Trivulzio"

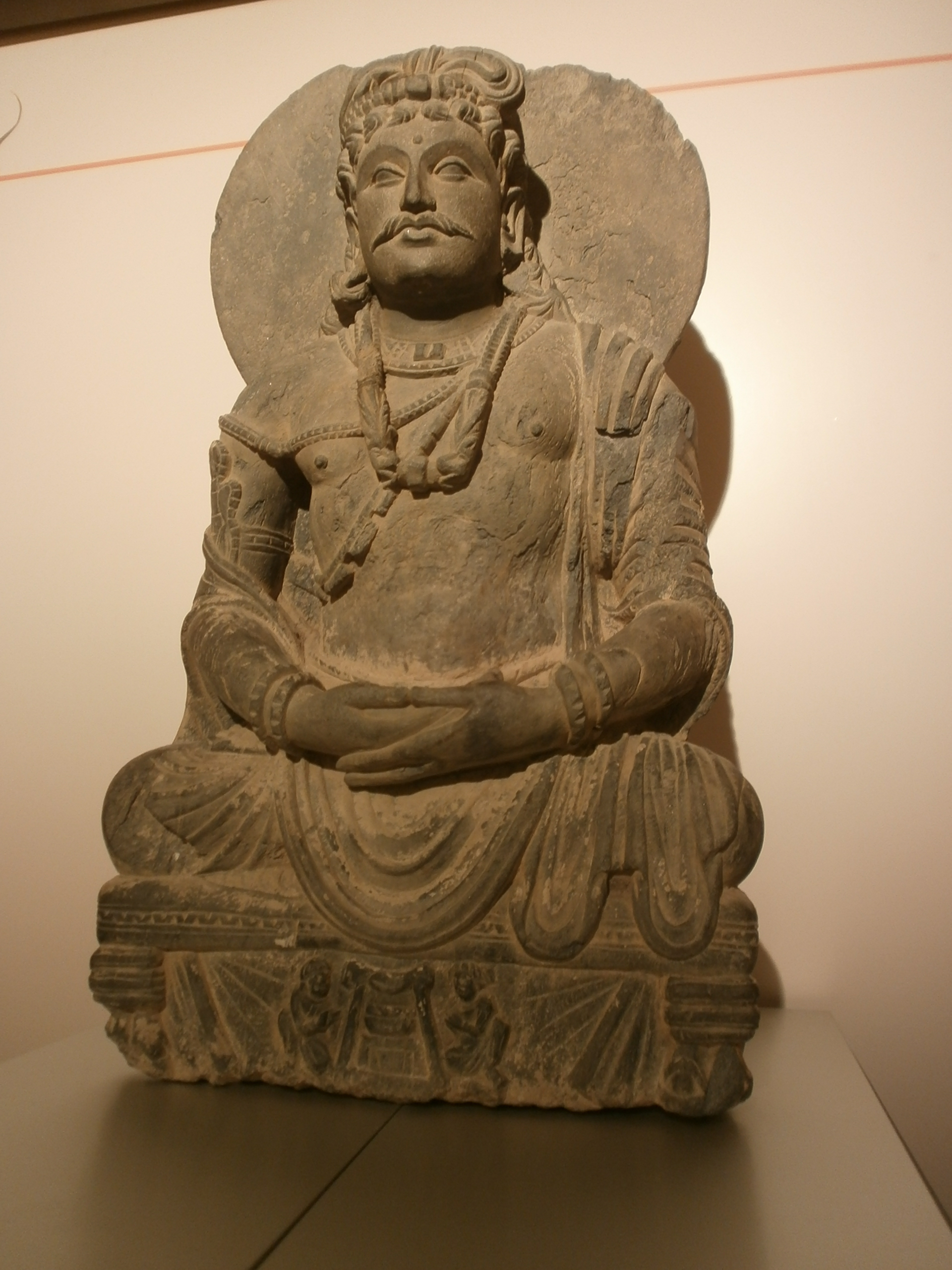
Bodhisattva in meditation

== See also ==
- Milan Natural History Museum
