= Trivulzio Cage Cup =

Late Roman glass wine cup

- Italian: Diatreta Trivulzio
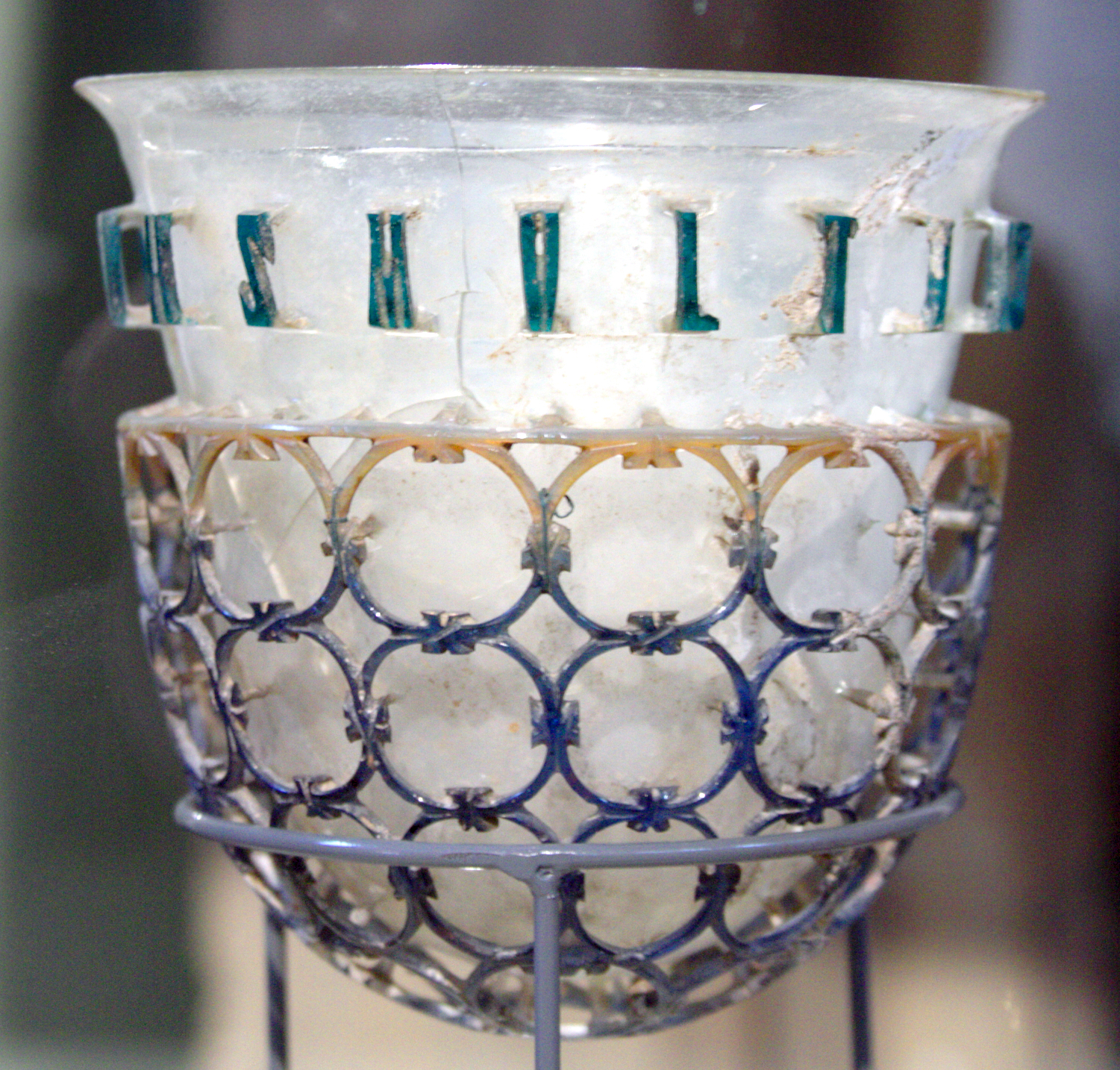
- Material: Glass
- Size: 12 cm (4.7 in) high
- Writing: Latin: BIBE VIVAS MVLTIS ANNIS
- Created: 4th century AD
- Discovered: In an ancient sarcophagus near Novara, Italy
- Present location: Archaeological Museum, Milan, Italy
- Culture: Roman culture

The Trivulzio Cage Cup (Italian: Diatreta Trivulzio) is a glass wine cup realized in the 4th century AD. It is one of the best-preserved late-Roman cage cups.

== Description ==
The cup consists of two parts: an inner cup-shaped container and an outer cage that encloses it. The cup is made of colorless glass with shades of emerald green, light hazelnut, and dark blue. The outer cage has the shape of a delicate web of brown and blue glass circles linked with a cross motif at the points of contact. It is connected to the container by thin glass stems. Underneath the lip is a Latin inscription carved in light blue glass: BIBE VIVAS MVLTIS ANNIS (Drink and may you live many years), a convivial acclamation that, according to Filippo Buonarroti, the Romans were accustomed to carve on banquet cups.

== History ==
The cup was probably realized by a specialized workshop in the vicinity of Milan, then capital of the Roman Empire, during the 4th century AD. It was part of a funerary trousseau discovered on 9 June 1675 in a sarcophagus in between the comuni of Mandello Vitta and Castellazzo Novarese, near Novara, Piedmont. After the death of its first owner, Everardo Visconti, the cup was sold to Abbot Carlo Trivulzio, a learned collector of ancient artifacts who, recognizing its value, purchased it in 1777.

The object acquired immediate fame after being described in the Italian edition of Johann Joachim Winckelmann's History of the Art of Antiquity (1779). The cup had caught the attention of the German scholar who became interested in the manufacture techniques of cage cups. The cup was purchased by the Municipality of Milan in 1935 and it is currently displayed at the Archaeological Museum, Milan.

== Bibliography ==
- Winckelmann, Johann Joachim (1779). Storia delle arti del disegno presso gli antichi. Vol. 1. Milan: Imperial Monistero di S. Ambrogio Maggiore.
- Bossi Visconti, Luigi (1807). Observations sur le vase que l'on conservait à Gênes sous le nom de Sacro Catino (in French). Translated by Aubin-Louis Millin de Grandmaison. Turin: Jean Giossi.
- Romussi, Carlo (1912). Milano ne' suoi monumenti. Vol. 1 (3rd ed.). Milan: Sonzogno. pp. 130–132.
- Bertolone, Mario (1947–1948). "La tazza vitrea diatreta Cagnola". Rivista archeologica della antica Provincia e Diocesi di Como. 128–129: 31–35.
- Whitehouse, David (1994). "DIATRETI, Vasi". Enciclopedia dell'Arte Antica. Rome: Istituto dell'Enciclopedia Italiana.
- Aquaro, Peppe (5 March 2004). "La Coppa Trivulzio, Merletto di Vetro". Corriere della Sera. p. 57.
- Buonopane, Alfredo (2016). "La prima edizione della "coppa Trivulzio" con alcune osservazioni in margine a CIL, V, 6532 e Pais, Supplementa Italica, 1083,2". I mille volti del passato Scritti in onore di Francesca Ghedini (in Italian). Rome: Quasar. pp. 817–824. ISBN 978-88-7140-731-9.
