= Purple of Cassius =

Purple inorganic pigment

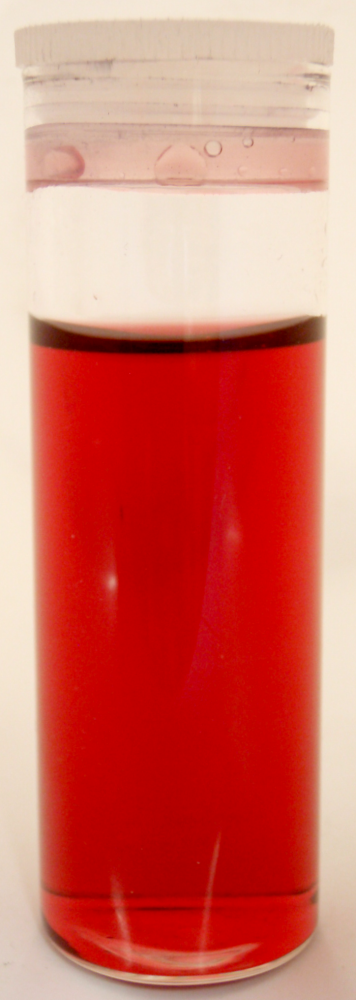
Aqueous colloidal gold.

Purple of Cassius is a purple pigment formed by the reaction of gold salts with tin(II) chloride. It has been used to impart glass with a red coloration (see cranberry glass), as well as to determine the presence of gold as a chemical test.

Generally, the preparation of this material involves gold being dissolved in aqua regia, then reacted with a solution of tin(II) chloride. The tin(II) chloride reduces the chloroauric acid from the dissolution of gold in aqua regia to a colloid of elemental gold supported on tin dioxide to give a purple precipitate or coloration.

When used as a test, the intensity of the color correlates with the concentration of gold present. This test was first observed and refined by a German physician and alchemist, Andreas Cassius (1600–1676) of Hamburg, in 1665. Berzelius later made a detailed study of the purple of Cassius. The colour also attracted attention from Michael Faraday.

Richard Adolf Zsigmondy, who earned the 1926 Nobel Prize for chemistry, says that "Several of the red gold divisions prepared with formaldehyde as well as those reduced with phosphorus appeared perfectly clear in ordinary daylight (like good red wine). They did not settle out their gold, and I was therefore able to call them rightly chemical solutions. In Thomas Graham’s dialysis, however, they behaved like colloidal suspensions: the gold particles did not pass through the parchment membrane. This showed my gold divisions their proper place, namely, that they belonged to the colloidal suspensions."

Recently, a new way for production of the pigment SiO2:AuNPs by using heating of sol-gel composites has been proposed. The physicochemical procedure, used for preparation of the pigment, allows also the production of a weak purple color, arising from cristobalite doped with AuNPs. The optical properties of the composites are explained by the theory of Gustav Mie.
