= Lycurgus Cup =

Roman glass cup

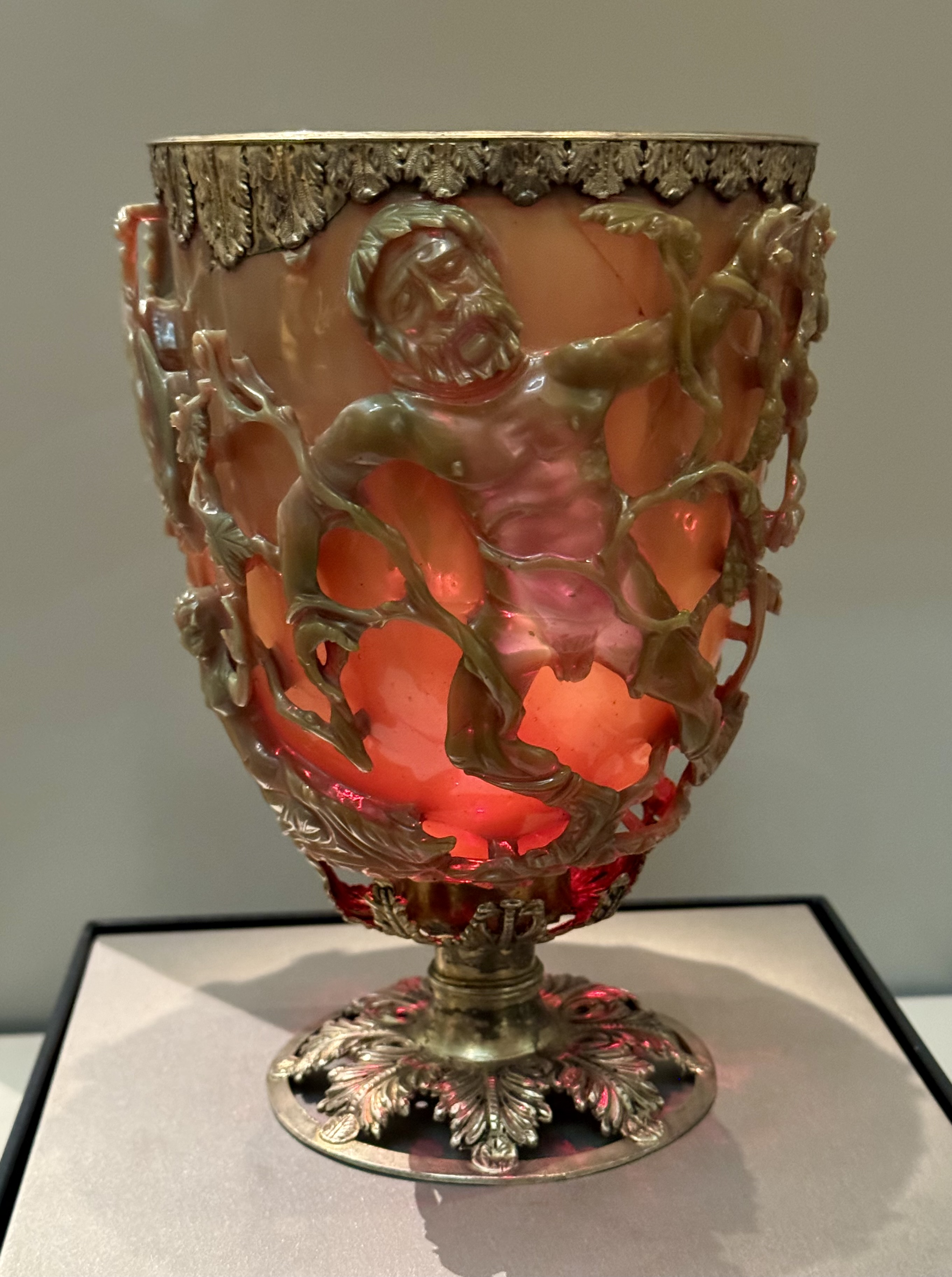
- Appearance when back-lit
- Material: Glass, dichroic, later gilt-silver ornament mounted to rim and foot
- Size: Height: 15.9 cm (6.3 in); Width: 13.2 cm (5.2 in)
- Weight: 700 g (1.5 lb)
- Created: 4th century CE
- Period/culture: Late Roman
- Present location: British Museum, Room 41
- Identification: 1958,1202.1

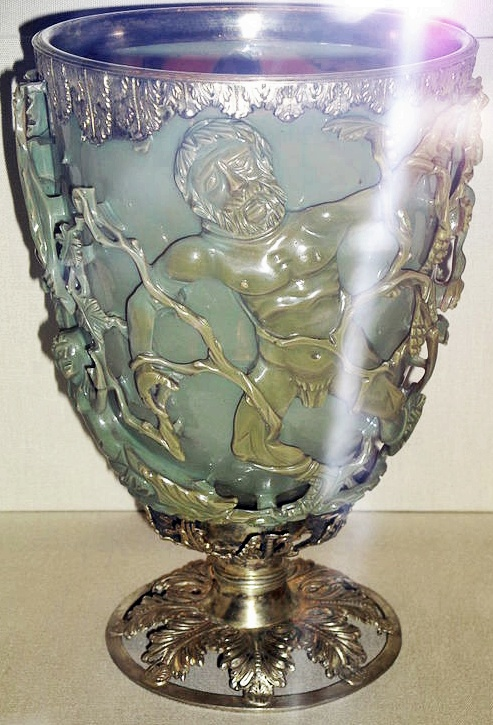
When viewed in reflected light, as in this flash photograph, the cup's dichroic glass is green in colour, whereas when viewed in transmitted light, the glass appears red.

The Lycurgus Cup is a Roman glass 4th-century cage cup made of a dichroic glass, which shows a different colour depending on whether or not light is passing through it: red when lit from behind and green when lit from in front. It is the only complete Roman glass object made from this type of glass, and the one exhibiting the most impressive change in colour; it has been described as "the most spectacular glass of the period, fittingly decorated, which we know to have existed".

The cup is also a very rare example of a complete Roman cage-cup, or diatretum, where the glass has been painstakingly cut and ground back to leave only a decorative "cage" at the original surface-level. Many parts of the cage have been completely undercut. Most cage-cups have a cage with a geometric abstract design, but here there is a composition with figures, showing the mythical King Lycurgus, who (depending on the version) tried to kill Ambrosia, a follower of the god Dionysus (Bacchus to the Romans). She was transformed into a vine that twined around the enraged king and restrained him, eventually killing him. Dionysus and two followers are shown taunting the king. The cup is the "only well-preserved figural example" of a cage cup.

The dichroic effect is achieved by making the glass with tiny proportions of nanoparticles of gold and silver dispersed in colloidal form throughout the glass material. The process used remains unclear, and it is likely that it was not well understood or controlled by the makers, and was probably discovered by accidental "contamination" with minutely ground gold and silver dust. The glass-makers may not even have known that gold was involved, as the quantities involved are so tiny; they may have come from a small proportion of gold in any silver added (most Roman silver contains small proportions of gold), or from traces of gold or gold leaf left by accident in the workshop, as residue on tools, or from other work. The very few other surviving fragments of Roman dichroic glass vary considerably in their two colours.

== The glass ==
It is estimated that to a conventionally composed Roman glass flux 330 parts per million of silver and 40 of gold were added: "These particles were precipitated as colloids and form a silver-gold alloy. When viewed in reflected light the minute metallic particles are just coarse enough to reflect enough of the light without eliminating the transmission. In transmitted light the fine particles scatter the blue end of the spectrum more effectively than the red end, resulting in red transmission, and this is the colour observed. Since it is impossible that the Roman artisans managed to add these incredibly low levels of silver and gold to the volume of the glass used to make the vessel deliberately, the levels were probably added at higher levels to a larger volume of glass-melt, and increasingly diluted by adding more glass." The particles are only about 70 nanometers across, and embedded in the glass, so they cannot be seen by optical microscopy, and a transmission electron microscope is needed instead. At this size they approach the size of the wavelengths of visible light, and a surface plasmon resonance effect takes place.

The interior of the cup is mostly smooth, but behind the main figures the glass has been hollowed out, well beyond even the main outer surface, so that they are of similar thickness to the main outer surface, giving an even colour when light passes through. This is a feature unique among surviving cups; Harden suggests they were an "afterthought". An area around the torso of Lycurgus is a rather different colour from the rest of the glass; perhaps an accident of manufacture, but one exploited by the glass-cutter "so that he could make Lycurgus's rage glow even more strongly". After the very lengthy cutting stage the fine polished appearance was achieved by a process called "flame polishing" that risked the complete loss of the object. A suggestion in 1995 that in fact this and other cage cups used a mixture of moulding and cutting has met with little acceptance.

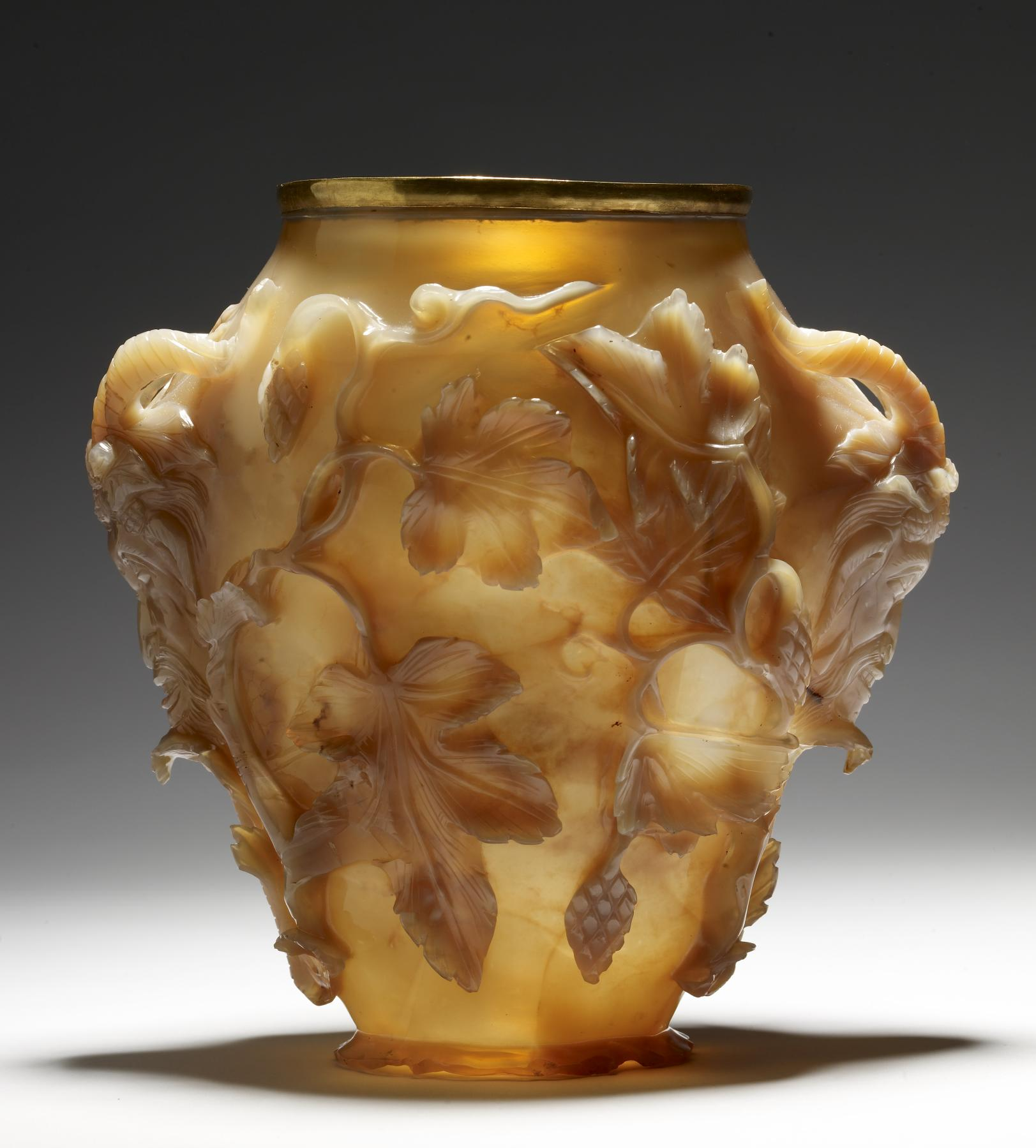
The Rubens Vase, an agate hardstone carving of c. A.D. 400

Like the British Museum's other spectacular work in Roman glass, the cameo glass Portland Vase, the cup represents to some extent the extension of skills developed by cutters of engraved gems, or the larger hardstone carving of vessels in semi-precious stones, which were luxury arts with enormous prestige in ancient Rome. No carved gemstone vessels directly comparable to either work are known, but the general taste behind these extreme exhibitions of glass-making skill is one formed by objects in natural stones like the Coupe des Ptolémées or the Rubens Vase. Indeed, it was not until the first full studies of the cup in 1950 that it was established for certain that the material was glass and not a gemstone, which had previously been in question.

It seems likely that as many as three separate workshops or factories were involved in the production of the cup, perhaps not in the same part of the Empire. The glass may have been initially made in a large block of standard clear glass, perhaps in Egypt or Palestine, which both exported great quantities of glass for forming, and sometimes colouring, elsewhere. The thick "blank" dichroic vessel was probably made by one specialist workshop and passed to another consisting of specialist cutters. This would certainly have been a rare and highly expensive object, and the secrets of its manufacture, possibly not well understood even by its makers, seem only to have been used for about a century.

There are various small losses, of which the face of the panther is the most significant, and the cup is cracked; the British Museum has never removed the metal rim for this reason. The base or foot of the cup is damaged, and the original form of the base uncertain. The Metropolitan Museum of Art, in New York, has a fragment measuring 2 3/16 in × 3 in (56 mm × 76 mm) of a satyr from a dichroic cage cup that turns from olive green to "reddish amber".

=== Modern recreations ===
Corning Glass Works has reproduced a blank of a material of similar chemical composition and internal structure, which displays under reflected and transmitted light the same "Lycurgus effect" of green to red colour change as the Lycurgus cup material does. Cranberry glass or gold ruby glass is somewhat similar and far more common, manufactured with colloidal gold, but this only ever shows a red colour.

In 2020, researchers from the Netherlands reproduced the green/red dichroic effect in a 3D printable nanocomposite material. As with the original Lycurgus cup, this effect is due to small amounts of silver and gold nanoparticles, of the proper size and shapes, embedded in the 3D printable material.

In 2026 scientists from the University of Sheffield replicated the process, allowing them to commission a glass artist to bring the effect to life in a contemporary glass sculpture based on the Lycurgus Cup and the Farnese Atlas.

== Iconography ==
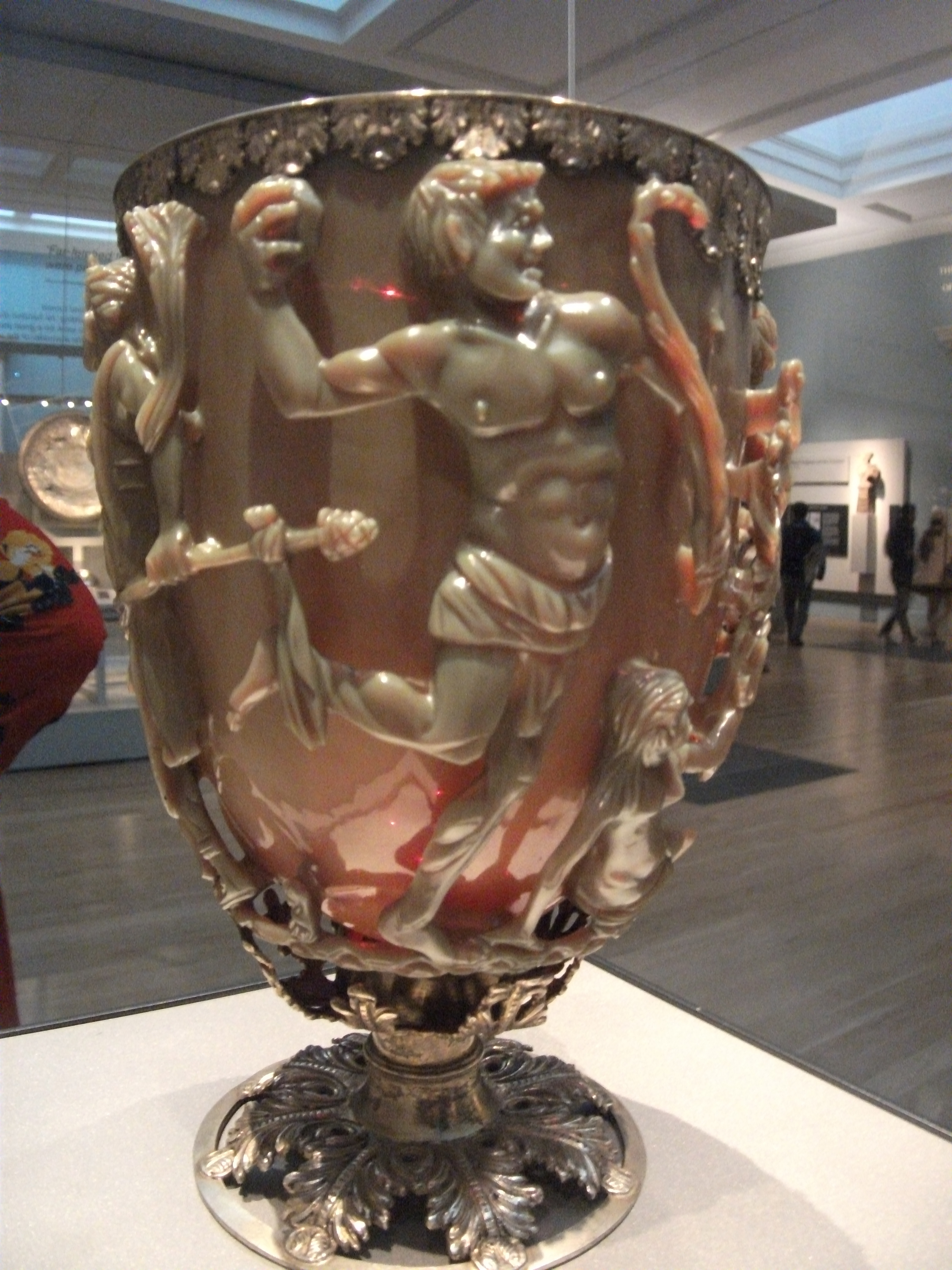
The satyr with the rock, in the new 2014 display

The figure of Lycurgus, bound by the vine and naked apart from boots, is flanked on the left by a crouching Ambrosia, at a considerably smaller scale. Behind her one of Dionysus's satyrs (shown with a normal human form) stands on one foot as he prepares to hurl a large rock at Lycurgus. In his other hand he holds a pedum or shepherd's crook. To the right of Lycurgus comes first a figure of Pan, then at his feet a rather canine-looking panther, the traditional companion of Dionysus, whose face is missing but was presumably snapping at the king, and then the god himself, taunting him with his right arm extended in an angry gesture. Dionysus carries a thyrsus, the special staff of the god and his followers, and his dress has an Eastern, perhaps Indian, flavour, reflecting what the Ancient Greeks generally believed (perhaps wrongly) about the origins of his cult. The calf section of one leg has been lost. A streamer hanging behind him from his thyrsus overlaps the raised foot of the satyr with the rock, completing the circle of the cup.

It has been suggested that this not very common scene was a reference to the defeat in 324 by the Emperor Constantine I of his co-emperor Licinius, who was killed in 325 after a period under close guard. Another suggestion is that the colour change from green to red was understood as evoking the ripening of red grapes, so that there was a particular suitability in depicting a scene with the god of wine. The cup may have been intended for use at Bacchic cult celebrations, still very much a feature of Roman religious life around 300. A letter supposedly from the Emperor Hadrian (d. 138) to his brother-in-law Servianus, quoted in a biography in the Historia Augusta, records the gift of two dichroic cups, which the 4th-century author had seen: "I have sent you particoloured cups that change colour, presented to me by the priest of a temple. They are specially dedicated to you and my sister. I would like you to use them at banquets on feast days."

Other depictions of the story tend to either depict Lycurgus attacking Ambrosia, often with a double-headed axe, while her companions rush to her aid, or Lycurgus alone, entangled in the vine. The closest parallel to the scene on the cup is one of the apse mosaics in the triconch triclinium at the Villa del Casale, Piazza Armerina, which may also refer to Licinius. There is also a mosaic at Antioch on the Orontes, and a group on a 2nd-century sarcophagus at the Villa Parisi in Frascati. There is also a floor-mosaic from Vienne, now in the museum at Saint-Romain-en-Gal, with Lycurgus alone inside the vine. The preceding scene of Lycurgus attacking Ambrosia, is on a floor-mosaic at Brading Roman Villa on the Isle of Wight. Of this and similar mosaics, Martin Henig says: "In cases such as this, we are not concerned with simple, popular paganism but with recondite knowledge. This is the sort of esoteric religion which the Emperor Julian, Symmachus, Praetextatus, Macrobius and Proclus relished. The religious thought behind these floors is probably deeper and more complex than contemporary Christianity and many of the keys to understanding it have been lost."

The cup was probably designed for drinking from at feasts, or more specifically Bacchic cult celebrations, where the lack of a foot, also a feature found in other cage-cups, may mean it was passed around, as elaborate cups often were in medieval cultures. Alternatively other cage cups were almost certainly used, suspended, as oil lamps, where the dichroic effect of this cup would show to advantage.

== History ==
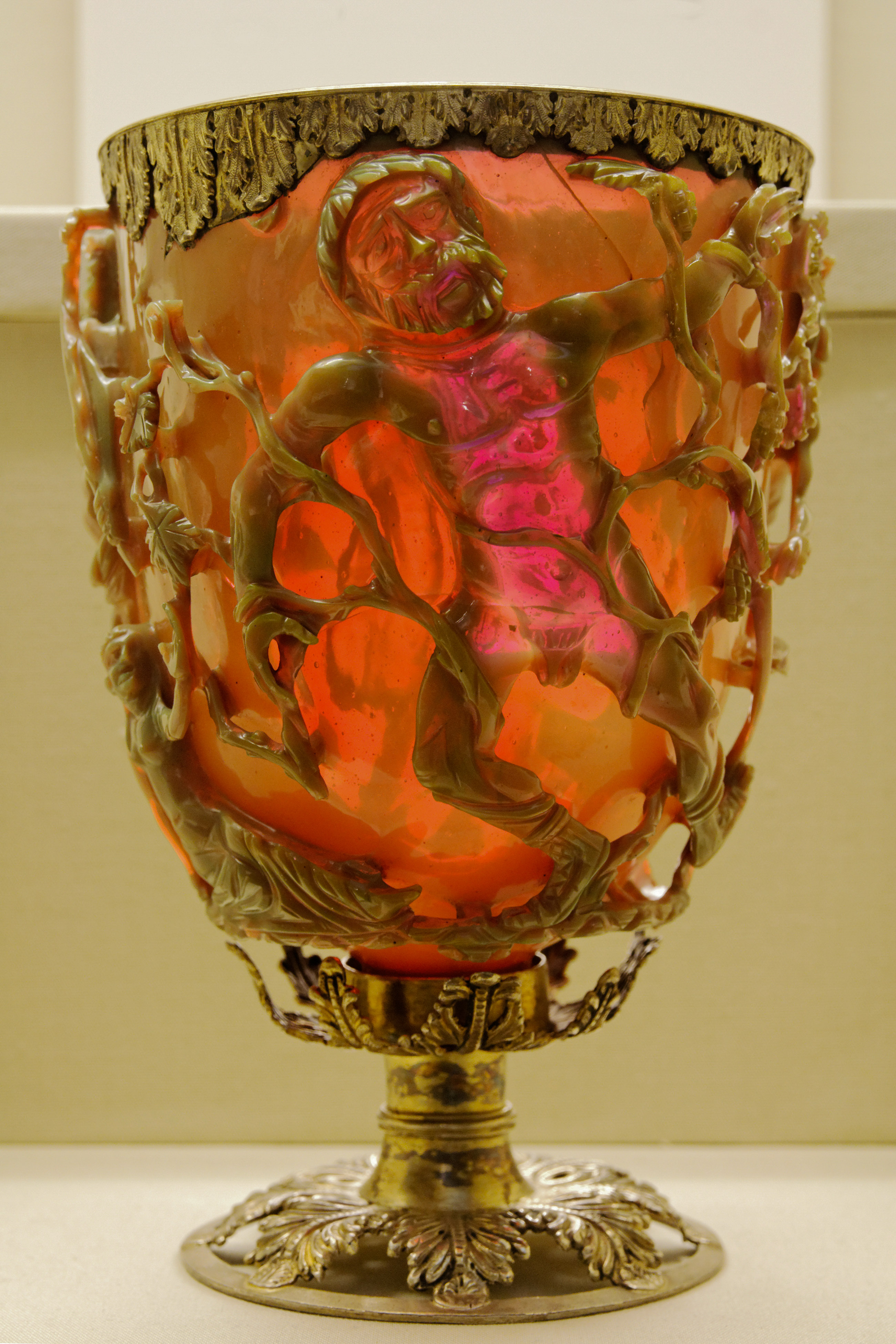
A view showing parts in both colours, and the variation in the red

The cup was "perhaps made in Alexandria" or Rome in about 290–325 AD, and measures 16.5 cm × 13.2 cm (6.5 in × 5.2 in). From its excellent condition it is probable that, like several other luxury Roman objects, it has always been preserved above ground; most often such objects ended up in the relatively secure environment of a church treasury. Alternatively it might, like several other cage cups, have been recovered from a sarcophagus. The present gilt-bronze rim and foot were added in about 1800, suggesting it was one of the many objects taken from church treasuries during the period of the French Revolution and French Revolutionary Wars. The foot continues the theme of the cup with open-work vine leaves, and the rim has leaf forms that lengthen and shorten to match the scenes in glass. In 1958 the foot was removed by British Museum conservators, and not rejoined to the cup until 1973. There may well have been earlier mounts.

The early history of the cup is unknown, and it is first mentioned in print in 1845, when a French writer said he had seen it "some years ago, in the hands of M. Dubois". This is probably shortly before it was acquired by the Rothschild family. Certainly Lionel de Rothschild owned it by 1857, when the touring Gustav Friedrich Waagen saw it in his collection and described it as "barbaric and debased". In 1862 Lionel lent it to an exhibition at what is now the Victoria and Albert Museum, after which it virtually fell from scholarly view until 1950. In 1958, Victor, Lord Rothschild sold it to the British Museum for £20,000, £2,000 of which was donated by the Art Fund (then the NACF).

The cup forms part of the museum's Department of Prehistory and Europe rather than the Greece and Rome Department, and was previously on display, lit from behind, in Room 50. In 2015 it was on display with the new display of the Rothschild donation of the Waddesdon Bequest in Room 2A, with a changing internal lighting source that shows the colour change very effectively, though only one side of the cup can be seen. By October 2015 it was back in the re-opened Room 41.

While Room 41, where it was then displayed, was closed for refurbishment, from November 2012 to August 2013 it was on display with other British Museum pieces at the Art Institute of Chicago's Jaharis Galleries of Greek, Roman and Byzantine Art, where it was very effectively displayed in a free-standing case, lit from above with changing light so that the colour change was clearly visible. It is considered able to travel to important exhibitions and in 2008 was exhibited in "Reflecting Antiquity, Modern Glass Inspired by Ancient Rome" at the Corning Museum of Glass in Corning, New York, in 2003 at the Hayward Gallery in London in "'Saved! 100 Years of the National Art Collections Fund", and in 1987 in "Glass of the Caesars" in the British Museum, Cologne, Milan, and Rome.
