= Conchylia cup =

Type of Roman cup

A conchylia cup is an Ancient Roman glass cup type with a conical base and a slightly everted rim, made of transparent to slightly colored glass. Its distinguishing characteristics are stylized open mouthed fish with indented fins and curving tails, often made of translucent glass and applied wavy colored threads, and affixed to the outer surface of the cup to produce its three-dimensional aspect. The most common type appears to have stylized fish swimming to the left. These vases could be entirely free-blown or their cup shape mold-blown, and the fish, or other sea creatures, free-blown onto it.

The only four intact conchylia cups were found in Cologne, Trier, and Rome. Both Cologne and Trier have been suggested as manufacturing centers. Fish appliqués have been found throughout the Mediterranean, and provide no good clues for provenance. These cups were possibly used either as oil lamps, drinking vessels or for holding garum sauce. The most current thinking is that they were oil lamps, based on stylistic comparison with a cage cup from Szekszard, Hungary, but may not be an entirely satisfactory answer, given that there seems to be no practical way of placing a wick in the cup. The only cup stemming from a datable context is from Cologne, and dated to the fourth century AD. It is now in the Römisch-Germanisches Museum, Cologne.
