= Cage cup =

Luxury Late Roman glass vessel type

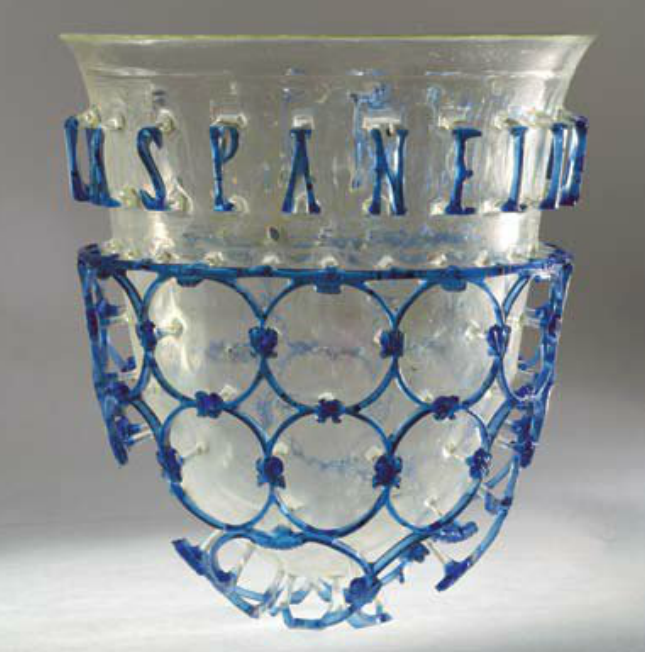
4th century cup in the Heritage Museum Pljevlja, Montenegro with smooth joins

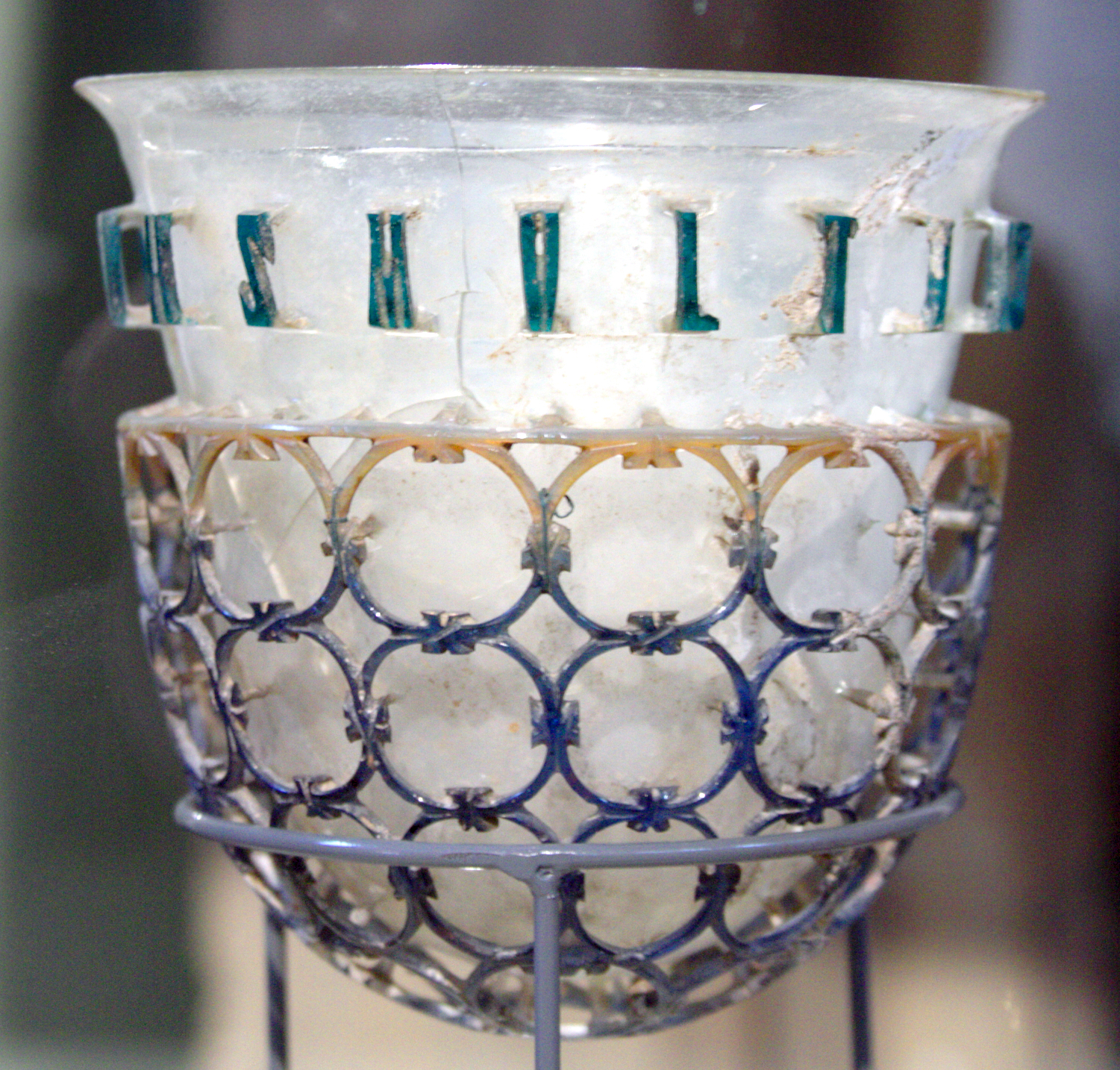
The Milan cage cup, 4th century

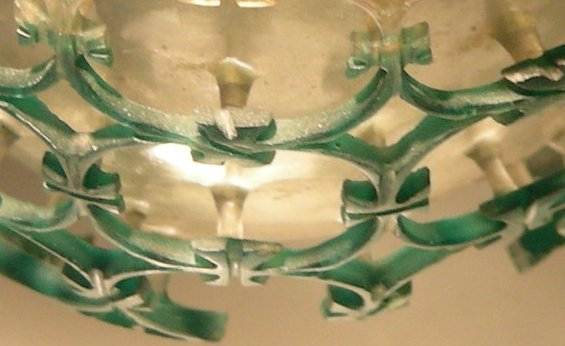
Cologne cage cup from the 4th century; seen from above, the smooth joins of the cage to the cup are argued to distinguish them from the carving of the rim and the cage.

A cage cup, also vas diatretum, plural diatreta, or "reticulated cup" is a type of luxury late Roman glass vessel, found from roughly the 4th century, and "the pinnacle of Roman achievements in glass-making". Diatreta consist of an inner beaker and an outer cage or shell of decoration that stands out from the body of the cup, to which it is attached by short stems or shanks. About fifty cups or, more often, fragments have survived, and there are only a few in near-complete condition. Most have a cage with circular geometrical patterns, often with an "inscription", or phrase in letters above the reticulated area as well. Some have a flange, or zone of projecting open-cut moulding, above the lower patterns and below the lettering (only illustrated here by the Cologne cup in the gallery).

Even rarer are examples with scenes with figures, of which the Lycurgus Cup in the British Museum is the only complete example to survive, though there are other fragments. In this the rest of the "cage" is made up of a vine that entraps Lycurgus. None have a foot. All were clearly difficult to make, and no doubt very expensive, like the other spectacular type of luxury Roman glass, cameo glass objects such as the Portland Vase. Both the technology used to make them and the way they were used are still the subject of some debate among specialists.

== Technology ==
Cage cups, diatreta, are mentioned in Roman literature, and the dates assigned to examples (not necessarily by the same people) range from around the mid-third to the mid-4th century, at the same time as the late Roman cameo glass vessels. They appear to have been made of similar glasses, and there is also evidence that some late vessels may have been combinations of cameo and cage-cup techniques. The main division is between cups with figures, whether or not accompanied by reticulated patterns, and those without. Some have inscriptions and flanges with ovolo decoration; others do not. Most have a narrow beaker shape, but others a wider bowl-like one.

Since the first publication on the subject in 1680 it has mostly been accepted that the cage cups were made by cutting and grinding a blank vessel of solid thick glass, a laborious technique at which the Greeks and Romans were very experienced from their passion for hardstone carvings and engraved gems in semi-precious stones. An alternative theory, once rejected but recently revived, suggests that this is only true of the rim of the vessels and the cutting of the fixed cage, but not for the joining of beaker and its cage; these would have been made separately and fused when hot. For example, it is claimed that the smooth joins on the Munich cup show the fusion of the cage to the main cup, though the cage itself is carved. These smooth joins also show the Cologne and Pljevlja cups above. This remains controversial, and a fragmentary cup found in Corinth in the 1960s is said to show no evidence of joints where the cage meets the main cup when examined under a microscope. Also, the German experimental archaeologist and glass engraver Josef Wenzel has reproduced several historical cage cups, including the Cologne cup, by first shaping a massive cup, adding the coloured glass on the outside as thick bands and plates, then carving them out, as this technology was widespread in the Rhine area, where it was used for gemstone cutting.

Apart from carved gems, a small fragment of an openwork pattern in reticulated silver has survived in a large hoard of Roman silver chopped up in the 5th century as bullion, and buried in Scotland at Traprain Law, now in the Royal Museum of Scotland. The fragment shows a pattern based on circles, that is very similar to the glass diatreta, suggesting that the same style may have been used in silver plate, though which came first is unknown.

Some examples add difficulty to the manufacturing process by using different colours on the cage, like the Milan and Cologne cups, but most are plain glass, like those at Munich and Corning. For the special technology of dichroic glass, which changes colour when light passes through it, see the article on the best example, the Lycurgus Cup.

== Function ==
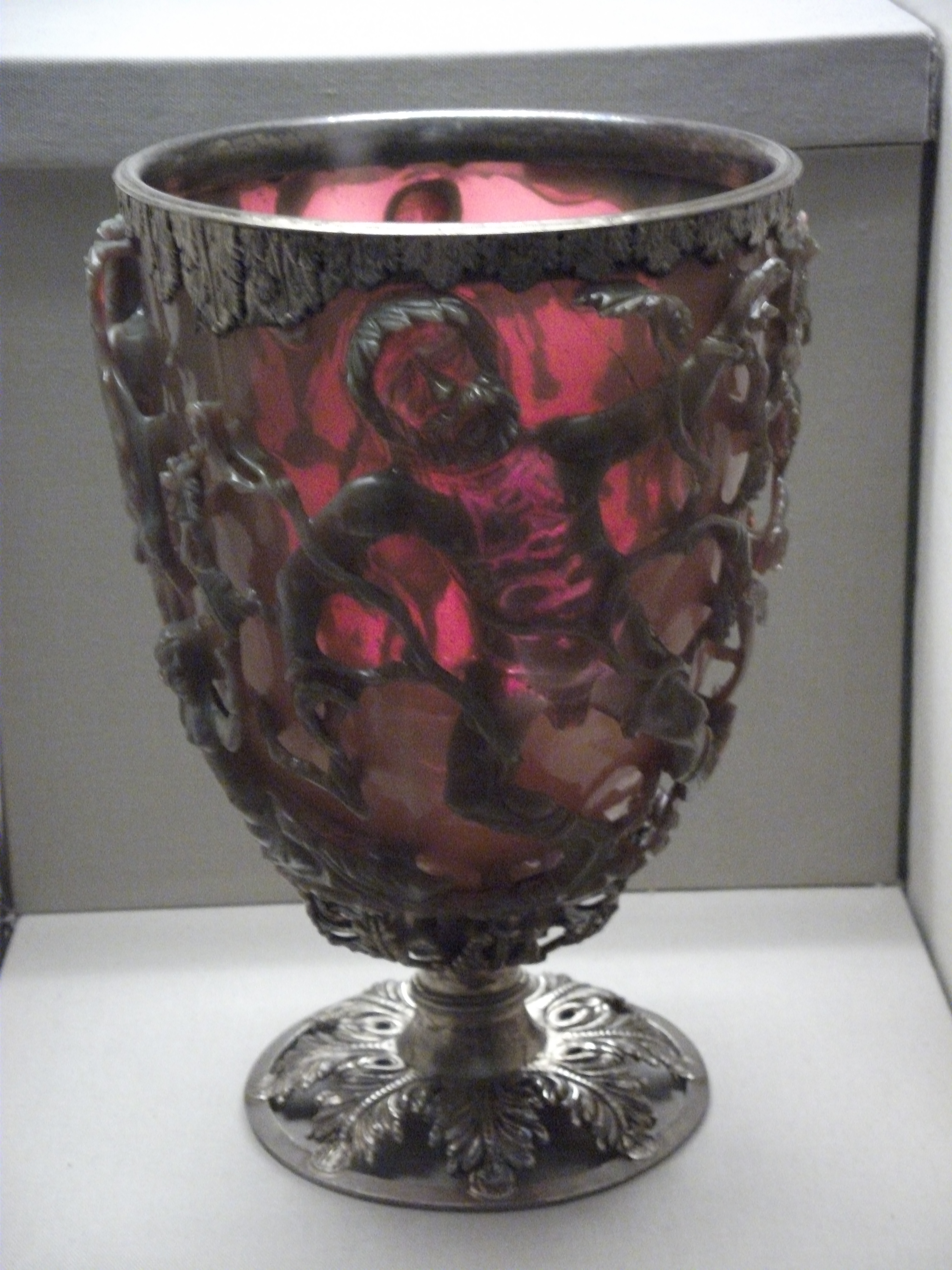
The Lycurgus Cup, lit from behind, with a modern foot and rim.

The function of cage cups is debated. The inscriptions strongly suggest that they were cups to be used, and perhaps passed around, for ceremonial drinking at feasts, but it has been suggested that the shape of the out-turned rim of the beakers and the missing stand of all known vessels means that all diatreta were like the example in the Corning Museum of Glass, which was almost certainly an oil lamp designed to be suspended. The Corning cup was certainly intended for suspension, as the copper alloy fittings were found with it; there is a round band fitting under the rim, and three pieces that are part chain and part rod, leading to a ring and single rod, and a variety of cups for three attachments, very like a hanging basket in modern gardens, and an arrangement known to have been used for lamps by the Romans. The convivial dedications found on several examples are paralleled on the bases on many Roman gold glass cups found mostly in Rome.

The Lycurgus Cup has no out-turned rim, but may have been altered, or fitted with a metal rim like the modern one it has now. Like the Constable-Maxwell cup, the Corning cup is much wider than the other well-known examples, shaped more as a bowl than a cup, though apart from the lack of lettering, otherwise very similar in form to the narrower cups. The cups therefore probably form two groups: a bowl-shaped lamp group with no lettering, and a beaker-shaped group for drinking from, with lettering. Cups for drinking with rounded bottoms, which encourage faster consumption as they must either be held or placed rim down (and empty) on a surface such as a table, are known from various cultures, with for example the modern yard glass, and other types of "shot" glass. It was probably expected that the guests at their lecti triclinares kept the valuable pieces in their hands and, if possible, drank them in one gulp and handed them back to the slave.

== Origin ==
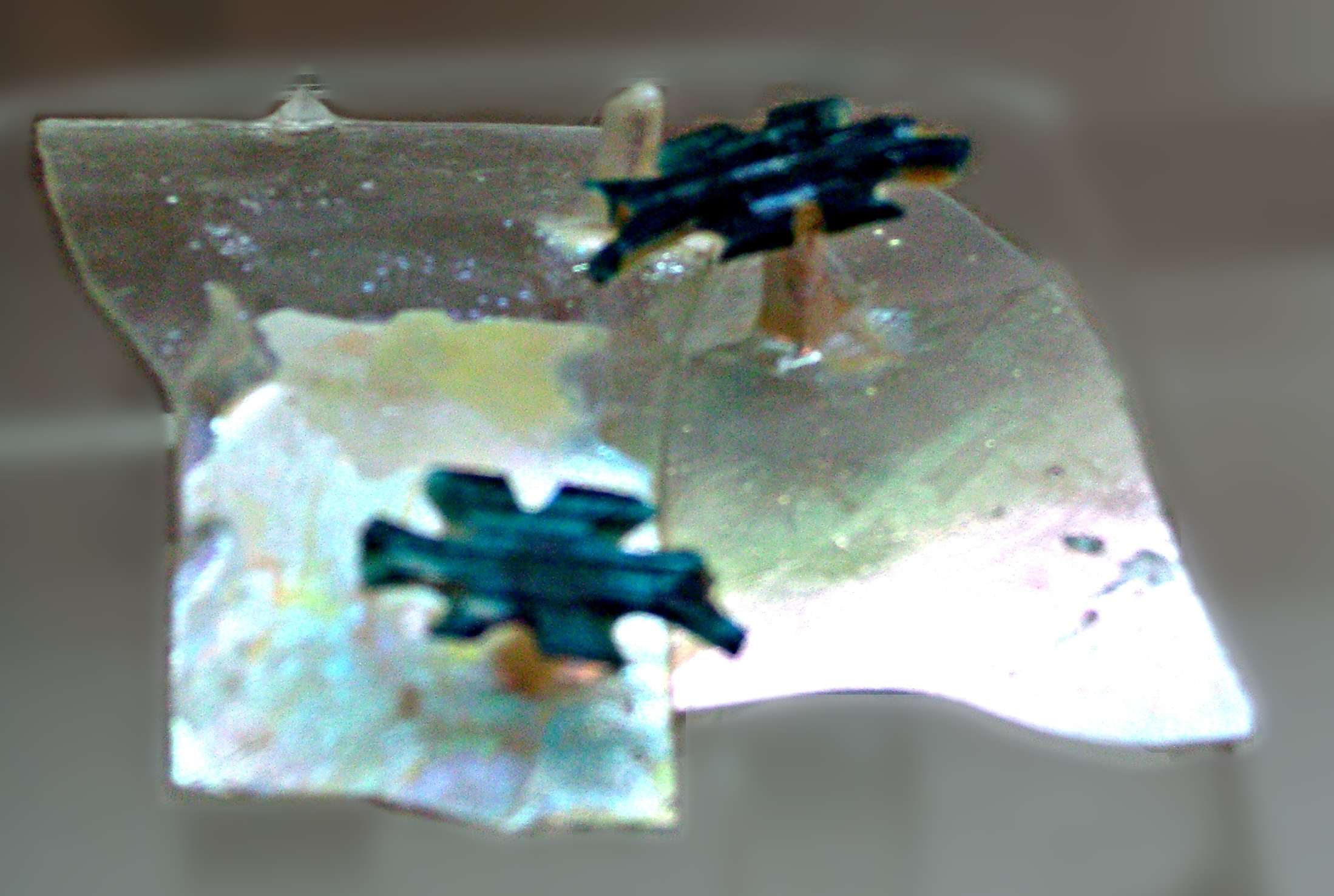
Fragments found in Tunisia, the first from North Africa

Decorative Roman glass of the highest quality tends to be assigned to Rome or Alexandria, the latter mentioned as the source of over-elaborate glass by the 1st century satirist Martial and other sources.

However the majority of finds of diatreta are from Roman sites along the Rhine, or near it, suggesting that they were produced in the area, perhaps at Augusta Treverorum, modern Trier. This was the largest city of Roman Germany and the main residence of Constantine I for many years, coinciding with the period when the cups seem to have been made. Colonia Claudia Ara Agrippinensium, modern Cologne, is another possibility.

Several more recent discoveries, including reputedly both the Corning and Constable-Maxwell cups, have been from the Eastern Empire, so there may have been two centres of production.

== Examples ==
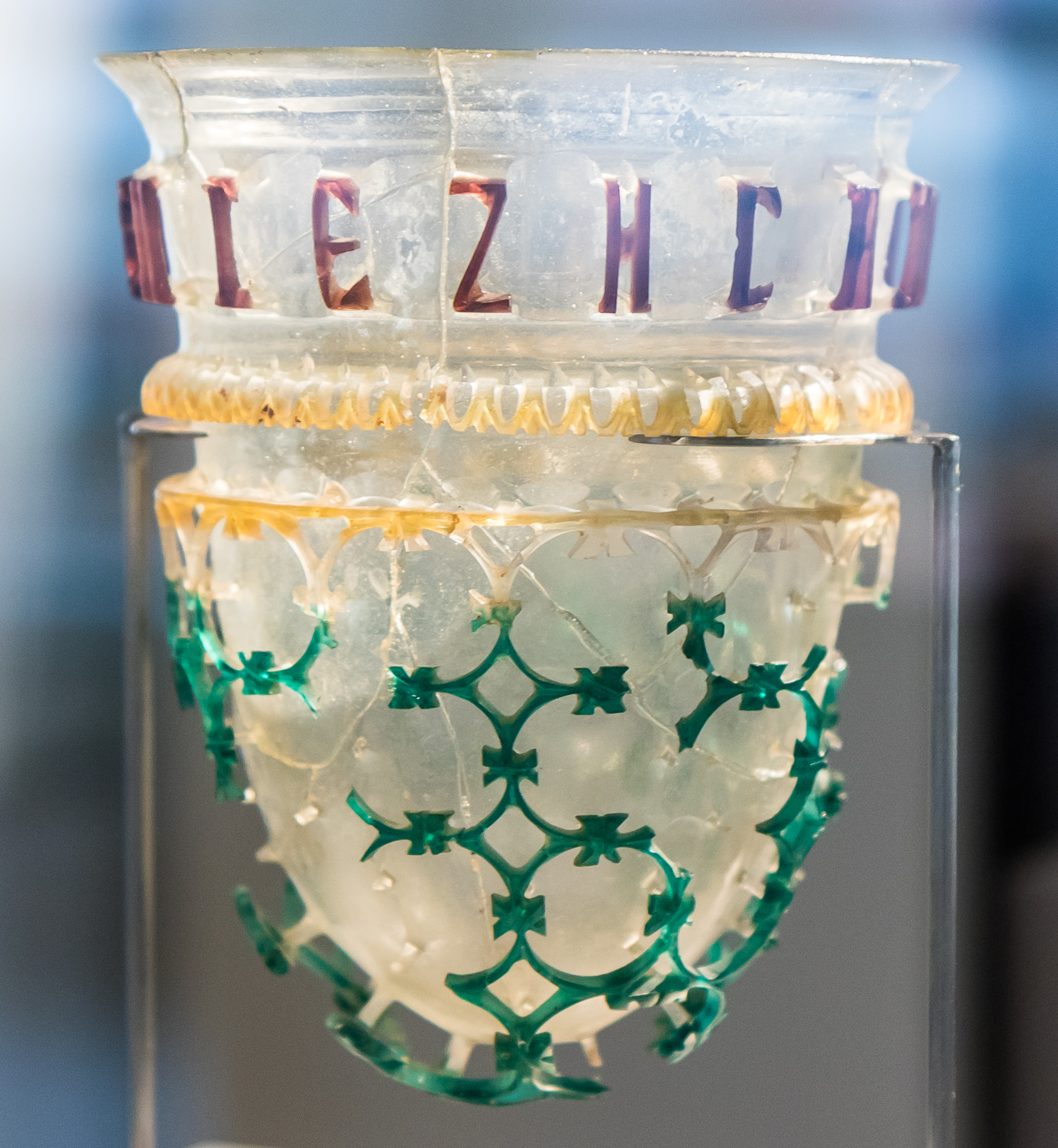
The Cologne cup, 12 cm high

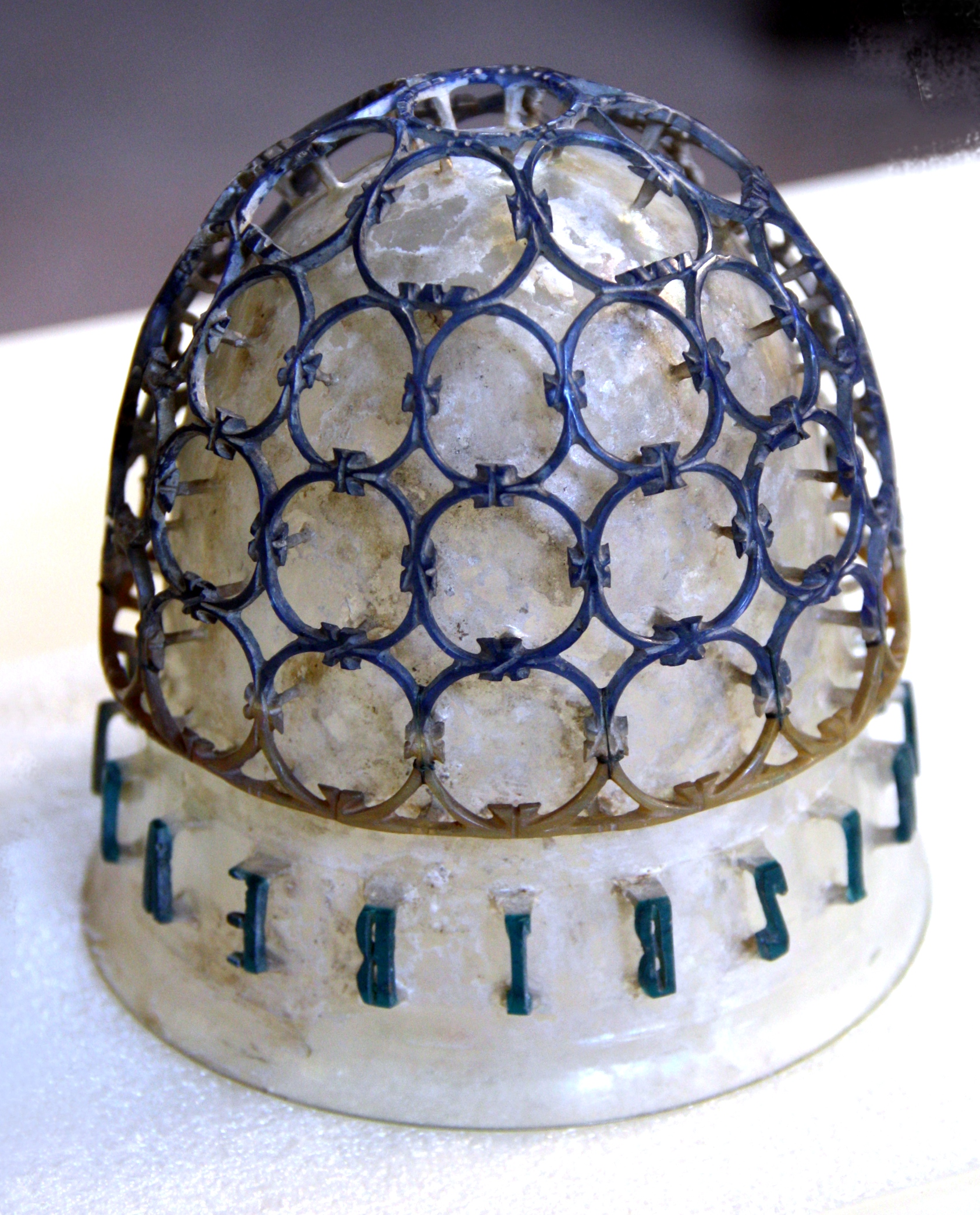
The Coppa diatreta Trivulzio in Milan, seen upside down

These represent most of the best-preserved examples to survive.

Beaker-shaped:

- The Cologne cage cup at the Romano-Germanic Museum in Cologne. Its Greek letters read: ΠΙΕ ΖΗCΑΙC ΚΑΛѠC ΑΕΙ (pie zēsais kalōs aei): "Drink, live well forever." This is somewhat puzzling to archaeologists, as the rest of the grave goods found in the same grave were very mundane.
- The Coppa diatreta Trivulzio at the Museo archeologico Milan, the only example with no damage at all. This has the inscription: BIBE VIVAS MVLTIS ANNIS: "Drink and you will live for many years". It is 4th century, found in the 17th century in a sarcophagus in between the comuni of Mandello Vitta and Castellazzo Novarese (Novara), in the 18th century acquired by Abbot Trivulzio and in 1935 by the city of Milan.
- The Munich Cup in the Munich Staatliche Antikensammlungen, found in Cologne, inscribed BIBE MVLTIS ANNIS, "Drink [and you will live for] many years".
- The Lycurgus Cup; no inscription, but the glass is dichroic, changing colour when lit from behind. Its origins are unknown, but it has probably always been above ground. This is significantly larger than the geometrical beakers, with a height of 158.8 mm (6.25 in).
- The Daruvar "Netzbecher" ("net-beaker") in Vienna, found in 1785 in Daruvar, Croatia, and now in the Kunsthistorisches Museum. The cup was 9.5 cm high, and in pieces, with much missing. It has the letters FAVENTIBVS, an expression of good luck (perhaps short for "Faventibus ventis" – "with favourable winds", a common expression).
- Rheinisches Landesmuseum, Trier, found in 1950 in a sarcophagus at Piesport-Niederemmel, 18 centimetres high with a volume of 1.5 litres.
- The Pljevlja cage cup, found in 1975 at Komini/Komine near the city of Pljevlja in Montenegro; 4th century with a clear body and blue cage and inscription round the rim: VIVAS PANELLENI BONA M ("Live, Panhellenius, in good m[emory]"). It is in the Heritage Museum Pljevlja.
- The Autun cup, a fragmented but complete vas diatretum inscribed VIVAS FELICITER ("Live in Bliss") discovered in 2020 in a IVth century sarcophagus of the necropolis of Saint-Pierre-l’Estrier at Autun, the antique Augustodunum, by an INRAP team and now in the Musée Rolin in Autun. It contained ambergris, the oldest evidence of its aromatic use.
- A fragmented "vase diatretum" excavated in Serdica (Sofia) in 2001 in a Roman sarcophagus of the late 4th century.
- A figurative cup of the treasure of Begram, apparently showing the Pharos of Alexandria, found in a hoard at Bagram and now in the National Museum of Afghanistan in Kabul.
- A fragment excavated in 2009 at the domus dei "Putti danzanti" (villa of the dancing putti) at Aquileia.

Bowl-shaped:

- The Corning Cage Cup, in the Corning Museum of Glass, Corning, New York, a wider bowl than the preceding examples, 7.4 cm high, 12.2 cm wide. Certainly intended for suspension, as the copper alloy fittings were found with it, as described above.
- The Constable-Maxwell cup, a wide example like the Corning cup, 4 in (10 cm) high, 7 1/8 in (18.2 cm) wide. This is still in a private collection, sold in 1979 for c. US$1.2 million to the British Rail Pension Fund, then in 1997 for £2,311,000, and again in 2004 for £2,646,650, a world-record price for a piece of Roman glass.
- The Hohen-Sülzen bowl, most valuable of six glasses found in 1869 in two Roman sarcophagi. Except the Dionysos bottle at the Landesmuseum Mainz, all of them are missing since 1945.
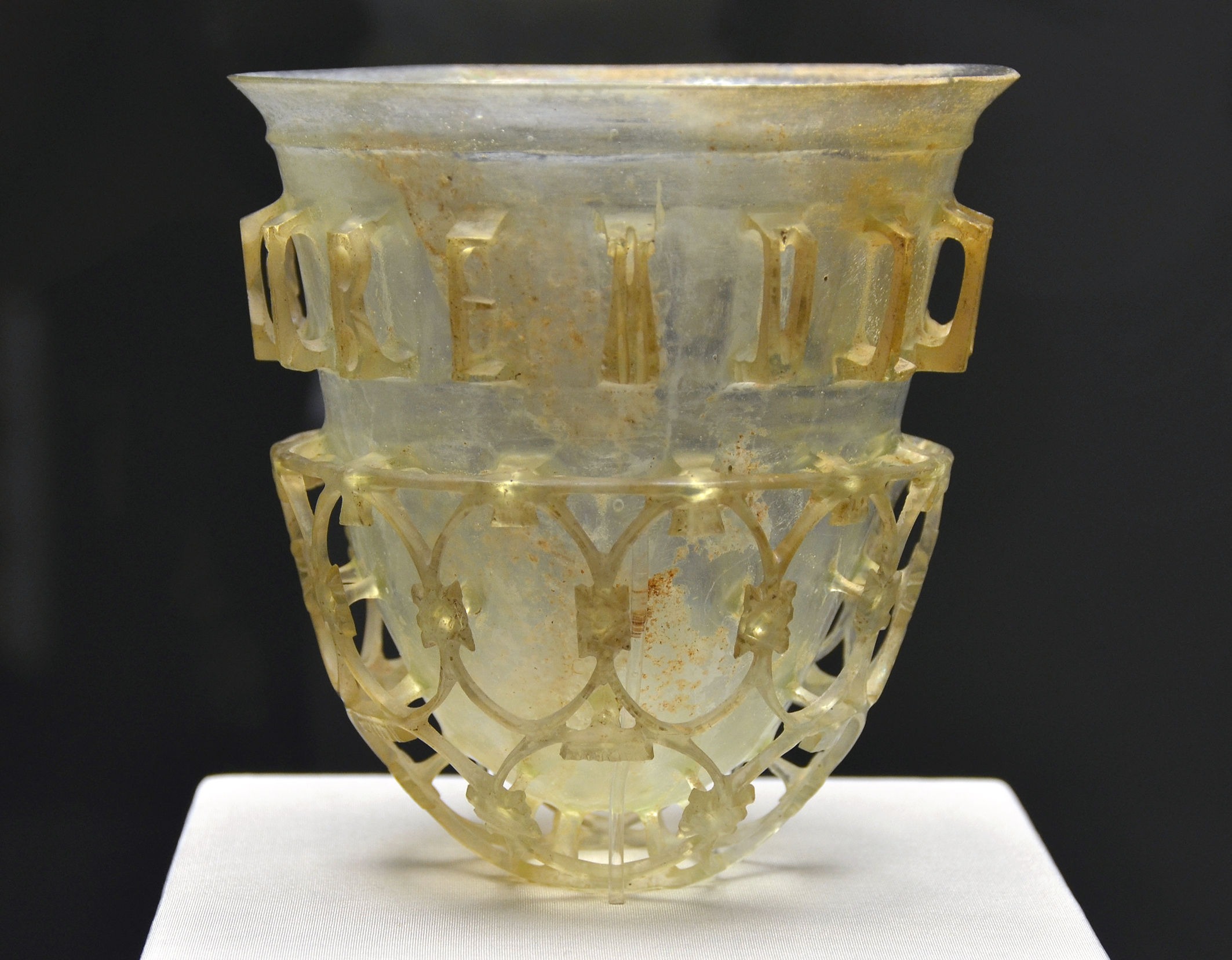
The Munich cup

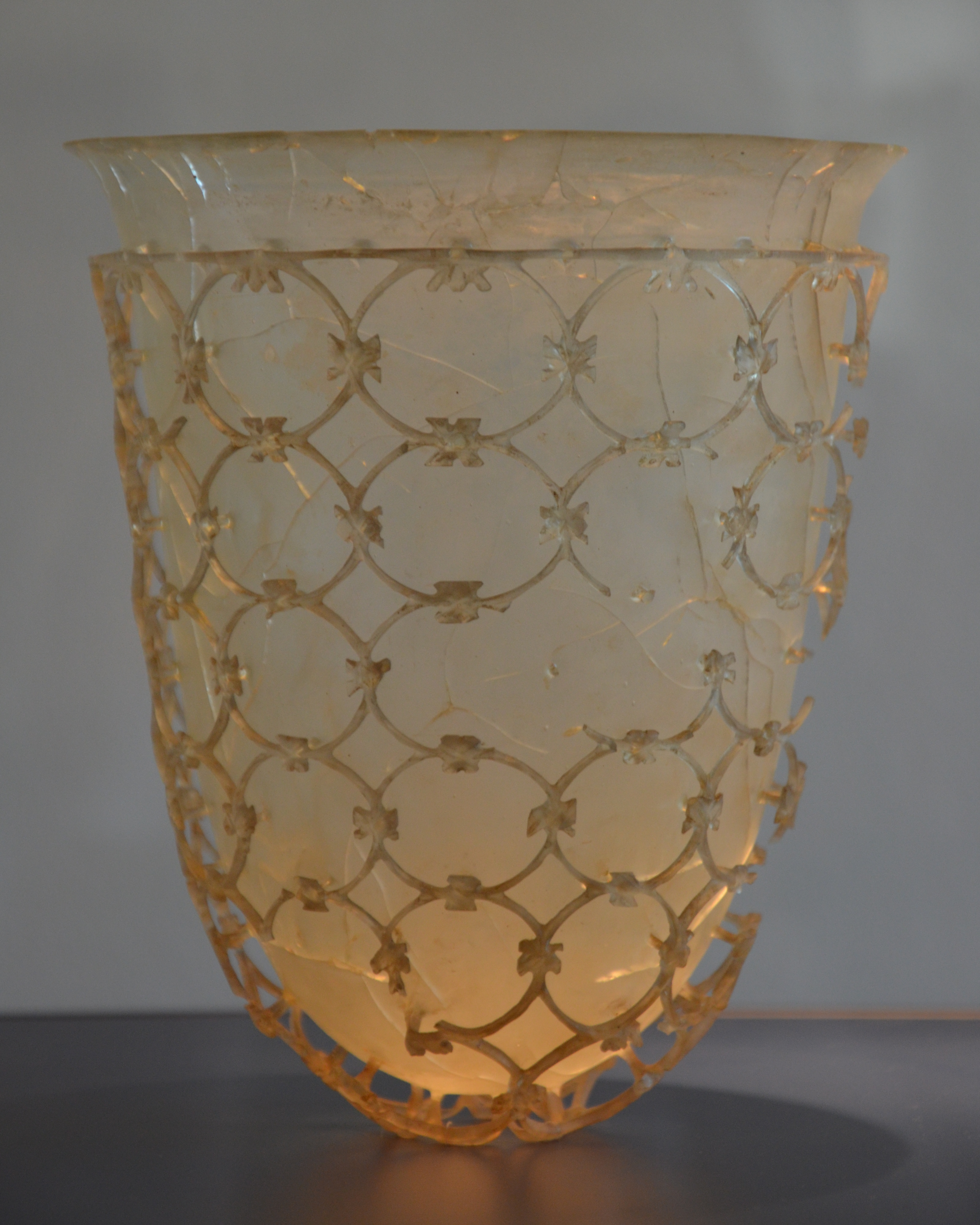
The Piesport-Niederemmel Cup, found in 1950, now in Trier

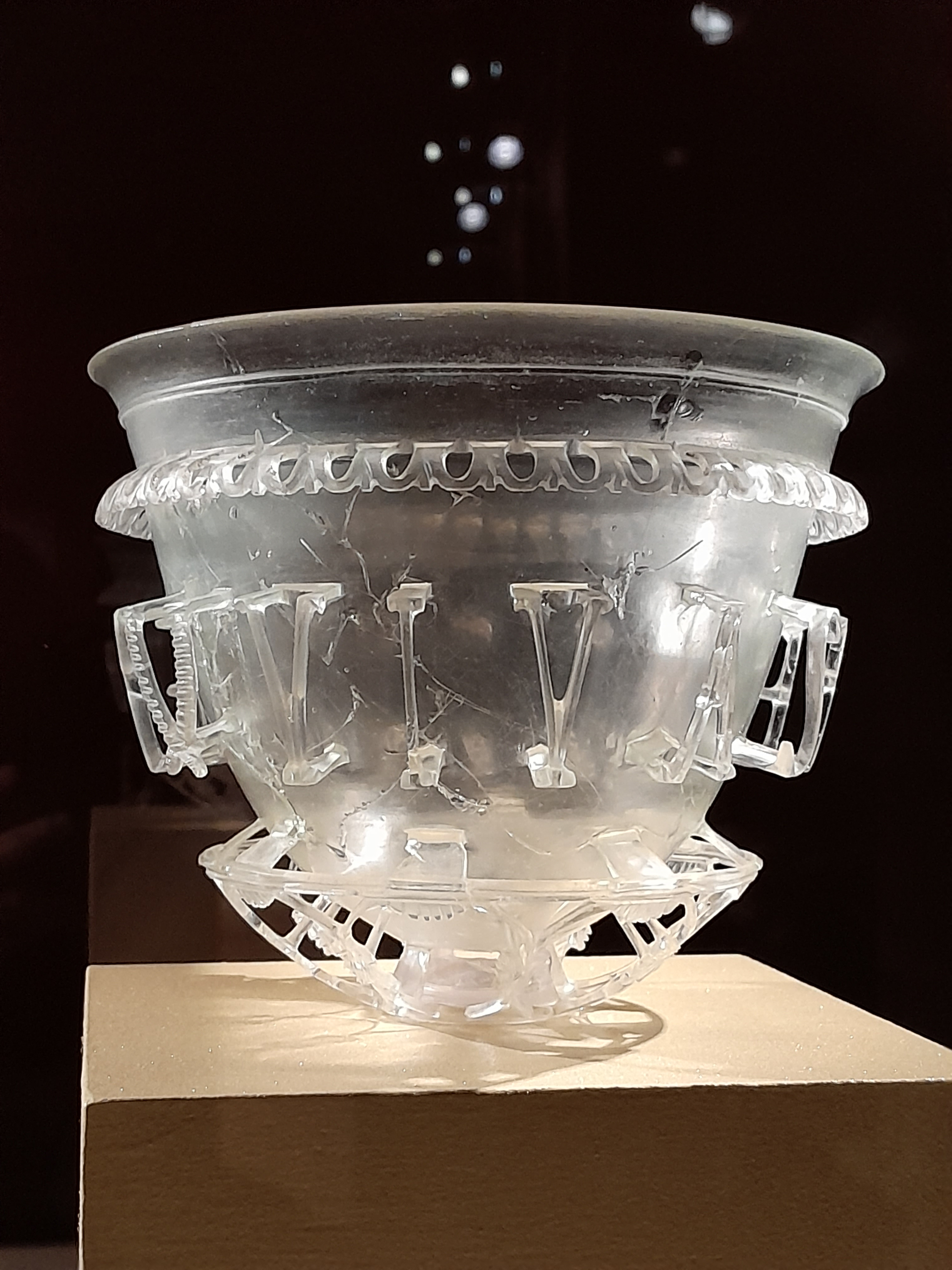
The Autun cup, Musée Rolin, Autun

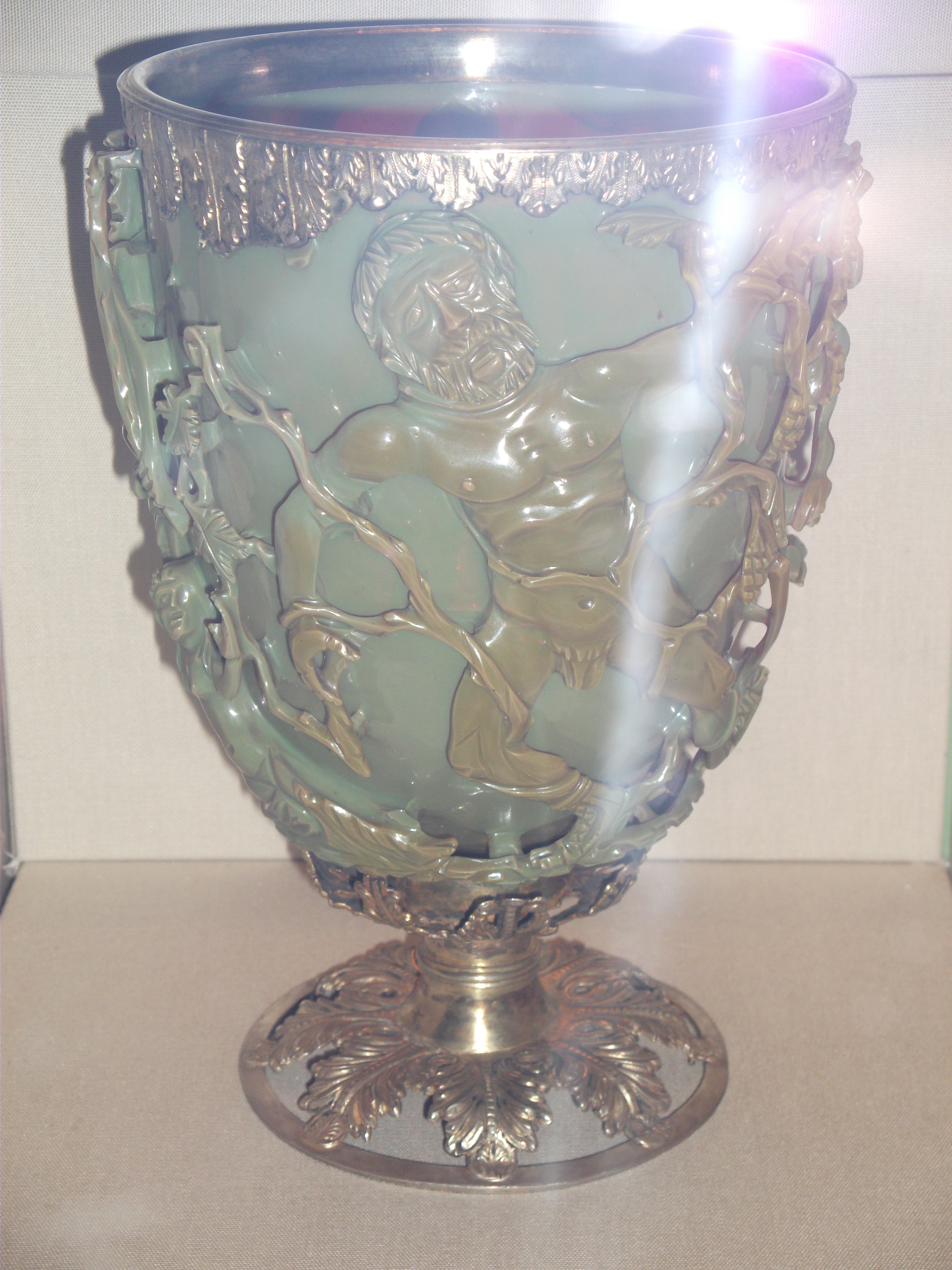
The Lycurgus Cup lit from in front

== Historiography ==
There was little discussion of the group until the 1950s. In 1950 Victor, Lord Rothschild asked the British Museum to investigate his Lycurgus Cup, which he subsequently sold to the museum in 1958. In 1956 the German scholar Fritz Fremersdorf published an account of their manufacture by cutting and grinding, which remains the conventional theory. In 1959 a detailed account of the Lycurgus Cup was published by Donald Harden and Jocelyn Toynbee, which also discussed diatreta as a group, effectively for the first time. A major exhibition in 1987, "Glass of the Caesars", organized by the Corning Museum of Glass and shown in the British Museum, Cologne and Milan, united several of the leading examples, and its catalogue, edited by Harden, remains a key work. Modern replica cups have been made several times, partly to test hypotheses of the method. Supposedly, an early German example made in 1906 was filled with a celebratory drink of champagne and then broke at the rim when the cutter began to drink.

== See also ==
- Conchylia cup
