= Zwischengoldglas =

Type of decorated glassware

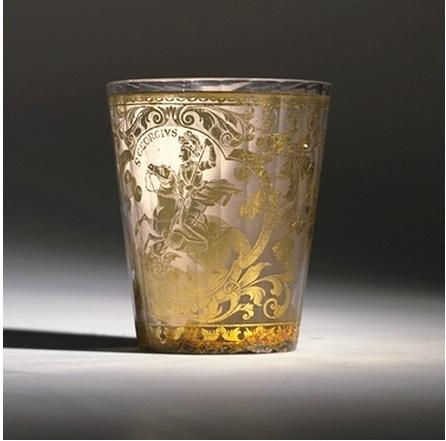
Beaker made using the ‘Zwischengoldglas’ technique, mid 18th century V&A Museum no. 1271-1872

Zwischengoldglas, (German "gold between glass", plural Zwischengoldgläser) is a type of decorated glassware in which a design in gold leaf is created on a glass vessel, then sealed under another precisely-fitting glass vessel, which is then bonded to the first piece with cement. The use of adhesive rather than fusing by heat the two layers of glass is what distinguishes the process in English from the gold glass technique, which was popular in the late Roman Empire, although in German "zwischengoldglas" is often used for both.

The technique dates from the third century BC, and was used in the Roman Empire, although fused gold glass was more common. Zwischengoldglas was revived in Bohemia and Austria in the 18th century and pieces from this period onwards are most common. Other forms of gold-decorated glassware are sometimes called verre églomisé, though this also covers glass which is simply gilded (or coated with other types of metal leaf) on the back, as used in 19th century shop signs and the like.
