= List of gold glass portraits =

Surviving ancient Roman gold glass portraits

This is a list of surviving ancient Roman gold glass portraits of the finer painted sort. The majority of surviving Roman gold glass pieces are the cut-off bottoms of drinking glasses made with unpainted gold leaf. These sometimes bear the names of individuals and were probably commemorative gifts on a special occasion such as a wedding anniversary or winning a contest. Achieving a good likeness was probably not an aim, and certainly not an achievement of this class of object, and they are not included here. The objects here belong to a smaller class of finely painted portrait miniatures, although a few seem also to have been originally placed in cups. Following a table summarizing the basic information, individual portraits are discussed in separate sections.

== Corpus ==
Portrait	Location	Date	Size	Inscription
	Museo di Santa Giulia, Brescia, Italy. Traditionally, but wrongly, identified as Galla Placidia with Valentinian III and Honoria. See section below for full account.	3rd or 4th century	6 cm (2.4 in) in diameter	Greek: ΒΟΥΝΝΕΡΙ ΚΕΡΑΜΙ (bounneri kerami, meaning uncertain; maybe "Bunneri the potter", using an Egyptian Greek form of κεραμεύς, kerameus)
	Metropolitan Museum of Art, New York City	250–300	4.1 cm (1.6 in) in diameter	Greek: ΓΕΝΝΑΔΙ ΧΡѠΜΑΤΙ ΠΑΜΜΟΥϹΙ (Gennadi chrōmati pammousi, "Gennadios, most skilled in music")
	Metropolitan Museum of Art, New York City	early 4th century	4.8 cm (1.9 in) in diameter	no inscription
	Corning Museum of Glass, Corning, New York	3rd century	4.9 cm (1.9 in) in diameter	Latin: ANATOLI GAVDIAS ("Anatolius, rejoice!")
	Victoria and Albert Museum, London	3rd or 4th century	4.4 cm (1.7 in) in diameter	no inscription
	British Museum, London	?	5.1 cm (2.0 in) in diameter	no inscription
	Archeological Museum, Bologna, Italy	1st quarter of 4th century	5.1 cm (2.0 in) in diameter	Latin transcription of Greek: PIE ZESES ("Drink and you will live")
	Archeological Museum, Bologna, Italy	1st quarter of 4th century	4.5 cm (1.8 in) in diameter	no inscription
	Archeological Museum, Bologna, Italy	4th century	3.5 cm (1.4 in) in diameter	Latin: M. COCCEIUS ONESIMUS (probably, the name of the boy)
	Archeological Museum, Arezzo, Italy	200–250	4.4 cm (1.7 in) in diameter	no inscription
	Museo Sacro, Vatican Library	first half of the 3rd century	4.9 cm (1.9 in) in diameter	Latin: GRECO RIBIBETPROPINATVIS (perhaps Gregori bibe et propina tuis, "Gregory, drink and drink to thine")
	Vatican Library	?	?	no inscription
	Museo Sacro, Vatican Library	3rd century	4.8 cm (1.9 in) in diameter	Latin: EUSEBI ANIMA DULCIS, "To sweet-souled Eusebius" (?)
	Vatican Museums	3rd or 4th century	?	Latin: GREGORI SIMPLICI CONRECESCATES (perhaps a misspelling of congregatus, so "Gregorius [and] Simplicius together")
	Catacomb of San Panfilo, Rome	4th century or earlier	?	no inscription
	Museo Civico, Turin, Italy	mid-3rd century	4.5 cm (1.8 in) in diameter	no inscription
	Museo Civico, Turin, Italy	3rd century	?	no inscription
	Vatican Museums	17th-century copy of a lost original	?	Latin: [partly illegible] CE PIE ZESES (Romanisation of Greek: "Drink [and] you will live")

== Brescia medallion ==
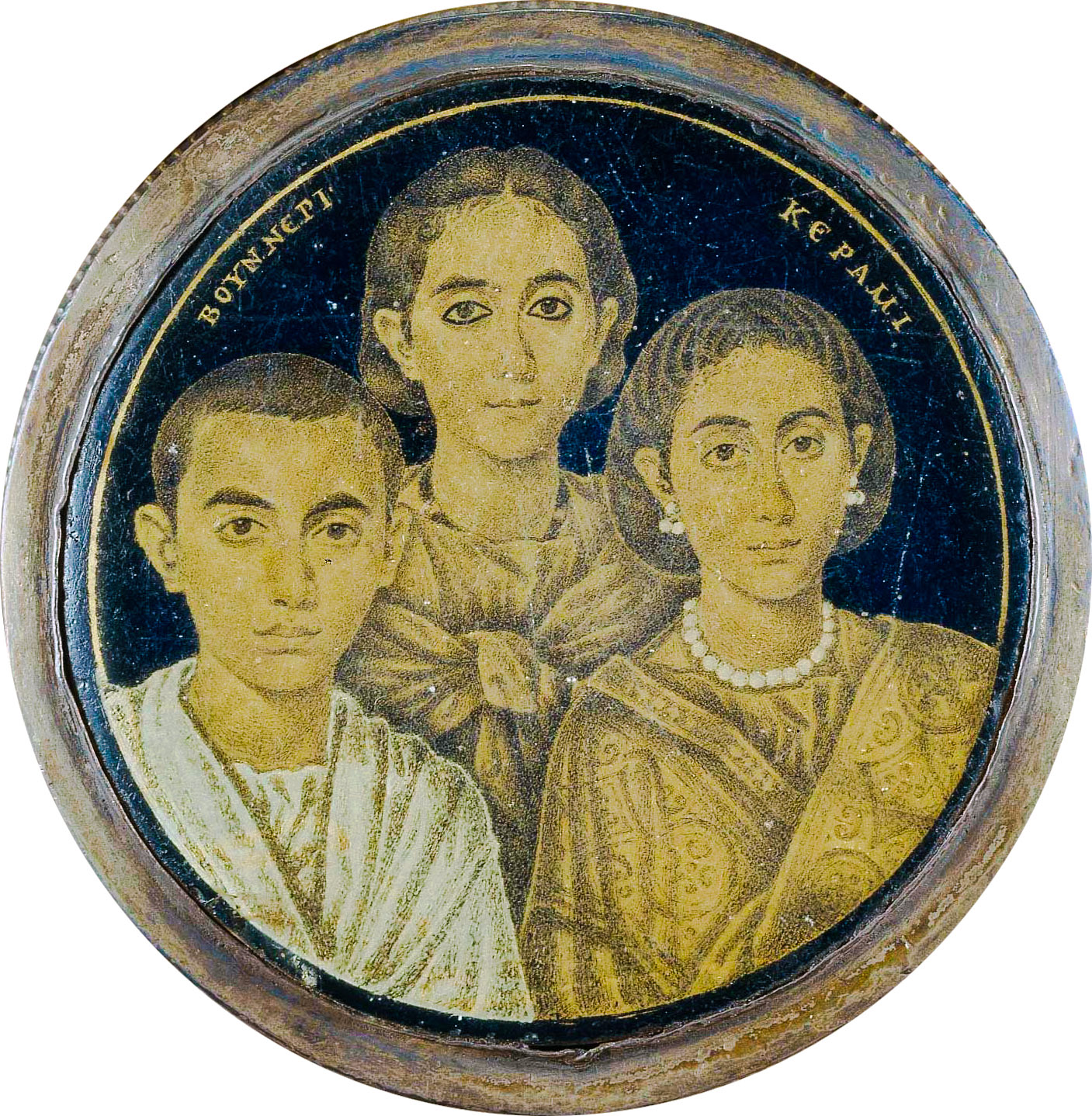
Brescia medallion

The portrait medallion is a part of the ornamentation of the so-called Desiderius Cross, 9th-century processional crux gemmata now in Museo di Santa Giulia, Brescia, Italy.

The medallion is often referred to as a portrait of Galla Placidia and her children, but the current scholarly consensus is strongly against this 18th-century identification.

Some 19th-century scholars, including Raffaele Garrucci and Hermann Vopel, suspected the work to be a fake. The earliest mention of the medallion comes from a 17th-century inventory. In 1762, Francesco Antonio Zaccaria recalled that he saw it circa 1725.

Several details indicate the Egyptian, perhaps Alexandrian origin of the medallion. Both words of the inscription (ΒΟΥΝΝΕΡΙ ΚΕΡΑΜΙ) end in iota, possibly indicating the Ancient Greek dialect of Egypt; ΚΕΡΑΜΙ, then, means "potter". Stylistically, the painting is closely related to the 3rd-century mummy portraits found in the Faiyum Oasis. The costumes are more consistent with the contemporary fashions in Egypt than in Rome itself. In particular, the mantle worn by the middle figure is not fastened by a fibula, but instead knotted; one parallel for this is a 3rd-century Coptic tapestry medallion, now in the Hermitage Museum, showing the goddess Gaea with her mantle knotted in a similar way. The peculiar hair style of the older woman is unknown in Roman portraiture, but can be found on some 3rd-century plaster mummy masks from Egypt.

Howells (2015) summarizes the research into the Brescia medallion demonstrating its connection to contemporaneous Roman-Egyptian art (in particular the Fayum mummy portraits) as well as linguistic arguments supporting the authenticity of the artefact based on 18th century scholarship. Jás Elsner (2007) also contends that the Brescia medallion likely depicts a family from Alexandria, since the inscription is in the Alexandrian dialect of Greek, and provides possible dates ranging from the early-3rd to mid-5th century AD, before it found its way to Italy where it adorned a 7th-century cross.

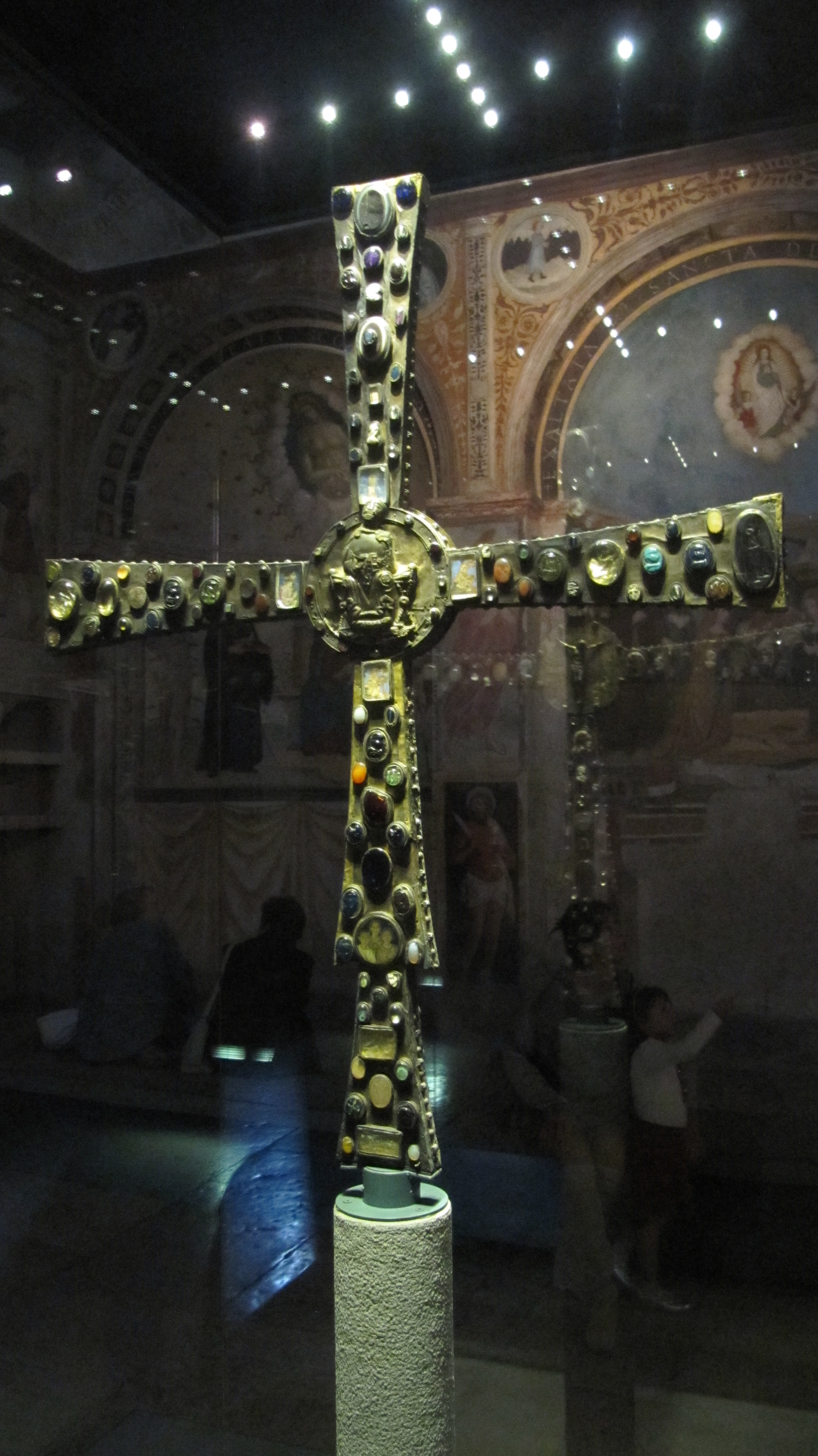
Desiderius cross (enlarge the image to see the medallion in the centre of the lower part of the cross)

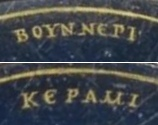
Greek inscription, ΒΟΥΝΝΕΡΙ ΚΕΡΑΜΙ

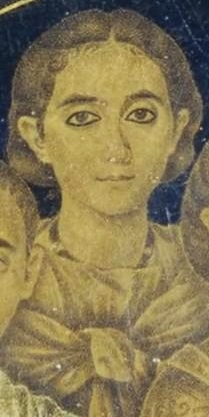
The middle figure, mantle knotted on her breast

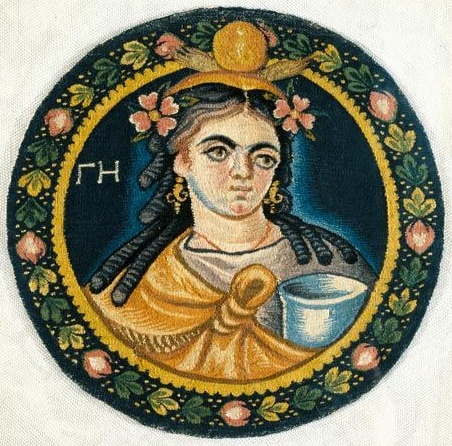
Coptic tapestry medallion showing Gaea wearing a mantle knotted on her breast. From Akhmim, 3rd or 4th century. Hermitage Museum

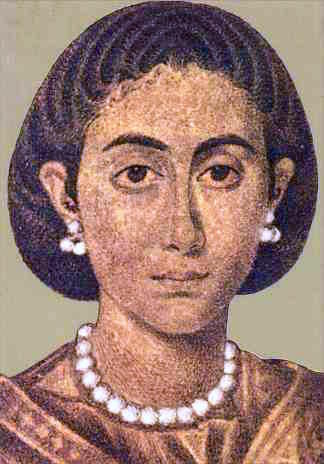
The right figure, with a hair style peculiar to Egypt

== Ficoroni medallion ==
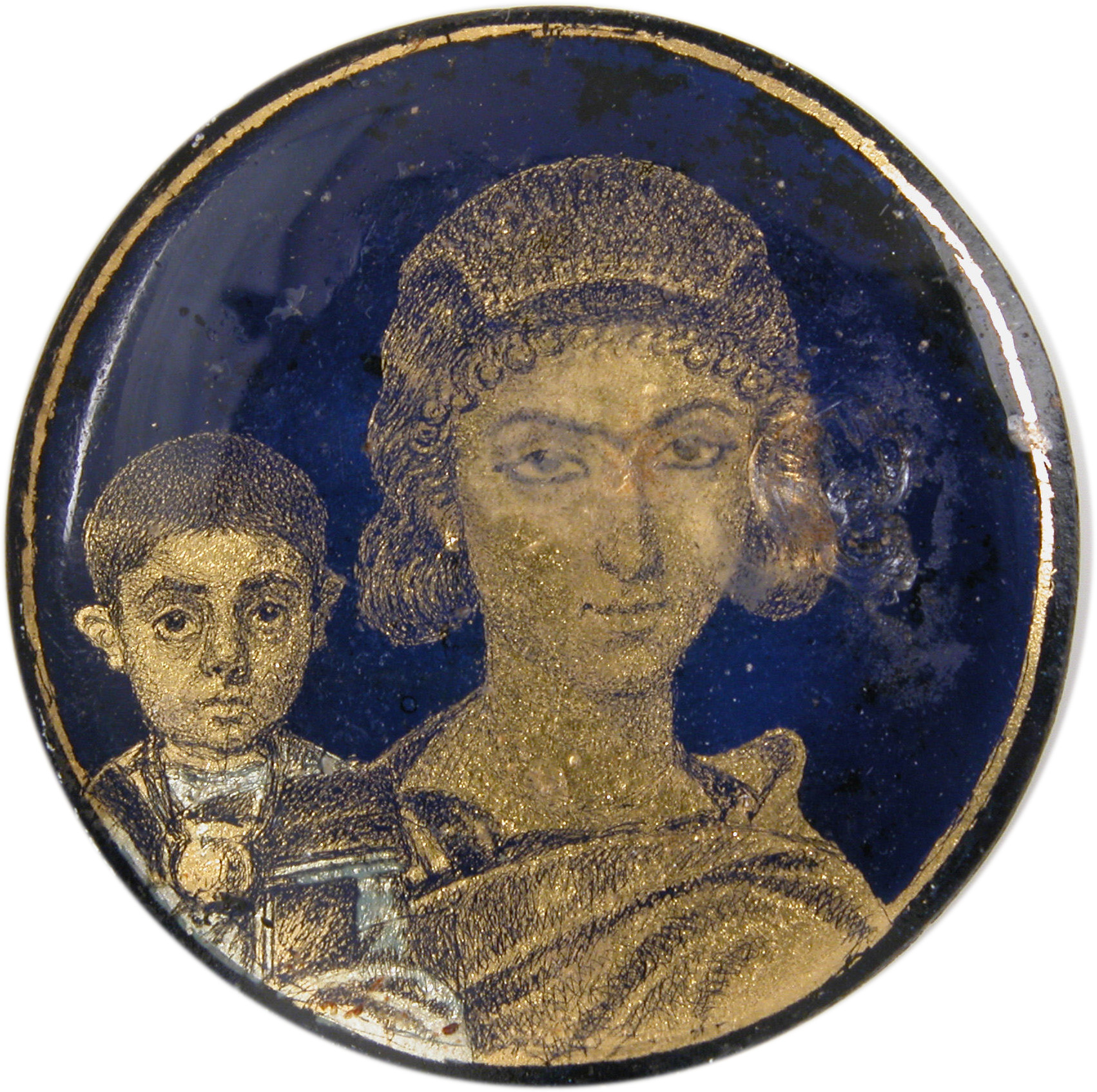
Ficoroni medallion

== Fakes ==
Gold-glass forgeries are known to have been forged all through the 18th and 19th centuries. In 1759, French antiquarian Anne Claude de Caylus wrote that contemporary Roman dealers were selling gold-glass reproductions to tourists who thought them original. Metropolitan Museum of Art has what are thought to be two 18th-century fake group portraits, while the British Museum has two 19th-century ones.

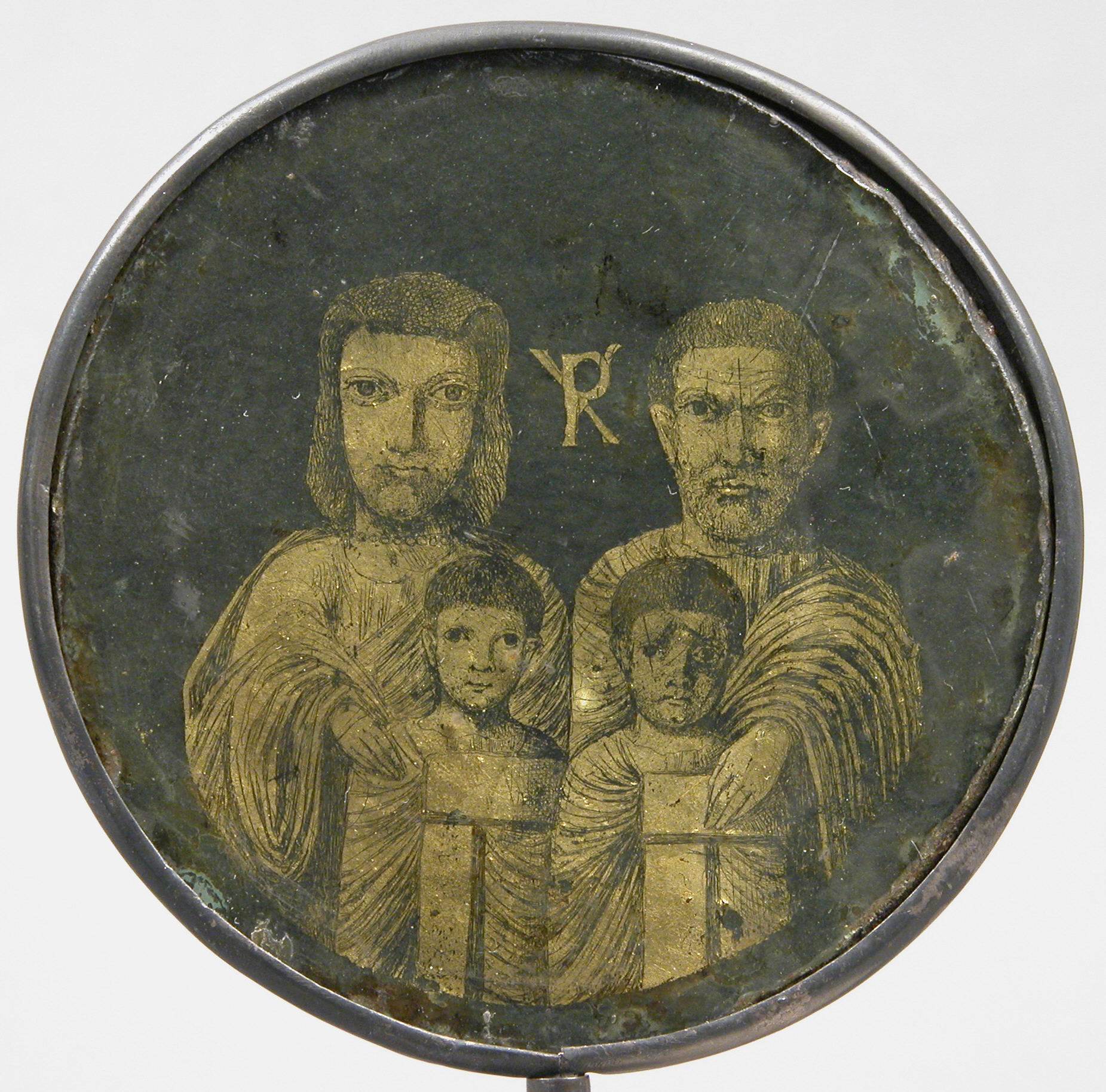
18th century
Metropolitan Museum of Art

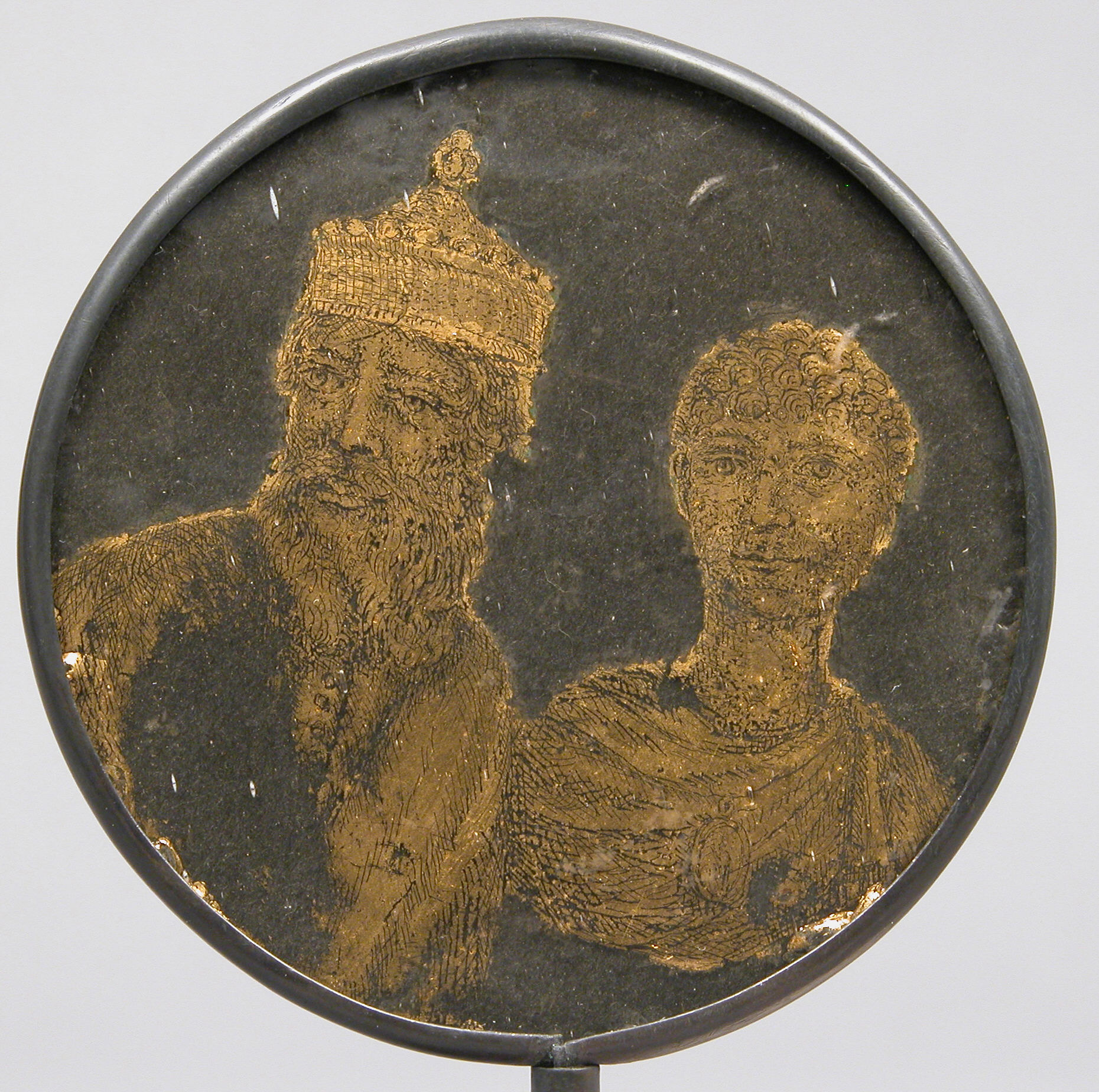
18th century
Metropolitan Museum of Art

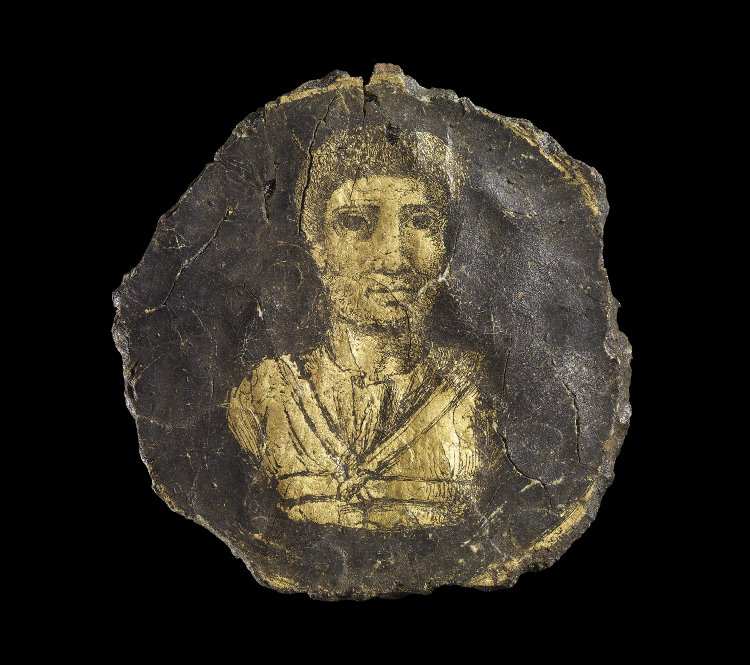
19th century
British Museum

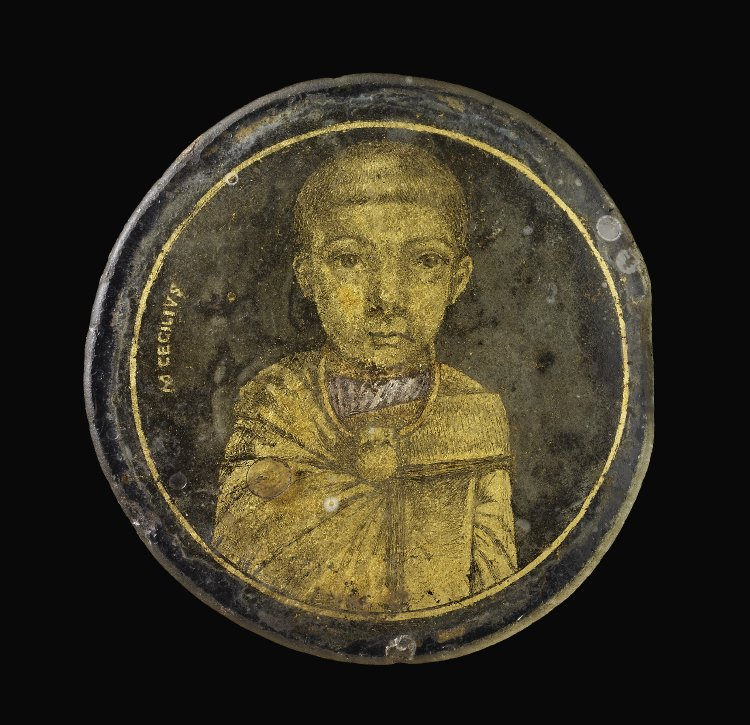
19th century
British Museum

== See also ==
- Gold glass
- Roman portraiture
- Fayum mummy portraits
