= Hellenistic glass =

Glass produced during the Hellenistic period

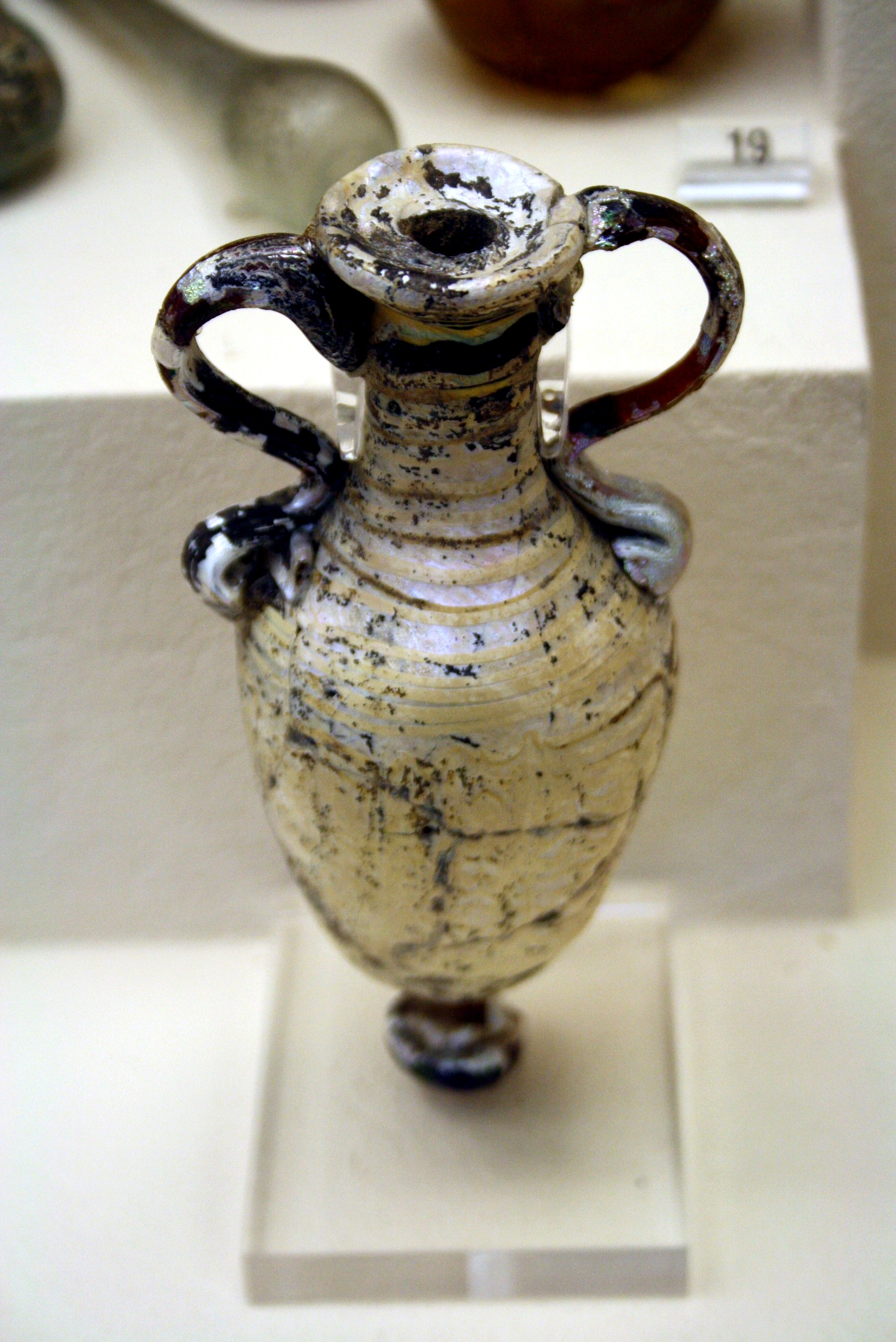
Hellenistic glass

Hellenistic glass was glass produced during the Hellenistic period (4th century BC – 5th century AD) in the Mediterranean, Europe, western Asia and northern Africa. Glassmaking at this time was based on the technological traditions of the Classical antiquity and the Late Bronze Age, but was marked by transition from limited production of luxury objects made for the social elite to mass production of affordable glass vessels used by the broader public to satisfy everyday needs.

After the introduction of translucent and transparent glass, attempts were made to mimic precious and semi-precious stones, as well as rock crystal.

== History ==
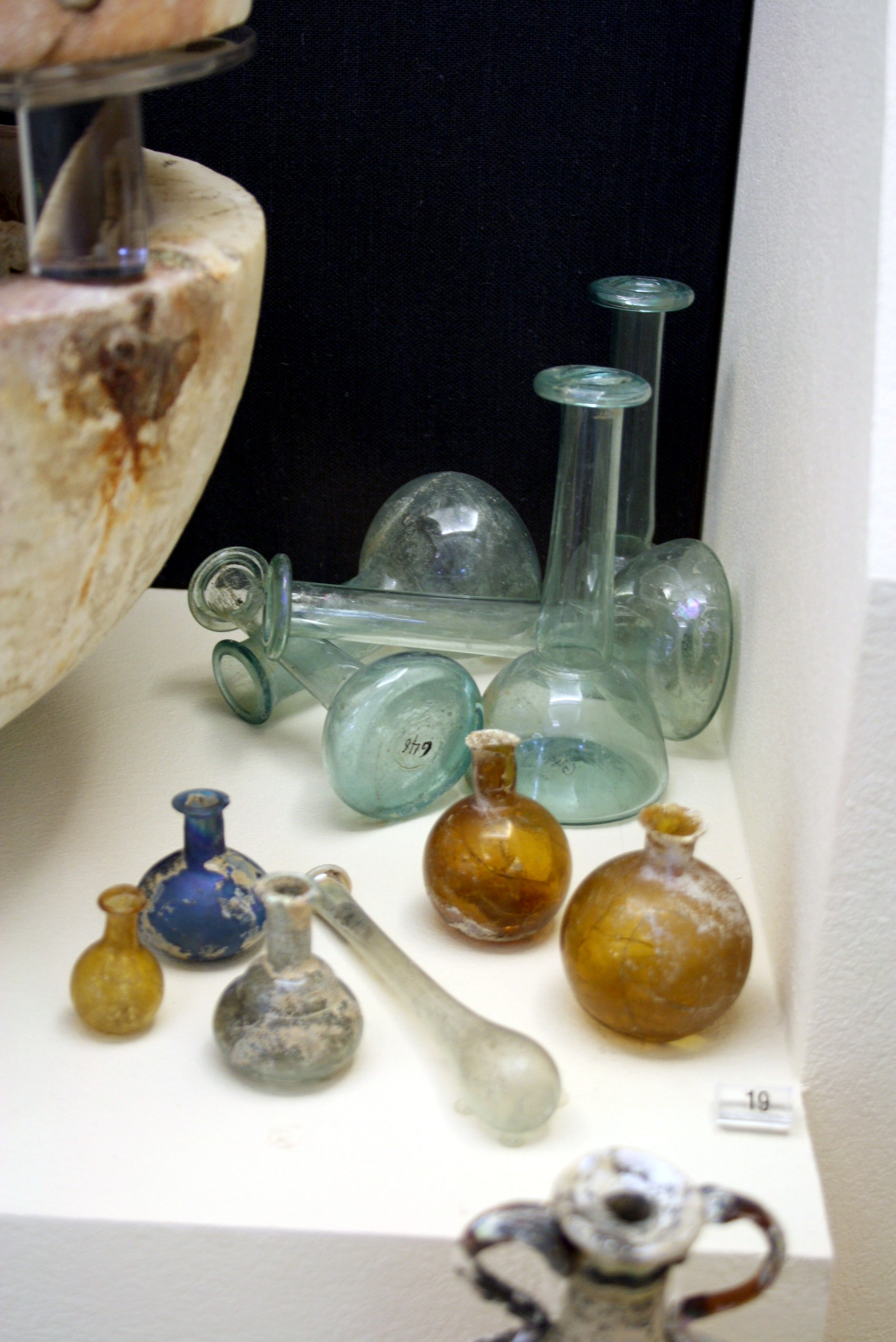
Glass unguentaria

Core-formed glass vessels produced in the Mediterranean from 1525 to 50 BC were the most numerous and widespread. Core-formed vessels were generally small in size, opaque and designed to store perfumes, scented oils and cosmetics. The most common shapes were alabastra, amphoriskoi, aryballoi and lentoid aryballoi, oinochoai (jugs), and for the first time in the Hellenistic period hudriskai (three-handled flasks) and unguentaria (unguent bottles).

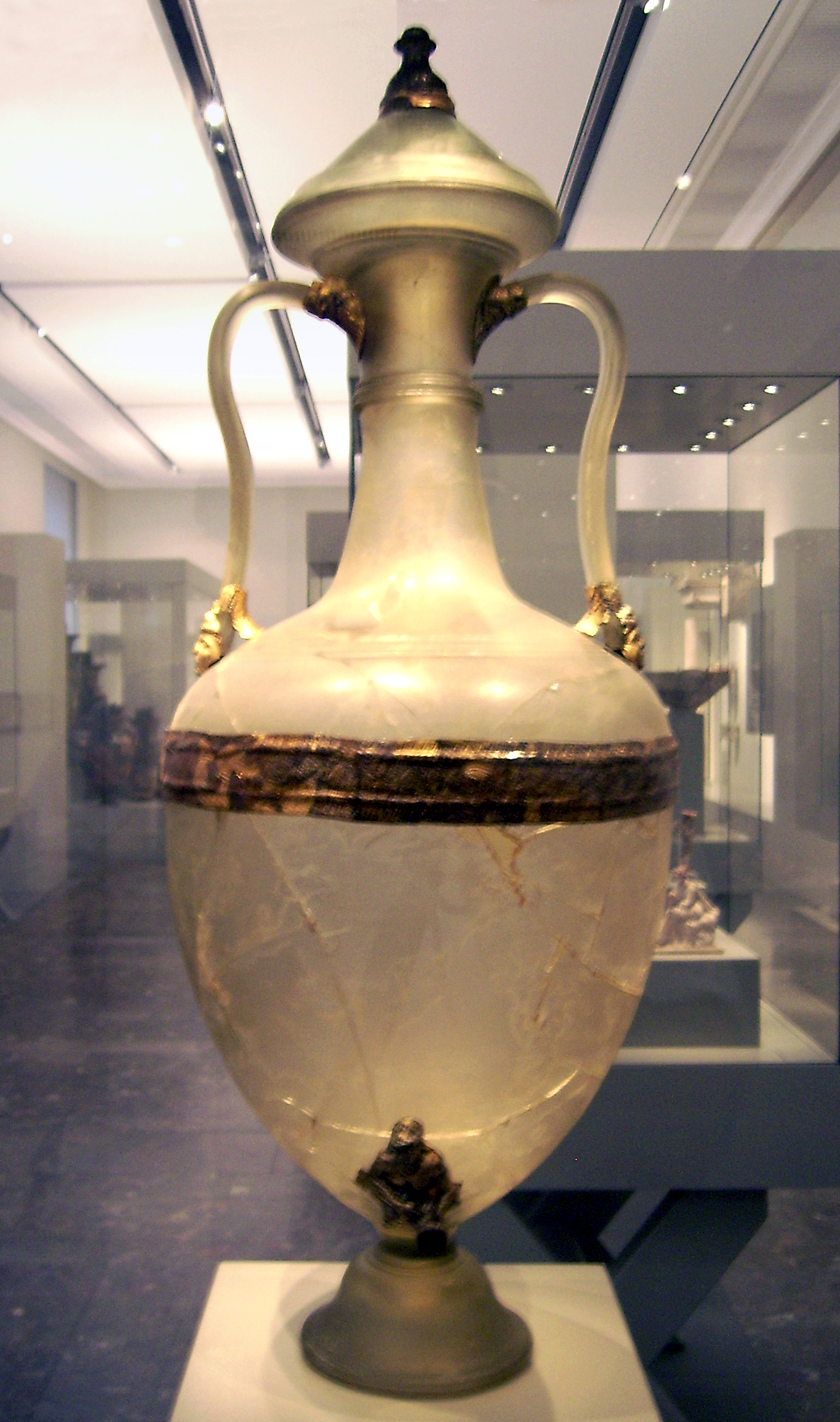
A Greek glass amphora, 2nd half of the 2nd century BC, from Olbia, now in the Altes Museum

During the second half of the 3rd century BC, mosaic glass, also known as 'millefiori', literally, a thousand flowers, emerged. The group consists mostly of fused and slumped broad plates and shallow dishes with upright or out-splayed rims or hemispherical bowls. Sub-groups of mosaic glass production are 'network' or 'lacework' hemispherical bowls and vessels with meandering or spiral decorative patterns that imitate onyx. Often these bowls had a rim formed of a single ‘network’ cane of spirally twisted threads which gives a 'striped' effect. It is best represented in burial contexts from several large tombs in Canosa di Puglia (ancient Canusium) in Italy. They are open vessels since they are made with a mould but still opaque, like the widely produced core-formed vessels.

The origins of the mosaic glassworking technique are traced back in the 15th century BC in the Mesopotamian glassmaking centres, such as Tell-al-Rimah, ΄Aqar Qūf and Marlik. Although the mosaic technique at the time was practiced in a desultory way, it is the predecessor of the elaborated mosaic vessels of high quality of the Alexandrian workshops, after the foundation of the city of Alexandria in Egypt in 332 BC by Alexander the Great, which is said to be the main production centre of these vessels.

By the early 2nd century BC, monochrome drinking vessels, mainly hemispherical and sub-conical bowls were introduced. They were made in considerable quantities in the Syro-Palestinian coast and were widely traded and exported to several trading centres throughout the Mediterranean. Earlier examples were made of clear greenish, brownish or almost colourless glass, while later on they often had green, amber, blue or wine-purple colour. Usually, they were decorated with linear-cut concentric circles at the bottom or right under the rim either on the inside or the outside (Tatton-Brown and Andrews 2004). They were made in an open mould, which is in fact a relatively cheap technique that requires less effort put and it was this that allowed their large-scale production.

Within the production of these drinking vessels, from the mid-2nd century BC onwards, translucent or transparent glass tableware (plates, dishes, bowls, drinking vessels, such as skyphoi, footed bowls or handled cups) was introduced; glass tableware production once established enjoyed several glassworking centres and contributed in the dramatic increase of the Hellenistic glass industry. This was the first time that glass vessels were widely consumed by the broader public as a widespread commodity, something that continued ever since and was achieved in a higher degree with the invention of the even more economical glassblowing technique.

During the 1st century BC, new types of monochrome glass vessels were introduced and ribbed bowls started to be produced. They were mould-press bowls with ribs on the outside and their production centres were concentrated in the Levant and the Syro-Palestinian coast, like the monochrome hemispherical/conical bowls.

However, the production of luxury glass vessels did not cease and glass vessels imitating precious metal vessels (gold- and silver-ware) were produced with new glassworking techniques to satisfy the needs of the elite social strata market. Gold sandwich glass vessels and gold-band alabastra were innovations of the late Hellenistic period addressed to a more limited range of wealthy customers. The manufacturing techniques were the same, namely the mould-press and core-form mosaic techniques respectively. However, they were developed further more in order to achieve a quite elaborate decorative aspect.

== Other glass objects ==
Hellenistic glass industry also included a range of other objects, mainly for decorative purposes. The broadest groups of glass objects were these of glass beads and inlays, like in all periods since the introduction of glassmaking in the ancient world. The mass production of glass beads of many varieties is well represented in the context of a Hellenistic glass workshop in Rhodes, where 10,000 beads of 40 different shapes and colours have been found; Rings, pendants, gemstones, amulets, small sculptures were also made with the mould-casting technique.

Inlays were produced to decorate wooden articles, furniture, chests, sarcophagi and jewellery in combination with other, often precious materials, such as gold leaf or ivory. For example, glass inlays decorated the ionic capitals of north porch of the Erechtheion in the Athenian Acropolis. Inlays were deeply rooted in the Egyptian glassmaking industry and their production, with the mosaic technique after the Pharaonic tradition, continued to flourish during the Hellenistic period with old or new repertories inspired from the Greek world. Game counters and gaming pieces were made also as one way to recycle scrap glass left over from the manufacture of other articles.

Like in many other occasions, these objects are well represented and archaeologically found along with various types of glass vessels in rich burial contexts, e.g. this of Amphipolis.

== Primary production centres ==
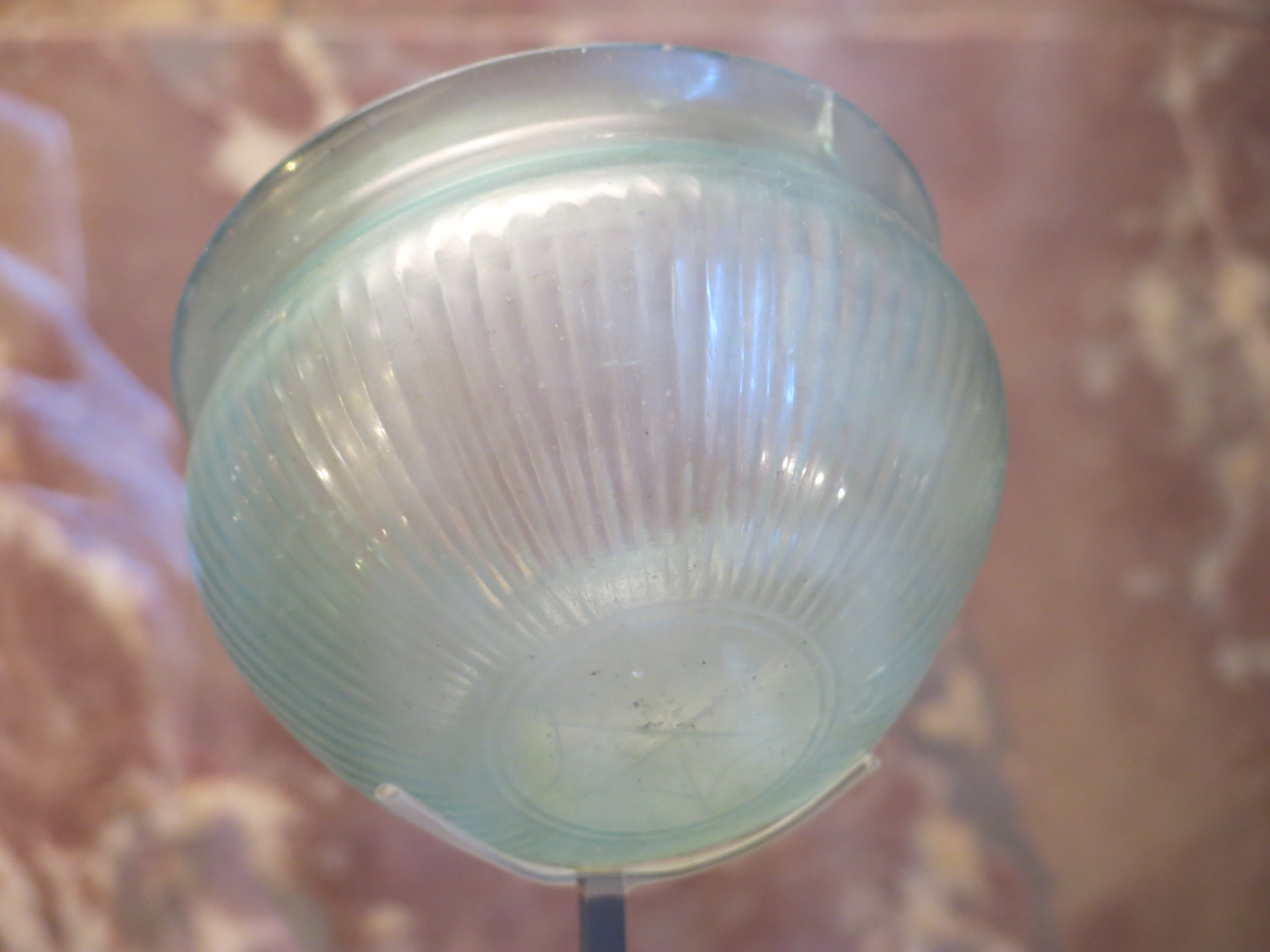
Fluted bowl, 150-100 BC

Glassmaking and glassworking were considered two totally separate crafts and took place in different regions (Grose 1981). Each craft was characterized by its own technological tradition, know-how and equipment. Glassmakers and glassworkers did not need to have an understanding of glass vessel manufacture and primary production respectively, in order to carry out their tasks.

Glassmaking had to take place as close as possible to the sources of the raw materials used, namely sand and mineral natron when it comes to the Hellenistic period. Raw glass was traded throughout the Mediterranean in the form of ingots (Stern 1999) and it was then worked and shaped into vessels, inlays, jewellery, etc., in numerous sites of the Hellenistic world.

Hellenistic glass is the typical soda-lime-silica glass, to which lime was not intentionally added, but it was provided through the agent of sand. Although, it cannot be argued with certainty where the Hellenistic primary production of raw glass was geographically located from the archaeological record, we can hypothesize that a large part of glass production took place in the Syro-Palestinian coast or the broader Levant and Egypt . In favor of this argument are comments of classical writers of the period or a little later, like Strabo (63 BC) who mentioned the Belus river on the Syrian coast to have been used for glassmaking or even by writers other such as Pliny the Elder (23-79 AD) or Tacitus (c. 56-c. 117 AD). However, archaeological evidence firmly indicate that primary production of glass, as well as glassworking took place on the island of Rhodes in the Aegean, during the Hellenistic period and, particularly, after the foundation of the city of Rhodes in 408 BC, and even earlier through the Classical period.

== Spatial distribution ==
Glassworking took place in several centres of the Hellenistic world. Raw glass was brought to glassworkers in the form of ingots, except from the Rhodian workshop which included both glassmaking and glassworking, and in turn they produced glass vessels, inlays, jewellery, etc., which were then widely traded. Although most probably core-formed vessels were traded for their content, mosaic or monochrome and transparent tableware were traded per se.

Major glassworking centres were located at the Syro-Palestinian coast, e.g. monochrome hemispherical bowls, and in Alexandria, since its foundation in 332 BC, e.g. mosaic glass vessels and inlays. The reputation of the Alexandrian workshop is well understood from luxury glass vessels decorated with Egyptian-style buildings or characteristic scenes found as far as Italy and Afghanistan or, even, produced there (Auth 2001). Glass vessels, both core-formed and mould-press, were also made in Ionia, Cyprus, Sidon, the Levant, Tel Anafa in Upper Galilee, Rome and Roman Italy, Crete, Macedonia.

Particularly interesting is the core-formed vessels’ trade and spatial distribution, since this was the group produced throughout the Hellenistic period from its very beginning to the invention of glassblowing (c. 50 BC). Core-formed bottles, along with other types of glass vessels, are found throughout the Mediterranean in the Aegean (e.g. Delos, Crete, Athens), throughout Greece, Asia Minor and western Asia (e.g. Ephesus, Sardis, Dura-Europos, Babylon, Nimrud, Nineveh, the Levant, Phoenicia), Magna Graecia (e.g. Rhegium, Morgantina) and Italy, Mesopotamia, the Balkans, Russia, the transalpine lands, Spain (Emporion) and the Balearics, northern Africa (Carthage) and Cerne on the Atlantic coast of Africa.

== Techniques ==
Glass production of vessels or other glass objects was mainly of two distinct technological traditions, these of core-formed glass and mould-press or cast glass (Grose 1981).

- Core-formed glass: is the best represented and probably the earliest manufacturing technique applied. First, a core with the bottle’s shape was shaped around a metallic rod most probably by a combination of clay, sand, mud and/or animal dung. Then, molten glass was either trailed onto the core with the aid of a second tool or directly from dipping it into a container of molten glass. The surface was smoothed by continual re-heating and rolling on a flat slab. Finally, vessels were removed from the metallic rod, they slowly cooled down in a side chamber of the glass melting furnace and, then, the core material was scraped out of the interior. Common body colours were translucent dark or cobalt blue, opaque white, brown, red or olive-green and of the decoration opaque yellow, orange, white or turquoise trails in zigzag or feather patterns. This technique limited considerably the size of the vessels, which were mainly close vessels with thick walls.
- Mould-press or cast glass: it was first practiced by the Hellenistic glassworkers from the 3rd century BC onwards. Although different decorative results were achieved by variations in colours, the technique was virtually the same for mosaic, monochrome hemispherical bowls, transparent tableware and gold-sandwich vessels, both luxurious fine ware and more affordable types. Mould-press or cast vessels were mainly open bowls, shallow dishes and jars, but some closed vessels were produced as well. They were made from a single mould on which a piece of glass was slumped.
- Mosaic glass: vessels, namely bowls and plates, as well as inlays were produced with the mosaic technique. A multicoloured effect is achieved as a result of a variety of diverse cane configurations and colour combinations fused together and then slumped on an open mould.
- Network: a type of mosaic glass made of canes of spirally twisted glass threads of different colours laid side by side.
- Gold-sandwich glass: also found for the first time during the Hellenistic period. It technique consists of a ‘sandwich’ of two decolorized glass layers which enclose a sheet of gold leaf between them. The vessels were formed of two castings and they were carefully ground and polished.
- Cold-cutting: grinding and polishing by the application of stone-cutting techniques and by using harder materials, such as quartz. It was used as a supplementary technique to other processes as finishing and decoration.

== See also ==
- Levantine archaeology
