= Gold glass =

Type of glass with gold leaf between layers of glass

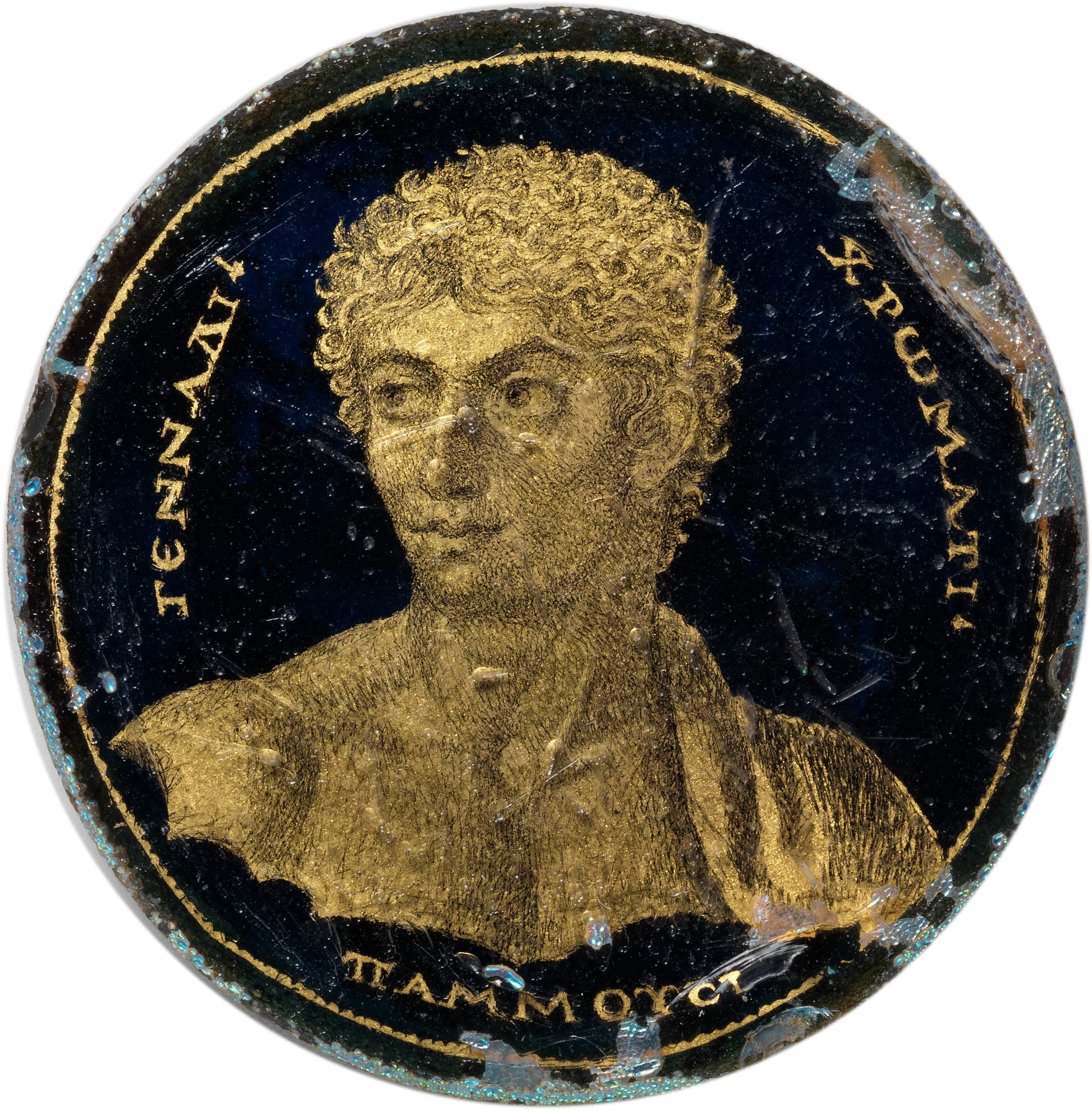
Gold glass medallion of a youth named Gennadios, who was "most accomplished in the musical arts". Probably from Hellenized Alexandria, Egypt, c. 250–300. Diameter 4.2 cm (1 5/8 inches)

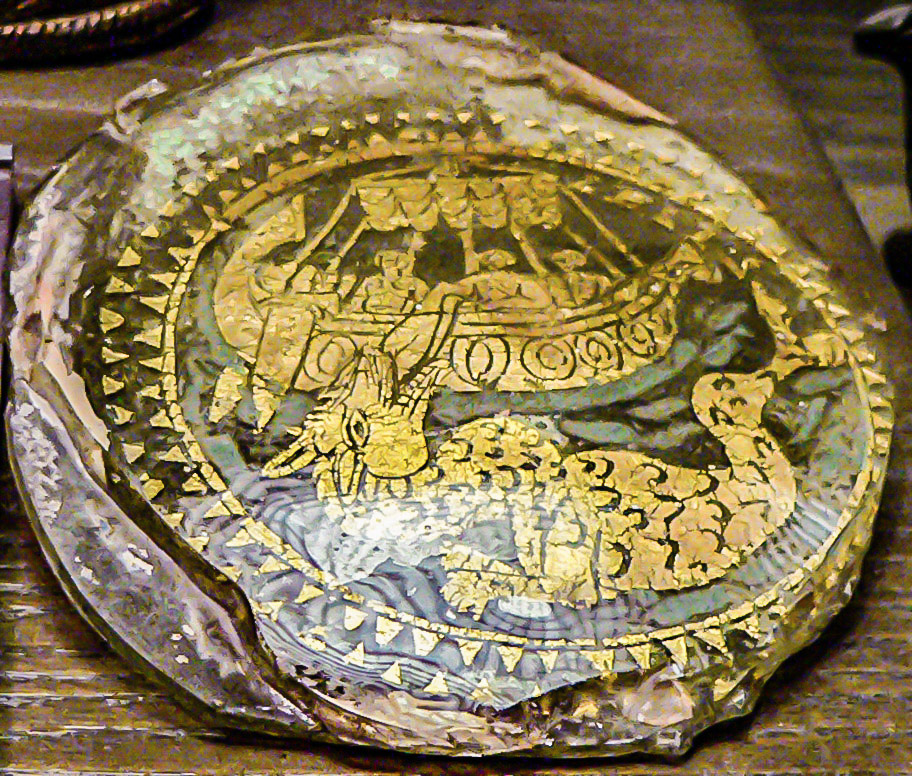
Rather roughly trimmed Christian piece with Jonah and the Whale, 10.5 cm across, 4th century

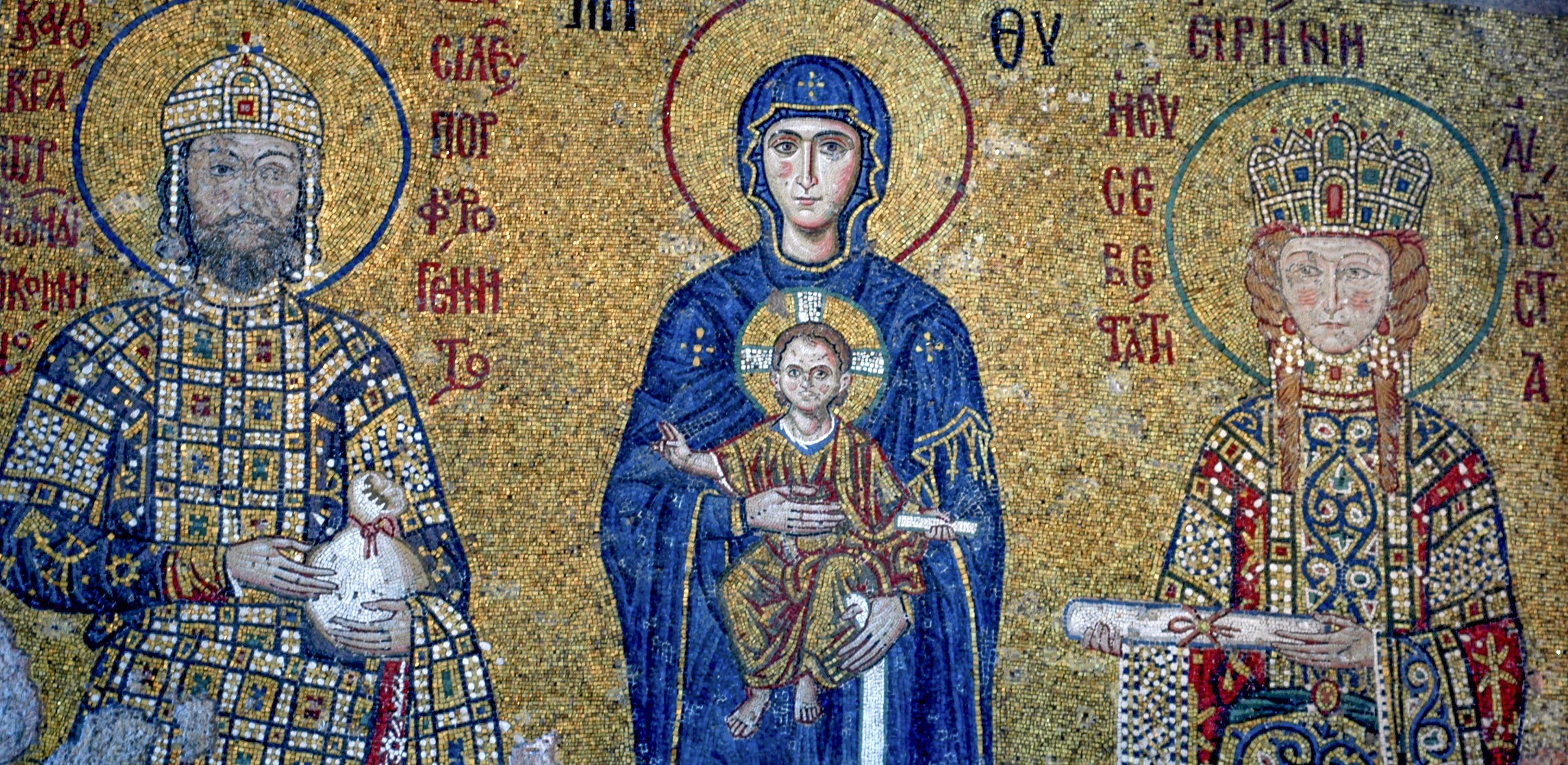
Gold sandwich glass was also used for the gold tesserae used in Late Antique, Byzantine and medieval mosaics, as here in Hagia Sophia.

Gold glass or gold sandwich glass is a luxury form of glass where a decorative design in gold leaf is fused between two layers of glass. First found in Hellenistic Greece, it is especially characteristic of the Roman glass of the Late Empire in the 3rd and 4th century AD, where the gold decorated roundels of cups and other vessels were often cut out of the piece they had originally decorated and cemented to the walls of the catacombs of Rome as grave markers for the small recesses where bodies were buried. About 500 pieces of gold glass used in this way have been recovered. Complete vessels are far rarer. Many show religious imagery from Christianity, traditional Greco-Roman religion and its various cultic developments, and in a few examples Judaism. Others show portraits of their owners, and the finest are "among the most vivid portraits to survive from Early Christian times. They stare out at us with an extraordinary stern and melancholy intensity". From the 1st century AD the technique was also used for the gold colour in mosaics.

Various different techniques may sometimes also be described as "gold glass". Zwischengoldglas is very similar but the two layers of glass are cemented, not fused. It mostly comes from Germany and Bohemia from the 18th and 19th centuries. Verre églomisé properly covers a single layer of glass which is gilded (or coated with other types of metal leaf) on the back, as used in 19th century shop signs and the like. One process was revived by Jean-Baptise Glomy (1711–1786), hence the name. Both of these processes were also used in ancient times, and the German and French languages often use their native terms for what is called "gold glass" in English. Gold ruby glass or "cranberry glass" is actually red, coloured by the addition of gold oxide. Gold-band glass is another ancient technique covered below.

== Technique ==
The manufacturing process for gold glass was difficult and required great skill. For a Late Roman glass, first a small round flat disc, typically about three to five inches (7.6 to 12.7 centimetres) across, was cut away from a blown sphere with a flattened bottom, either made of coloured or plain glass. A piece of gold leaf was then glued to this with gum arabic. The design was created by scraping away gold leaf. The main vessel, a cup or bowl, was formed by blowing and cutting, with a flat bottom the same size as the first disc. This was then heated again and carefully lowered onto the disc with the design, superimposing the flat bottom with the disc with the design so that they fused together. The complete vessel was then heated a final time to complete the fusing. Different accounts of different periods vary somewhat as to the precise sequence of stages and other details, but the process is essentially the same.

The larger Hellenistic glass bowls are thought to have been formed using moulding rather than blown, as the whole bowl is doubled and the inner and outer vessels must fit together exactly. Some of the finer later medallions seem to have been made as such from the start, and some contain pigments other than the gold. These smoother-edged medallions exploited the medium of glass as a matrix for portrait miniatures, and it has proved to be a very effective one, outlasting all alternatives except for precious metal and engraved gems. They were probably initially made to be hung for display, or set in jewellery in smaller examples like that of Gennadios, but were also used for funerary purposes, and often use a base of blue glass. They are a few Roman examples of vessels from Cologne of a different style where several of what have been called "sidewall blobs", small gold glass medallions about 2–3 cm (0.8–1.2 in) across, with images, are fused into the walls of a vessel.

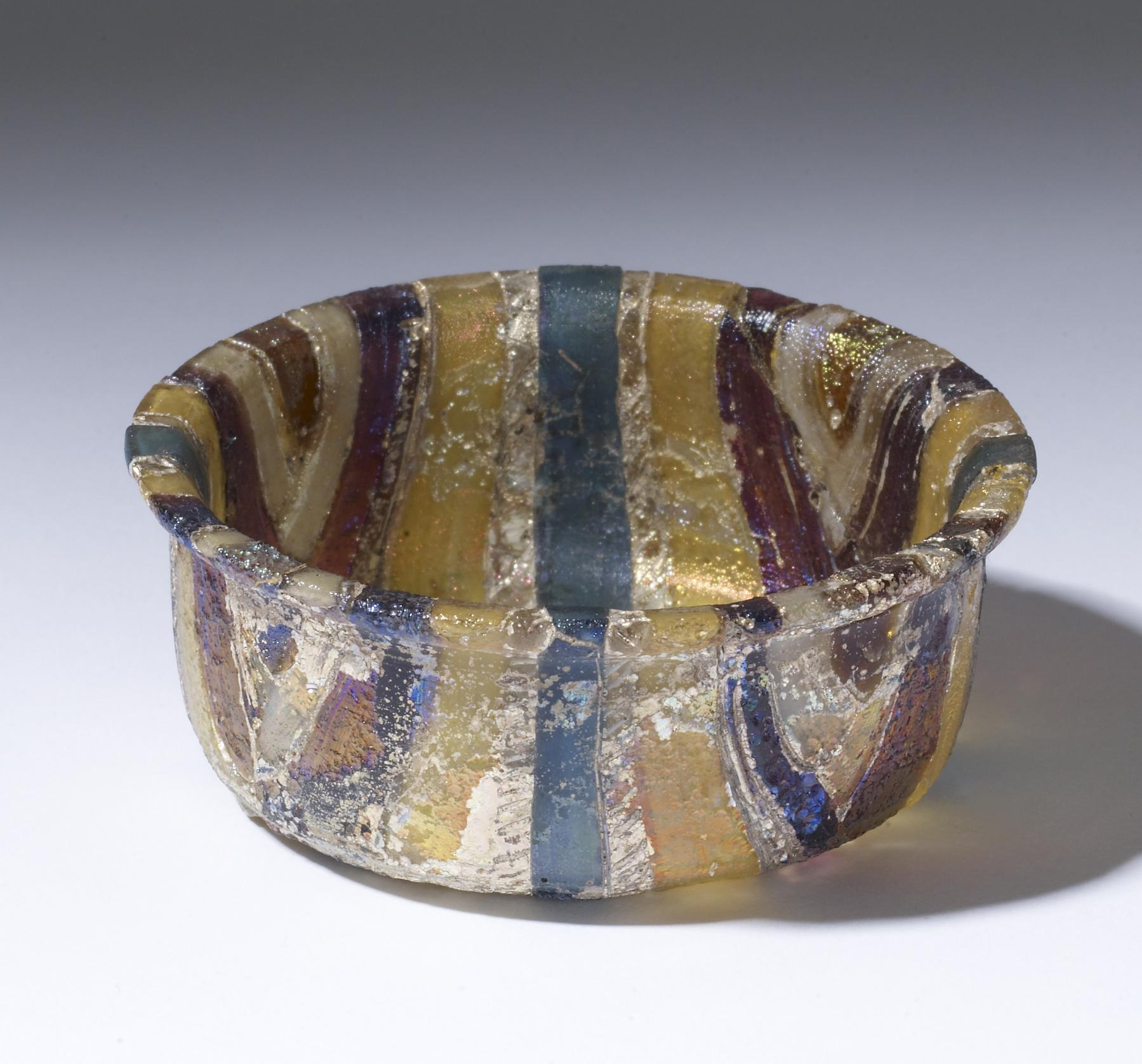
Roman bowl with gold band glass

Apart from roundels with figurative images the fused sandwich technique was used to create the tesserae for gold in mosaics, and for beads and the like. Gold glass tesserae, at least by Byzantine times, had a very thin top layer of glass, which was probably poured onto the lower glass with the gold leaf glued to it. Tesserae were made in blocks or "cakes" and then cut into cubes, which are relatively large in the case of gold backgrounds. Gold backgrounds were laid over earth red or yellow ochre backgrounds which enhanced their visual effect. Most colours of tesserae seem to have been made locally to the mosaic, but there is some discussion as to whether this was true for gold glass ones. In the 11th century the relatively new Christian centre of Kiev seems to have used gold tesserae made in Constantinople.

Roman gold glass beads were made by using an inner tube or rod to which the gold leaf was stuck. A larger tube was slid over that and the beads crimped off. Easily transported and very attractive, Roman gold glass beads have been found as far outside the Empire as the Wari-Bateshwar ruins in Bangladesh, and sites in China, Korea, Thailand and Malaysia.

Gold-band glass is a related Hellenistic and Roman technique, where strips of gold leaf, sandwiched between colourless glass, are used as part of the marbling effect in onyx glass. It is mostly found in small perfume bottles and the like.

== Grave-markers ==
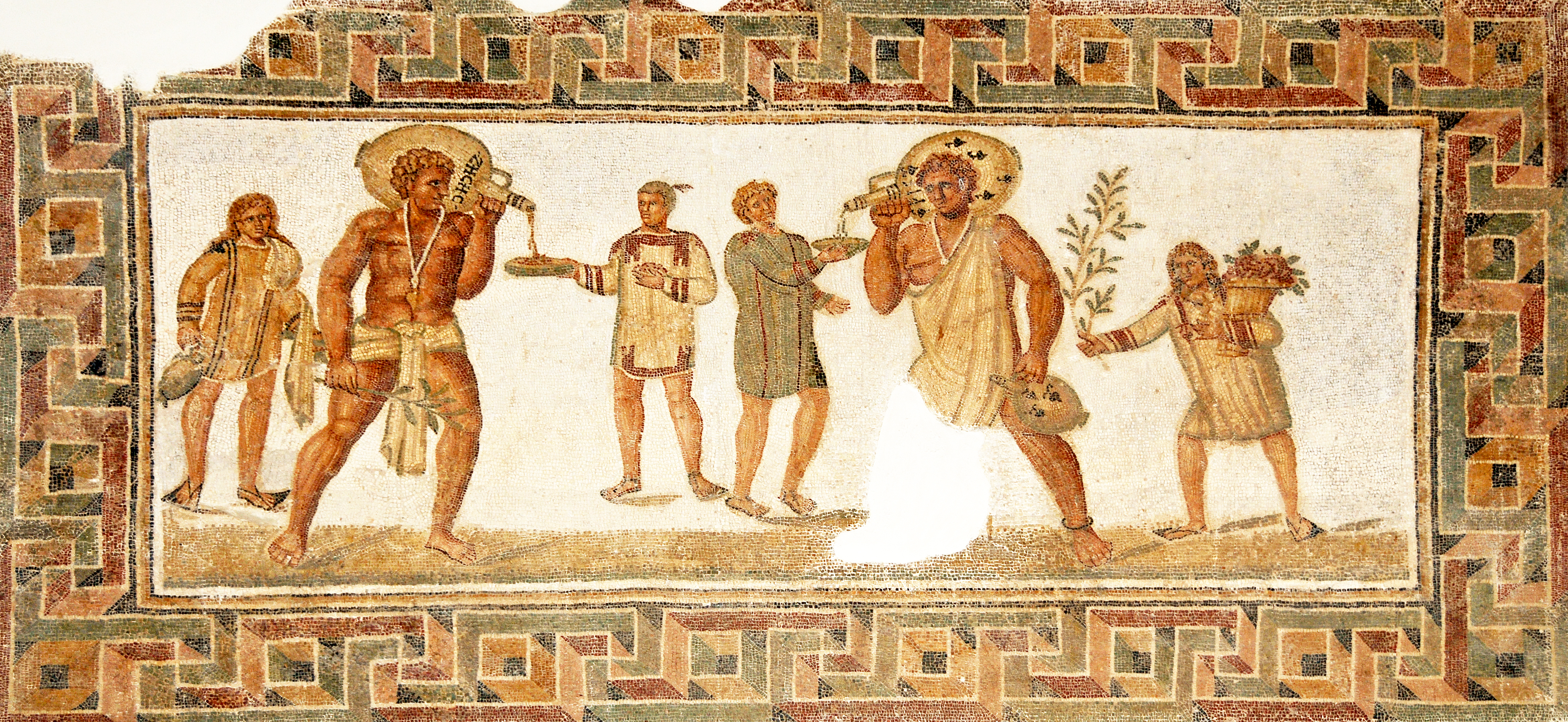
Dougga banquet scene, 3rd century (see text)

The most common form of vessel in late Roman examples was a bowl or drinking cup, which are thought to have been originally family gifts for weddings, anniversaries, New Year, the various religious festivals and the like, in some cases perhaps presented at birth or Christian baptism. None of the type of gold glass vessels cut down as grave-markers has survived complete, though about 500 of the cut-off bottoms are known, but since so many have inscriptions encouraging the owner to drink, they are usually referred to as "cups" or "glasses". However Roman drinking cups and glasses were often very wide and shallow, though tall straight-sided or slightly flared shapes like modern tumblers are also found. A mosaic in the North African ruins of Dougga shows two hefty slaves pouring wine from amphorae into two shallow bowls held by slaves waiting on the banquet. The two amphorae are inscribed with "ΠΙΕ" and "ΣΗϹΗϹ" the Greek originals of the toasting formulae "pie zeses" ("Drink, may you live", discussed below) so common on Roman glasses, and it has been suggested that the mosaic shows the shape a complete cup would have had.

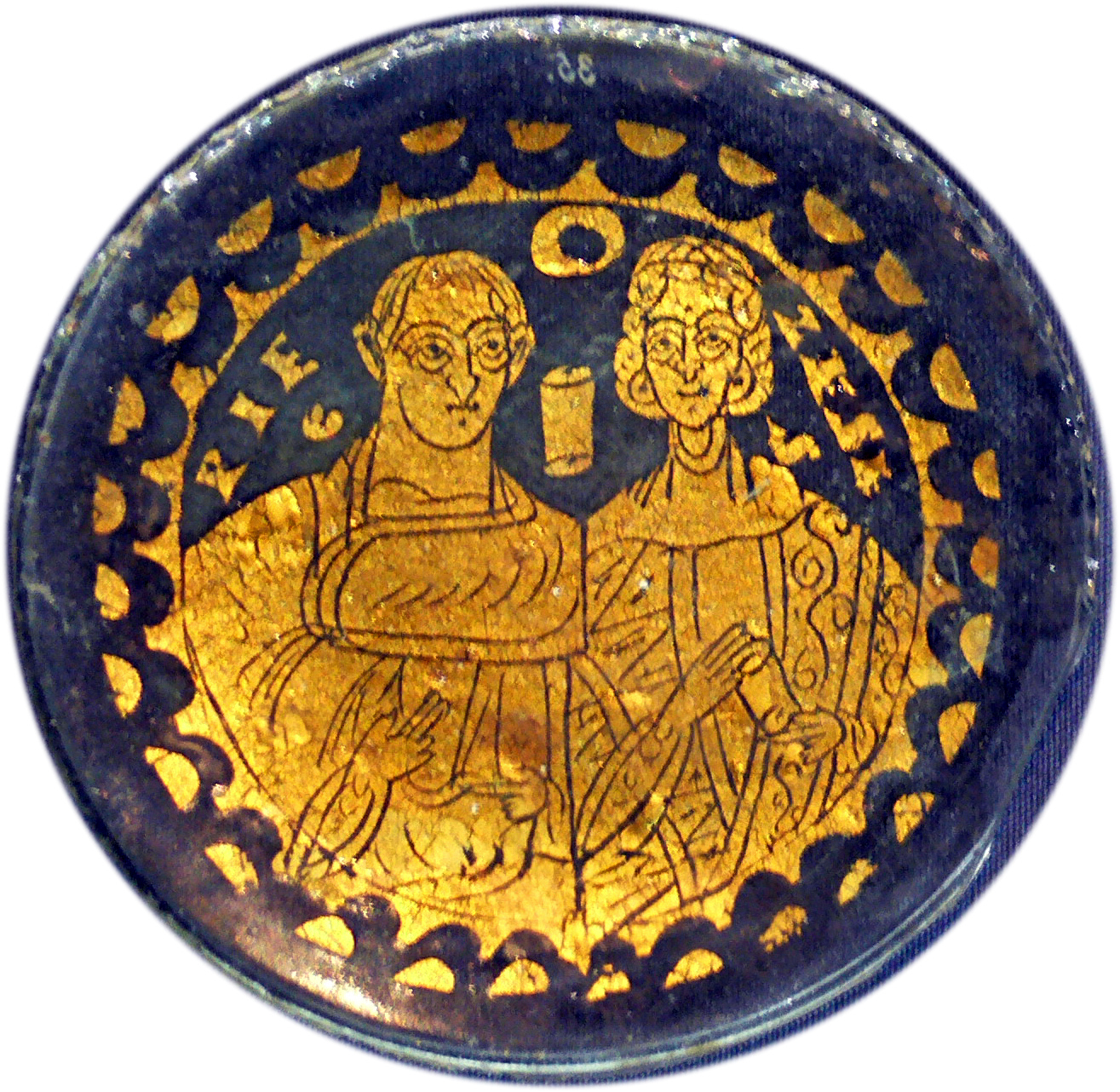
4th-century married couple, inscribed "PIE ZESES" ("Drink, may you live")

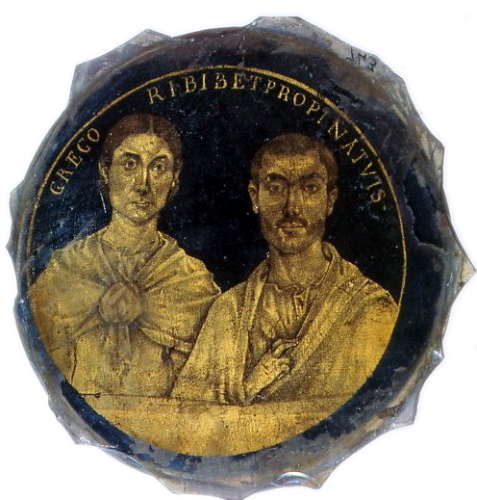
3rd-century quality portrait of a couple

At what was probably a much later date, perhaps after decades of use, on the death of the owner the main vessel of undecorated glass was cut away and trimmed to leave only the gold glass roundel, which was then used in the catacombs as a grave marker. Presumably in many cases the cup had already broken in the normal course of use, and the thick bottom with the decoration had been preserved for later use in this way. Bodies were buried in the catacombs in small recesses called loculi, stacked one above another mostly along narrow corridors hollowed out from the soft rock, and no doubt some form of marker was necessary for visitors to locate the right spot. They may also have functioned as a seal on the grave, as they were pressed into the mortar or stucco forming the final surface of the wall of the loculus; other classes of small decorative objects were also used in the same way. They may also have been regarded as capable of warding off evil spirits, especially in the later part of the period, when portraits of saints become most common.

The very untidy trimming of many examples may be explained by this; an example in the Metropolitan Museum of Art is still attached to a chunk of mortar round much of its edge, showing that the mortar overlapped the edge of the glass. Rough edges would mostly have been hidden by the mortar and also provided a firmer key for the mortar to hold the glass in place (as it happens the edges of the New York piece are unusually neatly trimmed).

Many pieces of gold glass had portraits of private individuals, mostly married couples, who may have included the deceased, while others had portraits of religious figures such as saints, or religious symbols. This custom was followed by Christian, Jewish (13 identifiably Jewish examples are known) and pagan Romans. The different sets of imagery, apart from the increased number of private portraits, are typical of the paintings also found in the catacombs and other Early Christian art and its Jewish equivalent from the period. As Christian art developed in the late 4th and 5th centuries, its changes are reflected in the subjects and their treatment in gold glass, before the catacombs ceased to be used and the supply of examples ends.

== Hellenistic period ==
The technique was used in Hellenistic times, and Hellenistic examples are generally both more technically ambitious than Roman ones, with wide bowls or drinking cups decorated all round their curved sides in gold glass, and executed with more artistry. The British Museum has a virtually complete bowl (broken but repaired) 19.3 cm wide and 11.4 cm high, one of two from a tomb in Canosa in Apulia dating to around 270–160 BC. It has most of the interior very finely decorated with lotus and acanthus motifs, which are more typical of gold glass in this period than designs with human figures. There are a handful of other near complete examples, and rather more fragments.

These pieces are usually assigned to Alexandria in Egypt, which is often seen as the originating centre for luxury Hellenistic glass, and is mentioned as the source of over-elaborate glass by the 1st century satirist Martial and other sources; one seems to show a Nilotic landscape, though this was a popular subject elsewhere. However fragments have been found when excavating a glass factory on Rhodes. A description perhaps dating from the 270s BC (surviving in the works of the later writer Athenaeus) mentions two vessels that are diachysa ("with gold in it") and very likely made by this technique.

== Roman period ==
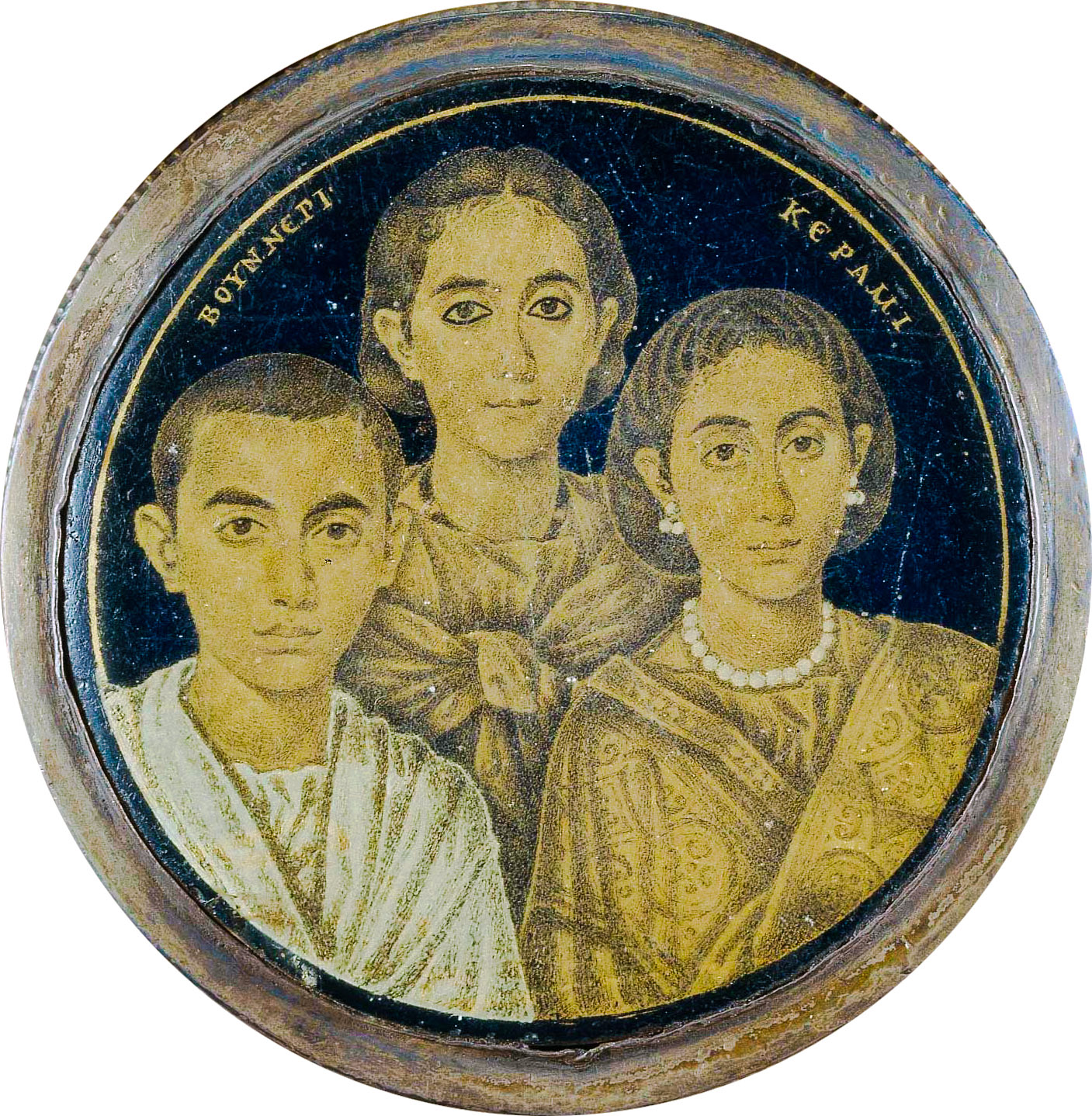
Gold glass medallion with a portrait of a family, from Alexandria (Roman Egypt), 3rd–4th century (Brescia, Museo di Santa Giulia)

Gold glass mosaic tesserae begin to be used in domestic mosaics in the 1st century AD, with Rome apparently the first location. They continued to be used throughout the ancient and medieval periods into the modern day. By around 400 gold began to be used as the background colour for Christian religious mosaics, as it was throughout the Byzantine period.

The decorated late Roman pieces are usually assumed to have been made in and around Rome, especially in the case of portraits of residents there, but also in the Rhineland around Cologne and Augusta Treverorum, modern Trier, which was a centre for other luxury glass products like cage cups. Alexandria is still thought to have been a major centre, and from linguistic analysis of the inscriptions it has been suggested that the technique, and perhaps the actual artists and craftsmen, reached Rome and Germany from there. Yet it may just be a coincidence of survival that the other large body of "middle-class" portraiture from the period is the Fayum mummy portraits from Egypt. Apart from the Rhineland finds discussed below, small numbers of cut-off vessel bases have been found in northern Italy and modern Hungary and Croatia.

The Gennadios medallion in New York, illustrated above, is a fine example of an Alexandrian portrait on blue glass, using a rather more complex technique and naturalistic style than most Roman examples, including painting onto the gold to create shading, and with the Greek inscription showing local dialect features. He had perhaps been given or commissioned the piece to celebrate victory in a musical competition. One of the most famous Alexandrian-style portrait medallions, with an inscription in Egyptian Greek, was later mounted in an Early Medieval crux gemmata in Brescia, in the mistaken belief that it showed the pious empress and Gothic queen Galla Placida (died 450) and her children; in fact the knot in the central figure's dress may mark a devotee of Isis. The portrait in the Brescia medallion also shares clear stylistic features with the Fayum mummy portraits of Roman Egypt, in addition to a Greek inscription in the Alexandrian dialect of Egypt. This is one of a group of 14 pieces dating to the 3rd century AD, all individualized secular portraits of high quality. Yet Jás Elsner (2007) contends that the Brescia medallion, likely depicting a family from Alexandria since the inscription is in the Alexandrian dialect of Greek, has a range of possible dates ranging from the early-3rd to mid-5th century AD, before it found its way to Italy where it adorned a 7th-century Christian cross.

It is thought that the tiny detail of pieces such as these can only have been achieved using lenses. Where the refined "Alexandrian" medallions, wherever they were actually produced, mostly have a simple thin gold line framing the subject, the Roman examples have a variety of heavier frames, often using two round borders, the style of which forms part of efforts to group them by workshop. The level of portraiture is rudimentary, with features, hairstyles and clothes all following stereotypical styles.

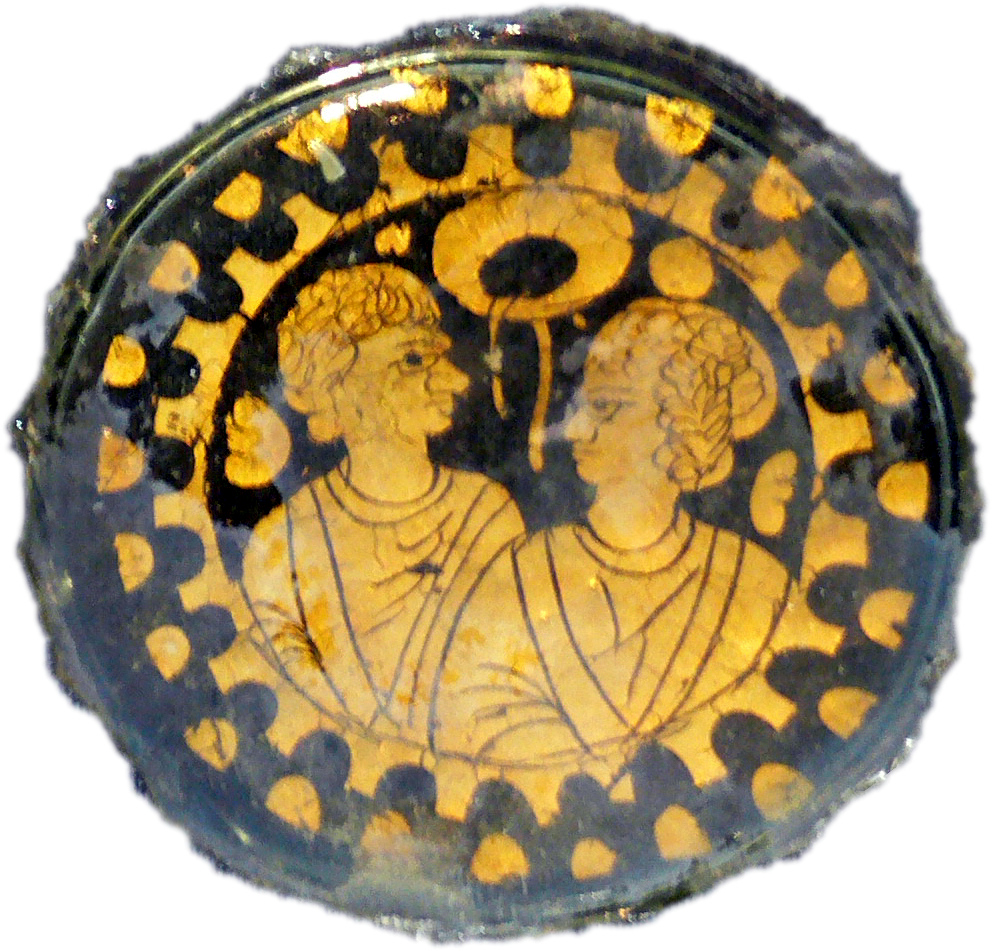
Two Christian saints, 4th century

An "Alexander plate with hunting scene" in the Cleveland Museum of Art is, if genuine, a very rare example of a complete vessel decorated with gold glass, and comes from the upper elite of Roman society. It is a shallow bowl or plate 25.7 cm (10 1/8 inches) in diameter and 4.5 cm (1 3/4 inches) high. The decorated flat roundel in the centre takes about two thirds of the whole diameter. It shows a mounted huntsman with a spear pursuing two elk, while beneath his horse a huntsman on foot with a hound on a leash confronts a wild boar. The Latin inscription "ALEXANDER HOMO FELIX PIE ZESES CUM TUIS" means "Alexander fortunate man, drink, may you live, together with yours". The identity of "Alexander" has been the subject of discussion, but he is on the whole thought to be an unknown aristocrat rather than Alexander the Great or the Emperor Alexander Severus (reigned 232–235). The dish is perhaps slightly later than his reign and at least during his reign he could never be addressed as merely a "man". The Greek drinking toast ZHCAIC given in Latin letters as ZESES, meaning "live!" or "may you live", is a very common part of inscriptions on gold glass, and sometimes the only inscription. It is more common than the Latin equivalent VIVAS, probably because it was considered more refined, somewhat like the modern "bon appétit" used in English. Two glasses including images of Jesus "misspell" "ZESES" as "ZESUS", managing to achieve wordplay between a drinking toast and the name of the Christian saviour.

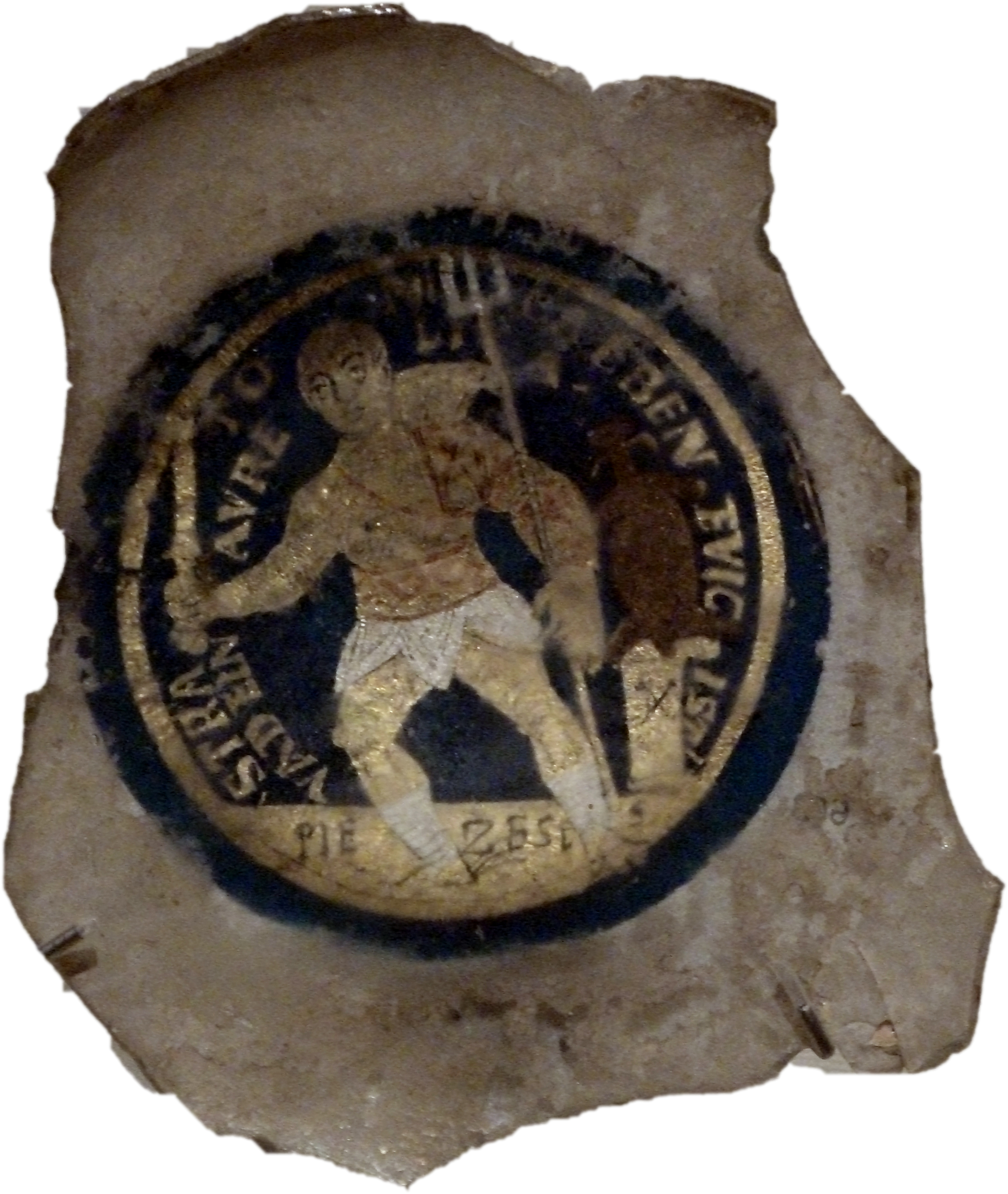
Gladiator in gold glass

Such secular "blessings" are typical, and on roundels made from cups they often urge the owner to drink, even when the iconography is religious. One Jewish example has the usual array of symbols and the inscription "Drink, [so] you may live, Elares". The Wedding at Cana is a popular Christian subject, with one example inscribed "Worthy of your friends, may you live in the peace of God, drink". Another popular phrase is DIGNITAS AMICORUM or "[you are] the honour of your friends". The majority of inscriptions are made up of either names or such conventional expressions, or the two combined. An example inscribed "DIGNITAS AMICORVM PIE ZESES VIVAS" typifies the tendency to pile together the common phrases. The convivial dedications found on so many examples are paralleled by several of the far more luxurious cage cups or diatreta.

One round bottom from a larger bowl found in the catacombs is 10.8 cm (4.3 in) across, and now in the Ashmolean Museum in Oxford. It has five abbreviated scenes from the Old and New Testaments surrounding a married couple in a roundel, with the feet of the outer figures to the centre. A large and complex bowl from Cologne was decorated all over with Christian scenes and Imperial portraits, but presumably because of its size (height 8.6, diameter 11.4 cm) no second layer of glass was fused on, so the gold has now all been lost, though the shapes of the design can be seen. The portraits of the sons of Constantine I allow an unusually precise probable dating to 326, his vicennalia, or the 25th anniversary of his reign. Another complete piece is a paten from the Basilica of St. Severin, Cologne, founded in the 4th century. This is decorated with roundels containing Old Testament scenes and floral motifs. According to the Liber Pontificalis, Pope Zephyrinus, in office from 199 to 217, had approved the use of glass patens, and ones in other glass techniques survive. A variant technique is only known from vessels from Cologne with what have been called "sidewall blobs", where small gold glass medallions with images are fused into the walls of a vessel; one of the few examples was found in the cemetery of St Severin.

== Iconography of the vessel bottoms ==
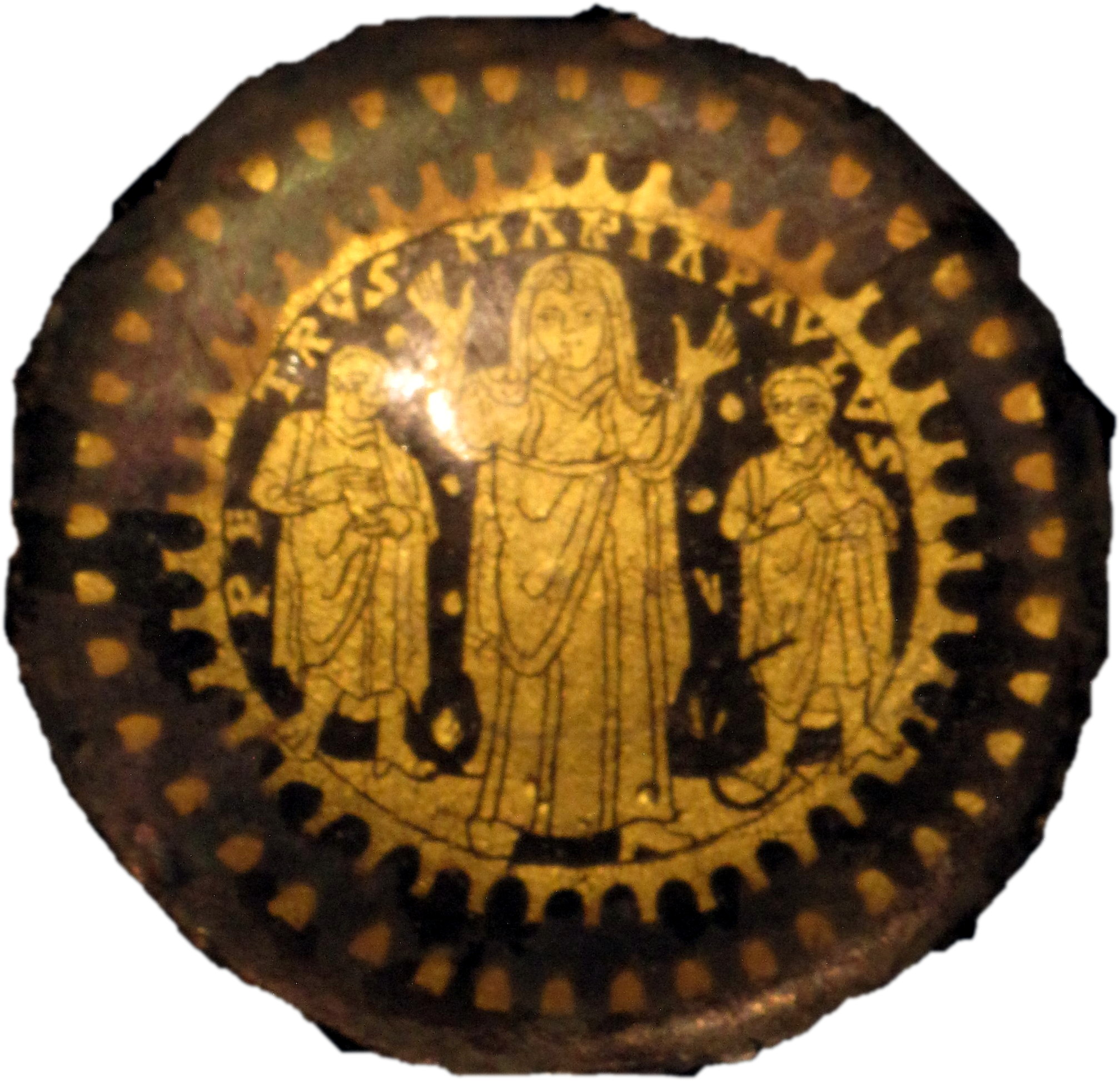
Saint Peter, Virgin Mary in orant pose, Saint Paul, 4th century

Almost all the Roman vessel bottoms have imagery of some sort, and around 240 have legible inscriptions as well. Of these, about half of the total number of gold glasses known, portraits are most common, but there are small narrative scenes, mainly Christian but a few pagan. Portraits of Christian sacred figures are on about half the full corpus. There are a small number of depictions of sports, animals, wreaths and the like, and a single example with a central image of a plant. No Imperial portraits are recorded, nor military scenes; unlike so much Roman public art the glasses concentrate on the private interests of individuals. Apart from a single near-naked Venus and some figures of erotes, sexual themes are another notable absence compared to much Roman art. Most glasses feature a single image occupying most of the round space within the border, but some have a number of small scenes, usually arranged in small circular frames around a central image. Most portraits are between bust and half-length. The small number of glasses with Jewish iconography are covered separately below.

Either portraits or inscriptions naming private individuals are very common, though other examples have no personalizing aspect and were perhaps just bought from a dealer's stock. Portraits of married couples are at first most common, but saints were more numerous towards the end of the period; the two are also often combined. It is not always possible to distinguish the two confidently, despite tituli inscriptions and a convention of using contemporary dress for owners and a conventional out of date costume for sacred figures, even recent male ones such as Pope Damasus I (r. 366–384). Damasus, exceptionally for a contemporary cleric, appears on at least four glasses, or at least it is thought he is who "DAMAS" refers to.

Saints Peter and Paul together are very common, usually facing each other in profile, but sometimes with other figures. Both were martyred in Rome, and especially popular there; other local martyrs such as Agnes are depicted several times, and according to Lucy Grig "the Roman-ness of the saints portrayed on the Roman glasses is striking", and five popes from the 3rd and 4th centuries are probably depicted. Christ is shown in a number of examples, usually as clean-shaven and youthful, as well as figures such as the Good Shepherd which may symbolize him, or in some cases Orpheus or general bucolic imagery. A small Christ may stand between the heads of a married couple, blessing them. Orants perhaps representing the soul of an owner when not identified as a saint, and as in the catacombs always shown as female, appear a number of times, and female saints and the Virgin are always shown in the orant pose.

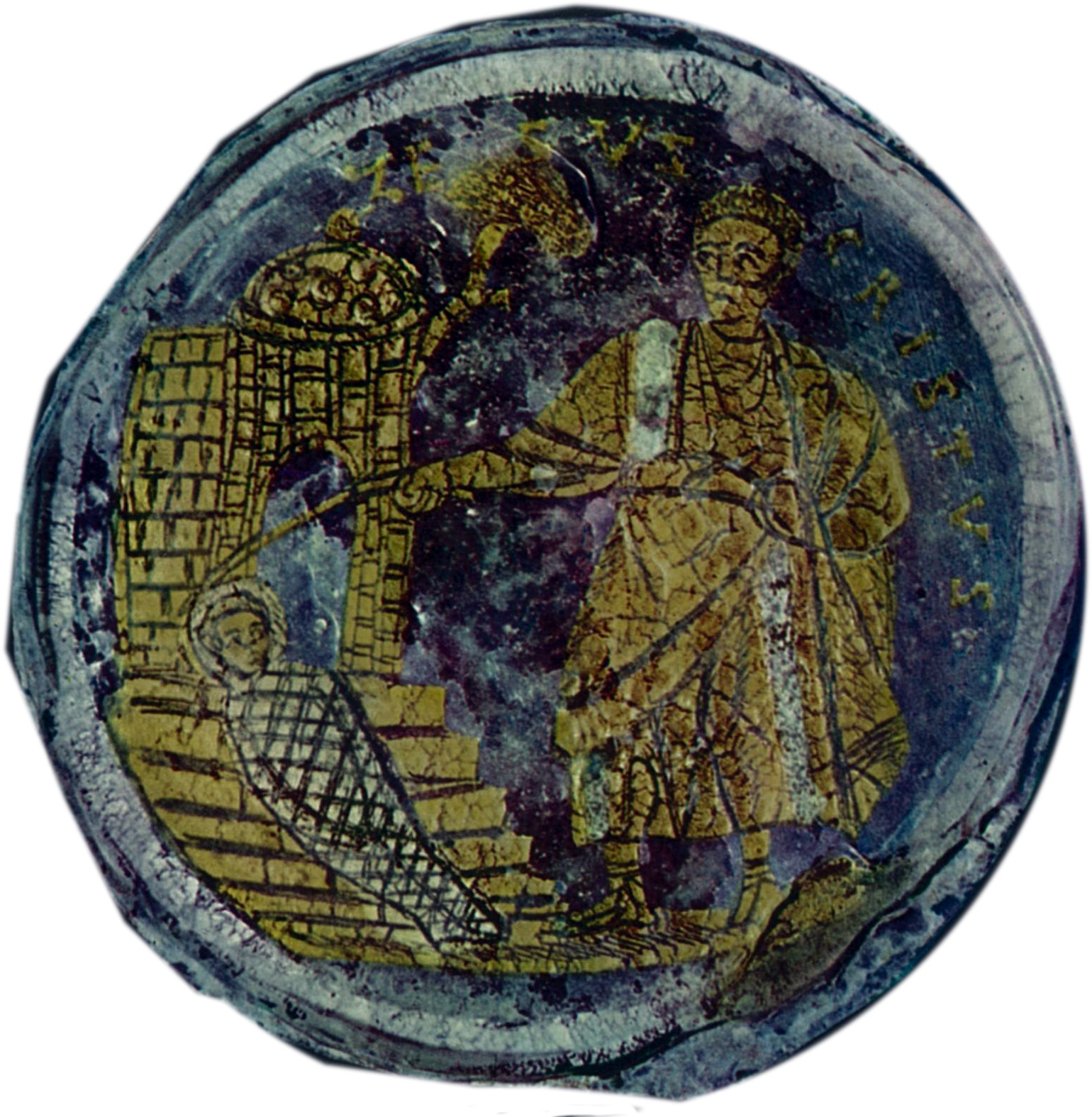
Christian Raising of Lazarus, 4th century

Narrative scenes from the Old Testament are more common than miracles of Christ, as in the catacomb paintings, and the same "abbreviated representations" of scenes of deliverance feature: the story of Jonah, Daniel in the lions' den, the three youths in the Fiery Furnace. The most common scenes in later Christian art, centred around the liturgical calendar, are very rare. There are really only two non-Christian narrative scenes: one labour of Hercules (two more are shown in "sidewall blobs"), and one of Achilles, but a number of "portrait" figures, as with Christian sacred figures often combined with owners.

There are a small number of "agonistic" or sporting scenes, with wrestlers, boxers, one gladiator, and several racing chariot teams. Several of these, like others seeming to represent victory in a musical or dramatic context, feature palms and crowns and may well have been presented to celebrate victory in these fields in some amateur or professional setting, like the Alexandrian Gennadios portrait. Two identical glasses featuring two boxers with a trainer, all named, suggest that the glasses may sometimes have been ordered in sets; one may speculate that this may have been common. Single examples show Athena presiding over shipbuilders, a pair of personifications of Rome and Constantinople, and female figures representing the monetae or mints, which are often shown on coins. A number have animals that may carry symbolic meaning, or objects such as scrolls or wreaths.

The short inscriptions tend to be similar regardless of the content of the image, with names and the "convivial formulae" described above together or separately predominating. A religious implication (as may be intended in vivas or zeses for example) is relatively rarely explicitly stated. The names are in the single cognomen form which is hard to relate to such records as survive, but three glasses can possibly be related to known individuals who were potential owners, and one to a family (that of the poet Ausonius). These persons are rather grand, and one might think belonged to the classes buried in sarcophagi rather than loculi; the glasses perhaps belonged to "amici", clients or dependents, or had passed as gifts or legacies by the subjects. One glass in the British Museum is unusual in a number of respects: between a named couple is a smaller figure of Hercules, and the inscription: "ORFITVS ET CONSTANTIA IN NOMINE HERCVLlS ACERENTINO FELICES BIBATIS" or "Orfitus and Constantia, may you live/drink in happiness in the name of Hercules of Acerentia". This may well represent Memmius Vitruvius Orfitus, prefect of Rome, and his wife. Acerentia in southern Italy had a local cult of Hercules. For some historians Orfitus was "notorious as the propaganda mastermind of the 'pagan revival'" of his day.

== Jewish glasses ==
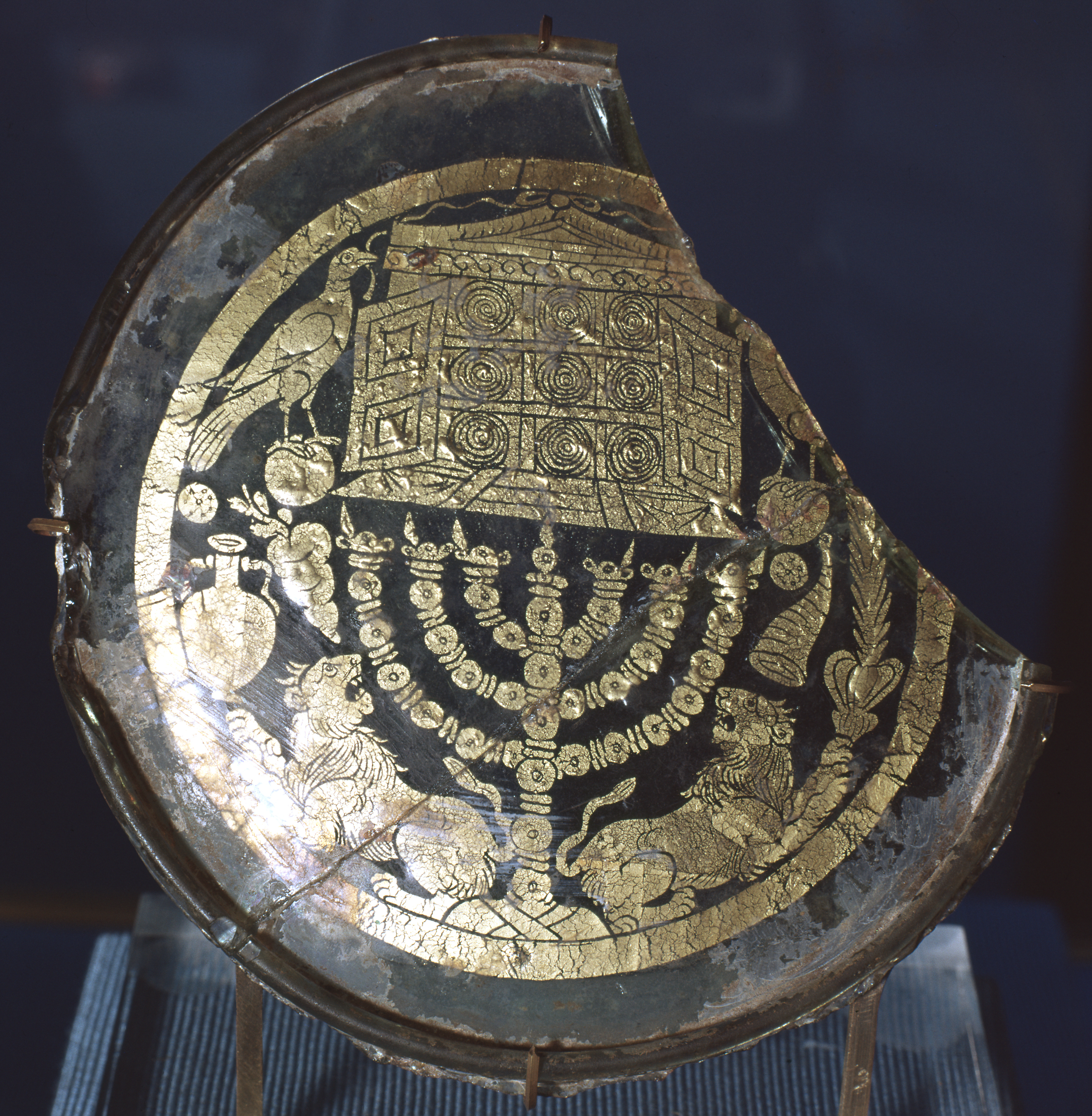
Probably 4th century, open Torah ark, Lions of Judah, peacocks and ritual objects

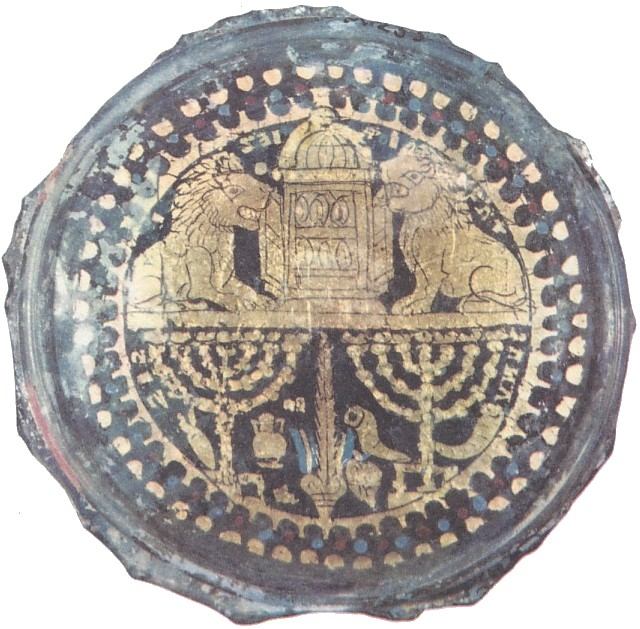
Jewish ritual objects, Rome, 2nd century AD

Only 13 of the more than 500 known Late Roman vessel bottoms are identifiably Jewish, but these have still been said to represent "the most appealing group of Jewish realia that have come down from antiquity". They are all presumed to have been used in the Roman catacombs as grave-markers, though as with the examples identifiable with other religions, the exact find spot and context of the great majority is unrecorded. Rather surprisingly, the only two of the 13 with full histories were found in Christian catacombs, whereas the only gold glass remains found in Jewish catacombs have no Jewish iconography, and show that "some Jews felt no qualm in using gold glasses with pagan iconographical motifs".

Identifiably Jewish roundels do not feature portraits but with one exception have a fairly standard array of religious symbols. The most common arrangement is on two levels, with two Lions of Judah flanking a Torah ark above, and below two menarot, a shofar (rams horn), etrog, lulav and perhaps others of the four Species, scrolls and vases. Not all the tiny symbols can be confidently identified. Alternatively, the objects are all in the top tier, above a banqueting scene. The single exception to such compositions has what is thought to be a representation of the Temple of Jerusalem, perhaps representing the feast of Purim.

Most scholars are confident that Jewish customers used the same workshops as those of the other religions, who presumably kept patterns for designs for all religions, or were provided with sketches. Some of the attempts to group glasses by workshop attribute Jewish glasses and those of other religions to the same workshop. Apart from the use of symbols rather than human figures, the Jewish glasses seem to have been used in very much the same way as those from other religious groups, which is also characteristic of other classes of Jewish artefacts from Rome at this time, where the Jewish community adopted many aspects of the general Roman way of life. Of the 13 known, five have inscriptions including the phrase "pie zeses" (see above) and two "anima dulcis" (literally "sweet soul", equating to "sweetheart"), both very common phrases in Christian and pagan inscriptions. The rarer phrase "vivas cum ..." ("live with ...") is also found on Jewish and non-Jewish glasses. They would seem to have been given as gifts on the same sort of occasions, and there is evidence that Roman Jews shared the general Roman custom of New Year present-giving.

== Later uses and collections ==
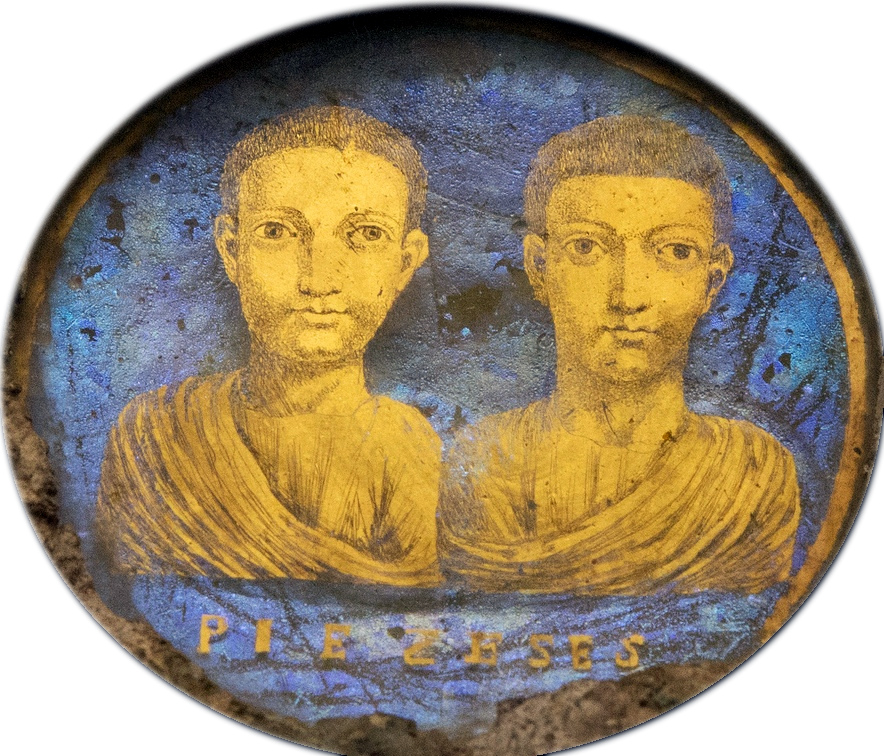
4th-century portrait, now in Bologna

The technique continued to be used for mosaic tesserae, and at times for pieces that remained relatively large, for example in a small tile in New York with a pattern forming a cross, perhaps from a Syrian church of the 9th to 12th centuries. A small group of Islamic vessels are decorated with mostly simplified vegetal motifs and probably date to the 10th century from Syria; the most complete ones are decorated over a large curved area and must have been made by using a "double vessel" method. In both respects these are closer to the Hellenistic vessels than most Roman ones.

From at least the 17th century, the Roman glasses attracted antiquarian interest and they began to be removed from the catacombs, in a largely disorganized and unrecorded fashion; now only a "handful" remain in their original position in the catacomb walls. The first significant publication on them was by Filippo Buonarroti in 1716, Osservazioni sopra alcuni frammenti di vasi antichi di vetro ornate di figure trovati nei cimiteri di Roma ("Observations on some fragments of antique glass vases decorated with figures, found in the cemeteries of Rome"), in which he made the extraordinary, almost proto-Romantic assertion that the aesthetic crudity of early Christian art, often remarked by connoisseurs of Roman arts, had served to intensify the piety of the worshipper, an early expression of feeling for primitive art. After other studies, the Italian Jesuit Raffaele Garrucci published the first illustrated survey in 1858, with an expanded second edition in 1864. In the 19th century a number of imitations, copies and downright forgeries of Roman pieces were made, mostly in Murano off Venice, by firms such as Salviati. The first major public exhibition of these seems to have been at the Exposition Universelle of 1878 in Paris, by Italian firms.

A number of museums around the world have examples of Roman vessel bottoms. The largest collection is in the Vatican Museums, with the 60 pieces of Late Antique glass in the British Museum the second largest. A research project on their collection was due to finish in 2010 (see further reading below). The Wilshere Collection in the Ashmolean is the third largest, with some 34 pieces. The Corning Museum of Glass has 18 examples and the Metropolitan Museum in New York nearly as many. The most recent of many catalogues since the 18th century are by C.R. Morey in 1959, with 460 Roman vessel bases, against 426 in S. Smith's thesis of 2000. The corpus continues to be expanded by occasional new finds.
