= Jonas Zeuner =

German artist and engraver

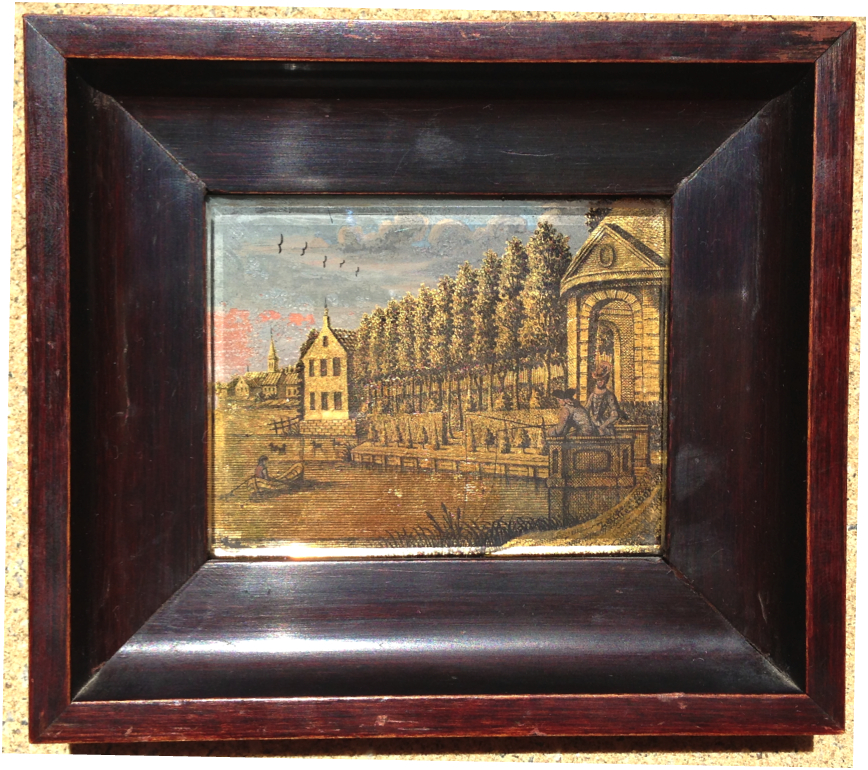
A Verre églomisé by Jonas Zeuner

Jonas Zeuner (Kassel 1727–1814), was an artist and engraver.

Zeuner arrived in Amsterdam around 1750 although his first recorded work dates from after 1770. He perfected techniques for engraving in gold and silver leaf, known as verre églomisé. His jewel-like pictures were greatly admired in fashionable Dutch circles. Zeuner's oeuvre consists mainly of town views, largely of Amsterdam, Haarlem, Utrecht and Groningen. However, he also specialised in views of canal and harbour scenes as well as country houses, such as those on the Vecht and the Amstel near Amsterdam.

Jonas Zeuner was not the most prolific of painters. He is known to have created about 170 paintings during his lifetime. Zeuner used the distinctive technique of combining oil paint and engraved gold and silver leaf on glass. The result was often breathtaking. Wonderful examples of Zeuner's work are now on permanent display at museums, including the collections of Rijksmuseum, Amsterdam and the Corning Museum of Glass, Corning, New York.

There are some paintings by Zeuner showing scenes of England. Zeuner is believed to have lived in England between 1802 and 1806, during which time he produced several works depicting the English countryside and cities.

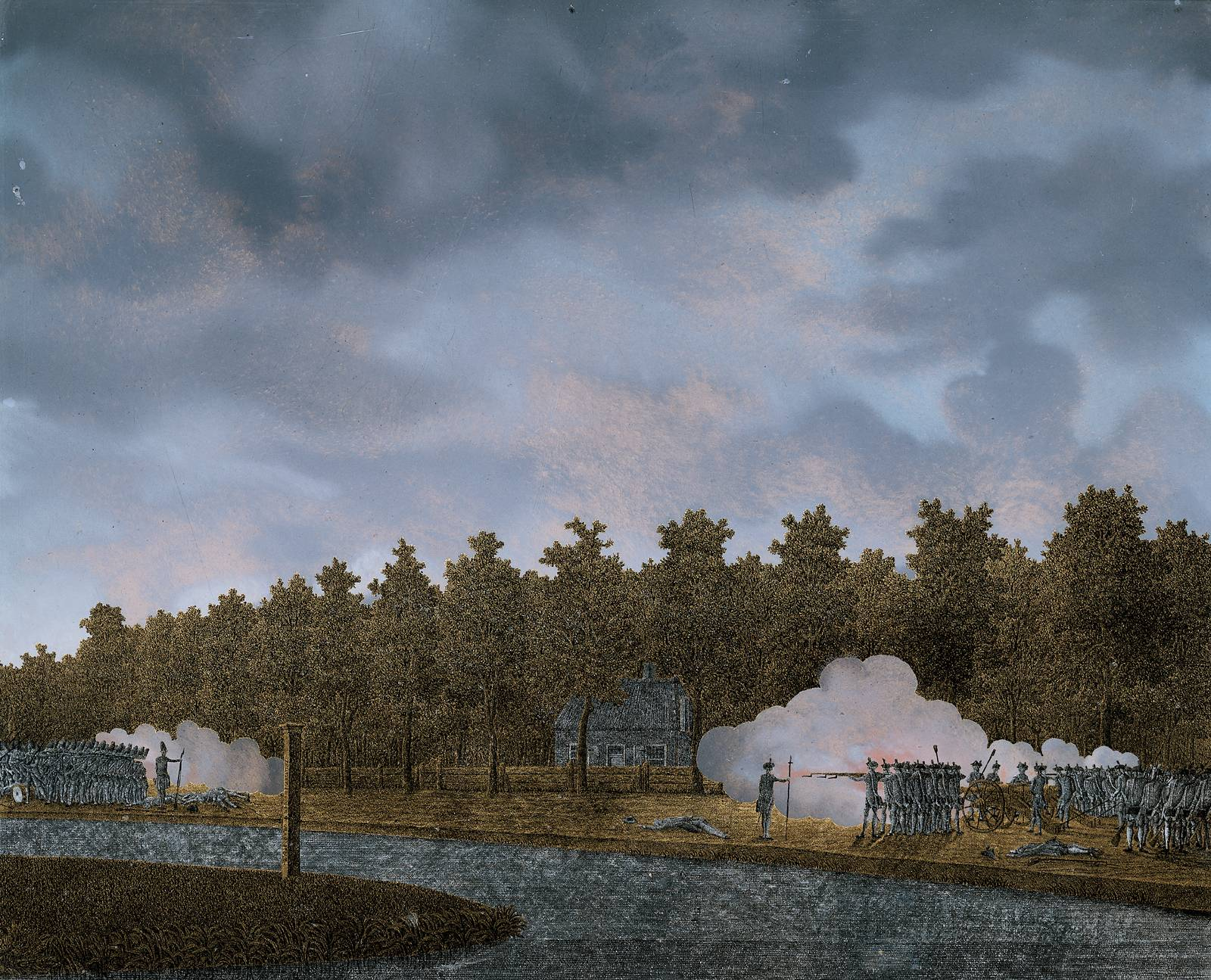
Exchange of Fire on the Vaartse Rijn near Jutphaas.

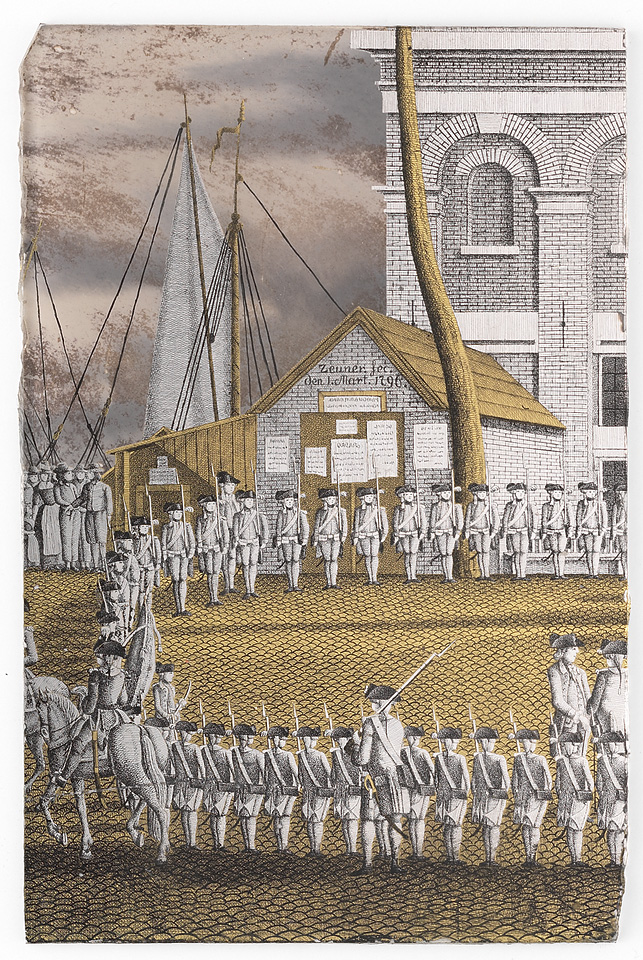
Zeuner's painting Pupils lined up at the Zeerecht building in Amsterdam.
