= Verre églomisé =

Glass decorating technique

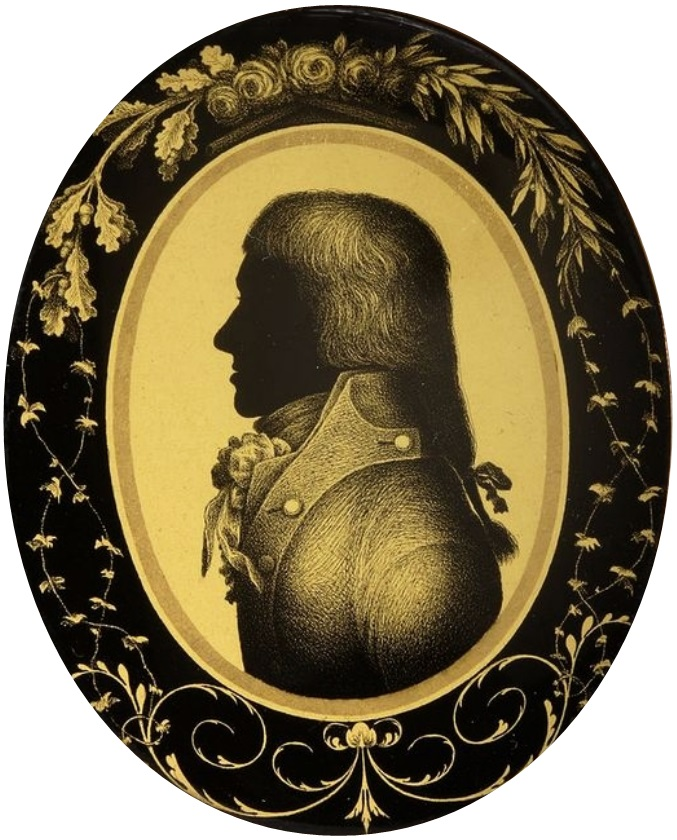
A verre églomisé profile miniature (c. 1800), National Museum in Warsaw

Verre églomisé [vɛʁ e.ɡlɔ.mi.ze] is a French term referring to the process of applying both a design and gilding onto the rear face of glass to produce a mirror finish. The name is derived from the 18th-century French decorator and art-dealer Jean-Baptiste Glomy (1711–1786), who was responsible for its revival.

Glomy's technique was a relatively simple one of applying decorative designs in a combination of plain colour and gilding, usually to glass picture frames. However, over time it has come to be used to describe nearly any process involving back-painted and gilded glass, however elaborate.

The technique of back-painting glass actually dates back to pre-Roman eras. One of the key historical periods of the art was in Italy during the 13th to 16th centuries. Small panels of glass with designs formed by engraved gilding were applied to reliquaries and portable altars. The method used is described by Cennino Cennini. Other practitioners include Jonas Zeuner and Hans Jakob Sprungli (1559–1637).

It has also been used throughout Europe since the 15th century, appearing in paintings, furniture, drinking glasses and similar vessels, and jewellery. It is also often seen in the form of decorative panels of mirrors, clock faces, and in more recent history, as window signs and advertising mirrors.

The technique was explored by the Blue Rider group of artists in the 1920s who turned what had been a folk art into fine art. Indeed, artists of the caliber of Kandinsky, Marc, Klee and Gabriele Münter produced glass paintings. there are very few artists using the technique as a fine art - the Irish artist Yanny Petters is one of them. However, as part of the renaissance in traditional techniques, there are various commercial artists who use this technique.

In the gilding process, the silver, gold or other metal leaf is fixed using a gelatin adhesive which, after steaming, results in a mirror-like, reflective finish. The design can be applied by various techniques, often by reverse painting prior to gilding, or by engraving the design into the gilded layer, or even into the glass. When painting an elaborate design such as a flower, the artist's natural methodology is reversed, with highlights applied first and the background applied last.

The metal leaf may also be applied using oil-based adhesives (goldsize varnish) to achieve a matte finish. It is to be distinguished from "sandwiched" gold glass where gold leaf is glued to a piece of glass, and often then scraped off to form a design, and a further layer of hot glass is then applied on top and fused to seal the gold inside.

In recent years, the term Verre Églomisé has also been used to describe gilded and distressed mirrors which have no actual design or pattern applied, but this is taking it a further step away from its source. A better term for these would be "Distressed Hand-Gilded Mirror".
