= Back painted glass =

Back painted glass is any form of clear glass that is painted from the back side and viewed from the front side, or "first surface" side. Back painted glass is widely used for architectural spandrel glass, colored glass walls for interior glazing, colored glass back splashes, glass markerboards and dry erase boards, colored glass counter tops, shower walls, artistic glass, auto glass, marine glass, aero space glass, and more. Back painted glass is a modern alternative to other surfacing materials such as tiles and laminates in the world's decorative and architectural industries.
