= Raffaele Garrucci =

Italian Christian art historian

Raffaele Garrucci (22 January 1812 – 5 May 1885) was a historian of Christian art.

== Biography ==
He was born in Naples to a wealthy family, entered the Society of Jesus at the age of fifteen, and was professed on 19 March 1853.

He taught in several Jesuit schools, and lectured in rhetoric, classical languages, Hebrew and archaeology.

He devoted himself to the study of the Church Fathers, also to Pagan and Christian antiquities; he and Giovanni Battista de Rossi became the principal disciples of Giuseppe Marchi. On his many journeys through Italy, France, Germany, and Spain, he collected much material for his archaeological publications.

He started to publish in 1854 and continued to write for the rest of his life.

Garrucci died in Rome in 1885.

== Works ==
In 1854 he wrote for Charles Cahier's Mélanges d'Archéologie, a study on Phrygian syncretism. Soon after he edited the notes of Jean L'Heureux on the catacombs of Rome (in manuscript since 1605); later an essay on the gilded glasses of the catacombs (1858), and another on the Jewish cemetery at the Vigna Randanini.

In 1872 he began the publication of a monumental history of early Christian antiquities, entitled Storia dell'arte cristiana. It was destined to include all works of sculpture, painting, and the minor and industrial arts, during the first eight centuries of the Christian Era. It is a general history of early Christian art, and contains five hundred finely engraved plates and explanatory text. Storia dell’arte cristiana ran to six volumes. Five of the six volumes contain, respectively, the catacomb-frescoes - and paintings from other quarters - gold glasses, mosaics, sarcophagi, and non-sepulchral sculptures. The first volume is devoted to the theoretical part of the work, i.e. to a history of Christian art properly so called. In this vast collection Garrucci re-edited to some extent materials taken from earlier works. For hitherto unedited materials he used photographs or reproductions of some other kind. His engravings are not always very accurate, and in point of finish are inferior to those obtained by more modern processes.

The list of his publications covers 118 numbers on Sommervogel, Bibliothèque de la compagnie de Jésus (Brussels 1902), III. Among them are the aforementioned Storia dell'arte cristiana nei primi otto secoli della chiesa (6 vols. Prato 1872—81); Dissertazioni archeologiche di vario argomento (2 vols., Rome 1864-65); Le monete dell'Italia antica, Raccolta generale (Rome, 1885).
