= List of rivers of Puducherry =

This is a list of the rivers in Puducherry, India.

== Puducherry Region ==
- Gingee River
- Guduvaiyar River
- Malattar River
- Pambaiyar River
- Pennaiyar River

== Karaikal Region ==
- Arasalar River
- Nandalar River
- Nattar River
- Noolaar River
- Puravadayanar River
- Thirumalairajan River
- Vanjiar River

== Mahe Region ==
- Mahé River
- Ponniyar River

== Yanam Region ==
- Goutami branch of Godavari River
- Koringa River

== See also ==
- List of Lakes in Puducherry
