= Hwangnam-daechong Roman Glassware =

Roman pitcher and three cups found in South Korea

Glass Ewer and Cups from the South Mound of Hwangnamdaechong Tomb
- 황남대총 남분 유리병 및 잔 (皇南大塚 南墳 琉璃甁 및 盞)
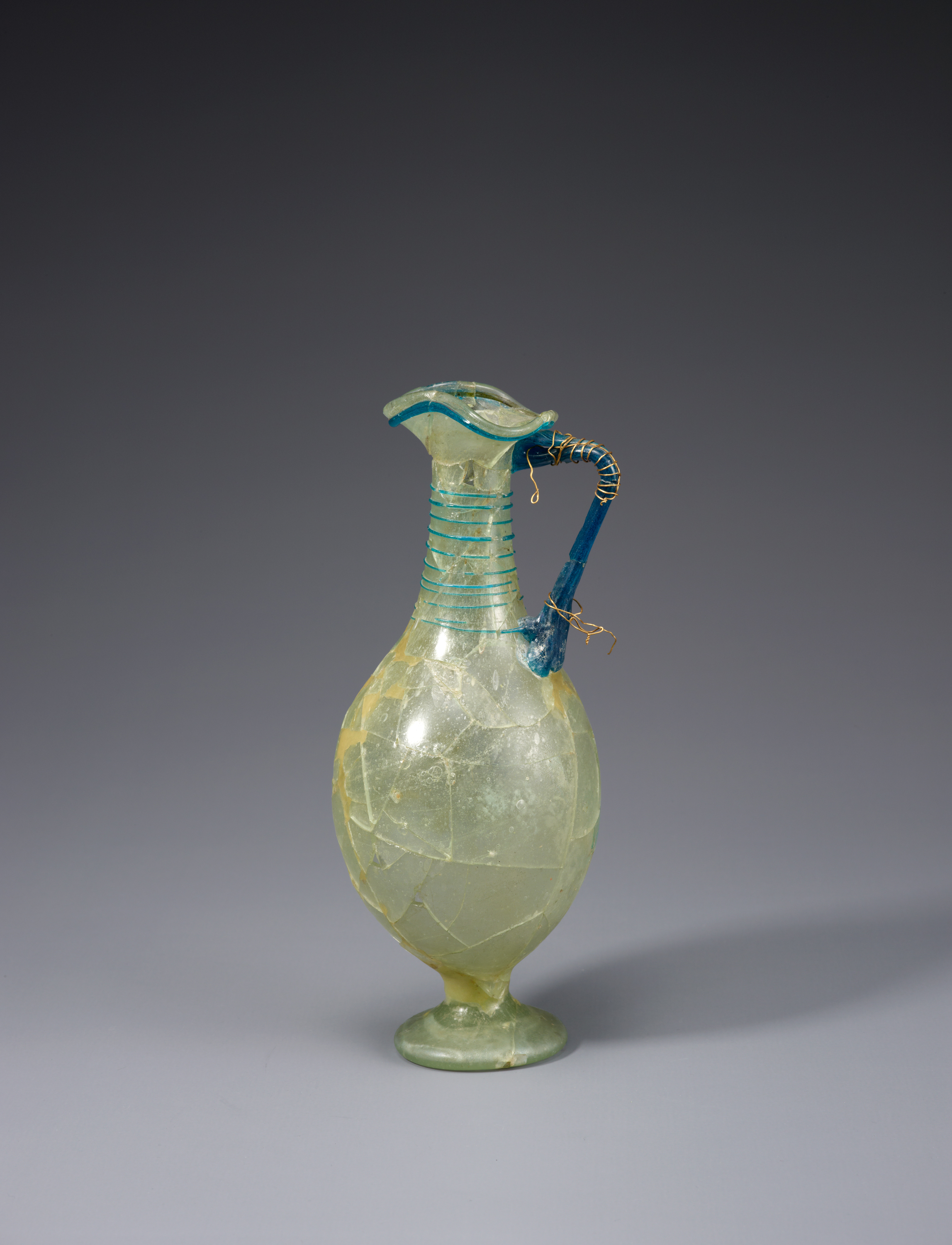
- Type: Roman glass
- Material: glass, glaze, gold wire
- Size: Ewer: 25 cm × 9.5 cm diameter; Cup I: 12.5 cm × 10 cm diameter; Cup II: 8 cm × 10.5 cm diameter; Cup III 10.4 cm × 9.5 cm diameter
- Created: Roman Syria
- Discovered: 1975; Hwangnam-dong, Gyeongju, North Gyeongsang Province, South Korea
- Present location: National Museum of Korea, Seoul
- Classification: National Treasure
- Identification: 193
- Culture: Roman, Silla

Hwangnam-daechong Roman Glassware, officially Glass Ewer and Cups from the South Mound of Hwangnamdaechong Tomb (Korean: 황남대총 남분 유리병 및 잔; Hanja: 皇南大塚 南墳 琉璃甁 및 盞) are a set of Roman glassware consisting of one ewer and three cups discovered in 1975 in the Hwangnam-daechong Silla dynasty tombs in Gyeongju, North Gyeongsang Province, renowned for its burial crowns. Identified as Late Roman with pieces dating to the late 4th century, its importation into Korea attests to extensive trade along the Silk Road. It was designated as National Treasure No. 193 on 7 December 1978, and is owned by the Gyeongju National Museum, but is displayed at the National Museum of Korea.

== Description ==
The Silla Kingdom is renowned for its extensive connections to Eurasia, shown by the rich array of grave goods found in the Royal Gyeongju tombs, which were excavated in the 1970s. In the history of the Wuhuan, Xianbei, and Dongyi in Fascicle 30 of the Records of the Three Kingdoms, it is mentioned that "Koreans love to wear jewelry with glass more than jewelry made with gold or silver".

The earliest known pieces of glass found in Korea date to the 3rd century BC, primarily long beads made with lead-barium glass, imported from China. Up to the 7th century, beads were also identified as coming from Southeast Asia (some from Java and Timor) and India (through Arikamedu), coming in shades of yellow, blue, green, red, black, white, and violet. Domestic and imported glass formed many of the necklaces found with the royal tombs, as well as that of the gogok. The Baekje kingdom developed a reputation for developing domestic glass manufacture, setting aside the imports for royalty.

The glass ewer, known as a "phoenix-shaped glass pitcher" was dug up from the Hwangnam-daechong tomb in 1975 in Hwangnam-dong, and intrigued scholars due to its foreign nature. The excavation of the Silla tombs revealed a total of 30 glass vessels, among them some cups from the southern mound of Hwangnam-daechong (designated Tomb 98), which reconstructed the whereabouts of the glassware.

Study of the glassware extended beyond the tombs to other locations along the Silk Road, with similar matching patterns discovered between tomb finds in Kazakhstan which resembled a Silla cup found in the Sebongchong tomb, a neighboring burial to Hwangnam-daechong. While Roman glass changed hands throughout the Silk Road, it is noted that none was found in sites dating to the Northern Wei or the Song dynasty, although a domestic analogue was found from a tomb in Datong, Shanxi Province. Some of the other glassware in the Silla tombs have chemical compositions resembling Sasanian glass.

Of the four known sources of Roman Empire studios (Rome, Alexandria, Cologne, and Syria), it was determined that the ewer is of Syrian origin.

=== Glassware set ===
The glassware set consists of the ewer, measuring 25 cm × 9.5 cm (9.8 in × 3.7 in) in diameter, Cup I (12.5 cm × 10 cm, 4.9 in × 3.9 in), Cup II (8 cm × 10.5 cm, 3.1 in × 4.1 in), and Cup III (10.5 cm × 9.5 cm, 4.1 in × 3.7 in).

The ewer, dated to the late 4th century, is shaped like an ellipse and is of a soft-green color, the top resembles a beak and is used for pouring water. On the handle, gold wire is wrapped around it as part of a repair before its deposit in the tomb. Cup I (late 4th century) is broad on top, and narrow on the bottom, latticed in texture on the bottom half with a blue rim and a wave pattern on the top half. Cup II (late 4th century) has a thick rim, and has a dent in the middle of the base. Cup III is light green in color with a broad-cubic rim. They were all damaged and cracked upon their discovery in situ but have been reassembled to their original shape. The glassware set was deposited in the burial mound in the 5th century during a time of good relations between Gogoryeo and Silla, which researchers speculate date to the rule of Naemul of Silla to Nulji of Silla (c. 450 AD).

== Gallery ==
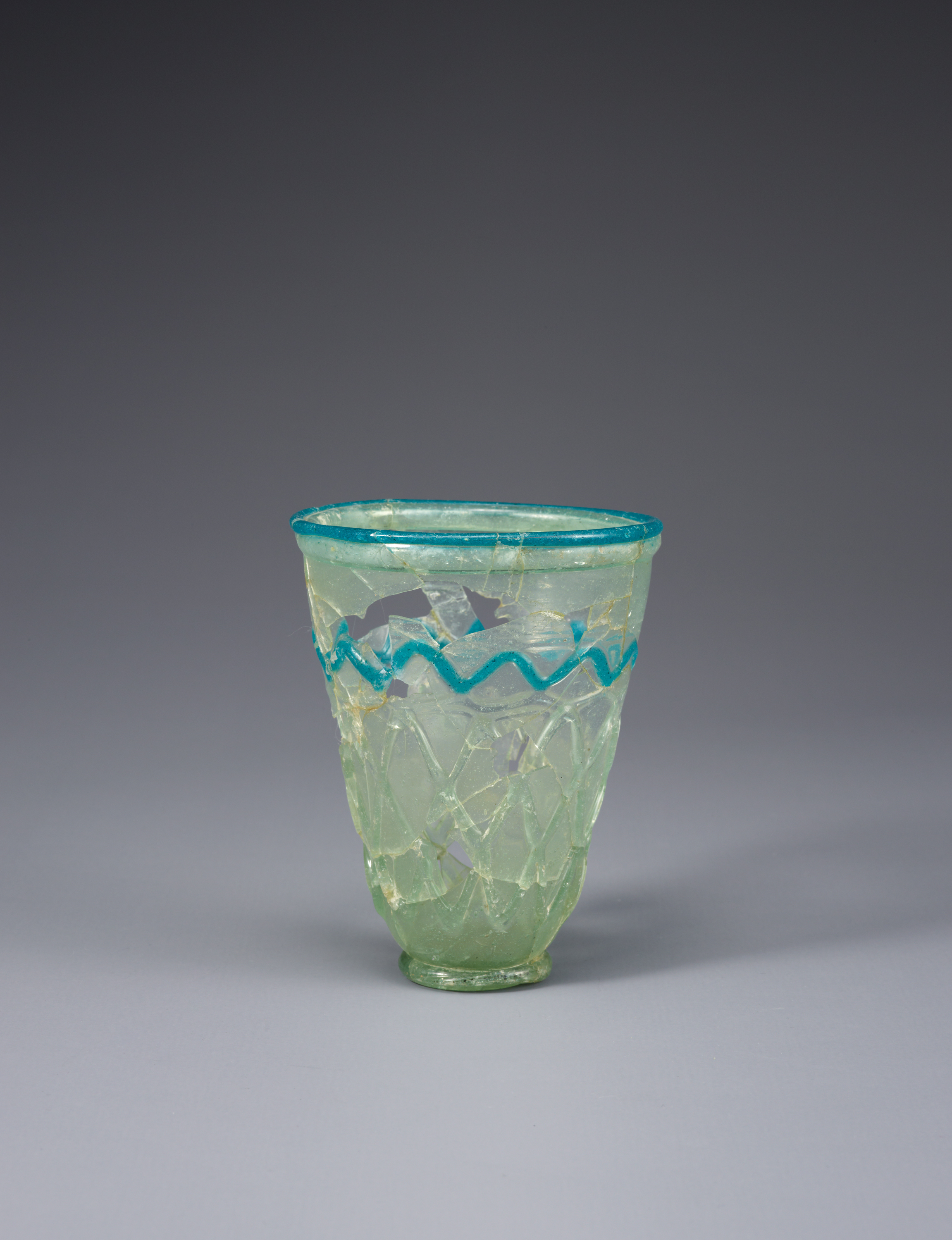
Cup I

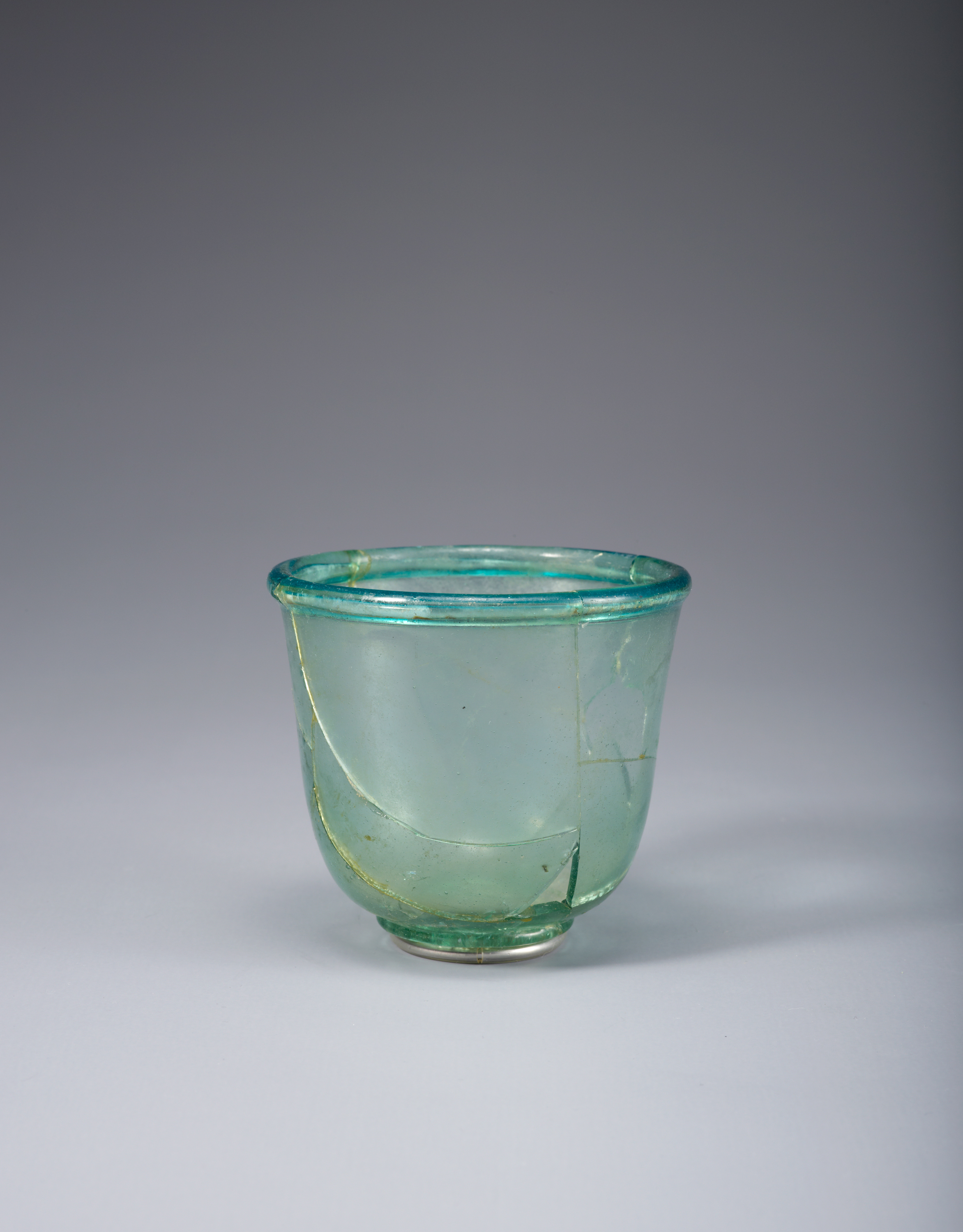
Cup II

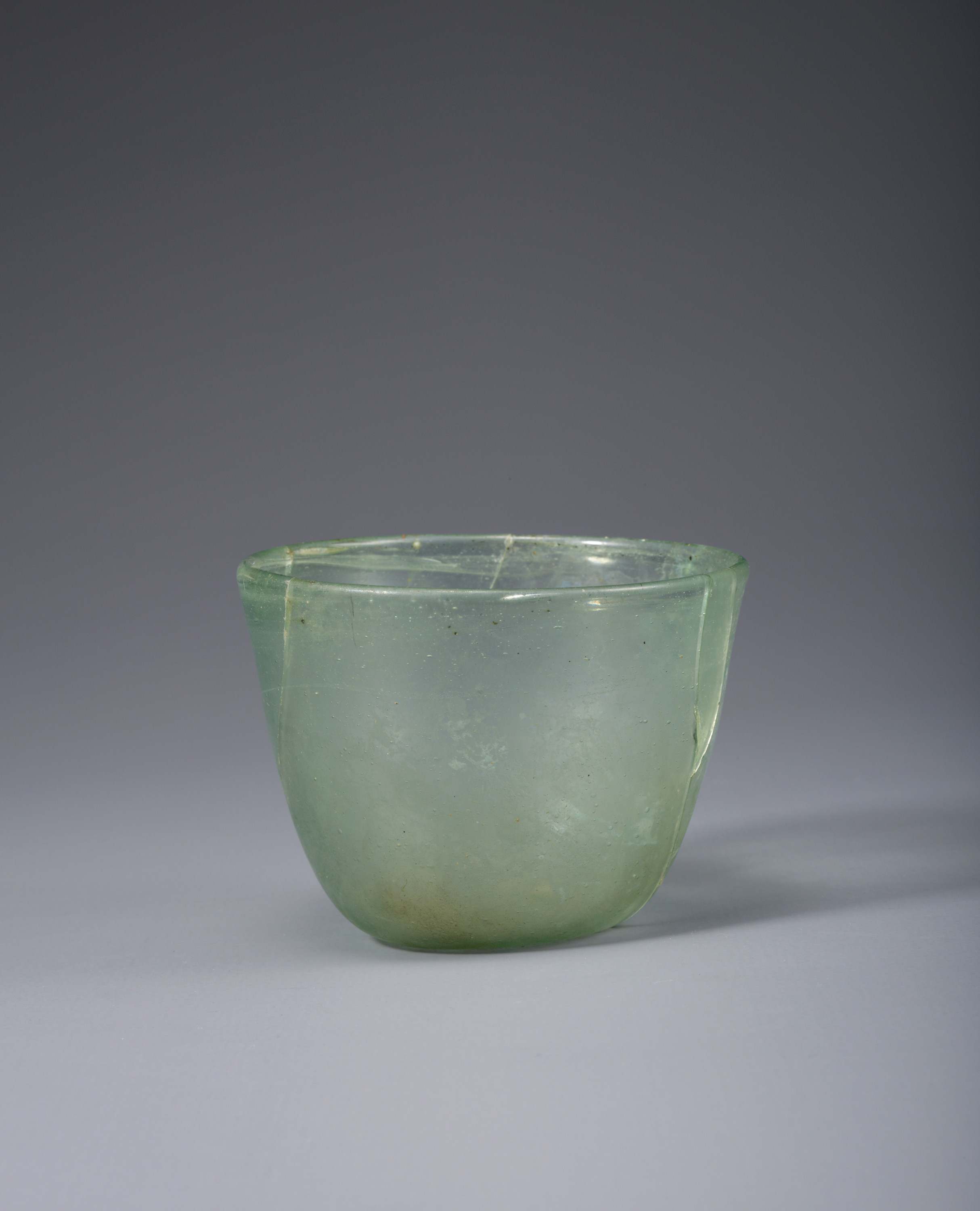
Cup III
