= Ariyankuppam River =

River in Puducherry, India

- Location of mouth

Location
- Country: India
- Territory: Puducherry

Physical characteristics
- Mouth
  - location: Bay of Bengal
  - coordinates: 11.90616890748764°N 79.83048701259104°E

Ariyankuppam River is a distributary of Sankaraparani River. It branches off Sankaraparani near Thirukanchi. Due to property development, its origin was cut off. Thengaithittu Langoon is found in this river. Arikamedu is the major tourist spot in the river. Ariyankuppam River drains into Bay of Bengal at Puducherry Fishing Harbour.

== See also ==
- List of rivers of Puducherry
