= Roman glass =

Ancient glass

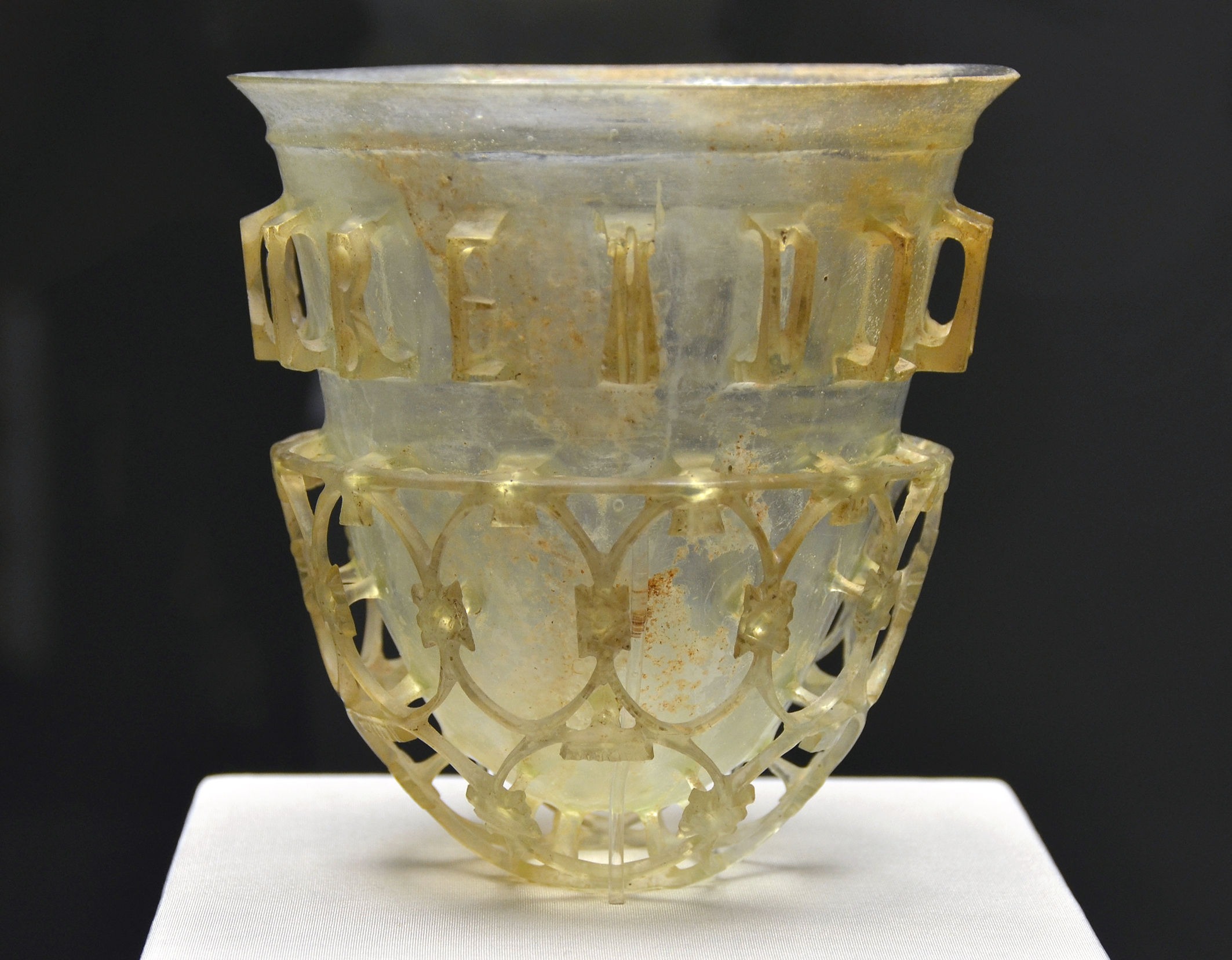
Cage cup from Cologne, dated to the mid-4th century. Collection Staatliche Antikensammlung, Munich

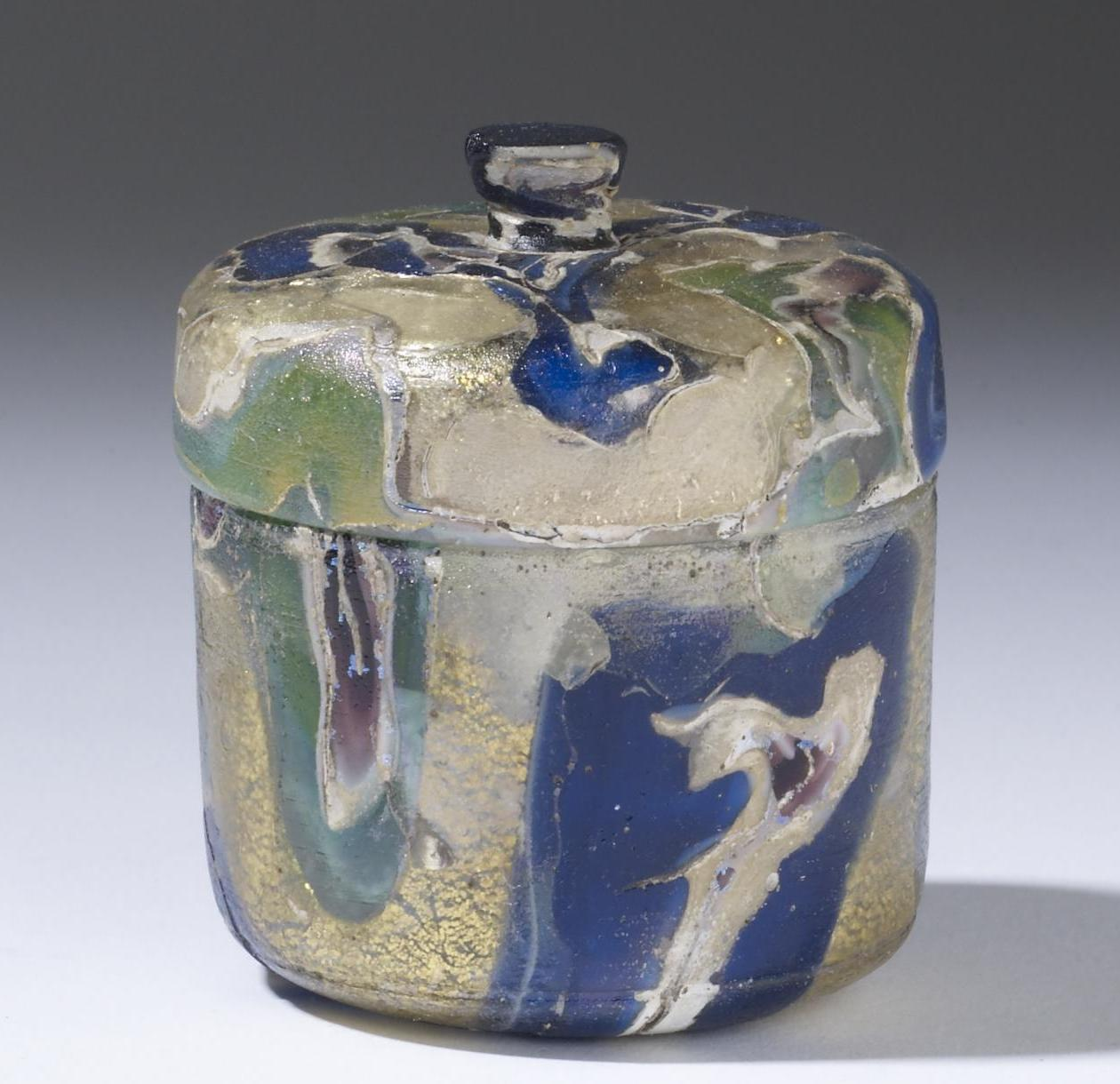
This pyxis is exemplary of luxury Roman glassware, c. late 1st century BC. Walters Art Museum, Baltimore

Roman glass objects have been recovered across the Roman Empire in domestic, industrial and funerary contexts. Glass was used primarily for the production of vessels, although mosaic tiles and window glass were also produced. Roman glass production developed from Hellenistic technical traditions, initially concentrating on the production of intensely coloured cast glass vessels.

However, during the 1st century AD the industry underwent rapid technical growth that saw the introduction of glass blowing and the dominance of colourless or 'aqua' glasses. Production of raw glass was undertaken in geographically separate locations to the working of glass into finished vessels, and by the end of the 1st century AD large scale manufacturing resulted in the establishment of glass as a commonly available material in the Roman world, and one which also had technically very difficult specialized types of luxury glass, which must have been very expensive, and competed with silver and gold as elite tableware.

== Growth of the Roman glass industry ==
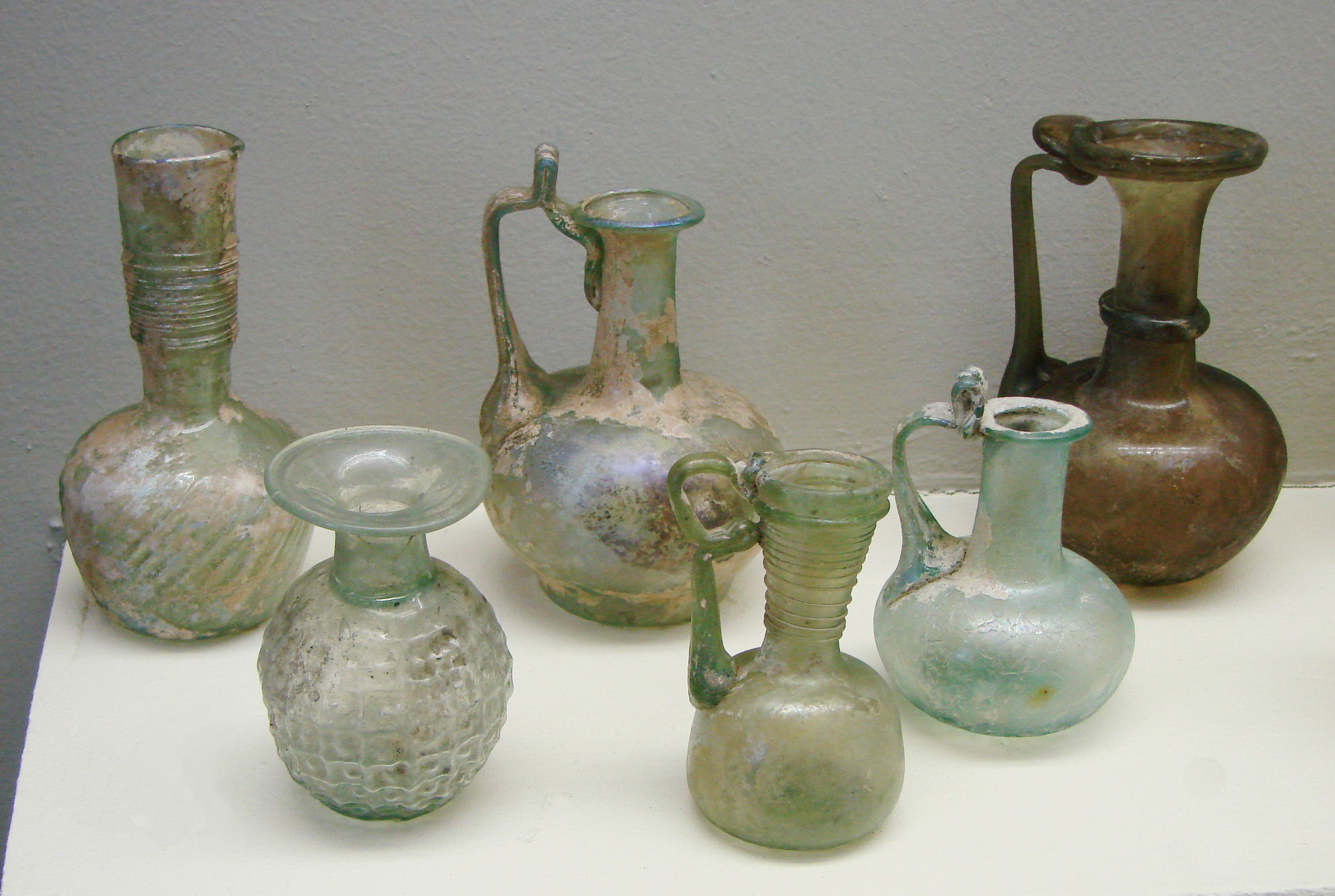
Roman glass from the 2nd century

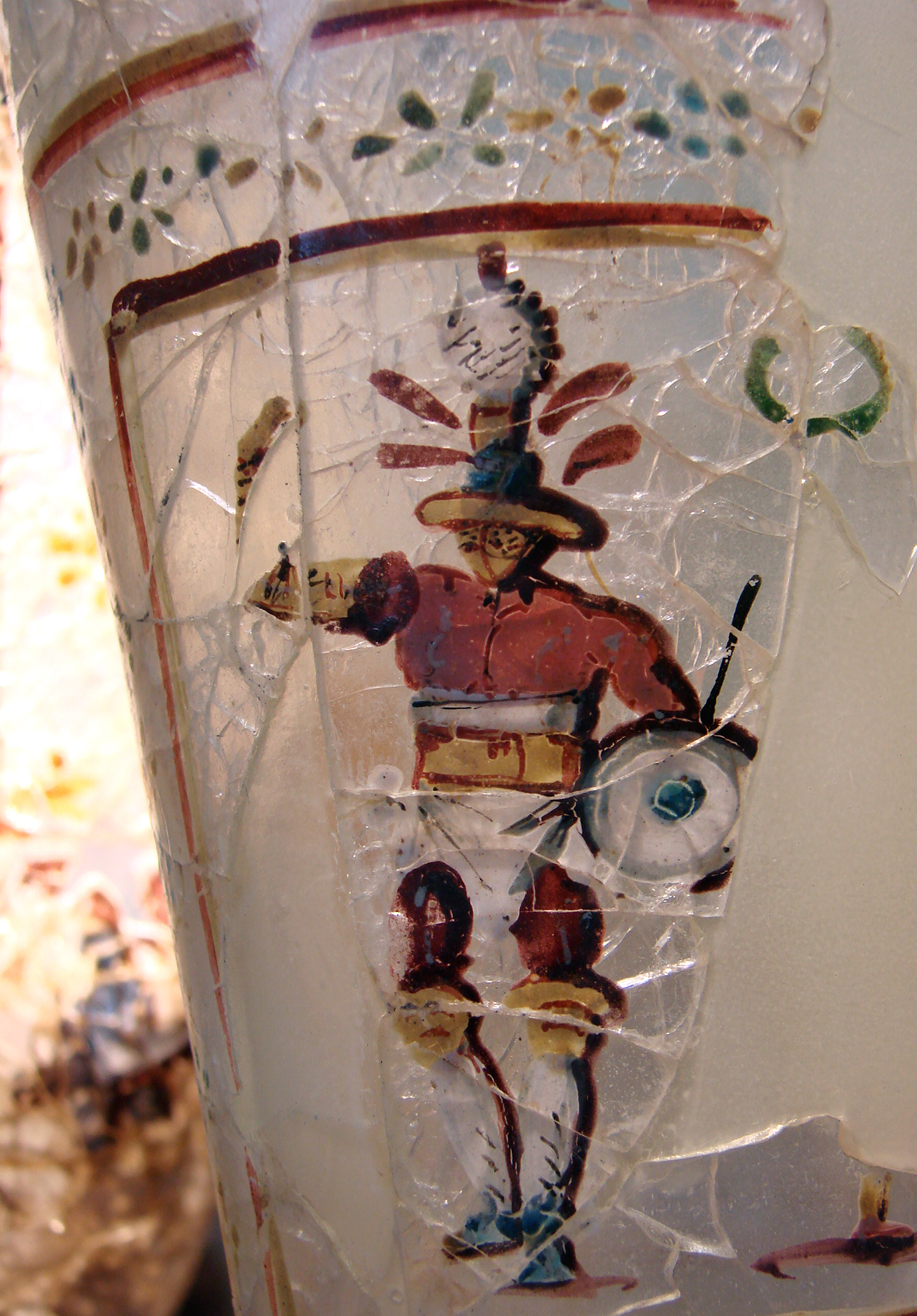
Enamelled glass depicting a gladiator, found at Begram, Afghanistan, which was once part of the Greco-Bactrian Kingdom, but was ruled by the Kushan Empire during the contemporaneous Roman Principate period, to which the glass belongs, 52–125 AD (although there is some scholarly debate about the precise dating).

Despite the growth of glass working in the Hellenistic World and the growing place of glass in material culture, at the beginning of the 1st century AD there was still no Latin word for it in the Roman world. However, glass was being produced in Roman contexts using primarily Hellenistic techniques and styles (see glass, history) by the late Republican period. The majority of manufacturing techniques were time-consuming, and the initial product was a thick-walled vessel which required considerable finishing. This, combined with the cost of importing natron for the production of raw glass, contributed to the limited use of glass and its position as an expensive and high-status material.

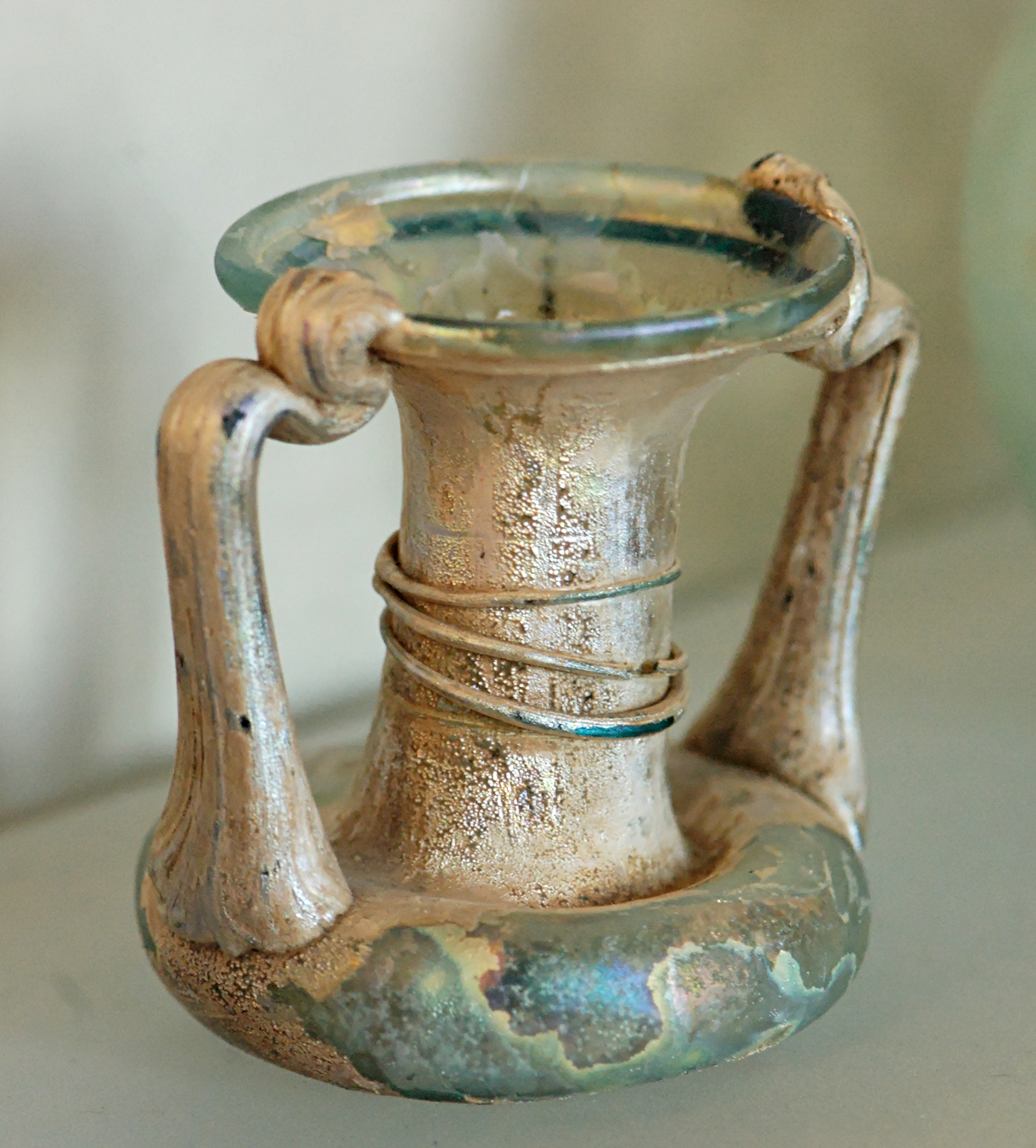
A double-handled glass vial from Syria, c. 4th century AD

The glass industry was therefore a relatively minor craft during the Republican period; although, during the early decades of the 1st century AD the quantity and diversity of glass vessels available increased dramatically. This was a direct result of the massive growth of the Roman influence at the end of the Republican period, the Pax Romana that followed the decades of civil war, and the stabilisation of the state that occurred under Augustus' rule. Still, Roman glasswares were already making their way from Western Asia (i.e. the Parthian Empire) to the Kushan Empire in Afghanistan and India and as far as the Han Empire of China. The first Roman glass found in China came from an early 1st-century BC tomb at Guangzhou, ostensibly via the South China Sea. One particular set found as far in Gyeonggi Province in the royal tombs of the Silla Kingdom in Korea are designated a National Treasure.

In addition to this a major new technique in glass production had been introduced during the 1st century AD. Glassblowing allowed glass workers to produce vessels with considerably thinner walls, decreasing the amount of glass needed for each vessel. Glass blowing was also considerably quicker than other techniques, and vessels required considerably less finishing, representing a further saving in time, raw material and equipment. Although earlier techniques dominated during the early Augustan and Julio-Claudian periods, by the middle to late 1st century AD earlier techniques had been largely abandoned in favour of blowing.

As a result of these factors, the cost of production was reduced and glass became available for a wider section of society in a growing variety of forms. By the mid-1st century AD this meant that glass vessels had moved from a valuable, high-status commodity, to a material commonly available: "a [glass] drinking cup could be bought for a copper coin" (Strabo, Geographica XVI.2). This growth also saw the production of the first glass tesserae for mosaics, and the first window glass, as furnace technology improved allowing molten glass to be produced for the first time. At the same time, the expansion of the empire also brought an influx of people and an expansion of cultural influences that resulted in the adoption of eastern decorative styles. The changes that took place in the Roman glass industry during this period can therefore be seen as a result of three primary influences: historical events, technical innovation and contemporary fashions. They are also linked to the fashions and technologies developed in the ceramic trade, from which a number of forms and techniques were drawn.

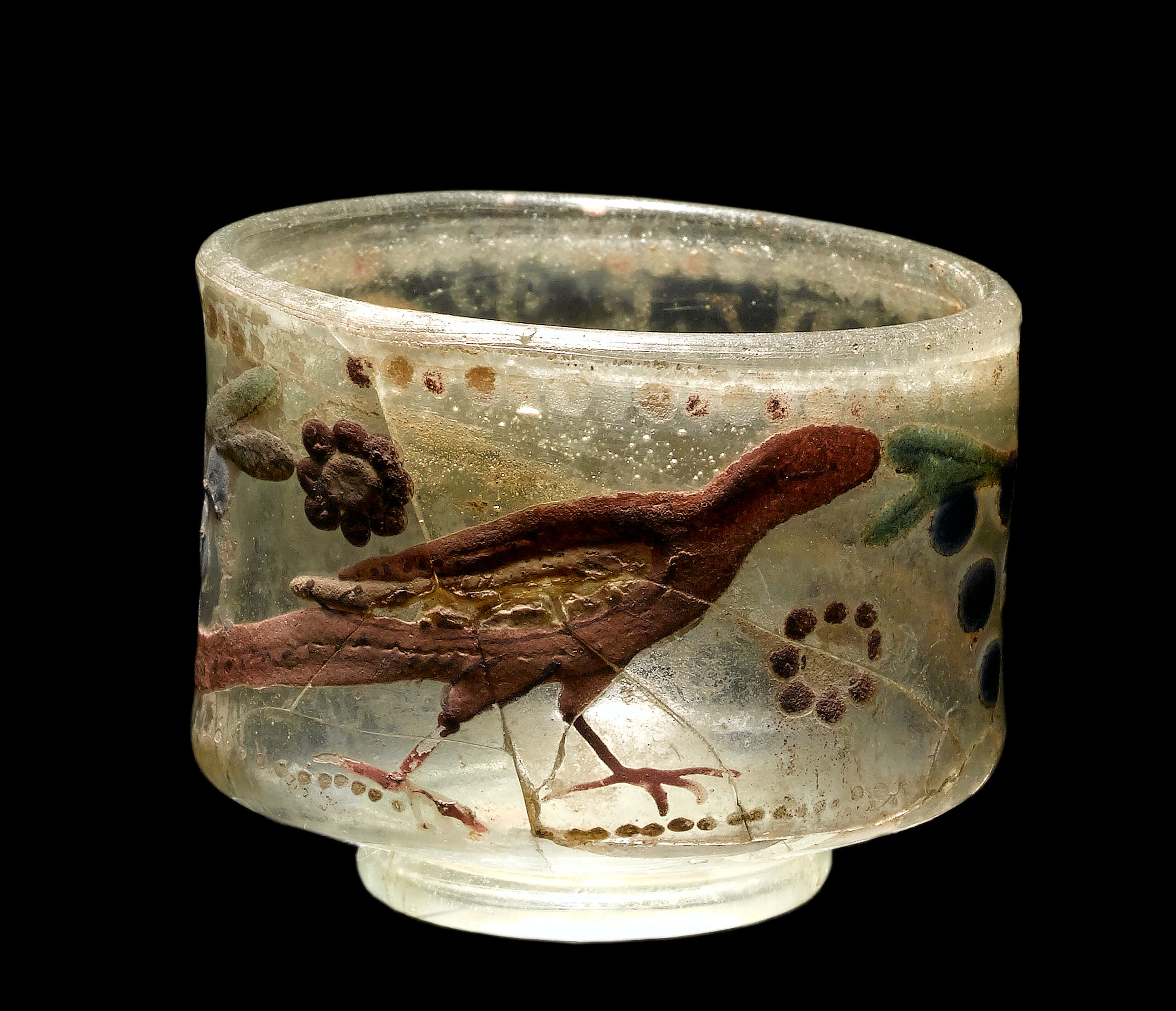
"Circus beaker" from Roman Iron Age, found in Varpelev, Denmark

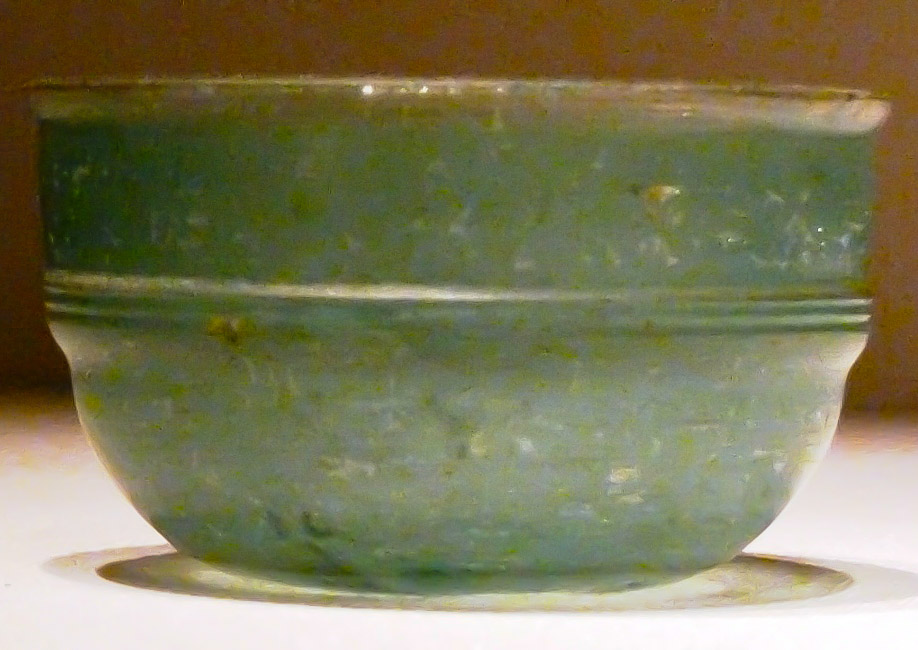
Green Roman glass cup unearthed from an Eastern Han Dynasty (25–220 AD) tomb, Guangxi, China

Glass making reached its peak at the beginning of the 2nd century AD, with glass objects in domestic contexts of every kind. The primary production techniques of blowing, and to a lesser extent casting, remained in use for the rest of the Roman period, with changes in vessel types but little change in technology. From the 2nd century onwards styles became increasingly regionalised, and evidence indicates that bottles and closed vessels such as unguentaria moved as a by-product of the trade in their contents, and many appear to have matched the Roman scale of liquid measurement. The use of coloured glass as a decorative addition to pale and colourless glasses also increased, and metal vessels continued to influence the shape of glass vessels. After the conversion of Constantine, glass works began to move more quickly from depicting Pagan religious imagery towards Christian religious imagery. The movement of the capital to Constantinople rejuvenated the Eastern glass industry, and the presence of the Roman military in the western provinces did much to prevent any downturn there. By the mid-4th century mould-blowing was in use only sporadically.

== Production ==
=== Composition ===
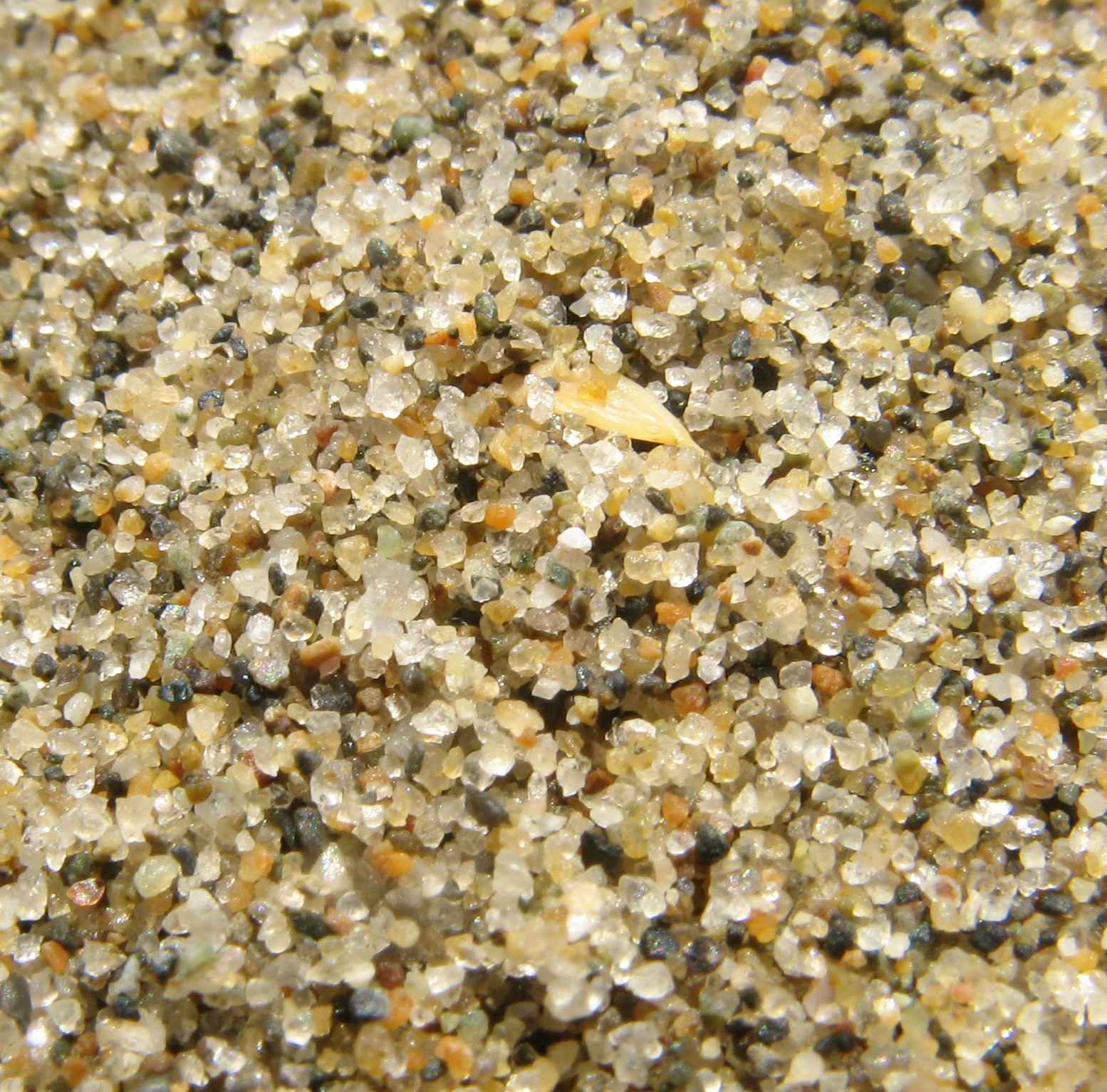
Close-up of beach sand, the main component of Roman glass

Roman glass production relied on the application of heat to fuse two primary ingredients: silica and soda. Technical studies of archaeological glasses divide the ingredients of glass as formers, fluxes, stabilisers, as well as possible opacifiers or colourants.

- Former: The major component of the glass is silica, which during the Roman period was sand (quartz), which contains some alumina (typically 2.5%) and up to 8% lime. Alumina contents vary, peaking around 3% in glasses from the western Empire, and remaining notably lower in glasses from the Middle East.
- Flux: This ingredient was used to lower the melting point of the silica to form glass. Analysis of Roman glass has shown that soda (sodium carbonate) was used exclusively in glass production. During this period, the primary source of soda was natron, a naturally occurring salt found in dry lake beds. The main source of natron during the Roman period was Wadi El Natrun, Egypt, although there may have been a source in Italy.
- Stabiliser: Glasses formed of silica and soda are naturally soluble, and require the addition of a stabiliser such as lime or magnesia. Lime was the primary stabiliser in use during the Roman period, entering the glass through calcareous particles in the beach sand, rather than as a separate component.

Roman glass has also been shown to contain around 1% to 2% chlorine, in contrast to later glasses. This is thought to have originated either in the addition of salt (NaCl) to reduce the melting temperature and viscosity of the glass, or as a contaminant in the natron.

=== Glass making ===
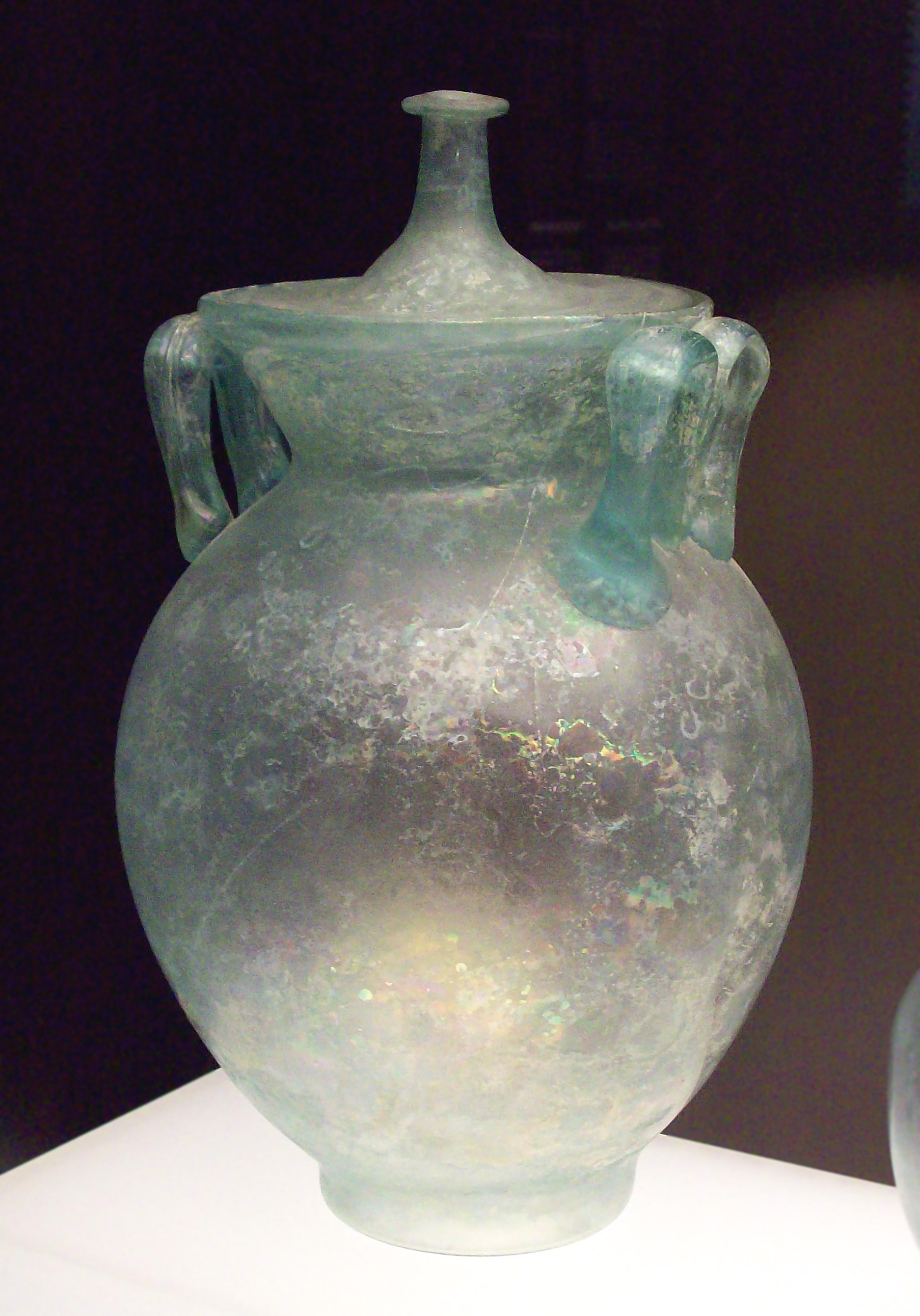
Roman blown-glass cinerary urn, dated between 1st and 3rd centuries AD

In terms of glass making, a distinction should be made between raw glass manufacturing (primary production) and glass processing (secondary production). Archaeological evidence for glass making during the Roman period is scarce, but by drawing comparisons with the later Islamic and Byzantine periods, it is clear that glass making was a significant industry. By the end of the Roman period glass was being produced in large quantities contained in tanks situated inside highly specialised furnaces, as the 8-tonne glass slab recovered from Bet She'arim illustrates. These primary workshops could produce many tonnes of raw glass in a single furnace firing, and although this firing might have taken weeks, a single primary workshop could potentially supply multiple secondary glass working sites. It is therefore thought that raw glass production was centred around a relatively small number of workshops, where glass was produced on a large scale and then broken into chunks.

There is only limited evidence for local glass making, and only in context of window glass. The development of this large-scale industry is not fully understood, but Pliny's Natural History (36, 194), in addition to evidence for the first use of molten glass in the mid-1st century AD, indicates that furnace technologies experienced marked development during the early-to-mid-1st century AD, in tandem with the expansion of glass production.

The siting of primary glass-making workshops was governed by three crucial factors: the availability of fuel which was needed in large quantities, sources of sand which represented the major constituent of the glass, and natron to act as a flux. Roman glass relied on natron from Egypt and Judea, places like Bet Eli'ezer, Alexandria or Wadi El Natrun, and as a result it is thought that glass-making workshops during the Roman period may have been confined to near-coastal regions of the eastern Mediterranean. Ouest Embiez 1, an early 3rd-century shipwreck discovered off the southern coast of France, was carrying (alongside already manufactured glassware) cargo of raw glass blocks of different sizes, totaling around 15 to 18 tonnes, which appears to confirm the export of raw glass from the eastern provinces to some extent. This facilitated the trade in the raw colourless or naturally coloured glass which reached secondary glass-working sites across the Roman empire. But to date, only eight Roman-era shipwrecks containing raw glass have been identified in the Mediterranean Sea. Therefore, out of approximately 470 Roman wrecks dated between the 1st and 4th centuries AD, only about 2% appear to have been involved in the transport of raw glass. This comparatively low proportion suggests that long-distance trade in raw glass was somewhat limited and may indicate the additional existence of primary glass production sites in other parts of the empire. Reasonable assumptions for primary production in western roman provinces could be made for the sites such as London, or at Hambach Forest supplying the glass production workshops of Cologne - although the theories are disputed, and firm proof is still lacking. And as it cannot be ruled out that waste glass could have been remelted on similar sites, it is not always easy to distinguish between workshops of primary raw glass production and waste glass recycling.

The scarcity of archaeological evidence for Roman glass-making facilities has resulted in the use of chemical compositions as evidence for production models, as the division of production indicates that any variation is related to differences in raw glass making. But the Roman reliance on natron from sites like Wadi El Natrun as a flux, combined with a continuous recycling process, has resulted in a largely homogeneous composition in the majority of Roman glasses. Despite the publication of major analyses, comparisons of chemical analyses produced by different analytical methods have only recently been attempted, and although there is some variation in Roman glass compositions, meaningful compositional groups have been difficult to establish for this period.

=== Recycling ===
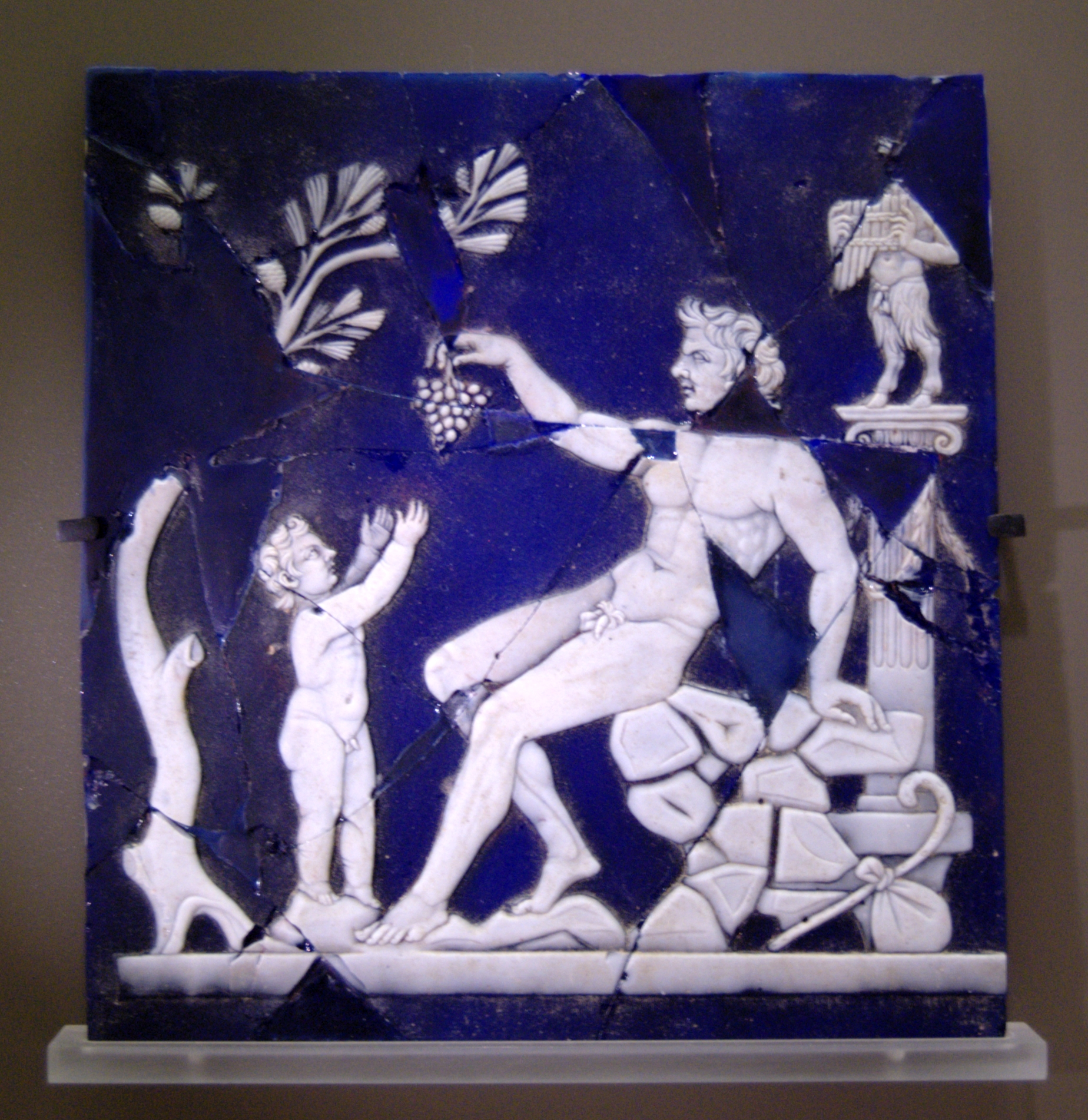
Cameo glass plaque with the infant Bacchus and a satyr, early 1st century AD.

The Roman writers Statius and Martial both indicate that recycling broken glass was an important part of the glass industry, and this seems to be supported by the fact that only rarely are glass fragments of any size recovered from domestic sites of this period. In the western empire there is evidence that recycling of broken glass was frequent and extensive, and that quantities of broken glassware were concentrated at local sites prior to melting back into raw glass. In the eastern empire, there is evidence of recycled Roman glass being used to glaze Parthian pottery. Compositionally, repeated recycling is visible via elevated levels of those metals used as colourants.

Melting does not appear to have taken place in crucibles; rather, cooking pots appear to have been used for small scale operations. For larger work, large tanks or tank-like ceramic containers were utilised. In the largest cases, large furnaces were built to surround these tanks.

=== Glass working ===
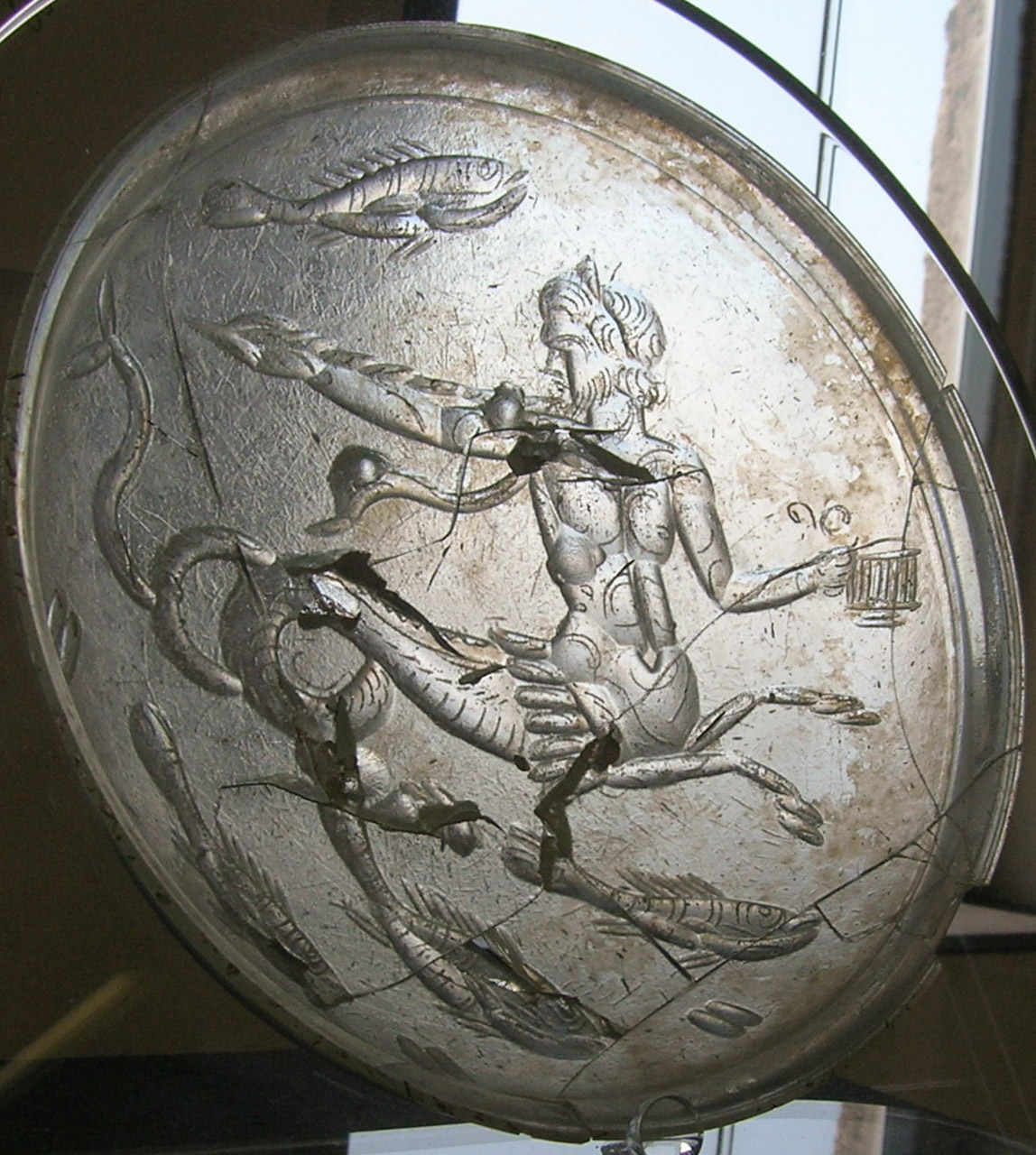
Engraved glass bowl from Colonia Agrippina, 3rd century AD

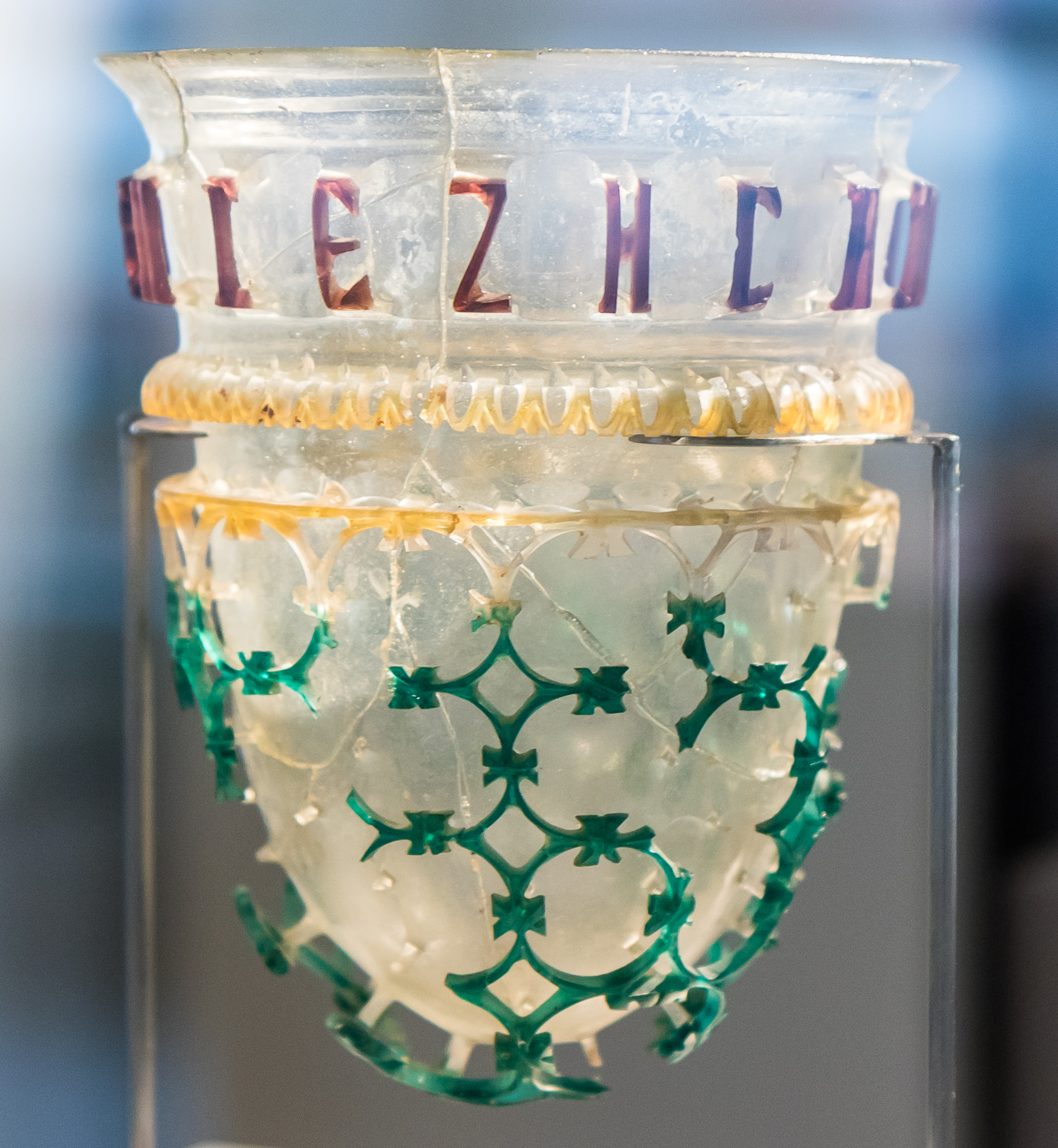
The Cologne cage cup, 12 cm high, 4th century

In comparison to glass making, there is evidence for glass working in many locations across the empire. Unlike the making process, the working of glass required significantly lower temperatures and substantially less fuel. As a result of this and the expansion of the Empire, glass working sites developed in Rome, Campania and the Po Valley by the end of the 1st century BC, producing the new blown vessels alongside cast vessels. Italy is known to have been a centre for the working and export of brightly coloured vessels at this time, with production peaking during the mid-1st century AD.

By the early-to-mid-1st century AD, the growth of the Empire saw the establishment of glass working sites at locations along trade routes, with the Colonia Claudia Ara Agrippinensium (Cologne) and other Rhineland centres becoming important glass working sites from the Imperial period, and Syrian glass being exported as far as Italy. During this period vessel forms varied between workshops, with areas such as the Rhineland and northern France producing distinctive forms which are not seen further south. Growth in the industry continued into the 3rd century AD, when sites at the Colonia Claudia Ara Agrippinensium appear to have experienced significant expansion, and by the 3rd and early 4th centuries producers north of the Alps were exporting down to the north of Italy and the transalpine regions.

The Romano-Germanic Museum in Cologne has the world's largest collection of Roman glass vessels from the 1st to 4th centuries, with more than 4,000 complete collection pieces, including a large number of luxury glasses such as figure vessels, snake thread glasses, cut glasses and tricolor diatretes, for example the famous Cologne cage cup from the 4th century. Typical are glass drinking vessels that are decorated with attached glass drops of a different colour, the so-called Cologne nubs. The collection, which also includes Franconian glass, continues to grow through excavation finds from the Roman necropolises. Glass working sites such as those at Aquileia also had an important role in the spread of glassworking traditions and the trade in materials that used hollow glasswares as containers. However, by the 4th and 5th centuries Italian glass workshops predominate.

=== Styles ===
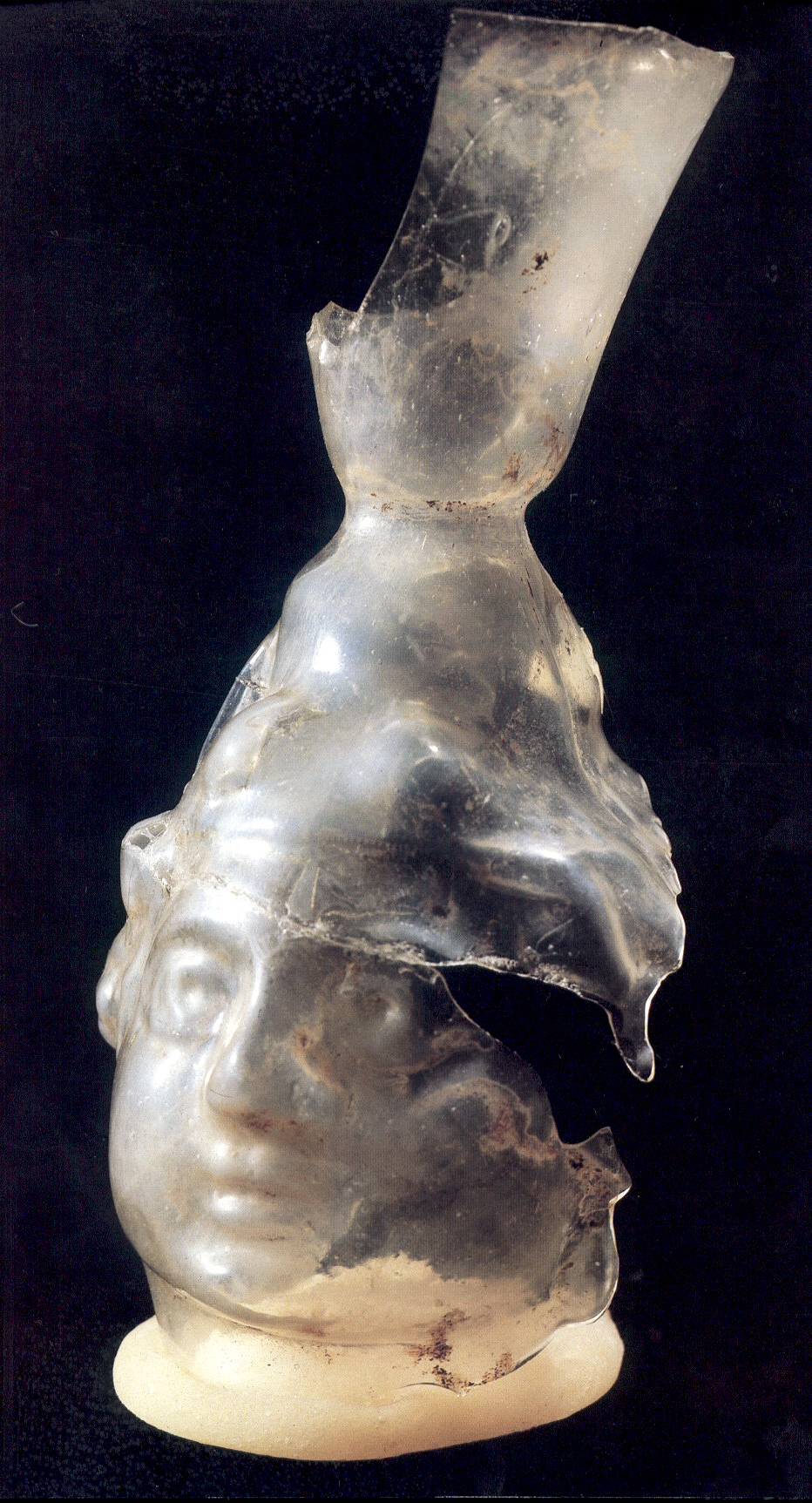
Glass vessel from the 2nd century AD, found in Bosanski Novi

The earliest Roman glass follows Hellenistic traditions and uses strongly coloured and 'mosaic' patterned glass. During the late Republican period new highly coloured striped wares with a fusion of dozens of monochrome and lace-work strips were introduced. During this period there is some evidence that styles of glass varied geographically, with the translucent coloured fine wares of the early 1st century notably 'western' in origin, whilst the later colourless fine wares are more 'international'. These objects also represent the first with a distinctly Roman style unrelated to the Hellenistic casting traditions on which they are based, and are characterised by novel rich colours. 'Emerald' green, dark or cobalt blue, a deep blue-green and Persian or 'peacock' blue are most commonly associated with this period, and other colours are very rare. Of these, Emerald green and peacock blue were new colours introduced by the Romano-Italian industry and almost exclusively associated with the production of fine wares.

However, during the last thirty years of the 1st century AD there was a marked change in style, with strong colours disappearing rapidly, replaced by 'aqua' and true colourless glasses. Colourless and 'aqua' glasses had been in use for vessels and some mosaic designs prior to this, but start to dominate the blown glass market at this time. The use of strong colours in cast glass died out during this period, with colourless or 'aqua' glasses dominating the last class of cast vessels to be produced in quantity, as mould and free-blowing took over during the 1st century AD.

From around 70 AD colourless glass becomes the predominant material for fine wares, and the cheaper glasses move towards pale shades of blue, green, and yellow. Debate continues whether this change in fashion indicates a change in attitude that placed glass as individual material of merit no longer required to imitate precious stones, ceramics, or metal, or whether the shift to colourless glass indicated an attempt to mimic highly prized rock crystal. Pliny's Natural History states that "the most highly valued glass is colourless and transparent, as closely as possible resembling rock crystal" (36, 198), which is thought to support this last position, as is evidence for the persistence of casting as a production technique, which produced the thickly walled vessels necessary to take the pressure of extensive cutting and polishing associated with crystal working.

== Vessel production techniques ==
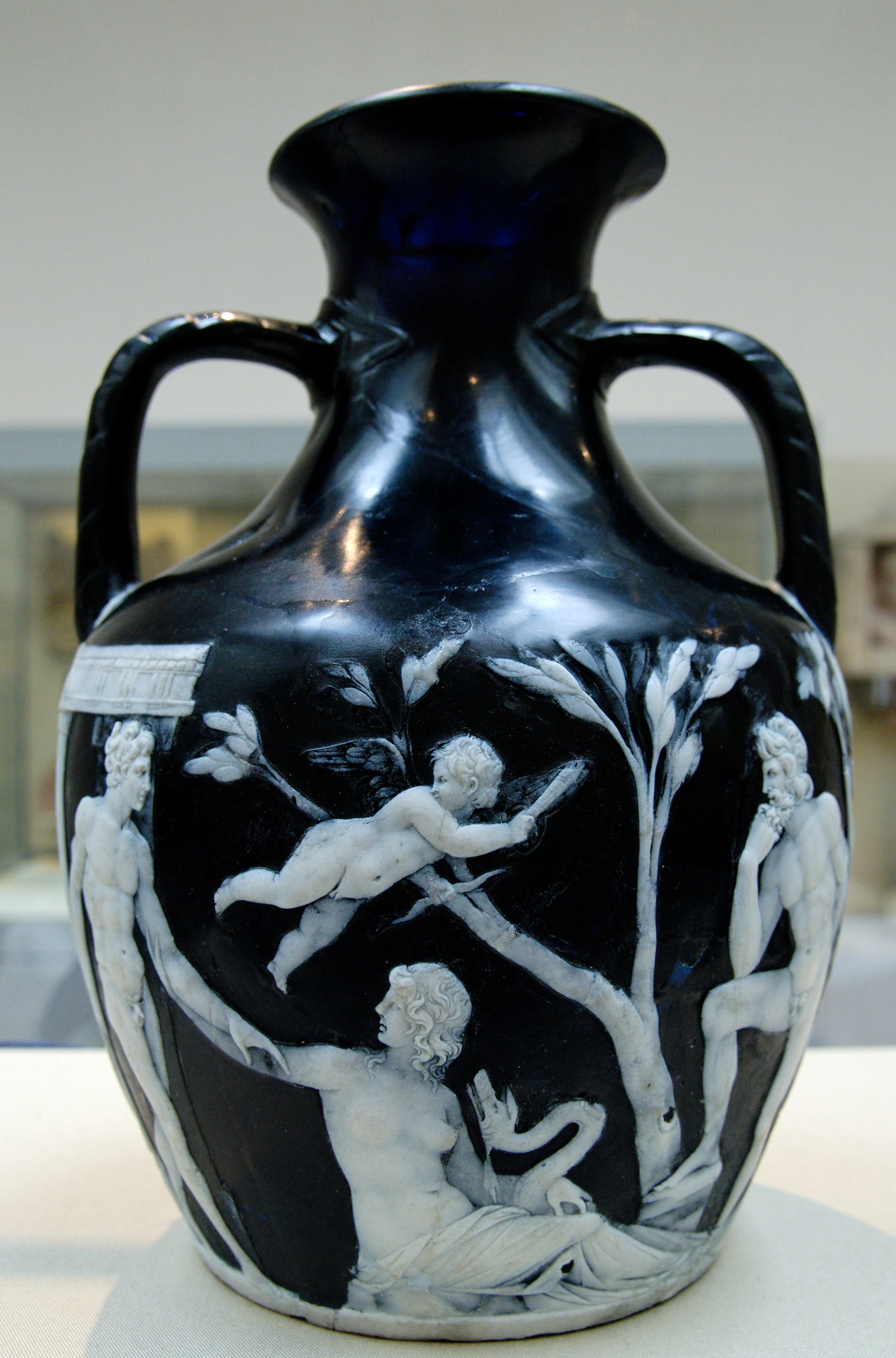
The Portland Vase, 5–25 AD(?) cameo glass.

=== Core and rod formed vessels ===
Artisans used a mass of mud and straw fixed around a metal rod to form a core, and built up a vessel by either dipping the core in liquified glass, or by trailing liquid glass over the core. The core was removed after the glass had cooled, and handles, rims and bases were then added. These vessels are characterised by relatively thick walls, bright colours and zigzagging patterns of contrasting colours, and were limited in size to small unguent or scent containers. This early technique continued in popularity during the 1st century BC, despite the earlier introduction of slumped and cast vessels.

=== Cold-cut vessels ===
This technique is related to the origin of glass as a substitute for gemstones. By borrowing techniques for stone and carved gems, artisans were able to produce a variety of small containers from blocks of raw glass or thick moulded blanks, including cameo glass in two or more colours, and cage cups (still thought by most scholars to have been decorated by cutting, despite some debate).

=== Glass blowing: free and mould blown vessels ===
These techniques, which were to dominate the Roman glass working industry after the late 1st century AD, are discussed in detail on the glass blowing page. Mould-blown glass appears in the second quarter of the 1st century AD.

=== Other production techniques ===
A number of other techniques were in use during the Roman period:

- Cage cup production
- Cameo glass production
- Slumping
- Casting

== Decorative techniques ==
=== Cast glass patterns ===
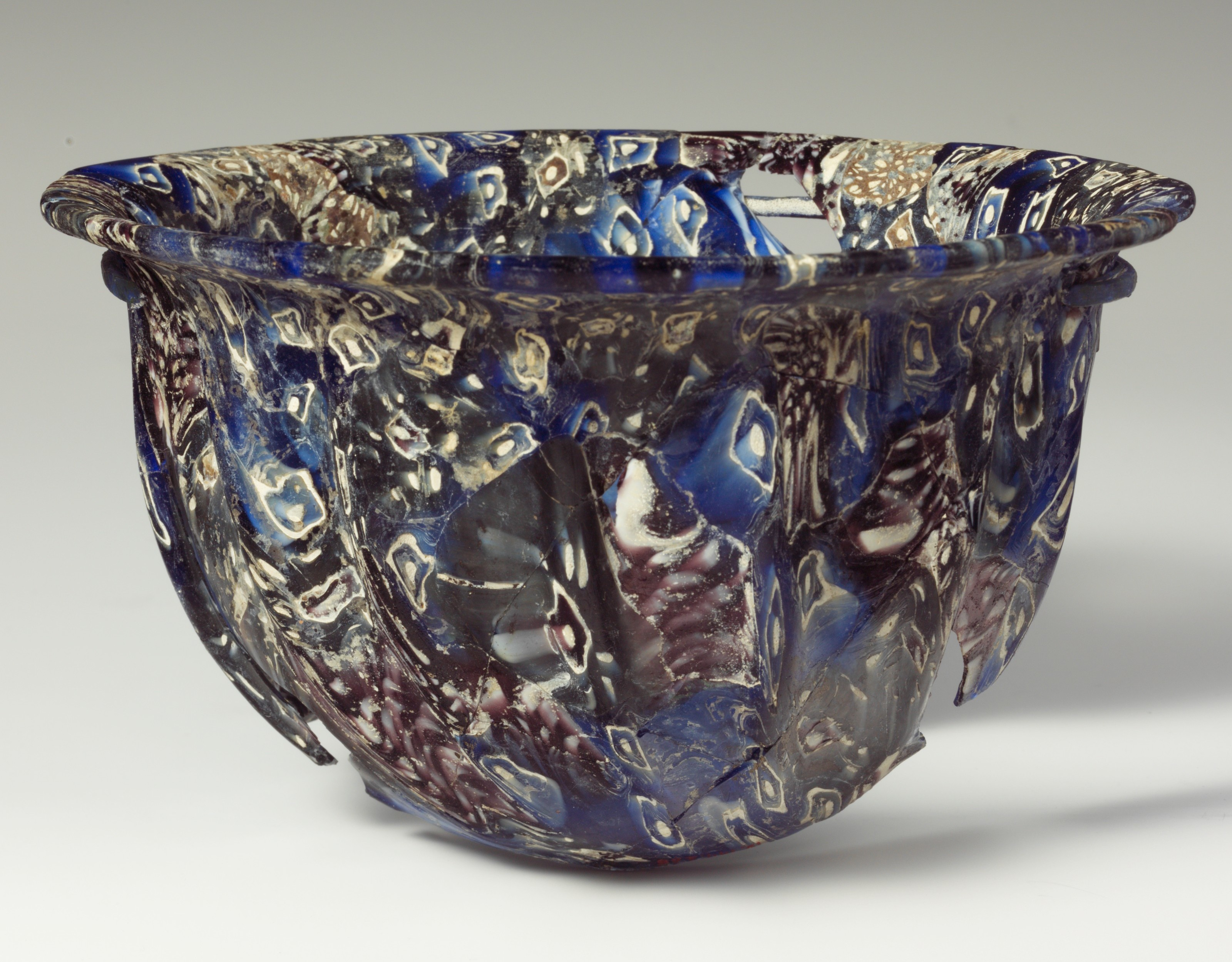
Ribbed bowl of mosaic glass in the Metropolitan Museum of Art

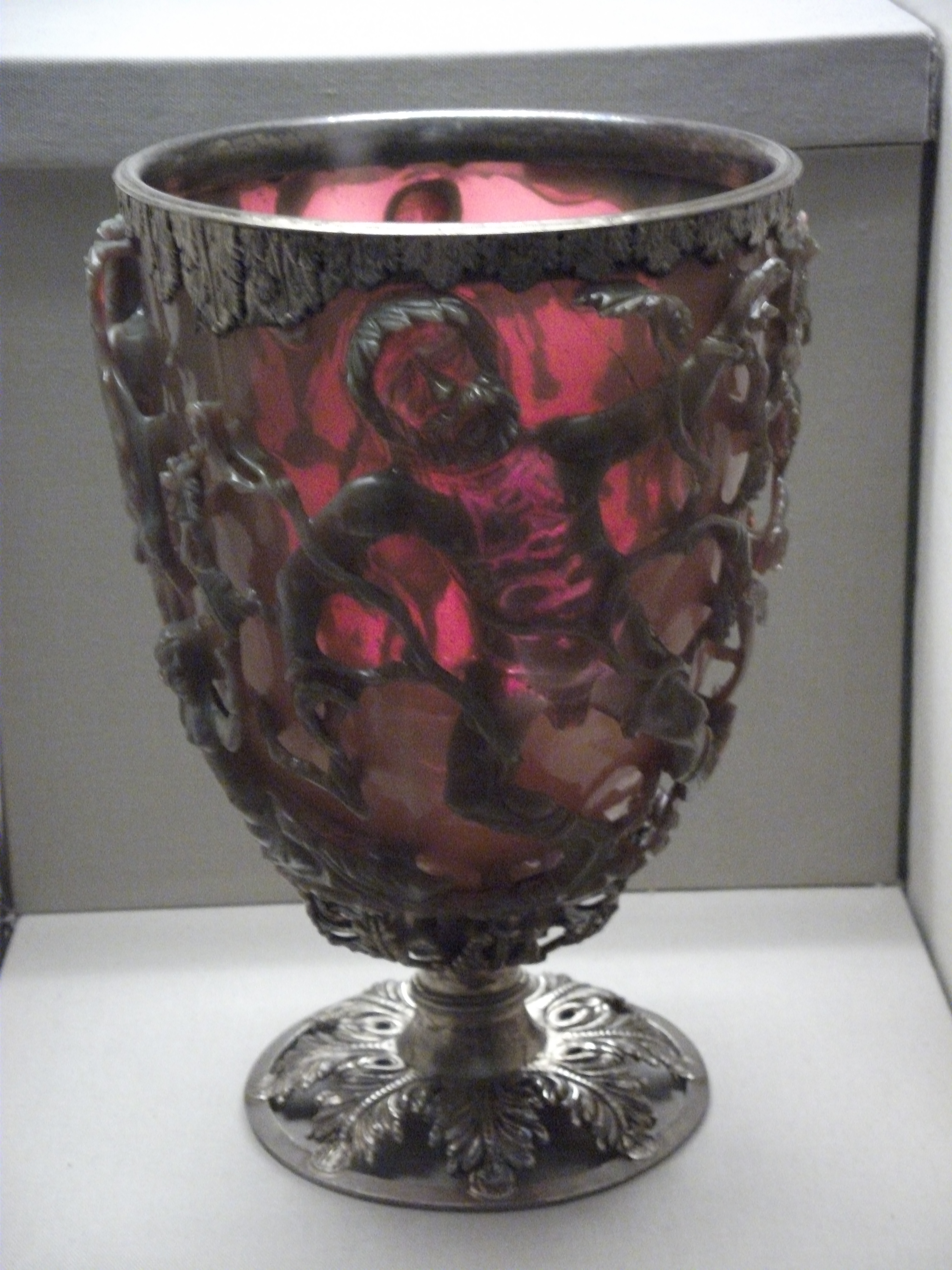
The Lycurgus Cup, a dichroic (colour-changing) cage cup, lit from behind, with a modern foot and rim.

The glass sheets used for slumping could be produced of plain or multicoloured glass, or even formed of 'mosaic' pieces. The production of these objects later developed into the modern caneworking and millefiori techniques, but is noticeably different. Six primary patterns of 'mosaic' glass have been identified:

- Floral (millefiori) and spiral patterns: This was produced by binding rods of coloured glass together and heating and fusing them into a single piece. These were then cut in cross-section, and the resulting discs could be fused together to create complex patterns. Alternately, two strips of contrasting-coloured glass could be fused together, and then wound round a glass rod whilst still hot to produce a spiral pattern. Cross-sections of this were also cut, and could be fused together to form a plate or fused to plain glass.
- Marbled and dappled patterns: Some of these patterns are clearly formed through the distortion of the original pattern during the slumping of the glass plate during melting. However, by using spiral and circular patterns of alternating colours producers were also able to deliberately imitate the appearance of natural stones such as sardonyx. This occurs most often on pillar-moulded bowls, which are one of the commonest glass finds on 1st century sites.
- Lace patterns: Strips of coloured glass were twisted with a contrasting coloured thread of glass before being fused together. This was a popular method in the early period, but appears to have gone out of fashion by the mid-1st century AD.
- Striped patterns: Lengths of monochrome and lacework glass were fused together to create vivid striped designs, a technique that developed from the lace pattern technique during the last decades of the 1st century AD.

The production of multicoloured vessels declined after the mid-1st century, but remained in use for some time after.

=== Gold glass ===
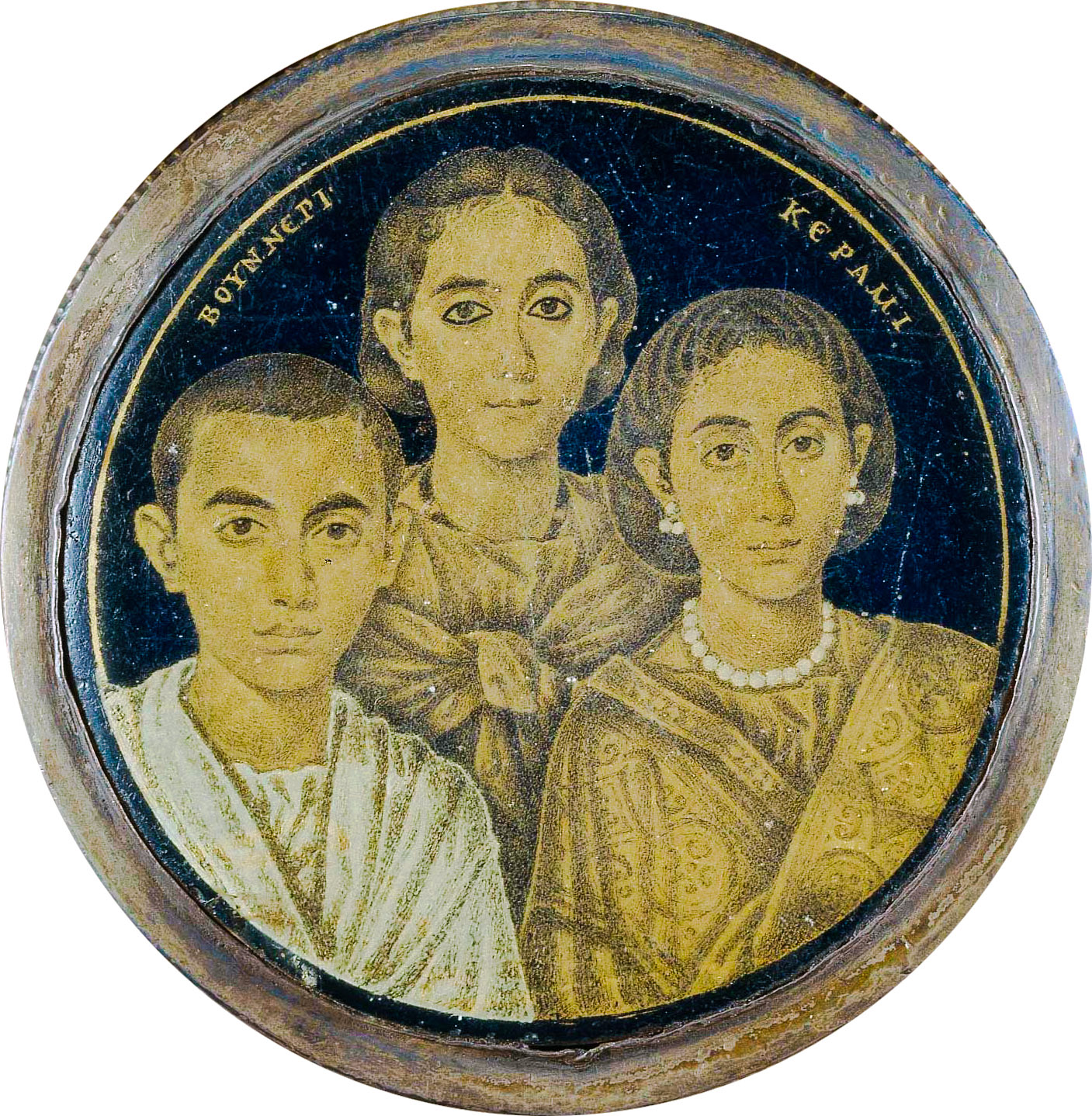
Detail of a gold glass medallion with a portrait of a family, from Alexandria (Roman Egypt), 3rd–4th century (Brescia, Museo di Santa Giulia)

Gold sandwich glass or gold glass was a technique for fixing a layer of gold leaf with a design between two fused layers of glass, developed in Hellenistic glass and revived in the 3rd century. There are a very fewer larger designs, but the great majority of the around 500 survivals are roundels that are the cut-off bottoms of wine cups or glasses used to mark and decorate graves in the Catacombs of Rome by pressing them into the mortar. The great majority are 4th century, extending into the 5th century. Most are Christian, but many pagan and a few Jewish; their iconography has been much studied, although artistically they are relatively unsophisticated. In contrast, a much smaller group of 3rd century portrait levels are superbly executed, with pigment painted on top of the gold. The same technique began to be used for gold tesserae for mosaics in the mid-1st century in Rome, and by the 5th century these had become the standard background for religious mosaics.

=== Other decorative techniques ===
A number of other techniques were in use during the Roman period, including enamelled glass and engraved glass.

== Tesserae and window glass ==
Shards of broken glass or glass rods were being used in mosaics from the Augustan period onwards, but by the beginning of the 1st century small glass tiles, known as tesserae, were being produced specifically for use in mosaics. These were usually in shades of yellow, blue or green, and were predominantly used in mosaics laid under fountains or as highlights.

Around the same time the first window panes are thought to have been produced. The earliest panes were rough cast into a wooden frame on top of a layer of sand or stone, but from the late 3rd century onwards window glass was made by the muff process, where a blown cylinder was cut laterally and flattened out to produce a sheet.

== Chemistry and colours ==
See also modern glass colors.

	Colourant	Content	Comments	Furnace conditions
'Aqua'	Iron(II) oxide (FeO)		'Aqua', a pale blue-green colour, is the common natural colour of untreated glass. Many early Roman vessels are this colour.	
Colourless	Iron(III) oxide (Fe_{2}O_{3})		Colourless glass was produced in the Roman period by adding either antimony or manganese oxide. This oxidised the iron (II) oxide to iron (III) oxide, which although yellow, is a much weaker colourant, allowing the glass to appear colourless. The use of manganese as a decolourant was a Roman invention first noted in the Imperial period; prior to this, antimony-rich minerals were used. However, antimony acts as a stronger decolourant than manganese, producing a more truly colourless glass; in Italy and northern Europe antimony or a mixture of antimony and manganese continued to be used well into the 3rd century. This end has been linked to the end of Roman occupation of Dacia and its stibnite.	
Amber	Iron–sulfur compounds	0.2%-1.4% S 0.3% Fe	Sulfur is likely to have entered the glass as a contaminant of natron, producing a green tinge. Formation of iron-sulfur compounds produces an amber colour.	Reducing
Purple	Manganese (such as pyrolusite)	Around 3%		Oxidising
Blue and green	Copper	2%–13%	The natural 'aqua' shade can be intensified with the addition of copper. During the Roman period this was derived from the recovery of oxide scale from scrap copper when heated, to avoid the contaminants present in copper minerals. Copper produced a translucent blue moving towards a darker and denser green.	Oxidising
Dark green	Lead		By adding lead, the green colour produced by copper could be darkened.	
Royal blue to navy	Cobalt	0.1%	Intense colouration	
Powder blue	Egyptian blue			
Opaque red to brown (Pliny's haematinum)	Copper, lead	>10% Cu; 1% – 20% Pb	Under strongly reducing conditions, copper present in the glass will precipitate inside the matrix as cuprous oxide, making the glass appear brown to blood red. Lead encourages precipitation and brilliance. The red is a rare find, but is known to have been in production during the 4th, 5th and later centuries on the continent.	Strongly reducing
White	Antimony (such as stibnite)	1–10%	Antimony reacts with the lime in the glass matrix to precipitate calcium antimonite crystals creating a white with high opacity.	Oxidising
Yellow	Antimony and lead (such as bindheimite).		Precipitation of lead pyroantimonate creates an opaque yellow. Yellow rarely appears alone in Roman glass, but was used for the mosaic and polychrome pieces.	

These colours formed the basis of all Roman glass, and although some of them required high technical ability and knowledge, a degree of uniformity was achieved.

== Physics and colours ==
Not all the colours of ancient glass are necessarily produced by chemical dopants, or impurities, initially present in the amorphous glass network, or incorporated in a later stade in the altered glass (buried in the soil or exposed to ambient air) by a slow diffusion-controlled process. Beside metallic cations, well known for their characteristic colours, or less frequently anions such as the red-brown selenide anion (HSe^{−}, Se^{2−}), or the trisulfide cyclic species S^{−}_{3} responsible for the typical blue colour of lazurite and lapis lazuli, other processes of pure physical nature can also affect the glass colour.

Glass alteration can also induce the formation of rhythmic bands of crystallised SiO_{2} (neoformed nanolayers of silica) at the surface of the weathered glass. These bands resemble Liesegang rings produced by a slow rhythmic recrystallisation process of the glass, likely occurring in the silicagel layer formed by the hydration of the outer glass surface. The diffraction of light by the so-formed grating constituted by hundred of nanolayers of silica crystallised at the surface of the altered glass is responsible for a typical golden patina.

== See also ==
- Ancient glass trade
- Diffraction grating
- Photonic crystal
- Speyer wine bottle
