= Guduvaiyar River =

River in India

The Guduvaiyar River (sometimes pronounced Kuduvaiyar: French: Rivière Guduvaiyar) flows through the Cuddalore and Villupuram districts of Tamil Nadu and Puducherry Union Territory. The river is mainly used for irrigation by the anicuts at Kizhur.

It is a stream originates near Valavanur. It generally gets flooded during the monsoon season. Few bed dams exists in its course, one at Kizhur is the major one. This river joins Sankaraparani River near Chunnabar Bridge (NH-45A) at Ariyankuppam. It form border between Tamil Nadu and various enclaves of Puducherry.

== See also ==
- List of rivers in Puducherry
