= Arikamedu =

Archaeological site in South India

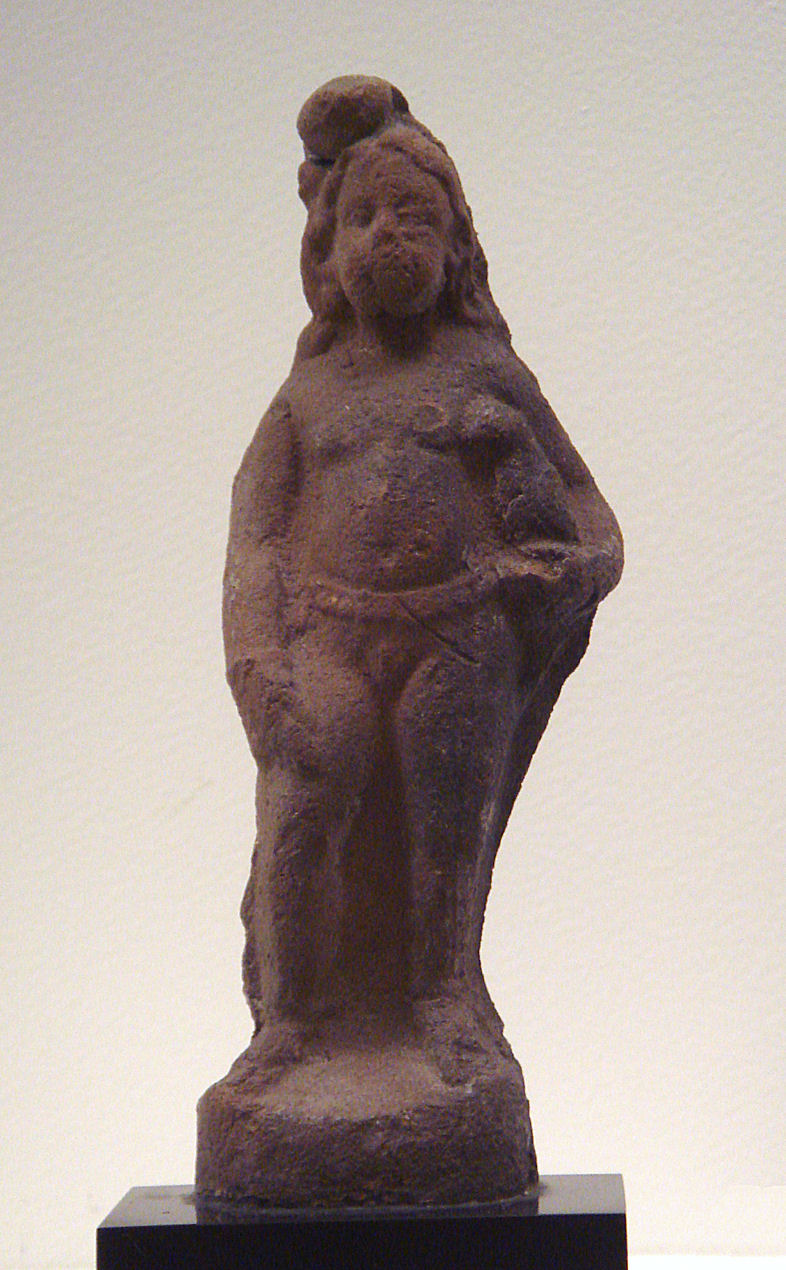
- A statue of a girl with a bird, 2nd Century CE, found at Arikamedu

- Location within Puducherry Location within India
- 11°54′3″N 79°49′13″E
- Location: Pondicherry, India
- Region: South India

Arikamedu is an archaeological site in Southern India, in Kakkayanthope, Ariyankuppam Commune, Puducherry. It is 4 kilometres (2.5 mi) from the capital, Pondicherry of the Indian territory of Puducherry.

Sir Mortimer Wheeler 1945, and Jean-Marie Casal conducted archaeological excavations there in 1947–1950. The site was identified as the port of Podouke, known as an "emporium" in the Periplus of the Erythraean Sea and Ptolemy. Digs have found Amphorae, Arretine ware, Roman lamps, glassware, glass and stone beads, and gems at the site. Based on these excavations, Wheeler concluded that the Arikamedu was a Greek (Yavana) trading post that traded with Rome, starting during the reign of Augustus Caesar, and lasted about two hundred years—from the late first century BCE to the first and second centuries CE. Subsequent investigation by Vimala Begley from 1989 to 1992 modified this assessment, and now place the period of settlement from the 2nd century BCE to the 8th century CE.

Significant findings at Arikamedu include numerous Indo-Pacific beads, which facilitated fixing the period of its origin. Red and black ceramics—known as megalithic stones or Pandukal in Tamil meaning "old stones" and used to mark graves—have existed at the site even prior to dates of the trading post, and also in later periods.

== Location ==
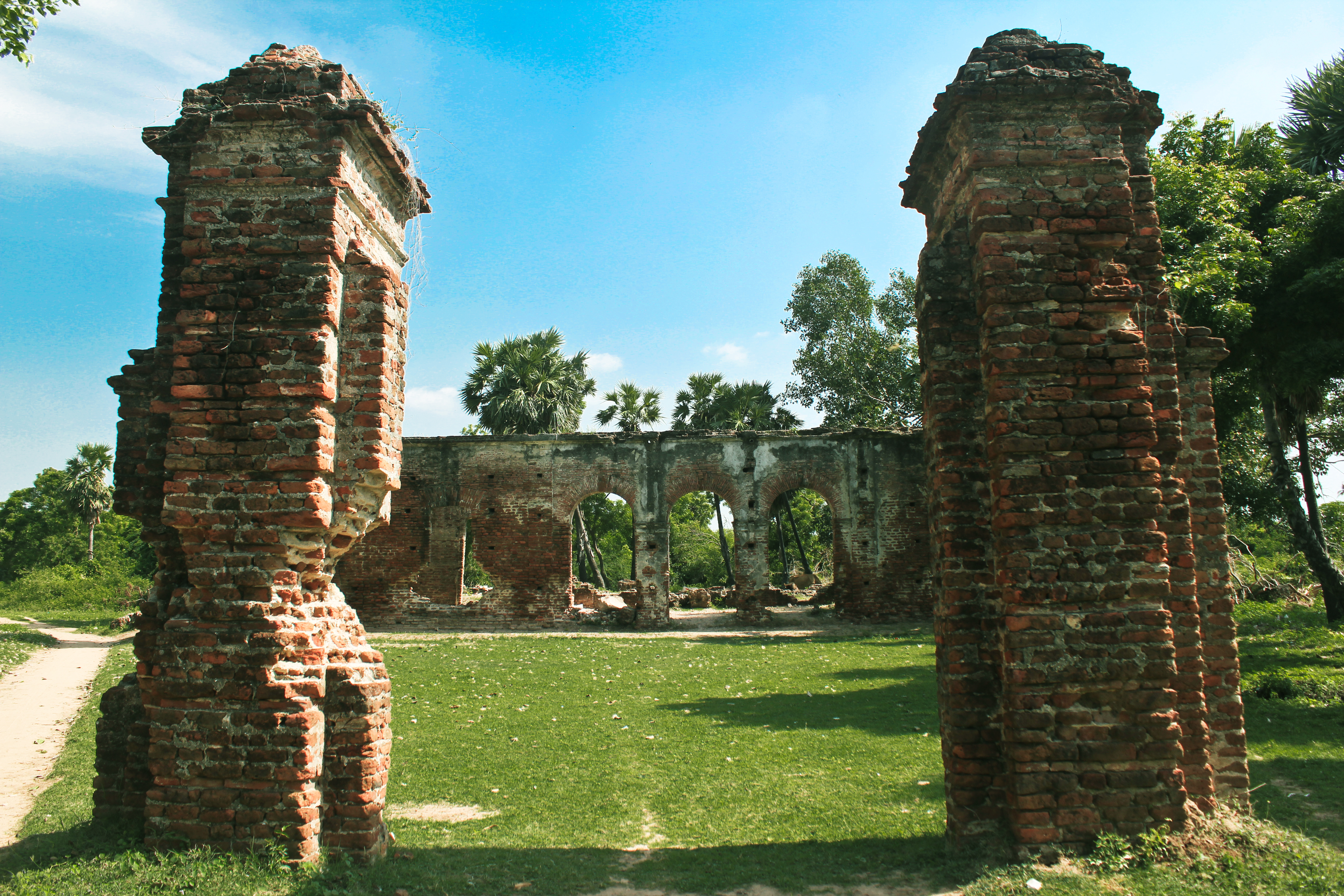
Entrance to the Arikamedu site

Arikamedu is a coastal fishing village, under the Ariankuppam Panchayat, on the southeastern coast of India, 4 kilometres (2.5 mi) from Pondicherry, on the Pondicherry-Cuddalore road; it was originally a French colonial town. It is located on the bank of the Ariyankuppam River (for most part of the year the river is considered a lagoon), also known as Virampattinam River, which forms the northern outlet of the Gingee River as it joins the Bay of Bengal. As the site is located at the bend of the river it provides protection to sea-going vessels that dock there. The site has been subject to extensive archaeological excavations. The archaeological site is spread over an area of 34.57 acres (13.99 ha) and has been under the control of the Archaeological Survey of India since 1982.

== Etymology ==
The name Arikamedu, an archaeological usage for the excavated site, originates from a Tamil word that means Mound of Arakan, based on the figurine of an avatar (incarnation) of the Jain Tirthankara Mahavira found at the site. It is also linked with Viraiyapattinam or Virampattinam, meaning Port of Virai, a village next to Arikamedu. Virai, according to Sangam literature, was well known as a port and also for its salt pans during the Velir dynasty. Arikamedu-Virampatnam together find mention as Poduke, a major port in the Periplus of the Erythraean Sea in the first century CE and as Poduke emporion in Ptolemy's Geographia of mid first century CE. Poduke is a Roman name and is also said to be a corrupted version of the Tamil name Potikai, meaning a "meeting place", also known for the local Poduvar clan.

== History ==
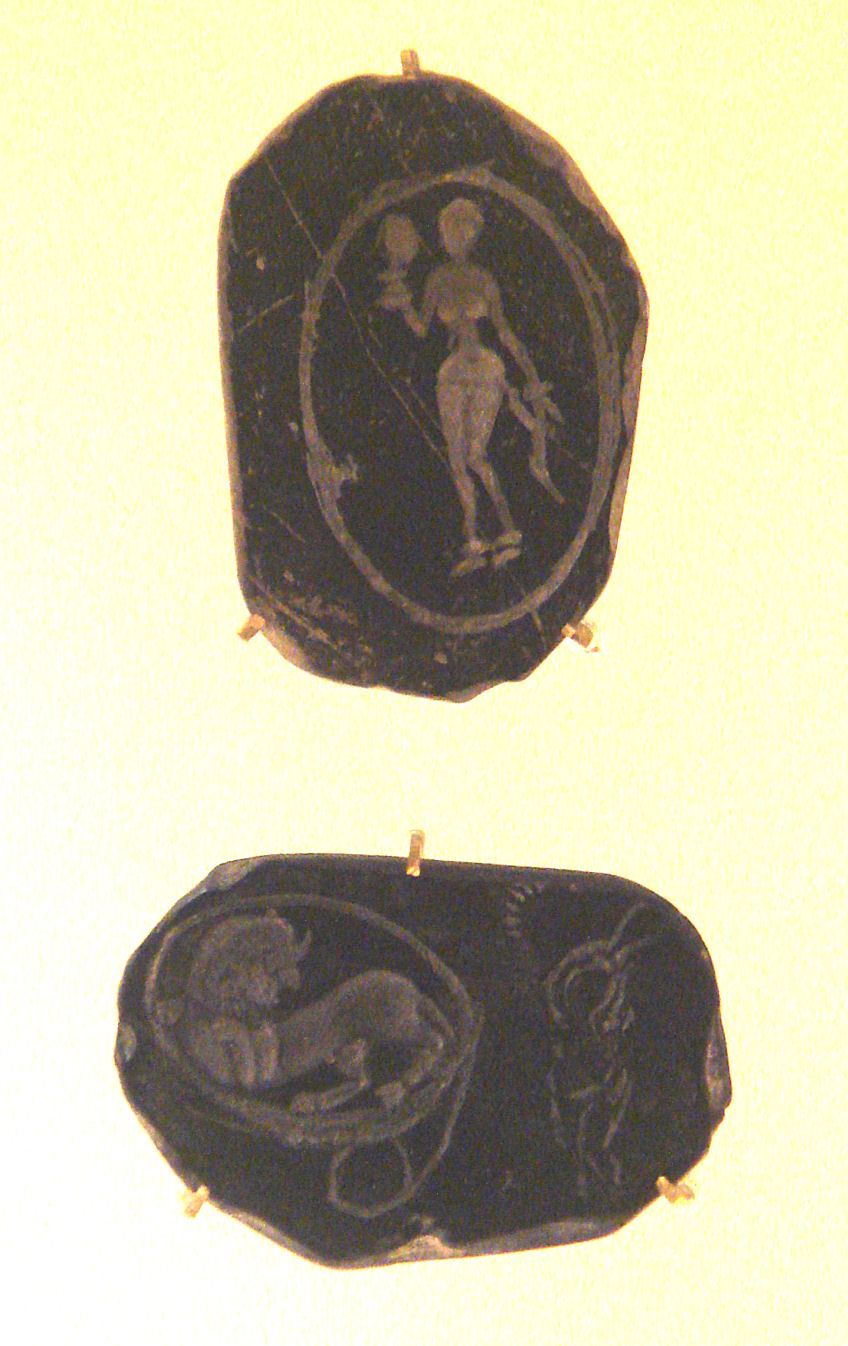
Grey pottery with engravings found at the Arikamedu site

The first mention about Arikamedu was in 1734, in a communication from the Consul of the Indo-French colony of Pondicherry. It informed the French East India Company that villagers were extracting old bricks from the Virampattinam. The earliest mention of the Arikamedu archaeological site was by Le Gentil of France, who the King of France had assigned to observe notable astronomical occurrences in the world. Gentil, after visiting Arikamedu, confirmed the earlier report of the Consul of the Indo-French colony.

In 1765, when he visited the ruins at the site, he found the people of the village collecting large ancient bricks exposed at the river bank. The villagers told him that they had retrieved the bricks from an old fort of the king the Vira-Raguen. In 1937, Jouveau Dubreuil, an Indologist, also from France, purchased gem stone antiquities from local children, and also gathered some exposed on the site's surface. In particular, he found an intaglio carved with the picture of a man. As a numismatist, he identified the intaglio as Augustus Caesar. He also found fine beads and gems. He concluded that these antiquities belonged to the Roman Empire. Dubreuil informed the local Governor of Pondicherry about his find, and called Arikamedu "a true Roman city." He published a short note about his findings.

In the early 1940s, Service des Travaux Publics carried out random excavations. Father Fancheux and Raymand Surleau, who were not qualified archaeologists, carried out the excavations at Arikamedu and sent a few antiquities to Indian museums, and also to the École française d'Extrême-Orient in Hanoi.

Sir R.E.M. Wheeler, the Director General of the Archaeological Survey of India, in the 1940s saw a few potsherds of Arikamedu site displayed in the Madras Museum, which he identified as "terra sigillata", or Arretine ware, an expensive ceramic made until 50 CE in Arezzo, Italy. Thereafter, when he visited the Pondicherry Museum and saw more of the findings from the Arikamedu site, he was impressed and thought that he had found the links between the Classical Mediterranean and Ancient India. Soon thereafter in 1945, the penultimate year of World War II, he mounted excavations in a scientific manner. He was looking for an archaeological site in India that could establish its cultural link, a datum of the Indian antiquities to the Greco-Roman period, and this quest led him to the Arikamedu site. These excavations also involved Indian archaeologists, who were trained on the site.

Wheeler published his findings in 1946. He noted that, for the local fishermen of the village, the antiquities were strange—as they consisted of lamps, glass items, gemstones, cutlery and crockery, wine containers, etc. He also observed that traders traveled from west coast and from Ceylon, Kolchoi (Colchi) and the Ganges area to trade goods such as gems, pearls and spices, and silk. He carried out excavations carefully, so that none of the antiquities were damaged. This was followed by investigations after the war, from 1947 to 1950 by Jean-Marie Casal. His report of excavations was not as fully published as Wheeler's. His report was not well known in India, as it was not written in English. However, his important conclusion was that the site belonged to an early megalithic period, as he had located megalithic burials marked by stones, locally known in Tamil as Pandukal close to the site.

The excavations led to antiquities of Roman origin such as beads and gems, amphorae (wine making vats) with remnants of wine, a Roman stamp, big bricks recovered from an old wall, Arretine ware and so forth. From these antiquities Wheeler concluded that the site was related to a period of trading with Rome, and that it was first established by emperor Augustus. He also noted that this Indo-Roman trade lasted for a period of about 200 years, till 200 CE. Wheeler also found the Chinese celadon, identified to belong to the Song-Yuan dynasty, and Chola coins from about the eleventh century, but these were rejected as despoiling items or remnants left by brick-robbers. Items Chinese blue-and-white ware were also recovered from the site.

Wheeler noted that "rouletted Ware" found at the site (designated as "Arikamedu Type 1" in the scientific study under the "Arikamedu Type 10 Project: Mapping Early Historic Networks in South Asia and Beyond") was not of an Indian origin, but was from the Mediterranean region. A ceramic sherd, ("Arikamedu Type 10) has also been investigated for its style and spatial distribution.

After a gap of several decades, in the early 1980s, Vimala Begley studied the ceramics find of the site and proposed a preliminary version of the chronology of the occupation of the site. At the same time she started researching on the beads, organized a proper sequential display of the artifacts of the site at the Pondicherry Museum, and brought out an information brochure.

Begley obtained approvals to carry out excavations at the site in collaboration with the University of Pennsylvania and the University of Madras; she and K.V. Raman were the directors of operation from 1989 to 1992. Steven Sidebothom of the University of Delaware, who had background knowledge of Roman Egypt, was in charge of the trenching at the site. Further excavations were done during six working seasons from 1989 to 1992, which led to a contradictory view that the brick structures and the wells investigated by Wheeler were of poor quality as they were founded on poor sandy foundations. The wood work was also noted to be of poor quality and the houses had no waterproofing. The excavations also lead to a view that Arikamedu's Roman trading link was more of an inference. The excavations have now established that the trading with Rome extended to a period beyond that assessed by Wheeler; that trading continued from the second century BCE to the seventh or eighth century CE.

The extensive findings of glass and stone beads at the site provided Begley the link to Arikamedu's history. She identified the beads as Indo-Pacific beads crafted at Arikamedu. Based on the antiquities and structural features from the excavations, Begley and Raman established a revised sequence of six major periods of occupation of the site. Finds of new variety of Roman Amphorae ware also facilitated revision of the dates of occupancy. They have also inferred that the site has been in continuous occupation since at least 2nd or 3rd century BCE to much more recent times.

== Excavations ==
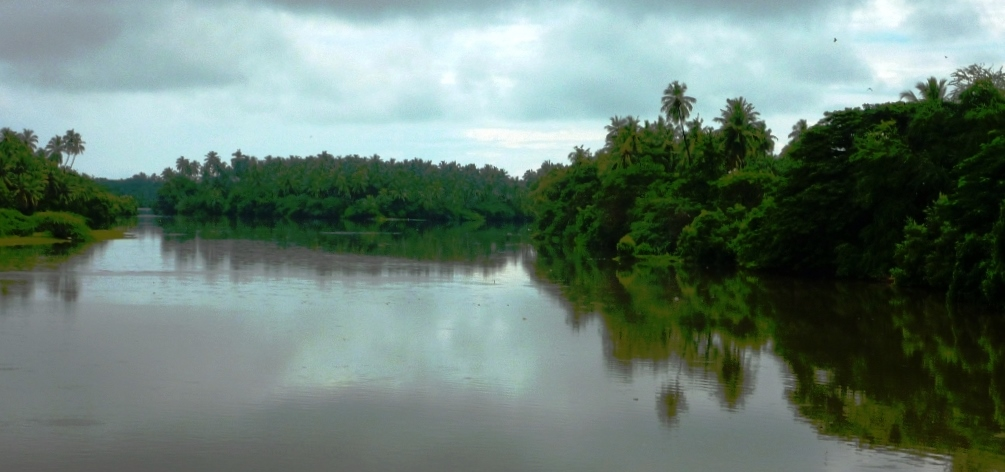
Site of the ancient harbour

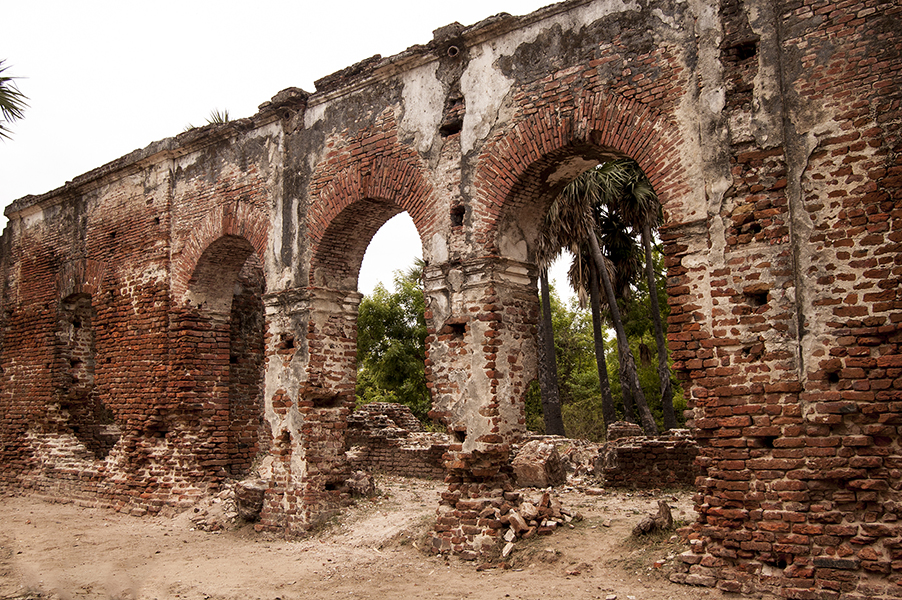
Old brick built building structure

The excavated area of the mound was demarcated into two zones on the basis of occupation and elevation. Northern sector of the mound is nearer to the sea coast while the southern sector is farther away from the coast. The ceramic find of crockery and cooking vessels found in the northern sector were indicative of mass feeding of sailors and traders who camped there. Wine stored in amphorae was the principal item imported from the western countries during the later part of the 2nd century BCE.

According to Wheeler the finds from the northern and southern part of the mound belong to the period from the later part of the 1st century BCE to the 1st and 2nd centuries CE. Identified structures include:

- A brick and lime mortar plaster structure of oblong shape 45 metres (148 ft) in length, with a divide wall, used as a storehouse in the southern part
- Two walled enclosures with ponds and drainage systems in the northern part of the mound that could indicate of dyeing operations that used vats to dye muslin for export
- Pottery, both local and Mediterranean, such as amphorae and Arretine ware that belonged to the Terra Sigillata (stamped pottery) of the 1st century BCE, which went out of use by 50 CE
- Pink amphorae jars used to store wine or oil with two handles and a yellow slip, found in all layers of excavations

Smaller objects include a wheel-turned blackware ceramic, a few terracotta figurines, shell beads, gems, gold, terracotta, iron nails, copper percussion beater, red fragment of a Roman lamp shade, an engraved emblem of emperor Augustus, an ivory handle, and a wooden toy boat. Based on these antiquities Wheeler concluded that the Arikamedu was a Greek (Yavana) trading station. However, recent excavations by Begley have altered this assessment.

The buildings in the northern part of the mound indicative urbanization, with people of different ethnic groups—Indian and non-Indian—but it has not been possible to date them in view of the limited depth of excavations.

== Religious idols ==
The excavation site also found few idols denoting ancient Tamils as the followers of Hinduism. H D Sankalia States that even though religious idols were rare in south India and Arimekadu was one of the rare sites where they excavated a statue of Brahma which was not found even in the northern part of India. Several other idols of Hindu gods were found in the site. H D Sankalia also states that the representation of Brahma was seated in a lotus similar to the brahma emerging from Vishnu's Navel. He further states that the Brahma Statue had a hole in the centre of the lotus so that the figure could be fixed on the peg of the stalk coming out from Vishnu's navel.

== Conservation ==
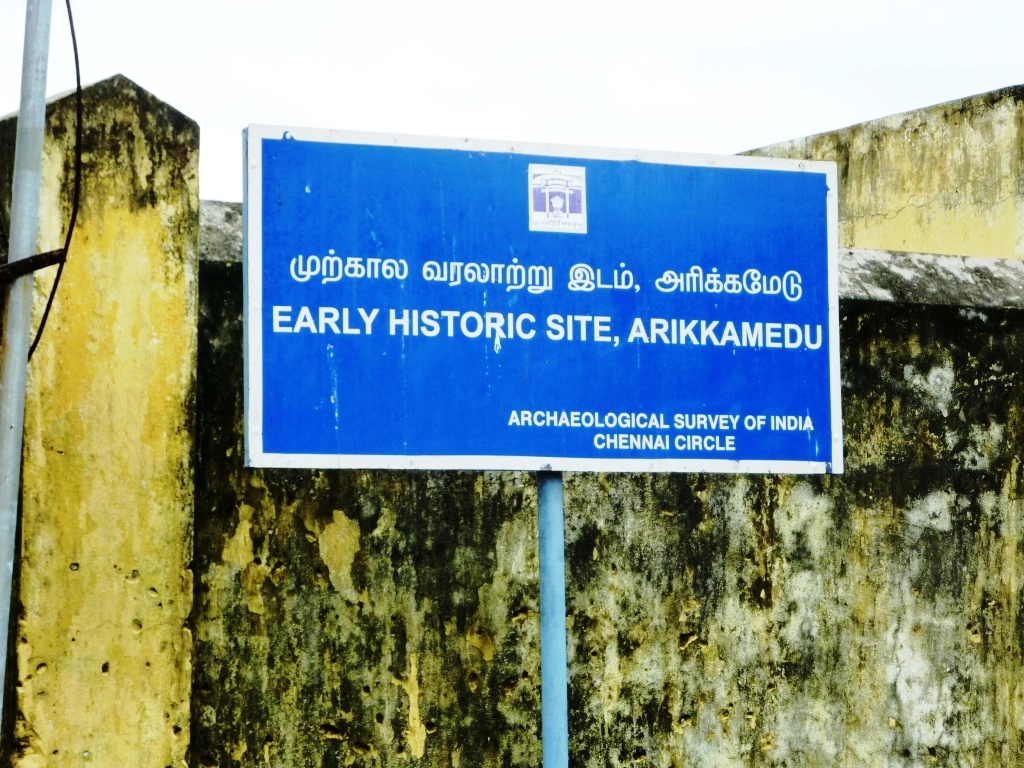
Arikamedu - Archaeological site sign. 2010

An international conference that the Government of Pondicherry and the Italian Ministry of Foreign Affairs held in October 2004 decided to investigate the Arikamedu site jointly for conservation, as its ancient commercial link with the Romans has been established. During this conference, the Government of Pondicherry also decided to propose the site for status as a World Heritage Site of UNESCO. The Archaeological Survey of India also proposed the site for UNESCO Cultural Heritage Site status, under the title Silk Road Sites in India.

== See also ==
- Roman trade with India

== Bibliography ==
- Francis, Peter (1 January 2002). Asia's Maritime Bead Trade: 300 B.C. to the Present. University of Hawaii Press. ISBN 978-0-8248-2332-0.
- Ray, Himanshu Prabha (14 August 2003). The Archaeology of Seafaring in Ancient South Asia. Cambridge University Press. ISBN 978-0-521-01109-9.
- Singh, Upinder (2008). A History of Ancient and Early Medieval India: From the Stone Age to the 12th Century. Pearson Education India. ISBN 978-81-317-1120-0.
