= Sankaraparani River =

River in India

Coordinates: 11.877203°N 79.823127°E

The Sankaraparani River (French: Fleuve Sankaraparani) is a river in Tamil Nadu state of southern India. It originates on the western slope of the Gingee Hills in Viluppuram District, and flows southeastwards to empty into the Bay of Bengal south of Pondicherry. The Sankaraparani is also known as Varahanadi or Gingee River.

== River course ==
It has two sources, one in the Pakkamalai hills and one in the mountains of Melmalayanur. They join near Thenpalai village to form the main river. The course of the river is generally southeastwards. Annamangalam surplus joins near Melacheri. Then the river turns south in eastern part of Singavaram village and then flows east again. Second tributary Nariyar Odai joins Sankaraparani near Uranithangal village.

Near Vallam village, the river turns southeast to flow toward of Rettanai, Nedimozhiyanur, towards Veedur Dam. The third tributary Thondiar joins near Vidur. The Vidur reservoir across Sankaraparani is situated just below.

From Vidur reservoir, Sankaraparani flows southeast. Pambaiyar tributary joins near Radhapuram. Then Sankaraparani enters Puducherry Union Territory at Manalipet. Pambai tributary joins Sankaraparani near Sellipet.

Then Guduvaiyar River, the last tributary joins near Boat House. At this point, Sankaraparani is also called Chunnambar. From here it flows for 2 kilometres (1.2 mi) before draining into Bay of Bengal at Paradise Beach.

The total length of the river is 78.5 kilometres (48.8 mi). Of the total length, 34 kilometres (21 mi) flows in Puducherry.

== Tributaries ==
Sankaraparani river has six tributaries namely:

- Annamangalam surplus
- Nariyar Odai
- Thondiar
- Pambaiyar
- Pambai
- Guduvaiyar

== Distributary ==
The only distributary of Sankaraparani is Ariyankuppam River that branches near Thirukanchi.

== History of a flood in times bygone ==
There is a history that there was once great flooding of this river. The exact timing of the flood may need experts in history to tell us. However, the two proofs are: (1) The fossil park at Tiruvakkarai is about 1–2 km away from the river and located on a hillock. The ASI maintained park mentions that there was a great flood once that would have washed away all the logs of trees on the hillock which have been preserved as fossils since then.

(2) A visit to the Gangai Varaha Nadeeswarar Koil at ThiruKaanchi also gave us a similar history (Varalaru) from the priests of the temple. That the village was once severely flooded and the temple was destroyed. The main deities were however saved and the temple rebuilt at the present location.

== Temples ==
Ancient temples are located on the banks of Sankaraparani. Out of 22 Paadal Petra Sthalam in Nadu Naadu, four temples are located on the banks of Sankaraparani. Among the temples Gangai Varaga Natheeswarar Temple located at Thirukanchi in Puducherry named after this river 'Varaga Nathi'. The name suggests that this river 'Sankaraparani' has the same power as of 'Gangai Nathi' (The River Ganges) as per Hindu Mythology. Every year in the Tamil month of 'Maasi' (Feb-March) during the 'Magam' Nachathiram day this temple festival is celebrated. 'Maasi Magam' - ten days festival is celebrated including car festival on the ninth day.

=== Villupuram district ===
Temples in Villupuram district include:

- Ranganathar Koil, Singavaram
- Ramanatheeswarar Koil, Esalam
- Akkarai Kali Amman Koil, Nedi Mozhiyanoor (sd)
- Azhagiyanathar Koil, Thiruvaamaathur (Paadal Petra Sthalam)
- Panankatteesar Koil, Puravar Panankattur (Paadal Petra Sthalam)
- Chandarasekarar Temple, Thiruvakarai (Paadal Petra Sthalam)

=== Puducherry ===
Temples in Puducherry district include:

- Mahedevar Koil, Madagadipet
- Perumal Koil, Thirubhuvanai
- Vadugurnathar Koil, Thiruvandarkoil (Vadukkur)(Paadal Petra Sthalam)
- Thirukameswarar Koil, Villianur
- Gangai Varaha Natheeswarar Koil, Thirukanchi
- Kasi Viswanathar temple, Odhiampattu

== Tourism ==
- Vidur Reservoir
- Ossudu Lake Boat House, Poraiyur Agaram
- Chunnambar Boat House, Ariyankuppam

Resorts include Le Pondy, Kailash Beach Resort, and The Windflower Resort and Spa

== See also ==
- List of rivers of Puducherry
- List of rivers of Tamil Nadu
