= Vanjiar River =

Branch of Cauvery River

Vanjiar River is a branch river of Cauvery River. It flows through the districts of Thanjavur and Karaikal. This river finally merges with Arasalar River.
