= Puravadayanar River =

Puravadayanar River is a branch river of Cauvery River in India. It flows through Karaikal district. It joins the Bay of Bengal near Karaikal Port.
