= Noolaar River =

River in Tamil Nadu, India

Noolaar River is a river flowing through Thiruvarur district, Tamil Nadu, India.

== See also ==
List of rivers of Tamil Nadu
