= Uzhiapathu =

Uzhiapathu is a sub- village in Karaikal taluk. It is one of the sub-villages in the Keezhamanai village of this taluk.

== History ==
Before 1739 Karaikal was under the regime and control of Raja Pratap Singh of Tanjore. In 1738, Dumas, a shrewd calculative prudent man and a lover of peace and above all one who was anxious to extend the French territory in India by smooth means, negotiated with Sahuji of Thanjavur for possession of Karaikal, the fortress of Karakalcheri and five village for 40,000 chakras. On 14 February 1739 the French took possession of Karaikal town, the fort of Karakalcheri and eight dependent villages. At this point, the King of Thanjavur raised the price for the town of Karaikal and the fort of Karakalcheri to 50,000 chakras.

He also demanded a loan of 150,000 chakras without interest repayable in three years against the hypothecation of Mayavaram lands, and an annual rent of 4,000 pagodas for five villages. The French agreed to all the terms except for the payment of 150,000 chakras, which was then reduced to 10,000 chakras, while the annual rental was reduced to two or three thousand chakras. The villages so received were Kilaiyur, Melaiyur, Puduthurai, Kovilpathu and Tirumalairayanpattinam. Subsequently, two villages were ceded to the French. Pratap Singh, who succeeded the throne, renewed the demand for a loan of 100,000 chakras, and on receipt of the first instalment of 4,000 chakras he assigned eight more villages to the French viz., Codague (Kondagai), Vanjiyur, Arimullimangalam, Niravi, Dharmapuram, Uzhiapathu, Mattakudi (probably Mathalangudi) and Polagam. Then on 12 February 1740, he sold these villages for 60,000 chakras, which he had assigned only the previous year for 40,000 chakras.
