= Karaikal taluk =

Coordinates: 10.932701°N 79.831853°E

Karaikal taluk is a taluk of Karaikal District of Puducherry, India. It consists of one municipality, Karaikal and the following revenue villages:

- Poovam
- Thiruvettakudy
- Varichikudy
- Kil Vanjiyur
- Mel Vanjiyur
- Keezhaiyur
- Polagam

Apart from the above revenue villages, Karaikal taluk includes the following commune panchayats.

- Neravy
- Tirumalarajanpattinam
- Kottucheri

The taluk headquarters is located at Karaikal.

== See also ==
- Konnakavaly
