= List of communes of Puducherry =

Puducherry consists of 10 communes. Out of these, five communes are located in Puducherry district and the other five are located in Karaikal district

Puducherry is composed of three blocks, five municipalities, and ten communes. Puducherry and Karaikal have five communes each. The communes sub-divide into 98 village Panchayats. The administrative control of the communes resides with the Local Administration Department of the Government of Puducherry. Each commune is administered by a Commissioner. Birth and death registration take place in the offices of the communes. Various other licenses are issued by these offices.

== List of communes: district and block wise ==
=== Puducherry District ===
Puducherry District comprises 71 Village Panchayats, five communes and two blocks, 2 municipalities.

=== Olugarate Municipality ===
==== Ariyankuppam Block ====
The three communes in Ariyankuppam Block are:

- Ariyankuppam Commune - 11 Village Panchayats
- Bahour Commune - 15 Village Panchayts
- Nettapakkam Commune - 11 Village Panchayats

==== Villianur Block ====
The 2 communes in Villianur Block are:

- Villianur Commune - 18 Village Panchayats
- Mannadipet Commune - 16 Village Panchayats

=== Karaikal District ===
Karaikal district comprises 27 Village Panchayats, five communes and one block.

==== Karaikal Block ====
The 5 communes in Karaikal Block are:

- Kottucherry Commune - 5 Village Panchayats
- Nedungadu Commune - 4 Village Panchayats
- Neravy Commune - 4 Village Panchayats
- Thirunallar Commune - 9 Village Panchayats
- Tirumalairayanpattinam Commune - 5 Village Panchayats
