= T. R. Pattinam taluk =

Coordinates: 10.868°N 79.830°E

T. R. Pattinam taluk (Thirumalairayanpattinam taluk) is a taluk in Karaikal district, Puducherry union territory, India. It contains 5 villages and 10 sub villages or hamlets.

== Villages in T.R. Pattinam taluk ==
- Thirumalairajanpattinam
- Polagam, Karaikal
- Keezhaiyur (North)
- Keezhaiyur (South)
- Vanjore

== Sub villages in T.R.Pattinam taluk ==
1. Thirumalairajanpattinam
2. Keezhavanjore
3. Melavanjore
4. Keezhavanjore Kuppam
5. Keezhaiyur (North)
6. Keezhaiyur (South)
7. Polagam, Karaikal
8. Nayaneekattalai
9. Melayurpet
10. Padutharkollai
