= Konnakavaly =

Konnakavaly is a revenue village in the Karaikal taluk of Karaikal District. It is situated to the north of Kottucheri town.
