= Oduthurai =

Coordinates: 10.9078820692°N 79.836190389°E

Oduthurai is a village in Puducherry, India. It is one of the three revenue villages in Neravy Taluk, Karaikal district. It is located west from Karaikal city.
