= Patchur, Karaikal =

Coordinates: 12°36′N 78°28′E

Patchur, Karaikal is a small revenue village (hamlet) in Karaikal taluk, Karaikal district, Puducherry, India. This area is mostly famous for the Sri Dharmasasta Ayyapan Temple. This is the only Ayyapan temple in the Karaikal region.
