= Neravy taluk =

Coordinates: 10.89°N 79.82°E

Neravy taluk (also called as Neravy Firka) is one of the six taluk of the Karaikal district, Puducherry Union Territory, India.This taluk contains 3 villages and 6 sub villages which is also called hamlets.

== Villages in Neravy Taluk ==
The three villages in Neravy taluk are:

- Vizhithiyur
- Oduthurai
- Neravy

== Sub villages in Neravy taluk ==
The six sub villages in Neravy taluk are:

- Vizhithiyur
- Kottupalayam
- Manamutti
- Kela Oduthurai
- Mela Oduthurai
- Neravy
