= List of airports in Puducherry =

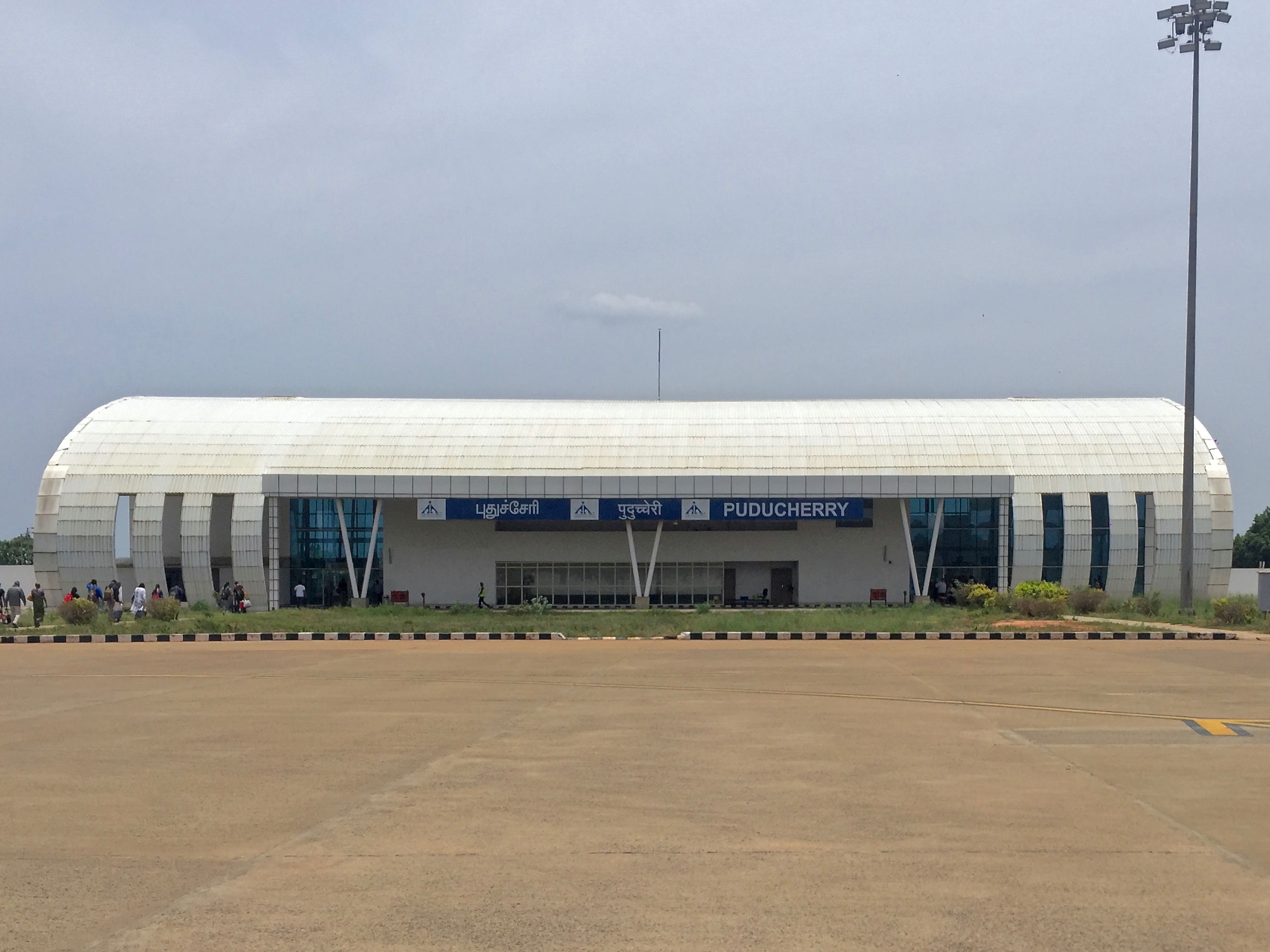
Pondicherry Airport

The Indian union territory of Puducherry has only one operational airport named Pondicherry Airport. A second greenfield airport is under construction at Karaikal with the district administration engaging CIAL, the operators of Cochin International Airport to advise it on carrying the airport project forward.

== List ==
The list includes the airports in Puducherry with their respective ICAO and IATA codes.

List of airports in Puducherry
Sl. no.	Location in Puducherry	Airport name	ICAO	IATA	Operator	Category	Role
1	Pondicherry	Pondicherry Airport	VOPC	PNY	Airports Authority of India	Domestic	Commercial
2	Karaikal	Karaikal Airport	—	—	TBC	Domestic (Planned)	Commercial
