= Vanjore =

Coordinates: 10.8266556364°N 79.837872490°E

Vanjore is a village in T. R. Pattinam taluk, Karaikal district, Puducherry Union territory. This is divided into three sub villages for revenue purposes namely Keezhavanjore, Melavanjore, and Keezhavanjore Kuppam.

The Karaikal port is located in the part of Keezhavanjore.
