= Keezhakasakudy =

Village in Puducherry, India

Coordinates: 10.951°N 79.831°E

Keezhakasakudy is a revenue village in Karaikal taluk of Karaikal district. It is located in north of the Karaikal city.
