= List of educational institutions in Karaikal, India =

The following is a list of educational institutions in Karaikal, India, one of the four districts of the Union Territory of Puducherry.

== Medical Colleges ==
1. Jawaharlal Institute of Postgraduate Medical Education and Research
2. Vinayaka Mission's Medical College

== Engineering and agricultural colleges ==
1. Bharathiyar College of Engineering and Technology
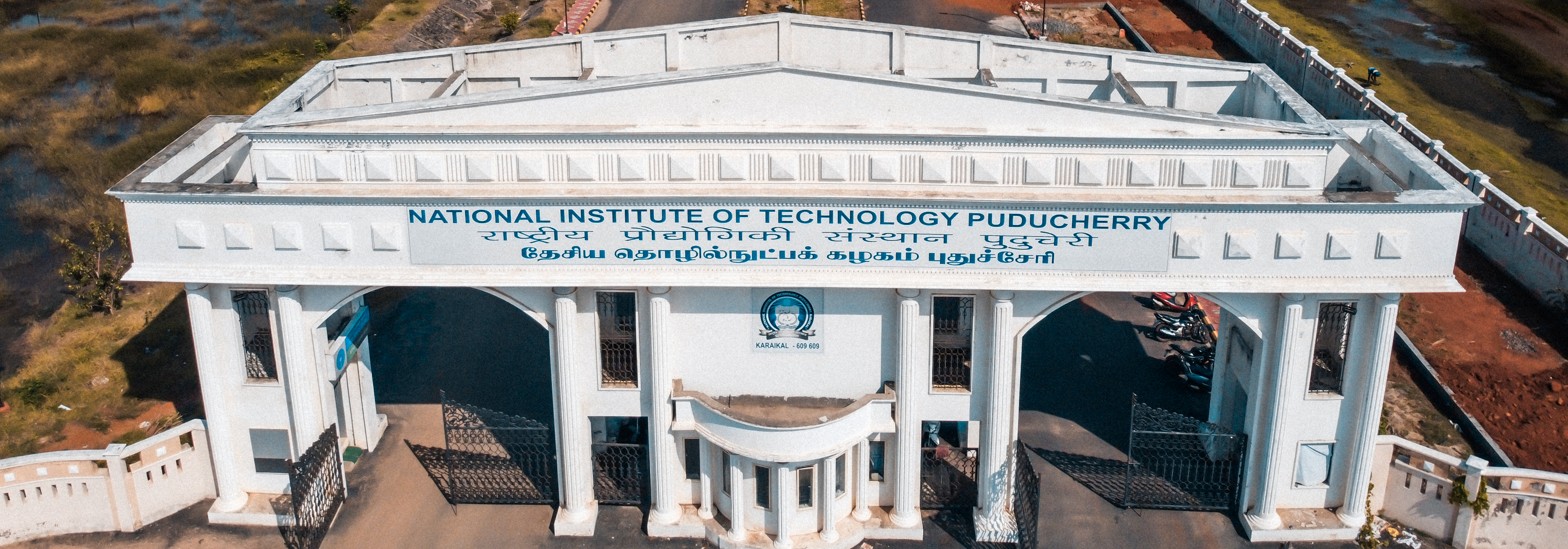
2. NIT Puducherry
  National Institute of Technology Puducherry
3. R.V.S College of Engineering and Technology
4. Perunthalaivar Kamarajar Institute of Engineering and Technology
5. Pandit Jawaharlal Nehru College of Agriculture and Research Institute

== University ==
1. Pondicherry University

== General colleges ==
1. Aringar Anna Govt. Arts College
2. Avvaiyar Govt College for Women
3. RVS Arts and Science College, Kalikuppam
4. Karaikal college of Education
5. Don Bosco College (Arts & Science), Thamanangudy, Ambagarathur
6. Don Bosco College of Arts and Science, Karaikal

== ITI ==
1. Karaikal Govt. Polytechnic
2. Govt. I.T.I. for Women
3. Govt. I.T.I. for Men

== School ==
1. Annai Theresa Govt. Girls Higher secondary school
2. Adarsh concept school, Kottuchery
3. Aiyas English School
4. Cauvery Public School
5. Crescent High School, Ambagarathur
6. Don Bosco Higher Secondary School, Nedungadu
7. Good Shepherd English School, Melakasakudi
8. Govindasamy Pillai High School
9. Vruksha Montessori Internationale School
10. Govt. French school
11. Govt. Girls high school, Thalatheru
12. Govt. Girls high school, T.R. Pattinam.
13. Govt. high school, kovilpathu.
14. Govt. higher secondary school, T.R. Pattinam
15. Govt. higher secondary school, Thenur
16. Govt. higher secondary school, Niravy
17. Govt. higher secondary school, Nedungadu
18. Govt. higher secondary school, Kottucherry
19. Govt. high school, Karaikalmedu
20. Govt. high school, Sethur
21. Govt. high school, Poovam
22. Govt. high school, Kottucherry
23. Govt. high school, Thalatheru
24. Govt. high school, T.R. Pattinam
25. Govt. high school, Kurumbakaram
26. Govt. high school, Vizhithiyur
27. Govt. high school, Akkaraivattam
28. Jawahar Navodaya Vidyalaya
29. Kendriya Vidyalaya
30. K.M.K. Kannaiya Pillai Memorial School
31. M.E.S. High School, Masthan Palli Street
32. Murugathal Achi Govt. Girls higher secondary school
33. ONGC public school
34. Regional Perfect Higher Secondary School, Nedungadu
35. Swami Vivekananda higher secondary school, Ambagarathur
36. St.Mary's Higher Secondary school
37. Servite high school, Kottucherry
38. St. Joseph French cluny
39. Thanthai Periyar Govt Higher Secondary School
40. Thiruvalluvar Govt Higher Secondary school, Ambagarathur
41. Iqra Nursery & Primary School
42. Green World Management Consultancy & Training Institute
43. Galaxy Indian High School, Bismi Nagar
44. Universal Academy, Niravy
