= Vizhithiyur =

Coordinates: 10.905°N 79.746°E

Vizhithiyur is a village in Puducherry, India. It is one of the three revenue villages in Neravy Taluk, Karaikal district. It is located west from Karaikal city.
