= Rajacholeesvarar Temple =

Coordinates: 10.870870613°N 79.827315104°E

Rajacholeesvarar Temple is a Hindu temple dedicated to the deity Shiva, located at Thirumalairayanpattinam in Karaikal district, in Puducherry, India.

== Vaippu Sthalam ==
It is one of the shrines of the Vaippu Sthalams sung by Tamil Saivite Nayanar Sundarar. This place is also called as Thirupattinam.

== Presiding deity ==
The presiding deity in the garbhagriha, represented by the lingam, is known as Rajacholeesvarar. The Goddess is known as Abirami.

== Specialities ==
This is the capital city of Saluva Thirumalairyan, as representative of Vijayanagara kings in 15th century C.E. The river which was set up by him was known as Thirumalairayan river. Kalamegam was the poet in his ministry. In the prakara sculptures of 63 nayanmars are found. Manikkavacakar is also found there. Pujas are held to these nayanmars. Chandiesvarar sculpture made of a special green stone is found here. Around the temple Nagalinga pushpa trees are found. Among other places, Shiva is found in Ramesvaram, Thiruturutti, Neitthanam, Keezhayil and this place.

== Structure ==
Just before the shrine of the presiding deity, Dvarapalas are found on either side. Shrines of Vinayaka, Subramania, Gajalakshmi, Navagraha, Marutalinga, Bairava and Surya are found in this temple. In the front mandapa, Vinayaka and Sanisvara are found on either side of the entrance.

== Location ==
The temple is located at Thirumalairayanpattinam in Karaikal-Nagapattinam road in between Karaikal and Nagore. It is opened for worship from 6.00 to 12.00 a.m. and 5.00 to 8.30 p.m.
