= Tirumalairayanpattinam railway station =

Railway station in Tamil Nadu, India

Tirumalairayanpattinam திருமலைராயன்பட்டினம்
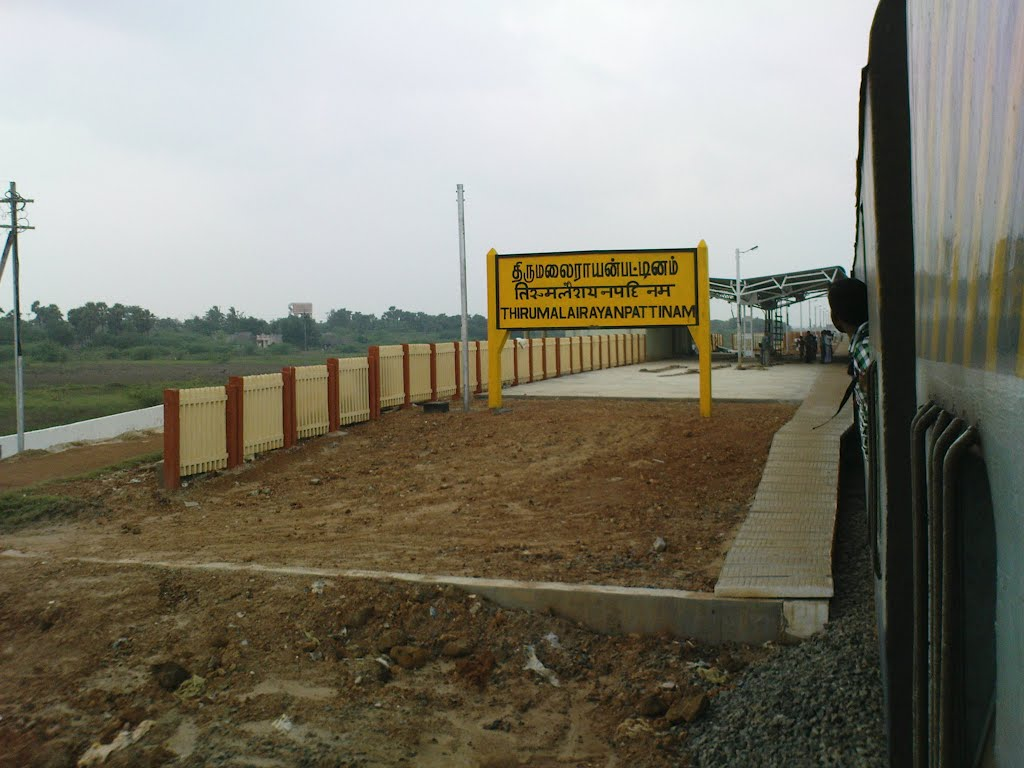
- Tirumalairayanpattinam railway station

General information
- Location: Tirumalairayanpattinam, Karaikal district, Puducherry, Tamil Nadu; India
- Coordinates: 10.8764°N 79.8399°E
- Elevation: 3 metres (9.8 ft)
- System: Light rail and Goods railway station
- Owner: Indian Railways
- Operator: Southern Railway zone
- Platforms: 1
- Tracks: 2

Construction
- Structure type: Standard (on ground station)
- Parking: Yes
- Accessible: Disabled access

Other information
- Status: Functioning
- Station code: TMPT
- Zone(s): Southern Railway zone
- Division(s): Tiruchirappalli

History
- Opened: 19 June 2015; 11 years ago
Route map
Location

Tirumalairayanpattinam railway station is a railway station in Tirumalairayanpattinam, Karaikal district, Puducherry, India.

== Jurisdiction ==
It belongs to the Tiruchirappalli railway division of the Southern Railway zone in Karaikal district in Puducherry. The station code is TMPT.

== About ==
This is only passenger station falls between Karaikal–Nagore broad-gauge section, which was opened for service on 19 June 2015.

== Notable places nearby ==
- Aayiram Kaali Amman Temple
