= Patchur =

Patchur may refer to:

- Patchur, Karaikal, a village in Karaikal district, Puducherry, India
- Patchur, a village near Natrampalli, Vellore district, Tamil Nadu, India
