= Karakal =

Karakal may refer to:

- Caracal, a medium-sized wild cat; Karakal is a common spelling in German and some other European languages
- Karaikal, a city and municipality in the Union Territory of Puducherry, India
