= Tiruchengattangudi =

Village in Nagapattinam District, Tamil Nadu

Tiruchengathangudi is a village in the Thirumarugal Block in the Nagapattinam District of Tamil Nadu state. It is on the border of the Nagapattinam, Karaikal and Thiruvarur districts. This village is located close to the Pondicherry state border and 292 kilometres (181 mi) from the state capital Chennai.

== Demographic ==
Tamil is the village's local language.

== Transport ==
The closest railway station to Tiruchengathangudi is Nannilam Railway Station and Punthottam Railway Station. Tiruchengathangudi can also be reachedlace by bus; the nearest bus stops are Thirumarugal, Puragramam, Settur Village and EB.
