= Karaikal Beach =

Beach in Puducherry, India

Coordinates: 10.918°N 79.853°E

Karaikal Beach is a popular beach in the coastal area of Karaikal city, Puducherry, India. It lies on the Bay of Bengal. The beach is one of the best natural beaches in the region of Southeastern Tamil Nadu.

The Arasalar River forms the estuary near Karaikal Beach. The beach is two kilometers wide. Its accessibility has been made easier by widening the road along the Arasalar River and illumination by sodium vapour lamps. To attract the locals and outside tourists, fountains, children's parks, restaurants, and tennis courts have been constructed in the area. Due to these, the Karaikal beach attracts a heavy crowd of people each day. Note: Citation 3 is a dead link, the article barely avoids plagiarism of link #2.

== Entertainment ==
- Park
- Hotel
- Lighthouse
- Fountains
- Various shops are entertaining things present near the beach.
