= Keezhaiyur =

Keezhaiyur கீழையூர் Kijéour
- village
- Location in India
- Coordinates: 11°07′57″N 79°44′57″E
- Country: India
- State: Puducherry
- District: Karaikal
- Talukas: Karaikal

Languages
  - Official: French, Tamil, English
- Time zone: UTC+5:30 (IST)

Keezhaiyur is a revenue village in the Karaikal taluk of Karaikal District. It is situated at a distance of about 6 kilometres south-east of Karaikal town and 2 kilometres east of Tirumalarajanpattinam commune.
