= Polagam, Karaikal =

Coordinates: 10°54′N 79°43′E

Polagam is a revenue village in the Karaikal taluk of Karaikal District. It is situated at a distance of about 8 kilometres south-west of Karaikal town and 2 kilometres south of Tirumalarajanpattinam commune.
