= Keezhavanjore =

Keezhavanjore is a sub-village of Vanjore village in Karaikal district in the union territory of Puducherry, India. Major port in the east coast of India, Marg Karaikal port is situated in Keezhavanjore. Keezhavanjore village panchayat comes under T.R. Pattinam commune panchayat.
