= Keezhamanai =

Coordinates: 10.909°N 79.786°E

Keezhamanai is a revenue village in Karaikal taluk, Karaikal district, Puducherry Union territory, India. It is one of several revenue villages within the Karaikal region.
