= Karaikal Carnival =

Cultural festival in Karaikal, Puducherry, India

Karaikal Carnival is a cultural festival organised by the Karaikal tourism department during the Pongal Festival in Karaikal, one of the four parts of the Union Territory of Puducherry, to promote tourism in the district.

== Events ==
The events of the Carnival include competitive ingredients, lot of cultural and sporting events such as Marathon, Cycle Race, and Bullock cart Racing, for students and the public. The carnival aims at identifying talents of youths of Karaikal and nurturing them. To achieve this goal, an exclusive light music programme was organised in which a number of youths from Karaikal participated.

== Entertainment elements ==
The entertainment included cinematic attractions such as folk music by popular artists and Orchestras.

== Airshow ==
In 2007, the carnival had its first airshow. Performed by the personnel of the Indian Air Force, members parachuted out of a helicopter from a height of 3,000 feet (910 m).

== Flotilla ==
A flotilla will be constructed in Arasalar River at Beach Road where one can dine in amidst the water.

== Carnival Song ==
A song was composed by Mr. Natarajan, the son of 'Kalaikavalar' Karai Subbaiya and was played for audience at the valedictory function in 2007. The song can be downloaded. and was named "Carnival Song".
