= Tirumalarajanar River =

Coordinates: 10°53′N 79°51′E

Tirumalarajanar River is a distributary of the Kudamurutti River which, itself, is a distributary of the river Kaveri. It branches off from the Kudamurutti near Papanasam and flows through the districts of Thanjavur, Tiruvarur and Nagapattinam in Tamil Nadu and the Neravy and Tirumalarajanpattinam communes of the Karaikal District of Puducherry before joining the Bay of Bengal near Tirumalarajanpattinam.
