= Aayiram Kaliamman Temple =

Temple in Puducherry, India

Coordinates: 10°55′25″N 79°49′48″E

Aayiram Kaliamman Temple is an ancient temple in Tirumalairayanpattinam (T.R.Pattinam). The temple is much famous for the main deity, Goddess Kaliamman's statue is made up of wood.

== History ==
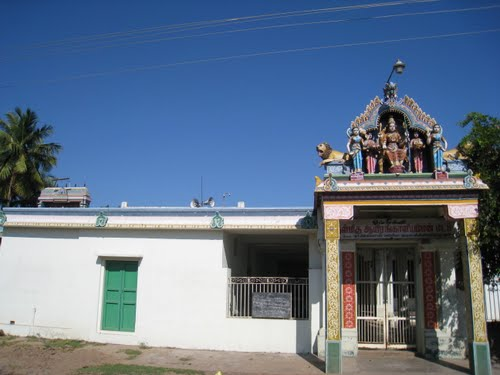
Aayiram Kaali Amman Aalayam Temple

According to legend, a devotee belonging to Senguntha Mudaliar caste dreamt that he collects a box with an idol of Goddess Kaliamman on the seacoast. The next day he really found a silver box with an idol on the seacoast, along with a palm leaf inscription. The palm leaf inscription indicated that this deity has to be worshipped with 1000 items daily.

But the community decided to conduct pooja for once in 5 years, as performing pooja with 1000 ritualistic object daily is impossible. During the Tamil month of Vaikasi (May–June), the festival is conducted for every 5 years.

== Festival ==
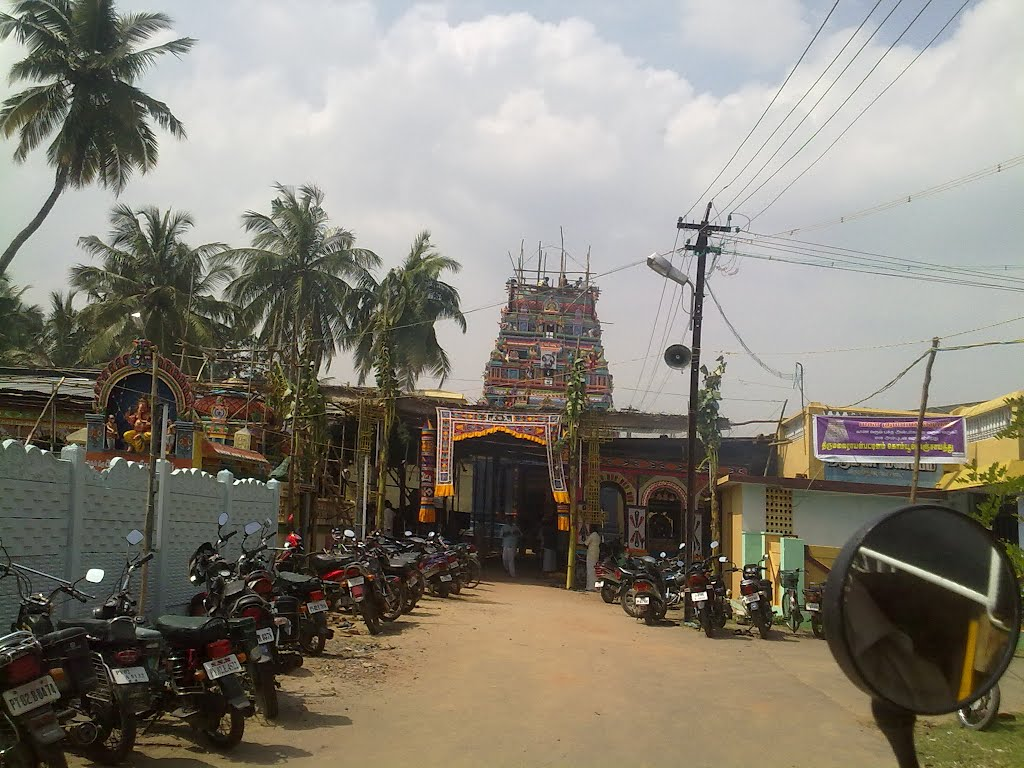
Arulmigu Abhirami Amman Aalayam

Every five years, a special pooja is performed with 1000 items. This special pooja at Aayiramkaliamman Temple attracts devotees from all over Tamil Nadu and Puducherry.

== Goddess idol ==
The goddess is entirely made of wood. Every part of her body is kept individually in a wooden box.
