= Serumavilangai =

Village in India

Coordinates: 10.955828078°N 79.7762609°E

Serumavilangai (also spelled as Serumavillangai) is a small village in the Thirunallar Commune of the Karaikal District in the Union Territory of Puducherry, India.

Serumavilangai is an agrarian society, known for Pandit Jawaharlal Nehru College of Agriculture (PAJANCOA, established in 1987, and Perunthalaivar Kamarajar Institute of Technology (PKIET), established in 2007.
