= Avvaiyar Govt College for Women =

Coordinates: 11.1280235340°N 80.017725399°E

Avvaiyar Govt College for Women is one of the government colleges in Karaikal reserved only for women, by the government of Puducherry.

It was started in the year 1972 under affiliation of Madras University. Now affiliated with Pondicherry University. At first the college was started only for Arts & Science Department. Later departments of History, English Literature, Botany, Mathematics, Chemistry, Physics and Home Science were started according to the wishes of the women students.

== Departments in the college ==
In 1972 while the college was started there was only a single department, the Arts & Science Dept.

- B.A. History was started in the academic year of 1973–74.
- B.A. English Literature was started in the academic year of 1976–77
- B.Sc Botany was started in the academic year of 1977–78
- B.Sc Mathematics was started in the academic year of 1978–79
- B.Sc Chemistry was started in the academic year of 1980–81
- B.Com or Commerce Department was started in the academic year 1984–85
- B.Sc Physics was started in the academic year of 1985–86
- B.Sc Home Science was started in the academic year of 1995–96.
- B.Sc Computer Science was started in the academic year of 1998–99.
- B.Com in Corporate Secretaryship was started in the academic year of 2010–11 since demands of job oriented courses.

== Post-Graduate Courses ==
The government of Puducherry started Post- graduate courses of M.A. English and M.Sc. Botany in the academic year 1997–98. In the year of 2000–01 M.A. History courses were started for the welfare of the women students.

== Address ==
The Avvaiyar Government College for Women is located in Dr. Ambedkar Street, Karaikal.

Phone:04368-222454.
