= Sundaresvarar Temple, Tiruvettakkudi =

Hindu temple in Pondicherry, India

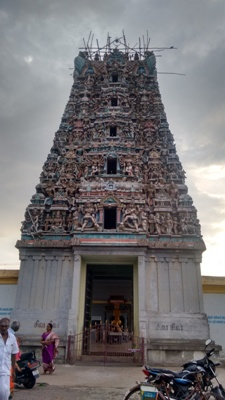
The main gopura of the temple

Tiruvettakkudi Sundareshwarar Temple (திருவேட்டக்குடி சுந்தரேசுவரர் கோயில்) is a Hindu temple located at Tiruvettakudi in the Karaikal district of the Union Territory of Pondicherry, in India. The presiding deity is Shiva. He is called as Sundareshwarar. His consort is known as Shantha Nayaki.

== Significance ==
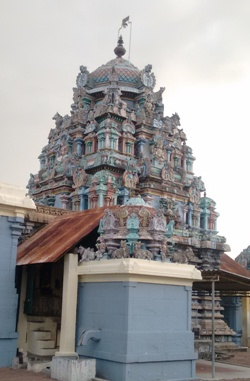
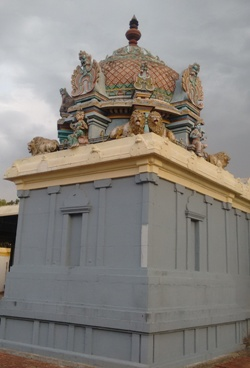
Vimanas of the presiding deity and the consort

It is one of the shrines of the 275 Paadal Petra Sthalams - Shiva Sthalams glorified in the early medieval Tevaram poems by Tamil Saivite Nayanar Tirugnanasambandar.

== Literary mention ==
Tirugnanasambandar describes the feature of the deity as:

அருமறைநான் முகத்தானு மகலிடநீ ரேற்றானும்

இருவருமா யளப்பரிய வெரியுருவாய் நீண்டபிரான்
வருபுனலின் மணியுந்தி மறிதிரையார் சுடர்ப்பவளத்

திருவுருவில் வெண்ணீற்றார் திருவேட்டக் குடியாரே.
