= Vinayaka Mission's Medical College =

Vinayaka Mission's Medical College (VMMC) is a medical college in Karaikal approved by the MCI, Govt of Puducherry and Govt of India. This institution was established as a medical college and hospital in Karaikal in the year 1996.

== Highlights ==
This college is situated in Keezhakasakudy, Karaikal. It has a 150-acre campus. It has laboratories, classrooms, museums, demonstration rooms and pre & paramedicals. Free medical services to poor patients. Has a team of doctors.
