= Our Lady of Angels Church, Karaikal =

Our Lady of Angels Church
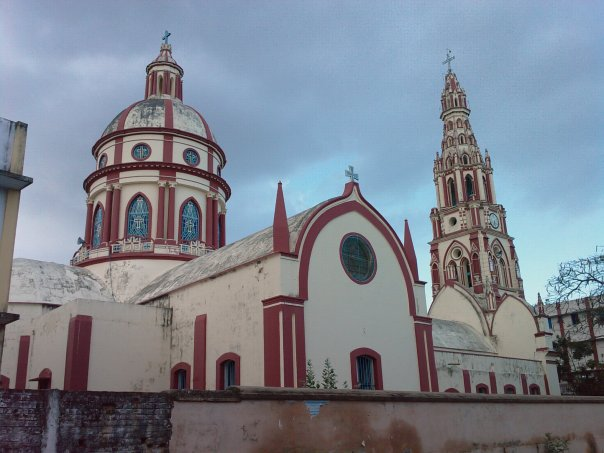
- Front view of the church

- Location within Tamil Nadu
- 10°55′01″N 79°50′03″E
- Location: Karaikal
- Country: India
- Denomination: Catholic

History
- Status: Parish church
- Founded: 1828

Architecture
- Functional status: Active
- Architectural type: Chapel
- Style: Neo-Gothic architecture

Administration
- Archdiocese: Independent diocese

Our Lady of Angels Church (also called Karaikal Church) is the oldest church in Karaikal in the Union territory of Pondicherry, in Southern India. The current structure was built in Neo-Gothic architecture by the French Colonial Empire in 1822. The original structure is believed to have been built during 1739 and was destroyed by the British. The church has the tallest structure for any building in Karaikal, raising to a height of 133 ft (41 m), built during 1891.

Our Lady of Angels Church is a working church with hourly prayer and daily services and follows Roman Catholic sect of Christianity. The Thetheravu Matha festival is a ten-day festival celebrated in the Church every year on 15 August when the festive image of Mary is taken in a chariot around the streets of the Church. The Church is one of the most prominent landmarks in Karaikal and faces the Bay of Bengal.

== Architecture ==
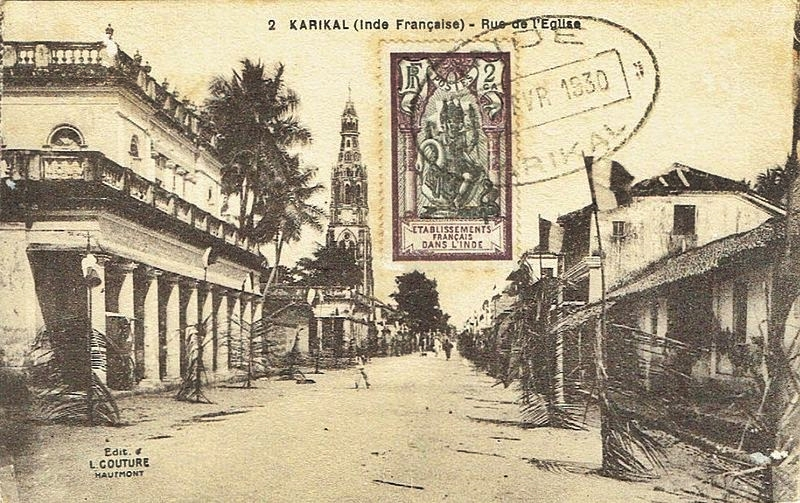
Historical view of Karaikal with the tower of the Church seen in the centre

The Church is located in Church street in Karaikal, which is believed to be named after the Church. The church is built in Neo-Gothic architecture with the main chapel, a 133 ft (41 m) tower approached through a structure with doom shaped roof and a worship hall. The top of the tower is a cone with an octagonal base and the cone houses three clocks. There are five huge bells, the sound of which can be heard as far as 5 km (3.1 mi) from its location. The Church has stained glass windows and marble altars, believed to have been added during 1739. The shrine faces the East facing the sea towards Bay of Bengal. The altar is originally believed to have a statue of Our Lady of Angels, but houses a Holy Cross in modern times. The church also houses an orphanage where 40 boys are taken care. The temple is one of the major landmarks in the town and one of the major tourist destination.

== History ==
Karaikal was bought as a colony by the French in 1750. It changed hands between British and the French like Pondicherry. The French surrendered the town to the British in 1761 and once more subsequently. The Church was built by the French during 1739 and the original structure was believed to have been built during 1739, which was destroyed by the British. When Karaikal came to the hands of the French completely by 1816 after the Treaty of Paris, the Church was rebuilt in 1828. While the original structure was built during 1822, the tower was erected during 1891.

== Culture ==
Our Lady of Angels Church has the tallest structure in Karaikal and is one of the most prominent landmarks in the town. The Church is locally called Thetheravu Matha Kovil, meaning the "temple of the mother who consoles the desolate ". The church is a working church with hourly prayer and daily services and follows Roman Catholic sect of Christianity. The priests in the church were originally French, but during modern times, Tamil people replaced them. During 15 August every year, the Thetheravu Matha festival is celebrated in the Church, with a flag hoisting on 6 August. During the festival, the festival image of Mary is taking round the streets of Karaikal in a chariot. The event is one of the most prominent festival in the region. Christianity in large numbers during the earlier part of the 19th century. Many of them and their families visited France and were socially and economically uplifted on account of education offered to the community by the Church.
