= Thiruvettakudy =

Coordinates: 10.984°N 79.839°E

Thiruvettakudy is a revenue village in the Karaikal taluk of Karaikal District. It is situated to the north of Kottucheri town. The village surrounds the Tiruvettakkudi Sundareshwarar Temple.
