= Anandan Geetha =

Indian politician

Geetha Anandan is the MLA elected from Neravy T.R.Pattinam constituency of the Karaikal district. She belongs to the party of Dravida Munnetra Kazhagam and the only DMK MLA in Karaikal region in 2016 assembly election.

== Election ==
Anandan Geetha contested as the DMK candidate in the election of 2011. V.M.C. Sivakumar, the former DMK candidate for long years, left the party and contested as an independent candidate. Geetha Anandan lost that election to him in a difference of about 300 votes.

In the election of 2016, Geetha was selected as the DMK candidate. Once again she fought against V.M.C. Sivakumar who contested the election for AIADMK. Anandan Geetha won the election defeating Sivakumar with a margin of 6936 votes. She also created history in the constituency as she emerged as the first MLA rather from Sivakumar's family. V.M.C. Sivakumar's family had dominated the constituency for about 40 years.
