= Varichikudy =

Varichikudy Varitchigoudy
- village
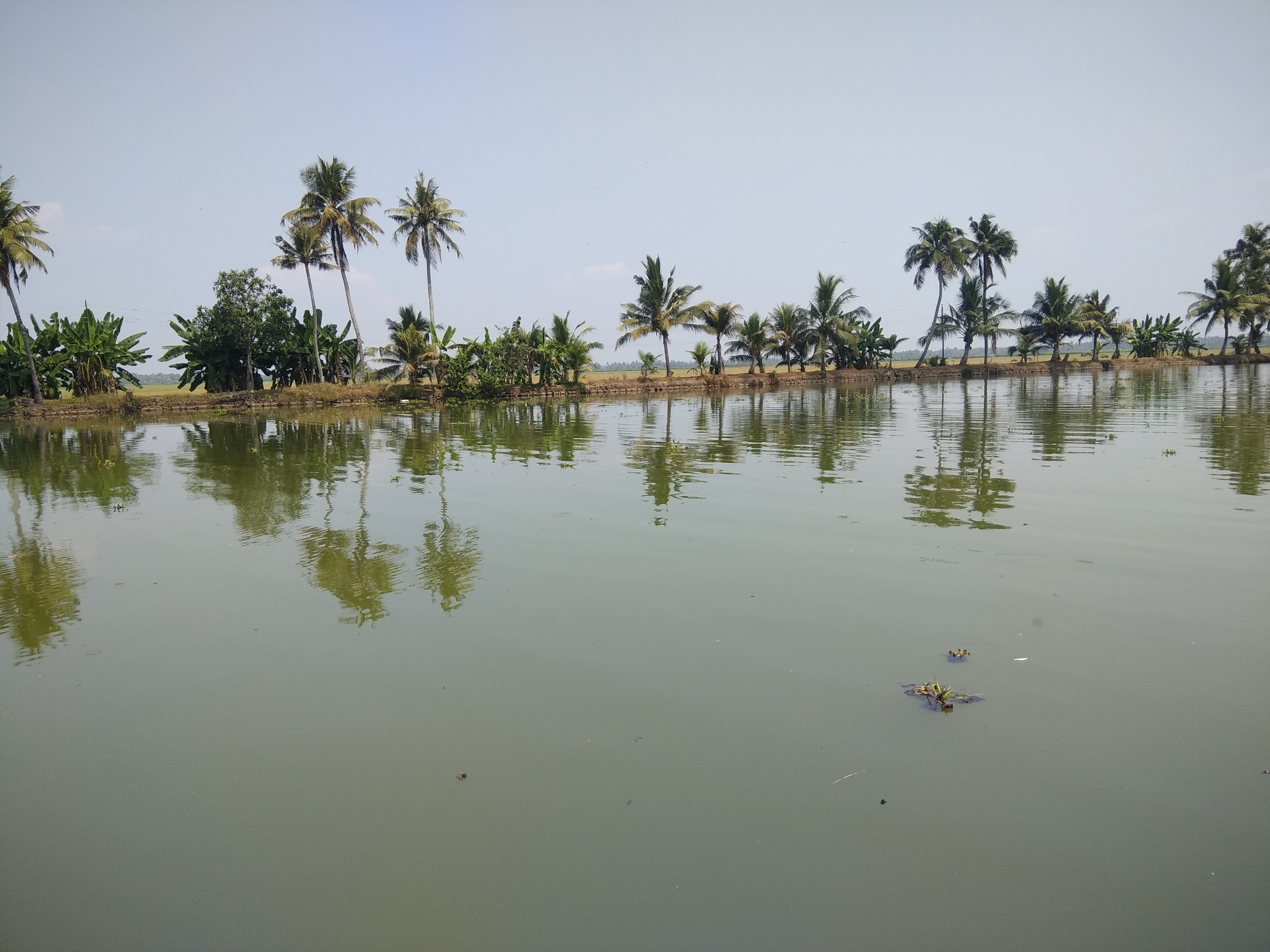
- Varchikudy pond

- Location in Karaikal District
- Coordinates: 10.9775°N 79.8214°E
- Country: India
- State: Puducherry
- District: Karaikal
- Talukas: Karaikal

Languages
  - Official: French, Tamil, English
- Time zone: UTC+5:30 (IST)

Varichikudy is a revenue village in the Kottucherry Commune of Karaikal District in the union territory of Pondicherry. It is situated at a distance of about 6 kilometres north of Karaikal town.
