= Kurumathur =

- Census Town
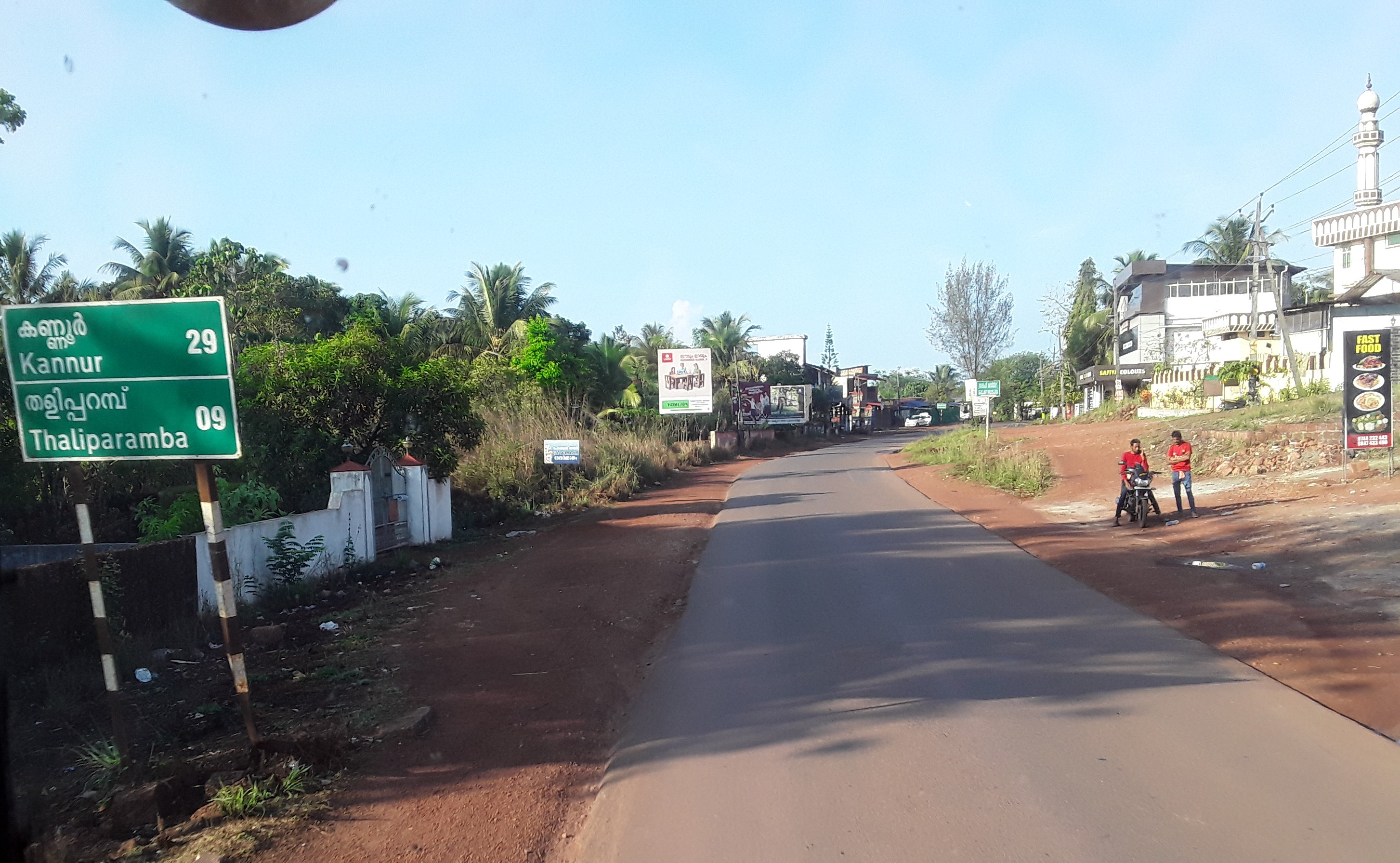
- Kurumathur

- Location in Kerala, India Kurumathur (India)
- Coordinates: 12.0326°N 75.4170°E
- Country: India
- State: Kerala
- District: Kannur

Government
  - Type: Panchayati raj (India)
  - Body: Kurumathur Grama Panchayat

Area
  - Total: 26.26 km^{2} (10.14 sq mi)

Population (2011)
  - Total: 18,641
  - Density: 709.9/km^{2} (1,839/sq mi)

Languages
  - Official: Malayalam, English
- Time zone: UTC+5:30 (IST)
- PIN: 670142
- Nearest city: Taliparamba

Kurumathur is a census town in Taliparamba taluk of Kannur district in Kerala state, India. Kurumathur is located 8 km (5.0 mi) east of Taliparamba town in SH 36.

== Demographics ==
As of 2011 Census, Kurumathur had a population of 18,641 of which 8,723 are males and 9,918 are females. Kurumathur census town spreads over an area of 26.26 km^{2} (10.14 sq mi) with 4,117 families residing in it. The sex ratio of Kurumathur was 1,137 higher than state average of 1,084. In Kurumathur, population of children under 6 years was 12.8%. Kurumathur had overall literacy of 93.4%, higher than national average of 59% and lower than state average of 94%.

As of 2011 census, Kurumathur Grama Panchayat had total population of 31,023 among which 12,382 people resides in rural village of Panniyoor and 18,641 resides in urban town of Kurumathur. Kurumathur Grama Panchayat has administration over Kurumathur census town and rural village of Panniyoor.

== Religion ==
As of 2011 Indian census, Kurumathur census town had population of 18,641 which constitutes 57.52% Hindus, 39.69% Muslims, 2.38% Christians and 0.41% others.

== Administration ==
Kurumathur census town is a part of Kurumathur Grama Panchayat. Kurumathur is politically a part of Taliparamba Assembly constituency under Kannur Loksabha constituency.

== Transportation ==
National Highway NH 66 passes through Taliparamba town. Mangalore and Mumbai can be accessed on the northern side and Kochi and Thiruvananthapuram can be accessed on the southern side. The road to the east connects to Mysore and Bangalore. The nearest railway station is Kannapuram and Pazhayangadi on Shoranur-Mangalore Section under southern railway. The nearest airports are at Kannur and Calicut.

== Gallery ==
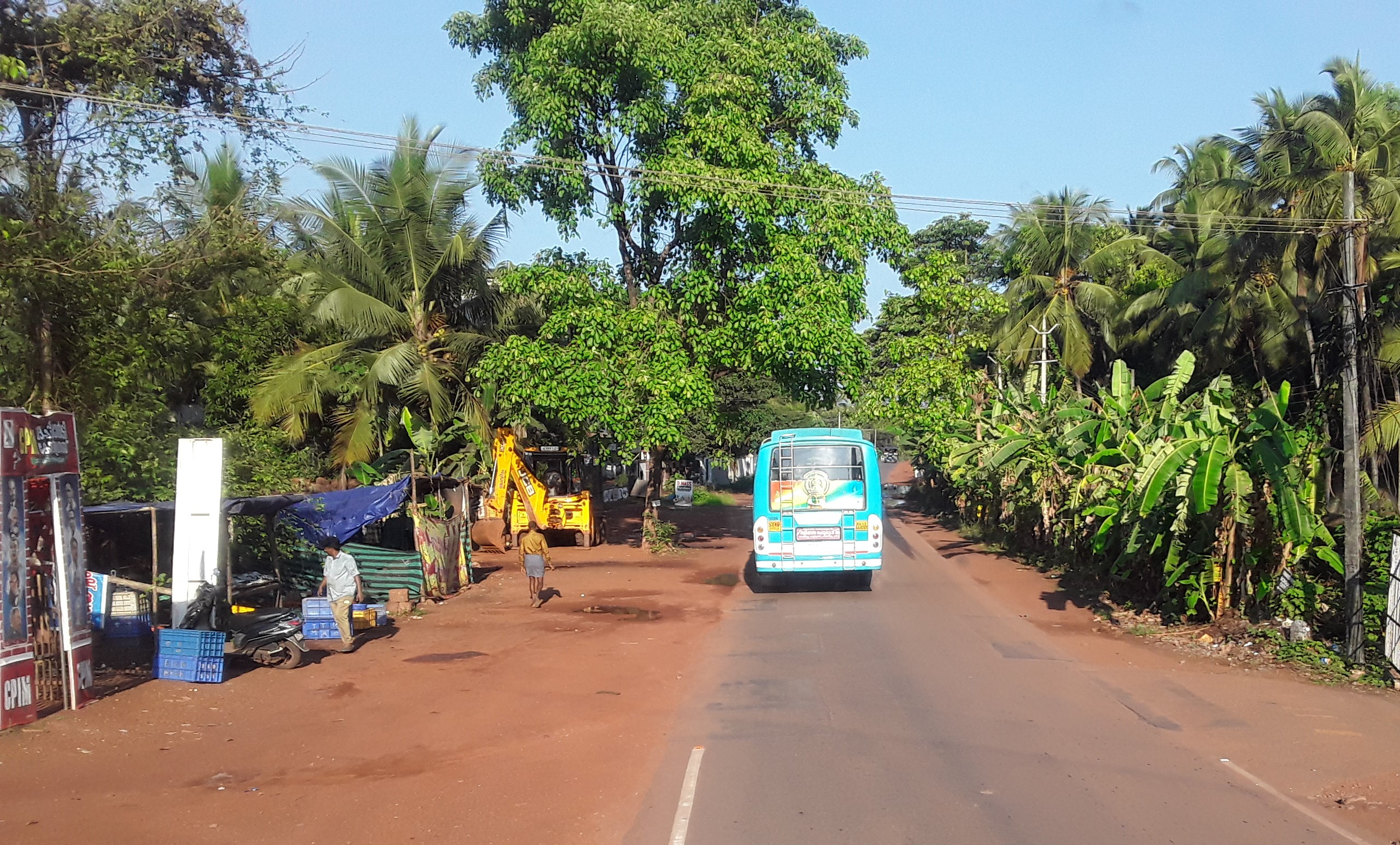

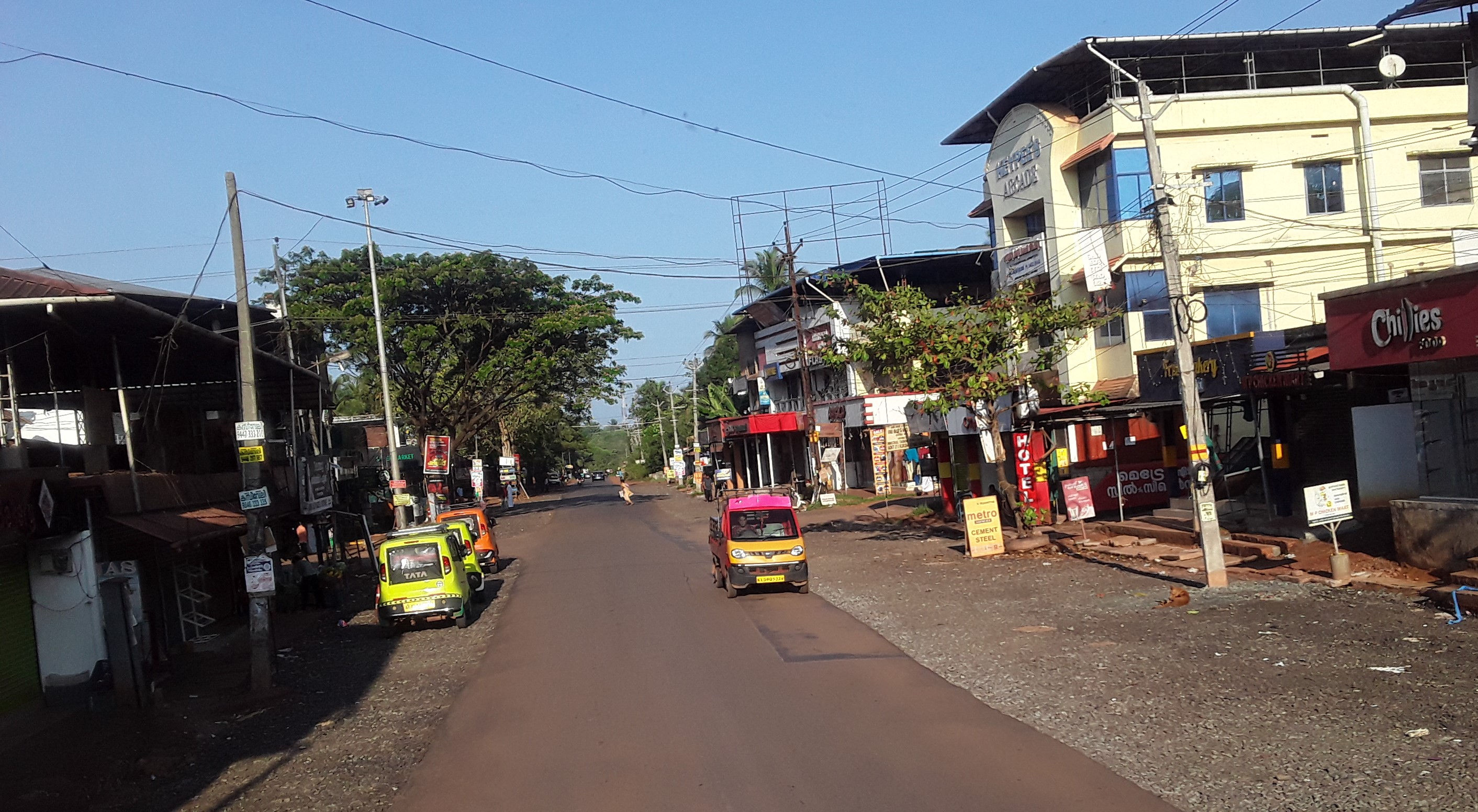

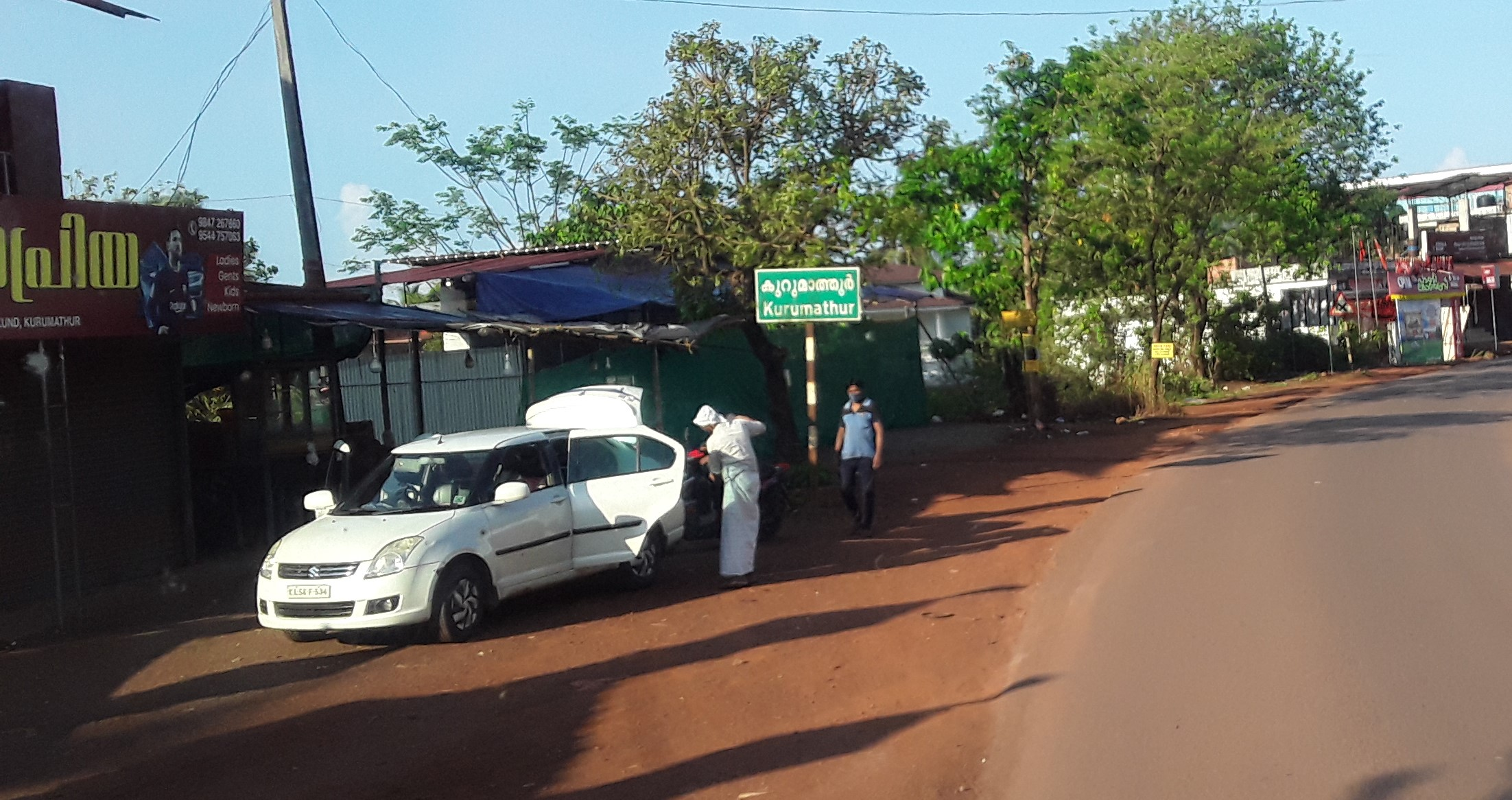

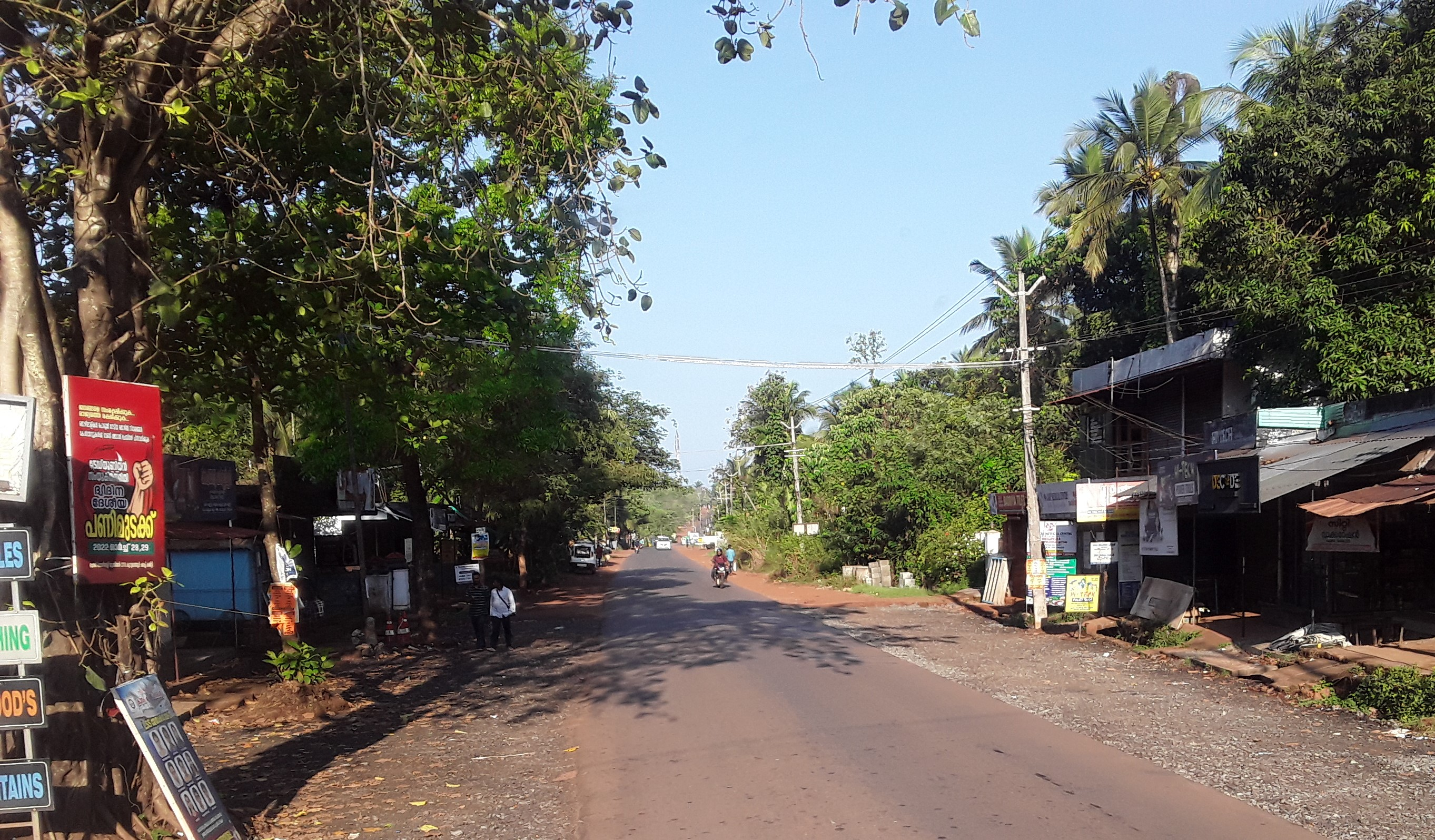

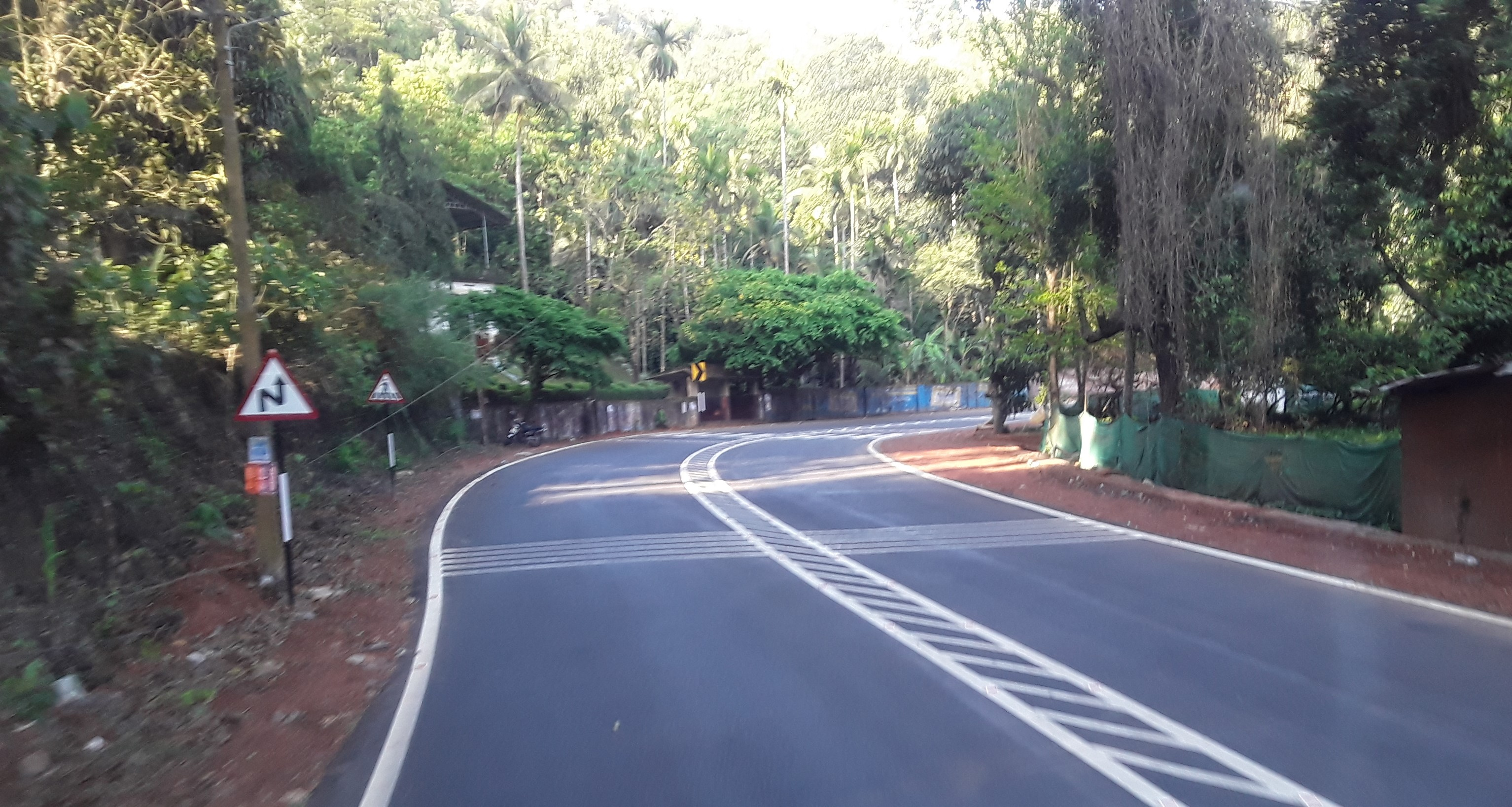

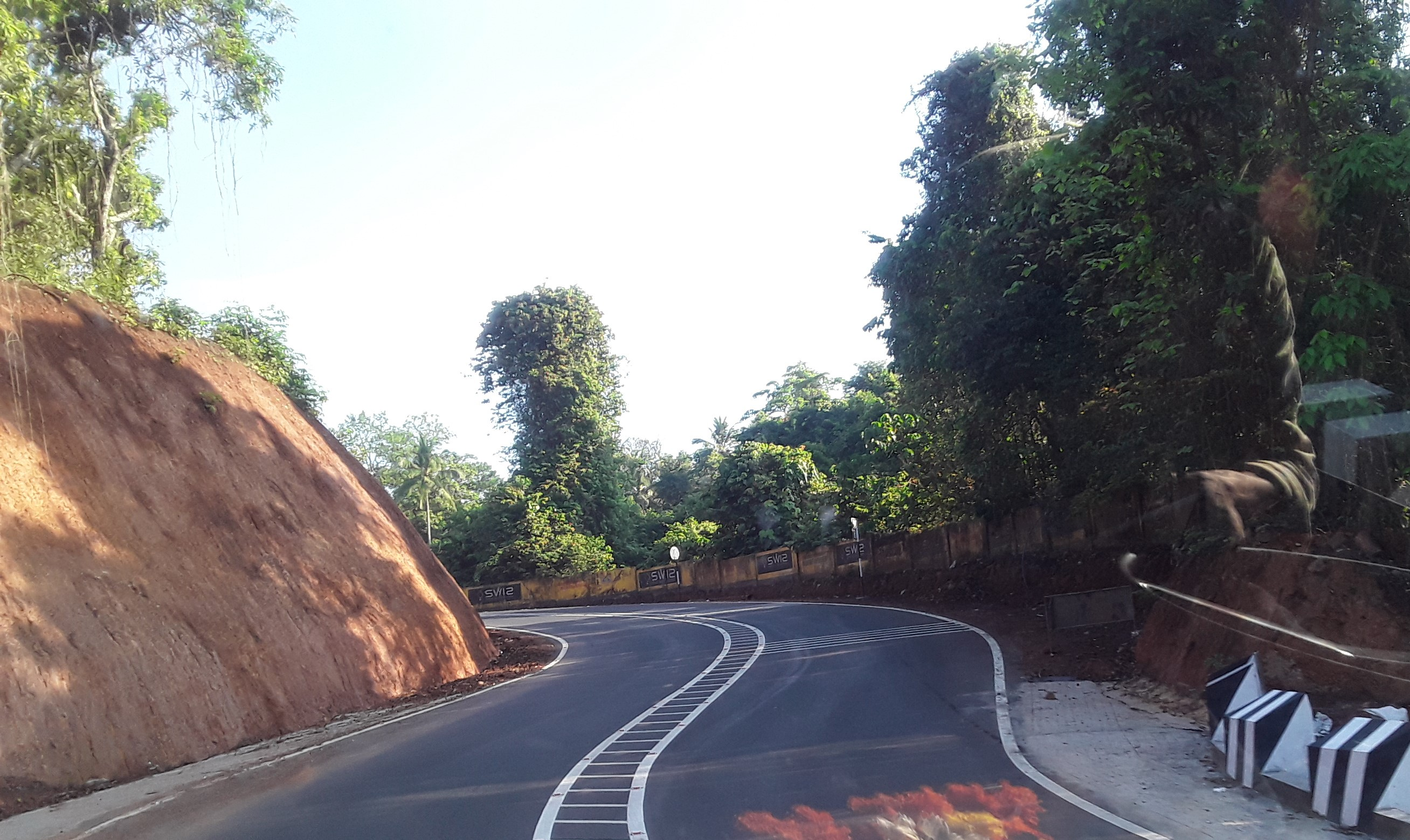
