= Kottucherry =

Kottucherry Cotchéry
- town
- Location in India
- Coordinates: 10°57′00″N 79°49′00″E
- Country: India
- State: Puducherry
- District: Karaikal

Population (2011)
  - Total: 17,442

Languages
  - Official: French, Tamil, English
- Time zone: UTC+5:30 (IST)
- Postal code: 609 609
- Vehicle registration: PY

Kottucherry is a commune in Karaikal district, in the Indian state of Puducherry. The commune comprises a village of the same name, as well as the villages of Poovam, Thiruvettakudy and Varichikudy.

== Demographics ==
According to 2011 census of India, the population of Kottucherry commune is 17442.The male population of the commune is 8688 and the female population is 8754.
