= MARG (company) =

Company of India

MARG Limited
- Formerly: Marg Constructions Ltd. (1994–2007)
- Type: Public
- Traded as: BSE: 530543; NSE: MARG
- Industry: Infrastructure
- Founded: 16 December 1994; 31 years ago
- Headquarters: Chennai, India
- Key people: G R K Reddy (Chairman & Managing Director)
- Revenue: ▲₹15.8 billion (US$160 million) (FY 2012)
- Net income: ▲₹1.10 billion (US$11 million) (FY 2012)
- Total assets: ₹1.79 billion (US$19 million) (FY 2012)
- Website: www.marggroup.com

MARG Limited (formerly known as MARG Constructions Ltd.), is an Indian construction company, based in Chennai, Tamil Nadu, India . MARG Limited was incorporated on 16 December 1994.

== Timeline ==
- 1995: May: MARG announced an IPO (Raised Rs. 12 million) and began trading on the Bombay Stock Exchange
- 2006: Obtained the Government of Puducherry's concession for the development of a modern port at Karaikal
- 2009: January: MARG launches Pushpadruma an apartment project at Kalavakkam on the Old Mahabalipuram Road in Chennai.
- 2009: May: Swarnabhoomi Academy of Music Envisioned by Prasanna Launched
- 2010: January: Karaikal Port flags off its first railway cargo
- 2010: February: MARG Puduvai Marathon in association with the Rotary Club of Pondicherry
- 2010: March: MoU signed with Virginia Tech, USA to set up Virginia Tech MARG Swarnabhoomi campus
- 2011: August: MARG Karaikal Port Launches Container Handling Services
- 2011: August: Marg Institute of Design & Architecture, Swarnabhoomi launched at MARG Swarnabhoomi
- 2011:November: Virgo Inaugurated at MARG Swarnabhoomi
- 2012: May: MARG signs MoU with Malaysian-based Limkokwing University of Creative Technology
- 2013: Feb: Bengal Feeder Line launches service between MARG Karaikal Port, Colombo, Hindu Business Line

== Real Estate Residential ==
=== MARG ProperTies ===
As of 2018, there have been several reported issues in the media related to MARG Properties. Many of these involve delays in handover of the MARG Brindavan project located near Oragadam area in Chennai. The project was launched with a great deal of sensationalism and with the slogan "Goodbye Landlady" and received a affirmative response with its media coverage. However, many of the buyers who had booked apartments with this project in late 2010 and in 2011 have reported no handover of these flats as of April 2018. This was also shot up with the arrest of the Chairman of MARG Group, G.R.K Reddy in November 2017 after a complaint was filed against him for cheating a buyer worth Rs. 25 lacs. The complainant had said that despite paying the money, MARG properties had not provided the apartment he has purchased.

Also in September 2017, MARG properties was one of the two builders penalized by Tamil Nadu Real Estate Regulatory Authority (TNRERA) for non-registration of projects before the deadline as proposed by the Authority.
