= Poovam, Kerala =

Poovam
- Village
- Location within Kerala
- Coordinates: 12°02′30″N 75°21′40″E
- Country: India
- State: Kerala
- District: Kannur
- Taluk: Taliparamba
- Highest elevation: 9 m (30 ft)
- Time zone: UTC+5:30 (IST)
- Pin code: 670142

Poovam is a small village in Taliparamba Block in Kannur district of Kerala State, India. It comes under Kurumathur Panchayat and is near the Panniyoor Pepper Research Station, and 30 km (19 mi) north of the district headquarters Kannur.

Taliparamba (8 km (5.0 mi)), Kurumathur (8.5 km (5.3 mi)), Naduvil (13.5 km (8.4 mi)), and Alakode(17 km (11 mi)) are the nearby towns.

There is another village with the same name in Changanassery taluk of Kottayam district, about 4.5 km from Changanassery.
