= Karaikal Airport =

Airport under construction in Karaikal, Puducherry, India

- IATA: none; ICAO: none

Summary
- Airport type: Privately owned for Public use
- Operator: Karaikal Airport Private Limited
- Location: Karaikal, Puducherry, India
- Coordinates: 10°58′43″N 79°47′53″E

Map
- Location of the airport in India

Runways
Direction	Length		Surface
Direction	ft	m	Surface
09/27	4,000	1,250

Karaikal Airport is a greenfield airport projected nearby the town of Karaikal, in the union territory of Puducherry, India. The District Administration of Karaikal had acquired around 300 acres of land in 2013 near Nedungadu and handed over to Coimbatore based Super Airport Infrastructure Private Limited to build the airport. By August 2019, since no progress had been made in executing the project and since the licence issued to the company had expired, the district administration decided to engage CIAL, the operators of Cochin International Airport to advise it on carrying the airport project forward.

== History ==
Karaikal was touted to become the first airport in the country to be built entirely with private capital. The Air Traffic Control, however, was to be operated by the Airports Authority of India (AAI). To date, the city relies on Tiruchirappalli International Airport – which serves the Cauvery delta region, including Karaikal – and on Madras International Airport, particularly for long-haul flights.

The greenfield project, proposed with 100% private ownership for public use, received in-principle clearance from the Ministry of Civil Aviation in February 2011. Construction work was scheduled to commence in May 2013. However, the project became dormant because the promoters could not raise the minimum of ₹ 100 crores required to begin construction of the runway. The airport project site, spread across 562 acres, was to be developed by Karaikal Airport Private Limited, a subsidiary of Coimbatore based Super Airport Infrastructure Private Limited (SAPL). The first phase of construction initially envisaged the construction of an 1,800-metre runway and a terminal building capable of handling 250 passengers during peak hours at an expense of ₹ 60 crore. The airport was expected to handle airliners like the Boeing 737. Citing delays in land acquisition, the company decided to build a shorter 1,250 metre long runway in the first phase, suitable for the operation of 30 seater aircraft The company had planned to expand the airport after five years, extending the runway to 2,600 metres and increasing terminal building capacity to 500 passengers per hour. A further expansion planned ten years down the line would envisage a 3,500-metre runway and a passenger capacity of 1,000 per hour. SAPL claimed that construction is would be completed before June 2018, but August 2019, since no progress had been made in executing the project and the licence issued to the company expired, the district administration decided to engage CIAL, the operators of Cochin International Airport to advise it on carrying the airport project forward.
