= Arasalar River =

River in India

Arsalar River
- Location within Tamil Nadu Location within India

Physical characteristics
- Mouth: Bay of Bengal
  - location: Karaikal, Puducherry, India
  - coordinates: 10.9114757°N 79.8514693°E
- Length: 24 kilometres (15 mi)

The Arasalar is a river flowing through the state of Tamil Nadu and the Union Territory of Puducherry. It is a distributary of the Kaveri River, branching off within the delta network of Thanjavur district. The river branches off from the Kaveri near Thiruvaiyaru in Thanjavur district. It is one of seven primary rivers that traverse the Karaikal district of Puducherry before discharging into the sea.

== River course ==
From its origin at Thiruvaiyaru, the river flows eastward past the city of Kumbakonam, covering a total course of approximately 24 km (15 miles). It flows for 11.2 km (7.0 miles) through Karaikal district before emptying into the Bay of Bengal east of Akalanganni. In Karaikal, the river forms a natural administrative boundary separating Neravy from Thirunallar to the northwest and Karaikal to the northeast. It also feeds several distributaries such as Nattar, Vanjiar and Nular.

== River pollution ==
Findings of Central Pollution Control Board (CPCB) in 2013 identified elevated concentrations of nitrate and chromium in the river, caused primarily by the discharge of untreated domestic sewage and industrial effluents. A Central Water Commission report also documented high dissolved arsenic levels, recording 13.33 μg/L at Porakudi.

== History and Culture ==
Until the 19th century, the Arasalar estuary at Karaikal functioned as a river port utilized by local Muslim seafaring merchants (Marakkayars). Their wooden vessels (Marakkalam) engaged in coastal and overseas trade. The port historically facilitated maritime trade connections with Southeast Asia, Ceylon, and West Asia. This is evidenced by the historical warehouse (HMTS Pandagasalai) and customs sites located 2 km (1.2 miles) inland along the river.

The river features in Kalki Krishnamurthy's historical fiction novel Ponniyin Selvan (1954), where its Chola era waterways and settlements are depicted.
