= Karaikal =

Karaikal Karikal
- Municipality
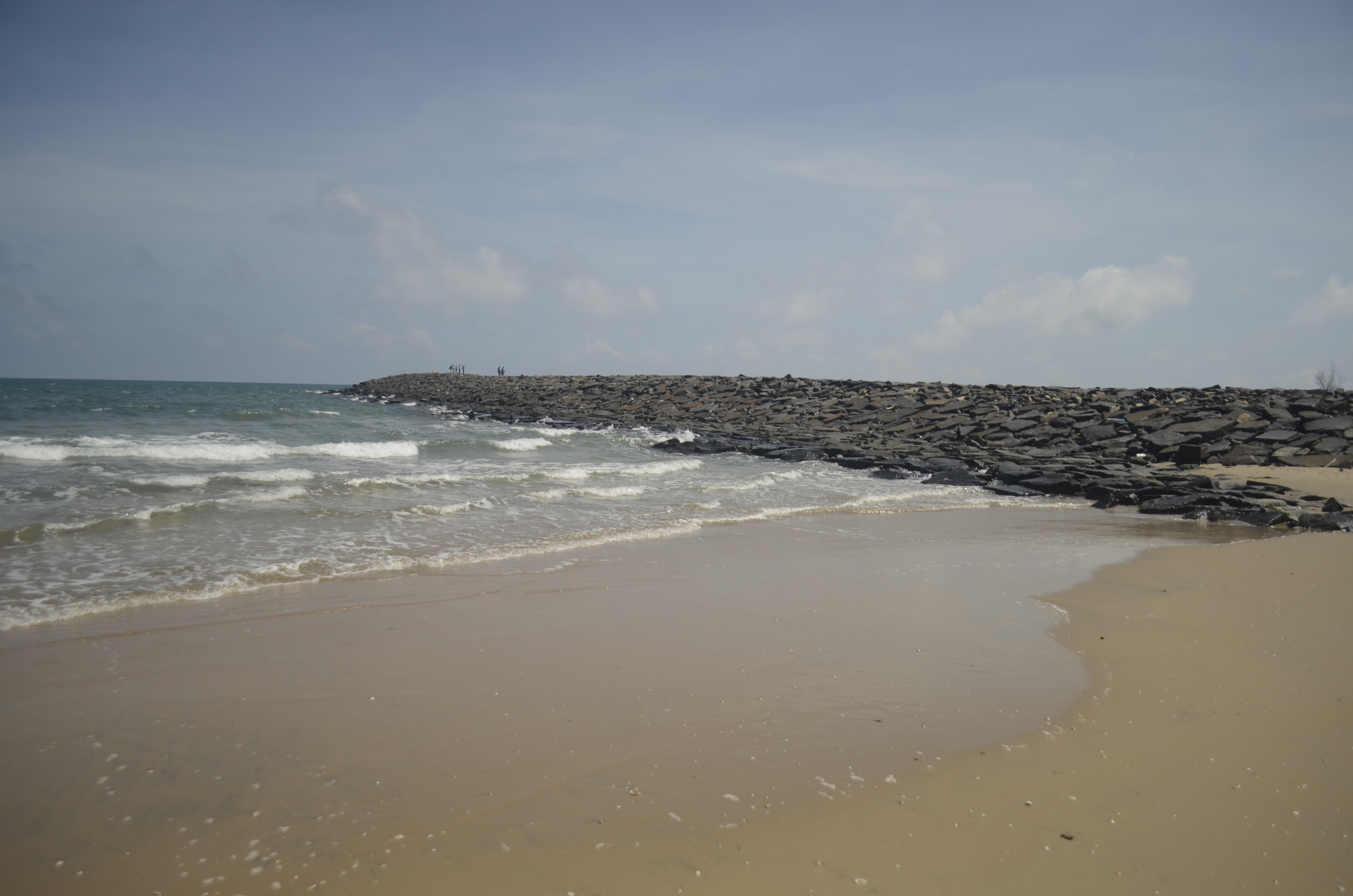
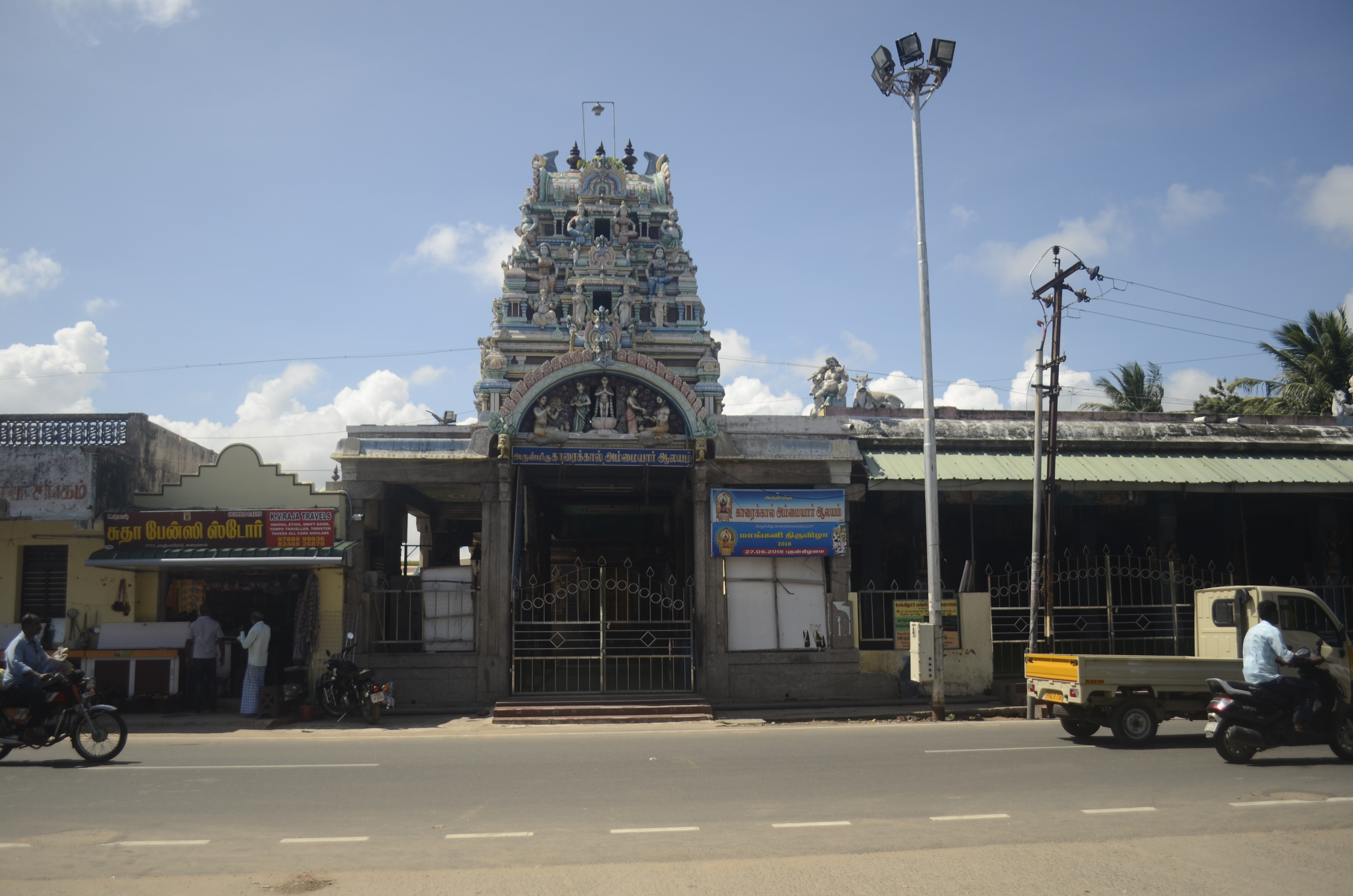
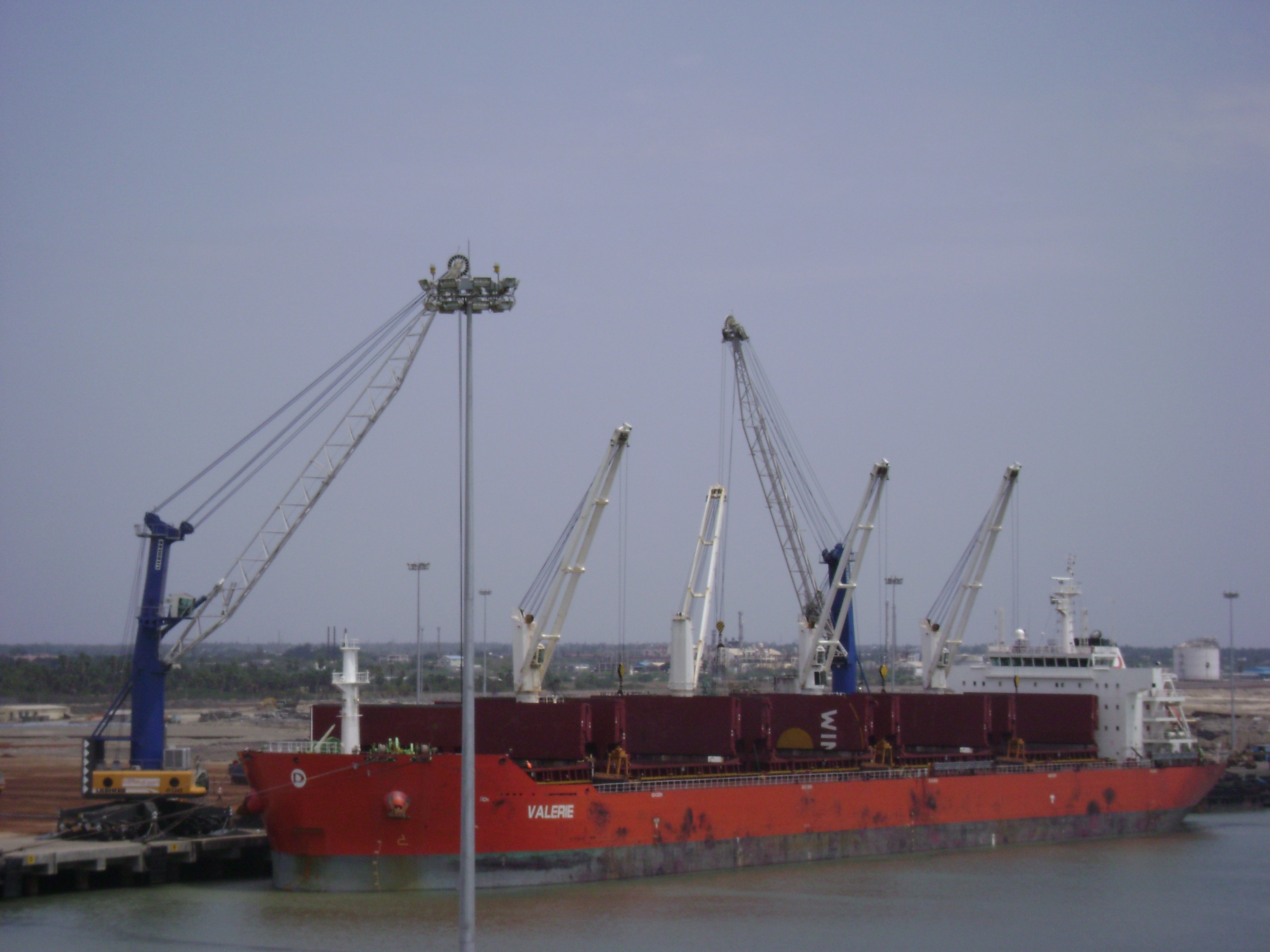
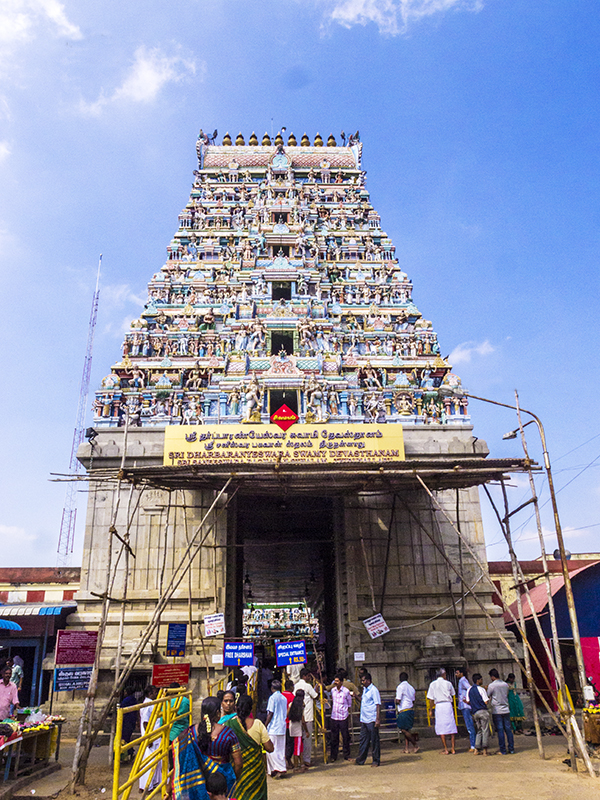
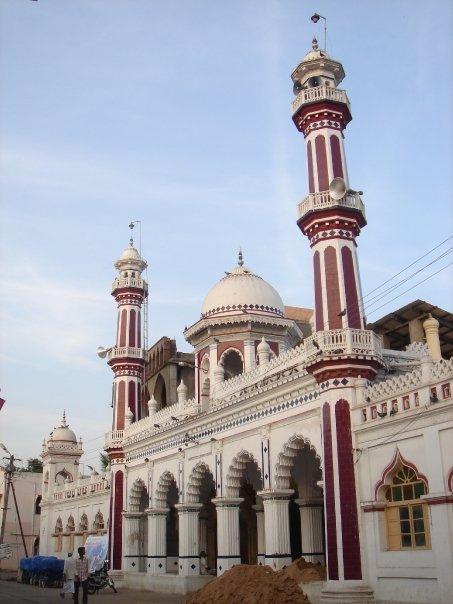
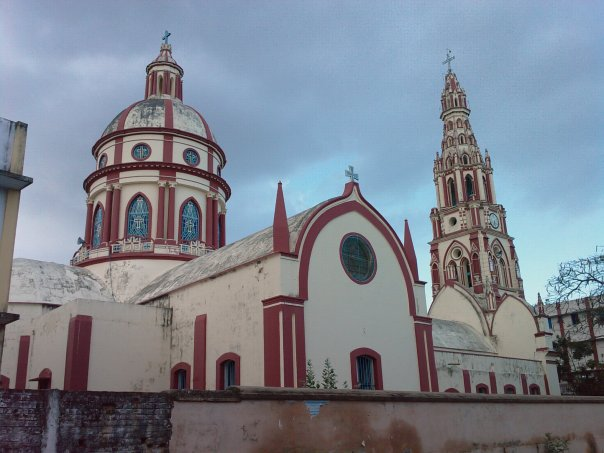
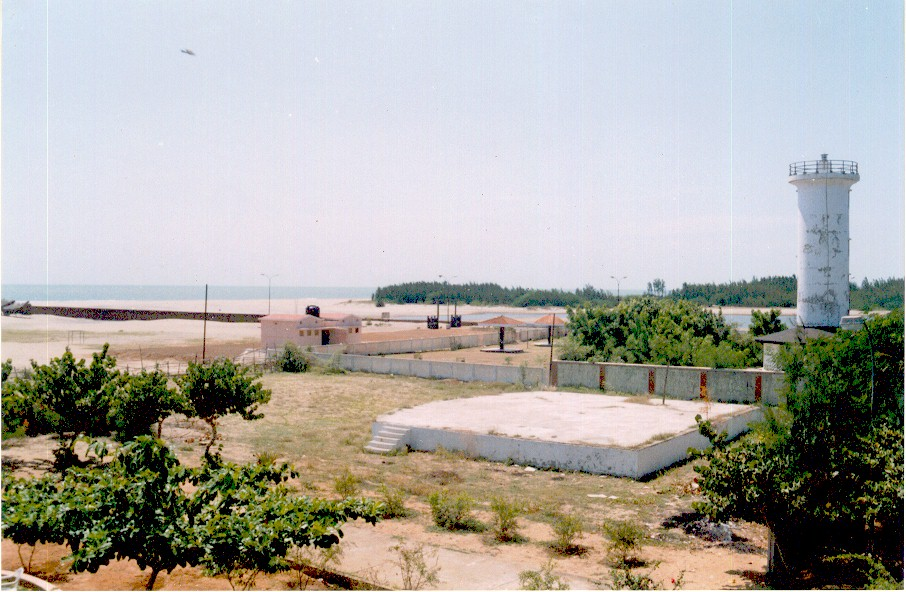
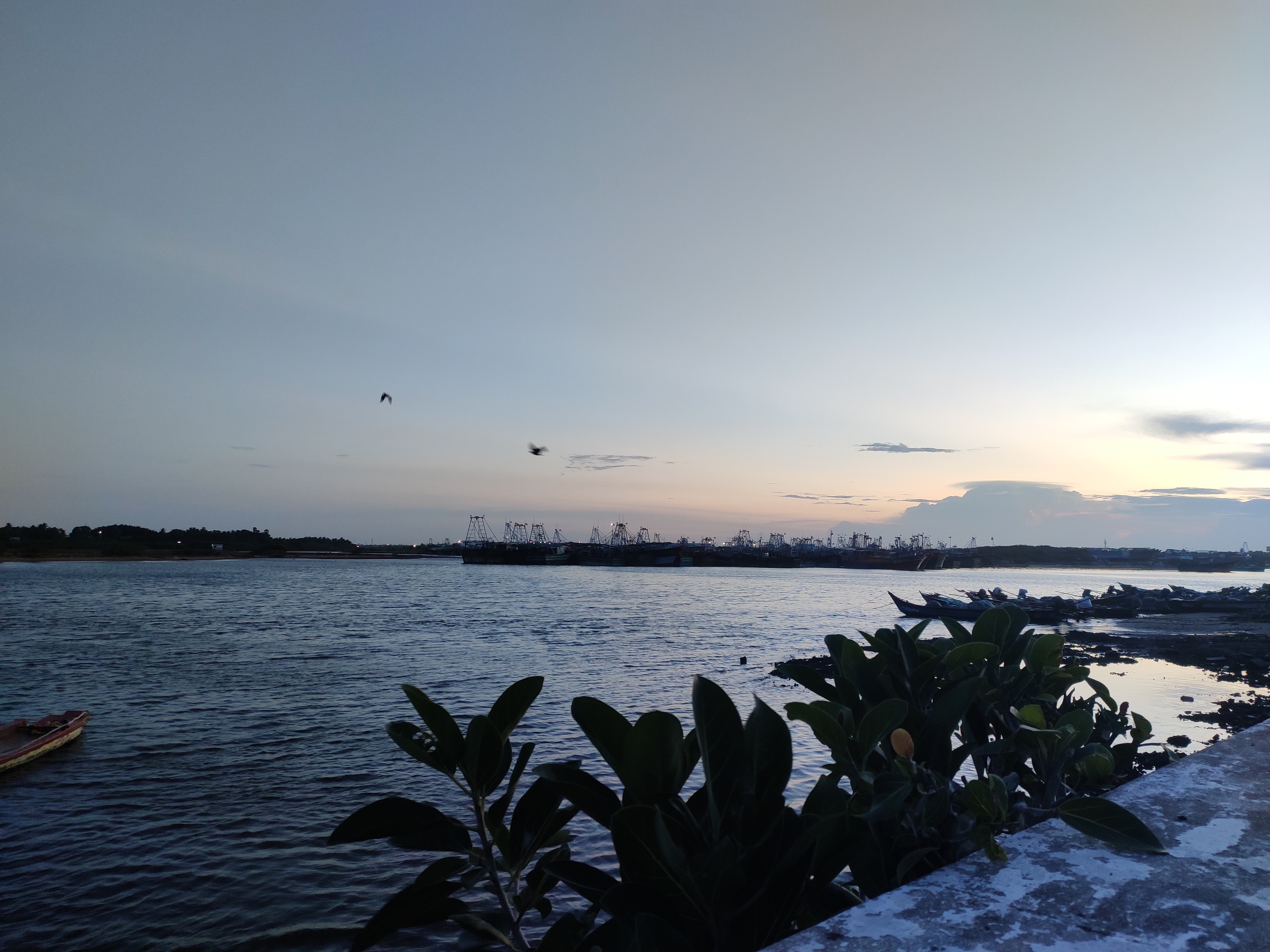
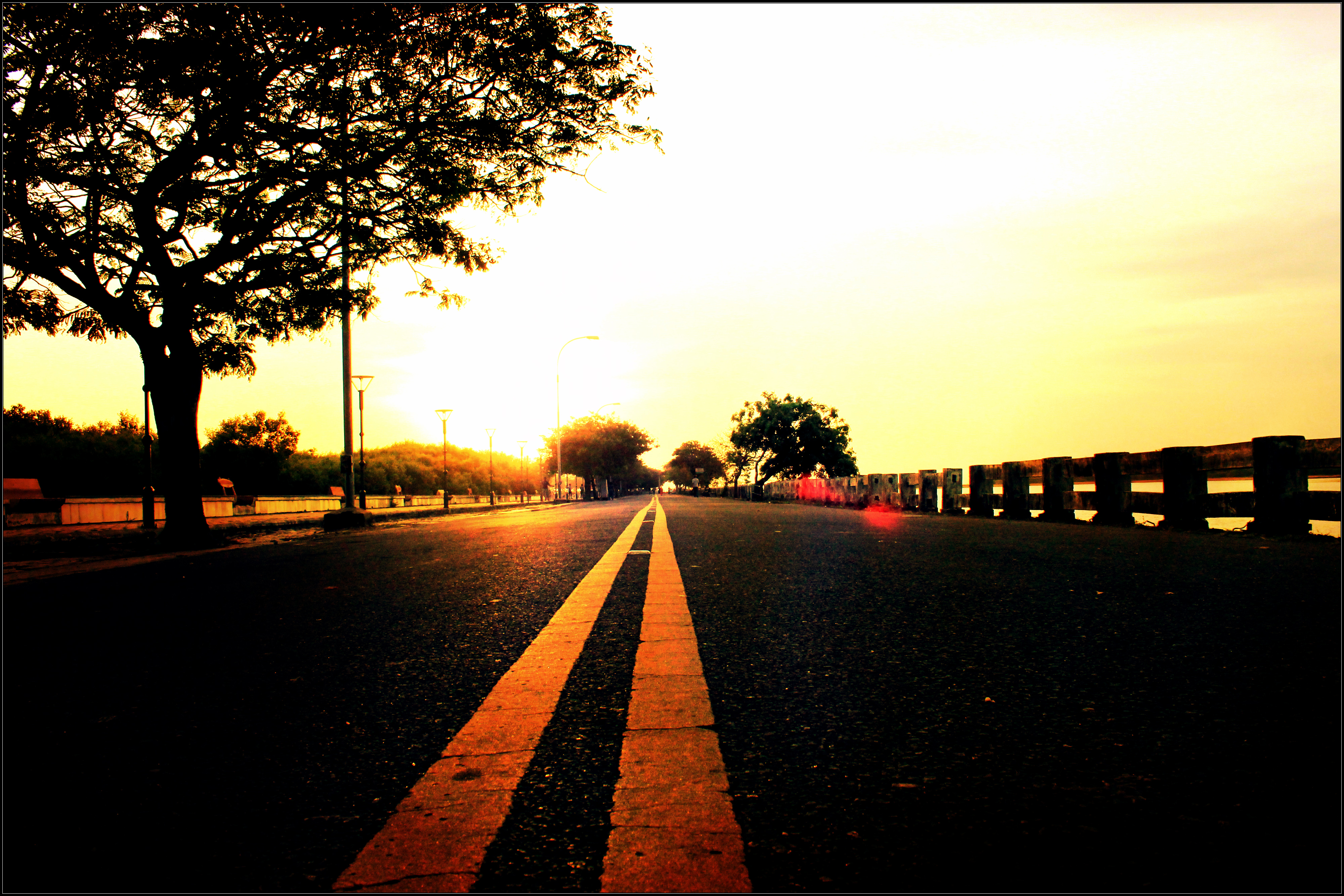
- Karaikal Beach Karaikal Ammaiyar Temple Karaikal Port Sri Dharbaranyeswarar Temple at Tirunallar Karaikal Grand Mosque Our Lady of Angels Church Karaikal Lighthouse Arasalar River Estuary Beach Road during Dawn

- Location of Karaikal in Tamil Nadu, India
- Coordinates: 10.932701°N 79.831853°E
- Country: India
- Union territory: Puducherry
- District: Karaikal
- Region: Tamil Nadu

Government
  - Type: Municipality
  - Body: Karaikal Municipality (Conseil Municipal de Karaikal)
- Elevation: 4 m (13 ft)

Population
  - Total: 200,222

Languages
  - Official: Tamil
  - Additional: English, French
- Time zone: UTC+5:30 (IST)
- PIN: 609601-609609
- Telephone code: +91-04368-
- Vehicle registration: PY 02
- Website: www.karaikal.gov.in

Karaikal (/ˈkɑːraɪkʌl/, Tamil: [kaːɾɐi̯kːaːl], French: Karikal [kaʁikal]) is a port city of the Indian Union Territory of Puducherry. It is the administrative headquarters of the Karaikal District and the second-largest city in the territory after its capital, Pondicherry. Located on the Coromandel Coast of Bay of Bengal in South India, it is situated at the center of a coastal enclave surrounded by the state of Tamil Nadu and its Cauvery delta districts (Mayiladuthurai, Tiruvarur and Nagapattinam).

== Etymology ==
The origin of the word Karaikal is uncertain. The Imperial Gazetteer of British India gives its meaning as 'fish pass'. Both the words 'Karai' and 'Kal' have several meanings, of which the more acceptable ones are 'lime mix' and 'canal' respectively. Hence it has been suggested that the name may mean a canal built of lime mix. However, no trace of such a canal is evident.

== History ==
In 1738, Karaikal was promised to the French by Sayaji, the exiled Rajah of Thanjavur, in exchange for their assistance. However, the transfer of control only occurred in 1739 with the help of Chanda Sahib of Arcot, when the French formally obtained the town.

In 1749, additional territories consisting of 81 villages were ceded by Pratap Singh to the French during their siege of Thanjavur, a grant that was confirmed by treaty in 1754. Karaikal changed hands multiple times in the following years due to conflicts between the French and the British, notably during the siege on 5th April 1760, when British forces captured the town after a ten-day defense, defeating then governor Pierre Renault.

Karaikal was eventually restored to French control in 1817 following the end of the Napoleonic Wars. The French continued to hold control, despite occasional interruptions by the British Raj, until 1954, when it was de facto incorporated into the Republic of India. Karaikal, along with the other French Indian colonies of Mahé, Yanaon, Chandernagor, and Pondichéry, was de jure integrated into India in 1962.

== Geography ==
Karaikal is a small coastal enclave which was formerly part of French India. Together with the other former French territories of Pondicherry, Yanam, and Mahé, it forms the Union Territory of Puducherry. Karaikal is bounded on three sides by three districts of Tamil Nadu, on the North by Mayiladuthurai district, on the South by Nagapattinam district of Tamil Nadu state, on the west by Tiruvarur district (also belonging to Tamil Nadu), and on the East by the Bay of Bengal. The enclave is located 140 kilometres (87 miles) south of the city of Pondicherry, 158 kilometres (98 miles) east of Trichy and is known for its rich cultural heritage.

The main branches of Kaveri below Grand Anicut are the Kudamurutti, Arasalar, Virasolanar and the Vikramanar. Although Arasalar and its branches spread through Karaikal, the waters of Kudamurutti and Virasolanar also meet the irrigation needs of the region.

Forming a part of the fertile Kaveri delta, the region is completely covered by the distributaries of Cauvery. Covered completely by a thick mantle of alluvium of variable thickness, the lie of the region is flat having a gentle slope towards the Bay of Bengal in the east. It is limited on the north by the Nandalar and on the south-east by the Vettar. The group of rocks known as Cuddalore formations is met with in the area contiguous to Karaikal region in Nagapattinam district.

=== Climate ===
Köppen-Geiger climate classification system classifies its climate as tropical wet and dry (As).

Climate data for Karaikal (1991–2020, extremes 1973–2020)
Month	Jan	Feb	Mar	Apr	May	Jun	Jul	Aug	Sep	Oct	Nov	Dec	Year
Record high °C (°F)	32.2 (90.0)	34.2 (93.6)	37.2 (99.0)	40.7 (105.3)	42.0 (107.6)	42.4 (108.3)	39.5 (103.1)	39.4 (102.9)	38.8 (101.8)	36.9 (98.4)	35.9 (96.6)	32.7 (90.9)	42.4 (108.3)
Mean daily maximum °C (°F)	29.0 (84.2)	30.4 (86.7)	32.2 (90.0)	34.2 (93.6)	36.3 (97.3)	36.6 (97.9)	36.0 (96.8)	35.1 (95.2)	34.2 (93.6)	32.1 (89.8)	29.8 (85.6)	28.8 (83.8)	32.9 (91.2)
Daily mean °C (°F)	25.9 (78.6)	26.8 (80.2)	28.6 (83.5)	30.6 (87.1)	30.9 (87.6)	31.4 (88.5)	31.4 (88.5)	30.2 (86.4)	29.8 (85.6)	28.8 (83.8)	27.0 (80.6)	26.2 (79.2)	29.0 (84.1)
Mean daily minimum °C (°F)	22.3 (72.1)	23.0 (73.4)	24.4 (75.9)	26.5 (79.7)	27.2 (81.0)	26.8 (80.2)	26.5 (79.7)	25.8 (78.4)	25.5 (77.9)	25.0 (77.0)	23.9 (75.0)	22.8 (73.0)	25.0 (77.0)
Record low °C (°F)	18.0 (64.4)	17.8 (64.0)	18.4 (65.1)	20.8 (69.4)	21.0 (69.8)	20.8 (69.4)	21.1 (70.0)	21.0 (69.8)	20.6 (69.1)	20.6 (69.1)	19.5 (67.1)	17.8 (64.0)	17.8 (64.0)
Average rainfall mm (inches)	37.4 (1.47)	24.6 (0.97)	19.6 (0.77)	23.6 (0.93)	59.3 (2.33)	57.8 (2.28)	37.0 (1.46)	84.5 (3.33)	109.5 (4.31)	260.7 (10.26)	493.4 (19.43)	260.6 (10.26)	1,467.9 (57.79)
Average rainy days	2.1	1.0	0.6	1.2	2.4	2.4	2.2	4.9	4.9	9.8	13.7	8.4	53.6
Average relative humidity (%) (at 17:30 IST)	75	72	71	73	71	65	65	70	75	78	82	79	73
Source 1: India Meteorological Department
Source 2: Tokyo Climate Center (mean temperatures 1991–2020)

== Governance ==
The District Collector is the official representative to the Lieutenant Governor and Chief Co-ordinator and Liaison Officer to all Government departments of Karaikal district. District Collectorate, Karaikal is the functional headquarters of Karaikal District.

Karaikal region is made up of Karaikal municipality and the Communes of

- Nedungadu
- Kottucherry
- Neravy
- Thirunallar
- Tirumalarajanpattinam
- Poovam
- Varichikudy

== Demographics ==
According to the 2011 Census of India, total population of Karaikal district is 200,222, comprising 97,809 males and 1,02,413 females. Population of the district accounts for 16.04% of the total population of Puducherry U.T. and ranks second among the districts. The literacy rate is 87.1%, with male literacy at 92.4% and female literacy at 82.0%.

== Culture ==
The Chandra Theertham, the city's eminent temple tank, is particularly highlighted during the Theppotsavam.

Karaikal is renowned for its connection with Karaikal Ammaiyar, a leading Shaivite saint and Bhakti poetess, amongst the sixty-three nayanmar, who lived there around the 5th century CE. A sanctuary, the Karaikal Ammaiyar temple, is dedicated to her, and popular for its annual celebration of Mangani (the Mango Festival or Fête des Mangues in French), which takes place in summer. The event is the town's main feast. Located on the former Rue de Poréar (now Bharathiyar Street), the Karikal Amméar temple is neighboured by the Shaivite temple of Kailasanathar and the Vaishnavite temple of Nithyakalyana Perumal. The three religious sites share the Chandra Theertham tank, which lies along the street. A second religious celebration in the town concerns exclusively the Kailasanathar temple, which organizes the Karaikal Chariot festival.

Karaikal is also sometimes associated with the temple partly devoted to Shani or Saneesvara at Thirunallar, one of the Navagraha Sthalam in the Kumbakonam region. The Dharbaranyesvarar temple of Thirunallar is as well one of the Sapta Vidanga Sthalam, an important network of Shaivite shrines in relation with the famed Thyagaraja temple of Thiruvarur. Three other significant Shaivite sanctuaries, among the Paadal Petra Sthalam, are also located nearby Karaikal. These are the Dharmapuram Yazhmoorinathar temple in Dharmapuram, between the communes of Karaikal and Thirunallar, the Tiruttelicheri Parvatheesvarar temple, in nowadays Kovil Pathu, on the outskirts of the town, and the Thiruvettakudi Sundaresvarar temple in Thiruvettakudi, a hamlet east to the village of Varichikudi.

Of lesser reverence with respect to the Paadal Petra Sthalam, Karaikal and its surroundings also feature temples esteemed in the Saiva Siddhanta tradition, designated as the Vaippu Sthalam. Mentioned in the religious literature associated with this tradition, there are two of these temples, the Raja Chozheesvarar temple at Thirumalairayanpattinam or T.R Patnam (once known as the Grande Aldée in French), and the Thirulokanathar temple at Thakkalur, a hamlet between Dharmapuram and Thirunallar.

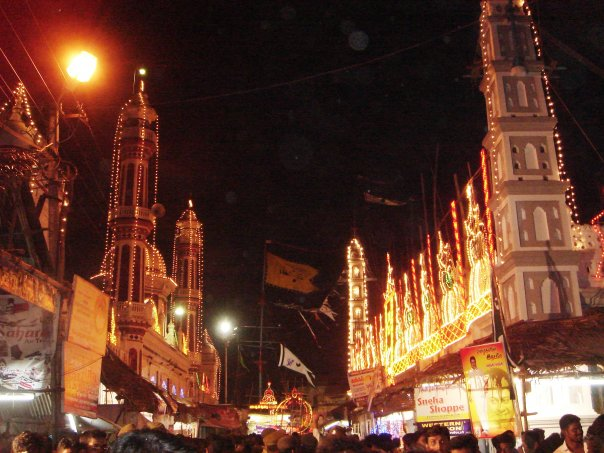
The Kanduri procession, conducted down the Great Mosque and Dargah street.

The Muslim presence in Karaikal grew between the 18th and 19th centuries. The town witnessed the establishment of a Bukharan Muslim Sufi cleric christened Mastan Saheb in the early 19th century. He attracted many Muslims to the town, and his fruitful preaching brought new believers. Following his demise in 1829, a dargah formed, and a commemorative procession (an urs), known locally as Kanduri (the Kanduri Festival or Candry in French), is held annually. Karaikal's Dargah is an architecturally remarkable building, reminiscent of the more famous Dargah at nearby Nagore, and demonstrative of the Islamic architectural style in use at the time in the Tanjore region, and more widely in the Deccan. The adjacent Grand Mosque is also a remarkable architectural structure, with a more pronounced Indo-Saracenic influence.

== Economy ==
Most of the people in town are office goers and industrial workers. There are a number of iron and steel rolling mills, spinning mills, tiles, polythene, rubber and chemical industries in Karaikal. Other common sources of the people's income come from business. The prominent source of income of this district is agriculture and fishing. Karaikal is a coastal town with a total coastline of 26 kilometres (16 miles). There are 12 big fishing hamlets and around more than 25,000 fishermen (6,000 families) are living in these coastal villages. Their main employment is fishing, exporting and fishing related activities. The other main source is the liquor business, the tax being less and the cost almost half when compared to the neighbouring state of Tamil Nadu. Karaikal is one of the towns in South India with high cost of living due to French NRI's presence. Thousands of families with their origin in Karaikal live in France. Puducherry Power Corporation Limited is Generating Electricity with Natural gas fuel in their combined cycle power plant and supply the electricity to Puducherry Electricity Department. The fuel gas received through GAIL India Limited by underground pipelines from ONGC Wells.The ONGC's office Kaveri rig is at Karaikal.

== Transport ==
=== Airways ===
The nearest airport to Karaikal is Tiruchirappalli International Airport, which serves the entire Cauvery delta region, as well as adjacent areas. The other major airport close to the town is Chennai International Airport, which offers better air connectivity, especially to long-haul destinations.

Karaikal Airport is a greenfield project nearby Karaikal, currently frozen. It would have been the first airport in the country built entirely with private capital. The project received in-principle clearance from the Ministry of Civil Aviation in February 2011. Karaikal Airport's Air Traffic Control, however, would have been operated by the Airports Authority of India (AAI). In its initial plans, the airport, spread across 562 acres (227 ha), was being developed by Karaikal Airport Private Limited, a subsidiary of Super Airport Private Limited. The first phase of construction would have included construction of a 1200-metre runway and a terminal building capable of handling 120 passengers during peak hours. The airport was expected to handle regional turboprop airliners like the ATR-42. The company planned to expand the airport after five years, extending the runway to 2,600 metres (8,500 feet) and increasing terminal building capacity to 500 passengers per hour. A further expansion was planned ten years down the line with a 3500-metre runway and a passenger capacity of 1,000 per hour.

=== Seaways ===
Karaikal port is a new deep sea water port being constructed in Karaikal. More than 600 acres (2.4 km^{2}) of land was leased out to MARG corporation in year 2005 for 30 years and can be renewed for every 10 years thereafter. The port will have a total of nine berths and is constructed for primary transport of coal, textile and cement. The Karaikal port is intended to primarily handle cement and coal to serve the hinterland in Ariyalur, Perambalur and Tiruchi districts. The port is also expected to provide an alternative to the Madras and Tuticorin ports, which are the major ports in the coastline but are separated by long distance. Further, Karaikal is in the middle of the Tamil Nadu coast, midway between the two deepwater ports of Chennai and Tuticorin.

=== Roadways ===
The National Highway NH 32 connects Chennai and Thoothukudi, passes through Karaikal. It is located at the distance 297 km (185 mi) from Chennai, 132 km (82 mi) from Puducherry, 154 km (96 mi) from Tiruchirapalli, 57 km (35 mi) from Kumbakonam and 20 km (12 mi) from Nagapattinam. Karaikal is connected with both National Highways and State Highways. Both Gov't. and Private buses available from Karaikal to Bangalore, Chennai, Coimbatore, Tiruchirapalli, Kumbakonam, Mayiladuthurai, Puducherry, Cuddalore, Chidambaram.

=== Railways ===
Karaikal having rail line connected from Tiruchirapalli via Thanjavur, Tiruvarur, Nagapattinam, and Nagore. Presently Rails are available from Karaikal to Bangalore, Mumbai, Chennai, Ernakulam, Tiruchirapalli, Tanjore, Tiruvarur, Nagapattinam, Nagore, Velanganni and currently Karaikal to Peralam Railway line work is under progress. Peralam–Karaikal line

== Education ==
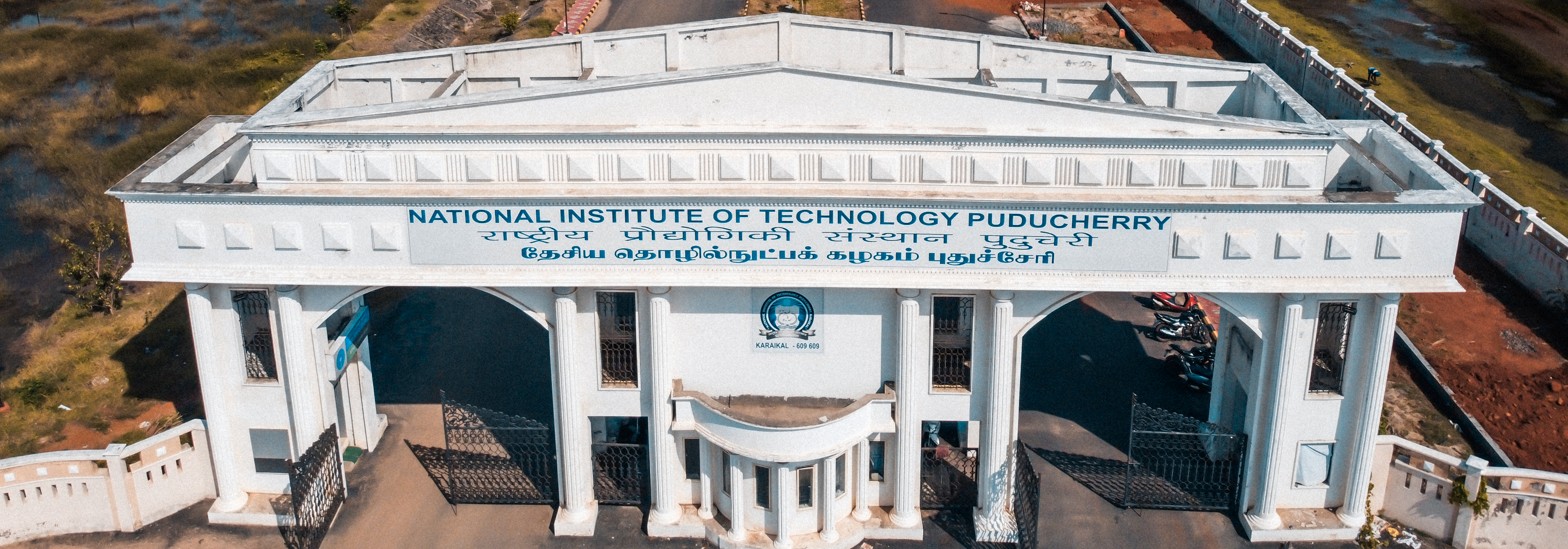
NIT Puducherry

According to the 2011 Census, Karaikal has literacy rate of 87.1%. There is a wide network of educational institutions right from elementary level to collegiate level in the Karaikal region.

Jawaharlal Institute of Postgraduate Medical Education and Research (JIPMER) was established in Karaikal in 2016 with an initial intake of 50 students. The students are selected through entrance exams conducted nationwide.

Vinayaka Mission’s Medical College & Hospital, Karaikal is a private medical college under VMRF-DU with a 590-bed teaching hospital in Karaikal, Puducherry. Parent university VMRF-DU holds NAAC ‘A’ accreditation. In NIRF 2024, VMRF-DU is in the 151–200 band among universities (and 89th in Pharmacy). Highlights: 150 MBBS seats in NMC’s 2024–25 matrix; hospital is NABH Entry-Level (PEH-2019-0707) and the central lab is NABL-accredited (ISO 15189).

National Institute of Technology Puducherry was established in Karaikal in 2010. The students are admitted based on Joint Entrance Examination – Main entrance exam score.

== Notable people ==
- Peter Hein
- A.M.H. Nazeem
- Padma Shri K. N. Dandayudhapani Pillai
- M. O. H. F. Shahjahan
- K. A. Thangavelu

== See also ==
- French India
- French colonial empire
- French East India Company
- Municipal Administration in French India
- Karaikal Carnival
- Serumavilangai
