= Karaikal Port =

Private port in Karaikal, Puducherry, India

Coordinates: 10.838°N 79.846°E

Karaikal Port Private Limited
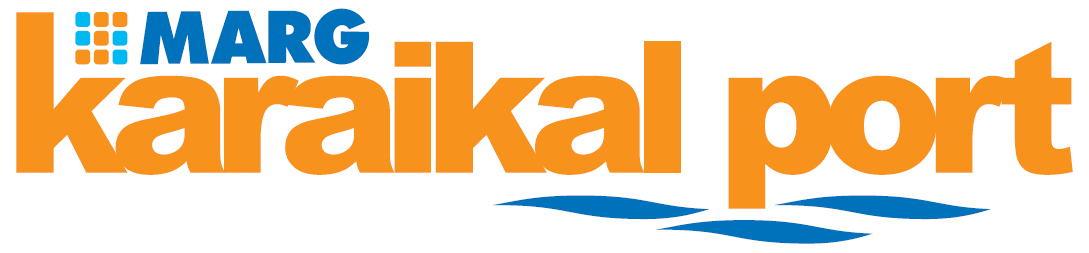

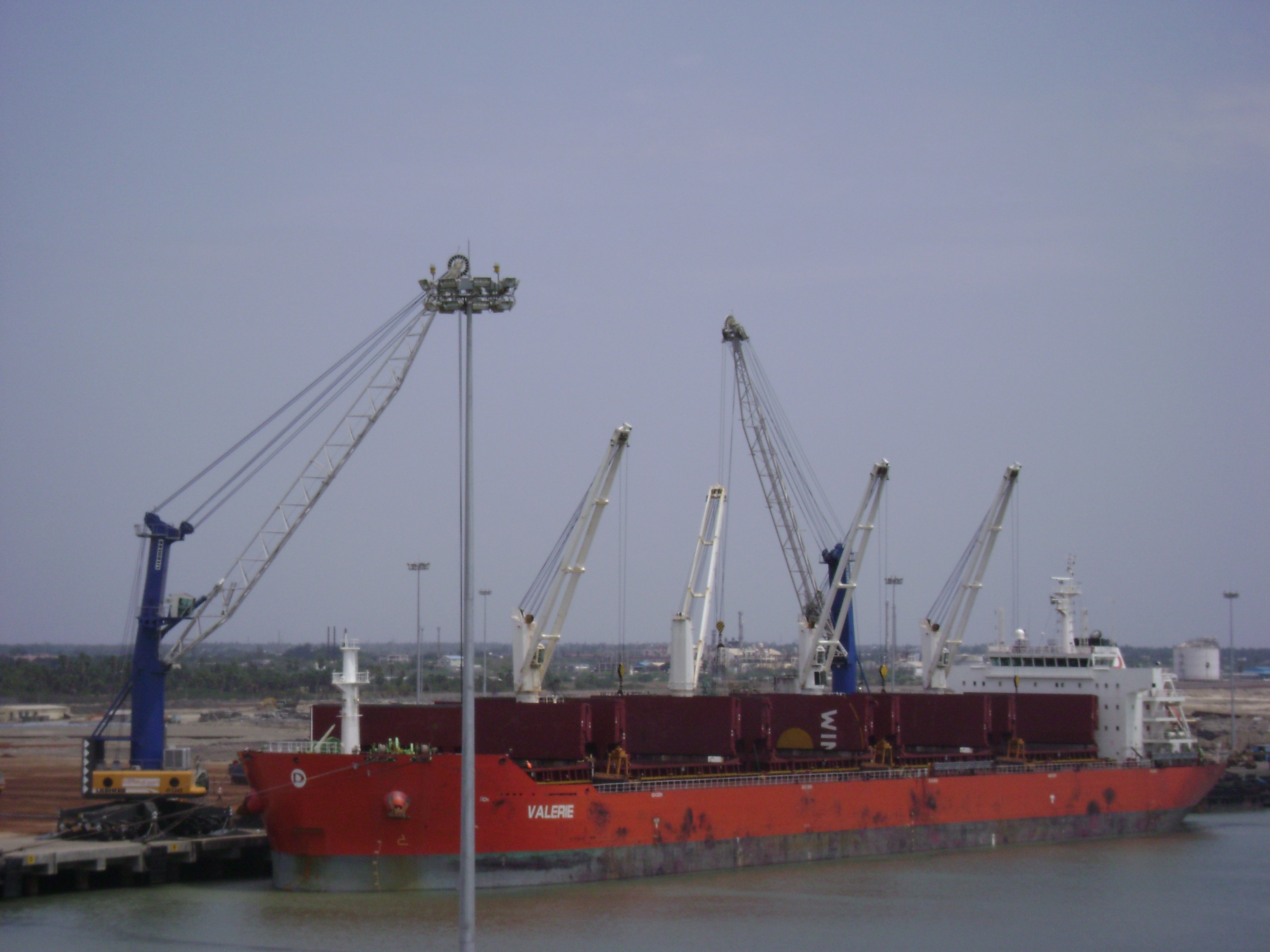
- Type: Private
- Industry: Marine
- Founded: 2009; 17 years ago
- Headquarters: Karaikal Port Private Limited, Khezhavanjoor Village, T.R.Pattinam, Karaikal – 609602, India
- Key people: Gautam Adani
- Owner: APSEZ (2023–present)
- Website: www.karaikalport.com

Karaikal Port Private Limited (KPPL; French: Port de Karaikal SARL) a private port developed by the Chennai based MARG Limited, became operational in April, 2009. It is located on the Eastern coast of India in Karaikal around 300 km south of Chennai Port and around 360 km north of Tuticorin Port.

On April 1, 2023, Adani Ports & SEZ (APSEZ) completed the acquisition of Karaikal Port.

== Overview ==
Karaikal Port project began with a Letter of Interest issued by Govt. of Pondicherry for development of a port at Karaikal in September 2005. MARG Ltd. signed the concession agreement in 2006 and work began in February, 2007. Phase 1 was envisaged to be operational in Aug 2009.

Karaikal Port became operational in April 2009 when it received its first vessel. Phase 1 comprises 2 Panamax size berths capable of handling 5.2 million MT of cargo per annum. The port has received over 1655 vessels since Commercial Operations and has handled over 55 million MT of various cargo.

KPPL has partners in Ocean Sparkle (marine operations) and PSTS (Stevedoring). Cargo evacuation is assisted by MARG Logistics, a sister concern of KPPL.

The shoreline of the port is between 10° 50’ 56’’ N and 10° 49’ 44’’ N.

== Timeline ==
- Sep 2005 - LOI Issued by GOP for Port Development at Karaikal
- Jan 2006 - Concession Agreement Signed
- May 2006 - Received MOEF Clearance for Phase 1
- Nov 2006 - Financial Closure for Phase 1 Achieved
- Feb 2007 - Final Tranche of Land Received
- Feb 2007 - Development for Phase 1 Commenced
- Mar 2009 - Phase 1 completed
- Apr 2009 – Karaikal Port Receives first Vessel

As MARG Infrastructures defaulted on the repayment of loans obtained by a consortium of banks headed by Indian Bank, the port left from the hands of the company and the pledged shares of the managing directors were transferred to the lead bank. In addition to the consortium of banks having a controlling stock in KPPL, its promoter, Marg Ltd., owned 45% of the share control of the port administrator.

In 2015, Edelweiss Asset Reconstruction Company took over 97% of the port’s ₹1,800 crore bank debt, turned around operations, brought in management changes and started setting up an LNG terminal. Edelweiss also converted part of its debt exposure to equity and now holds 11% stake in the company.

In May 2021, Adani Ports and Special Economic Zone Limited is looking to buy Karaikal port in Puducherry at a valuation of ₹1,500-2,000 crore but multiple sources said that the deal is “not easy” to consummate given the ownership structure and the debt. In April 2023, APSEZ acquired the port.

== Current status ==
So far the port has handled cargoes such as Coal, Pet coke, Raw sugar, Fertilizer, Cement, Project Cargo and construction materials. Containers and liquid cargo are soon to follow. On completion, the port will be capable of handling all types of cargo. Karaikal Port is also a hub for oil exploration activities and OSV/PSVs belonging to companies such a Hindustan Oil Exploration Company (HOEC)and Reliance Petroleum regularly call at the port.

Karaikal Port is a deep draft, all weather port. The current depth of 14.5 m allows for handling of Gearless Panamax size vessels (up to 800000 MT). The final depth of 41.5 m will allow cape size vessels (up to 120000 MT) to call at the port. The lagoon type basin protected by breakwaters allows operations all around the year.

Karaikal Port received its first Gearless Panamax vessel in November, 2009 and became the first Commercial port on Tamil Nadu coast to do so. The port also has the distinction of being the only private port to export cargo belonging to power equipment major Bharat Heavy Electricals Ltd (BHEL), which is a government agency.

The port obtained rail connectivity in January 2010 and its 3 railway sidings are connected to Trichy via Nagore. Karaikal Port regularly dispatches 4–5 rakes of coal as well as fertilizer every day.
