= Neravy =

Neravy Nérevy
- Town
- Location in India
- Coordinates: 10.8926°N 79.8157°E
- Country: India
- State: Puducherry
- District: Karaikal

Population
  - Total: 10,890

Languages
  - Official: Tamil
  - Additional: English, French
- Time zone: UTC+5:30 (IST)
- Postal code: 609604

Neravy, or Neravi, is a town and commune in the Karaikal District of Puducherry, India.

The village lies 145 km south of Puducherry in the Puducherry district, and is located between Karaikal and Nagapattinam. It is made up of two detached areas separated by Nannilam taluk of the Tiruvarur district, next to the Thirunallar commune, with the easterly flow of the Arasalar River forming the commune boundary.

Three small isolated enclaves of Tiruvarur district are embedded within the detached enclave of the Neravy commune.

== Demographics ==
The total population of the Neravy commune according to the 2001 census is 10890. Of this, zero citizens are scheduled tribes (STs) and 2637 are scheduled caste (SC). The gender ratio of the population in Neravy is 1020 females per 1000 males. The literacy rate in the city is 81.19 per cent, 89.42 for males and 73.21 for females.

== Gallery ==
A government school	ONGC public school
	Karaikal Beach
