= Tirumalairayanpattinam =

Coordinates: 10°52′04″N 79°49′42″E

Tirumalairayanpattinam TR Pattinam
- Census town
- Nickname: TRP
- Interactive map of Tirumalairayanpattinam

Population (2011)
  - Total: 18,862 with 9,289 men and 9,573 women

Languages
  - Official: Tamil
  - Additional: English, French
- Time zone: IST
- Pincode(s): 609 606
- Area code: +91-4368
- Vehicle registration: PY-02

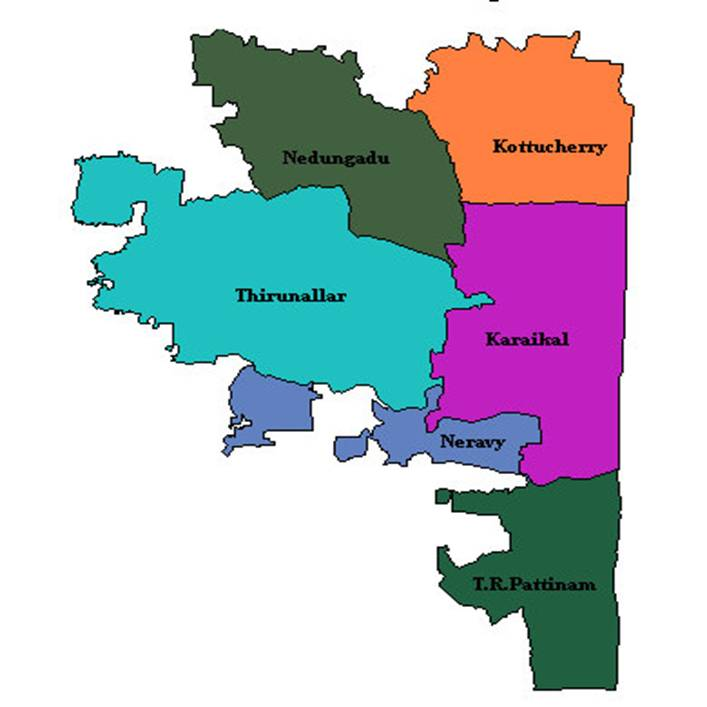
Tirumalairayan Pattinam from Karaikal District

Tirumalairayanpattinam is a census town and commune in the Karaikal District of Puducherry, India. Tirumalairayanpattinam is situated at a distance of 6 kilometres to the south of Karaikal municipality.

== Etymology ==
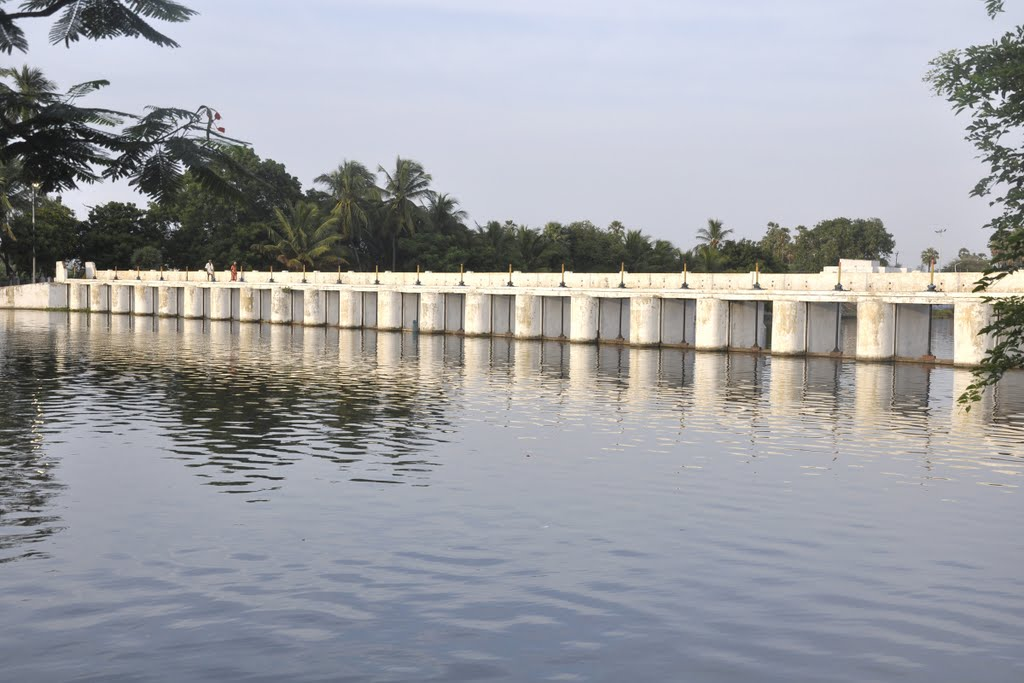
Thirumalairayanpattinam River Shutters

Thirumalairayanpattinam belongs to Karaikal District in Puducherry. This town is believed to be named after the king who ruled TR Pattinam during ancient days and also the river named out of that king name Tirumalarajanar River which drains into the Bay of Bengal a few kilometres north of the town.

== Demography ==
According to the 2001 census, Thirumalarajanpattinam had a population of 18,862 with 9,289 men and 9,573 women. The sex ratio was 1.031:1.

== Masi Magam ==
This annual festival takes place on the full moon day of the Tamil month of Masi (Between February and March). Deities from as many temples in and around Karaikal are brought in ceremonial processions to the seashore for a symbolic immersion ceremony. Thousands of people go to the seashore to have a dip in the sea which is said to wash away one's sins. The most important deity, which takes part in the festival, is Sowriraja Perumal of Thirukannapuram village in Tamil Nadu area. The saying goes that Sowriraja Perumal married a fishermen community woman and hence the moment the deity enters Tirumalairayan-pattinam village of Tirumalairayanpattinam commune for the festival, the fishermen take charge of the deity and charges are replaced after the festival is completed i.e. after the holy bath. This festival is held with all pomp and glory although it cannot be compared to the degree of celebration in Pondicherry.

== Educational institutions ==
Govt. Schools

- Govt. Middle School, Senior theru, T.R. Pattinam
- Govt. Primary School, Abirami East St., T.R. Pattinam
- Govt. Higher Secondary School, T.R. Pattinam
- Govt. Girls High School, T.R. Pattinam
- Govt. Middle School, T.R. Pattinam
- Govt. Primary School, Melaiyur Junction, T.R. Pattinam
- Govt. Men ITI, T.R. Pattinam
- Govt. Women ITI, T.R. Pattinam
- Govt. Primary School, Garudapalayam, T.R. Pattinam
- Govt. Primary School, Vadakattali, T.R. Pattinam
- Govt. Primary School, Pattinacherry, T.R. Pattinam
- Govt. primary School, Mariamman Koil Pet, T.R. Pattinam
- Govt. Primary School, North Vanjore, T.R. Pattinam
- Govt. Primary School, Polagam, T.R. Pattinam
- Govt. Middle School, Ellaiamman Koil St., T.R. Pattinam

PRIVATE SCHOOLS

- Immaculate English High School, Eda theru, T.R. Pattinam
- Vinith Primary School, Peria Maricar St., T.R. Pattinam
- Bright Future Primary School, Pandagasalai St., T.R. Pattinam
- Vengadeswar School, Gandhi Salai, T.R. Pattinam
- Abirami Play School, Nagavarna Pillaiyar Koil St., T.R. Pattinam
- New Star, Big Street, T.R. Pattinam
- sri arobindo primary school, T.R. Pattinam

== Economy ==
T.R pattinam is located in the industrial zone. List of company

- Puducherry Power Corporation Limited
- ONGC Cauvery Asset
- Gas Authority of India Limited
- Karaikal Port
- Kothari Sugars & Chemicals Ltd., Karaikal
- Kothari Petro Chemical Ltd., Nagore Salai, Karaikal
- Chemplast Sanmar Pvt Ltd., Polagam, Karaikal
- Elango Steel Ltd., Polagam, Karaikal
- Kannappan Steel Ltd., Nagore Salai Vanjure, Karaikal
- Rengaraj Steel Ltd., Nagore Salai Vanjure, Karaikal
- MMS Steel Ltd., Nagore Salai Vanjure, Karaikal
- Motorola Steel Ltd., Nagore Salai Vanjure, Karaikal
- PSP Steel Ltd., Keezhavanjure, Karaikal
- Padma Balaji Steel Ltd., Keezhavanjure, Karaikal
- Midas Rubberf Ltd., Nagore Salai Vanjure, Karaikal
- Kiran Pondy Chemicals Ltd., Nagore Salai Vanjure, Karaikal
- Praveen Chemicals Ltd., (Power Soap), Keezhavanjure, Karaikal
- Vani Soap Company, Nagore Salai Vanjure, Karaikal
- Vasantha Carnite Ltd., Nagore Salai Vanjure, Karaikal
- AVM Battery Ltd., Mudalimedu, Polagam Karaikal
- Mahalakshmi Garments, Nagore Salai Vanjure, Karaikal
- VPS Polythine Ltd., Keezhavanjure. Karaikal
- Lakshmi Polythine Ltd., Medalimedu, Karaikal
- Jothi Chloride Ltd., Polagam, Karaikal
- Commando Soap Company, Polagam, Karaikal
- Raja Oil Mill, Nagore Salai Vanjure, Karaikal
- Varahini chems salai, kKaraikal
- Hotel Buhari, Gandhi main road, Nearvy

== Railway station ==
Tirumalairayanpattinam railway station address: Tirumalairayan Pattinam, Puducherry 609606, India

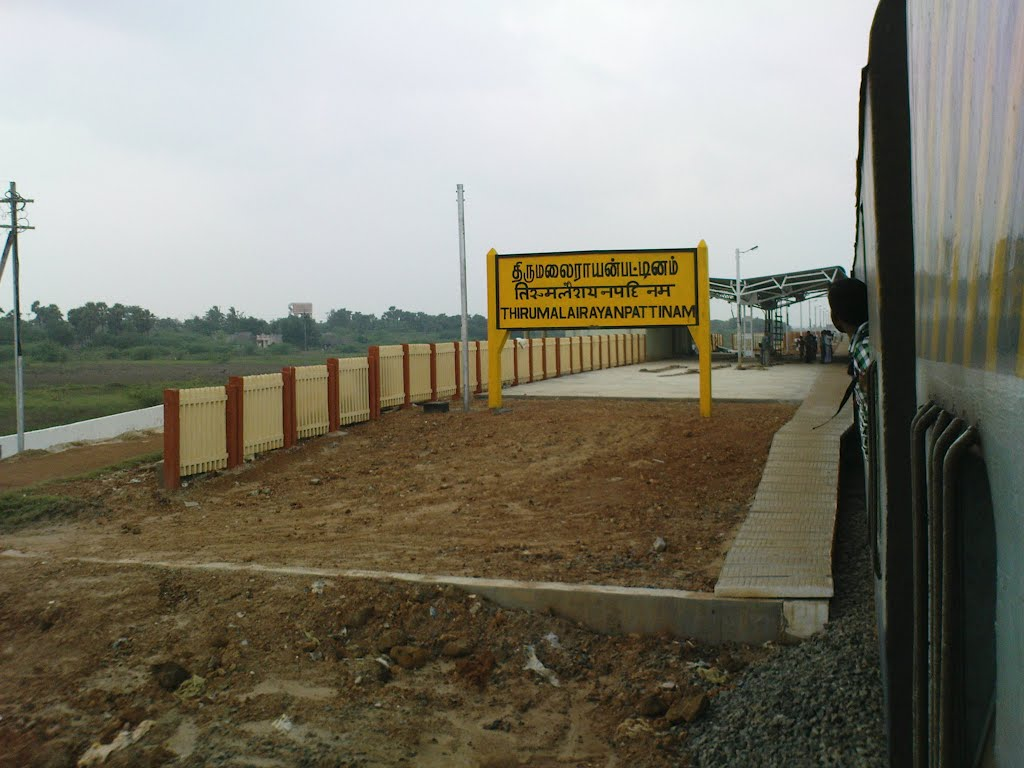
Thirumalairayanpattinam Railway Station

== See also ==
- Neravy T R Pattinam (Union Territory Assembly constituency)

Current and past MLAs from Neravy Tr Pattinam Assembly Constituency

| YEAR | NAME | PARTY |
|---|---|---|
| 2021 | M.Nagathiyagarajan | DMK |
| 2016 | Geetha Anandan | DMK |
| 2011 | V.M.C. Sivakumar | IND |
| 2006 | V.M.C. Sivakumar | DMK |
| 2001 | V.M.C. Sivakumar | DMK |
| 1996 | V.M.C. Sivakumar | DMK |
| 1991 | V. M. C. V. Ganapathy | ADMK |
| 1990 | V. Ganapathy | ADMK |
| 1985 | V.M.C. Varada Pillai | ADMK |
| 1980 | V. M. C. Sivakumar | DMK |
| 1977 | V.M.C. Varadhapillai | JNP |
| 1974 | V. M. C. Varadapillai | ADMK |
