= Karaikal district =

- District

- Location of Puducherry's Karaikal district within Tamil Nadu Location of Karaikal district in India
- Coordinates: 11°01′00″N 79°52′00″E
- Country: India
- Union Territory: Puducherry
- District: Karaikal

Area
  - Total: 161 km^{2} (62 sq mi)

Population (2011)
  - Total: 200,222
  - Density: 1,240/km^{2} (3,220/sq mi)

Languages
  - Official: Tamil
  - Additional: English, French,
- Time zone: UTC+5:30 (IST)
- PIN: 609 602
- Telephone code: 91 (0)4368
- Vehicle registration: PY-02
- Website: karaikal.gov.in

Karaikal district (French: District de Karikal; /ˈkɑːraɪkʌl/, Tamil: [kaːɾɐi̯kːaːl], French: Karikal [kaʁikal]) is one of the four districts of the Union Territory of Puducherry in India. The district headquarters is Karaikal.

== Geography ==
Karaikal district occupies an area of 160 square kilometres (62 sq mi).

Karaikal is a small coastal enclave of territory which was formerly part of French India. Together with the other former French enclaves of Pondicherry, Yanam, and Mahé, Karaikal forms the Union Territory of Puducherry. Karaikal is bounded on the North by Mayiladuthurai district, on the South by Nagapattinam district, on the west by Tiruvarur district, all three belonging to the state of Tamil Nadu, and on the East by the Bay of Bengal.

== Demographics ==
According to the 2011 census Karaikal district has a population of 200,222, roughly equal to the nation of Samoa. This gives it a ranking of 589th in India (out of a total of 640). The district has a population density of 1,252 inhabitants per square kilometre (3,240/sq mi) . Its population growth rate over the decade 2001-2011 was 17.29%. Karaikal has a sex ratio of 1048 females for every 1000 males, and a literacy rate of 87.83%.

Tamil is the principal language spoken and Tamils are the predominant linguistic group in the district.

Hindus formed the majority of the population at 83.41% of the population followed by Christians at 10.70%, Muslims at 6.46% and others at 0.12%.

== Transportation ==
Air

The nearest airport is in Trichy (Tiruchirappalli). Karaikal Airport is a greenfield airport under construction. It will be the first airport in the country to be built entirely with private capital.

Train

Karaikal railway station is a railway terminus, situated in the town of Karaikal in the Union Territory of Puducherry, India.

Port

Karaikal Port Private Limited (KPPL), a private port developed by the Chennai-based MARG Limited, became operational in April 2009. The port is located on the Eastern coast of India at keezhavanjore village in Karaikal District of Puducherry, around 300 km along the coast south of Chennai Port and around 360 km along the coast north of Tuticorin Port. The shoreline of the port is between 10° 50′ 56″ N and 10° 49′ 44″ N.

== See also ==
- French colonial empire
- French Indies Company
- French India
