= Adavipolam =

Village in India

Coordinates: 16.724331°N 82.278473°E

Adavipolam is a revenue village in the Yanam district of Puducherry, India.
