= Official languages of Puducherry =

Official language of Puducherry

The official standing of languages in Puducherry is governed by the 1963 assembly resolution to continue French as the official language and the subsequent Pondicherry Official Language Act, 1965 which states under the heading "Official language of the Union territory" that Tamil is the language to be used for all or any official purposes in the Union Territory, while Malayalam and Telugu may be used in Mahé and Yanam respectively. The Act also stipulates that English may be used for any of the official purposes of the Union territory.

An official mention in Rajya Sabha Parliamentary debates during 2006 confirmed that the five official languages of Puducherry are Tamil, English, Malayalam, Telugu, and French.

== 1956 Treaty of Cession ==
French was the official language of Puducherry under the Treaty of Cession 1956. French was also the official language of the Établissements français dans l'Inde (French India) and it remained as de jure official language of Pondicherry U.T by the Article XXVIII of Traité de Cession which states that,

- Le français restera langue officielle des Établissements aussi longtemps que les répresentants élus de la population n'auront pas pris une décision différente (The French language shall remain the official language of the Establishments so long as the elected representatives of the people shall not decide otherwise).

While the Official Gazette of Puducherry has a trilingual heading (in English, Tamil and French), it is published exclusively in English.

== 1963 Resolution by Representative Assembly ==
The de jure transfer of French establishments in India was on 16 August 1962. Then Second Pondicherry Representative Assembly had passed resolution by vote in May 1963 to express its desire to continue the official status of the French language. However, the same resolution expressed its want of the maternal languages spoken in the union territory to be considered along with Hindi and English as associative languages to French for all official and practical purposes.

== Union Territories Act, 1963 ==
For laying down the rules and regulations related to the union territories of India the act was passed in 1963. This act once again reconfirmed the assembly resolution that French shall continue to be used as an official language in Puduchuerry unless its legislative assembly does not decide otherwise.

== Pondicherry Official Language Act, 1965 ==
Considering the 1963 assembly resolution and 1963 act, the new additional official languages were recognized by The Pondicherry Official Language Act, 1965 (Act No. 3 of 1965). This act established that "the Tamil language shall [...] be the language to be used for all or any of the official purposes of the Union Territory. It states that Provided that the Administrator may by like Notification, direct that in the case of Mahe area, the Malayalam language, and in the case of Yanam area, the Telugu language may be used for such official purposes and subject to such conditions as may be specified in such notification". Finally, it states that "Notwithstanding anything contained in section 3, and from the commencement of this Act, the English language may be used for all or any of the official purposes of the Union Territory".

During the early twentieth century, Tamil gained equal status alongside the existing French language. After the merger with India, Telugu and Malayalam also obtained the same status although with some restrictions. Though the status of each languages varies with respect to each district, when communicating in between districts of different languages, generally English is used for convenience. The three official languages are:

1. Tamil: Language used by the union territory government, especially used when communicating within and between the Tamil majority districts of (Pondicherry and Karaikal) along with issuing official decrees.
2. Telugu: Used when communicating within Telugu district Yanam.
3. Malayalam: Used when communicating within Malayalam district Mahé.

== Demographics ==
In 2011, the number of people speaking in each official languages was:

- Tamil: 1,100,976 (In the Pondicherry and Karikal districts)
- Telugu: 74,347 (In the Yanam district)
- Malayalam: 47,973 (In the Mahe district)
- French: Likely around 300

== See also ==
- Puducherry Legislative Assembly
- Government of Puducherry
