= Mettacur =

Mettacur is a revenue village in the Yanam District of Puducherry, India.
