= Francetippa =

Coordinates: 16.728°N 82.215°E

Francetippa is a revenue village in the Yanam District of Puducherry, India.
