= Thirukoteeswarar Temple =

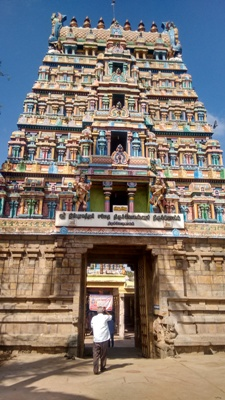

- Location in Tamil Nadu

Religion
- Affiliation: Hinduism
- District: Thanjavur
- Deity: Thirukoteeswarar (Shiva) Vadivambigai (Parvathi)
- Features: Temple tank: Sringa Theertham, Cauvery; Temple tree: Pirambu

Location
- Location: Thirukodikaval
- State: Tamil Nadu
- Country: India
- Coordinates: 11°2′58.28″N 79°30′46.11″E

Architecture
- Type: Chola art and architecture

Thirukoteeswarar Temple (திருக்கோடீசுவரர் கோயில்) is a Hindu temple located at Thirukodikaval in the Thiruvidaimarudur taluk of Thanjavur district in Tamil Nadu, India. The temple is dedicated to Shiva.

== History ==
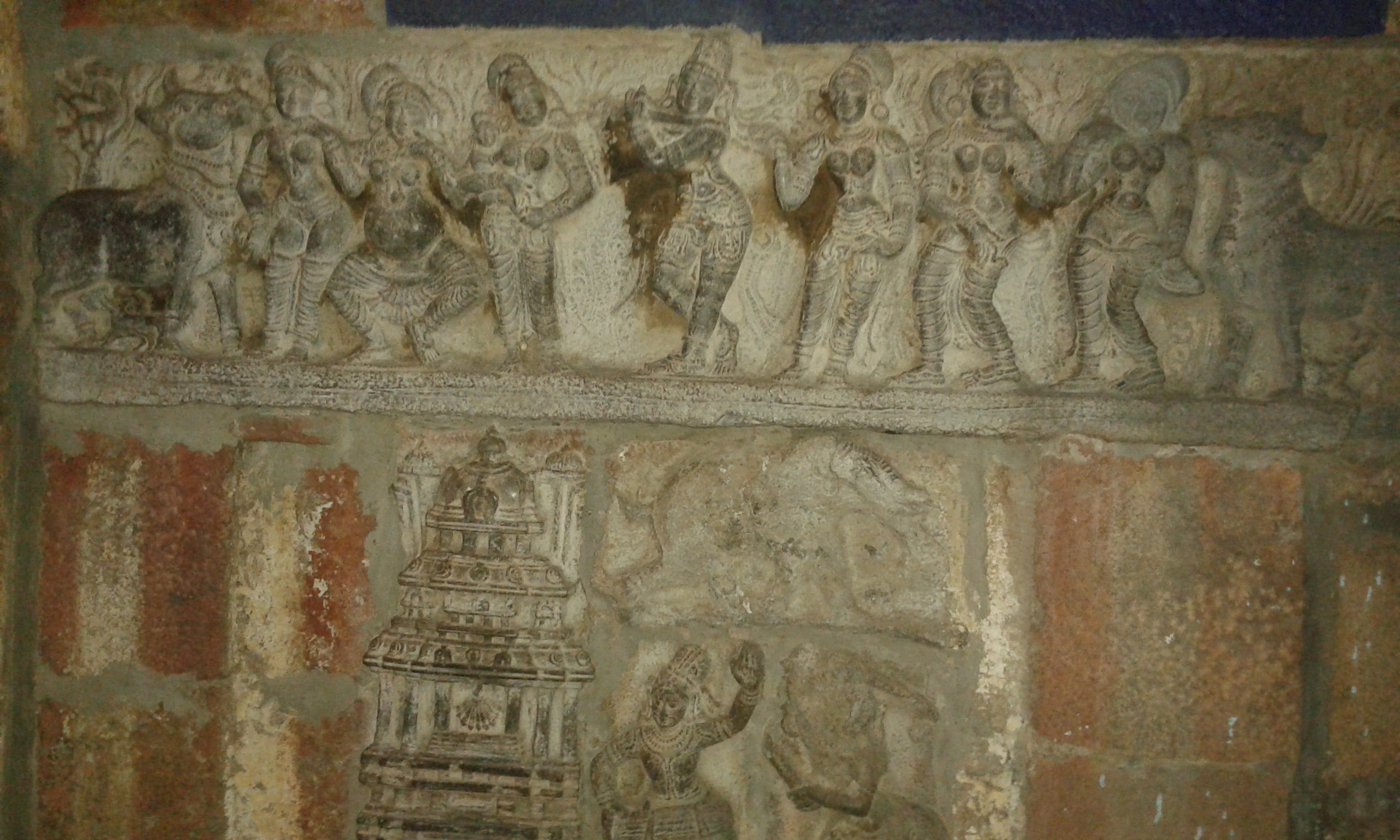
Sculptures on the walls of the Gopuram

The earliest inscriptions in the temple date from 750 AD and belong to the reign of the Pallava king Nandivarman. The present structure is believed to have been constructed by Sembiyan Mahadevi, the mother of Uttama Chola in 979. An inscription from the period of Gandaraditya I indicates a gift of 8 ma of land to the temple by Masenan Madan of Sirukattur to supply five pots of water everyday from the river Kaveri by the servants.

== Significance ==
Praises of the temple have been sung by the Saivite saints Appar and Sambandar. The temple was also visited by the saint Bhaskararaya of Bhaskararajapuram. The temple has separate shrines for Vinayaga, Muruga, Gajalakshmi, Saptha Kanniyar, Bhairavar, Surya, Chandra,Bala Sani, Yama, Chitragupta,Durvasa and Nataraja. The temple is counted as one of the temples built on the northern banks of River Kaveri.

== Gallery ==
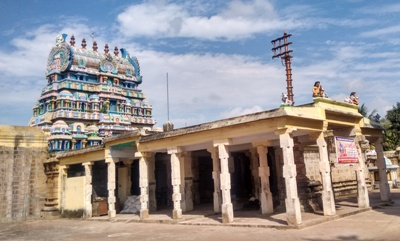
Front mandapa

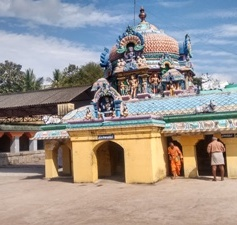
Dahskinamurti shrine

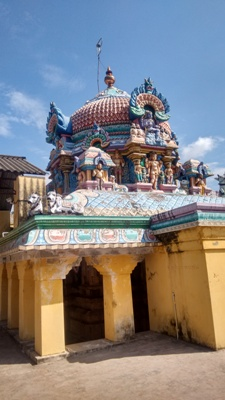
Presiding deity vimana

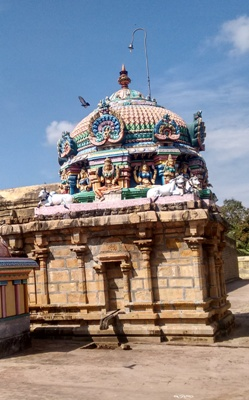
Amman shrine vimana

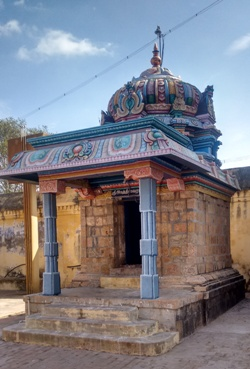
Agastiswarar shrine

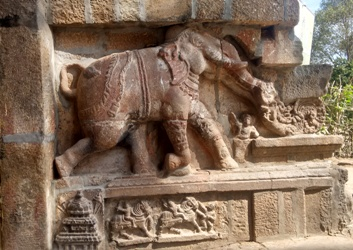
Sculptures in temple gopura entrance

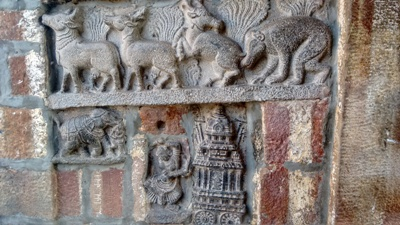
Sculptures in temple gopura entrance
