= Thiruvalangadu, Mayiladuthurai =

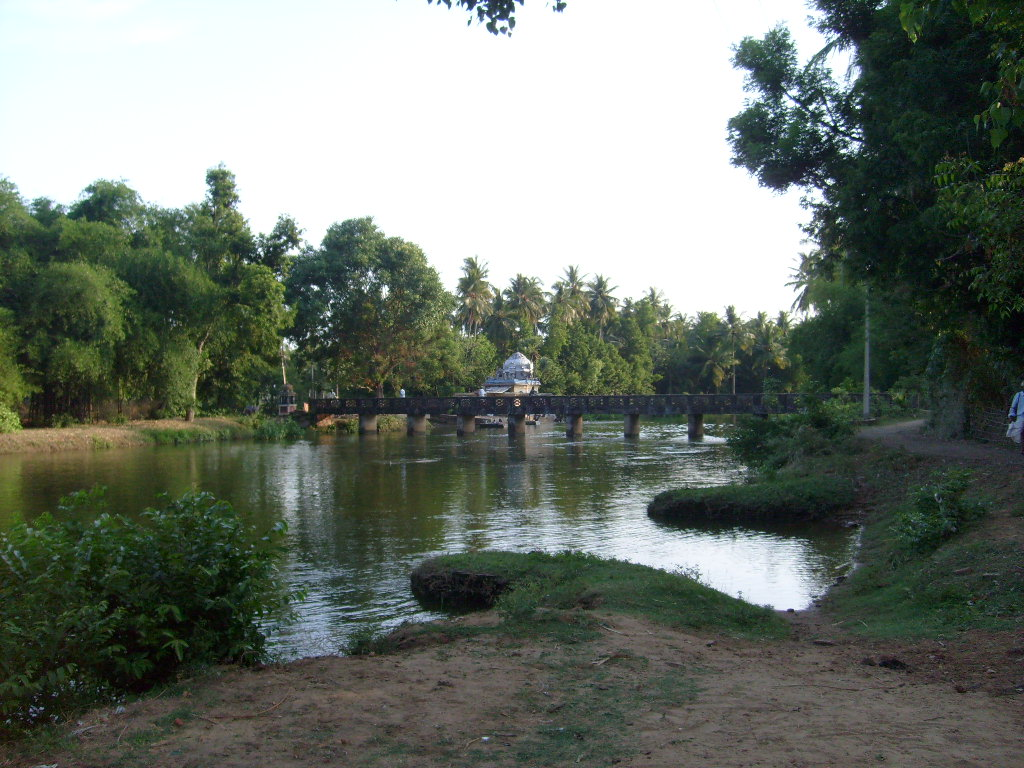
Bridge on the Cauvery River connecting Thiruvalangadu with Bhaskararajapuram

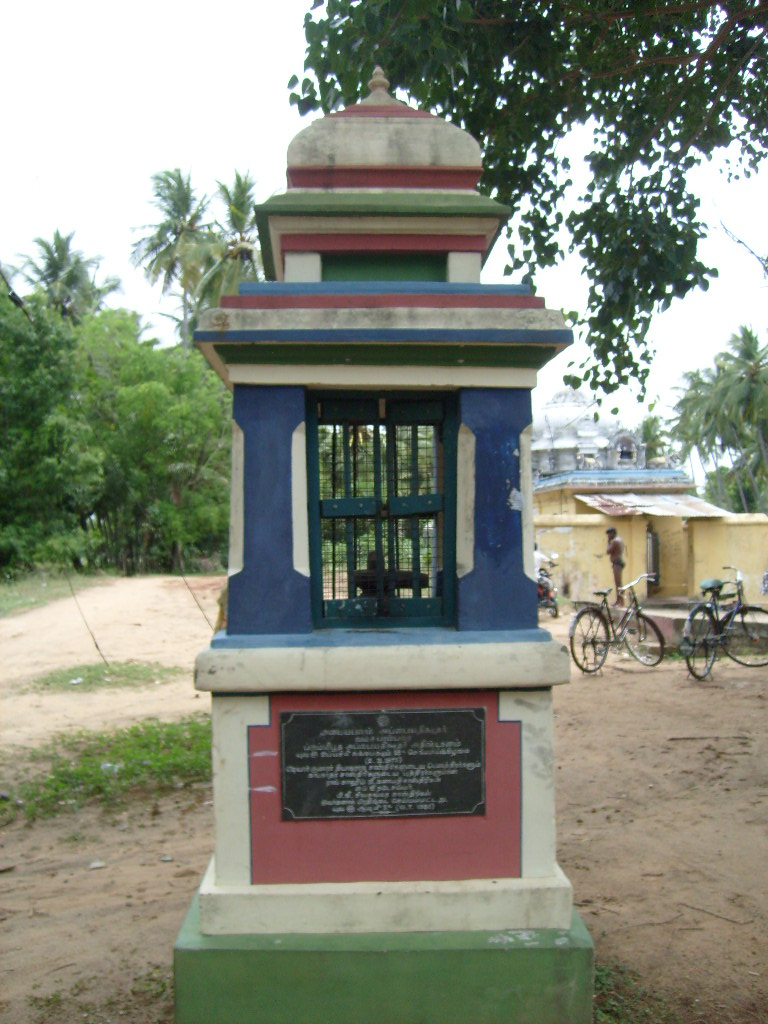
Samadhi of Advaitic savant Appayya Dikshitar at Thiruvalangadu

Thiruvalangadu is a town in Kuthalam taluk of Mayiladuthurai district. It is situated on the Mayiladuthurai-Kumbakonam road. It is situated between Aduthurai and Kuthalam at a distance of about 25 kilometres from Kumbakonam and 13 kilometres from Mayiladuthurai.

The samadhi of Advaita scholar Appayya Dikshitar is situated on the banks of the Kaveri River adjoining Bhaskararajapuram.

Thiruvalangadu is situated in Bank of Cavery.
