= Shani =

Hindu deity associated with Saturn

- Saturn
- Member of Navagraha
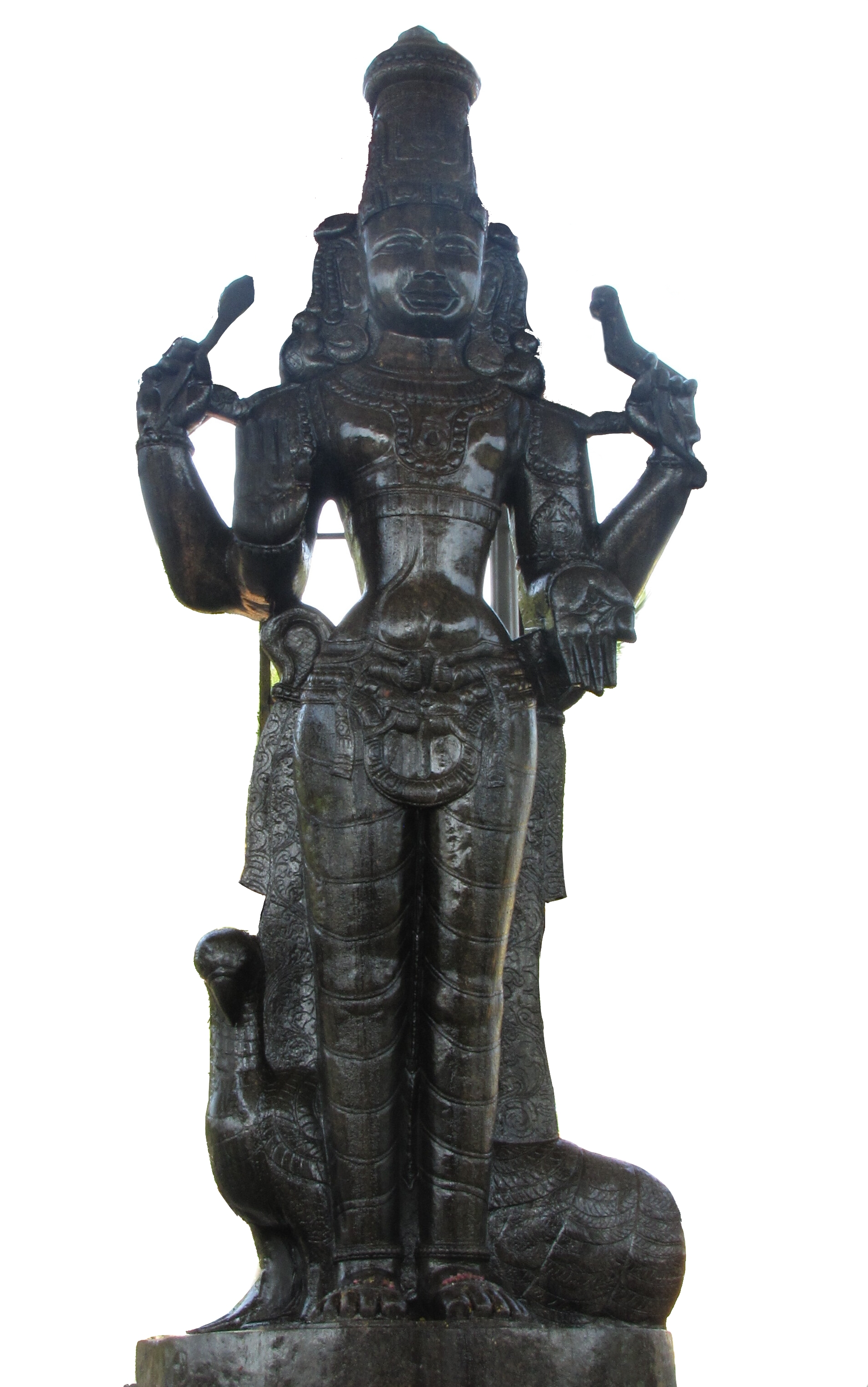
- Sculpture of Shani at Udupi, Karnataka
- Other names: Shanishvara, Chhayasutha, Pingala, Kokan, Kakadhvaja, Konastha, Babhru, Raudra, Raudrantaka, Shanescharam, Sauri, Manda, Krishna, Pipplayshraya, Raviputram, Antak
- Devanagari: शनि
- Affiliation: Navagraha
- Abode: Shaniloka
- Planet: Saturn
- Mantra: "Om Kakadhvajaya; Vidmahe; Khadga Hastaya; Dhimahi; Tanno Mandah Prachodayat" and "Om Sham Shanaishchara Namah"
- Weapon: Sceptre, Trident, Axe
- Tree: Jammi/Peepal/Shami/ Khejri or Ghaf tree.
- Day: Saturday
- Color: Blue, Black
- Number: Eight (8), 17 and 26
- Mount: Buffalo, Lion, Deer, Donkey, Horse, Dog (in animals) Crow and Vulture (in birds)
- Texts: Brahma Vaivarta Purana, Harivamsa
- Gender: Male
- Festivals: Shani Jayanti

Genealogy
- Parents: Surya (father); Chhaya (mother)
- Siblings: Tapati, Savarni Manu, Yama, Yami, Ashvins, Shraddhadeva Manu, Revanta, Bhadra, Sugriva and Karna
- Consort: A daughter of Chitraratha

Equivalents
- Etruscan: Satre
- Greek: Cronus
- Norse: Njörðr
- Roman: Saturn

Shani (Sanskrit: शनि, IAST: Śani), or Shanaishchara (Sanskrit: शनैश्चर, IAST: Śanaiścara), is the divine personification of the planet Saturn in Hinduism, and is one of the nine heavenly objects (Navagraha) in Hindu astrology. Shani is also a male Hindu deity in the Puranas, whose iconography consists of a figure with a dark complexion carrying a sword or danda (sceptre) and sitting on a buffalo or some times on a crow. He is the god of karma, time and retribution, and delivers results depending upon one's thoughts, speech, and deeds. Shani is married to the daughter of gandharva Chitraratha, who cursed him that anyone he gazed upon would face destruction or hardship.

== Planet ==
Shani as a planet appears in various Hindu astronomical texts in Sanskrit, such as the 5th-century Aryabhatiya by Aryabhatta, the 6th-century Romaka by Latadeva and Pancha Siddhantika by Varahamihira, the 7th-century Khandakhadyaka by Brahmagupta and the 8th-century Sisyadhivrddida by Lalla, where it is referred to by several names such as Āra, Koṇa, and Kroḍa. These texts present Shani as one of the planets and estimate the characteristics of the respective planetary motion. Other texts such as Surya Siddhanta (dated to sometime between the 5th and 10th century) present their chapters on various planets as divine knowledge linked to deities.

The manuscripts of these texts exist in slightly different versions, suggesting that the texts were open and revised over time. The versions disagree in their measurements of Shani's revolutions, apogee, epicycles, nodal longitudes, orbital inclination, and other parameters. For example, both Khandakhadyaka and Surya Siddhanta of Varaha state that Shani completes 146,564 revolutions on its own axis every 4,320,000 earth years, an Epicycle of Apsis as 60 degrees, and had an apogee (aphelia) of 240 degrees in 499 CE; while another manuscript of Surya Siddhantha revises the revolutions to 146,568, the apogee to 236 degrees and 37 seconds and the Epicycle to about 49 degrees.

The 1st-millennium-CE Hindu scholars had estimated the time it took for sidereal revolutions of each planet including Shani, from their astronomical studies, with slightly different results:

Sanskrit texts: How many days does it take for Shani (Saturn) to complete its orbit?
Source	Estimated time per sidereal revolution
Surya Siddhanta	10,765 days, 18 hours, 33 minutes, 13.6 seconds
Siddhanta Shiromani	10,765 days, 19 hours, 33 minutes, 56.5 seconds
Ptolemy	10,758 days, 17 hours, 48 minutes, 14.9 seconds
20th-century calculations	10,759 days, 5 hours, 16 minutes, 32.2 seconds

== Iconography ==
Shani is depicted wearing blue or black robes, having a dark complexion and riding a vulture or on an iron chariot drawn by eight horses. He holds in his hands a bow, an arrow, an axe and a trident. He is canonically represented riding on a large crow or vulture which follows him wherever he goes. Some Hindu texts also depict him riding other animals such as a horse, a snake or a buffalo, while Buddhist texts from Northeastern India and Nepal uniformly represent him mounted on a tortoise.

Shani is believed to be an incarnation of Krishna, on the authority of Brahma Vaivarta Purana where Krishna says that he is "Shani among planets". He is also called Saneeswar, meaning "Lord of Saturn", and is designated the task of granting the fruits of one's actions, thus becoming the most feared amongst Hindu astrological gods. He is often the most misunderstood deity in the Hindu Pantheon as he is said to cause persistent chaos in one's life, and is known to be milder if worshipped.

In Vedic astrology, Shani (the planet Saturn) is the ultimate cosmic teacher of discipline, duty, and karma. Rather than just punishing, Shani tests individuals through delays and hard work to build resilience and guide them toward spiritual growth. People with strong Shani energy typically value consistency, accountability, and long-term goals.

== Calendar ==
Shani is the basis for Shanivara – one of the seven days that make a week in the Hindu calendar. This day corresponds to Saturday – after Saturn – in the Greco-Roman convention for naming the days of the week. Shani is considered to be the most malefic planet that brings restrictions and misfortunes.

Shani is part of the Navagraha in the Hindu zodiac system. It is considered malefic, associated with spiritual asceticism, penance, discipline and conscientious work. The role and importance of the Navagraha developed over time with various influences. Deifying planetary bodies and their astrological significance occurred as early as the Vedic period and was recorded in the Vedas. The earliest work of astrology recorded in India is the Vedanga Jyotisha which began to be compiled in the 14th century BCE. It was possibly based on works from the Indus Valley Civilization as well as various foreign influences.

The Navagraha developed from early works of astrology over time. Saturn and various classical planets were referenced in the Atharvaveda around 1000 BCE. The Navagraha was furthered by additional contributions from Western Asia, including Zoroastrian and Hellenistic influences. The Yavanajataka, or 'Science of the Yavanas', was written by the Indo-Greek named "Yavanesvara" ("Lord of the Greeks") under the rule of the Western Kshatrapa king Rudrakarman I. The Yavanajataka written in 120 CE is often attributed to standardizing Indian astrology. The Navagraha would further develop and culminate in the Shaka era with the Saka or Scythian people. Additionally the contributions by the Saka people would be the basis of the Indian national calendar, which is also called the Saka calendar.

The Hindu calendar is a Lunisolar calendar which records both lunar and solar cycles. Like the Navagraha, it was developed with the successive contributions of various works.

Planet Shani rules over the zodiac signs Capricorn and Aquarius, two of the twelve constellations in the zodiac system of Hindu astrology. If Shani rules over one's zodiac sign, it is said that one must wear a ring with a stone made of Blue Sapphire.

== Deity ==
Shani is a deity in medieval-era texts, who is considered inauspicious and is feared for delivering misfortune and loss to those who deserve it. He is also capable of conferring boons and blessings to the worthy, depending upon their karma. In medieval Hindu literature, he is mainly referred to as the son of Surya and Chhaya, or in a few accounts as the son of Balarama and Revati. According to some Hindu texts, the "pipal" or fig tree is the abode of Shani (while other texts associate the same tree with Vasudeva). He is also believed to be the greatest teacher who rewards righteous acts and punishes those who follow the path of evil, Adharma and betrayal. According to the Brahma Vaivarta Purana, Shani is a great devotee of Lord Krishna and once during his worship, Shani ignored his wife, the daughter of gandharva king Chitraratha. In fury, she cursed him to have a gaze that would inflict misfortune to whomever it falls upon

== Mantra translation ==
Shani's mantra is depicted here in Sanskrit and English:

Sanskrit: ॐ काकध्वजाय विद्महे खड्ग हस्ताय धीमहि तन्नो मंदः प्रचोदयात् ।

Transliteration: "Om kākadhvajāya vidmahe khaḍgahastāya dhīmahi tanno mandaḥ pracodayāt.''

Translation: Om, Let me meditate on him who has crow in his flag, Oh, He who has a sword in his hand, give me higher intellect, And let Saneeswara illuminate my mind.

Sanskrit: ॐ नीलांजन समाभासं रविपुत्रं यमाग्रजम् छाया मार्तांड संभूतं त्वां नमामि शनीश्वरम् ।

Transliteration: "Om nīlāñjana samābhāsaṁ raviputraṁ yamāgrajam chāyā mārtāṇḍa saṁbhūtaṁ tvāṁ namāmi śanaiścharam"

Translation: O Lord, You are like the Blue Sapphire and You admire the Blue Sapphire, You are the son of Lord Surya, and Brother of Lord Yama. You are the son of Lord Surya and Goddess Chhaya, I bow to you Lord of Planet Saturn.

== Dedicated Day ==
On Saturdays, it is believed that one should worship Lord Shani to keep oneself away from evil and to reduce the hardships of life as he blesses those who willingly and voluntarily donate to the poor without seeking anything in return.

Shani puja is usually done to keep one safe from Lord Shani's malefic effects.

== Shani temples across India ==
Shani temples are found in more populated areas of India, such as Shani Dham in Char Dham, Vrindavan, Maharashtra, Madhya Pradesh, Haryana, Puducherry/Pondicherry, Tamil Nadu, Karnataka, West Bengal and Andhra Pradesh. Shani Shingnapur Dham in particular is a famous holy place associated with Shani. Shani Shinganapur or Shingnapur is a village in the Indian state of Maharashtra. Situated in Nevasa taluka in Ahmednagar district, the village is known for its popular temple of Shani. Shingnapur is 35 km from Ahmednagar city.

There is a separate shrine for Shani Bhaghavan inside the Kashi Vishwanath Temple .

In south India, the popular Shani temples are Thirunallar, Kuchanoor, Tirukodikaval Thirukoteeswarar Temple where is a Bala Shani.

More common than Shani temples are artwork related to the deity, which are found in all types of temples of various traditions within Hinduism, mostly connected to Shaivism. Exceptionally, the Koodal Azhagar Vishnu temple in Madurai has Navagraha shrines including Shani Bhagavan. The popularity of praying to Shani, especially on Saturdays, has increased gradually over the years.

== Media gallery ==
Statue at lord Shanaishchara temple in Mysore bank circle, Bengaluru (2026)

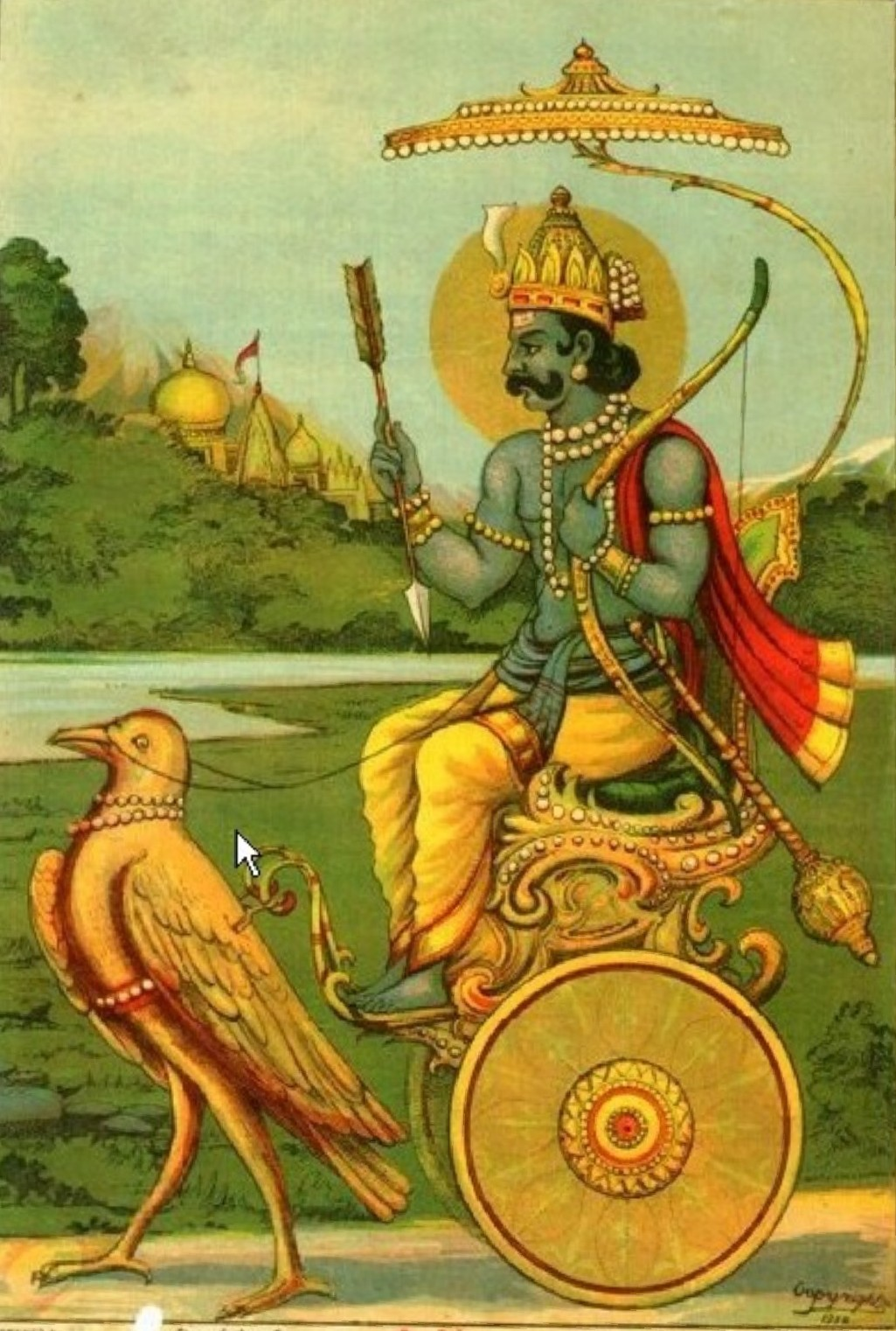
Shani by Raja Ravi Varma

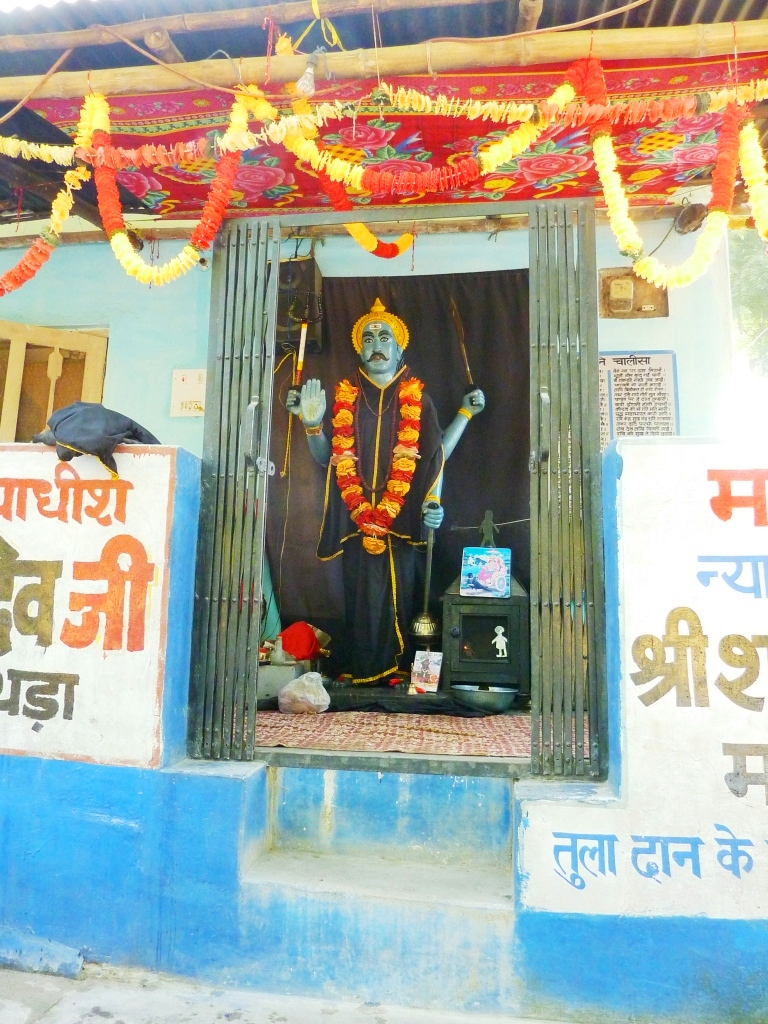
Shani wayside shrine between Dharamsala and Chandigarh, 2010

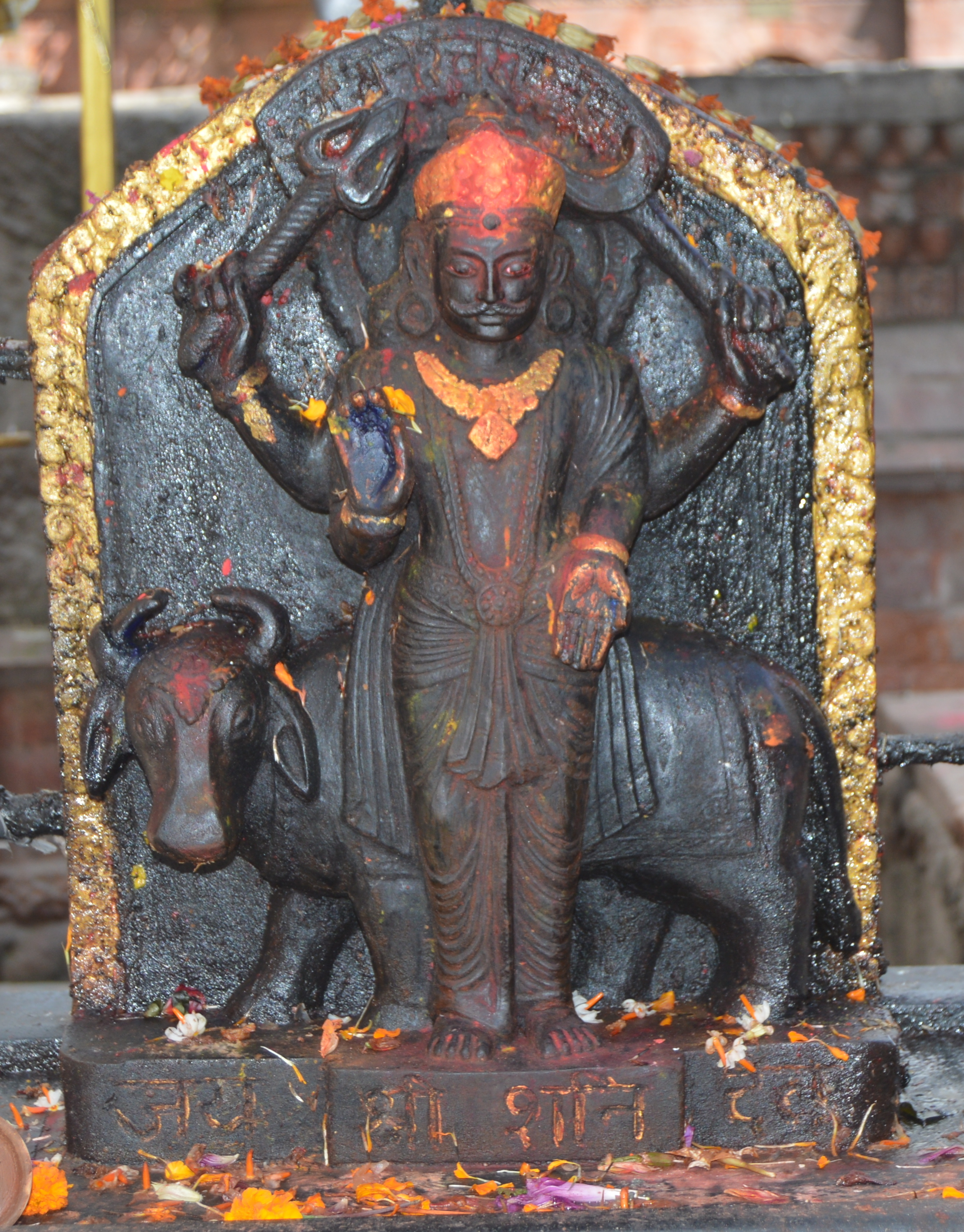
Shani statue at Naksaal Bhagwati Temple

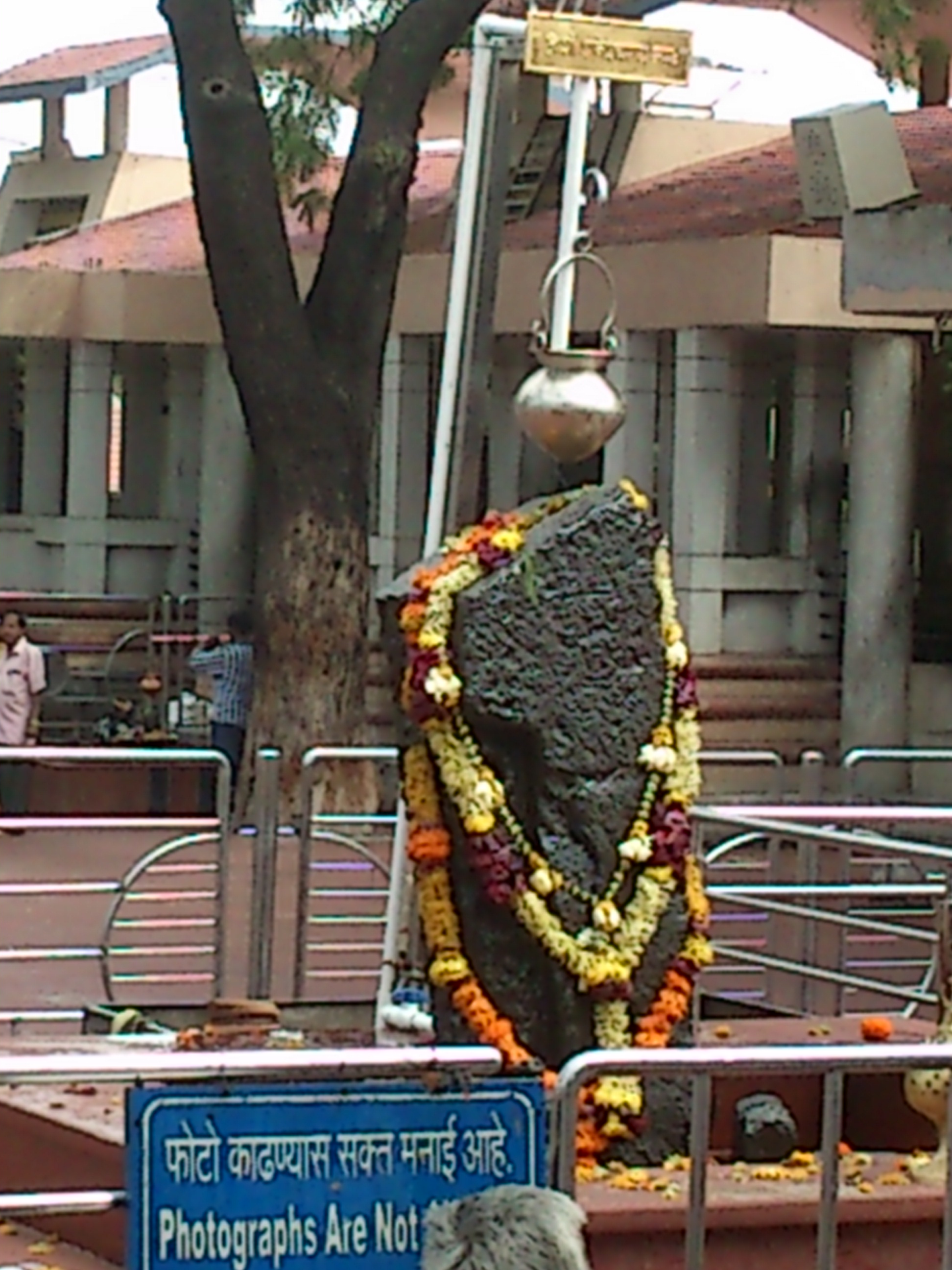
Vigraha of Shani Dev at Shingnapur Shani Temple

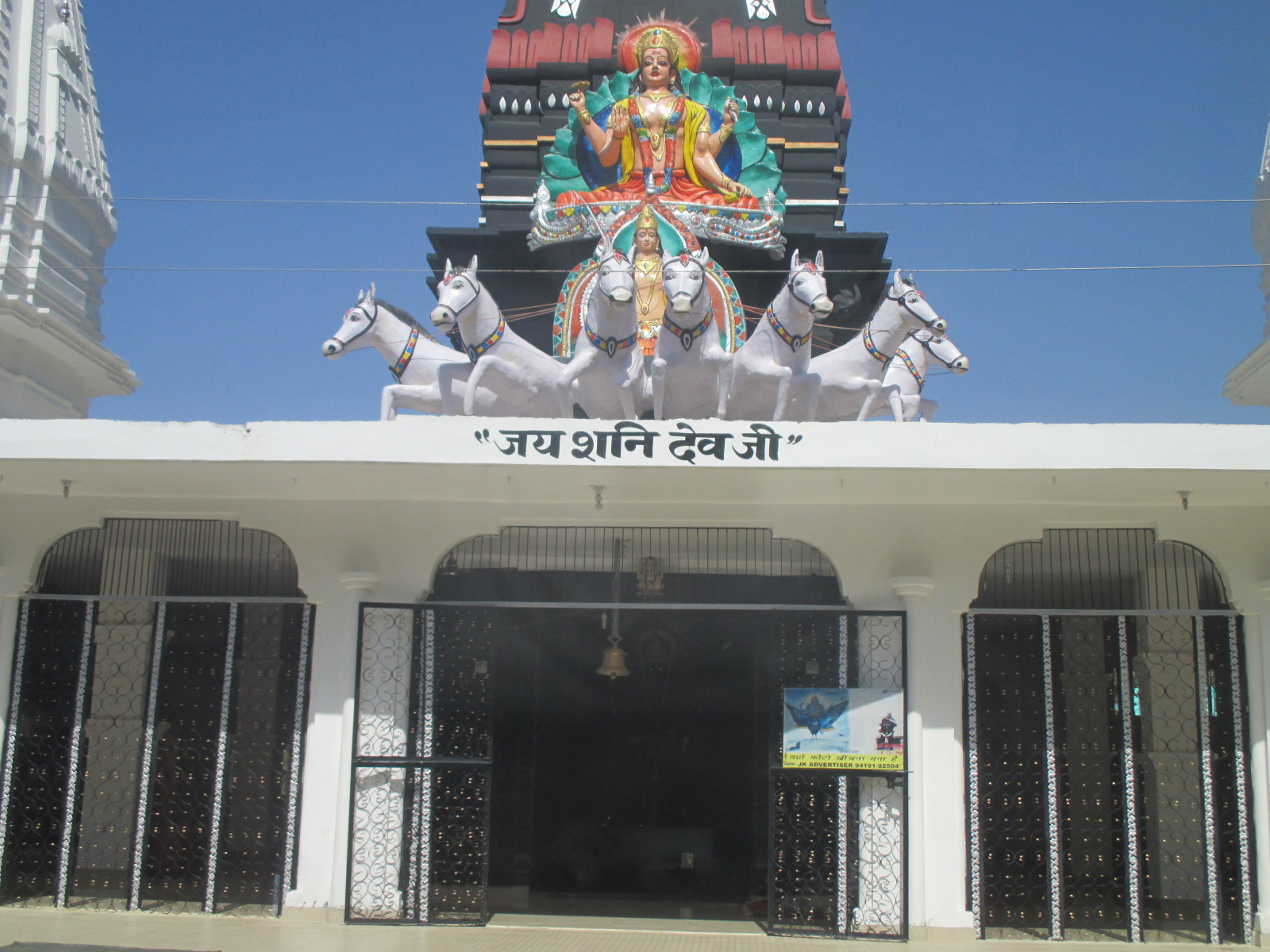
Entrance of a Shani temple in Jammu

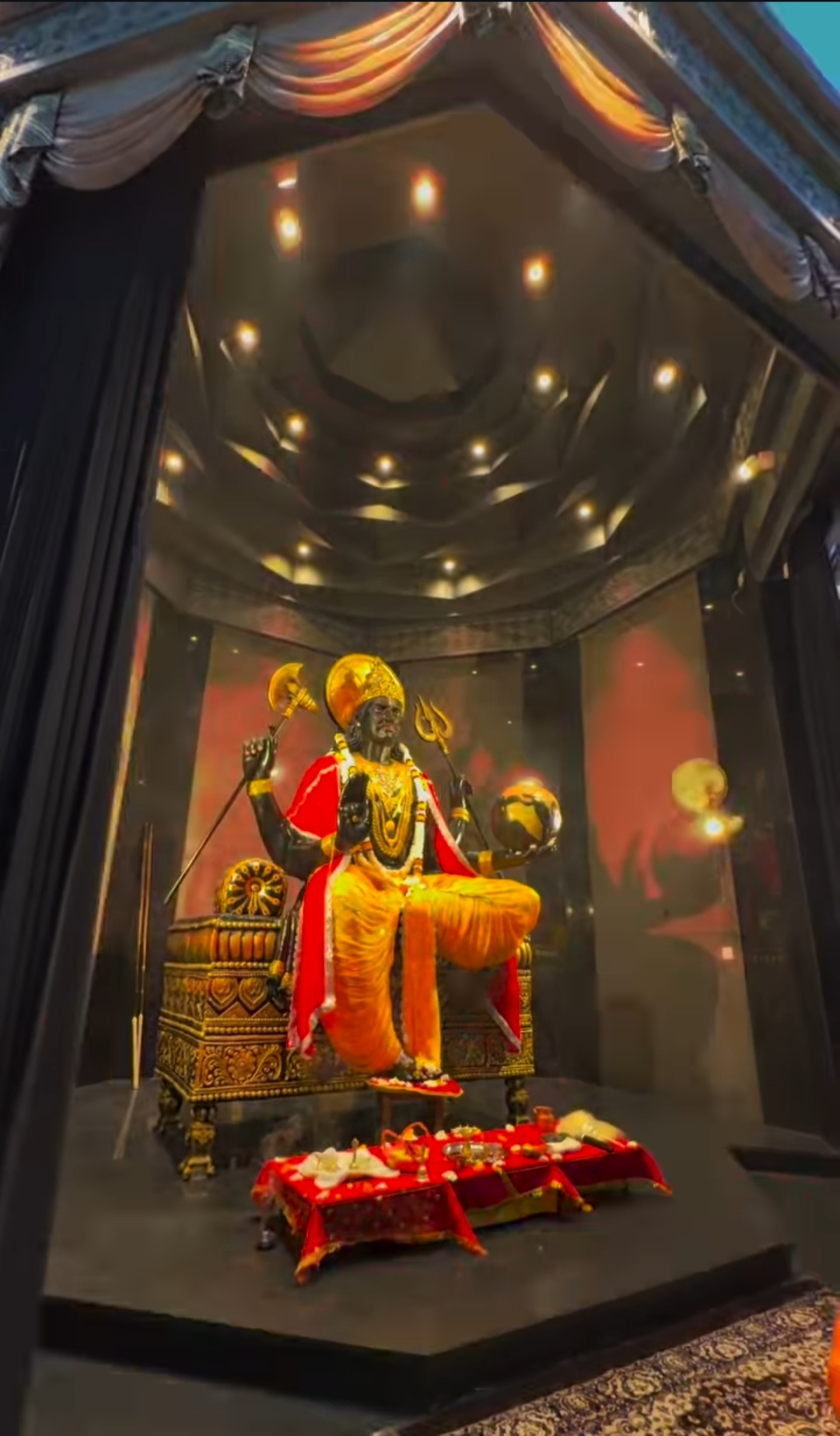
Lord Shani Dev idol in Shani Dham Char Dham, Vrindavan

== See also ==
- Rigvedic deities
  - Nakshatra
  - List of Natchathara temples
  - Aditi
  - Surya Namaskar
- Kakabhushundi
- List of Hindu deities
- List of Hindu temples
- List of Hindu pilgrimage sites
- Saturn (mythology) – God in ancient Roman mythology
