= List of districts of Puducherry =

Puducherry is a Union Territory of India, with four exclaved districts; Puducherry district and Karaikal district (surrounded by the state of Tamil Nadu), Mahé district (surrounded by the state of Kerala) and Yanam district (surrounded by the state of Andhra Pradesh), with Pondicherry district having the largest area and population and Mahe district having the smallest area and population. All four districts retained the borders of French India, and were incorporated into the Republic of India after the de facto transfer of the territories of French India in 1954.

Administratively Puducherry only has 2 districts, Puducherry and Karaikal. The districts of Yanam and Mahé are census districts and not administrative districts. The sub-taluks covered by these 2 census districts are administratively under the Puducherry district.

== Districts ==
ISO 3166-2 Code	Sl No	District	Headquarters	Population (2011)	Area (km^{2})	Density (/km^{2})	Official website
IN-PY-KA	1	Karaikal district	Karaikal	200,222	160	1,252	http://karaikal.gov.in/
IN-PY-MA	2	Mahé district	Mahé	41,934	9	4,659	http://mahe.gov.in/
IN-PY-PO	3	Puducherry district	Pondicherry	946,600	293	3,231	http://puducherry-dt.gov.in/
IN-PY-YA	4	Yanam district	Yanam	55,616	30	3,272	http://yanam.gov.in/

== See also ==
- Puducherry
- French India
- Union Territory
- List of communes in Puducherry
