= Bhaskararajapuram =

- village
- Interactive map of Bhaskararajapuram
- Coordinates: 11.0529314°N 79.5142937°E
- Country: India
- State: Tamil Nadu
- District: Thanjavur
- Named for: Bhaskararaya

Population (2001)
  - Total: 490

Languages
  - Official: Tamil
- Time zone: UTC+5:30 (IST)

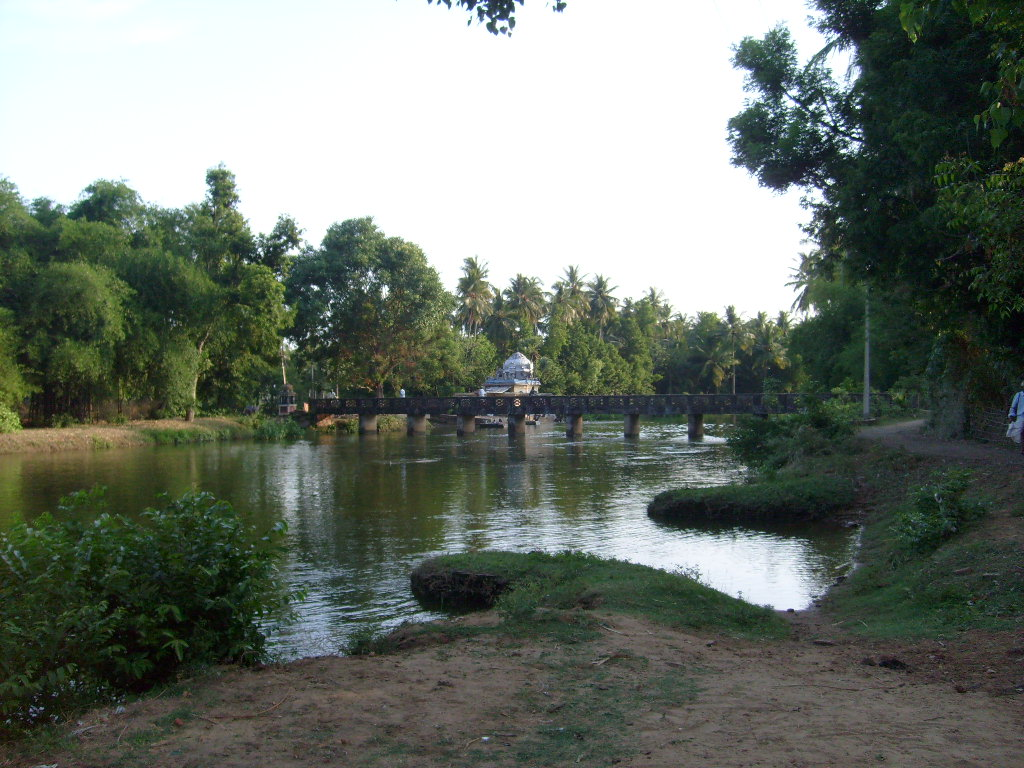
The bridge on the Cauvery River connecting the village of Bhaskararajapuram with Thiruvalangadu on the other side of the river

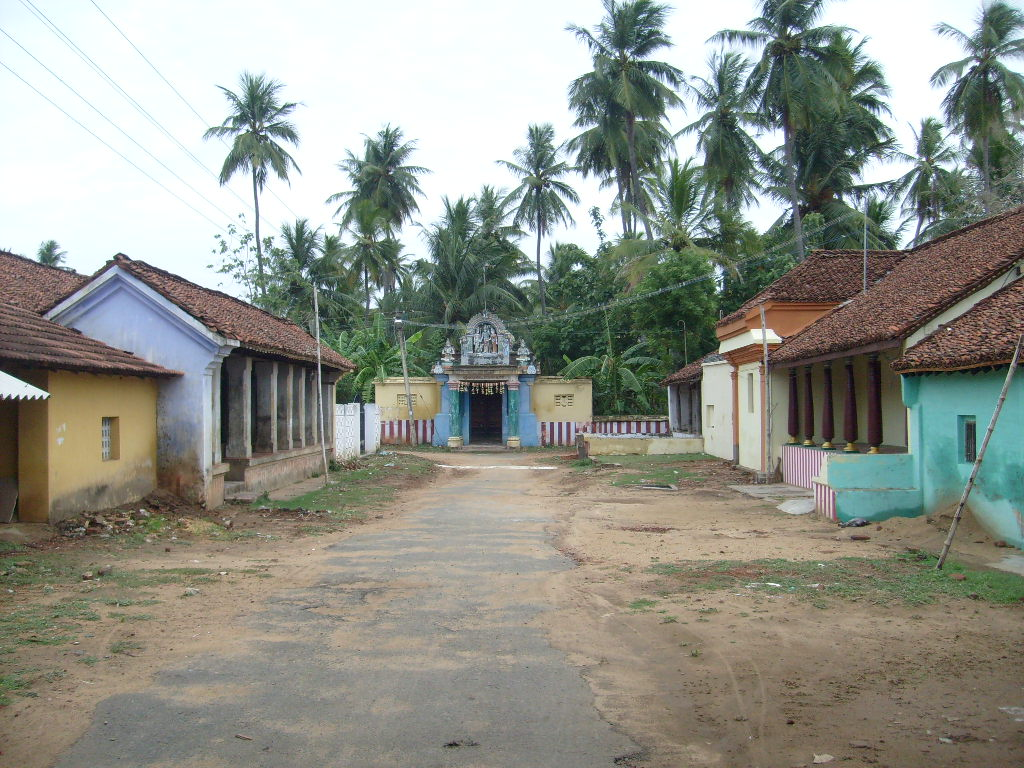
Agraharam in Bhaskararajapuram

Bhaskararajapuram is a village in the Thiruvidaimarudur taluk of the Thanjavur district of the Indian state of Tamil Nadu. It is named after the 18th century Hindu saint Bhaskara Raya who is believed to have attained samadhi at this place and is separated from the neighbouring town of Thiruvalangadu by the Cauvery River and the Vikraman River.

The syllables that make "Bhaskara" are energetic bijaksharas, people having this name are " embodiments of luck"

The Akshara Matruka Maha Mantapam was inmaugurated by K. Mohan Guruji, Life Trustee and president of Pujyasri Bhaskaracharya Memorial Foundation, on 2 August 2009.
