= Puducherry (union territory) =

Union territory of India

- Union Territory
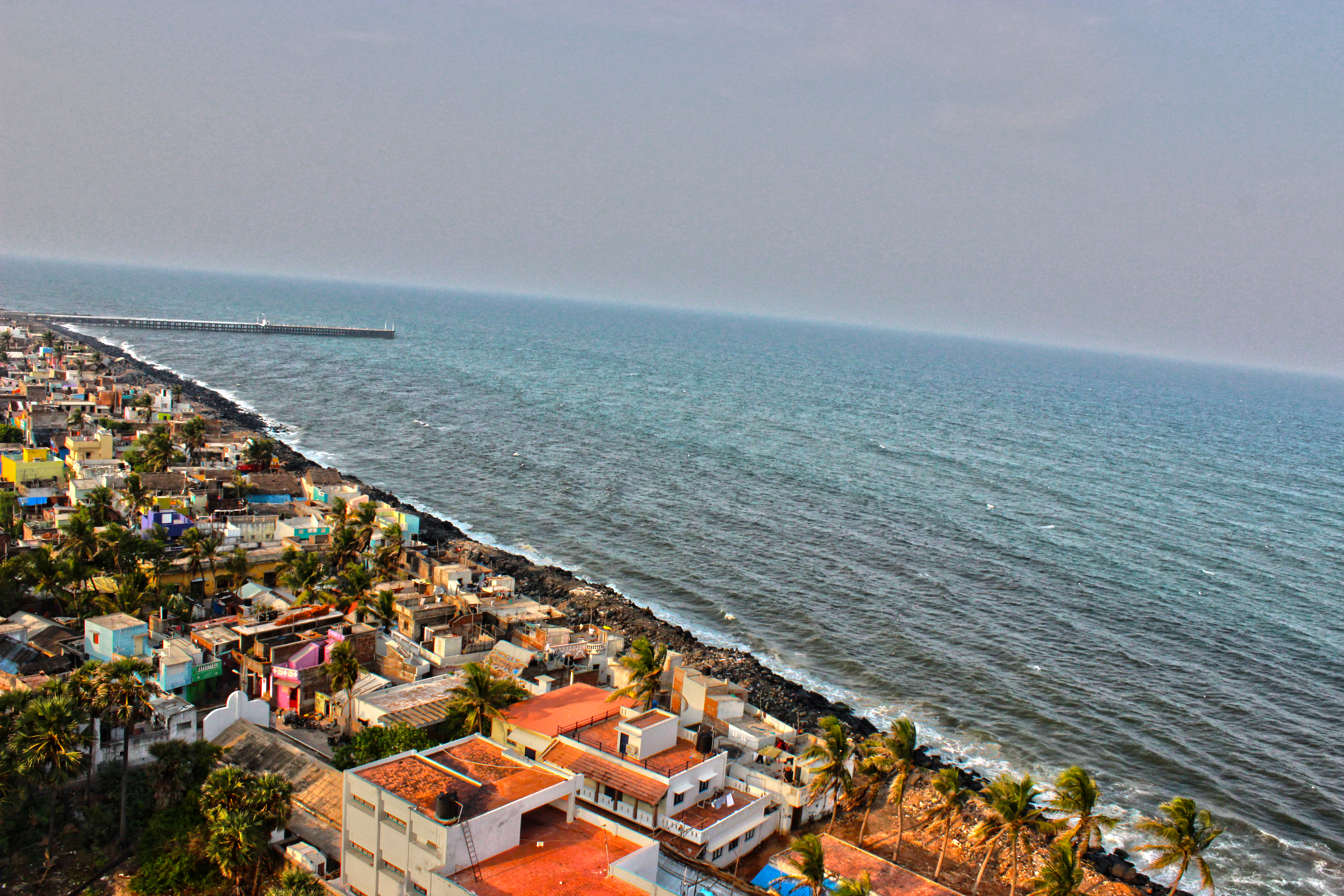
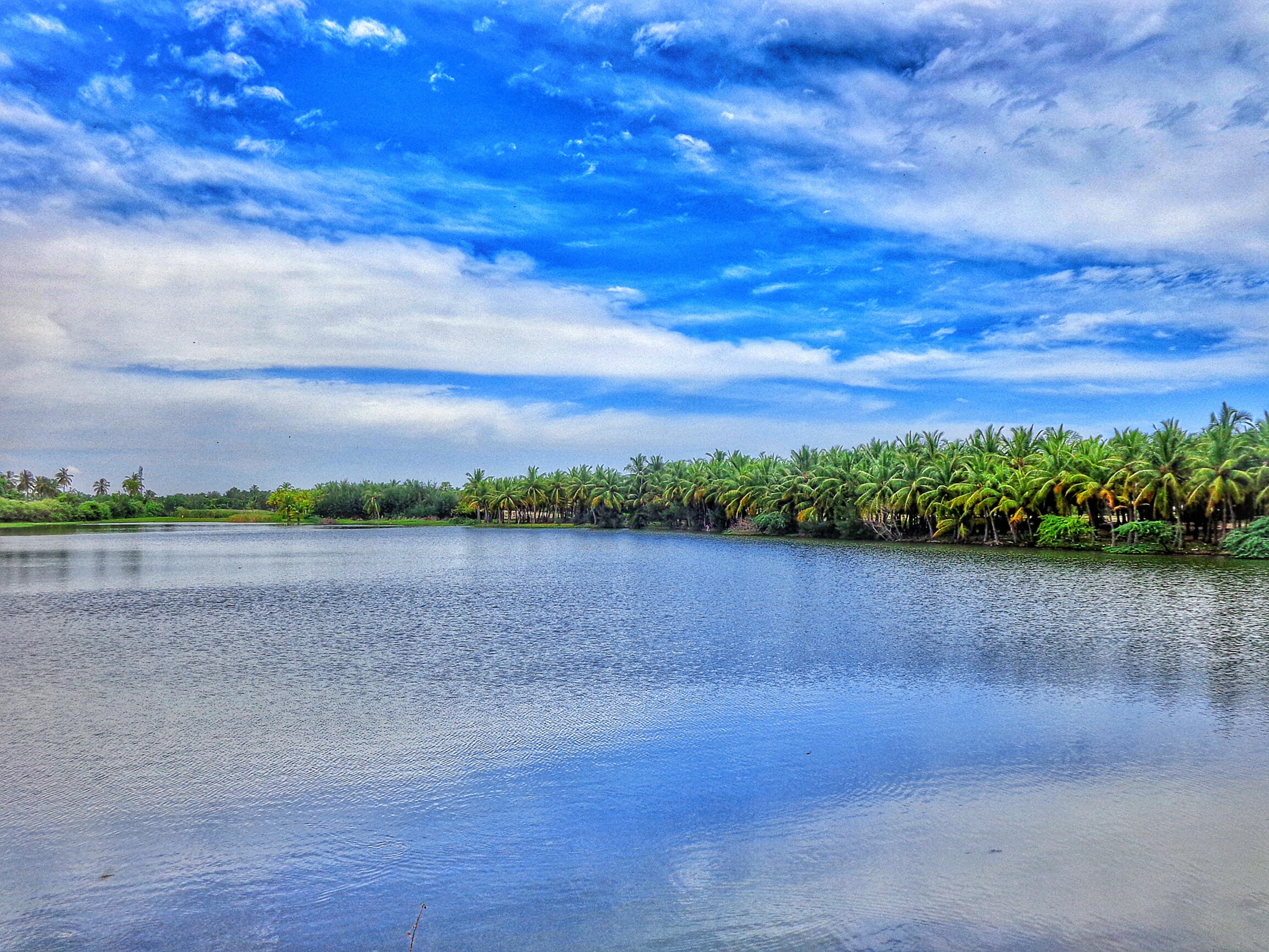
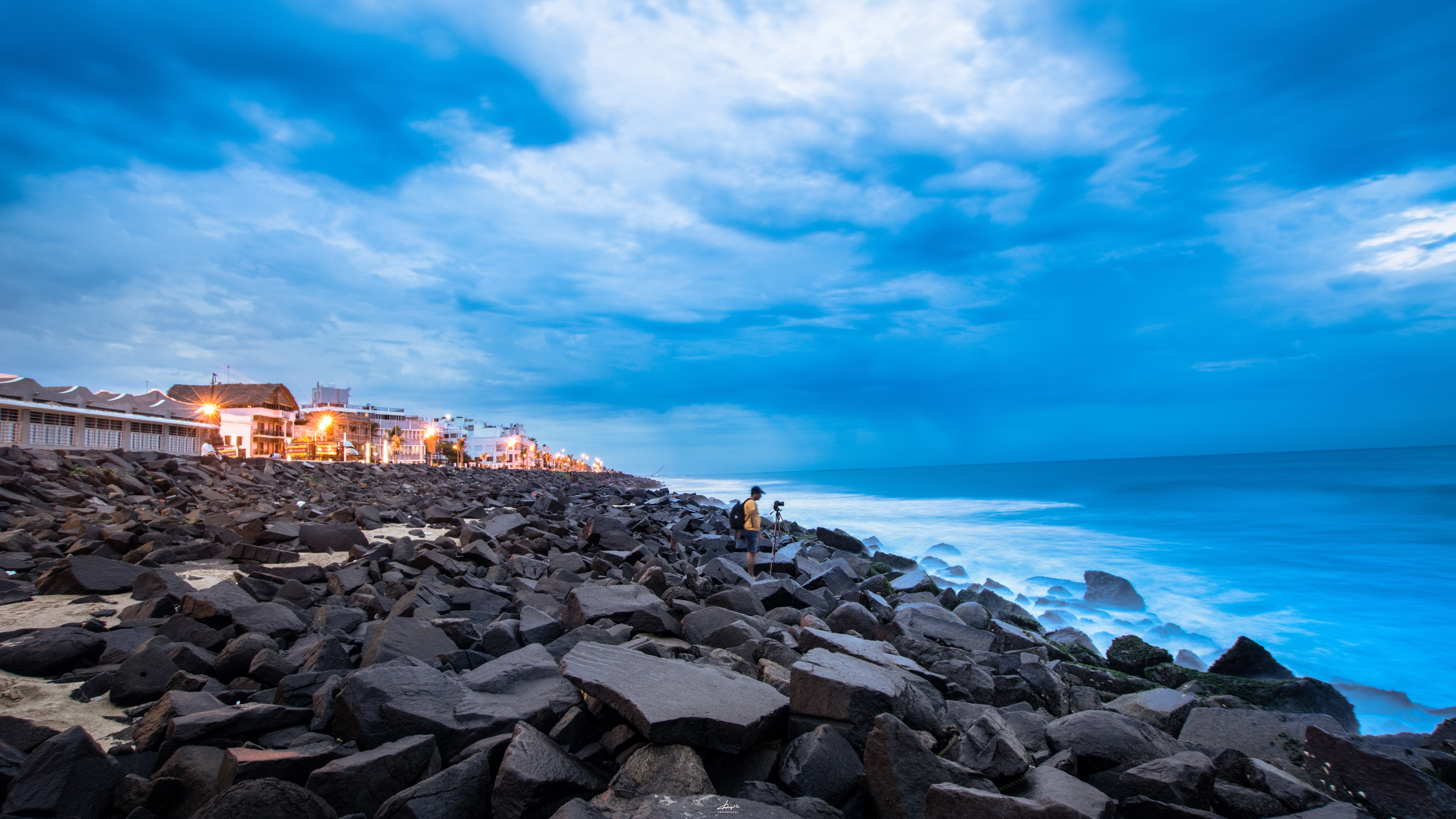
- Promenade Beach Pondicherry harbour Beach in Pondicherry

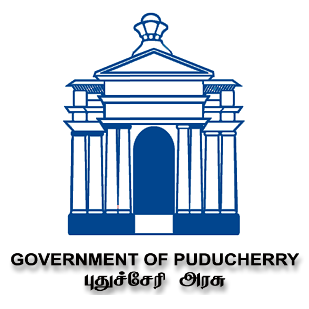
- Emblem of Puducherry
- Etymology: Putu (new) + Cēri (settlement) "New Settlement"
- Motto: Satyameva Jayate (Sanskrit) "Truth alone triumphs"
- Anthem: Tamil Thai Valthu (Tamil) "Prayer to Mother Tamil"
- Location of Puducherry in India
- Coordinates: 11.911°N 79.813°E
- Country: India
- Region: South India
- Admission to union: 1 November 1954
- Formation: 1 July 1963
- Capital and largest city: Pondicherry
- Districts: 4

Government
  - Body: Government of Puducherry
  - Lieutenant Governor: Kuniyil Kailashnathan
  - Chief Minister: N. Rangaswamy (AINRC)
  - Chief Secretary: Sharat Chauhan

Area
  - Total: 483 km^{2} (186 sq mi)
  - Rank: 34th
- Highest elevation (Unnamed point near Chalakara Village): 67 m (220 ft)
- Lowest elevation (Bay of Bengal and Laccadive Sea): 0 m (0 ft)

Population (2011)
  - Total: 1,394,467
  - Rank: 29th
  - Density: 2,900/km^{2} (7,500/sq mi)
  - Urban: 68.33%
  - Rural: 31.67%

Language
  - Official: Tamil • Malayalam (Mahe) • Telugu (Yanam)
  - Additional official: English • French

GDP
  - Total (2023-24): ₹0.39 trillion (US$4.2 billion)
  - Rank: 26th
  - Per capita: ₹302,680 (US$3,200) (10th)
- Time zone: UTC+05:30 (IST)
- ISO 3166 code: IN-PY
- Vehicle registration: PY 01 – PY 05
- HDI (2022): ▲0.786 (High) (4th)
- Literacy (2024): 92.7% (9th)
- Sex ratio (2011): 1037♀️/1000 ♂️
- Website: py.gov.in
- Symbols of Puducherry
- Bird: Koel
- Flower: Cannonball tree flower
- Mammal: Indian palm squirrel
- Tree: Bael fruit tree
- List of union territory symbols
- Territories of French India were completely transferred to the Republic of India de facto.

Puducherry (Note: /ˌpʊdʊˈtʃɛri/ PUU-duu-CHERR-ee; Tamil: Putuccēri [pʊðʊˈtːɕeːɾi].) (also known as Poudouchéry in French or historically as Pondicherry (Note: /ˌpɒndɪˈtʃɛri/ PON-dih-CHERR-ee; Tamil: Pāṇṭiccēri [paːɳɖiˈtːɕeːɾi].)) is a union territory of India, consisting of four small geographically unconnected districts. It was formed out of four territories of former French India, namely Pondichéry (now Puducherry), Karikal (Karaikal), Mahé and Yanaon (now Yanam), excluding Chandannagar (Chandernagore), and it is named after the largest district, Puducherry, which was also the capital of French India. Historically known as Pondicherry, the territory changed its official name to Puducherry on 1 October 2006.

The Union Territory of Puducherry lies in the southern part of the Indian Peninsula. The areas of Puducherry district and Karaikal district are bound by the state of Tamil Nadu, while Yanam district and Mahé district are enclosed by the states of Andhra Pradesh and Kerala, respectively. Puducherry is the 29th most populous of the 36 states and union territories of India, and the third most densely populated union territory. It has a gross domestic product (GDP) of ₹390 billion (US$4.2 billion) and ranks 25th in India.

== Etymology ==
Pondicherry is derived from Tamil putu-cēri "new village" and was first spelt as Poudichéry by the French. The u was later misread as n and the spelling Pondichéry stuck.

== History ==
The earliest recorded history of the municipality of Puducherry can be traced to the second century CE. The Periplus of the Erythraean Sea mentions a marketplace named Poduke or Poduka (ch 60). G. W. B. Huntingford suggested this might be a site about 2 miles from the modern Puducherry, which was possibly the location of Arikamedu (now part of Ariyankuppam). Huntingford noted that Roman pottery was found at Arikamedu in 1937. In addition, archaeological excavations between 1944 and 1949 showed that it was "a trading station to which goods of Roman manufacture were imported during the first half of the 1st century" Subsequent investigation by Vimala Begley from 1989 to 1992 modified this assessment, and now place the period of occupation from the third or second century BCE to the eighth century CE.

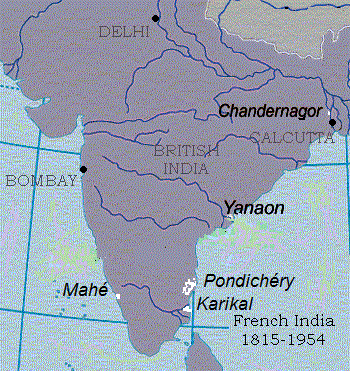
French Indian Colonies in 1815

In 1674, the municipality of Pondicherry (Pondichéry) became a colony in the French colonial empire. Together with Chandernagor (already French since 1673), Mahé (since 1721), Yanam (Yanaon) (since 1723), Karaikal (Karikal) (since 1739) and Masulipatam (1760), it formed the colony of French India, under a single French governor in Pondicherry, although French rule over one or more of these enclaves was repeatedly interrupted by British occupations. The territories of French India were completely transferred to the Republic of India de facto on 1 November 1954, and de jure on 16 August 1962, when French India ceased to exist, becoming the present Indian union territory of Pondicherry, combining four coastal enclaves. The fifth, Chandannagar, merged with the state of West Bengal in 1954. Immediately after the de facto transfer, the area was renamed the 'State of Pondicherry' by the "French Establishments (Change of Name) Order, 1954" issued by the Ministry of External Affairs of India. The State of Pondicherry continued to be under the direct control of the Government of India under the aegis of the Ministry of External affairs until 31 August 1964. Meanwhile, with effect from 1 July 1963, the State of Pondicherry officially became the Union Territory of Pondicherry and after 31 August 1964 it came under the control of the Ministry of Home Affairs.

Until 2016, the de jure transfer day (i.e. 16 August) was a public holiday with no official celebrations taking place. In 2016, Lt. Governor of Puducherry, Kiran Bedi, made it a holiday as "De Jure Transfer Day."

Since 2010, de facto transfer day (i.e. 1 November) has been celebrated as Liberation day throughout Puducherry. In 2014, Liberation day was declared as a public Holiday. This initiative was taken shortly after the NDA government came to power in 2014 and newly appointed Lt. Governor A. K. Singh issued a notification regarding that decision of the central government.

== Geography ==
Map showing the districts of Puducherry

The Union Territory of Puducherry consists of four small unconnected districts: Puducherry district (293 km^{2} or 113 sq mi), Karaikal district (161 km^{2} or 62 sq mi) and Yanam district (20 km^{2} or 7.7 sq mi) on the Bay of Bengal and Mahé district (9 km^{2} or 3.5 sq mi) on the Laccadive Sea, covering a total area of 483 km^{2} (186 sq mi). Puducherry and Karaikal have the largest areas and population, and are both enclaves of Tamil Nadu. Yanam and Mahé are enclaves of Andhra Pradesh and Kerala, respectively. Its population, as per the 2011 Census, is 1,394,467. Puducherry is the smallest union territory in terms of sea coastline with 30.6 km length.

Some of Puducherry's regions are themselves amalgamations of non-contiguous enclaves, often called "pockets" in India. The Puducherry region is made of 11 such pockets, some of which are very small and entirely surrounded by the territory of Tamil Nadu. Mahé region is made up of three pockets. This unusual geography is a legacy of the colonial period with Puducherry retaining the borders of former French India.

All four regions of Puducherry are located in the coastal region. Five rivers in Puducherry district, seven in Karaikal district, two in Mahé district and one in Yanam district drain into the sea, but none originates within the territory.

== Districts ==
- Pondicherry district is an enclave of Tamil Nadu, also serves as the capital of Union Territory of Puducherry.
- Karaikal district is an enclave of Tamil Nadu.
- Mahé district is an enclave of Kerala.
- Yanam district is an enclave of Andhra Pradesh.

== Demographics ==
Historical population
Year	Pop.	±% p.a.
1901	246,354	—
1911	257,179	+0.43%
1921	244,156	−0.52%
1931	258,628	+0.58%
1941	285,011	+0.98%
1951	317,253	+1.08%
1961	369,079	+1.52%
1971	471,707	+2.48%
1981	604,471	+2.51%
1991	807,785	+2.94%
2001	974,345	+1.89%
2011	1,247,953	+2.51%
2021	1,691,969	+3.09%

Religion in Puducherry
1. Hinduism (87.3%)
2. Christianity (6.30%)
3. Islam (6.10%)
4. Others (0.40%)

According to the 2011 census, Hinduism is the major religion, adhered to by 87.3% of the population. Other religions practiced in the territory include Christianity (6.3%) and Islam (6.1%).

Language in Puducherry
1. Tamil (88.2%)
2. Telugu (5.96%)
3. Malayalam (3.84%)
4. Others (1.98%)

According to the 2011 census, Tamil is the major language spoken by 88.22% of the population. Other languages spoken in the territory include Telugu (5.96%) and Malayalam (3.84%).

== Government and administration ==
Puducherry Assembly seats

Puducherry is a union territory of India rather than a state, which implies that governance and administration fall directly under federal authority. It is one of three union territories (with the National Capital Territory of Delhi and Jammu and Kashmir) entitled by a special constitutional amendment to an elected legislative assembly and cabinet of ministers, thereby conveying partial statehood. There has been some interest by the territory's government in receiving full statehood, but budgetary issues remain a consideration. Also, Mahe and Yanam may oppose such a change of status.

The central government is represented by the Lieutenant Governor, who resides at the Raj Nivas (Le Palais du Gouverneur) at the Park, the former palace of the French governor. The central government is more directly involved in the territory's financial well-being unlike states, which have a central grant that they administer. Consequently, Puducherry has at various times, enjoyed lower taxes, especially in the indirect category.

=== Special administration status ===
According to the Treaty of Cession of 1956, the four territories of former French India territorial administration are permitted to make laws with respect to specific matters. In many cases, such legislation may require ratification from the federal government or the assent of the President of India.

Article II of the Treaty states:

Ces établissements conserveront le bénéfice du statut administratif spécial en vigueur avant le 1er novembre 1954. Toute modification constitutionnelle à ce statut ne pourra intervenir, le cas échéant, qu'après consultation de la population.
(The Establishments will keep the benefit of the special administrative status which was in force prior to 1 November 1954. Any constitutional changes in this status which may be made subsequently shall be made after ascertaining the wishes of the people).

=== Languages ===
The most widely spoken first language is Tamil, which is native to 88.2% of the population. There are also speakers of Telugu (6.0%), Malayalam (3.8%) and Urdu (0.7%). The official languages of Puducherry are French, Tamil, Telugu (in Yanam), Malayalam (in Mahe) and English. An official mention in Rajya Sabha Parliamentary debates during 2006 confirms that Puducherry has all these five languages as official.

Distribution of languages in Union Territory of Puducherry (2011)
1. Tamil (88.2%)
2. Telugu (5.96%)
3. Malayalam (3.84%)
4. Others (1.98%)

==== Continuation of French ====
Even after the de facto transfer of the French Indian settlements in November 1954, French continued to remain as the official language according to Article XXVIII of the Traité de Cession (Treaty of Cession) of 1956.

Article XXVIII of the Treaty states:

Le français restera langue officielle des Établissements aussi longtemps que les répresentants élus de la population n'auront pas pris une décision différente.
(The French language shall remain the official language of the Establishments so long as the elected representatives of the people shall not decide otherwise).

The 1963 Pondicherry representative assembly resolution also voted for continuance of French as official language and addition of other languages spoken in Puducherry such as Tamil, Telugu and Malayalam along with English and Hindi.

==== Inclusion of other languages ====
Considering the 1956 Treaty of cession and 1963 Assembly resolution, the 1963 Union Territories Act reconfirmed the 1963 resolution that French shall continue to be used as an official language unless the legislative assembly decides otherwise. The 1963 act allowed provision for inclusion of more official languages. Two years later, new official languages were recognised by The Pondicherry Official Language Act, 1965 which makes no mention of French (but also not officially denying it) implying the implicit continuation of its official language status. The same act stated that the Tamil language shall be the language to be used for all or any of the official purposes of the Union territory and the same official recognition is given for English. The same act also recognized officially Malayalam and Telugu in the Mahé and Yanam districts respectively.

The widespread anti-Hindi agitations in the mid-1960s in South India would have prompted for inclusion of all the languages suggested in the 1963 assembly resolution except Hindi in the list of official languages of Puducherry. While the Union Territory official gazette's name is in French (La Gazette de L'État de Poudouchéry), it is published exclusively in English.

=== Judiciary ===
The jurisdiction of the Madras High Court has been extended to Pondicherry with effect from 6 November 1962. The Chief Justice of the Madras High Court is the head of the judiciary of Puducherry. The present chief justice is S. V. Gangapurwala.

== Economy ==
The gross domestic product of Puducherry, at market prices estimated by the Ministry of Statistics and Programme Implementation with figures in millions of Indian rupees grew from 1,840 to 258,190 million rupees from 1980 to 2014.

Year	Gross domestic product
1980	1,840
1985	3,420
1990	6,030
1995	13,200
2000	37,810
2010	130,920
2014	258,190

=== Fisheries ===
The potential for fisheries is substantial in the Union Territory. The four regions of the Union Territory have a coastline of 45 km with 675 of inshore waters, 1.347 hectares (3.33 acres) of inland water and 800 ha of brackish water. 27 marine fishing villages and 23 inland fishing villages host a fishermen population of about 65,000 of which 13,000 are actively engaged in fishing. Tanks and ponds are also tapped for commercial fish rearing.

=== Tourism ===
Puducherry is one of the most popular tourist spots in India for national and international tourists. Puducherry was the residence of Sri Aurobindo (1872–1950) and the Sri Aurobindo Ashram still operates from Puducherry. A unique experimental city Auroville, the brainchild of the Mother, whose inhabitants are drawn from all parts of the world is situated on the outskirts of the city. There are several temples, churches, monuments, parks, and mosques which attract tourists.

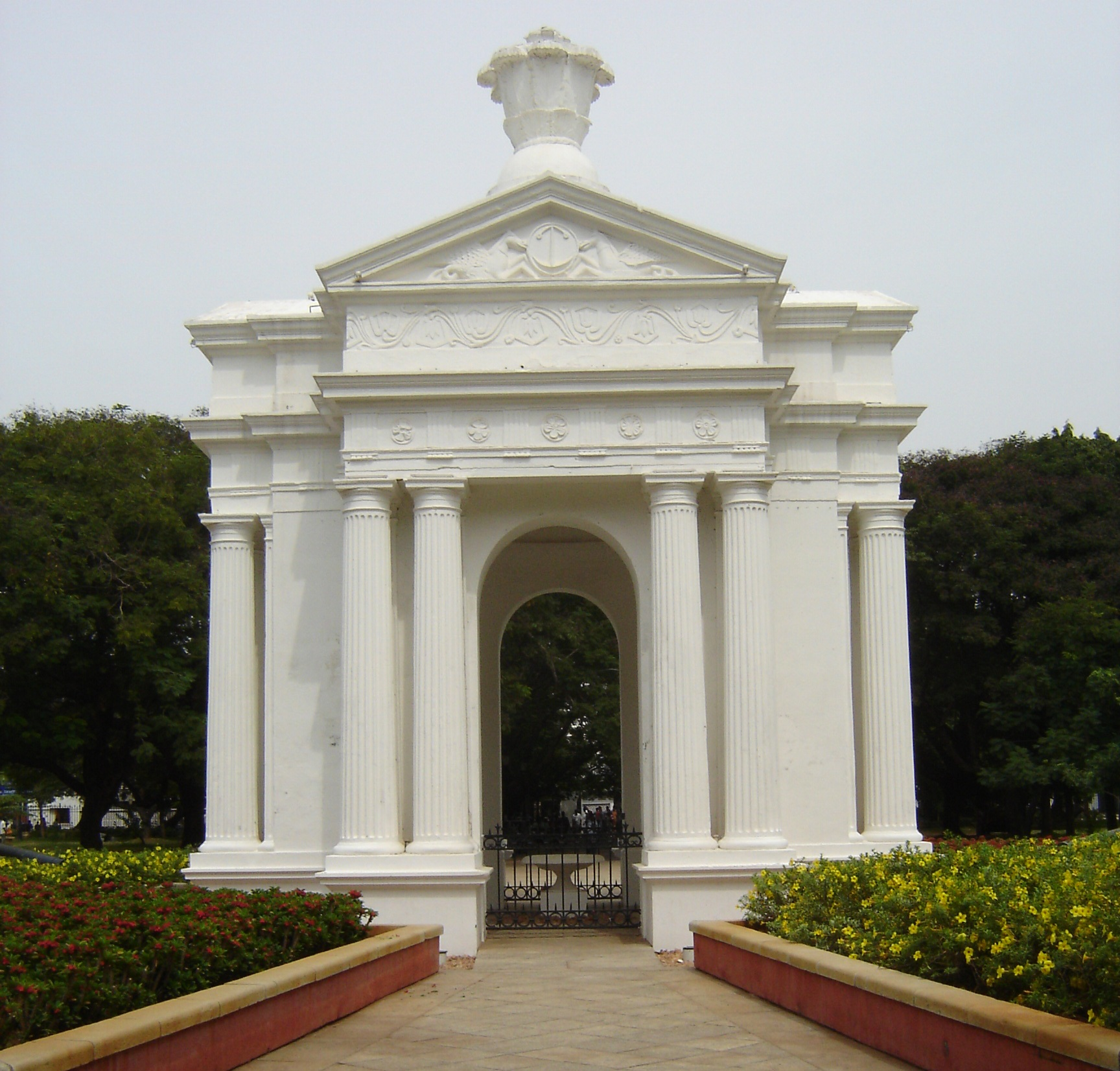
Aayi Mandapam (monument)

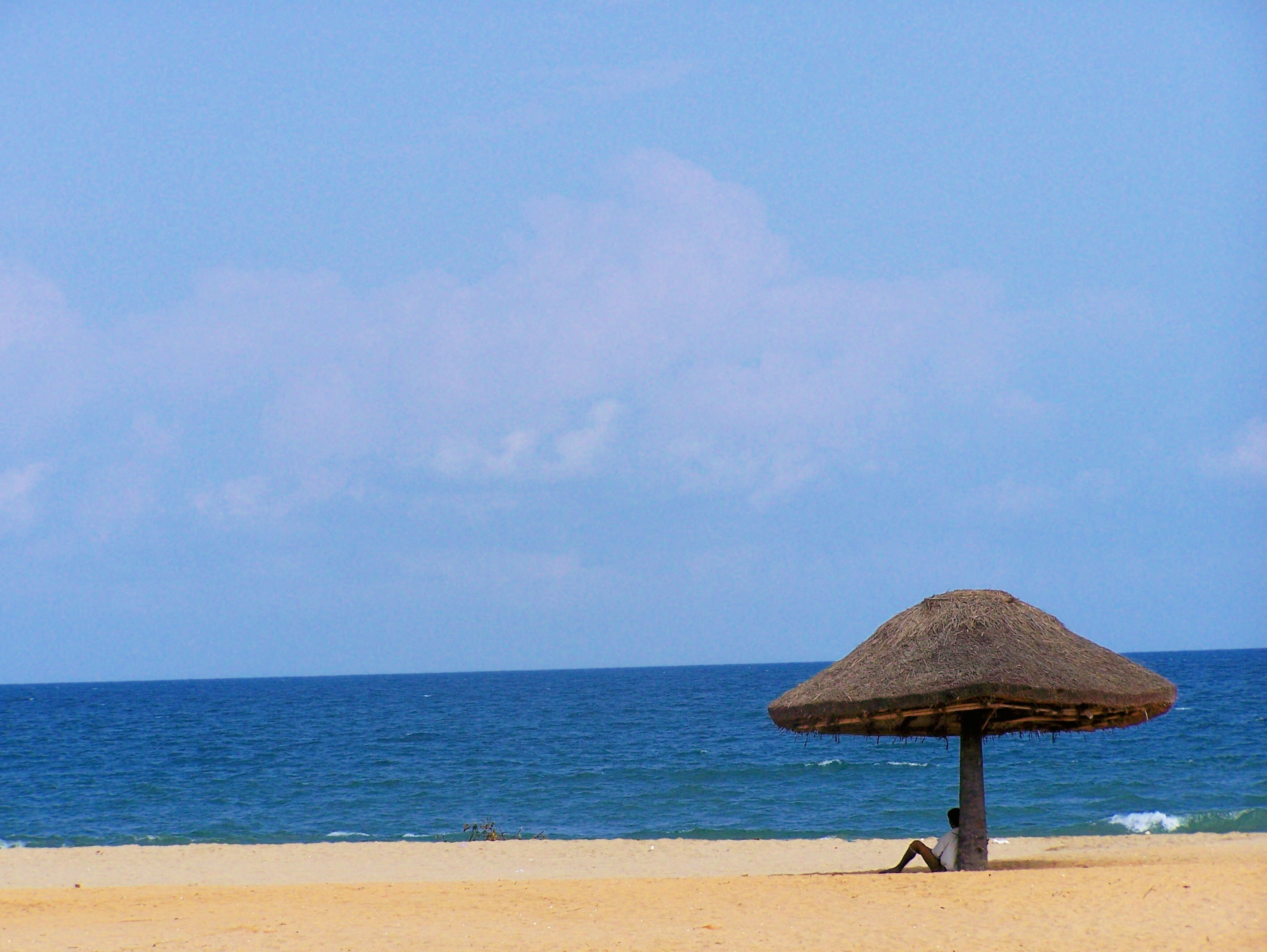
Puducherry Coast view

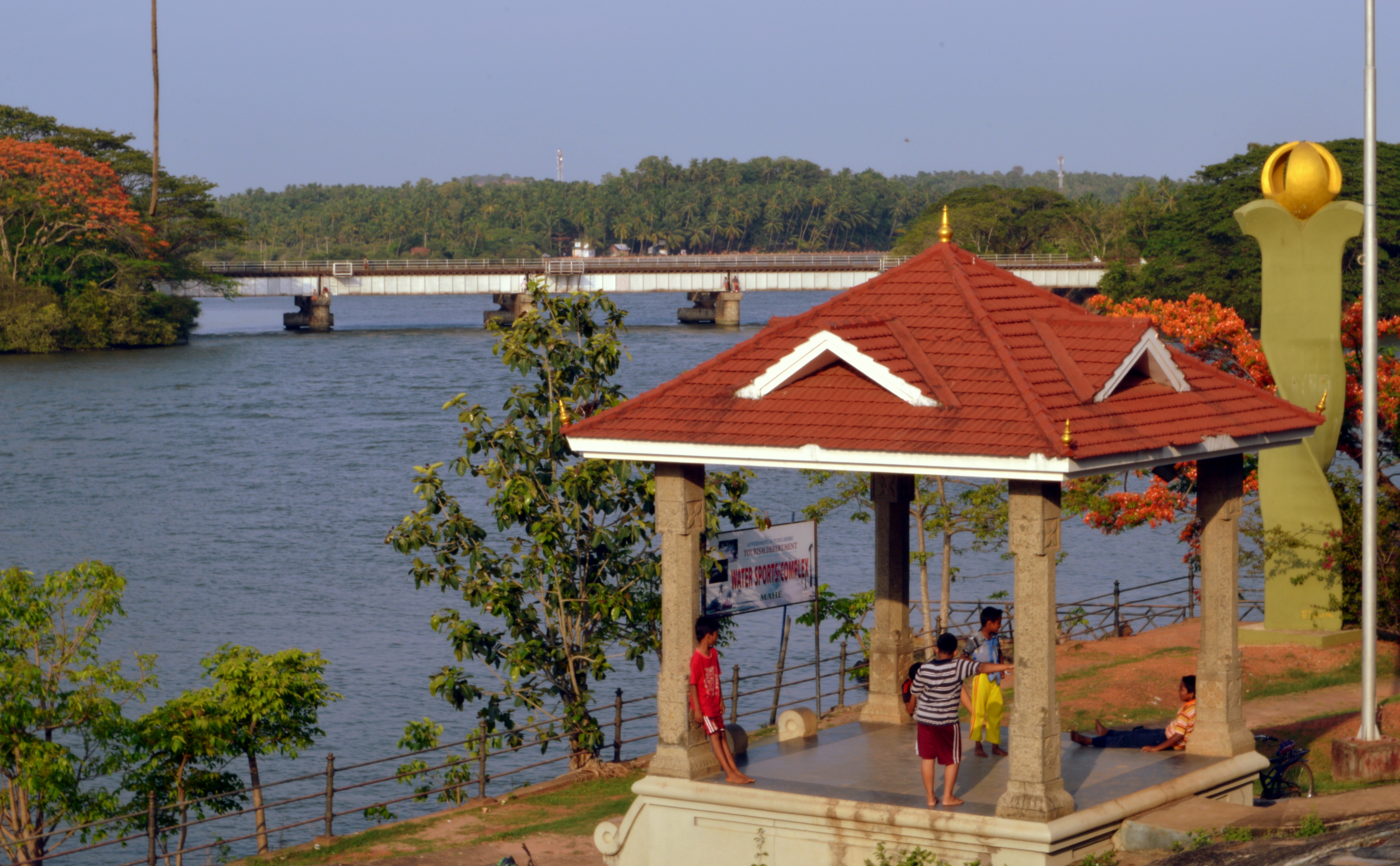
Mahe riverside

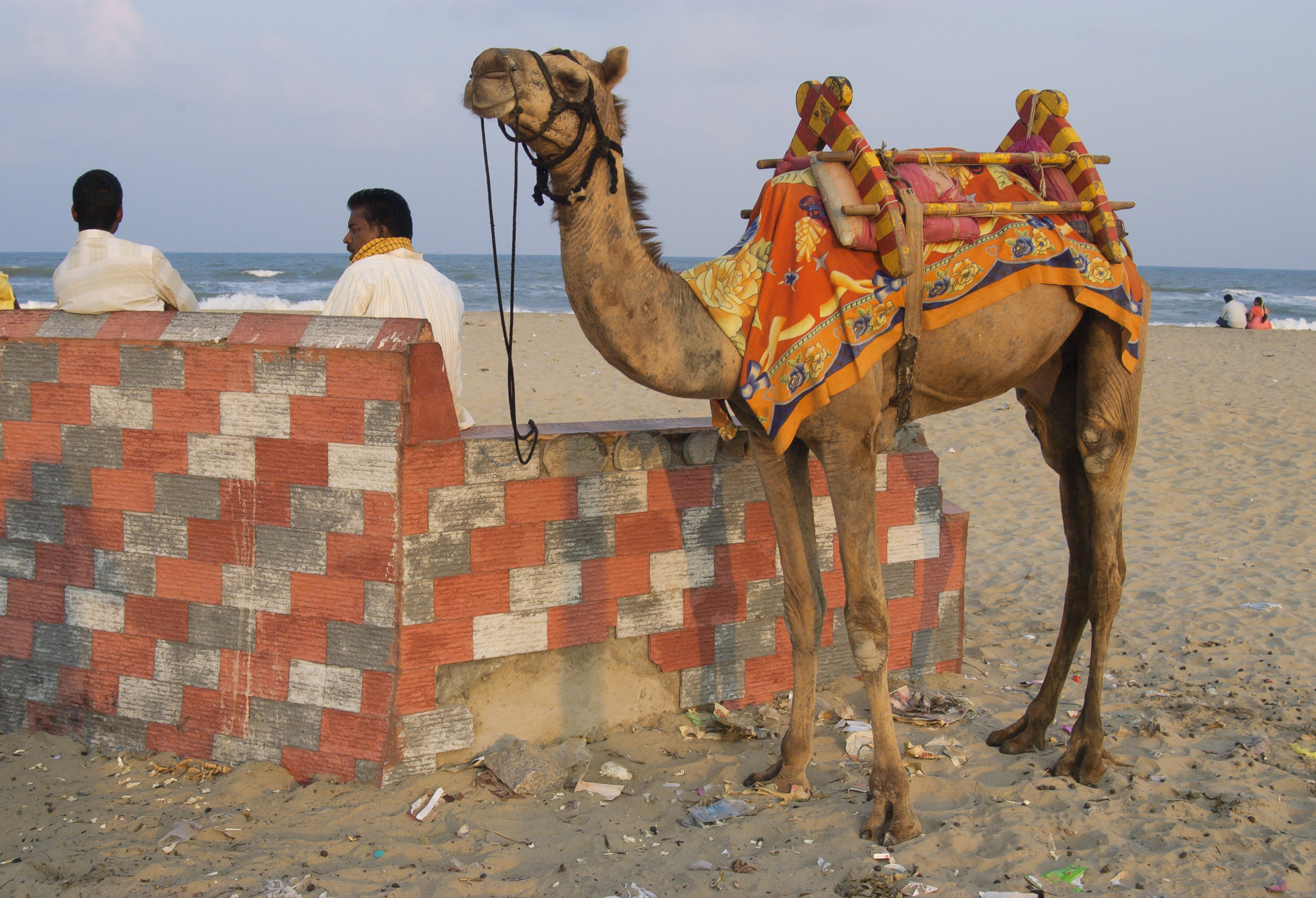
A camel on the beach in Puducherry, India

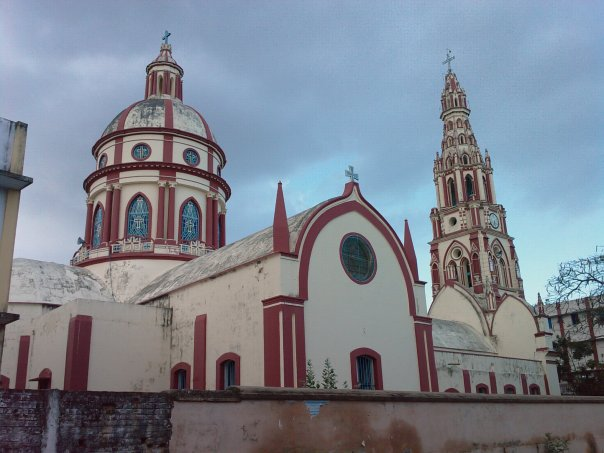
Karaikal church

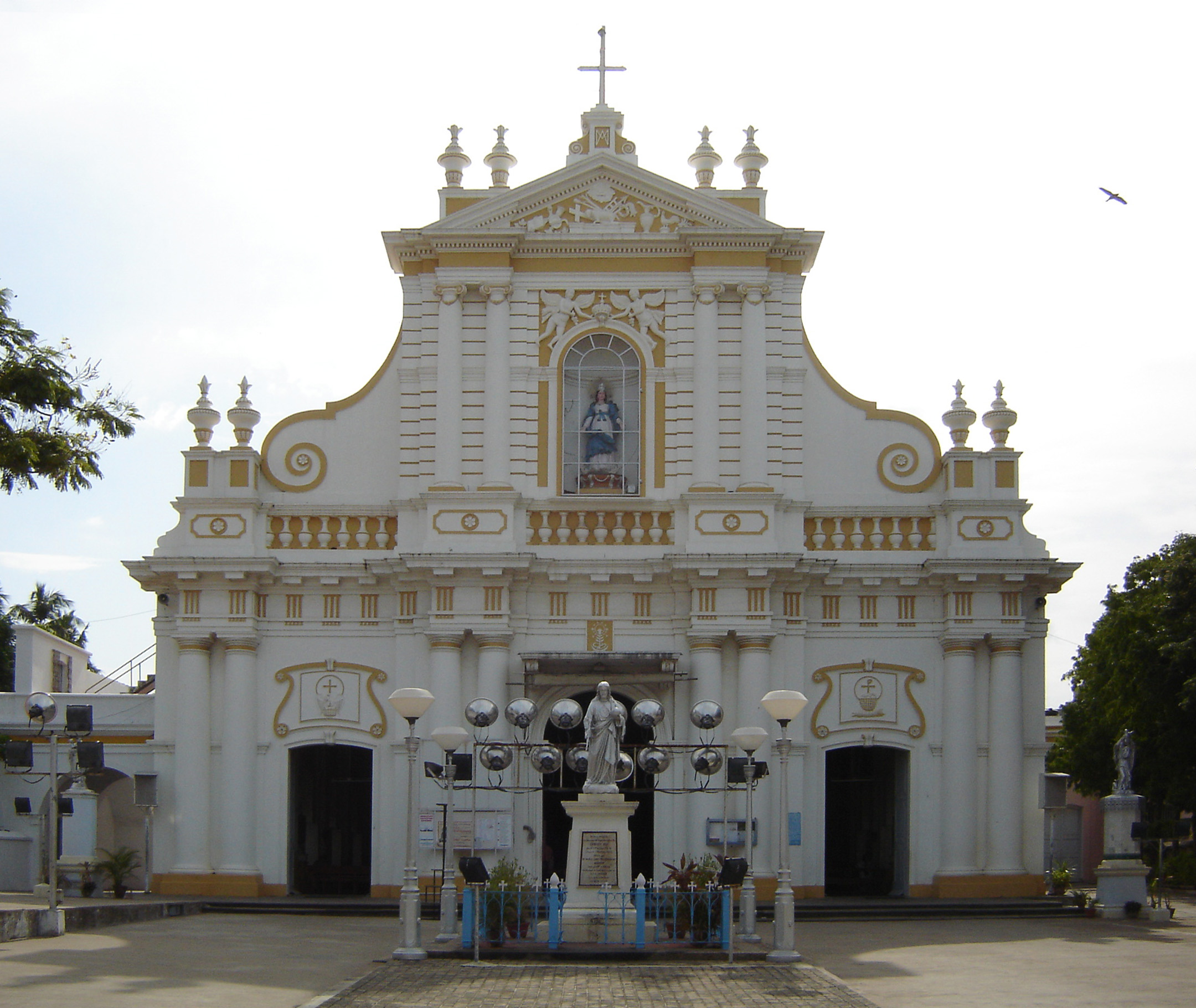
Immaculate Conception Cathedral

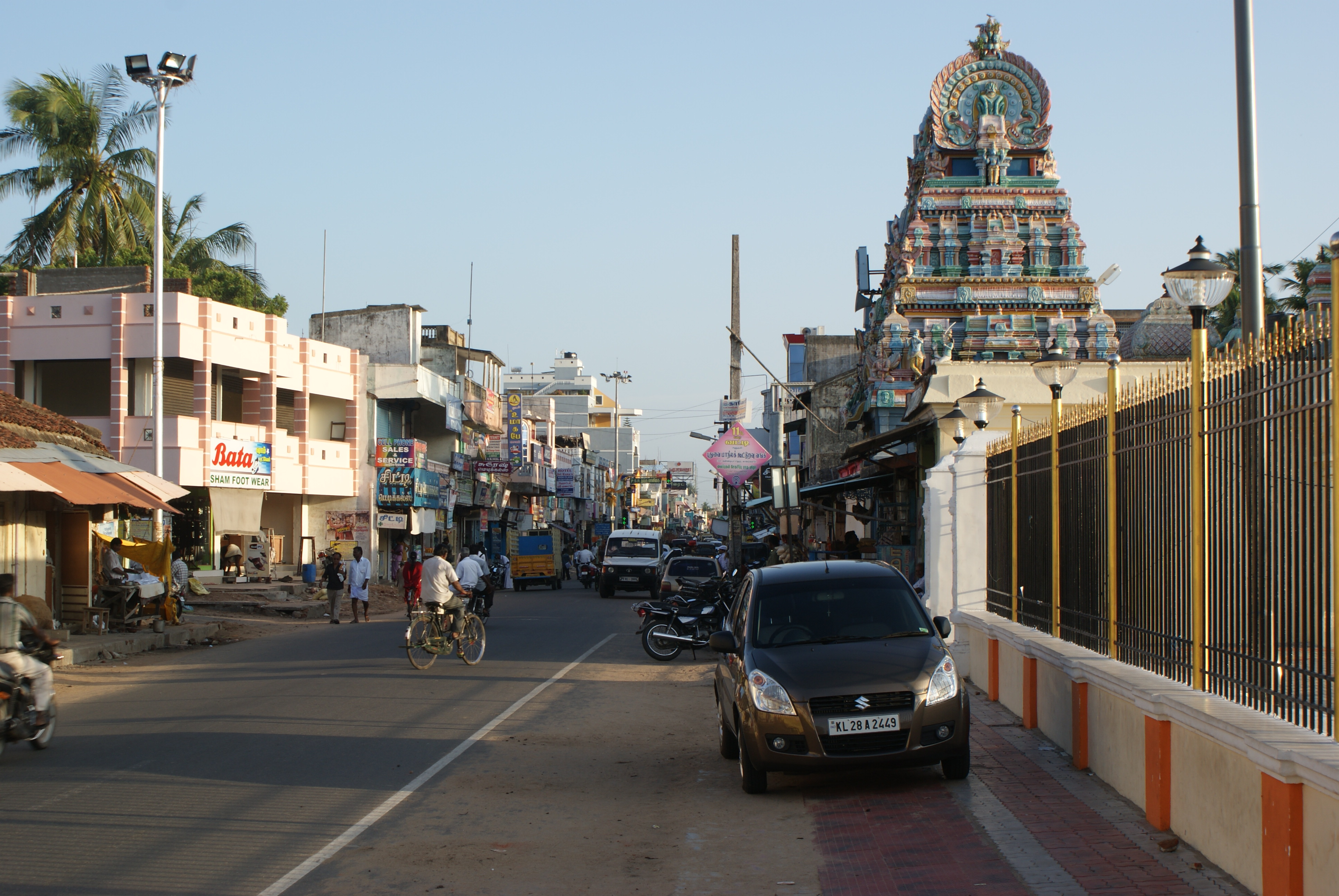
Downtown Karaikal

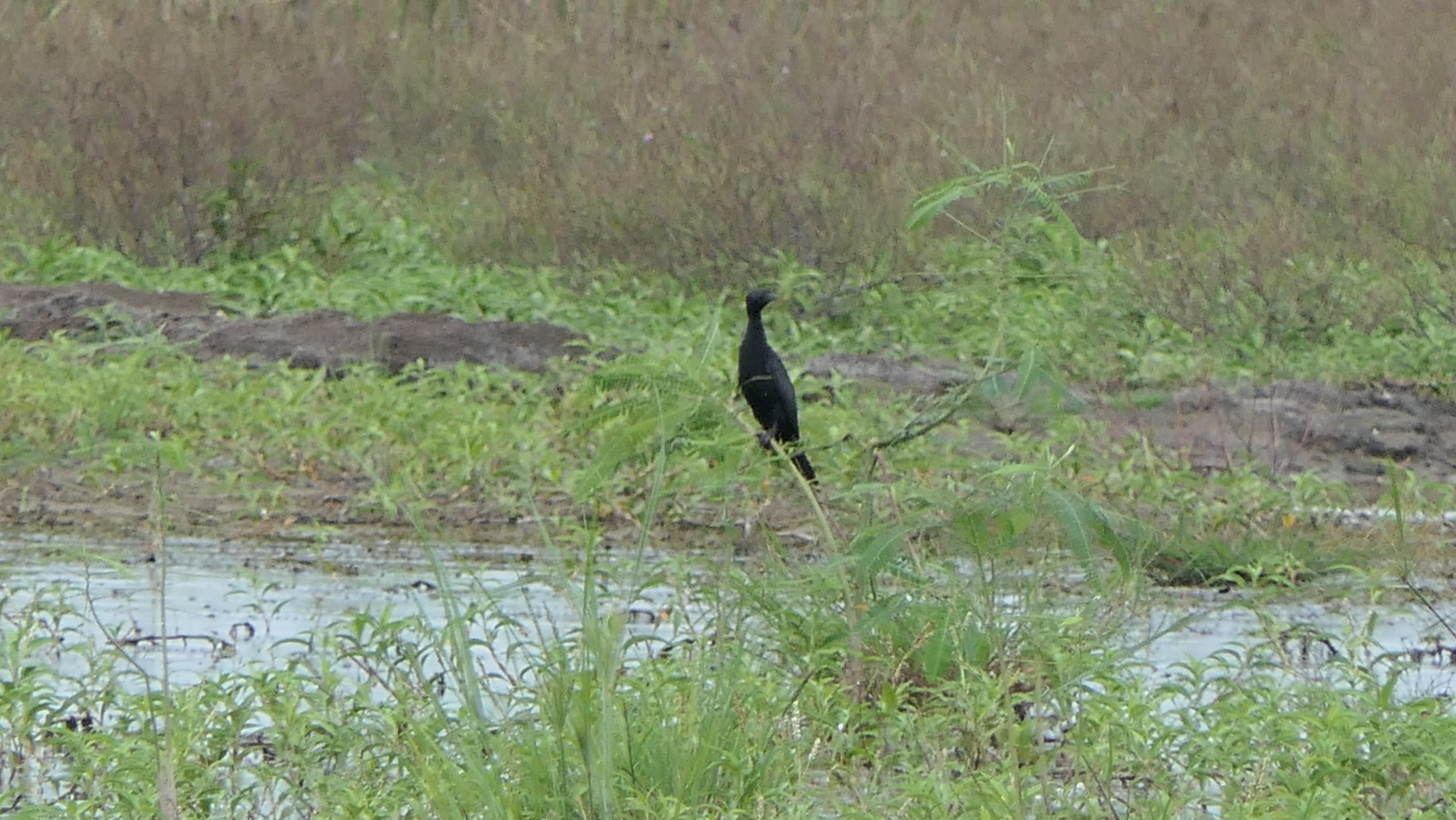
Oussudu Bird Sanctuary

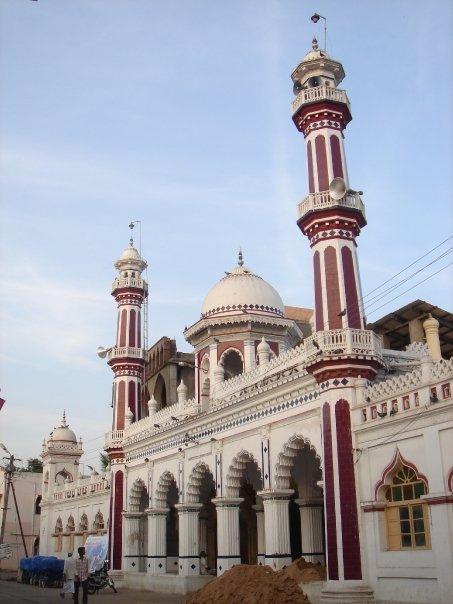
Karaikal Periyapalli

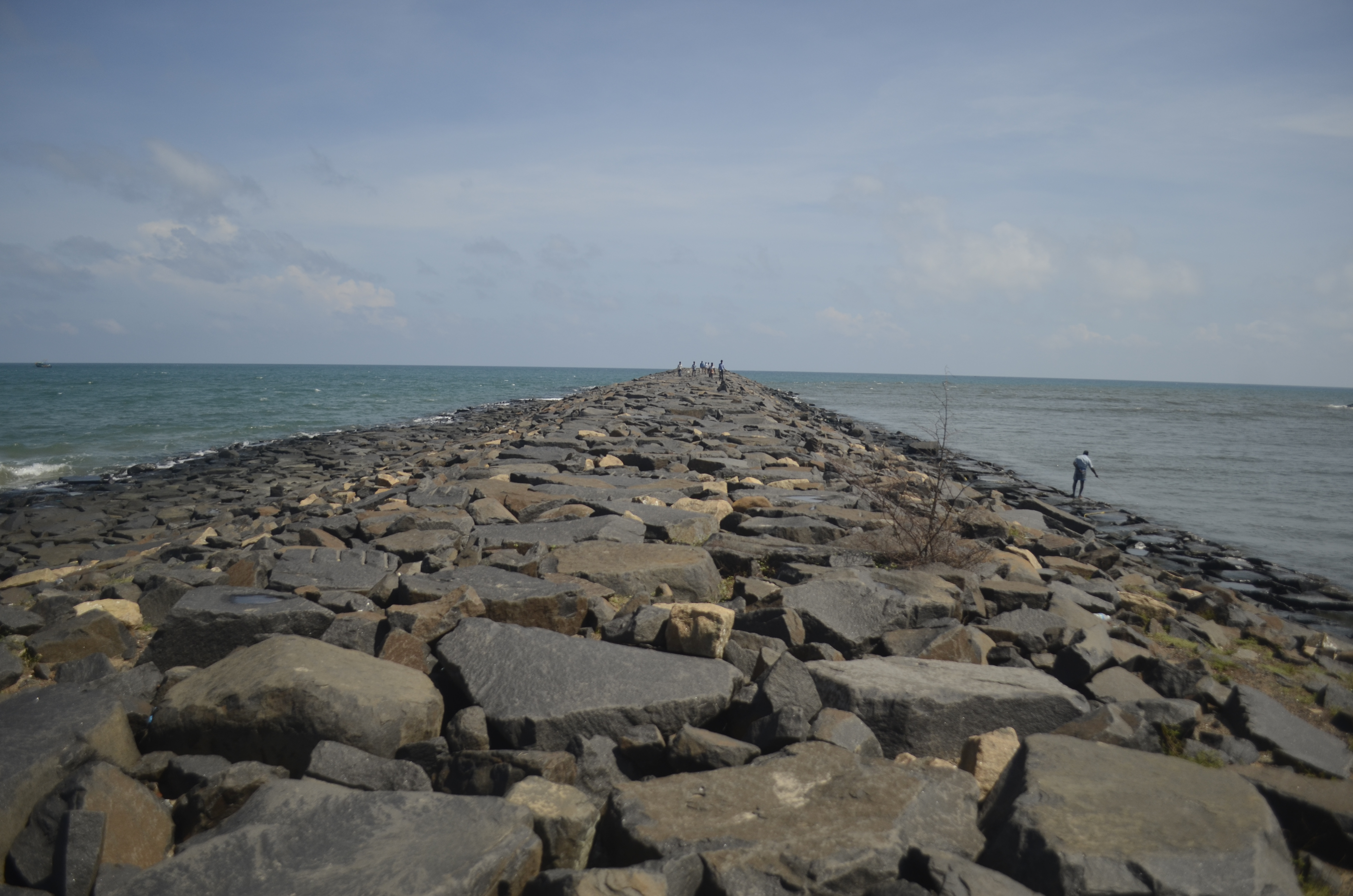
Karaikal Beach

== Transportation ==
=== Rail ===
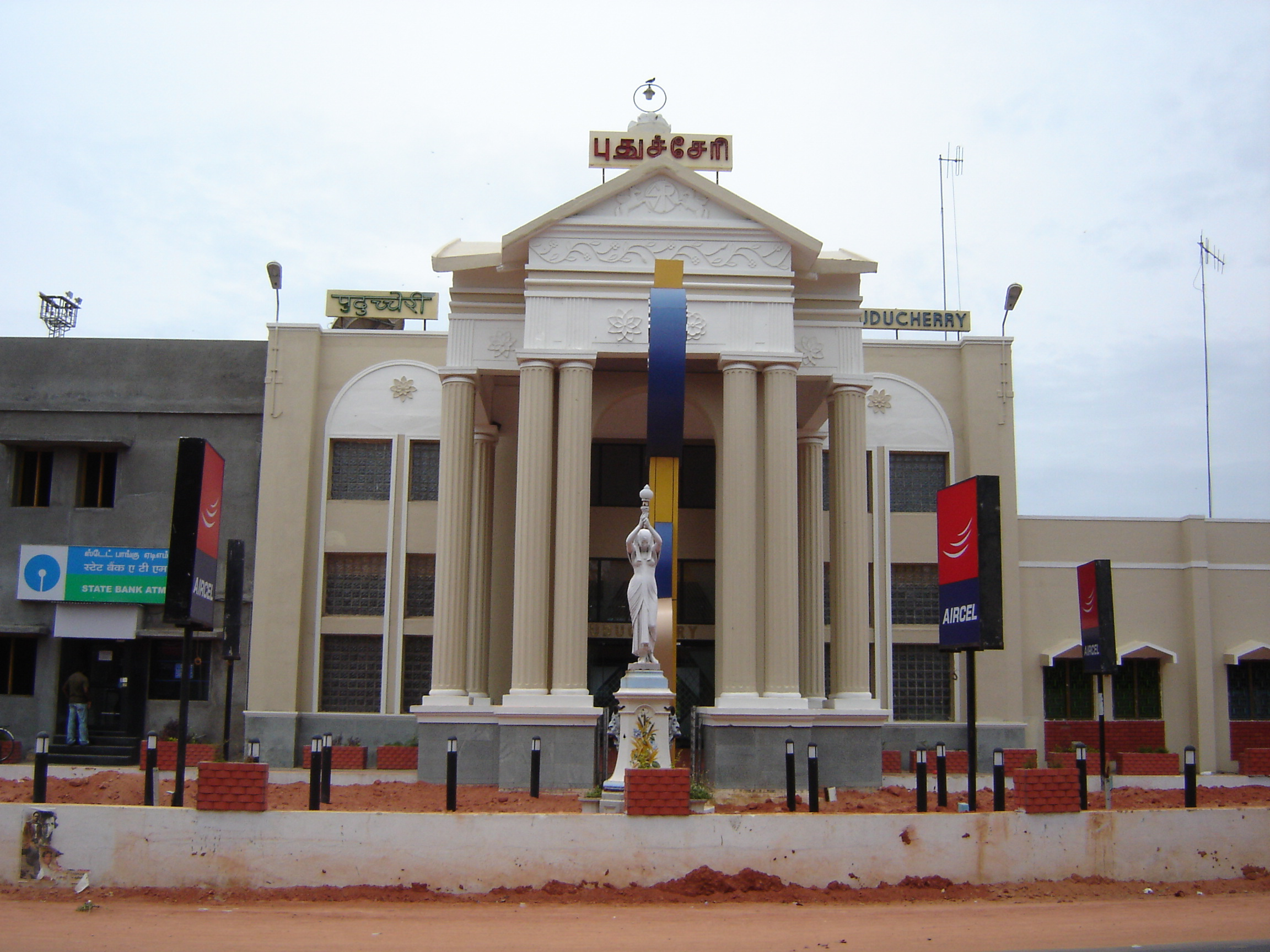
Puducherry railway station

Puducherry is connected by a railway branch line from the five-way junction at Viluppuram and Chennai. The railway line is a broad gauge line with 16 originating trains and 17 terminating trains.

Meanwhile Karaikal and Mahe also well connected by railway lines. Several railway lines are also under construction in Karaikal district. The nearest major railway station to Yanam is Kakinada (CCT) in Andhra Pradesh (33 KM).

=== Air ===
Puducherry has an airport called Puducherry Airport. It has flight operations between Puducherry and Hyderabad. A new airport is proposed in Karaikal which is called as Karaikal Airport. The nearest airport to Yanam is Rajahmundry Airport (IATA: RJA, ICAO: VORY), 90 KM away.

=== Sea ===
Puducherry U.T. has several ports namely Karaikal port, Puducherry port, Mahe port. Among them, the largest port is Karaikal Port.

=== Road ===
Puducherry has a network all-weather metalled roads connecting the territory. Puducherry has a road length of 2,552 km (road length per 4.87 km^{2}), the highest in the country. PRTC buses play a vital role in Puducherry U.T.

Road length comparison with Tamil Nadu and India as a whole
Total road length (in Puducherry)			2,552 km
Road length per 1000 km^{2}	Puducherry	Tamil Nadu	India
Road length per 1000 km^{2}	4,575	1,572	663

Classification of roads
Type of road	Length (km)
National highways	64.450
State highways	49.304
District and other roads: Puducherry– 173.384; Karaikal– 55.162; Mahé– 19.622; Yanam– 26.460	274.628
Rural roads: Puducherry–164.964; Karaikal– 83.470	248.434
Total length	636.816

== Education ==
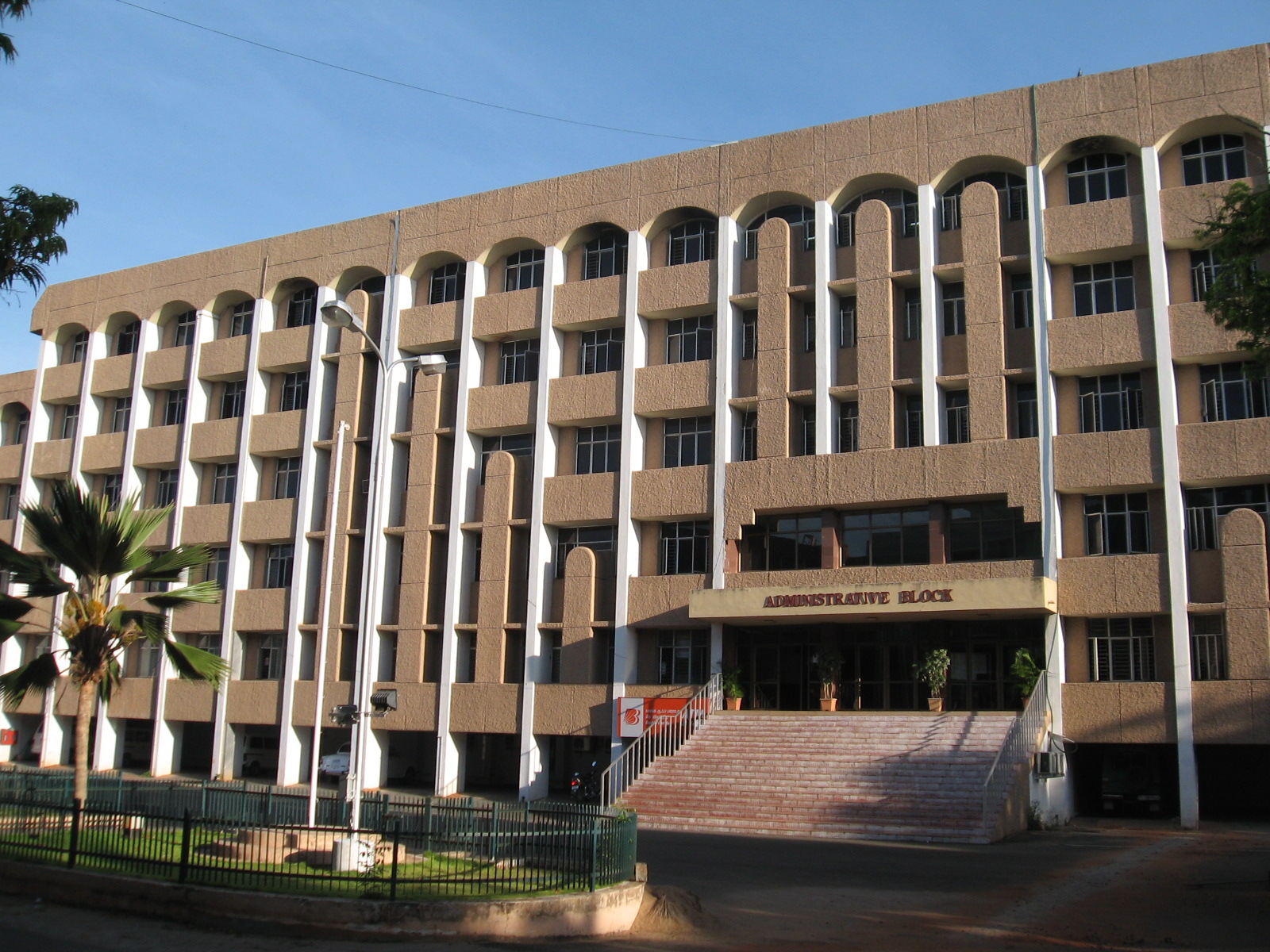
Jawaharlal Institute of Postgraduate Medical Education & Research

According to the 2011 census, Puducherry had a literacy rate of 86.55. Pondicherry University is a university centrally located in Puducherry.

== In popular culture ==
- Lee Langley's novel A House in Pondicherry (1996) was set there.
- Prince Pondicherry is an Indian character from Roald Dahl's children's novel Charlie and the Chocolate Factory (1964). The prince orders Willy Wonka to build a palace of chocolate in India; the palace melts in the hot sun.

=== Films ===
- Puducherry was the setting for Yann Martel's first third of his Booker Prize-winning novel Life of Pi (2001). A portion of the subsequent film adaptation was filmed there.
- Tamil film Ko
- Marathi film Pondicherry

== Tourism ==
Pondicherry is the capital city of The Union Territory of Puducherry and is one of the most popular tourist destinations in South India. A French colony until 1954, its old town retains a number of colonial architecture buildings, churches, statues, and systematic town planning, as well great influences from the local Tamil architecture. Due to its coastal situation, this town offers a vast array of watersport events and watersport based tourism such as boating, kayaking, etc.

=== Tourism in Karaikal ===
Thirunallar Temple

The Dharbaranyeswarar Temple, popularly known as Tirunallar Saniswaran Temple, is one of the Navagraha shrines of Tanjore. This Hindu temple dedicated to the deities Shiva and Shani (Saturn), is located in the Thirunallar commune of Karaikal district.

=== Tourism in Mahe ===
Mooppenkunnu (Hillock) The Mooppenkunnu is a Hillock. It is a Heritage picnic spot situated in Mahé district. The hillock contains the historic Light House and has a sunset view point. Walkway

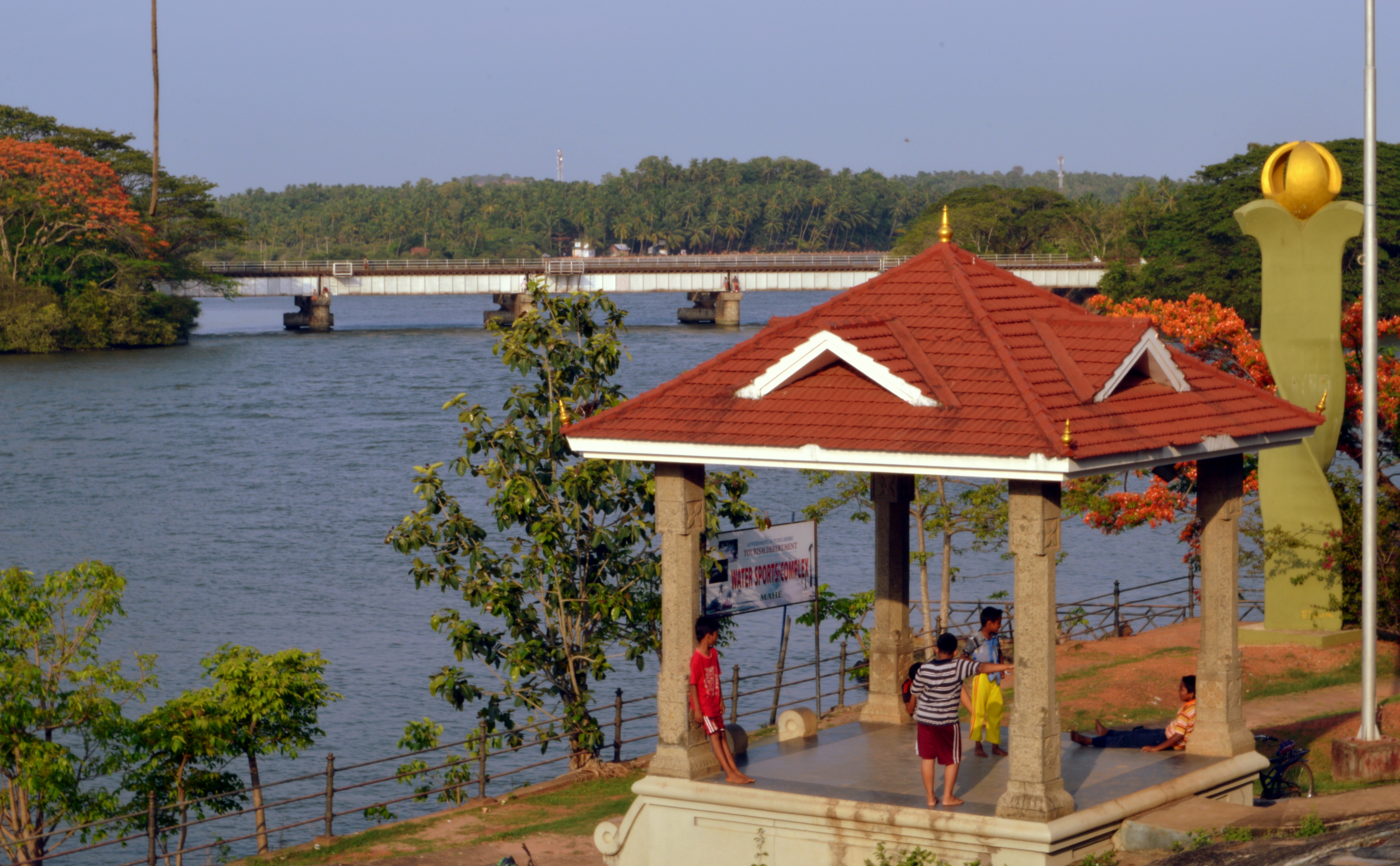

The walkway is located on the banks of Mahé River is one of the major tourist attraction of the district. The walkway surrounds around the landscape of the Mahé town. Azhimukham Azhimukham is the estuary of Mahé River and the Arabian Sea. It consists of Tagore Park and a 2 km walkway along the bank of river from the estuary towards Mahé Bridge.

== Notable people ==
- M. Night Shyamalan from Mahe.
- Michilotte Madhavan from Mahe.

== See also ==
- Puducherry (Lok Sabha constituency)
- Puducherry Legislative Assembly
- Chandannagar
- Compagnie des Indes
- French colonial empire
- Municipal Administration in French India
