= Treaty establishing De Jure Cession of French Establishments in India =

1956 treaty between France and India

The Treaty establishing De Jure Cession of French Establishments in India (French: Traité de cession des Établissements français de Pondichéry, Karikal, Mahé et Yanaon) was a treaty signed between France and India in 1956 that ceded French territories in India to the Republic of India.

== Background ==
By 1954, it became clear that the fate of the French establishments were at the whim of the government of the Republic of India, which desired a united India within a short period of time.

=== History and context of the transfer ===
On November 1, 1954, the French settlements of Pondicherry (Puducherry), Karaikal, Mahe and Yanam were transferred to the Indian Government, following a referendum in Kizhur (this day is referred to as the de facto Merger Day). The referendum was held by the French authorities on October 18, 1954; 170 out of 178 members of the Representative Council voted to join the Indian Union. "About four lakh families wanted to join India, councillors were asked to cast their votes to come to a final decision".

The de jure cession of the Establishments to India was handled by a treaty signed in May 1956. Finally, the Instruments of Ratification of Treaty of Cession between India and France in respect of the settlements were exchanged on August 16, 1962.

The transitional period of eight years was used for “sorting out interests in the former colony” per a book called Pondicherry that was once French India written by historian Raphael Malangin. Prior to the transfer of the four remaining territories, Chandernagore (Chandannagar) was returned to India via a referendum in 1949. It was S. Rangasamy Naicker in Karaikal who continued Gandhi’s freedom campaign in Pondicherry and the enclaves. “A significant role was played by V. Subbiah of the Communist Party in demanding independence of Indian settlements, while V.K. Krishna Menon was a principal instrument in the reunification of Pondicherry with independent India”.

Following the result of the referendum, the Cession treaty was signed by Stanislas Ostroróg (representing France) and Jawaharlal Nehru (representing India) on May 28, 1956.

== Details ==
The official treaty was written in two languages, English and French. The treaty has 31 articles, with an attached protocol/annex containing an additional 9 articles covering Nettapacom, Trubuvane, Yanam and Mahe as well as educational institutions and buildings that remain in French ownership. Residents covered by the treaty were given options to choose concerning their citizenship; most would become Indian citizens after the transfer, but were given the option to retain French citizenship. French citizens born in the Establishments but living abroad would retain their French citizenship. Other articles cover the civil service, historical and judicial archives, pensions and recognition of educational degrees. French nationals were allowed to transfer their property to France free of charge for a period of 10 years after the signing. Articles 21, 22, 23, 24 and 28 contain linguistic provisions; notably article 28 indicates that the French language would remain the official language of the Establishments until the population voted otherwise.

The treaty was ratified by France on August 16, 1962, and published in the Official Journal of the Republic on October 23, 1962

== Legacy ==
De Jure Day, marking the "de jure" transfer, was celebrated for the first time by the government on August 16, 2016 (it was a public holiday before this date with no official celebrations taking place before 2016).
