= Yanam district =

- District of Puducherry
- Interactive map of Yanam district
- Coordinates: 16°44′2″N 82°12′39″E
- Country: India
- Union Territory: Puducherry

Population (2011)
  - Total: 55,626

Languages
  - Official: Telugu
  - Additional: English, French
- Time zone: UTC+5:30 (IST)
- Website: yanam.gov.in

Yanam district (Telugu: [jaːnaːm]) (previously Yanaon, (French: [janaɔ̃])) is one of the four districts and major enclaves of the Union Territory of Puducherry in India. It is completely surrounded by the state of Andhra Pradesh.

== Geography ==
Yanam district occupies an area of 20 square kilometres (7.7 sq mi),

It is located south of Kakinada port on the north bank of Godavari river, slightly inland. It is bordered and surrounded by Konaseema district on South and Kakinada district on north (Districts of Andhra State)

== Revenue villages ==
Apart from the town of Yanam itself, the following villages fall under the district's jurisdiction:

- Agraharam
- Darialatippa
- Farampeta
- Francetippa
- Guerempeta
- Kanakalapeta
- Kurasampeta
- Mettakur

== Demographics ==
According to the 2011 census Yanam district has a population of 55,626, roughly equal to the island of Greenland. This gives it a ranking of 629th in India (out of a total of 640). The district has a population density of 3,272 inhabitants per square kilometre (8,470/sq mi). Its population growth rate over the decade 2001-2011 was 77.15%. Yanam has a sex ratio of 1039 females for every 1000 males, and a literacy rate of 80.26%.

=== Religion ===
Religion in Yanam district (2011)
1. Hinduism (96.2%)
2. Islam (2.14%)
3. Christianity (1.57%)
4. Others (0.05%)

According to the official 2011 census database, Hinduism is the major religion practiced in Yanam district, comprising 96.24% of the population. Muslims form a small religious minority at 2.14%, followed closely by Christians who make up 1.57% of the inhabitants. Other groups, including Sikhs, Jains, and non-religious individuals, make up less than 0.05% combined.

=== Language ===
Languages in Yanam district (2011)
1. Telugu (97.4%)
2. Tamil (1.25%)
3. Others (1.32%)

As a geographical enclave entirely situated within the state of Andhra Pradesh, Telugu serves as the predominant mother tongue, spoken by 97.43% of the district's population according to the 2011 census. Due to administrative associations within the wider Union Territory structures, a minor Tamil speaking community exists at 1.25%, with the remaining 1.32% composed of minor clusters speaking languages such as Malayalam, Urdu, and Hindi.

== Tourism ==
=== Coringa Wildlife Sanctuary ===
Coringa Wildlife Sanctuary, situated near Kakinada, is a notable ecological gem. It covers an area of around 235 square kilometers and is primarily known for its extensive mangrove forest cover, making it one of the largest stretches of mangroves in the country.

The sanctuary's location along the delta of the Godavari River and the Bay of Bengal gives rise to a fragile ecosystem. The intertwining network of creeks, estuaries, and tidal embankments creates a habitat that supports a wide array of wildlife.

Bird enthusiasts flock to Coringa to witness the rich avian diversity. The sanctuary is a haven for migratory and resident bird species, making it a prime destination for bird-watching. Pelicans, flamingos, herons, and many other waterfowl find refuge here.

Apart from birds, the sanctuary is also home to diverse aquatic species, including various species of fish, crabs, and shrimp, which play a vital role in the local ecosystem.

=== Yanam River Beach Walk Trial ===
The walkway on the banks of Godavari River is a major tourist attraction. The walkway surrounds around the landscape of the Yanam coastal area along the river side. The Walkway has park benches to relax and enjoy the beauty of Godavari River. The walkaway starts at Shivam Bath Statue which goes via Ferry Road where various statues and photoshoot places were present and ends at Yedurlanka Bridge.

=== Yanam Mangrove Forest and Puducherry State Obelisk Tower of Yanam ===
Apart from Coringa Wildlife Sanctuary, Yanam itself has a Mangrove Forest (which is the actual range of Coringa Wildlife Sanctuary in the Yanam District Administrational Area) where all the activities of Coringa National Park can be done. In order to have the Birds View of the Yanam Mangrove Forest, the Yanam Obelisk Tower was constructed here.

The Yanam Obelisk Tower was conceptualised With the sole intention to reflect the special bond of Puducherry and French cultural diversity in Yanam, a special design on the lines of Eiffel Tower in Paris, France was constructed as the "Yanam Tower". The Yanam Obelisk Tower was planned in an area of 18 acres in Giriyampeta village. The height of the Tower is 101.6 metres (333 feet), which is one-third of the actual height of the Eiffel Tower in Paris, France. The Tower weight is about 9125 tons. Foundation is a special bored cast in-situ piling up to 60 metres depth with 2020 cubic metres concrete and with a super structure of 31 metres height holding 1300 cubic metres concrete and 320 metric tons Rebar Steel. The Tower is covered with structural glazing of 2200 sq metres area with a 6mm thick toughened reflective glass. It is constructed with a Design Wind Speed of 216 km/h. The Tourism Department of Puducherry, Government of India has approved and sanctioned its timely share of funds to the tune of Rs.17.21 crores towards the developmental works around the Yanam Tower. The Yanam Tower is expected to bring an overall development in the surrounding villages of Giriyampeta, Savithrinagar etc., with The main intention in taking up of this project is to safeguard the unique blend of French - Telugu culture in Yanam and promote the Tourism sector to help Yanam emerge as a major Tourist destination.

== See also ==
- Yanam (India)
- Yanam Municipality
- Karaikal district
- Mahé district
- Puducherry district
