= Emer Cooke =

Irish pharmacist and director of European Medicines Agency

Executive Director of the European Medicines Agency
- Incumbent
- Assumed office 16 November 2020
- Preceded by: Guido Rasi

Personal details
- Born: 9 April 1961 (age 65)
- Education: Trinity College Dublin

Emer Cooke is an Irish pharmacist and Executive Director of the European Medicines Agency (EMA) since November 2020. She is also the chairperson at the International Coalition of Medicines Regulatory Authorities (ICMRA).

== Education ==
Cooke obtained a pharmacy degree at Trinity College, Dublin, Ireland in 1982, following which she remained at Trinity to complete Master's degrees in Science and in Business Administration

== Career ==
Starting in 1985, she held various positions in the pharmaceutical sector. From 1992 to 1995 and from 1996 to 1998 she worked for the lobbying organisation European Federation of Pharmaceutical Industries and Associations (EFPIA) (Note: The European Federation of Pharmaceutical Industries and Associations (EFPIA) is a trade association and lobbying organisation representing the research-based f industry operating in Europe) as Manager of Scientific and Regulatory Affairs. She was Principal Administrator in the Pharmaceuticals Unit of the European Commission between 1998 and 2002, with responsibility for inspections, international activities and legislative initiatives. Ms Cooke joined EMA on 1 July 2002 where she worked first as Head of Inspections and then as Head of International Affairs. From 2021 she was appointed as Head of Regulation of Medicines and other Health Technologies with the World Health Organization (WHO).

=== EMA executive director ===
In November 2020 Cooke was appointed Executive Director of the EMA, also taking the position of chairperson at the International Coalition of Medicines Regulatory Authorities (ICMRA) at the same time. This was in the context of the midst of the COVID-19 pandemic.

On 16 March 2021, Cooke led an EMA press conference to inform about the ongoing investigation into reports of side-effects related to the Oxford–AstraZeneca COVID-19 vaccine. Cooke said the EMA remains "firmly convinced" that the vaccine benefits outweigh the risks of potential side effects.

Cooke's appointment was criticized in a session of the Austrian Parliament on 1 April 2021 when member of parliament Gerald Hauser claimed a potential conflict of interest between her allowing the vaccine in her regulatory function, while having worked for the very same industry as a lobbyist in the past.
