= Thirunallar taluk =

Coordinates: 10.930°N 79.78°E

Thirunallar taluk is a taluk of Karaikal District, Puducherry, India. The taluk headquarters is located at Thirunallar.

The taluk consists of the following revenue villages:

- Vadamattam
- Kilianur
- Agarakurumbagaram
- Melakasakudy
- Melasuprayapuram
- Pettai
- Sorakudy
- Elyankudi
- Uliapathu
- Sellur
- Thennankudy
- Pandaravadisethur
- Nallambal
- Ambagarathur

It also includes the following commune panchayats.

- Thirunallar
- Nedungadu
