= Biomolecular engineering =

Application of engineering principles to biological molecules

Biomolecular engineering is the application of engineering principles and practices to the purposeful manipulation of molecules of biological origin. Biomolecular engineers integrate knowledge of biological processes with the core knowledge of chemical engineering in order to focus on molecular level solutions to issues and problems in the life sciences related to the environment, agriculture, energy, industry, food production, biotechnology, biomanufacturing, and medicine.

Biomolecular engineers purposefully manipulate carbohydrates, proteins, nucleic acids and lipids within the framework of the relation between their structure (see: nucleic acid structure, carbohydrate chemistry, protein structure,), function (see: protein function) and properties and in relation to applicability to such areas as environmental remediation, crop and livestock production, biofuel cells and biomolecular diagnostics. The thermodynamics and kinetics of molecular recognition in enzymes, antibodies, DNA hybridization, bio-conjugation/bio-immobilization and bioseparations are studied. Attention is also given to the rudiments of engineered biomolecules in cell signaling, cell growth kinetics, biochemical pathway engineering and bioreactor engineering.

== Timeline ==
=== History ===
During World War II, the need for large quantities of penicillin of acceptable quality brought together chemical engineers and microbiologists to focus on penicillin production. This created the right conditions to start a chain of reactions that lead to the creation of the field of biomolecular engineering. Biomolecular engineering was first defined in 1992 by the U.S. National Institutes of Health as research at the interface of chemical engineering and biology with an emphasis at the molecular level". Although first defined as research, biomolecular engineering has since become an academic discipline and a field of engineering practice. Herceptin, a humanized Mab for breast cancer treatment, became the first drug designed by a biomolecular engineering approach and was approved by the U.S. FDA. Also, Biomolecular Engineering was a former name of the journal New Biotechnology.

=== Future ===
Bio-inspired technologies of the future can help explain biomolecular engineering. Looking at the Moore's law "Prediction", in the future quantum and biology-based processors are "big" technologies. With the use of biomolecular engineering, the way our processors work can be manipulated in order to function in the same sense a biological cell work. Biomolecular engineering has the potential to become one of the most important scientific disciplines because of its advancements in the analyses of gene expression patterns as well as the purposeful manipulation of many important biomolecules to improve functionality. Research in this field may lead to new drug discoveries, improved therapies, and advancement in new bioprocess technology. With the increasing knowledge of biomolecules, the rate of finding new high-value molecules including but not limited to antibodies, enzymes, vaccines, and therapeutic peptides will continue to accelerate. Biomolecular engineering will produce new designs for therapeutic drugs and high-value biomolecules for treatment or prevention of cancers, genetic diseases, and other types of metabolic diseases. Also, there is anticipation of industrial enzymes that are engineered to have desirable properties for process improvement as well the manufacturing of high-value biomolecular products at a much lower production cost. Using recombinant technology, new antibiotics that are active against resistant strains will also be produced.

== Basic biomolecules ==
Biomolecular engineering deals with the manipulation of many key biomolecules. These include, but are not limited to, proteins, carbohydrates, nucleic acids, and lipids. These molecules are the basic building blocks of life and by controlling, creating, and manipulating their form and function there are many new avenues and advantages available to society. Since every biomolecule is different, there are a number of techniques used to manipulate each one respectively.

=== Proteins ===
Proteins are polymers that are made up of amino acid chains linked with peptide bonds. They have four distinct levels of structure: primary, secondary, tertiary, and quaternary. Primary structure refers to the amino acid backbone sequence. Secondary structure focuses on minor conformations that develop as a result of the hydrogen bonding between the amino acid chain. If most of the protein contains intermolecular hydrogen bonds it is said to be fibrillar, and the majority of its secondary structure will be beta sheets. However, if the majority of the orientation contains intramolecular hydrogen bonds, then the protein is referred to as globular and mostly consists of alpha helices. There are also conformations that consist of a mix of alpha helices and beta sheets as well as a beta helixes with an alpha sheets.

The tertiary structure of proteins deal with their folding process and how the overall molecule is arranged. Finally, a quaternary structure is a group of tertiary proteins coming together and binding. With all of these levels, proteins have a wide variety of places in which they can be manipulated and adjusted. Techniques are used to affect the amino acid sequence of the protein (site-directed mutagenesis), the folding and conformation of the protein, or the folding of a single tertiary protein within a quaternary protein matrix. Proteins that are the main focus of manipulation are typically enzymes. These are proteins that act as catalysts for biochemical reactions. By manipulating these catalysts, the reaction rates, products, and effects can be controlled. Enzymes and proteins are important to the biological field and research that there are specific divisions of engineering focusing only on proteins and enzymes.

=== Carbohydrates ===
Carbohydrates are another important biomolecule. These are polymers, called polysaccharides, which are made up of chains of simple sugars connected via glycosidic bonds. These monosaccharides consist of a five to six carbon ring that contains carbon, hydrogen, and oxygen - typically in a 1:2:1 ratio, respectively. Common monosaccharides are glucose, fructose, and ribose. When linked together monosaccharides can form disaccharides, oligosaccharides, and polysaccharides: the nomenclature is dependent on the number of monosaccharides linked together. Common dissacharides, two monosaccharides joined, are sucrose, maltose, and lactose. Important polysaccharides, links of many monosaccharides, are cellulose, starch, and chitin.

Cellulose is a polysaccharide made up of beta 1-4 linkages between repeat glucose monomers. It is the most abundant source of sugar in nature and is a major part of the paper industry. Starch is also a polysaccharide made up of glucose monomers; however, they are connected via an alpha 1-4 linkage instead of beta. Starches, particularly amylose (which is degraded by amylase), are important in many industries, including the paper, cosmetic, and food. Chitin is a derivation of cellulose, possessing an acetamide group instead of an –OH on one of its carbons. Acetimide group is deacetylated the polymer chain is then called chitosan. Both of these cellulose derivatives are a major source of research for the biomedical and food industries. They have been shown to assist with blood clotting, have antimicrobial properties, and dietary applications. A lot of engineering and research is focusing on the degree of deacetylation that provides the most effective result for specific applications.

=== Nucleic acids ===
Nucleic acids are macromolecules that consist of DNA and RNA which are biopolymers consisting of chains of biomolecules. These two molecules are the genetic code and template that make life possible. Manipulation of these molecules and structures causes major changes in function and expression of other macromolecules. Nucleosides are glycosylamines containing a nucleobase bound to either ribose or deoxyribose sugar via a beta-glycosidic linkage. The sequence of the bases determine the genetic code. Nucleotides are nucleosides that are phosphorylated by specific kinases via a phosphodiester bond. Nucleotides are the repeating structural units of nucleic acids. The nucleotides are made of a nitrogenous base, a pentose (ribose for RNA or deoxyribose for DNA), and three phosphate groups. See, Site-directed mutagenesis, recombinant DNA, and ELISAs.

=== Lipids ===
Lipids are biomolecules that are made up of glycerol derivatives bonded with fatty acid chains. Glycerol is a simple polyol that has a formula of C_{3}H_{5}(OH)_{3}. Fatty acids are long carbon chains that have a carboxylic acid group at the end. The carbon chains can be either saturated with hydrogen; every carbon bond is occupied by a hydrogen atom or a single bond to another carbon in the carbon chain, or they can be unsaturated; namely, there are double bonds between the carbon atoms in the chain. Common fatty acids include lauric acid, stearic acid, and oleic acid. The study and engineering of lipids typically focuses on the manipulation of lipid membranes and encapsulation. Cellular membranes and other biological membranes typically consist of a phospholipid bilayer membrane, or a derivative thereof. Along with the study of cellular membranes, lipids are also important molecules for energy storage. By utilizing encapsulation properties and thermodynamic characteristics, lipids become significant assets in structure and energy control when engineering molecules.

== Of molecules ==
=== Recombinant DNA ===
Recombinant DNA are DNA biomolecules that contain genetic sequences that are not native to the organism's genome. Using recombinant techniques, it is possible to insert, delete, or alter a DNA sequence precisely without depending on the location of restriction sites. Recombinant DNA is used for a wide range of applications.

==== Method ====
Creating recombinant DNA. After the plasmid is cleaved by restriction enzymes, ligases insert the foreign DNA fragments into the plasmid.

The traditional method for creating recombinant DNA typically involves the use of plasmids in the host bacteria. The plasmid contains a genetic sequence corresponding to the recognition site of a restriction endonuclease, such as EcoR1. After foreign DNA fragments, which have also been cut with the same restriction endonuclease, have been inserted into host cell, the restriction endonuclease gene is expressed by applying heat, or by introducing a biomolecule, such as arabinose. Upon expression, the enzyme will cleave the plasmid at its corresponding recognition site creating sticky ends on the plasmid. Ligases then joins the sticky ends to the corresponding sticky ends of the foreign DNA fragments creating a recombinant DNA plasmid.

Advances in genetic engineering have made the modification of genes in microbes quite efficient allowing constructs to be made in about a weeks worth of time. It has also made it possible to modify the organism's genome itself. Specifically, use of the genes from the bacteriophage lambda are used in recombination. This mechanism, known as recombineering, utilizes the three proteins Exo, Beta, and Gam, which are created by the genes exo, bet, and gam respectively. Exo is a double stranded DNA exonuclease with 5' to 3' activity. It cuts the double stranded DNA leaving 3' overhangs. Beta is a protein that binds to single stranded DNA and assists homologous recombination by promoting annealing between the homology regions of the inserted DNA and the chromosomal DNA. Gam functions to protect the DNA insert from being destroyed by native nucleases within the cell.

==== Applications ====
Recombinant DNA can be engineered for a wide variety of purposes. The techniques utilized allow for specific modification of genes making it possible to modify any biomolecule. It can be engineered for laboratory purposes, where it can be used to analyze genes in a given organism. In the pharmaceutical industry, proteins can be modified using recombination techniques. Some of these proteins include human insulin. Recombinant insulin is synthesized by inserting the human insulin gene into E. coli, which then produces insulin for human use. Other proteins, such as human growth hormone, factor VIII, and hepatitis B vaccine are produced using similar means. Recombinant DNA can also be used for diagnostic methods involving the use of the ELISA method. This makes it possible to engineer antigens, as well as the enzymes attached, to recognize different substrates or be modified for bioimmobilization. Recombinant DNA is also responsible for many products found in the agricultural industry. Genetically modified food, such as golden rice, has been engineered to have increased production of vitamin A for use in societies and cultures where dietary vitamin A is scarce. Other properties that have been engineered into crops include herbicide-resistance and insect-resistance.

=== Site-directed mutagenesis ===
Site-directed mutagenesis is a technique that has been around since the 1970s. The early days of research in this field yielded discoveries about the potential of certain chemicals such as bisulfite and aminopurine to change certain bases in a gene. This research continued, and other processes were developed to create certain nucleotide sequences on a gene, such as the use of restriction enzymes to fragment certain viral strands and use them as primers for bacterial plasmids. The modern method, developed by Michael Smith in 1978, uses an oligonucleotide that is complementary to a bacterial plasmid with a single base pair mismatch or a series of mismatches.

==== General procedure ====
Site directed mutagenesis is a valuable technique that allows for the replacement of a single base in an oligonucleotide or gene. The basics of this technique involve the preparation of a primer that will be a complementary strand to a wild type bacterial plasmid. This primer will have a base pair mismatch at the site where the replacement is desired. The primer must also be long enough such that the primer will anneal to the wild type plasmid. After the primer anneals, a DNA polymerase will complete the primer. When the bacterial plasmid is replicated, the mutated strand will be replicated as well. The same technique can be used to create a gene insertion or deletion. Often, an antibiotic resistant gene is inserted along with the modification of interest and the bacteria are cultured on an antibiotic medium. The bacteria that were not successfully mutated will not survive on this medium, and the mutated bacteria can easily be cultured.

This animation shows the basic steps of site directed mutagenesis, where X-Y is the desired base pair replacement of T-A.

==== Applications ====
Site-directed mutagenesis can be helpful for many different reasons. A single base-pair replacement will change the codon, potentially replacing an amino acid in a protein. Mutagenesis can help determine the function of proteins and the roles of specific amino acids. If an amino acid near the active site is mutated, the kinetic parameters may change drastically, or the enzyme might behave differently. Another application of site-directed mutagenesis is exchanging an amino acid residue far from the active site with a lysine residue or cysteine residue. These amino acids make it easier to covalently bond the enzyme to a solid surface, which allows for enzyme re-use and the use of enzymes in continuous processes. Sometimes, amino acids with non-natural functional groups (such as an aldehyde introduced through an aldehyde tag) are added to proteins. These additions may be for ease of bioconjugation or to study the effects of amino acid changes on the form and function of the proteins. One example of how mutagenesis is used is found in the coupling of site-directed mutagenesis and PCR to reduce interleukin-6 activity in cancerous cells. In another example, Bacillus subtilis is used in site-directed mutagenesis, to secrete the enzyme subtilisin through the cell wall. Biomolecular engineers can purposely manipulate this gene to essentially make the cell a factory for producing whatever protein the insertion in the gene codes.

=== Bio-immobilization and bio-conjugation ===
Bio-immobilization and bio-conjugation is the purposeful manipulation of a biomolecule's mobility by chemical or physical means to obtain a desired property. Immobilization of biomolecules allows exploiting characteristics of the molecule under controlled environments. For example , the immobilization of glucose oxidase on calcium alginate gel beads can be used in a bioreactor. The resulting product will not need purification to remove the enzyme because it will remain linked to the beads in the column. Examples of types of biomolecules that are immobilized are enzymes, organelles, and complete cells. Biomolecules can be immobilized using a range of techniques. The most popular are physical entrapment, adsorption, and covalent modification.

- Physical entrapment - the use of a polymer to contain the biomolecule in a matrix without chemical modification. Entrapment can be between lattices of polymer, known as gel entrapment, or within micro-cavities of synthetic fibers, known as fiber entrapment. Examples include entrapment of enzymes such as glucose oxidase in gel column for use as a bioreactor. Important characteristic with entrapment is biocatalyst remains structurally unchanged, but creates large diffusion barriers for substrates.
- Adsorption- immobilization of biomolecules due to interaction between the biomolecule and groups on support. Can be physical adsorption, ionic bonding, or metal binding chelation. Such techniques can be performed under mild conditions and relatively simple, although the linkages are highly dependent upon pH, solvent and temperature. Examples include enzyme-linked immunosorbent assays.
- Covalent modification- involves chemical reactions between certain functional groups and matrix. This method forms stable complex between biomolecule and matrix and is suited for mass production. Due to the formation of chemical bond to functional groups, loss of activity can occur. Examples of chemistries used are DCC coupling PDC coupling and EDC/NHS coupling, all of which take advantage of the reactive amines on the biomolecule's surface.

Because immobilization restricts the biomolecule, care must be given to ensure that functionality is not entirely lost. Variables to consider are pH, temperature, solvent choice, ionic strength, orientation of active sites due to conjugation. For enzymes, the conjugation will lower the kinetic rate due to a change in the 3-dimensional structure, so care must be taken to ensure functionality is not lost. Bio-immobilization is used in technologies such as diagnostic bioassays, biosensors, ELISA, and bioseparations. Interleukin (IL-6) can also be bioimmobilized on biosensors. The ability to observe these changes in IL-6 levels is important in diagnosing an illness. A cancer patient will have elevated IL-6 level and monitoring those levels will allow the physician to watch the disease progress. A direct immobilization of IL-6 on the surface of a biosensor offers a fast alternative to ELISA.

=== Polymerase chain reaction ===
Polymerase chain reaction. There are three main steps involved in PCR. In the first step, the double stranded DNA strands are "melted" or denatured forming single stranded DNA. Next, primers, which have been designed to target a specific gene sequence on the DNA, anneal to the single stranded DNA. Lastly, DNA polymerase synthesizes a new DNA strand complementary to the original DNA. These three steps are repeated multiple times until the desired number of copies are made.

The polymerase chain reaction (PCR) is a scientific technique that is used to replicate a piece of a DNA molecule by several orders of magnitude. PCR implements a cycle of repeated heated and cooling known as thermal cycling along with the addition of DNA primers and DNA polymerases to selectively replicate the DNA fragment of interest. The technique was developed by Kary Mullis in 1983 while working for the Cetus Corporation. Mullis would go on to win the Nobel Prize in Chemistry in 1993 as a result of the impact that PCR had in many areas such as DNA cloning, DNA sequencing, and gene analysis.

==== Biomolecular engineering techniques involved in PCR ====
A number of biomolecular engineering strategies have played a very important role in the development and practice of PCR. For instance a crucial step in ensuring the accurate replication of the desired DNA fragment is the creation of the correct DNA primer. The most common method of primer synthesis is by the phosphoramidite method. This method includes the biomolecular engineering of a number of molecules to attain the desired primer sequence. The most prominent biomolecular engineering technique seen in this primer design method is the initial bioimmobilization of a nucleotide to a solid support. This step is commonly done via the formation of a covalent bond between the 3'-hydroxy group of the first nucleotide of the primer and the solid support material.

Furthermore, as the DNA primer is created certain functional groups of nucleotides to be added to the growing primer require blocking to prevent undesired side reactions. This blocking of functional groups as well as the subsequent de-blocking of the groups, coupling of subsequent nucleotides, and eventual cleaving from the solid support are all methods of manipulation of biomolecules that can be attributed to biomolecular engineering. The increase in interleukin levels is directly proportional to the increased death rate in breast cancer patients. PCR paired with Western blotting and ELISA help define the relationship between cancer cells and IL-6.

=== Enzyme-linked immunosorbent assay (ELISA) ===
Enzyme-linked immunosorbent assay is an assay that utilizes the principle of antibody-antigen recognition to test for the presence of certain substances. The three main types of ELISA tests which are indirect ELISA, sandwich ELISA, and competitive ELISA all rely on the fact that antibodies have an affinity for only one specific antigen. Furthermore, these antigens or antibodies can be attached to enzymes which can react to create a colorimetric result indicating the presence of the antibody or antigen of interest. Enzyme linked immunosorbent assays are used most commonly as diagnostic tests to detect HIV antibodies in blood samples to test for HIV, human chorionic gonadotropin molecules in urine to indicate pregnancy, and Mycobacterium tuberculosis antibodies in blood to test patients for tuberculosis. Furthermore, ELISA is also widely used as a toxicology screen to test people's serum for the presence of illegal drugs.

==== Techniques involved in ELISA ====
Although there are three different types of solid state enzyme-linked immunosorbent assays, all three types begin with the bioimmobilization of either an antibody or antigen to a surface. This bioimmobilization is the first instance of biomolecular engineering that can be seen in ELISA implementation. This step can be performed in a number of ways including a covalent linkage to a surface which may be coated with protein or another substance. The bioimmobilization can also be performed via hydrophobic interactions between the molecule and the surface. Because there are many different types of ELISAs used for many different purposes the biomolecular engineering that this step requires varies depending on the specific purpose of the ELISA.

Another biomolecular engineering technique that is used in ELISA development is the bioconjugation of an enzyme to either an antibody or antigen depending on the type of ELISA. There is much to consider in this enzyme bioconjugation such as avoiding interference with the active site of the enzyme as well as the antibody binding site in the case that the antibody is conjugated with enzyme. This bioconjugation is commonly performed by creating crosslinks between the two molecules of interest and can require a wide variety of different reagents depending on the nature of the specific molecules.

Interleukin (IL-6) is a signaling protein that has been known to be present during an immune response. The use of the sandwich type ELISA quantifies the presence of this cytokine within spinal fluid or bone marrow samples.

== Applications and fields ==
=== In industry ===
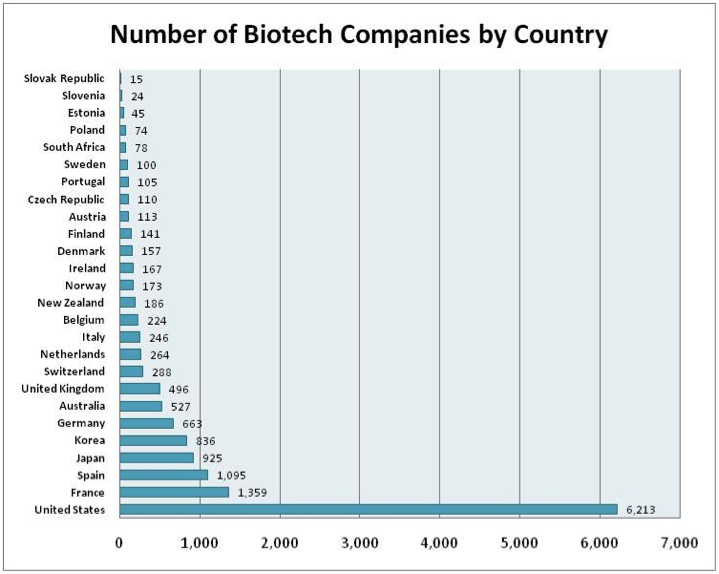
Graph showing number of biotech companies per country

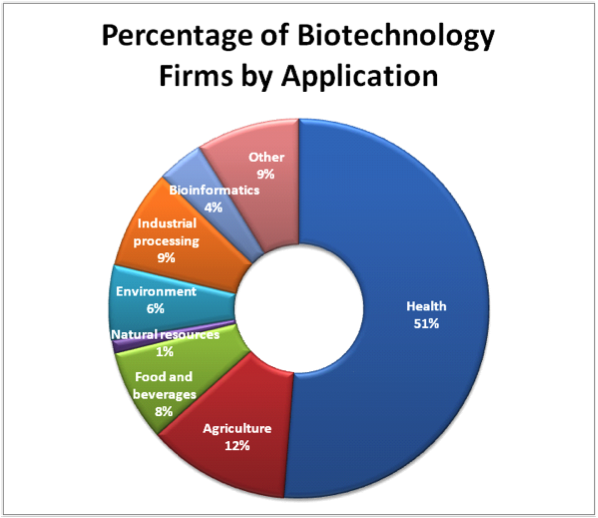
Graph showing percentages of biotech firms by application

Biomolecular engineering is an extensive discipline with applications in many different industries and fields. As such, it is difficult to pinpoint a general perspective on the Biomolecular engineering profession. The biotechnology industry, however, provides an adequate representation. The biotechnology industry, or biotech industry, encompasses all firms that use biotechnology to produce goods or services or to perform biotechnology research and development. In this way, it encompasses many of the industrial applications of the biomolecular engineering discipline. By examination of the biotech industry, it can be gathered that the principal leader of the industry is the United States, followed by France and Spain. It is also true that the focus of the biotechnology industry and the application of biomolecular engineering is primarily clinical and medical. People are willing to pay for good health, so most of the money directed towards the biotech industry stays in health-related ventures.

==== Scale-up ====
Scaling up a process involves using data from an experimental-scale operation (model or pilot plant) for the design of a large (scaled-up) unit, of commercial size. Scaling up is a crucial part of commercializing a process. For example, insulin produced by genetically modified Escherichia coli bacteria was initialized on a lab-scale, but to be made commercially viable had to be scaled up to an industrial level. In order to achieve this scale-up a lot of lab data had to be used to design commercial sized units. For example, one of the steps in insulin production involves the crystallization of high purity glargin insulin. In order to achieve this process on a large scale we want to keep the Power/Volume ratio of both the lab-scale and large-scale crystallizers the same in order to achieve homogeneous mixing. We also assume the lab-scale crystallizer has geometric similarity to the large-scale crystallizer. Therefore,

P/V α N_{i}^{3}d_{i}^{3}
where d_{i}= crystallizer impeller diameter
N_{i}= impeller rotation rate

=== Related industries ===
==== Bioengineering ====
A broad term encompassing all engineering applied to the life sciences. This field of study utilizes the principles of biology along with engineering principles to create marketable products. Some bioengineering applications include:

- Biomimetics - The study and development of synthetic systems that mimic the form and function of natural biologically produced substances and processes.
- Bioprocess engineering - The study and development of process equipment and optimization that aids in the production of many products such as food and pharmaceuticals.
- Industrial microbiology - The implementation of microorganisms in the production of industrial products such as food and antibiotics. Another common application of industrial microbiology is the treatment of wastewater in chemical plants via utilization of certain microorganisms.

==== Biochemistry ====
Biochemistry is the study of chemical processes in living organisms, including, but not limited to, living matter. Biochemical processes govern all living organisms and living processes and the field of biochemistry seeks to understand and manipulate these processes.

==== Biochemical engineering ====
- Biocatalysis – Chemical transformations using enzymes.
- Bioseparations – Separation of biologically active molecules.
- Thermodynamics and Kinetics (chemistry) – Analysis of reactions involving cell growth and biochemicals.
- Bioreactor design and analysis – Design of reactors for performing biochemical transformations.

==== Biotechnology ====
- Biomaterials – Design, synthesis and production of new materials to support cells and tissues.
- Genetic engineering – Purposeful manipulation of the genomes of organisms to produce new phenotypic traits.
- Bioelectronics, Biosensor and Biochip – Engineered devices and systems to measure, monitor and control biological processes.
- Bioprocess engineering – Design and maintenance of cell-based and enzyme-based processes for the production of fine chemicals and pharmaceuticals.

==== Bioelectrical engineering ====
Bioelectrical engineering involves the electrical fields generated by living cells or organisms. Examples include the electric potential developed between muscles or nerves of the body. This discipline requires knowledge in the fields of electricity and biology to understand and utilize these concepts to improve or better current bioprocesses or technology.

- Bioelectrochemistry - Chemistry concerned with electron/proton transport throughout the cell
- Bioelectronics - Field of research coupling biology and electronics

==== Biomedical engineering ====
Biomedical engineering is a sub category of bioengineering that uses many of the same principles but focuses more on the medical applications of the various engineering developments. Some applications of biomedical engineering include:

- Biomaterials - Design of new materials for implantation in the human body and analysis of their effect on the body.
- Cellular engineering – Design of new cells using recombinant DNA and development of procedures to allow normal cells to adhere to artificial implanted biomaterials
- Tissue engineering – Design of new tissues from the basic biological building blocks to form new tissues
- Artificial organs – Application of tissue engineering to whole organs
- Medical imaging – Imaging of tissues using CAT scan, MRI, ultrasound, x-ray or other technologies
- Medical Optics and Lasers – Application of lasers to medical diagnosis and treatment
- Rehabilitation engineering – Design of devices and systems used to aid disabled people
- Man-machine interfacing - Control of surgical robots and remote diagnostic and therapeutic systems using eye tracking, voice recognition and muscle and brain wave controls
- Human factors and ergonomics – Design of systems to improve human performance in a wide range of applications

=== Chemical engineering ===
Chemical engineering is the processing of raw materials into chemical products. It involves preparation of raw materials to produce reactants, the chemical reaction of these reactants under controlled conditions, the separation of products, the recycle of byproducts, and the disposal of wastes. Each step involves certain basic building blocks called "unit operations," such as extraction, filtration, and distillation. These unit operations are found in all chemical processes. Biomolecular engineering is a subset of Chemical Engineering that applies these same principles to the processing of chemical substances made by living organisms.

=== Education and programs ===
Newly developed and offered undergraduate programs across the United States, often coupled to the chemical engineering program, allow students to achieve a B.S. degree. According to ABET (Accreditation Board for Engineering and Technology), biomolecular engineering curricula "must provide thorough grounding in the basic sciences including chemistry, physics, and biology, with some content at an advanced level... [and] engineering application of these basic sciences to design, analysis, and control, of chemical, physical, and/or biological processes." Common curricula consist of major engineering courses including transport, thermodynamics, separations, and kinetics, with additions of life sciences courses including biology and biochemistry, and including specialized biomolecular courses focusing on cell biology, nano- and biotechnology, biopolymers, etc.

== See also ==
- Biomimetics
- Biopharmaceuticals
- Bioprocess engineering
- List of biomolecules
- Molecular engineering
