= Nallambal Lake =

Lake in Puducherry, India

- French: Lac Nalambal
- Nallambal lake, Nallambal, Karaikal district, Puducherry, India
- Location: Nallambal, Karaikal district, Puducherry, India
- Coordinates: 10.944°N 79.736°E
- Type: artificial lake
- Basin countries: India
- Built: 2014
- Settlements: Puducherry

Nallambal Lake (French: Lac Nalambal) is the only lake artificially made in Karaikal district, Puducherry in India.

== Location ==
This lake was made in the village of Nallambal near Thirunallar town.

== Details ==
The lake was developed at a cost of about ₹4.98 crore. The government of Puducherry created this lake artificially to satisfy the irrigational needs of farmers. It also has plans to turn the lake into a tourist spot.
