= Sorakudy =

Coordinates: 10.949°N 79.778°E

Sorakudy(சுரக்குடி) is a revenue village in the Thirunallar taluk of Karaikal District. It is situated to the south of Nedungadu and north-west of Thirunallar.
