= Ambagarathur =

- City
- Location in India
- Coordinates: 10°57′N 79°43′E
- Country: India
- State: Puducherry
- District: Karaikal
- Talukas: Thirunallar

Languages
  - Official: Tamil, French, English
- Time zone: UTC+5:30 (IST)
- Postal code: 609601

Ambagarathur is a revenue city in the Thirunallar taluk of Karaikal District in the Indian union territory of Puducherry. It is situated to the west of Thirunallar. Ambagarathur is 8.3 km distance from its Tensil Main Town Thirunallar . Ambagarathur is 12.9 km distance from its District Headquarters Karaikal . And 108 km distance from its State Main City Pondicherry. The place is famous for BhadraKali amman Temple.
