= Melakasakudy =

Coordinates: 10.9615269994°N 79.783590153°E

Melakasakudy is a revenue village in the Karaikal taluk of Puducherry District. It is situated to the west of Karaikal town.

== Temple ==
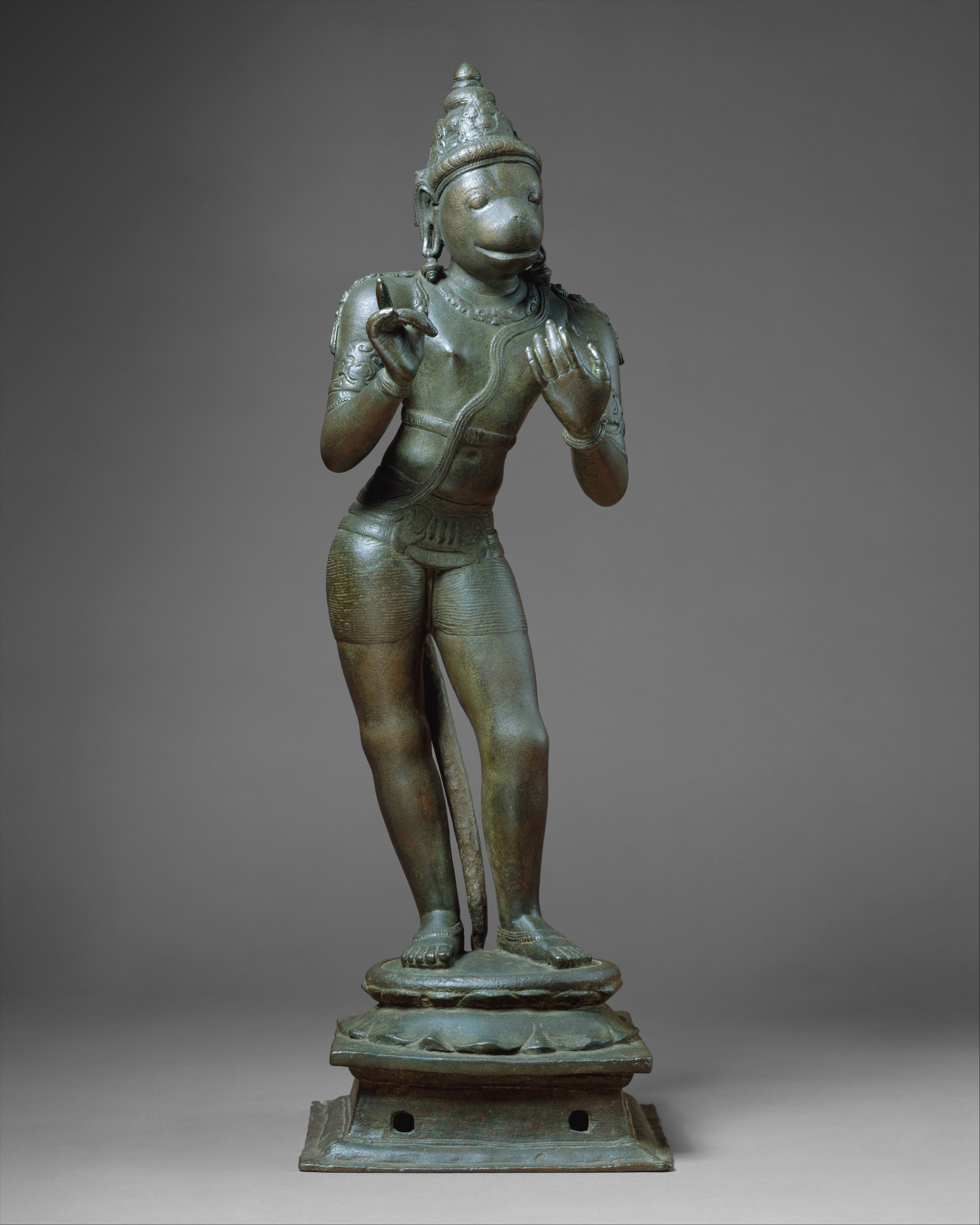
Hanuman (Met Museum)

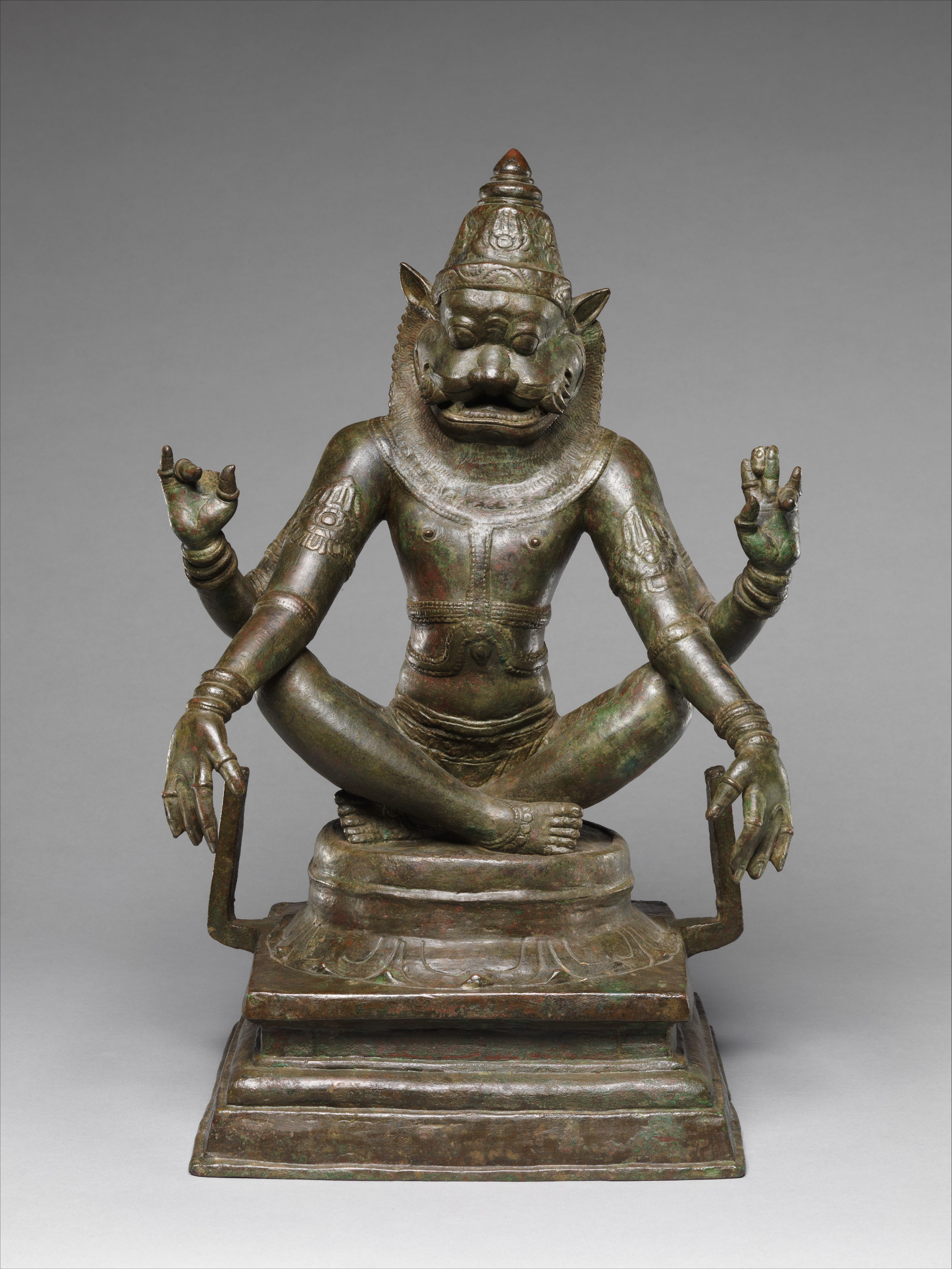
Narasimha (Met Museum)

An ancient Varatharaja Perumal temple is present in the village.

=== Idol theft ===
Eight antique idols belonging to the temple were stolen sometime between 1959 and 1962. The Nataraja idol was found 15 days later and reinstalled. A volunteer-collective India Pride Project has traced the remaining idols to few museums/institutions in the Western world.

Similar idol theft was reported from the Tantondreeswara temple in the nearby Nedungadu, beyond the Nattar River in 1959.

S.No.	Deity	Stolen Idol traced to	Country	Current status	More Details
1	Rama			Unknown	
2	Sita			Unknown	
3	Lakshmana			Unknown	
4	Hanuman	Metropolitan Museum of Art	United States	Unknown	
5	Narasimha	Metropolitan Museum of Art	United States	Unknown	
6	Chakratalvar			Unknown	
7	Thirumangai Alvar			Unknown	
8	Ambal			Unknown	
