= Thanthondreeswarar Temple, Nedungadu =

Ancient temple located in Nedungadu, Karaikal district, Puducherry Union territory

Tantondreeswara Temple
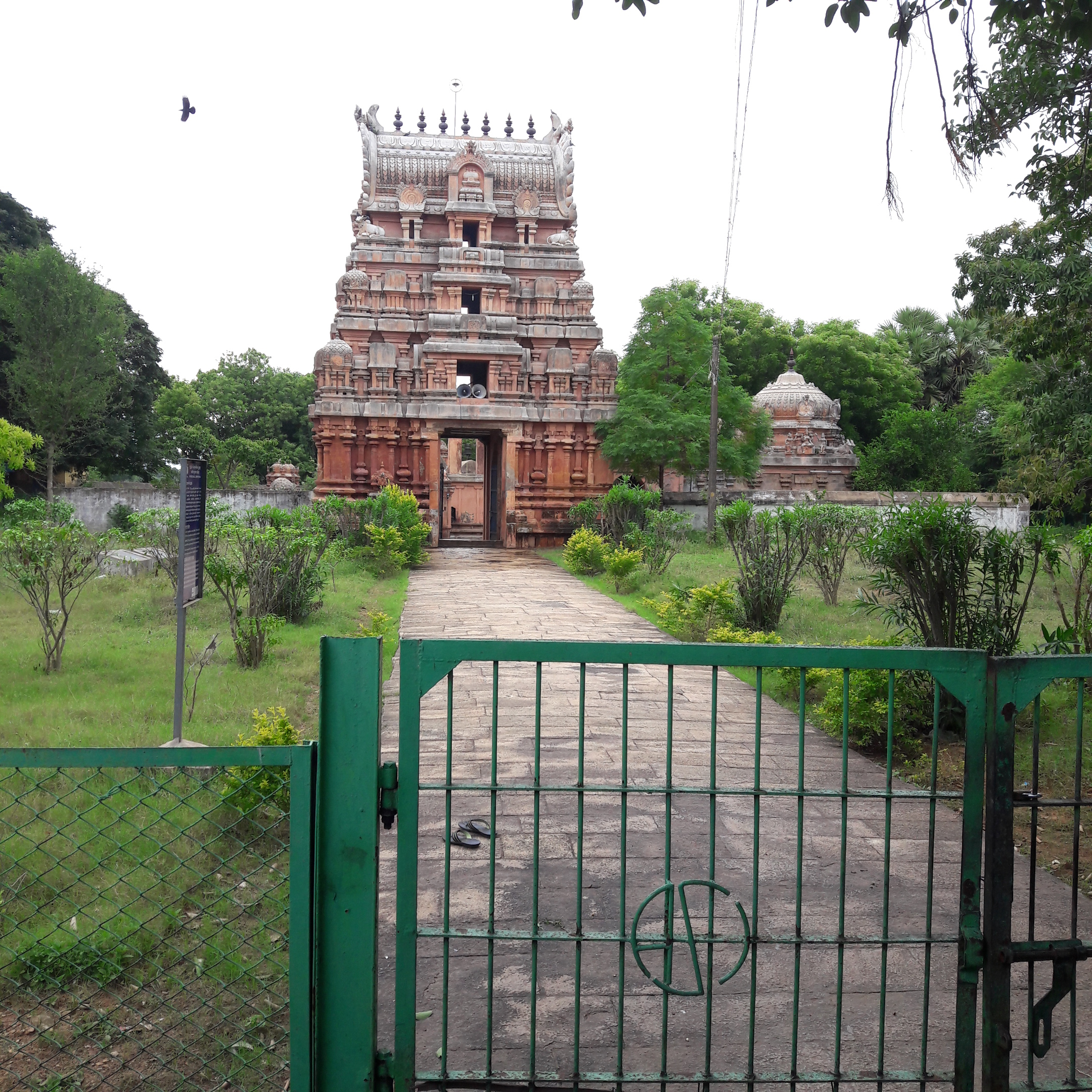

- Location in Tamil Nadu

Religion
- Affiliation: Hinduism
- District: Karaikal
- Deity: Tantondreeswara (Shiva)

Location
- Location: Puducherry, India
- State: Puducherry
- Country: India
- Interactive map of Tantondreeswara Temple
- Coordinates: 10°58′3″N 79°46′17″E

Architecture
- Type: Dravidian architecture

Tantondreeswara Temple is an ancient temple located in Nedungadu, Karaikal district, Puducherry Union territory. This temple was constructed by the Chola rulers, who dedicated this temple to Shiva. This temple from 1971 is regarded as protected monument.

== History ==
Tantondreeswara Temple was constructed by the rulers of Chola. The main deity of the temple is Tantondreeswara (Lord Shiva). The area of Nedungadu got its name from Nedunthuyar Theertha Nayaki, the consort of Tantondreeswara. Her name means the one who redressed the long grievances of the people.

== Protected Monument ==
In 1948, architectural excavations were conducted in this temple. The officials excavated about 14 Bronze sculptures belonging to 14th century. The excavated bronze idols were of Thirugnanasambandhar, Lord Vinayaga, Manickavasagar, Lord Murugan, Goddess Uma and dancing postures of Lord Shiva such as Ananda Tandavam. This temple from 1971 is regarded as a protected monument.

== Architecture ==
The entire temple is made up of Red sandstone. The sanctum enshrines the tall idol of Shivalinga which is the main deity, Tantondreeswara. The temple has many inscriptions in the outer walls of the sanctum.

== Idol theft ==
The idols of Nataraja, Sivagamasundari and Manikkavacakar belonging to the temple were stolen in 1959. The Nataraja idol was found 15 days later and reinstalled. A volunteer-collective India Pride Project has traced the remaining idols to few museums/institutions in the Western world.

Similar idol theft was reported from the Varatharaja Perumal temple in the nearby Melakasakudy, beyond the Nattar River, sometime between 1959 and 1962.

| S.No. | Deity | Stolen Idol traced to | Country | Current status | More Details |
|---|---|---|---|---|---|
| 1 | Nataraja | | | Recovered | |
| 2 | Sivagamasundari | Linden Museum | Germany | Unknown | |
| 3 | Manikkavacakar | | | Unknown | |
