= Elyankudi =

Coordinates: 10.941°N 79.764°E

Elyankudi is a revenue village in the Thirunallar taluk of Karaikal District in India. It is situated to the north-west of Thirunallar.
