= Sellur =

Coordinates: 10°48′N 79°28′E

Sellur is a revenue village in the Thirunallar taluk of Karaikal District. It is situated to the west of Thirunallar.
