= Pandaravadisethur =

Pandaravadisethur is a revenue village in the Thirunallar taluk of Karaikal District. It is situated to the north-west of Thirunallar.
