= Rasi =

Rasi may refer to:

People

- Alessio Rasi (born 1999), Italian footballer
- Francesco Rasi (1574–1621), Italian composer, singer (tenor), chitarrone player, and poet
- Guido Rasi (born 1954), Italian physician and former Executive Director of the European Medicines Agency
- Marjatta Rasi (born 1945), Finnish diplomat
- Muhammad ibn Zakariya al-Razi (or Rasis; c. 865–925 CE), Persian polymath, physician, alchemist, philosopher
- Petteri Rasi, Finnish professional ice hockey player
- Raasi (actress)
- Ras-I Dowling (b. 1988), American football cornerback
- Richard Raši (b. 1971), Slovak physician and politician

Work

- Responsibility assignment matrix, one of many alternatives of RACI

Culture

- Rāśi, Hindu zodiacal sign
- Kanni Rasi (Virgo Sign), 1985 Tamil-language drama film

Places

- Raşi and Sălcioara, in Romania
- Rasi Salai Dam, in Thailand
