= Thennankudy =

Coordinates: 10.932°N 79.757°E

Thennankudy is a revenue village in the Thirunallar taluk of Karaikal District. It is situated to the west of Thirunallar.
