= Pettai, Karaikal =

Pettai
- village
- Location within Tamil Nadu Location within India
- Coordinates: 10°54′11″N 79°47′54″E
- Country: India
- State: Puducherry
- District: Karaikal
- Taluka: Thirunallar Taluk

Population (2011)
  - Total: 3,208
- Time zone: UTC+5:30 (IST)

Pettai is a panchayat village and revenue village in Pondicherry Union Territory, India. Administratively, Pettai is under the Thirunallar Taluk (formerly Thirunallar Commune Panchayat) of Karaikal District, Pondicherry Union Territory. Pettai is situated on the banks of the Arasalar River, to the west of Karaikal town and south of Thirunallar.

In the 2011 census 3,208 people were recorded as living in Pettai village.
