= European Federation of Pharmaceutical Industries and Associations =

Brussels-based trade association

EFPIA
- European Federation of Pharmaceutical Industries and Associations
- Formation: 1978
- Founded at: Brussels, Belgium
- Purpose: Trade association
- Location: Brussels, Belgium
- Region served: Europe
- Members: 37 national associations, 55 corporate members
- Key people: Nathalie Moll (General Director)
- Staff: 60 (2023)
- Website: www.efpia.eu

The European Federation of Pharmaceutical Industries and Associations (EFPIA) is a Brussels-based trade association and lobbying organisation, founded in 1978, it represents the pharmaceutical industry in Europe. It consists of 36 national associations, 40 pharmaceutical companies and "a growing number" of small and medium enterprises.

== EFPIA priorities ==
EFPIA priorities include speeding up regulatory approval and reimbursement processes for new medicines, creating a strong science base in Europe, joining forces with key stakeholders on political issues concerning health and addressing safety concerns. EFPIA also includes specialised groups like Vaccines Europe who produce approximately 80% of vaccines used worldwide and European Biopharmaceutical Enterprises harness biotechnology to develop approximately one-fifth of new medicines.

== Innovative Medicines Initiative ==
The Innovative Medicines Initiative (IMI) is a public-private partnership designed by the European Commission and EFPIA. It is a pan-European collaboration that brings together large biopharmaceutical companies, small- and medium-sized enterprises (SMEs), patient organisations, academia, hospitals and public authorities. The initiative aims to accelerate the discovery and development of better medicines by removing bottlenecks in the drug development process. It focuses on creating better methods and tools to improve and enhance the drug development process, rather than developing specific, new medicines.

== Controversy ==
From 1991 to 1998 Emer Cooke worked for the EFPIA. She became executive director of the European Medicines Agency (EMA), an agency of the European Union (EU) in charge of the evaluation and supervision of medicinal products, in November 2020.

In a session of the Austrian Parliament member of parliament Gerald Hauser on 1 April 2021 publicly criticised a potential conflict of interest, by her allowing the controversial Oxford–AstraZeneca COVID-19 vaccine to be approved, while having worked for the very same industry in the past as a lobbyist of the EFPIA.

== See also ==
- European and Developing Countries Clinical Trials Partnership (EDCTP)
- EuropaBio
- European Federation of Biotechnology (EFB)
- International Federation of Pharmaceutical Manufacturers Associations (IFPMA)
- Pharmaceutical Research and Manufacturers of America (PhRMA)
