= EuropaBio =

European biotech industry group

- Company type: Advocacy group
- Industry: Biotechnology
- Founded: 1996
- Headquarters: Brussels, Belgium
- Key people: Dr. Claire Skentelbery, Director General
- Website: www.europabio.org

EuropaBio ("The European Association for Bioindustries") is Europe's largest and most influential biotech industry group, whose members include leading large-size healthcare and industrial biotechnology companies. EuropaBio is located in Brussels, Belgium. The organisation was initiated in 1996 to represent the interests of the biotechnology industry at the European level, and therefore influence legislation that serves the interests of biotechnology companies in Europe.

== Activity and goals ==
EuropaBio is engaged in dialogue with the European Parliament, the European Commission, and the Council of Ministers to influence legislation on biotechnology.

EuropaBio represents two sectors of the biotech industry.

- White or industrial biotechnology is the application of biotechnology for industrial purposes, including manufacturing, alternative energy (or "bioenergy") biofuels, and biomaterials.
- Red or healthcare biotechnology is the application of biotechnology for the production of medicines and therapies.

EuropaBio's stated goals are:

- promoting an innovative, coherent, and dynamic biotechnology-based industry in Europe;
- advocating free and open markets and the removal of barriers to competitiveness with other areas of the world;
- committing to an open, transparent, and informed dialogue with all stakeholders about the ethical, social, and economic aspects of biotechnology and its benefits;
- championing the socially responsible use of biotechnology to ensure that its potential is fully used to the benefit of humans and their environment.

EuropaBio's primary focus is the European Union but because of the global character of the biotech business, it also represents its members in transatlantic and worldwide forums.

== Organisation ==
EuropaBio has a board of management made up of representatives from among its industry members. Since 2023, Dr. Sarah Reisinger representing dsm-firmenich is chair of the board.

The board is assisted by sectoral councils representing the main segments of EuropaBio – healthcare (red biotech), and industrial (white biotech).

Additionally, National Associations are represented through the National Associations Council.

Experts from member companies and national associations participate in EuropaBio's working groups which cover a wide range of issues and areas of concern of biotech enterprises.

Since November 2020 EuropaBio Director General is Dr. Claire Skentelbery.

== Members ==
In 2021, the association represents 79 corporate and associate members and BioRegions, and 17 national biotechnology associations in turn representing over 1800 biotech SMEs.

== See also ==
- CropLife International
- European Federation of Biotechnology (EFB)
- European Federation of Pharmaceutical Industries and Associations (EFPIA)
- Genetically modified food controversies
- Regulation of the release of genetic modified organisms
