= Agarakurumbagaram =

Coordinates: 10.981175°N 79.76743°E

Agarakurumbagaram is a revenue village in the Thirunallar taluk of Karaikal District. It is situated to the north-west of Karaikal town.
