= European Federation of Biotechnology =

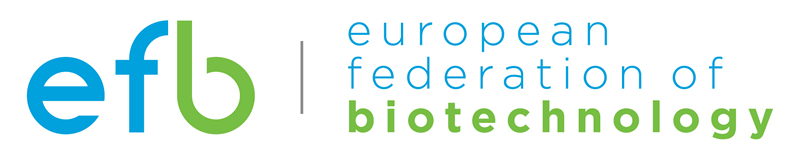
- Abbreviation: EFB
- Formation: 1978
- Founded at: Interlaken, Switzerland
- Type: Non-profit federation
- Purpose: Promote biotechnology
- Headquarters: Barcelona, Spain
- Region served: Europe
- Fields: Biotechnology
- Members: More than 25,000
- Website: www.efbiotechnology.org

The European Federation of Biotechnology (EFB) was established by European scientists in 1978. It is a non-profit federation of national biotechnology associations, learned societies, universities, scientific institutes, biotechnology companies and individual biotechnologists working to promote biotechnology throughout Europe and beyond.

Its mission is to promote the safe, sustainable and beneficial use of life sciences, to promote cutting edge research and innovation, to provide a forum for interdisciplinary and international cooperation, to improve scientific education and to facilitate an informed dialogue between scientists, the biotechnology industries and the public.

The EFB has more than 25,000 individual members and seven divisions:

- Biobased Materials Division
- Biocatalysis Division
- Bioengineering and Bioprocessing Division
- Biopharmaceutical Division
- Environmental Biotechnology Division
- Microbial Biotechnology Division
- Plant, Agriculture and Food Division.

The EFB Central Office (ECO) is located in Barcelona.

== European Congress on Biotechnology ==
The European Congress on Biotechnology (ECB) is a conference for academic and industrial biotechnologists, organised by EFB.

The first congress was held in Interlaken, Switzerland, in 1978, and inaugurated the federation. The congress is held every second year.

== Other events ==
The EFB, together with its divisions, organises specialised biotechnology events, such as:

- Applied Synthetic Biology in Europe (ASBE)
- Recombinant Protein Production (RPP)
- Green for Good (G4G) series
- Microbial Stress
- Conference on Physiology of Yeasts and Filamentous Fungi (PYFF).

== Journals ==
New Biotechnology is the EFB's official journal, a peer-reviewed publication issued bimonthly by Elsevier since 2008. The federation also publishes the open-access EFB Bioeconomy Journal, which covers research and policy relating to the bioeconomy.

== See also ==
- Directorate-General for Research and Innovation, the European Commission's research department
- European Chemical Society (formerly EuCheMS), a federation of European chemical societies
- EuropaBio, the European biotechnology industry association
- European Federation of Pharmaceutical Industries and Associations (EFPIA)
