= Kilianur, Karaikal =

Village in India

Coordinates: 11.043°N 79.678°E

Kilianur is a revenue village in the Thirunallar taluk of Karaikal District. It is situated to the north-west of Karaikal town.
