= Nallambal =

Village in India

Coordinates: 10.948°N 79.741°E

Nallambal is a revenue village in the Thirunallar taluk of Karaikal District, India. It is situated to the north-west of Thirunallar.
