= Bioorthogonal chemical reporter =

Non-native chemical functionality

In chemical biology, bioorthogonal chemical reporter is a non-native chemical functionality that is introduced into the naturally occurring biomolecules of a living system, generally through metabolic or protein engineering. These functional groups are subsequently utilized for tagging and visualizing biomolecules. Jennifer Prescher and Carolyn R. Bertozzi, the developers of bioorthogonal chemistry, defined bioorthogonal chemical reporters as "non-native, non-perturbing chemical handles that can be modified in living systems through highly selective reactions with exogenously delivered probes." It has been used to enrich proteins and to conduct proteomic analysis.

In the early development of the technique, chemical motifs have to fulfill criteria of biocompatibility and selective reactivity in order to qualify as bioorthogonal chemical reporters. Some combinations of proteinogenic amino acid side chains meet the criteria, as do ketone and aldehyde tags. Azides and alkynes are other examples of chemical reporters.

A bioorthogonal chemical reporter must be incorporated into a biomolecule. This occurs via metabolism. The chemical reporter is linked to a substrate, which a cell can metabolize.
