= Melasuprayapuram =

Melasuprayapuram is a revenue village in the Thirunallar taluk of Karaikal District. It is situated to the west of Karaikal town.
