= New Biotechnology =

- Discipline: Biotechnology
- Language: English
- Edited by: Mike Taussig

Publication details
- Former name(s): Biomolecular Engineering, Genetic Analysis: Biomolecular Engineering, Gene Analysis Techniques
- History: 1984-present
- Publisher: Elsevier
- Frequency: Bimonthly
- Impact factor: 5.079 (2020)

Standard abbreviations
- ISO 4: New Biotechnol.

Indexing
- ISSN: 1871-6784 (print); 1876-4347 (web)
- LCCN: 2008243693
- OCLC no.: 236073824

Links
- Journal homepage; Online access

New Biotechnology is a peer-reviewed scientific journal and the official journal of the European Federation of Biotechnology. It is published bimonthly by Elsevier. The journal covers research, industrial, and commercial aspects of biotechnology, in areas such as: healthcare and pharmaceuticals; food and agriculture; biofuels; genetic engineering and molecular biology; genomics and synthetic biology; nanotechnology; environment and biodiversity; biocatalysis; bioremediation; and process engineering.

== History ==
The journal was established in 1984 as Gene Analysis Techniques (ISSN 0735-0651). It changed names in 1991 (Genetic Analysis: Biomolecular Engineering, ISSN 1050-3862) and 1999 (Biomolecular Engineering, ISSN 1389-0344), before obtaining its current title in 2007.

== Abstracting and indexing ==
The journal is abstracted and indexed in:

- BIOSIS
- BIOBASE
- Chemical Abstracts
- Cambridge Scientific Abstracts
- EMBASE
- EMBiology
- MEDLINE
- Scopus
