= International Coalition of Medicines Regulatory Authorities =

Global conference

The International Coalition of Medicines Regulatory Authorities (ICMRA) is a global conference of government health bureaucrats.

== History ==
In 2012, at the margins of the 65th World Health Assembly conference in May the Minister of Health of Brazil proposed an agenda to create a new coalition of Heads of Agency "to address current and emerging human medicine regulatory and safety challenges globally, strategically and in an ongoing, transparent, authoritative and institutional manner."

The health bureaucrats pursued this agenda again in October, at the International Conference of Drug Regulatory Authorities (ICDRA), and again in December 2012 at the Heads of Medicines Regulatory Agencies Summit. "As a result, a consensus has emerged on the desirability of developing an ICMRA to address common issues."

Amongst the reasons cited for this body to be established was "Continued industry and political pressures to harmonise and align regulatory practices and activities."

=== COVID-19 response ===
The ICMRA "held a global medicines regulators web meeting on March 18, 2020. Discussions included regulatory considerations for anticipated COVID-19 vaccine candidates to advance regulatory convergence. A key objective of the meeting was to discuss and agree on an approach to the requirements to support first-in-human clinical trials."

The ICMRA issued a joint press release on 28 April 2020. The ICMRA held three virtual meetings with more than 100 participants each from our 29 members over the month of April. The chief result of these meetings was to streamline regulatory oversight during the COVID-19 pandemic.

== Participants ==
The World Health Organization is listed as an observer. The list of participants as of April 2020 is as follows:

- European Commission - Directorate General for Health and Consumers (DG-SANCO)
- European Medicines Agency (EMA)
- Federal Commission for the Protection against Sanitary Risks (COFEPRIS)
- Food and Drug Administration (FDA)
- French National Agency for Medicines and Health Products Safety (ANSM)
- Health Products and Food Branch Health Canada (HPFB-HC)
- Health Product Regulatory Authority (HPRA)
- Health Sciences Authority (HSA)
- Italian Medicines Agency (AIFA)
- Medical Products Agency (MPA)
- Medicines and Healthcare Products Regulatory Agency (MHRA)
- Medicines Control Council (MCC)
- Medicines Evaluation Board (MEB)
- Medsafe, Clinical Leadership, Protection & Regulation, Ministry of Health
- Ministry of Food and Drug Safety (MFDS)
- Ministry of Health and Family Welfare
- Ministry of Health, Labour and Welfare (MHLW)
- National Agency for Food Drug Administration and Control (NAFDAC)
- National Health Surveillance Agency (Anvisa)
- National Medical Products Administration (NMPA)
- Paul-Ehrlich-Institute (PEI)
- Pharmaceuticals and Medical Devices Agency (PMDA)
- Swissmedic
- Therapeutic Goods Administration (TGA)
- The Office for Registration of Medicinal Products,

As of April 2020, associate members are listed below:

- Austrian Medicines and Medical Devices Agency (AGES MEA) **
- Danish Medicines Agency**
- Medical Devices and Biocidal Products (URPLWMiPB)**
- Spanish Agency of Medicines and Medical Devices (AEMPS)**
- Federal Service for Surveillance in Healthcare (Roszdravnadzor)**
