= Alessio Rasi =

Italian footballer (born 1999)

Personal information
- Date of birth: 4 August 1999 (age 27)
- Place of birth: Rome, Italy
- Height: 1.80 m (5 ft 11 in)
- Position: Left back

Team information
- Current team: Tivoli

Senior career*
Years	Team	Apps	(Gls)
2016–2017	Tor Tre Teste		
2017–2019	Monterosi	69	(0)
2019–2020	AlbinoLeffe	1	(0)
2020	→ Rieti (loan)	5	(0)
2020–2021	Vibonese	15	(0)
2021–2022	Pescara	11	(0)
2022–2023	Roma City	20	(4)
2023–2024	Campobasso	17	(1)
2024–2026	Ostia Mare	41	(4)
2026–	Tivoli		
- * Club domestic league appearances and goals as of 31 May 2026

Alessio Rasi (born 4 August 1999) is an Italian professional footballer who plays as a left back for Eccellenza club Tivoli.

== Club career ==
Born in Rome, Rasi started his career in GSD Nuova Tor Tre Teste.

On 19 July 2017, Rasi joined Serie D club Monterosi.

After two seasons in Monterosi, on 22 July 2019 he signed with Serie C club AlbinoLeffe. Rasi made his professional debut on 8 September 2019 against Pro Vercelli.

On 31 January 2020, he was loaned to Rieti for the rest of the season.

For the 2020–21 season, he signed with Vibonese.

On 3 August 2021, he moved to Pescara of Serie C.

On 15 December 2022, Rasi joined Roma City in Serie D.
