= Nattar River =

River in Tamil Nadu, India

Coordinates: 10°58′N 79°51′E

Nattar river is a significant distributary of the Cauvery River in the Cauvery Delta of Tamil Nadu and the Karaikal region of the Union Territory of Puducherry, India.

== Geography and Course ==
The river originates near Sakkottai in Thanjavur district, flowing through a sluice gate from the Arasalar reservoir. And it flows eastward through Mayiladuthurai, Nagapattinam, and Karaikal, before emptying into the Bay of Bengal near Karaikal beach. The river supports local agriculture, particularly paddy cultivation, and plays an important ecological and cultural role in the region. Government records such as weir tender documents mark locations up to 70 km (43 mi).

== See also ==
List of rivers of Tamil Nadu
