= Guido Rasi =

Italian physician (born 1954)

Guido Rasi (born 1954) is an Italian physician who was the executive director of the European Medicines Agency (EMA).

== Biography ==
Rasi was born in Padua, Italy. After his graduation in Medicine, he worked as a physician in Rome from 1978 to 1990. From 1990 until 2005 Rasi was employed at the Institute for Experimental Medicine of the National Research Council, Italy. During this time, he went for teaching and research to the University of California, Berkeley in 1999. In 2005, he was named director of research at the Institute of Neurobiology and Molecular Medicine of the National Research Council in Rome. In 2008 he became director-general of the Italian Medicines Agency, having been a member of its management board since 2004. From 2011 until his forced resignation in 2014 Rasi was the executive director of EMA. The resignation was the result of an EU court decision that found conflicts of interests at the pre-selection stage in his election. He served subsequently for one year as EMA's principal advisor in charge of strategy. From November 2015 to November 2020 he was executive director of EMA again.

In 2008 Rasi became a professor of microbiology at the University of Rome Tor Vergata.

During Rasi's term the EMA relocated from London to Amsterdam due to Brexit; the move was completed in March 2019.

== Publications and patents ==
Rasi has published articles in the medical field such as immunity, allergies, and cancer, and about regulatory issues in medicine. Rasi holds patents for potential medical treatments.
