= Nedungadu =

Nedungadu Nédouncadou
- Village
- Location in India
- Coordinates: 10°58′00″N 79°46′00″E
- Country: India
- State: Puducherry
- District: Karaikal

Population (2001)
  - Total: 15,406

Languages
  - Official: Tamil
  - Additional: English, French
- Time zone: UTC+5:30 (IST)
- Vehicle registration: PY 02

Nedungadu, formerly Nédouncadou, is a town and commune in the Karaikal District of Puducherry, India. It is known for Nedungadu Tantondresswara temple, which is under an archaeological survey of India protectorate.

== Demography ==
According to the 2001 census, Nedungadu had a population of 15,406 with 7,573 men and 7,833 women. The female:male sex ratio was 1034:1000.
