= Thirunallar =

Town in Karaikal, India

- Panchayat Town
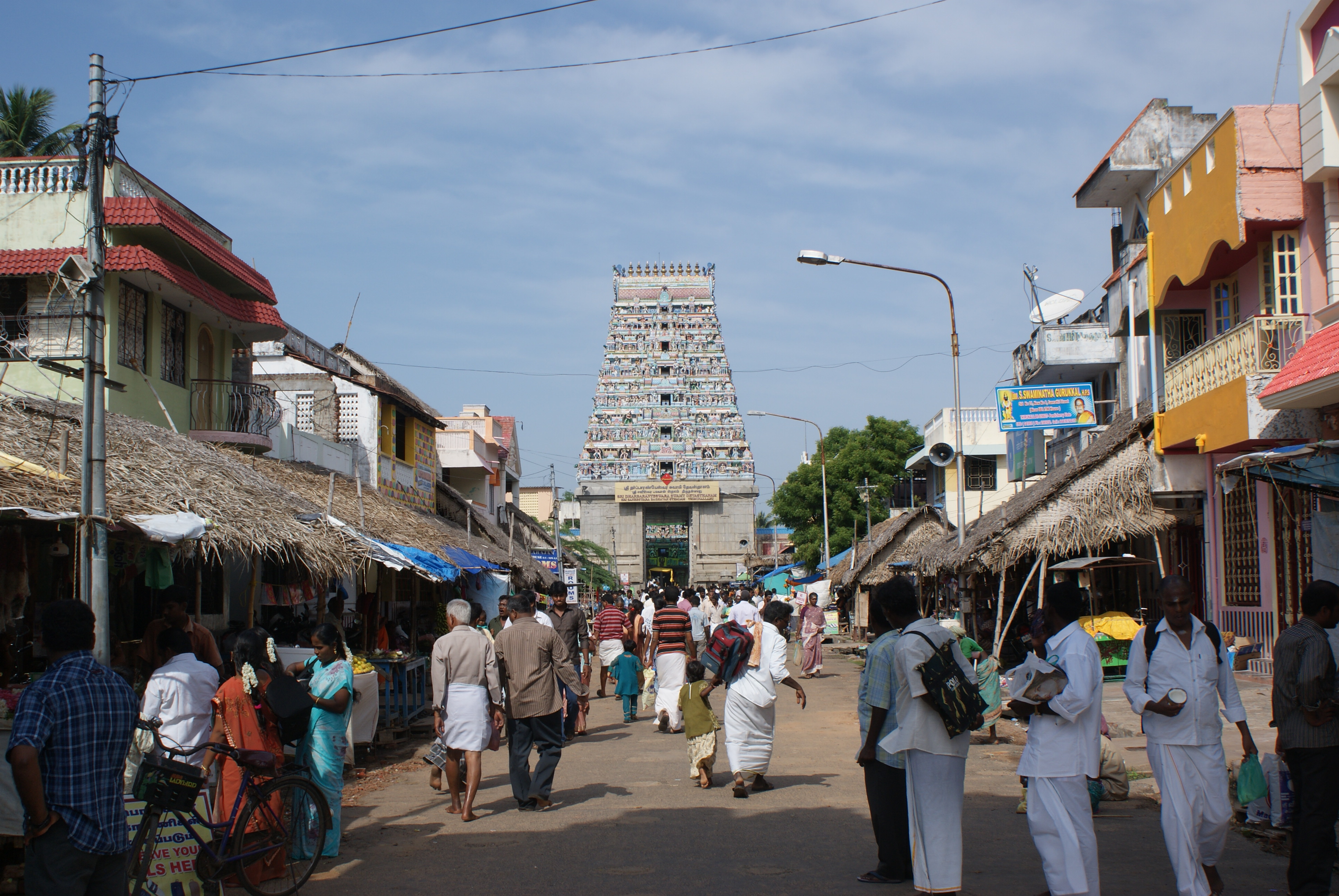
- The Sannathi or Sannadi (temple enclosure street) of the Dharbaranyesvarar temple, with its gopuram in perspective.

- Location in Tamil Nadu, India
- Coordinates: 10.9264°N 79.7920°E
- Country: India
- Union Territory: Puducherry
- District: Karaikal
- Region: Chola Nadu

Government
  - Body: Town Panchayat

Languages
  - Official: Tamil
  - Additional: English, French
- Time zone: UTC+5:30 (IST)

Thirunallar is a small town in southeastern India in the Karaikal District of the Union Territory of Puducherry, near the town of Karaikal. The village is home to the Dharbaranyesvarar temple, dedicated to Shiva, which contains within it a shrine of Shani (Saturn).

== History and etymology ==
The town was historically known as Dharbaranyam, from the Sanskrit-derived Tamil darba (a sacred grass, also called kusa grass) and aranyam ("forest"), the area having originally been forested with this grass. The Dharbaranyeswarar temple, the town's principal shrine, is a Paadal Petra Sthalam, having been venerated in the seventh-century Tevaram hymns of the Nayanmar saints Sambandar and Appar.

The present masonry structure of the temple is attributed to the Chola dynasty in the 9th century, with later expansions credited to Vijayanagar rulers. Karaikal district, in which Thirunallar lies, was part of French India from 1750 until it was transferred to independent India on 1 November 1954.

According to a local legend, the mythical king Nala was afflicted by the malefic influence of the planet Saturn and was relieved of this affliction after bathing in the temple tank and worshipping Shiva at this site; the town's name is popularly derived from this legend.

== Religion ==
Thirunallar is best known for the Dharbaranyeswarar temple, dedicated to Shiva, which also houses a shrine to Shani (Saturn) and is one of the nine Navagraha temples of Tamil Nadu. The temple draws especially large crowds during Sani Peyarchi, the roughly 2.5-year transit of Saturn between zodiac signs in Hindu astrology.

== See also ==
- Thirunallar taluk
- Thirunallar Assembly constituency
- Karaikal district
- Tirunallar Dharbaranyeswarar Temple
