= 2021 Puducherry Legislative Assembly election =

Indian union territory election

- 6 April 2021

All 30 seats in the Puducherry Legislative Assembly 16 seats needed for a majority
- Registered: 1,004,507
- Turnout: 83.42% (▼1.66pp)
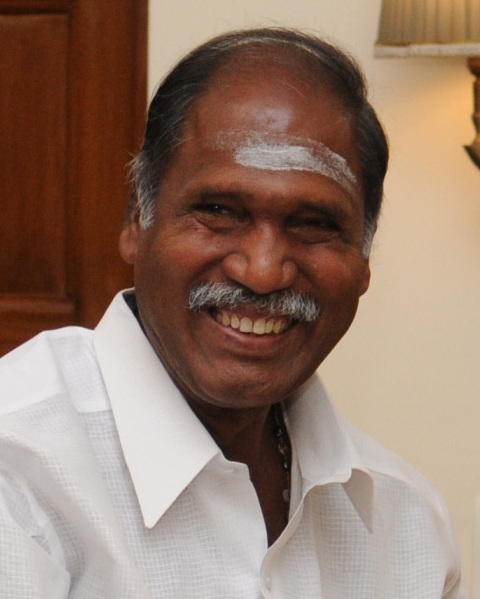

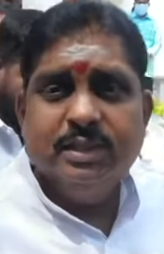

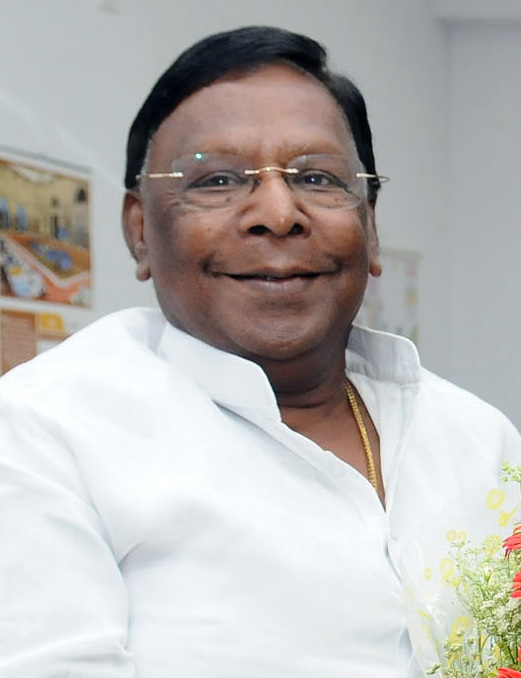
	Majority party	Minority party
Leader	N. Rangaswamy	R. Siva
Party	AINRC	DMK
Alliance	AINRC+	SPA+UPA
Leader since	2011	2011
Leader's seat	Thattanchavady (won); Yanam (lost)	Villianur (won)
Last election	28.1%, 8 seats	8.9%, 2 seats
Seats won	10	6
Seat change	▲2	▲4
Popular vote	216,249	154,858
Percentage	25.85%	18.51%
Swing	▼2.25pp	▲9.61pp
Alliance seats	16	8
Seat change	▲2	▼9
Alliance vote	364,961	284,547
Alliance percentage	44.20%	37.90%
Alliance swing	▲13.70 pp	▼3.80 pp
	Third party	Fourth party
Leader	A. Namassivayam	V. Narayanasamy
Party	BJP	INC
Alliance	AINRC+	SPA
Leader since	2021	2016
Leader's seat	Mannadipet (won)	Did not contest
Last election	2.36%, 0 seats	30.61%, 15 seats
Seats won	6	2
Seat change	▲6	▼13
Popular vote	114,298	131,393
Percentage	13.66%	15.71%
Swing	▲11.3pp	▼14.9pp
Alliance seats	16	8
Seat change	▲6	▼13
Alliance vote	364,961	284,547
Alliance percentage	44.20%	37.90%
Alliance swing	▲13.70 pp	▼3.80 pp
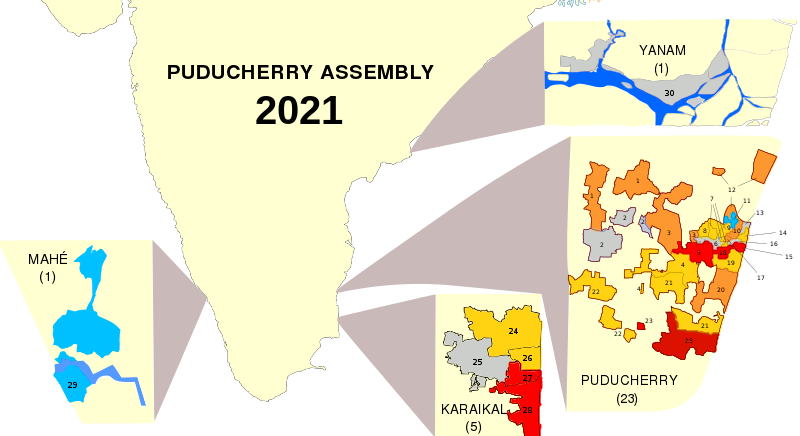
Chief Minister before election
V. Narayanasamy
INC
Elected Chief Minister
N. Rangaswamy
AINRC

The elections to elect the members of the 15th Puducherry Assembly was held on 6 April 2021. The elections were held for all the 30 constituencies of the Puducherry Legislative Assembly.

The National Democratic Alliance won a simple majority in the elections, and N. Rangaswamy of the All India N. R. Congress was sworn in as the chief minister for the fourth time.

== Background ==
Elections to a legislative assembly in India are usually held once in five years, and the members of the legislative assembly are directly elected to serve five year terms from single-member constituencies. The previous assembly elections were held in May 2021 to elect the 30 members of the 14th Puducherry Assembly.

In the previous election, the Indian National Congress-led United Progressive Alliance formed the government after winning 17 of the 30 seats, and V. Narayanasamy sworn in as the chief minister. All India N.R. Congress (AINRC), which had formed the government under N. Rangaswamy after the 2011 elections, won eight seats, and Rangaswamy became the leader of the opposition in the assembly.

In February 2021, a trust vote was called by the lieutenant governor after five members of the Congress including two ministers, and one member of the Dravida Munnetra Kazhagam (DMK) resigned from the assembly. With the strength of the house reduced to 27, which included the three nominated members, the government had the support of only 11 members. After the government lost the trust vote, Narayanasamy resigned as chief minister on 22 February. Later, Narayanasamy stated that the government lost because the speaker accepted the votes from nominated members on equal standing to the elected ones, and the lieutenant governor, who was a former member of the Bharatiya Janata Party (BJP), had appointed members of the same party for all the nominated seats.

== Schedule ==
Event	Date
Beginning of nominations	12 March 2021
Deadline for filing Nominations	19 March 2021
Scrutiny of nominations	20 March 2021
Deadline for withdrawal of candidatures	22 March 2021
Polling	6 April 2021
Counting	2 May 2021

== Parties and alliances ==
=== United Progressive Alliance ===
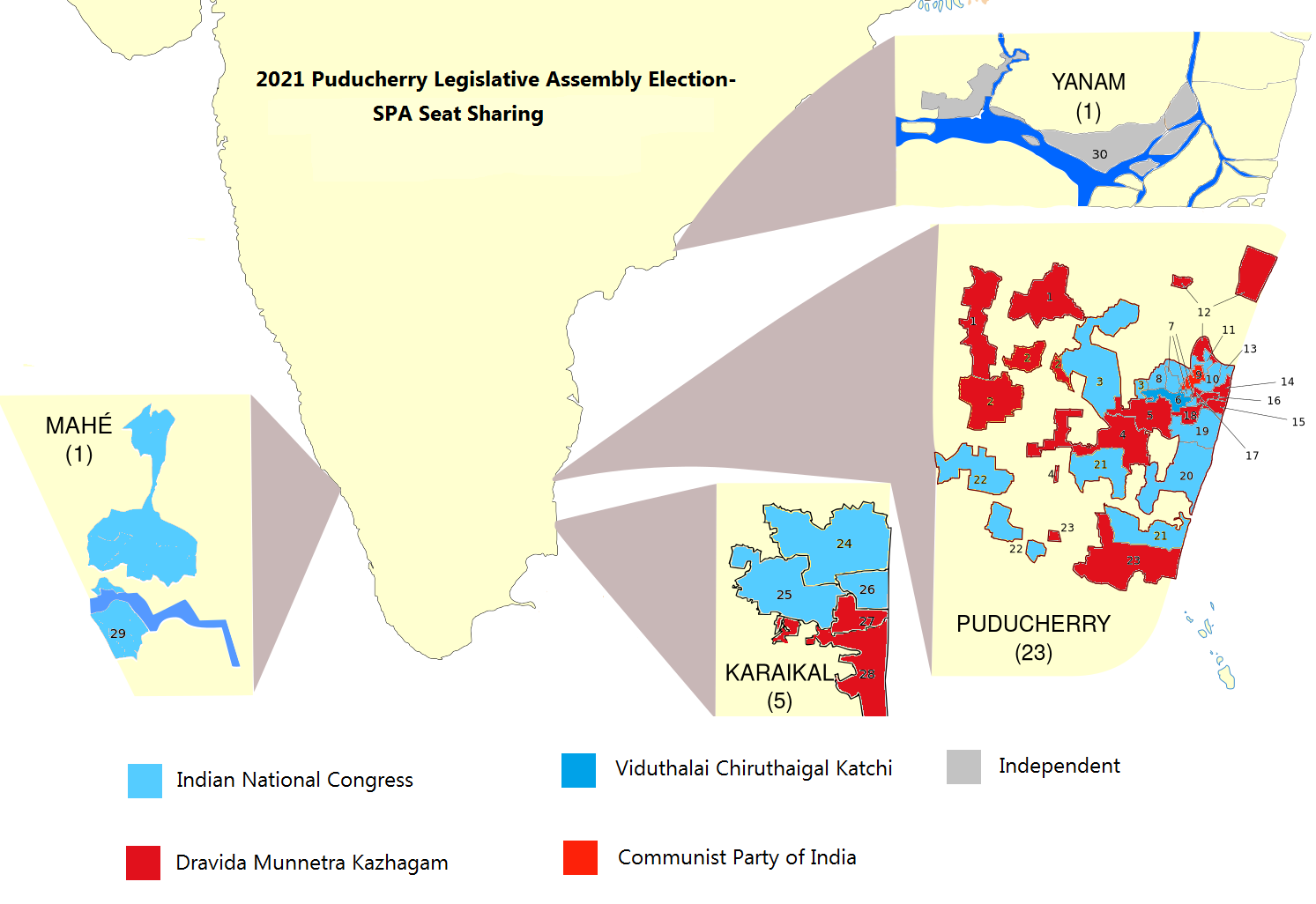
Seat sharing amongst the members of United Progressive Alliance

The Congress led United Progressive Alliance contested the elections in alliance with the DMK. The Communist Party of India (Marxist) contested the Muthialpet seat and supported the alliance in all other seats.

United Progressive Alliance
Party	Flag	Symbol	Leader	Seats
Indian National Congress			V. Narayanasamy	14
Dravida Munnetra Kazhagam			R. Siva	13
Communist Party of India			A. M. Saleem	1
Viduthalai Chiruthaigal Katchi			Thol. Thirumavalavan	1
Independent			Gollapalli Srinivas Ashok	1 (Note: Congress did not contest in Yanam and extended support to the independent.)
Total				30

=== AINRC-led Alliance ===
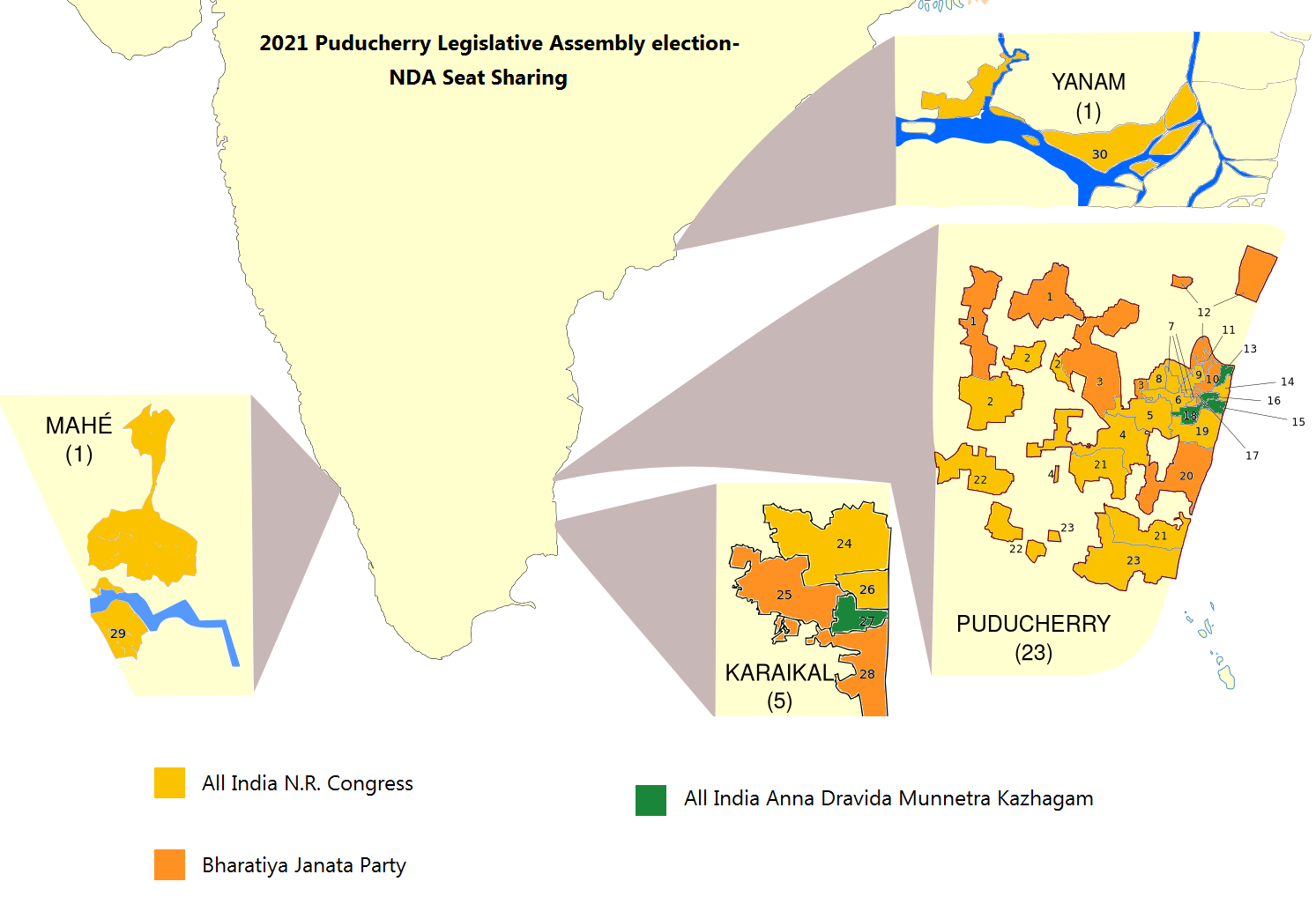
Constituency sharing of AINRC+ allies for the 2021 Puducherry Legislative Assembly election

The AINRC-led Alliance led by the AINRC, consisted of BJP and AIADMK. The Pattali Makkal Katchi, which initially announced candidates to nine seats, later withdrew from competition, and supported the alliance without contesting in any seat.

AINRC-led Alliance
Party	Flag	Symbol	Leader	Seats
All India N.R. Congress			N. Rangaswamy	16
Bharatiya Janata Party			A. Namassivayam	9
All India Anna Dravida Munnetra Kazhagam			A. Anbalagan	5
Total				30

=== Other parties ===
Party		Symbol	Leader	Seats contested
Communist Party of India (Marxist-Leninist) Liberation	CPI(ML)L		Dipankar Bhattacharya	1
Communist Party of India (Marxist)	CPI(M)		K. Balakrishnan	1
Desiya Murpokku Dravida Kazhagam	DMDK		Vijayakanth	26
Indhiya Jananayaga Katchi	IJK		T. R. Paarivendhar	21
Makkal Needhi Maiam	MNM		Kamal Haasan	22

== Candidates ==
List Of Candidates
District	Constituency		UPA		AINRC+	
District	#	Name	Party	Candidate	Party	Candidate
Puducherry	1	Mannadipet	DMK	A. Krishnan	BJP	A. Namassivayam
Puducherry	2	Thirubuvanai (SC)	DMK	A. Mugilan	AINRC	B. Gobika
Puducherry	3	Ossudu (SC)	INC	P. Karthikeyan	BJP	A. K. Sai J. Saravanan Kumar
Puducherry	4	Mangalam	DMK	Sankumaravel	AINRC	C. Djeacoumar
Puducherry	5	Villianur	DMK	R. Siva	AINRC	S. V. Sugumaran
Puducherry	6	Ozhukarai	VCK	D. Angalane	AINRC	G. Pannirselvam
Puducherry	7	Kadirkamam	INC	P. Selvanathan	AINRC	S. Ramesh
Puducherry	8	Indira Nagar	INC	M. Kannan	AINRC	A. K. D. Arumugam
Puducherry	9	Thattanchavady	CPI	K. Sethu Selvam	AINRC	N. Rangaswamy
Puducherry	10	Kamaraj Nagar	INC	M. O. H. F. Shahjahan	BJP	A. Johnkumar
Puducherry	11	Lawspet	INC	M. Vaithianathan	BJP	V. Saminathan
Puducherry	12	Kalapet	DMK	S. Muthuvel	BJP	P. M. L. Kalyanasundaram
Puducherry	13	Muthialpet	INC	S. Senthil Kumaran	ADMK	Vaiyapuri Manikandan
Puducherry	14	Raj Bhavan	DMK	S. P. Sivakumar	AINRC	K. Lakshminarayanan
Puducherry	15	Oupalam	DMK	V. Annibal Kennedy	ADMK	A. Anbalagan
Puducherry	16	Orleampeth	DMK	S. Gopal	ADMK	Omsakthi Sekar
Puducherry	17	Nellithope	DMK	V. Karthikeyan	BJP	Richards Johnkumar
Puducherry	18	Mudaliarpet	DMK	L. Sambath	ADMK	A. Baskar
Puducherry	19	Ariankuppam	INC	T. Jayamurthy	AINRC	R. Baskar Datchanamourtty
Puducherry	20	Manavely	INC	R. K. R. Anantharaman	BJP	Embalam R. Selvam
Puducherry	21	Embalam (SC)	INC	M. Kandassamy	AINRC	U. Lakshmikandhan
Puducherry	22	Nettapakkam (SC)	INC	V. Vijayaveny	AINRC	P. Rajavelu
Puducherry	23	Bahour	DMK	R. Senthilkumar	AINRC	N. Danavelu
Karaikal	24	Nedungadu (SC)	INC	A. Marimuthu	AINRC	Chandira Priyanga
Karaikal	25	Thirunallar	INC	R. Kamalakannan	BJP	G. N. S. Rajasekaran
Karaikal	26	Karaikal North	INC	A. V. Subramanian	AINRC	P. R. N. Thirumurugan
Karaikal	27	Karaikal South	DMK	A.M.H. Nazeem	ADMK	K. A. U. Asana
Karaikal	28	Neravy T R Pattinam	DMK	M. Nagathiyagarajan	BJP	V. M. C. S. Manokaran
Mahe	29	Mahe	INC	Ramesh Parambath	AINRC	V. P. Abdul Rahman
Yanam	30	Yanam	IND	Gollapalli Srinivas Ashok	AINRC	N. Rangaswamy

== Polls and surveys ==
=== Opinion polls ===
Date	Polling agency				Lead
Date	Polling agency	AINRC+	UPA	Others	Lead
3 April 2021	Thanthi TV	21-27	3-9	0	12-24
24 March 2021	Patriotic Voter	17-18	10-12	0-3	6
15 March 2021	ABP News–CVoter	16-20	10-14	0	2-10
8 March 2021	Times Now–CVoter	18	12	0	6
1 March 2021	Patriotic Voter	19	11	0	8

=== Exit polls ===
Date published	Polling agency				Lead
Date published	Polling agency	AINRC+	UPA	Others	Lead
29 April 2021	Republic TV–CNX	16-20	11-13	-	5-7
29 April 2021	Patriotic Voter	18	12	-	6
29 April 2021	ABP News–CVoter	19-23	6-10	1-2	9-17

== Voter Turnout ==
Turnout
District	Vote %
Karaikal	80.07
Mahé	73.53
Puducherry	82.01
Yanam	91.27
Total	83.42

== Result ==
16	9	5
AINRC+	UPA	IND

Vote share by alliance
1. AINRC+ (43.6%)
2. UPA (37.9%)
3. Others (18.5%)
Seat share by alliance
1. AINRC+ (53.3%)
2. UPA (30.0%)
3. IND (16.7%)

Party	Votes	Vote %	Swing	Conts	Won	Change
All India N.R. Congress	216,249	25.85	▼2.3	16	10	▲2
Dravida Munnetra Kazhagam	154,858	18.51	▲9.6	13	6	▲4
Indian National Congress	131,393	15.71	▼14.9	14	2	▼13
Bharatiya Janata Party	114,298	13.66	▲11.3	9	6	▲6
Independents	106,098	12.68			6	▲5
Others	86,159	9.6	Steady	56	0	Steady
None of the above	10,803	1.29	▼0.4			
Total	836,562	100		30	30	
Valid votes	836,562	99.88				
Invalid votes	981	0.12				
Votes cast / turnout	837,543	83.42				
Registered voters	1,004,507					
Source:Election Commission of India

=== Results by party and alliance ===
Source
AINRC+	Seats	UPA	Seats	Others	Seats
AINRC	10	INC	2	IND	6
BJP	6	DMK	6		
Total	16	Total	8	Total	6
Change	▲5	Change	▼9	Change	▲4

=== Results by district ===
District	Seats			
District	Seats	NRC+	UPA	IND
Puducherry	23	14	5	4
Karaikal	5	2	2	1
Mahe	1	0	1	0
Yanam	1	0	1	0
Total	30	16	9	5

=== Results by constituency ===
Keys: AINRC (10) BJP (6) DMK (6) INC (2) IND (6)

Results
District	Constituency			Winner				Runner Up				Margin	%
District	#	Name	Poll %	Candidate	Party	Votes	%	Candidate	Party	Votes	%	Margin	%
Puducherry	1	Mannadipet	89.10%	A. Namassivayam	BJP	14,939	51.82	A. Krishnan	DMK	12,189	42.28	2,750	9.54
Puducherry	2	Thirubhuvanai	87.61%	P. Angalane	IND	10,597	36.78	B. Kobiga	AINRC	8,238	28.60	2,359	8.18
Puducherry	3	Oussudu	89.50%	A. K. Saravanankumar	BJP	14,121	48.78	P. Karthikeyan	INC	12,241	42.29	1,880	6.49
Puducherry	4	Mangalam	87.75%	C. Djeacoumar	AINRC	16,972	50.89	Sun. Kumaravel	DMK	14,221	42.64	2,751	8.25
Puducherry	5	Villianur	83.08%	R. Siva	DMK	19,653	55.73	S. V. Sugumaran	AINRC	12,703	36.02	6,950	19.71
Puducherry	6	Ozhukarai	77.83%	M. Sivasankar	IND	11,940	36.50	N. G. Pannir Selvam	AINRC	11,121	34.00	819	2.50
Puducherry	7	Kadirgamam	78.04%	S. Ramesh	AINRC	17,775	65.82	P. Selvanadane	INC	5,529	20.47	12,246	45.35
Puducherry	8	Indira Nagar	82.04%	A. K. D. Arumugam	AINRC	21,841	74.77	M. Kannan	INC	3,310	11.33	18,531	63.44
Puducherry	9	Thattanchavady	76.89%	N. Rangasamy	AINRC	12,978	55.02	K. Sethu Selvam	CPI	7,522	31.89	5,456	23.13
Puducherry	10	Kamaraj Nagar	78.65%	A. Johnkumar	BJP	16,687	56.11	M. O. H. F. Shahjahan	INC	9,458	31.80	7,229	24.31
Puducherry	11	Lawspet	80.67%	M. Vaithianathan	INC	14,592	55.60	V. Saminathan	BJP	8,891	33.88	5,701	21.72
Puducherry	12	Kalapet	85.87%	Kalyanasundaram	BJP	13,277	44.63	A. Senthil Ramesh	IND	9,769	32.84	3,508	11.79
Puducherry	13	Muthialpet	78.64%	J. Prakash Kumar	IND	8,778	37.48	Vaiyapuri Manikandan	ADMK	7,844	33.49	934	3.99
Puducherry	14	Raj Bhavan	73.93%	K. Lakshminarayanan	AINRC	10,096	51.86	S. P. Sivakumar	DMK	6,364	32.69	3,732	19.17
Puducherry	15	Oupalam	85.06%	Annibal Kennedy	DMK	13,433	56.64	A. Anbalagan	ADMK	8,653	36.48	4,780	20.16
Puducherry	16	Orleampeth	81.95%	G. Nehru Kuppusamy	IND	9,580	47.29	S. Gopal	DMK	7,487	36.96	2,093	10.33
Puducherry	17	Nellithope	82.56%	Richards Johnkumar	BJP	11,757	42.26	V. Cartigueyane	DMK	11,261	40.47	496	1.79
Puducherry	18	Mudaliarpet	83.01%	L. Sambath	DMK	15,151	51.30	A. Baskar	ADMK	10,972	37.15	4,179	14.15
Puducherry	19	Ariankuppam	84.23%	R. Baskar	AINRC	17,858	54.32	T. Djeamourthy	INC	11,440	34.80	6,418	19.52
Puducherry	20	Manavely	86.74%	Embalam R. Selvam	BJP	17,225	57.54	R. K. R. Anantharaman	INC	9,093	30.37	8,132	27.17
Puducherry	21	Embalam (SC)	88.76%	U. Lakshmikandhan	AINRC	15,624	50.85	M. Candassamy	INC	13,384	43.56	2,240	7.29
Puducherry	22	Nettapakkam (SC)	86.93%	P. Rajavelu	AINRC	15,978	56.82	V. Vizeaveny	INC	9,340	33.21	6,638	23.61
Puducherry	23	Bahour	89.60%	R. Senthilkumar	DMK	11,789	44.56	N. Dhanavelou	AINRC	11,578	43.76	211	0.80
Karaikal	24	Nedungadu (SC)	84.92%	S. Chandra Priyanga	AINRC	10,774	40.20	A. Marimuthu	INC	8,560	31.94	2,214	8.26
Karaikal	25	Thirunallar	85.93%	P. R. Siva	IND	9,796	36.45	S. Rajasekaran	BJP	8,416	31.32	1,380	5.13
Karaikal	26	Karaikal North	79.43%	P. R. N. Thirumurugan	AINRC	12,704	44.85	A. V. Subramanian	INC	12,569	44.38	135	0.47
Karaikal	27	Karaikal South	76.54%	A. M. H. Nazeem	DMK	17,401	71.15	K. A. U. Assana	ADMK	5,367	21.95	12,034	49.20
Karaikal	28	Neravy-T.R.Pattinam	83.40%	M. Nagathiyagarajan	DMK	14,496	55.74	V. M. C. S. Manoharen	BJP	8,985	34.55	5,511	21.19
Mahe	29	Mahe	75.29%	Ramesh Parambath	INC	9,744	41.63	N. Haridasan Master	IND	9,444	40.35	300	1.28
Yanam	30	Yanam	92.31%	Gollapalli Srinivas Ashok	IND	17,132	49.07	N. Rangasamy	AINRC	16,477	47.20	655	1.87

== Government formation ==
As the AINRC+ achieved a majority in the elections, the AINRC–BJP combine formed the next government. The lieutenant governor appointed three members to the assembly, all of whom belonged to the BJP, raising its count to nine in the assembly. Furthermore, the six independent members pledged support to the government, increasing its strength to 25 in the 33-member assembly. Rangaswamy was sworn in as the chief minister of Puducherry for the fourth time on 7 May 2021. On 8 June, the alliance announced that the BJP would get two ministers and the post of the assembly speaker, while AINRC got three ministers.

== See also ==
- 2021 elections in India
- 2021 Tamil Nadu Legislative Assembly election
- 2019 Indian general election in Puducherry
