= 2019 Indian general election in Puducherry =

Indian lower house election in Puducherry

- April 18, 2019 (2nd phase)

1 seat
- Turnout: 81.20 (▼0.90)
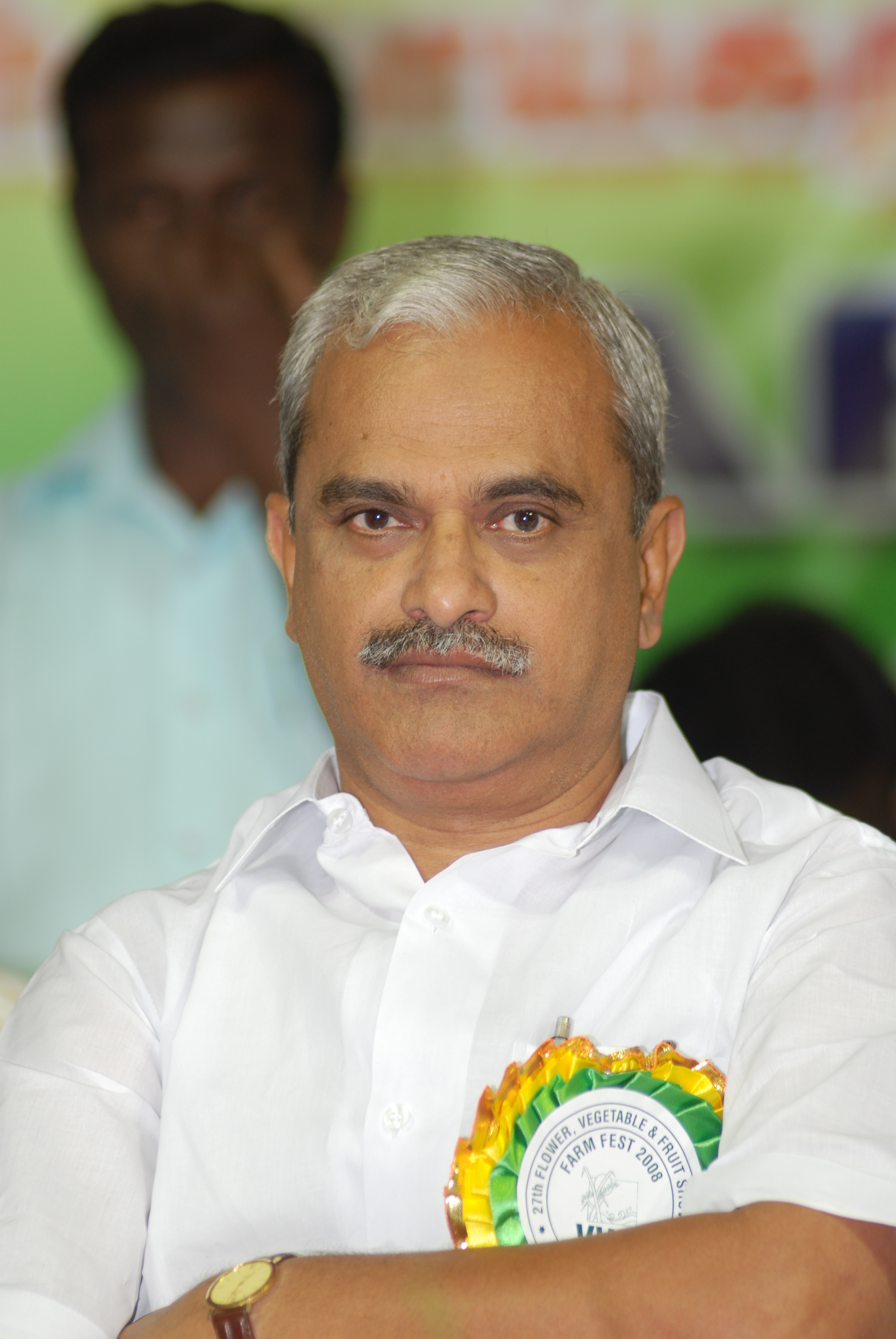

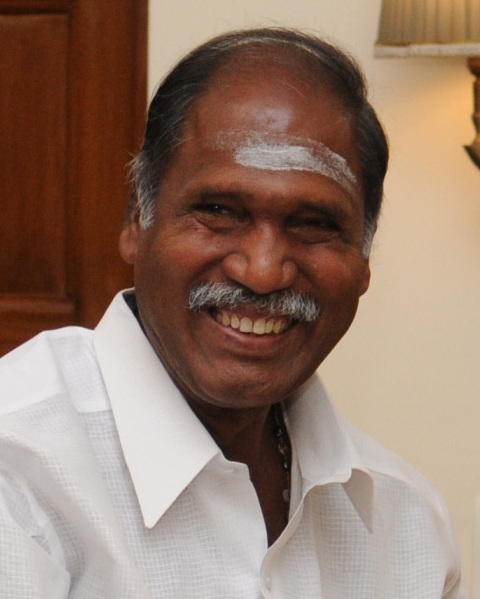
	First party	Second party
Leader	V. Vaithilingam	N. Rangaswamy
Party	INC	AINRC
Alliance	UPA+DPA	NDA
Last election	0	1
Seats won	1	0
Seat change	▲1	▼1
Popular vote	4,44,981	2,47,956
Percentage	56.27%	31.36%
Swing	▲29.92%	▼3.21%
Prime Minister before election
Narendra Modi
BJP
Prime Minister after election
Narendra Modi
BJP

The 2019 Indian general elections was held in seven phases from 11 April to 19 May 2019 to constitute the 17th Lok Sabha. The general election in Puducherry was held on April 18, 2019. The UPA, fielded V. Vaithilingam, of the Indian National Congress, while the National Democratic Alliance fielded AINRC candidate Dr. K. Narayanasamy.

== Candidates ==
Constituency					
Constituency		NDA		UPA	
1	Puducherry	AINRC	Dr. K. Narayanaswamy	INC	V. Vaithilingam

== Detailed Results ==
Party Name	Popular vote			Seats		
Party Name	Votes	%	±pp	Contested	Won	+/−
INC	4,44,981	56.26	▲29.92	1	1	▲1
AINRC	2,47,956	31.35	▼3.21	1	0	▼1
Others	69,998	8.85	Steady	8	0	Steady
IND	15,626	1.98	Steady	8	0	Steady
NOTA	12,199	1.54	Steady			
Total	7,90,760	100%	-	18	1	-

== Assembly Segment Wise Lead ==
Party	Assembly segments	Position in Assembly (as of 2021 election)
Indian National Congress	29	2
All India N.R. Congress	1	10
Total	30	

=== Constituency Wise ===
Constituency		Winner			Runner-up			Margin
#	Name	Candidate	Party	Votes	Candidate	Party	Votes	Margin
1	Mannadipet	V. Vaithilingam	INC	14,613	K. Narayanaswamy	AINRC	10,753	3,860
2	Thirubhuvanai	V. Vaithilingam	INC	14,050	K. Narayanaswamy	AINRC	11,260	2,790
3	Oussudu	V. Vaithilingam	INC	15,146	K. Narayanaswamy	AINRC	9,423	5,723
4	Mangalam	V. Vaithilingam	INC	14,941	K. Narayanaswamy	AINRC	12,939	2,002
5	Villianur	V. Vaithilingam	INC	21,124	K. Narayanaswamy	AINRC	7,733	13,391
6	Ozhukarai	V. Vaithilingam	INC	19,471	K. Narayanaswamy	AINRC	7,024	12,447
7	Kadirgamam	V. Vaithilingam	INC	12,135	K. Narayanaswamy	AINRC	10,305	1,830
8	Indira Nagar	K. Narayanaswamy	AINRC	13,361	V. Vaithilingam	INC	11,887	1,474
9	Thattanchavady	V. Vaithilingam	INC	10,532	K. Narayanaswamy	AINRC	9,194	1,338
10	Kamaraj Nagar	V. Vaithilingam	INC	15,949	K. Narayanaswamy	AINRC	5,958	9,991
11	Lawspet	V. Vaithilingam	INC	14,041	K. Narayanaswamy	AINRC	6,672	7,369
12	Kalapet	V. Vaithilingam	INC	13,780	K. Narayanaswamy	AINRC	10,647	3,133
13	Muthialpet	V. Vaithilingam	INC	11,952	K. Narayanaswamy	AINRC	6,624	5,328
14	Raj Bhavan	V. Vaithilingam	INC	12,308	K. Narayanaswamy	AINRC	4,444	7,864
15	Oupalam	V. Vaithilingam	INC	12,430	K. Narayanaswamy	AINRC	6,819	5,611
16	Orleampeth	V. Vaithilingam	INC	11,029	K. Narayanaswamy	AINRC	5,433	5,596
17	Nellithope	V. Vaithilingam	INC	18,096	K. Narayanaswamy	AINRC	4,950	13,146
18	Mudaliarpet	V. Vaithilingam	INC	11,161	K. Narayanaswamy	AINRC	10,819	342
19	Ariankuppam	V. Vaithilingam	INC	16,757	K. Narayanaswamy	AINRC	9,609	7,148
20	Manavely	V. Vaithilingam	INC	15,310	K. Narayanaswamy	AINRC	9,736	5,574
21	Embalam	V. Vaithilingam	INC	17,047	K. Narayanaswamy	AINRC	9,850	7,197
22	Nettapakkam	V. Vaithilingam	INC	16,659	K. Narayanaswamy	AINRC	8,962	7,697
23	Bahour	V. Vaithilingam	INC	11,634	K. Narayanaswamy	AINRC	10,607	1,027
24	Nedungadu	V. Vaithilingam	INC	16,254	K. Narayanaswamy	AINRC	6,399	9,855
25	Thirunallar	V. Vaithilingam	INC	14,799	K. Narayanaswamy	AINRC	7,734	7,065
26	Karaikal North	V. Vaithilingam	INC	15,326	K. Narayanaswamy	AINRC	7,429	7,897
27	Karaikal South	V. Vaithilingam	INC	17,181	K. Narayanaswamy	AINRC	3,439	13,742
28	Neravy T.R. Pattinam	V. Vaithilingam	INC	14,735	K. Narayanaswamy	AINRC	6,278	8,457
29	Mahe	V. Vaithilingam	INC	12,721	K. Narayanaswamy	AINRC	4,746	7,975
30	Yanam	V. Vaithilingam	INC	21,578	K. Narayanaswamy	AINRC	8,697	12,881
