= 2016 Puducherry Legislative Assembly election =

Union territory election in India

- 16 May 2016

All 30 seats in the Puducherry Legislative Assembly 16 seats needed for a majority
- Turnout: 85.08% (▼1.11%)
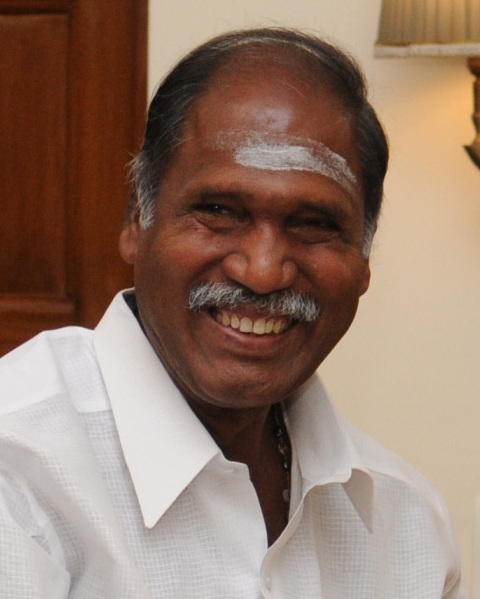
	Majority party	Minority party
Leader	A. K. D. Arumugam	N. Rangaswamy
Party	INC	AINRC
Alliance	UPA+DPA	AINRC+
Leader's seat	Indira Nagar(lost)	Indira Nagar(won)
Last election	25.06%, 7 seats	31.75%, 15 seats
Seats won	15	8
Seat change	▲8	▼7
Popular vote	244,886	225,082
Percentage	30.6%	28.1%
Swing	▲5.54%	▼3.65%
Chief Minister before election
N. Rangaswamy
AINRC
Elected Chief Minister
V. Narayanasamy
INC

The legislative assembly election in the Indian union territory of Puducherry was held on 16 May 2016 to elect members of the 30 constituencies in the non-contiguous territory to constitute the Fourteenth Puducherry Legislative Assembly.

== Background ==
It is a legal requirement that the election must be held at an interval of five years, or earlier if the assembly is dissolved by the President. The previous election was conducted on 13 April 2011 and its term would have naturally expired on 2 June 2016. The election was organised and conducted by the Election Commission of India (ECI).

The Indian National Congress and the Dravidia Munnetra Kazhagam were in an alliance and contested 21 and 9 seats respectively. Ruling AINRC, BJP & AIADMK will contest separately.

The polling booths in three Assembly constituencies in Puducherry (out of total 30 segments) were equipped with Voter-verified paper audit trail (VVPAT) machines along with EVMs.

Assembly constituencies of Puducherry having VVPAT facility with EVMs
Oupalam
Orleampeth
Karaikal South

== Parties and alliances ==
=== Prominent Parties ===
Party/Alliance		Flag	Electoral symbol	Leader	Seats contested
United Progressive Alliance	Indian National Congress			V. Narayanasamy	21
United Progressive Alliance	Dravida Munnetra Kazhagam			R. Siva	9
All India N.R. Congress				N. Rangaswamy	30
All India Anna Dravida Munnetra Kazhagam				A. Anbalagan	30

=== Other Parties ===
Party		Flag	Electoral symbol	Seats contested
Bharatiya Janata Party				30
Pattali Makkal Katchi				24
PWF	Desiya Murpokku Dravida Kazhagam			6
PWF	Communist Party of India			7
PWF	Communist Party of India (Marxist)			4
PWF	Viduthalai Chiruthaigal Katchi			5
PWF	Marumalarchi Dravida Munnetra Kazhagam			5
Indiya Jananayaka Katchi				22
Independent politician				96

NOTE: A total of 374 candidates (including independents) were in the fray for the election, of whom 305 forfeited their deposits.

== Candidates ==
District	#	Constituency	UPA		AINRC		AIADMK	
District	#	Constituency	Party	Candidate	Party	Candidate	Party	Candidate
Puducherry	1	Mannadipet	DMK	A. Krishnan	AINRC	T. P. R. Selvame	ADMK	Mahadevi
Puducherry	2	Thirubuvanai (SC)	INC	P. Angalane	AINRC	B. Kobiga	ADMK	M. Sankar Vadivelan
Puducherry	3	Ossudu (SC)	INC	E. Theeppainthan	AINRC	M. Vaithianathan	ADMK	M. Selvarassou
Puducherry	4	Mangalam	DMK	S. Kumaravel	AINRC	S. V. Sugumaran	ADMK	K. Natarajan
Puducherry	5	Villianur	INC	A. Namassivayam	AINRC	Jayakumar	ADMK	V. Subramanian
Puducherry	6	Ozhukarai	INC	M. N. R. Balan	AINRC	N. G. Pannirselvam	ADMK	M. Sivasankar
Puducherry	7	Kadirkamam	INC	A. Sivashanmugam	AINRC	N. S. J. Jayabal Ayyanar	ADMK	M. R. Govindan
Puducherry	8	Indira Nagar	INC	A. K. D. Arumugam	AINRC	N. Rangaswamy	ADMK	T. Gunasegaran
Puducherry	9	Thattanchavady	DMK	N. Kaliaperumal	AINRC	Ashok Anand	ADMK	S. Cassinadin
Puducherry	10	Kamaraj Nagar	INC	V. Vaithilingam	AINRC	B. Thayalan	ADMK	P. Ganesan
Puducherry	11	Lawspet	INC	V. P. Sivakolundhu	AINRC	Nandha T. Saravanan	ADMK	G. Anbanandam
Puducherry	12	Kalapet	INC	M. O. H. F. Shahjahan	AINRC	N. Viswanathan	ADMK	V. C. Ezhumalai
Puducherry	13	Muthialpet	DMK	S. P. Sivakumar	AINRC	J. Prakash Kumar	ADMK	Vaiyapuri Manikandan
Puducherry	14	Raj Bhavan	INC	K. Lakshminarayanan	AINRC	A. Annibal Nehru	ADMK	P. Kannan
Puducherry	15	Oupalam	DMK	Annibal Kennedy	AINRC	N. Anand	ADMK	A. Anbalagan
Puducherry	16	Orleampeth	DMK	R. Siva	AINRC	G. Nehru Kuppusamy	ADMK	A. Ravindran
Puducherry	17	Nellithope	INC	A. Johnkumar	AINRC	D. Balaji	ADMK	Omsakthi Sekar
Puducherry	18	Mudaliarpet	DMK	Suresh	AINRC	V. Balan	ADMK	A. Baskar
Puducherry	19	Ariankuppam	INC	T. Djeamourthy	AINRC	V. Sabapathy	ADMK	M. A. S. Subramanian
Puducherry	20	Manavely	INC	R. K. R. Anantharaman	AINRC	G. Suresh	ADMK	P. Purushothaman
Puducherry	21	Embalam (SC)	INC	M. Candassamy	AINRC	U. Lakshmikandhan	ADMK	K. Govindharasu
Puducherry	22	Nettapakkam (SC)	INC	V. Vizeaveny	AINRC	P. Rajavelu	ADMK	L. Periasamy
Puducherry	23	Bahour	INC	N. Danavelou	AINRC	T. Thiagarajan	ADMK	P. Velmurugan
Karaikal	24	Nedungadu (SC)	INC	A. Marimottou	AINRC	Chandira Priyanga	ADMK	G. Panneer Selvam
Karaikal	25	Thirunallar	INC	R. Kamalakannan	AINRC	P. R. Siva Sivasakthi	ADMK	G. Murugaiyan
Karaikal	26	Karaikal North	INC	R. P. Chandramohan	AINRC	P. R. N. Thirumurugan	ADMK	M. V. Omalingam
Karaikal	27	Karaikal South	DMK	A. M. H. Nazeem	AINRC	A. Suresh	ADMK	K. A. U. Asana
Karaikal	28	Neravy T. R. Pattinam	DMK	A. Geetha	AINRC	K. R. Udayakumar	ADMK	V. M. C. Sivakumar
Mahe	29	Mahe	INC	E. Valsaraj	AINRC	V. P. Abdul Rahman	ADMK	C. K. Bhaskaran
Yanam	30	Yanam	INC	Malladi Krishna Rao	AINRC	Tirikoty Bairava Swamy	ADMK	M. Satya Sai Kumar

== Voting ==
The election was held on 16 May 2016 in a single phase and 84.11% voting was recorded. The votes were counted on 19 May and results were declared on same day.

== Result ==
Parties and Coalitions	Votes	Vote %	Vote swing	Contested	Won	Change
Indian National Congress	2,44,886	30.6	▲5.54	21	15	▲8
All India N.R. Congress	2,25,082	28.1	▼3.65	30	8	▼7
All India Anna Dravida Munnetra Kazhagam	134,597	16.8	▲3.05	30	4	▼1
Dravida Munnetra Kazhagam	70,836	8.9	▼1.78	9	2	Steady
Bharatiya Janata Party	19,303	2.4	▲1.08	30	0	Steady
Independents	62,884	7.9	–		1	Steady
None of the above	13,240	1.7	–	–	–	–
Total	8,00,343				30	
Valid votes	8,00,343	99.86				
Invalid votes	1,099	0.14				
Votes cast / turnout	8,01,442	85.08				
Abstentions	1,43,490	14.92				
Registered voters	9,41,935					
Source: International Business Times

=== Results by District ===
District	Seats				
District	Seats	UPA	NRC	ADK	IND
Puducherry	23	14	6	3	0
Karaikal	5	2	2	1	0
Mahe	1	0	0	0	1
Yanam	1	1	0	0	0
Total	30	17	8	4	1

== Results by constituency ==
District	Constituency		Winner				Runner Up				Margin	%
District	#	Name	Candidate	Party	Votes	%	Candidate	Party	Votes	%	Margin	%
Puducherry	1	Mannadipet	T. P. R. Selvame	AINRC	7,679	27.86	A. Krishnan	DMK	7,260	26.34	419	1.52
Puducherry	2	Thirubhuvanai (SC)	B. Kobiga	AINRC	12,143	44.73	P. Angalane	INC	10,711	39.45	1,432	5.28
Puducherry	3	Oussudu (SC)	E. Theeppainthan	INC	8,675	33.02	Sai Saravanan Kumar	BJP	6,345	24.15	2,330	8.87
Puducherry	4	Mangalam	S. V. Sugumaran	AINRC	13,955	44.61	S. Kumaravel	DMK	8,392	26.83	5,563	17.78
Puducherry	5	Villianur	A. Namassivayam	INC	18,009	57.11	Jayakumar	AINRC	9,728	30.85	8,281	26.26
Puducherry	6	Ozhukarai	M. N. R. Balan	INC	14,703	47.68	N. G. Pannirselvam	AINRC	7,596	24.63	7,107	23.05
Puducherry	7	Kadirgamam	Jayabal Ayyanar	AINRC	11,690	43.28	S. Ramesh	IND	7,888	29.20	3,802	14.08
Puducherry	8	Indira Nagar	N. Rangaswamy	AINRC	15,463	52.69	A. K. D. Arumugam	INC	12,059	41.09	3,404	11.60
Puducherry	9	Thattanchavady	Ashok Anand	AINRC	12,754	53.90	K. Sethu Sethuselvam	CPI	5,296	22.38	7,458	31.52
Puducherry	10	Kamaraj Nagar	V. Vaithilingam	INC	11,618	45.09	P. Ganesan	ADMK	6,512	25.27	5,106	19.82
Puducherry	11	Lawspet	V. P. Sivakolundhu	INC	12,144	46.92	M. Vaithianathan	IND	5,695	22.00	6,449	24.92
Puducherry	12	Kalapet	M. O. H. F. Shahjahan	INC	9,839	35.09	Kalyanasundaram	IND	9,205	32.83	634	2.26
Puducherry	13	Muthialpet	Vaiyapuri Manikandan	ADMK	9,257	39.21	J. Prakash Kumar	AINRC	7,093	30.04	2,164	9.17
Puducherry	14	Raj Bhavan	K. Lakshminarayanan	INC	9,445	47.23	P. Kannan	ADMK	7,220	36.11	2,225	11.12
Puducherry	15	Oupalam	A. Anbalagan	ADMK	9,411	39.97	Annibal Kennedy	DMK	8,503	36.11	908	3.86
Puducherry	16	Orleampeth	R. Siva	DMK	11,110	53.82	G. Nehru Kuppusamy	AINRC	8,130	39.38	2,980	14.44
Puducherry	17	Nellithope	A. Johnkumar	INC	18,506	69.16	Omsakthi Sekar	ADMK	6,365	23.79	12,141	45.37
Puducherry	18	Mudaliarpet	A. Baskar	ADMK	14,321	49.79	V. Balan	AINRC	8,934	31.06	5,387	18.73
Puducherry	19	Ariankuppam	T. Djeamourthy	INC	14,029	45.29	M. A. S. Subramanian	ADMK	7,458	24.08	6,571	21.21
Puducherry	20	Manavely	R.K.R. Anantharaman	INC	9,326	34.03	G. Suresh	AINRC	6,611	24.12	2,715	9.91
Puducherry	21	Embalam (SC)	M. Candassamy	INC	18,945	66.08	U. Lakshmikandhan	AINRC	7,745	27.02	11,200	39.06
Puducherry	22	Nettapakkam (SC)	V. Vizeaveny	INC	10,577	38.96	P. Rajavelu	AINRC	9,109	33.56	1,468	5.40
Puducherry	23	Bahour	N. Danavelou	INC	11,278	45.70	T. Thiagarajan	AINRC	8,471	34.32	2,807	11.38
Karaikal	24	Nedungadu (SC)	Chandira Priyanga	AINRC	8,789	34.48	A. Marimottou	INC	7,695	30.19	1,094	4.29
Karaikal	25	Thirunallar	R. Kamalakannan	INC	13,138	51.30	P. R. Siva Sivasakthi	AINRC	10,263	40.07	2,875	11.23
Karaikal	26	Karaikal North	P. R. N. Thirumurugan	AINRC	13,139	49.39	M. V. Omalingam	ADMK	9,841	36.99	3,298	12.40
Karaikal	27	Karaikal South	K. A. U. Asana	ADMK	11,104	46.66	A. M. H. Nazeem	DMK	11,084	46.57	20	0.09
Karaikal	28	Neravy T.R. Pattinam	A. Geetha	DMK	14,993	60.19	V. M. C. Sivakumar	ADMK	8,057	32.34	6,936	27.85
Mahe	29	Mahe	V. Ramachandran	IND	10,797	45.99	E. Valsaraj	INC	8,658	36.88	2,139	9.11
Yanam	30	Yanam	Malladi Krishna Rao	INC	20,801	61.36	Tirikoty Bairava Swamy	AINRC	12,047	35.54	8,754	25.82

== By-polls (2016–2021) ==
S.No	Date	Constituency	Reason	MLA before election	Party before election	Elected MLA	Party after election
17	19 November 2016	Nellithope	(Note: V. Narayanasamy was appointed Chief Minister of Puducherry in May 2016 despite not contesting the Assembly elections, after the Congress-led alliance won the polls. To comply with the constitutional requirement of becoming an MLA within six months, he contested and won the Nellithope by-election in November 2016, which was triggered by the resignation of the sitting MLA A. Johnkumar. He defeated AIADMK's Om Sakthi Sekar by a margin of approximately 11,150 votes, thereby securing his position as Chief Minister.)	A. Johnkumar	Indian National Congress	V. Narayanasamy	Indian National Congress
09	18 April 2019	Thattanchavady	(Note: The Thattanchavady Assembly by-election was held in 2019 after the sitting MLA, Ashok Anand of AINRC, was disqualified on November 8, 2018, following his conviction by a CBI court in a disproportionate assets case. The by-election was conducted on April 18, 2019, alongside the Lok Sabha polls. K. Venkatesan of the DMK won the seat.)	Ashok Anand	All India N.R. Congress	K. Venkatesan	Dravida Munnetra Kazhagam
10	21 October 2019	Kamraj Nagar	(Note: The Kamaraj Nagar by-election in 2019 was necessitated by the resignation of incumbent MLA and Speaker V. Vaithilingam, who vacated his Assembly seat after winning the Puducherry Lok Sabha constituency in the April 2019 general elections. The by-election was held on October 21, 2019, with results declared on October 24, 2019. Congress candidate A. John Kumar won the seat, defeating his AINRC rival by a margin of 7,170 votes.)	V. Vaithilingam	Indian National Congress	A. Johnkumar	Indian National Congress

== See also ==
- Elections in India
- 2016 elections in India
