= Ramesh (politician) =

Indian politician

Member of the Puducherry Legislative Assembly
- Incumbent
- Assumed office 2026
- Preceded by: P. M. L. Kalyanasundaram
- Constituency: Kalapet

Personal details
- Party: Dravida Munnetra Kazhagam
- Profession: Politician

Ramesh is an Indian politician and member of the Dravida Munnetra Kazhagam. He was elected as a Member of the Puducherry Legislative Assembly from the Kalapet constituency in the 2026 Puducherry Legislative Assembly election.
