= L. Sambath =

Indian politician

Leela Sagar Sambath (born 1981) is an Indian politician from Puducherry. He is a member of the Puducherry Legislative Assembly from Mudaliarpet Assembly constituency in Puducherry district. He won the 2021 Puducherry Legislative Assembly election representing the Dravida Munnetra Kazhagam.

== Early life and education ==
Sambath is from Mudaliarpet, Puducherry district, Puducherry. He is the son of Leela Sagar. He completed his BA and later did LLB in 2003 at Dr. Ambedkar Government Law Collage, Puducherry.

== Career ==
Sambath won from Mudaliarpet Assembly constituency representing the Dravida Munnetra Kazhagam in the 2021 Puducherry Legislative Assembly election. He polled 15,151 votes and defeated his nearest rival, A. Baskar of the All India Anna Dravida Munnetra Kazhagam, by a margin of 4,179 votes.
