= 2011 Puducherry Legislative Assembly election =

Indian union territory election

- 13 April 2011

All 30 seats to the Puducherry Legislative Assembly 16 seats needed for a majority
- Turnout: 86.19%
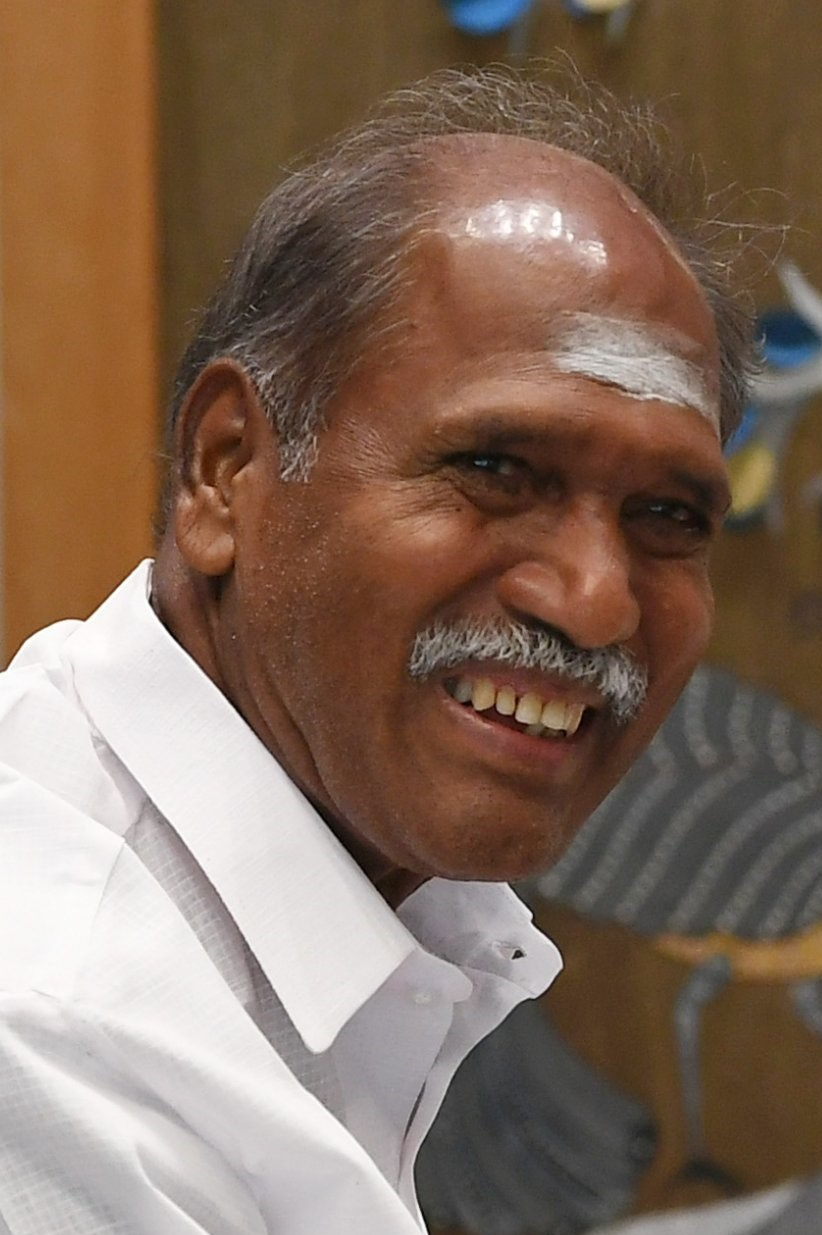

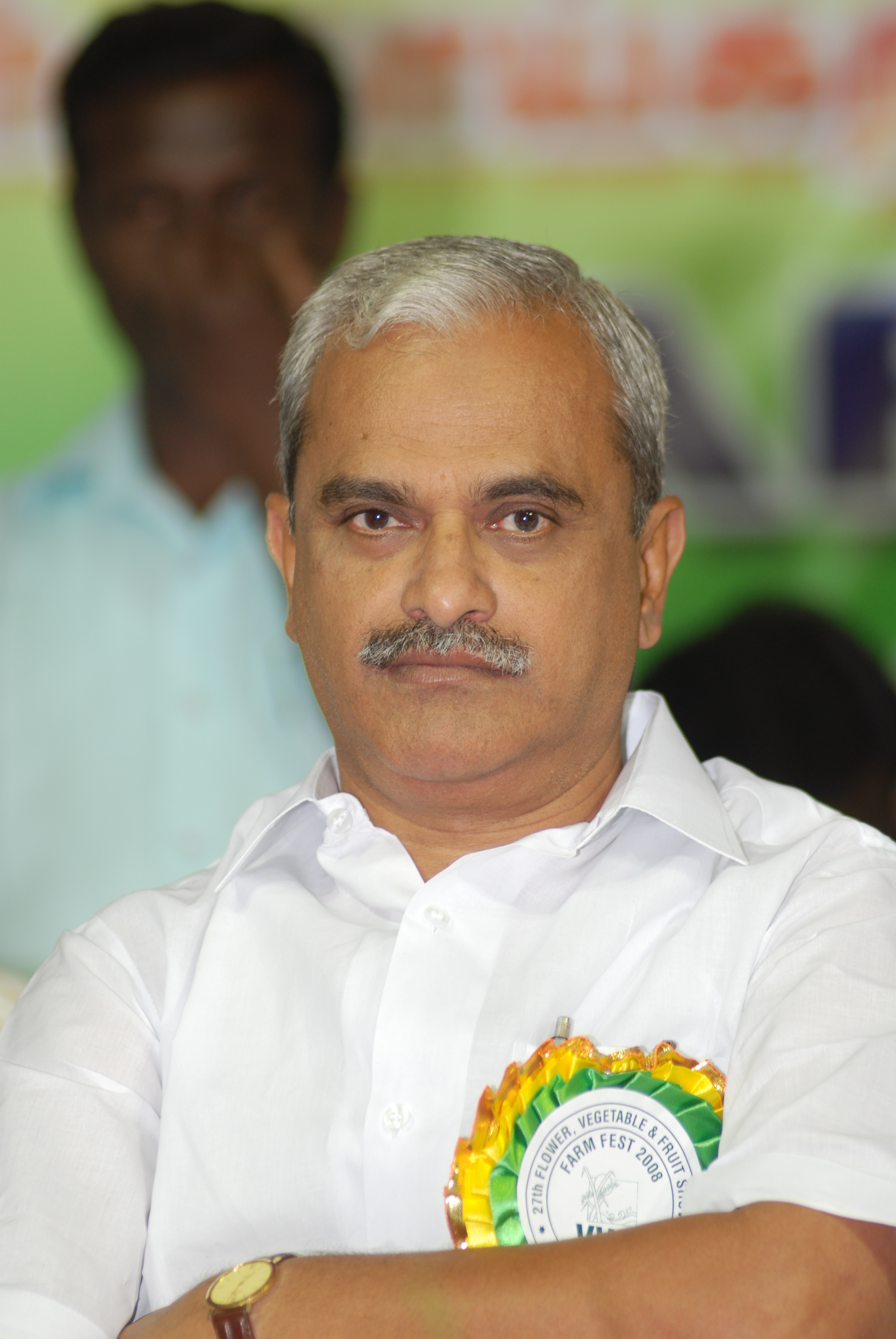
	First party	Second party
Leader	N. Rangaswamy	V. Vaithilingam
Party	AINRC	INC
Alliance	AINRC+	DPA+UPA
Leader since	7 February 2011	4 September 2008
Leader's seat	Kadirkamam (won); Indira Nagar (won)	Kamaraj Nagar
Last election	New	10
Seats before	New	10
Seats won	15	7
Seat change	Steady	▼3
Percentage	31.75%	25.06%
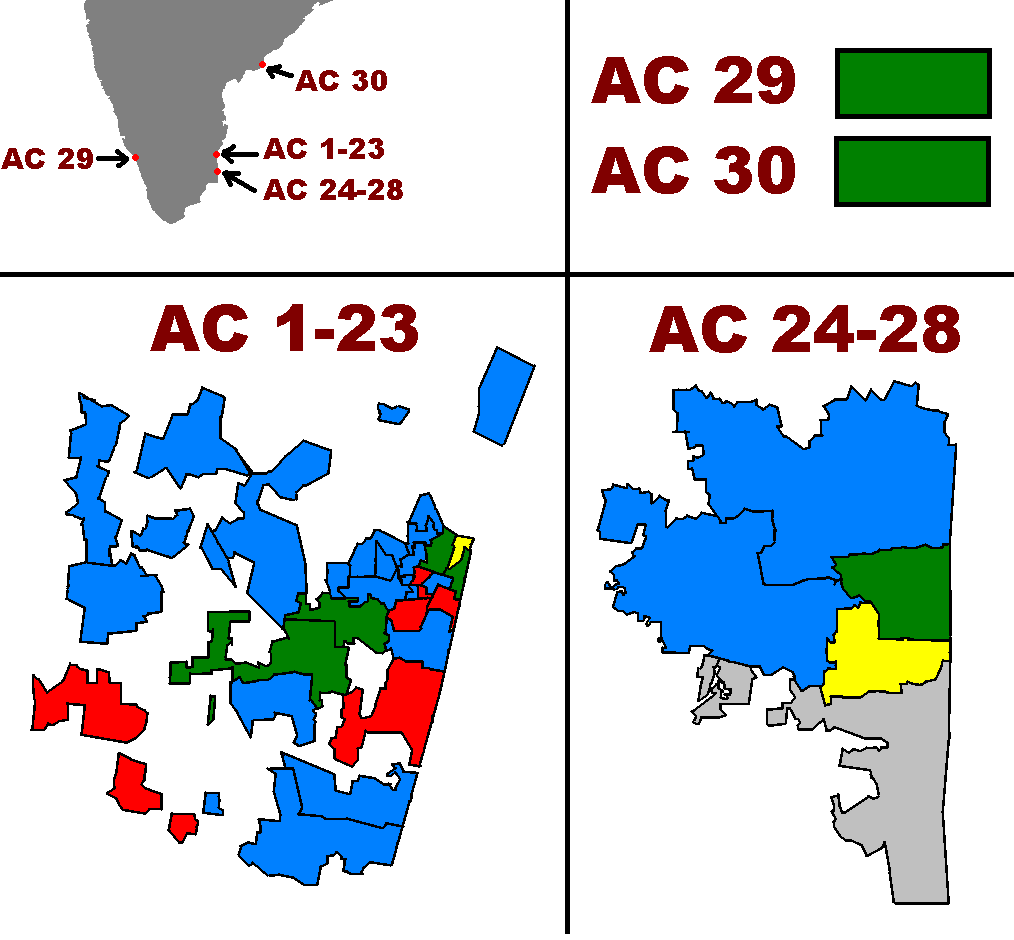
- Green = Indian National Congress, Red = All India Anna Dravida Munnetra Kazhagam, Yellow = Dravida Munnetra Kazhagam, Blue = All India N.R Congress, Grey = Independent
Chief Minister before election
V. Vaithilingam
INC
Elected Chief Minister
N. Rangaswamy
AINRC

A legislative assembly election was held in the Indian union territory of Puducherry on 13 April 2011 to elect members from thirty constituencies in the non-contiguous territory. This election was meant to constitute the Thirteenth Assembly of Pondicherry.

== Candidates ==
26 March 2011 marked the last day to complete nominations for the elections. 30 March 2011 was the last day for possible withdrawal of nominations. In total, 187 candidates contested the polls. In Yanam there was a total of ten candidates, the highest number in any constituency in this election. In the Indira Nagar constituency there were just two candidates, former chief minister N. Rangaswamy (who also contested the Kadirkamam constituency, this was the first time in the history of the territory that a candidate contested two different assembly constituencies) and Indian National Congress candidate A.K.D. Aroumougame. The counting of the votes was scheduled for 13 May 2011.

== Campaign ==
Amongst the contending parties, there were two major coalitions. On one side, there was an alliance backing the incumbent chief minister V. Vaithilingam, consisting of the Indian National Congress (which contested 17 seats), the Dravida Munnetra Kazhagam (10 seats), Pattali Makkal Katchi (2 seats) and the Viduthalai Chiruthaigal Katchi (1 seat). The other main bloc contesting the election was an alliance consisting of the All India N.R Congress of N. Rangaswamy (contesting 17 seats), the All India Anna Dravida Munnetra Kazhagam (10 seats), the Communist Party of India (Marxist) (1 seat), the Communist Party of India (1 seat) and the Desiya Murpokku Dravida Kazhagam (1 seat). A third force was the Bharatiya Janata Party, which did not align with any of the two big bloc and contested twenty seats on its own. There were also 78 independent candidates in the fray.

Several high-profile national politicians took part in the campaigning: Sonia Gandhi (president of the Indian National Congress), Rahul Gandhi (Indian National Congress general secretary), Pranab Mukherjee (Indian National Congress union minister), Nitin Gadkari (BJP president), Sushma Swaraj (BJP MP), Venkaiah Naidu (former BJP president), M. Karunanidhi (DMK chief minister of Tamil Nadu), J. Jayalalithaa (general secretary of AIADMK) and Vijayakanth (general secretary of DMDK).

== Election ==
Over 810,000 voters were eligible to take part in the polls.

== Parties and alliances ==
=== Prominent Parties ===
Party/Alliance		Flag	Electoral symbol	Leader	Seats contested
UPA (Note: In Nedungadu Constituency (24), no candidate was fielded by the INC, DMK, or PMK)	Indian National Congress			V. Vaithilingam	17
UPA	Dravida Munnetra Kazhagam			R. Siva	10
UPA	Pattali Makkal Katchi			S. Ramadoss	2
AINRC+	All India N.R. Congress			N. Rangaswamy	16+1 (Note: In Lawspet Constituency (11), both the AINRC and CPI(M) fielded candidates against each other.)
AINRC+	All India Anna Dravida Munnetra Kazhagam			A. Anbalagan	10
AINRC+	Desiya Murpokku Dravida Kazhagam			R. Selvaraj	1
AINRC+	Communist Party of India			Na. Ra. Kalainathan	1
AINRC+	Communist Party of India (Marxist)			V. Perumal	1+1

== List of Candidates ==
District	Constituency		UPA		AINRC+	
District	#	Name	Party	Candidate	Party	Candidate
Puducherry	1	Mannadipet	PMK	K. P. K. Arul Murugan	AINRC	T. P. R. Selvame
Puducherry	2	Thirubuvanai (SC)	INC	K. Jayaraj	AINRC	P. Angalane
Puducherry	3	Ossudu (SC)	DMK	A. Elumalai	AINRC	P. Karthikeyan
Puducherry	4	Mangalam	INC	C. Djeacoumar	AINRC	P. Anandabaskaran
Puducherry	5	Villianur	INC	A. Namassivayam	AINRC	K. Nadarajan
Puducherry	6	Ozhukarai	DMK	A. Johnkumar	AINRC	N.G. Pannirselvam
Puducherry	7	Kadirkamam	INC	V. Pethaperumal	AINRC	N. Rangaswamy
Puducherry	8	Indira Nagar	INC	V. Aroumougam	AINRC	N. Rangaswamy
Puducherry	9	Thattanchavady	DMK	A. Ilango	AINRC	Ashok Anand
Puducherry	10	Kamaraj Nagar	INC	V. Vaithilingam	CPI	Nara. Kalainathan
Puducherry	11	Lawspet	INC	V. P. Sivakolundhu	AINRC	M. Vaithianathan
Puducherry	12	Kalapet	INC	M. O. H. F. Shahjahan	AINRC	P. M. L. Kalyanasundaram
Puducherry	13	Muthialpet	DMK	Nandha. T. Saravanan	ADMK	A. Kasilingam
Puducherry	14	Raj Bhavan	INC	K. Lakshminarayan	ADMK	M. Saravanakumar
Puducherry	15	Oupalam	DMK	Annibal Kennedy	ADMK	A. Anbalagan
Puducherry	16	Orleampeth	DMK	R. Siva	AINRC	G. Nehru
Puducherry	17	Nellithope	DMK	R. V. Janakiraman	ADMK	Omsakthi Sekar
Puducherry	18	Mudaliarpet	DMK	M.A.S. Subramanian	ADMK	A. Baskar
Puducherry	19	Ariankuppam	INC	T. Djeamourthy	AINRC	V. Sabapathy
Puducherry	20	Manavely	PMK	R. K. R. Anantharaman	ADMK	P. Purushothaman
Puducherry	21	Embalam (SC)	INC	M. Candassamy	AINRC	P. Rajavelu
Puducherry	22	Nettapakkam (SC)	INC	S. Muthukumarasamy	ADMK	L. Periyasamy
Puducherry	23	Bahour	INC	R. Radhakrishnan	AINRC	T. Thiagarajan
Karaikal	24	Nedungadu (SC)			AINRC	M. Chandhrakasu
Karaikal	25	Thirunallar	INC	R. Kamalakannan	AINRC	P. R. Siva
Karaikal	26	Karaikal North	INC	P. R. N. Thirumurugan	ADMK	M. V. Omalingam
Karaikal	27	Karaikal South	DMK	A. M. H. Nazeem	DMDK	K. A. U. Asana
Karaikal	28	Neravy T R Pattinam	DMK	Anandan Geetha	ADMK	Er. M. Selvaraj
Mahe	29	Mahe	INC	E. Valsaraj	CPI(M)	T. K. Gangadharan
Yanam	30	Yanam	INC	Malladi Krishna Rao	ADMK	Manchala Satya Sai Kumar

== Results ==
Alliance	Party Name	Popular vote				Seats	
Alliance	Party Name	Votes	%	+/-	Contested	Won	+/-
AINRC+	All India N.R. Congress	2,21,552	31.75	New entry	16+1	15	New entry
AINRC+	All India Anna Dravida Munnetra Kazhagam	95,960	13.75	▼2.29	10	5	▲2
AINRC+	Desiya Murpokku Dravida Kazhagam	5,966	0.85	▼1.88	1	0	Steady
AINRC+	Communist Party of India	6,541	0.94	▼2.12	1	0	▼1
AINRC+	Communist Party of India (Marxist)	7,840	1.12	▼0.80	1+1	0	Steady
AINRC+	Total	3,37,859	48.41	Steady	29+1	20	Steady
UPA	Indian National Congress	1,85,149	26.53	▼3.38	17	7	▼3
UPA	Dravida Munnetra Kazhagam	74,552	10.68	▼1.91	10	2	▼5
UPA	Pattali Makkal Katchi	17,342	2.48	▼1.32	2	0	▼2
UPA	Total	2,77,043	39.69	Steady	29	9	Steady
Independent		70,595	10.12	▼3.80	79	1	▼2
Other Party Candidates		12,403	1.78	Steady	48	0	Steady
Total		6,97,900	100%	Steady	187	30	Steady

== Aftermath results ==
N. Rangasamy of AINRC, who won 15 seats, formed government without consulting the AIADMK and was accused of betraying the coalition by J. Jayalalithaa. AINRC secured a majority with the support of an independent V. M. C. Sivakumar. However, the AINRC's hastiness in forming the government and refusal to share power with pre-election alliance partner AIADMK proved costly in the subsequent elections in 2016.

== Results by constituency ==
District	Constituency		Winner				Runner-up				Margin	
District	Constituency		Candidate	Party	Votes	%	Candidate	Party	Votes	%	Votes	%
Puducherry	1	Mannadipet	T. P. R. Selvame	AINRC	12,412	49.56	K. P. K. Arul Murugan	PMK	7,696	30.73	4,716	18.83
Puducherry	2	Thirubhuvanai (SC)	P. Angalane	AINRC	13,733	59.02	K. Jayaraj	INC	8,965	38.53	4,768	20.49
Puducherry	3	Oussudu (SC)	P. Karthikeyan	AINRC	13,327	58.78	A. Elumalai	DMK	8,169	36.03	5,158	22.75
Puducherry	4	Mangalam	C. Djeacoumar	INC	14,052	52.59	P. Anandabaskaran	AINRC	11,759	44.01	2,293	8.58
Puducherry	5	Villianur	A. Namassivayam	INC	13,105	52.03	K. Nadarajan	AINRC	11,564	45.91	1,541	6.12
Puducherry	6	Ozhukarai	N. G. Pannir Selvam	AINRC	9,071	37.77	A. N. Balane	IND	7,505	31.25	1,566	6.52
Puducherry	7	Kadirgamam	N. Rangaswamy	AINRC	16,323	70.02	V. Pethaperumal	INC	6,566	28.16	9,757	41.86
Puducherry	8	Indira Nagar	N. Rangaswamy	AINRC	20,685	83.77	V. Aroumougam	INC	4,008	16.23	16,677	67.54
Puducherry	9	Thattanchavady	Ashok Anand	AINRC	14,597	67.99	N. Arjunan	IND	4,091	19.05	10,506	48.94
Puducherry	10	Kamaraj Nagar	V. Vaithilingam	INC	12,570	59.01	Nara Kalainathan	CPI	6,541	30.70	6,029	28.31
Puducherry	11	Lawspet	M. Vaithianathan	AINRC	10,189	51.79	V. P. Sivakolundhu	INC	4,757	24.18	5,432	27.61
Puducherry	12	Kalapet	P. M. L. Kalyanasundaram	AINRC	14,132	62.43	M. O. H. F. Shahjahan	INC	7,766	34.31	6,366	28.12
Puducherry	13	Muthialpet	Nandha. T. Saravanan	DMK	10,364	47.82	A. Kasilingam	ADMK	7,388	34.09	2,976	13.73
Puducherry	14	Raj Bhavan	K. Lakshminarayanan	INC	11,398	59.57	M. Saravanakumar	ADMK	4,327	22.62	7,071	36.95
Puducherry	15	Oupalam	A. Anbalagan	ADMK	9,536	42.59	N. Anand	IND	6,332	28.28	3,204	14.31
Puducherry	16	Orleampeth	G. Nehru Kuppusamy	AINRC	10,986	55.26	R. Siva	DMK	8,368	42.09	2,618	13.17
Puducherry	17	Nellithope	Omsakthi Sekar	ADMK	13,301	58.51	R. V. Janakiraman	DMK	8,783	38.63	4,518	19.88
Puducherry	18	Mudaliarpet	A. Baskar	ADMK	17,016	67.15	M. A. S. Subramanian	DMK	7,289	28.76	9,727	38.39
Puducherry	19	Ariankuppam	V. Sabapathy	AINRC	13,381	49.12	T. Djeamourthy	INC	10,750	39.47	2,631	9.65
Puducherry	20	Manavely	P. Purushothaman	ADMK	13,979	57.98	R. K. R. Anantharaman	PMK	9,646	40.01	4,333	17.97
Puducherry	21	Embalam (SC)	P. Rajavelu	AINRC	12,933	51.95	M. Candassamy	INC	11,465	46.06	1,468	5.89
Puducherry	22	Nettapakkam (SC)	L. Periyasamy	ADMK	14,686	59.80	S. Muthukumarasamy	INC	9,219	37.54	5,467	22.26
Puducherry	23	Bahour	T. Thiagarajan	AINRC	12,284	53.42	R. Radhakrishnan	INC	10,229	44.49	2,055	8.93
Karaikal	24	Nedungadu (SC)	M. Chandhrakasu	AINRC	12,474	55.05	A. Marimuthu	IND	4,984	22.00	7,490	33.05
Karaikal	25	Thirunallar	P. R. Siva	AINRC	11,702	50.77	R. Kamalakannan	INC	10,862	47.12	840	3.65
Karaikal	26	Karaikal North	P. R. N. Thirumurugan	INC	12,155	55.69	V. Omalingam	ADMK	8,795	40.29	3,360	15.40
Karaikal	27	Karaikal South	A. M. H. Nazeem	DMK	8,377	39.37	V. K. Ganapathy	IND	6,801	31.96	1,576	7.41
Karaikal	28	Neravy T.R. Pattinam	V. M. C. Sivakumar	IND	8,860	39.30	A. Geetha	DMK	8,502	37.72	358	1.58
Mahe	29	Mahe	E. Valsaraj	INC	13,297	60.51	T. K. Gangadharan	CPI(M)	7,193	32.73	6,104	27.78
Yanam	30	Yanam	Malladi Krishna Rao	INC	23,985	80.95	M. Satya Sai Kumar	ADMK	4,867	16.43	19,118	64.52
