= AINRC-led Alliance =

Indian political alliance

- அஇநராகா தலைமையிலான கூட்டணி AINRC-led Alliance
- Abbreviation: AINRC+
- Chairman: N. Rangaswamy
- Founder: N. Rangaswamy
- Founded: 26 March 2011
- Colours: Green Saffron
- Alliance: National Democratic Alliance (National)
- Seats in Rajya Sabha: 1 / 1
- Seats in Lok Sabha: 0 / 1
- Seats in Puducherry Legislative Assembly: 18 / 33
- Number of states and union territories in government: 1 / 31

The AINRC-led Alliance (abbr. AINRC+) is an Indian regional political party alliance in the union territory of Puducherry led by the All India N. R. Congress (AINRC).

== Electoral performance ==
=== State legislative assembly elections ===
Puducherry Legislative Assembly Elections
Year	Assembly	Alliance parties	Seats contested	Seats won	Change in seats	Percentage of votes	Vote swing	Popular vote	Outcome
2011	13th	AINRC, AIADMK, CPI, CPI(M), and DMDK	30	20 / 30	New	48.41%	New	337,859	Government
2016	14th	AINRC	30	8 / 30	▼12	28.1%	▼20.31%	2,25,082	Opposition
2021	15th	AINRC, BJP, and AIADMK	30	16 / 30	▲8	43.65%	▲15.55%	365,170	Government
2026	16th	AINRC, BJP, LJK and AIADMK	30	18 / 30	▲2	38.70%	▼4.95%	335,177	Government

== List of members ==
No.	Political party	Flag	Election symbol	Leader	Seats			ECI Status
No.	Political party	Flag	Election symbol	Leader	Lok Sabha in Puducherry	Rajya Sabha in Puducherry	Puducherry Legislative Assembly	ECI Status
1	All India N. R. Congress (AINRC)			N. Rangasamy	0 / 1	0 / 1	10 / 30	State Party
2	Bharatiya Janata Party (BJP)			V. P. Ramalingame	0 / 1	1 / 1	6 / 30	National Party
3	Latchiya Jananayaka Katchi (LJK)			Jose Charles Martin	0 / 1	0 / 1	1 / 30	Unrecognised Party
4	All India Anna Dravida Munnetra Kazhagam (AIADMK)			A. Anbalagan	0 / 1	0 / 1	1 / 30	State Party
TOTAL					0 / 1	1 / 1	18 / 30	Steady

== Withdrawals ==
Political party	State	Date	Reason for withdrawal
Communist Party of India	Tamil Nadu	2015	Allied with MNK
Communist Party of India (Marxist)	Tamil Nadu	2015	Allied with MNK
Desiya Murpokku Dravida Kazhagam	Tamil Nadu	2015	Allied with MNK

== See also ==
- Secular Social Justice Victory Alliance
- DMK-led alliance
- NDA Alliance
- INDIA Alliance
