= T. P. R. Selvame =

Indian politician

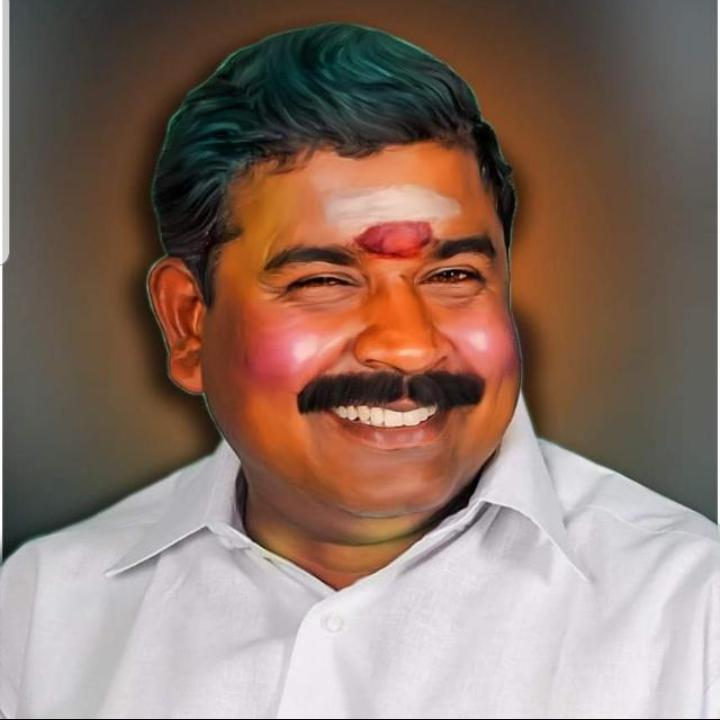
- T. P. R. Selvam

Member of the Puducherry Legislative Assembly
- In office 2011–2021
- Preceded by: P. Arulmurugan
- Succeeded by: A. Namassivayam
- Constituency: Mannadipet

Deputy Speaker of the Puducherry Legislative Assembly
- In office 2011
- Preceded by: A.Kumar@Krishnan

Personal details
- Born: R. Selvam; 14 May 1971 (age 55) Pondicherry
- Party: Indian National Congress
- Other political affiliations: All Indian N.R. Congress
- Profession: Politician

T. P. R. Selvame is an Indian politician belonging to the Indian National Congress. He was elected from the Mannadipet constituency in Puducherry Legislative Assembly election in 2016 as well as in Puducherry Legislative Assembly election in 2011.
