= C. Djeacoumar =

Indian politician

Member of Puducherry Legislative Assembly
- Incumbent
- Assumed office 2 May 2021
- Preceded by: S. V. Sugumaran
- Constituency: Mangalam (constituency)

Cabinet Ministers of Agriculture. Animal Husbandry & Animal Welfare. Forest & Wildlife. Social Welfare. Backward Class Welfare. Women & Child Development
- Incumbent
- Assumed office 27 May 2021

Personal details
- Party: All India NR Congress

C. Djeacoumar is an Indian politician from All India NR Congress. In May 2021, he was elected as a member of the Puducherry Legislative Assembly from Mangalam (constituency). He defeated Sun. Kumaravel of Dravida Munnetra Kazhagam by 14,221 votes in 2021 Puducherry Assembly election.

He serves as a minister in the AINRC-BJP coalition government led by NR Rangaswamy (AINRC) since 2021.
