= P. M. L. Kalyanasundaram =

Indian politician

P.M.L. Kalyanasundaram

Member of Puducherry Legislative Assembly
- Incumbent
- Assumed office 2 May 2021
- Preceded by: M. O. H. F. Shahjahan
- Constituency: Kalapet

Transport Minister of Union Territory of Puducherry
- In office 2011–?

Personal details
- Born: 16 July 1977 (age 49) Puducherry
- Party: Bharatiya Janata Party
- Other political affiliations: All India N.R. Congress
- Spouse: Priyadharshini
- Children: 2 sons and 1 daughter
- Profession: POLITICIAN
- Website: www.pmlk.in

Periannane Muthu Lakshmi Kalyanasundaram known as P. M. L. Kalyanasundaram (born 4 May 1957) is an Indian politician who is serving as the current member of Puducherry Legislative Assembly from Kalapet Constituency and is a member of the Bharatiya Janata Party. since 2 May 2021. He previously served as the Transport Minister of U.T. of Puducherry in 2011.

== Electoral History ==
Year	Constituency	Party	Votes	%	Opponent	Party	Votes	%	Result	Margin	%
2026	Kalapet	BJP	11,622	36.84	A. Senthil Ramesh	DMK	12,069	38.26	Lost	▼447	▼1.42
2021	Kalapet	BJP	13,277	44.63	A. Senthil Ramesh	IND	9,769	32.84	Won	▲3,508	▲11.79
2016	Kalapet	IND	9,205	32.83	M.O.H.F. Shahjahan	INC	9,839	35.09	Lost	▼634	▼2.26
2011	Kalapet	AINRC	14,132	62.43	M.O.H.F. Shahjahan	INC	7,766	34.31	Won	▲6,366	▲28.12
2006	Lawspet	BJP	10,365	24.88	M.O.H.F. Shahjahan	INC	17,944	43.06	Lost	▼7,579	▼18.18
