= Gollapalli Srinivas Ashok =

Indian politician

Member of Puducherry Legislative Assembly
- Incumbent
- Assumed office 2 May 2021
- Preceded by: Malladi Krishna Rao
- Constituency: Yanam

Personal details
- Born: 10 May 1993 (age 32) Yanam, Puducherry
- Party: INDEPENDENT
- Education: PG Diploma in Business Administration
- Profession: Social worker

Gollapalli Srinivas Ashok is an Indian politician of the Union Territory of Puducherry. He was elected to state legislative assembly from Yanam constituency as independent candidate during 2021 Puducherry Legislative Assembly election.

After winning the assembly elections as independent candidate, he pledged his support to the Bharatiya Janata Party in the Puducherry Legislative Assembly.

== Family and educational background ==
Ashok is a son of Late Gollapalli Gangadhara Prathap, a BJP politician in Yanam during the late 1990s and early 2000s. His father contested unsuccessfully from Yanam in 2000 (By-election) and 2001 Puducherry Legislative Assembly election. Ashok pursued PG Diploma in Business Administration.

== Elections contested and results ==
Year	Constituency	Result	vote	opponent	vote	margin
2021	Yanam	Won	17131	N. Rangasamy	16475	655

Thiru.N.Rangasamy has served as Puducherry Chief Minister three times. Gollapalli Srinivas Ashok won the election against Chief Minister. It is a record in Union Territory of Puducherry.

== Titles held ==
Preceded by Malladi Krishna Rao	MLA of Yanam; 2021–2026	Succeeded by Incumbent

== See also ==
- Yanam (Union Territory Assembly constituency)
- 2021 Puducherry Legislative Assembly election
