= Mudaliarpet Assembly constituency =

Constituency of the Puducherry legislative assembly in India

Coordinates: 11.920°N 79.807°E

Mudaliarpet
- Constituency No. 18 for the Puducherry Legislative Assembly
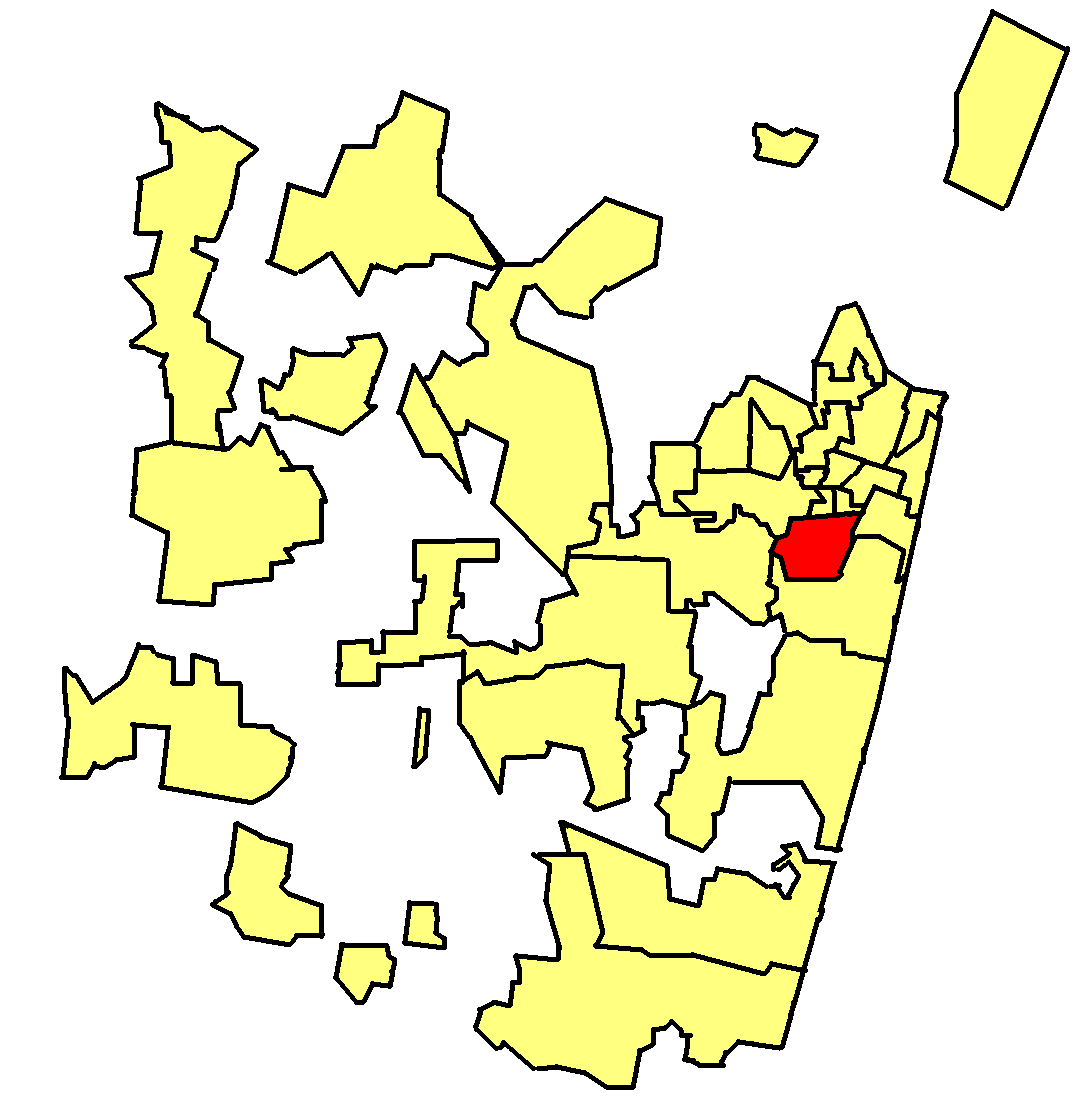

Constituency details
- Country: India
- Region: South India
- Union Territory: Puducherry
- District: Puducherry
- Lok Sabha constituency: Puducherry
- Established: 1964
- Total electors: 35,597
- Reservation: None

Member of Legislative Assembly
- 16th Puducherry Legislative Assembly
- Incumbent A. Johnkumar
- Party: BJP
- Alliance: NDA
- Elected year: 2026

Mudaliarpet Assembly constituency is a legislative assembly constituency in the Union territory of Puducherry in India. Mudaliarpet Assembly constituency is part of Puducherry Lok Sabha constituency.

== Members of the Legislative Assembly ==
Year	Member	Party
2006	M. A. S. Subramanian	Dravida Munnetra Kazhagam
2011	A. Baskar	All India Anna Dravida Munnetra Kazhagam
2016	A. Baskar	All India Anna Dravida Munnetra Kazhagam
2021	L. Sambath	Dravida Munnetra Kazhagam
2026	A. Johnkumar	Bharatiya Janata Party

== Election results ==
Vote share of winning candidates
2026	41.49%
2021	51.30%
2016	49.75%
2011	67.15%
2006	37.22%
2001	40.98%
1996	49.69%
1991	45.45%
1990	45.39%
1985	47.06%
1980	48.39%
1977	41.68%
1974	43.06%
1969	62.01%
1964	51.80%

=== Assembly Election 2026 ===
2026 Puducherry Legislative Assembly election: Mudaliarpet
Party	Candidate	Votes	%	±%
BJP	A. Johnkumar	12,945	41.49	
DMK	L. Sambath	10574	33.89	
TVK	N. Mani Balan	5906	18.93	New
Independent	N. ANNATHURAI	384	1.23	New
NOTA	NOTA	308	0.99	
Margin of victory		2371		
Turnout		31199		
Rejected ballots				
Registered electors		34,358		
BJP gain from DMK		Swing		

=== Assembly Election 2021 ===
2021 Puducherry Legislative Assembly election: Mudaliarpet
Party	Candidate	Votes	%	±%
DMK	L. Sambath	15,151	51.30	+41.71
AIADMK	A. Baskar	10,972	37.15	−12.61
MNM	M. Arikrishnan	1,321	4.47	
NOTA	Nota	452	1.53	−1.54
Margin of victory		4,179	14.15	−4.57
Turnout		29,536	83.01	−3.39
Registered electors		35,583		6.80
DMK gain from AIADMK		Swing	1.54	

=== Assembly Election 2016 ===
2016 Puducherry Legislative Assembly election: Mudaliarpet
Party	Candidate	Votes	%	±%
AIADMK	A. Baskar	14,321	49.75	−17.40
AINRC	V. Balan	8,934	31.04	
DMK	Suresh	2,759	9.59	−19.18
NOTA	None of the Above	883	3.07	
BJP	V. Selvam	593	2.06	−0.21
PMK	Gopalakrishnan	443	1.54	
CPI	V. S. Abishegam	385	1.34	
Margin of victory		5,387	18.72	−19.67
Turnout		28,784	86.39	−0.14
Registered electors		33,317		13.77
AIADMK hold		Swing	-17.40	

=== Assembly Election 2011 ===
2011 Puducherry Legislative Assembly election: Mudaliarpet
Party	Candidate	Votes	%	±%
AIADMK	A. Baskar	17,016	67.15	
DMK	Dr. M. A. S. Subramanian	7,289	28.76	−8.46
BJP	G. Padmanaban	575	2.27	1.32
IJK	E. Jegan @ Jeganadhane	231	0.91	
Independent	M. Subramani	123	0.49	
Margin of victory		9,727	38.39	33.54
Turnout		25,340	86.53	−1.32
Registered electors		29,284		−11.19
AIADMK gain from DMK		Swing	29.93	

=== Assembly Election 2006 ===
2006 Pondicherry Legislative Assembly election: Mudaliarpet
Party	Candidate	Votes	%	±%
DMK	MAS Subramanian	10,783	37.22	−3.75
PMC	P. Kannan	9,379	32.38	
Independent	V. Sababady Kothandraman	7,949	27.44	
DMDK	J. Murugan	556	1.92	
BJP	J. Ramdass	275	0.95	
Margin of victory		1,404	4.85	−1.91
Turnout		28,968	87.85	14.62
Registered electors		32,973		8.45
DMK hold		Swing	-3.75	

=== Assembly Election 2001 ===
2001 Pondicherry Legislative Assembly election: Mudaliarpet
Party	Candidate	Votes	%	±%
DMK	Dr. M. A. S. Subramanian	9,119	40.98	
INC	V. Sababady Kothandraman	7,616	34.22	−1.92
Independent	G. Logalatchagan	2,647	11.89	
AIADMK	A. Ravindran	2,369	10.65	
MDMK	S. Muthu	334	1.50	
RJD	T. Sanjeevi	169	0.76	
Margin of victory		1,503	6.75	−6.79
Turnout		22,254	73.23	5.56
Registered electors		30,403		−7.70
DMK gain from CPI		Swing	-4.47	

=== Assembly Election 1996 ===
1996 Pondicherry Legislative Assembly election: Mudaliarpet
Party	Candidate	Votes	%	±%
CPI	M. Manjini	11,380	49.69	25.97
INC	V. Sababady Kothandraman	8,278	36.15	16.28
PMK	G. Thiruvarasan	2,506	10.94	3.59
Independent	S. Sivaraman	263	1.15	
BJP	P. Jayakumar	153	0.67	−0.07
CPI(ML)L	K. Subramanian @ K. S. Mani	123	0.54	
Margin of victory		3,102	13.54	−8.18
Turnout		22,902	71.54	3.88
Registered electors		32,940		18.11
CPI gain from Independent		Swing	4.24	

=== Assembly Election 1991 ===
1991 Pondicherry Legislative Assembly election: Mudaliarpet
Party	Candidate	Votes	%	±%
Independent	V. Sababady Kothandraman	8,230	45.45	
CPI	M. Manjini	4,295	23.72	−21.67
INC	V. Bhalan	3,597	19.86	−21.16
PMK	G. Thiruvarasan	1,331	7.35	−6.07
JP	A. Ammanathan	411	2.27	
BJP	V. Selvam	133	0.73	
Independent	G. Balaraman	101	0.56	
Margin of victory		3,935	21.73	17.37
Turnout		18,109	67.66	−4.02
Registered electors		27,889		1.17
Independent gain from CPI		Swing	0.06	

=== Assembly Election 1990 ===
1990 Pondicherry Legislative Assembly election: Mudaliarpet
Party	Candidate	Votes	%	±%
CPI	M. Manjini	8,905	45.39	1.23
INC	V. Sababady Kothandraman	8,049	41.02	−6.04
PMK	G. Thiruvarasan	2,633	13.42	
Margin of victory		856	4.36	1.46
Turnout		19,620	71.69	−5.71
Registered electors		27,566		59.35
CPI gain from INC		Swing	-1.67	

=== Assembly Election 1985 ===
1985 Pondicherry Legislative Assembly election: Mudaliarpet
Party	Candidate	Votes	%	±%
INC	V. Sababady Kothandraman	6,260	47.06	
CPI	M. Manjini	5,874	44.16	17.01
JP	E. Ganesan	1,138	8.56	
Margin of victory		386	2.90	−18.34
Turnout		13,302	77.39	−4.90
Registered electors		17,299		26.34
INC gain from INC(I)		Swing	-1.32	

=== Assembly Election 1980 ===
1980 Pondicherry Legislative Assembly election: Mudaliarpet
Party	Candidate	Votes	%	±%
INC(I)	V. Sababady Kothandraman	5,258	48.39	
CPI	M. Manjini	2,950	27.15	
CPI(M)	D. B. Govindan	2,306	21.22	
Independent	Alagiri	353	3.25	
Margin of victory		2,308	21.24	3.24
Turnout		10,867	82.30	6.54
Registered electors		13,692		8.60
INC(I) gain from INC		Swing	6.71	

=== Assembly Election 1977 ===
1977 Pondicherry Legislative Assembly election: Mudaliarpet
Party	Candidate	Votes	%	±%
INC	V. Sababady Kothandraman	3,947	41.68	
AIADMK	A. Radharishanan	2,243	23.69	
JP	Jeyaselan Padmanabhan	1,893	19.99	
DMK	S. Muthu	1,387	14.65	−1.66
Margin of victory		1,704	17.99	11.78
Turnout		9,470	75.75	−11.37
Registered electors		12,608		16.74
INC gain from INC(O)		Swing	-1.38	

=== Assembly Election 1974 ===
1974 Pondicherry Legislative Assembly election: Mudaliarpet
Party	Candidate	Votes	%	±%
INC(O)	V. Sababady Kothandraman	3,889	43.06	
CPI	R. Alwar	3,328	36.85	−25.16
DMK	S. Vedanayagam	1,473	16.31	
CPI(M)	M. Govidasamy	341	3.78	
Margin of victory		561	6.21	−17.81
Turnout		9,031	87.12	2.02
Registered electors		10,800		18.66
INC(O) gain from CPI		Swing	-18.95	

=== Assembly Election 1969 ===
1969 Pondicherry Legislative Assembly election: Mudaliarpet
Party	Candidate	Votes	%	±%
CPI	Y. Kailasa Surbian	4,748	62.01	
INC	A. S. Janakipaman	2,909	37.99	−10.21
Margin of victory		1,839	24.02	20.42
Turnout		7,657	85.10	2.33
Registered electors		9,102		−1.27
CPI gain from IPF		Swing	10.21	

=== Assembly Election 1964 ===
1964 Pondicherry Legislative Assembly election: Mudaliarpet
Party	Candidate	Votes	%	±%
IPF	V. Subbiah	3,878	51.80	
INC	K. Srinivasan	3,609	48.20	
Margin of victory		269	3.59	
Turnout		7,487	82.77	
Registered electors		9,219		
IPF win (new seat)				

== See also ==
- List of constituencies of the Puducherry Legislative Assembly
- Puducherry district
