= M. O. H. F. Shahjahan =

Indian politician

Member of Puducherry Legislative Assembly
- In office ‌‍ 19 May 2016 – 2 May 2021
- Constituency: Kalapet
- In office 13 May 2001 – 13 May 2011
- Constituency: Lawspet

Personal details
- Party: Indian National Congress
- Profession: Politician

M. O. Hasan Farook Shahjahan is an Indian politician. He is a member of the Indian National Congress in the Union Territory of Puducherry. He won the 2016 Puducherry Legislative Assembly election from Kalapet constituency by a narrow margin of 500 votes over All India N.R Congress' candidate P.M.L. Kalyanasundram who had earlier defeated him in the 2011 Puducherry Legislative Assembly election in the same constituency. He has been a Revenue, transport, IT, minority affairs minister in the Government of Puducherry. He represented Lawspet constituency between 2001 and 2011 and Kalapet constituency from 2016 to 2021. He is also the son of M. O. H. Farook who was former Chief Minister of Pondicherry.

He contested the Kamaraj Nagar Constituency in 2021 and lost to Johnkumar of BJP.

== Electoral History ==
Year	Constituency	Party	Votes	%	Opponent	Party	Votes	%	Result	Margin	%
2026	Kalapet	INC	1,990	6.31	Senthil @ Ramesh	DMK	12,069	38.26	Lost	▼10,079	▼31.95
2021	Kamaraj Nagar	INC	9,458	31.80	A. Johnkumar	BJP	16,687	56.11	Lost	▼7,229	▼24.31
2016	Kalapet	INC	9,839	35.09	P.M.L. Kalyanasundaram	IND	9,205	32.83	Won	▲634	▲2.26
2011	Kalapet	INC	7,766	34.31	P.M.L. Kalyana Sundaram	AINRC	14,132	62.43	Lost	▼6,366	▼28.12
2006	Lawspet	INC	17,944	43.06	G. Anandhamurugesan	AIADMK	10,986	26.37	Won	▲6,958	▲16.69
2001	Lawspet	INC	12,929	38.51	N. Kesavan	DMK	10,962	32.65	Won	▲1,967	▲5.86
1996	Lawspet	INC	10,211	33.78	N. Kesavan	DMK	16,442	54.40	Lost	▼6,231	▼20.62
