= A. K. D. Arumugam =

Indian politician

A.K.D. Arumugam

Member of Puducherry Legislative Assembly
- Incumbent
- Assumed office 2011
- Preceded by: Post Established
- Constituency: Indira Nagar (constituency)

Personal details
- Party: All India NR Congress
- Other political affiliations: Indian National Congress
- Education: 10th Pass
- Profession: Agriculture and Property Dealer

A.K.D. Arumugam is an Indian politician from All India NR Congress. In 2011, he was elected as a member of the Puducherry Legislative Assembly from Indira Nagar (constituency). He defeated M. Kannan of Indian National Congress by 18,531 votes in 2021 Puducherry Assembly election.
