= Mangalam Assembly constituency =

Constituency of the Puducherry legislative assembly in India

Coordinates: 11.893°N 79.736°E

Mangalam
- Constituency No. 4 for the Puducherry Legislative Assembly
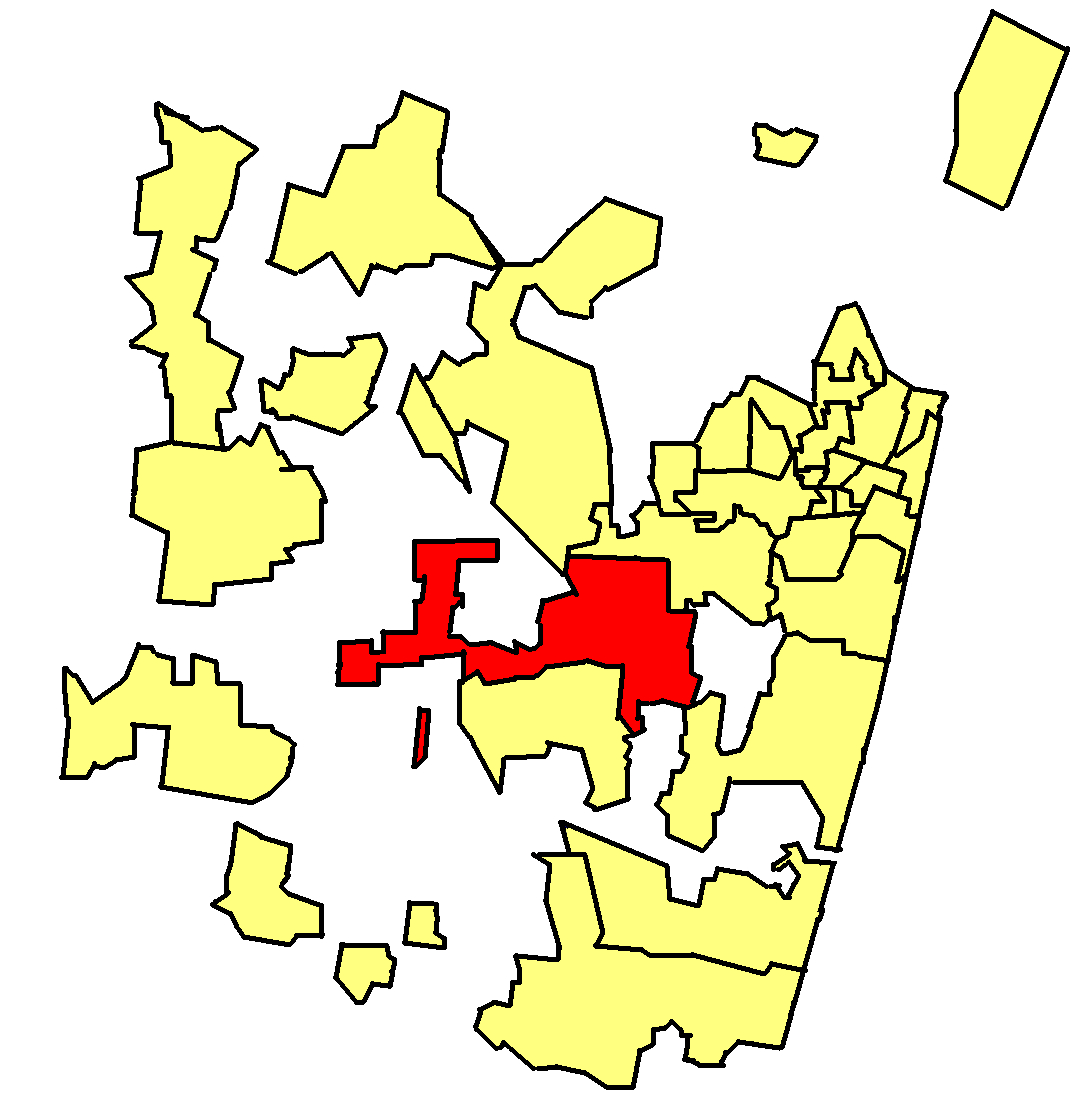

Constituency details
- Country: India
- Region: South India
- Union Territory: Puducherry
- District: Puducherry
- Lok Sabha constituency: Puducherry
- Established: 2008
- Total electors: 38,004
- Reservation: None

Member of Legislative Assembly
- 16th Puducherry Legislative Assembly
- Incumbent N. Rangaswamy; Chief Minister of Puducherry
- Party: AINRC
- Alliance: NDA
- Elected year: 2026

Mangalam is a legislative assembly constituency in the Union territory of Puducherry in India. It is a part of Puducherry Lok Sabha constituency and comprises parts of Villianur Commune Panchayat and Kurumbapet Gram Panchayat, both in Puducherry district.

== Members of Legislative Assembly ==
Year	Name	Political party
2011	C. Djeacoumar	Indian National Congress
2016	S. V. Sugumaran	All India N.R. Congress
2021	C. Djeacoumar	All India N.R. Congress
2026	N. Rangaswamy	All India N.R. Congress

== Election results ==
Vote share of Winning candidates
2026	50.61%
2021	50.89%
2016	44.61%
2011	52.59%

=== 2026 ===
2026 Puducherry Legislative Assembly election: Mangalam
Party	Candidate	Votes	%	±%
AINRC	N. Rangasamy	17,917	50.61	▼0.28
DMK	S. S. Rangan	10,867	30.69	▼11.95
TVK	M. K. Sathia Manikkavasagane	4,202	11.87	
INC	K. Ragubady	1,414	3.99	
NOTA	None of the above	190	0.54	▼0.56
IND	I. Thavamani	123	0.35	
IND	E. Balaraman	100	0.28	
TMTHK	G. Sathiyamoorthy	83	0.23	
PMK	G. Mathiyalagan	62	0.18	
Majority		7,050	19.92	▲11.67
Turnout		35,405	95.35	▲7.60
AINRC hold		Swing		

=== 2021 ===
2021 Puducherry Legislative Assembly election: Mangalam
Party	Candidate	Votes	%	±%
AINRC	C. Djeacoumar	16,972	50.89	▲6.28
DMK	Sun. Kumaravel	14,221	42.64	▲15.81
NOTA	None of the above	367	1.10	▼0.07
MNM	M. Subramani	279	0.84	
IND	P. Cannane	206	0.62	
Amma Makkal Munnettra Kazagam	M. Ganapathy	195	0.58	
BSP	A. Pathimaraj	104	0.31	▼0.02
DMDK	S. Patchaiappan	85	0.25	
IND	A. Egambaram	37	0.11	
IND	M. Karthick	32	0.10	
IJK	Manavalan	17	0.05	▼0.01
Majority		2,751	8.25	▼9.53
Turnout		33,353	87.75	▼2.06
AINRC hold		Swing		

=== 2016 ===
2016 Puducherry Legislative Assembly election: Mangalam
Party	Candidate	Votes	%	±%
AINRC	S. V. Sugumaran	13,955	44.61	▲0.60
DMK	S. Kumaravel	8,392	26.83	
AIADMK	K. Natarajan	7,124	22.77	
NOTA	None of the above	366	1.17	
MDMK	N. Elumalai	314	1.00	
BJP	M. Latchoumy	272	0.87	▲0.23
IND	R. Balamurugan	181	0.58	
IND	Sugumaran	178	0.57	
IND	P. Murugesan	105	0.34	
BSP	D. Alangaravelu	103	0.33	
CPI(ML)L	P. Murugan	95	0.30	
IND	J. Haridass	42	0.13	
AGIMK	Dr. K. A. Magadevan	33	0.11	
IJK	N. Kasinathan	19	0.06	▼0.10
Majority		5,563	17.78	▲9.20
Turnout		31,283	89.81	▼2.30
AINRC gain from INC		Swing		

=== 2011 ===
2011 Puducherry Legislative Assembly election: Mangalam
Party	Candidate	Votes	%	±%
INC	C. Djeacoumar	14,052	52.59	
AINRC	P. Anandabaskaran	11,759	44.01	
IND	Aboobakkar	305	1.14	
IND	Parandamane	177	0.66	
BJP	P. Cannane	171	0.64	
IND	T. Sivasubramanian	105	0.39	
LJP	P. Pavadaisamy	87	0.33	
IJK	P. Murugesan	43	0.16	
JD(U)	S. Manavaladass	19	0.07	
Majority		2,293	8.58	
Turnout		26,718	92.11	
INC win (new seat)				

== See also ==
- List of constituencies of the Puducherry Legislative Assembly
- Puducherry district
