= Kalapet Assembly constituency =

Constituency of the Puducherry legislative assembly in India

Coordinates: 12.033°N 79.865°E

Kalapet
- Constituency No. 12 for the Puducherry Legislative Assembly
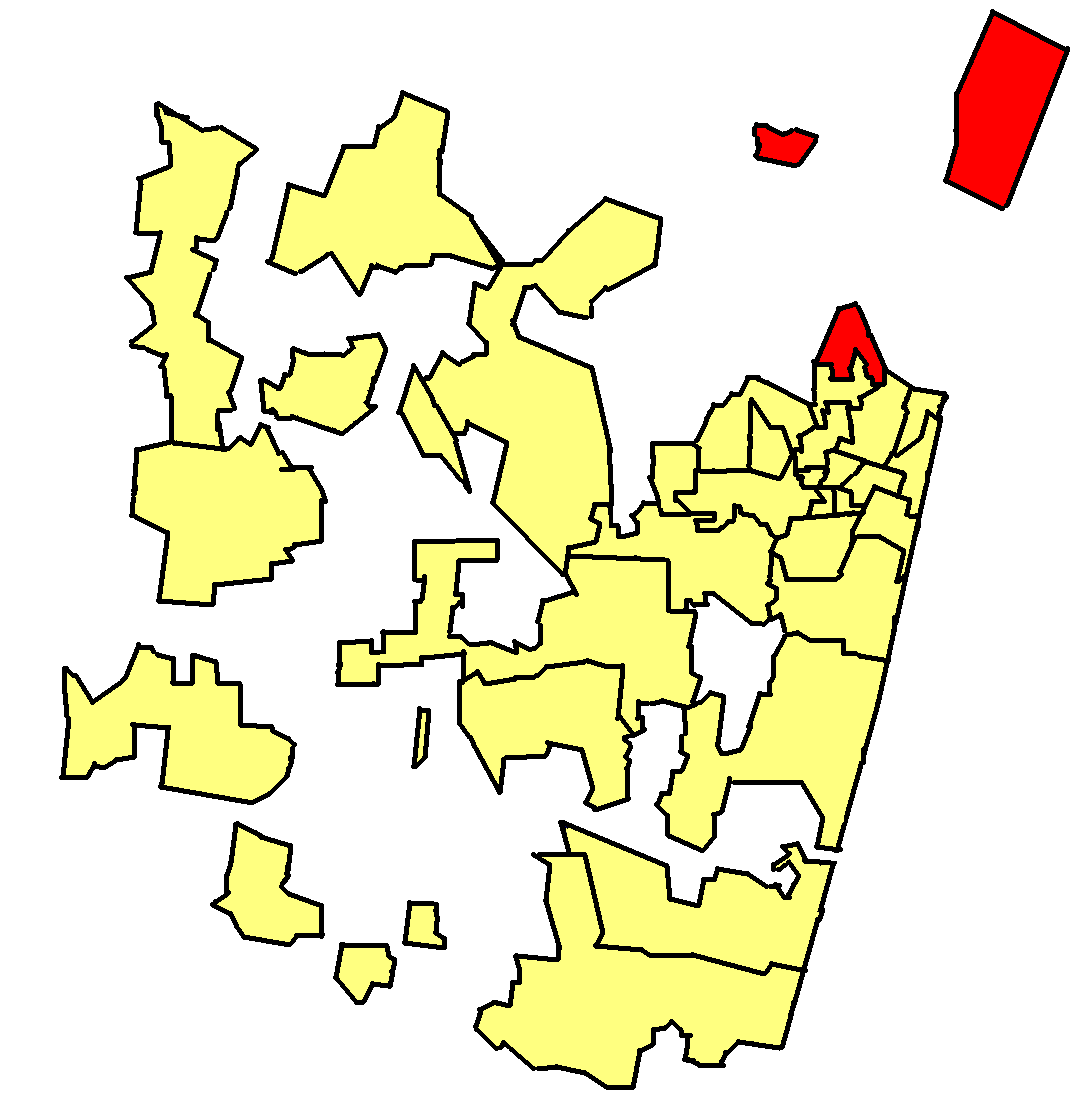

Constituency details
- Country: India
- Region: South India
- Union Territory: Puducherry
- District: Puducherry
- Lok Sabha constituency: Puducherry
- Established: 2008
- Total electors: 34,547
- Reservation: None

Member of Legislative Assembly
- 16th Puducherry Legislative Assembly
- Incumbent P.M.L. Kalyanasundaram
- Party: Bharatiya Janata Party
- Elected year: 2021

Kalapet is a legislative assembly constituency in the Union territory of Puducherry in India. Kalapet Assembly constituency covers the enclave of Kalapet and is a part of the Puducherry Lok Sabha constituency.

== Members of the Legislative Assembly ==
Year	Name	Party
2011	P. M. L. Kalyanasundaram	All India N.R. Congress
2016	M. O. H. F. Shahjahan	Indian National Congress
2021	P. M. L. Kalyanasundaram	Bharatiya Janata Party
2026	Senthil Ramesh	Dravida Munnetra Kazhagam

== Election results ==
Vote share of Winning candidates
2026	38.26%
2021	44.63%
2016	35.09%
2011	62.43%

=== 2026 ===
2026 Puducherry Legislative Assembly election: Kalapet
Party	Candidate	Votes	%	±%
DMK	Senthil Ramesh	12,069	38.26	▲25.59
BJP	P. M. L. Kalyanasundaram	11,622	36.84	▼7.79
TVK	D. Sasikumar	4,775	15.14	
INC	M. O. H. F. Shahjahan	1,990	6.31	
NOTA	None of the above	293	0.93	▼0.59
Majority		447	1.42	▼10.37
Turnout		31,545	92.88	▲7.01
DMK gain from BJP		Swing		

=== 2021 ===
2021 Puducherry Legislative Assembly election: Kalapet
Party	Candidate	Votes	%	±%
BJP	P. M. L. Kalyanasundaram	13,277	44.63	▲43.97
IND	Senthil Ramesh	9,769	32.84	
DMK	S. Mouttouvel	3,769	12.67	
MNM	R. Chandramohan	685	2.30	
NOTA	None of the above	453	1.52	▲0.18
DMDK	S. Hariharan	157	0.53	▼0.25
Majority		3,508	11.79	▲9.53
Turnout		29,751	85.87	▼1.74
BJP gain from INC		Swing		

=== 2016 ===
2016 Puducherry Legislative Assembly election: Kalapet
Party	Candidate	Votes	%	±%
INC	M. O. H. F. Shahjahan	9,839	35.09	▲0.78
IND	P. M. L. Kalyanasundaram	9,205	32.83	
AINRC	N. Viswanathan	3,841	13.70	▼48.73
AIADMK	V. C. Ezhumalai	3,694	13.17	
NOTA	None of the above	377	1.34	
Majority		634	2.26	▼25.86
Turnout		28,042	87.61	▼0.05
INC gain from AINRC		Swing		

=== 2011 ===
2011 Puducherry Legislative Assembly election: Kalapet
Party	Candidate	Votes	%	±%
AINRC	P. M. L. Kalyanasundaram	14,132	62.43	
INC	M. O. H. F. Shahjahan	7,766	34.31	
BJP	L. Karunakaran	214	0.95	
Majority		6,366	28.12	
Turnout		22,637	87.66	
AINRC win (new seat)				
