= Kadirkamam Assembly constituency =

Constituency of the Puducherry legislative assembly in India

Coordinates: 11.940°N 79.796°E

Khadirkaman
- Constituency No. 7 for the Puducherry Legislative Assembly
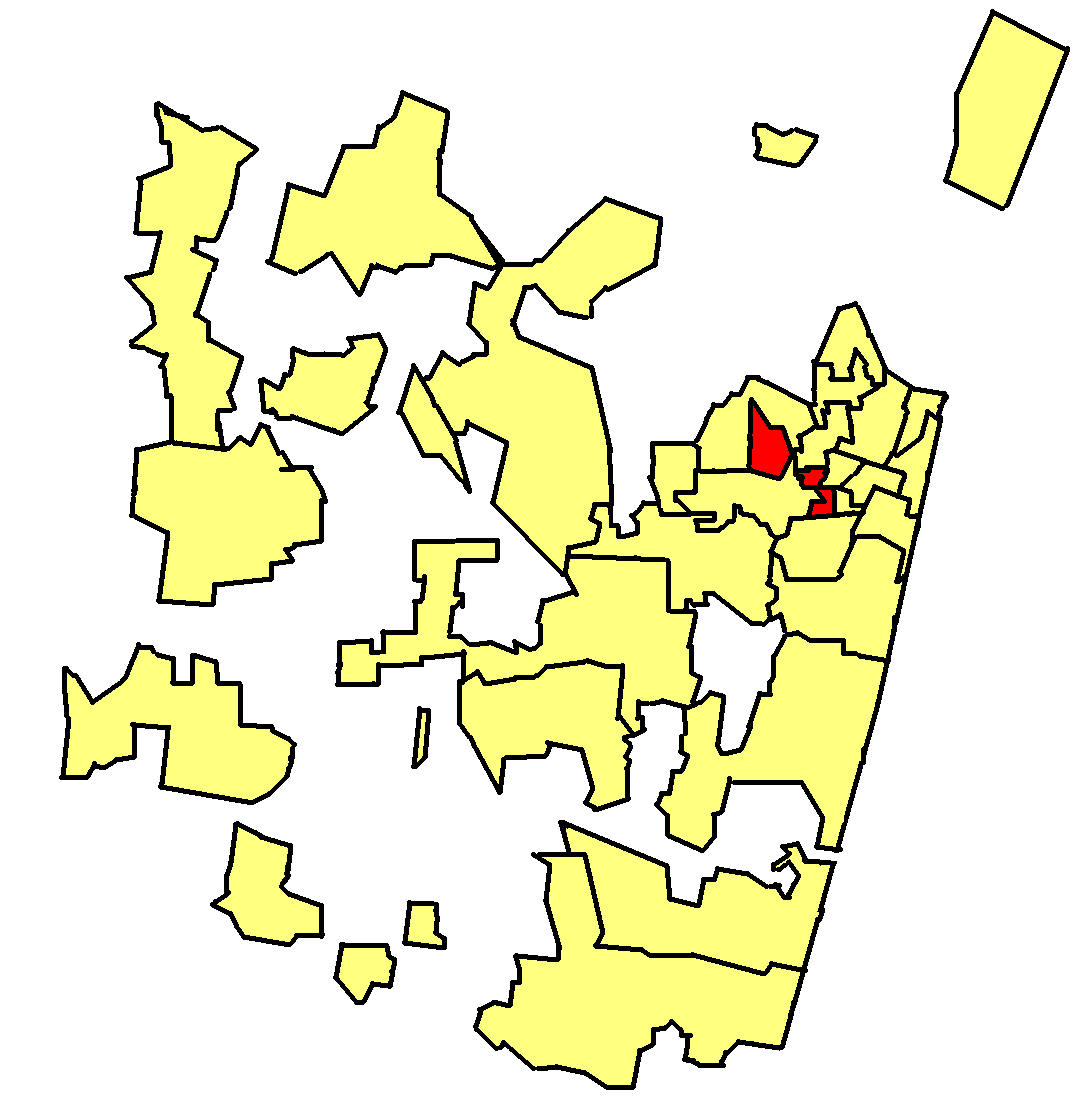

Constituency details
- Country: India
- Region: South India
- Union Territory: Puducherry
- District: Puducherry
- Lok Sabha constituency: Puducherry
- Established: 2008
- Total electors: 34,471
- Reservation: None

Member of Legislative Assembly
- 16th Puducherry Legislative Assembly
- Incumbent S. S. Azhagu @ Azhaganatham
- Party: Independent
- Alliance: Independent
- Elected year: 2026

Kadirkamam (or Kadirgamam) is a legislative assembly constituency in the Union territory of Puducherry in India. Kathirkamam Assembly constituency is part of Puducherry Lok Sabha constituency. It comprises wards 25-27, 35, and 36 of the Ozhukarai municipality. As of 2021, its representative is S. Ramesh of the All India N.R. Congress party.

== Members of Legislative Assembly ==
| Year | Member | Political party |
|---|---|---|
| 2011 | N. Rangaswamy | All India N.R. Congress |
| 2016 | N. S. Jayabal | All India N.R. Congress |
| 2021 | S. Ramesh | All India N.R. Congress |
| 2026 | S. S. Azhagu @ Azhaganantham | Independent politician |

== Election results ==
Vote share of Winning candidates
| 2026 | 51.35% |
| 2021 | 65.82% |
| 2016 | 43.28% |
| 2011 | 70.02% |

=== 2026 ===
2026 Puducherry Legislative Assembly election: Kathirkamam
| Party | Candidate | Votes | % | ±% |
|---|---|---|---|---|
| IND | S. S. Azhagu @ Azhaganantham | 14,633 | 51.35 | |
| AINRC | K. S. P. @ S. Ramesh | 7,629 | 26.77 | ▼39.05 |
| TVK | Jayanthi Rajavelu | 3,024 | 10.61 | |
| DMK | A. P. R. Vadivel | 2,417 | 8.48 | |
| NOTA | None of the above | 224 | 0.79 | ▼2.47 |
| PMK | R. Soupramaniane | 46 | 0.16 | |
| IND | R. Kannan | 45 | 0.16 | |
| IND | Ramesh | 31 | 0.11 | |
| NAMK (Note: Naadaalum Makkal Katchi) | K. Ponnusamy | 21 | 0.07 | |
| Majority | | 7,004 | 24.58 | ▼20.77 |
| Turnout | | 28,497 | 90.07 | ▲12.03 |
| Independent gain from AINRC | | Swing | | |

=== 2021 ===
2021 Puducherry Legislative Assembly election: Kathirkamam
| Party | Candidate | Votes | % | ±% |
|---|---|---|---|---|
| AINRC | K. S. P. @ S. Ramesh | 17,775 | 65.82 | ▲22.54 |
| INC | P. Selvanadane | 5,529 | 20.47 | ▲10.84 |
| NOTA | None of the above | 880 | 3.26 | ▼0.06 |
| DMDK | S. Motcharajan | 221 | 0.82 | ▲0.34 |
| Amma Makkal Munnettra Kazagam | S. Ganesan | 184 | 0.68 | |
| IJK | S. Sathiyavel | 150 | 0.56 | ▲0.42 |
| Majority | | 12,246 | 45.35 | ▲31.27 |
| Turnout | | 27,005 | 78.04 | ▼3.61 |
| AINRC hold | | Swing | | |

=== 2016 ===
2016 Puducherry Legislative Assembly election: Kathirkamam
| Party | Candidate | Votes | % | ±% |
|---|---|---|---|---|
| AINRC | N. S. J. Jayabal @ Ayyanar | 11,690 | 43.28 | ▼26.74 |
| IND | S. Ramesh | 7,888 | 29.20 | |
| INC | A. Sivashanmugam | 2,601 | 9.63 | ▼18.53 |
| IND | V. Mourougayan | 1,538 | 5.69 | |
| AIADMK | M. R. Govindan | 1,043 | 3.86 | |
| NOTA | None of the above | 897 | 3.32 | |
| BJP | R. Somasundaram | 673 | 2.49 | ▲1.40 |
| PMK | S. Radhakrishnan | 250 | 0.93 | |
| DMDK | K. Ezhumalai | 129 | 0.48 | |
| IJK | S. Murugesan | 39 | 0.14 | |
| Majority | | 3,802 | 14.08 | ▼27.78 |
| Turnout | | 27,013 | 81.65 | ▼1.71 |
| AINRC hold | | Swing | | |

=== 2011 ===
2011 Puducherry Legislative Assembly election: Kathirkamam
| Party | Candidate | Votes | % | ±% |
|---|---|---|---|---|
| AINRC | N. Rangasamy | 16,323 | 70.02 | |
| INC | V. Pethaperumal | 6,566 | 28.16 | |
| BJP | B. Jayanthimala | 254 | 1.09 | |
| IND | B. A. Mourougayen | 170 | 0.73 | |
| Majority | | 9,757 | 41.86 | |
| Turnout | | 23,313 | 83.36 | |
| AINRC win (new seat) | | | | |

== See also ==
- List of constituencies of the Puducherry Legislative Assembly
- Puducherry district
