= U. Lakshmikandhan =

Indian politician

Member of Puducherry Legislative Assembly
- Incumbent
- Assumed office 2 May 2021
- Preceded by: M. Candassamy
- Constituency: Embalam (constituency)

Personal details
- Party: All India NR Congress
- Education: M. A.
- Alma mater: Annamalai University
- Profession: Retired Government Employee

U. Lakshmikandhan, a politician from All India NR Congress. He was elected to the Puducherry Legislative Assembly from the Embalam (constituency). In the 2021 Puducherry Assembly election, he defeated M. Candassamy of the Indian National Congress by 2,240 votes.
