= N. Rangaswamy =

9th Chief Minister of Puducherry since 2021

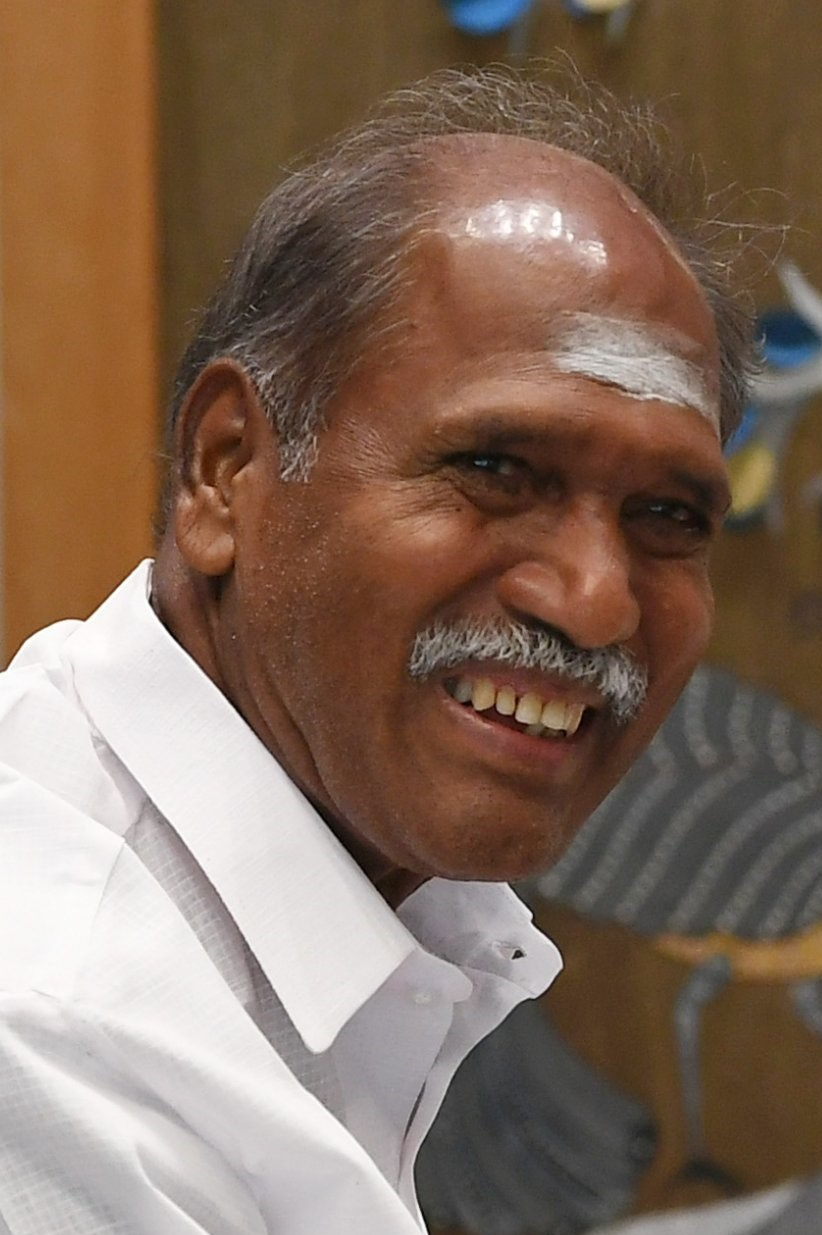
- Rangaswamy in 2022

9th Chief Minister of Puducherry
- Incumbent
- Assumed office 7 May 2021
- Lieutenant Governor: Tamilisai Soundararajan (2021–2024); C. P. Radhakrishnan (2024); Kuniyil Kailashnathan (2024–)
- Cabinet: Rangaswamy IV (2021-2026); Rangaswamy V (2026-)
- Preceded by: President's rule
- Constituency: Thattanchavady (2021-2026); Mangalam (2026-)
- In office 16 May 2011 – 6 June 2016
- Lieutenant Governor: Iqbal Singh (2011–2013); Virendra Kataria (2013–2014); A. K. Singh (2014–2016)
- Cabinet: Rangaswamy III (2011-2016)
- Preceded by: V. Vaithilingam
- Succeeded by: V. Narayanasamy
- Constituency: Kadirgamam
- In office 27 October 2001 – 4 September 2008
- Lieutenant Governor: Mukut Mithi (2006–2008); Bhopinder Singh (2008); Govind Singh Gurjar; Rajani Rai; K. R. Malkani (2002–2003); P. S. Ramamohan Rao (2003–2004); Nagendra Nath Jha (2004); Madan Mohan Lakhera (2004–2006); Mukut Mithi (2006)
- Cabinet: Rangaswamy I (2001-2006); Rangaswamy II (2006-2008)
- Preceded by: P. Shanmugam
- Succeeded by: V. Vaithilingam
- Constituency: Thattanchavady
Other Positions
12th Leader of the Opposition in Puducherry Legislative Assembly
In office 22 August 2016 – 22 February 2021
Chief Minister	V. Narayanasamy
Preceded by	V. Vaithilingam
Succeeded by	R. Siva
Constituency	Indira Nagar
Minister for Agriculture and Co-operation in the Government of Puducherry
In office 4 June 1991 – 13 May 1996
Chief Minister	V. Vaithilingam
Minister for Tourism, Education, Public Works, Civil Aviation and Art & Culture in the Government of Puducherry
In office 26 May 1996 – 18 March 2000
Chief Minister	R. V. Janakiraman
Minister for Public Works, Agriculture and Forests in the Government of Puducherry
In office 22 March 2000 – 26 October 2001
Chief Minister	P. Shanmugam

President of All India N.R. Congress
- Incumbent
- Assumed office 7 February 2011
- General Secretary: B. Bhalan (2011–2020); N. S. Jayabal (2025–)
- Preceded by: Office established

Personal details
- Born: Natesan Rangaswamy; 4 August 1950 (age 76) Pondicherry, French India
- Party: All India N. R. Congress (since 2011)
- Other political affiliations: Indian National Congress (1990–2011)

Natesan Rangaswamy (born 4 August 1950) is an Indian politician who is serving as the Chief Minister of Puducherry since May 2021. He has previously served as the chief minister from 2001 to 2008 and from 2011 to 2016. He is the founding president of the political party All India N. R. Congress (AINRC), which was formed after a breakaway from the Indian National Congress in 2011.

Born in 1950, Rangaswamy completed his Bachelor of Commerce from Tagore Arts College and Bachelor of Laws from Dr. Ambedkar Government Law College in Puducherry in 1977. He contested his first election as the Congress candidate from Thattanchavady Assembly constituency during the 1990 Pondicherry Legislative Assembly election. He was elected as a member of the Pondicherry Legislative Assembly for four consecutive times from the same constituency, having first won in 1991. He served as a cabinet minister from 1991 to 2001, under three different chief ministers. He became the chief minister of Pondicherry for the first time in October 2001, and was re-appointed to the position after the Congress won the 2006 assembly elections.

Rangaswamy stepped down as the chief minister in August 2008 after internal issues within the party. Citing reconcilable differences, he formed his own party, AINRC, and contested in the 2011 assembly elections. He was elected as a member from the Kadirkamam constituency and was sworn in the chief minister for the third time in May 2016. He served as the leader of the opposition in the assembly from August 2016 to February 2021. His party won the 2021 assembly elections as a part of the National Democratic Alliance and he was sworn in as the chief minister for the fourth time on 7 May 2021. The alliance won a majority in the subsequent 2026 assembly elections, and Rangaswamy was sworn in as the chief minister for the fifth time on 13 May 2026.

== Early life ==
Natesan Rangaswamy was born on 4 August 1950 in Puducherry to parents Natesan Krishnasamy and Panchali. He got his Bachelor of Commerce degree from Tagore Arts College and Bachelor of Laws from Dr. Ambedkar Government Law College, Puducherry in 1977.

== Political career ==
Rangaswamy contested his first election as the Indian National Congress candidate from Thattanchavady Assembly constituency during the 1990 Pondicherry Legislative Assembly election. However, he lost the elections to V. Pethaperumal of the Janata Dal (JD) by 982 votes. However, the fall of the JD-led government led to the elections to the Pondicherry Legislative Assembly in 1991. Rangaswamy contested from the same constituency, and was elected as a member of the legislative assembly, after defeating Pethaperumal by 7,260 votes. He was appointed as the minister of agriculture and co-operation in the cabinet led by V. Vaithilingam. After he won the 1996 assembly elections, he was appointed as the minister for tourism, education, public works, civil aviation and art & culture in the R. V. Janakiraman cabinet. He won the 2001 assembly elections from Thattanchavady, defeating Pethaperumal for the third time. He served as the minister for public works, agriculture and forests in the Pondicherry government under the chief ministership of P. Shanmugam from March 2000 to October 2001.

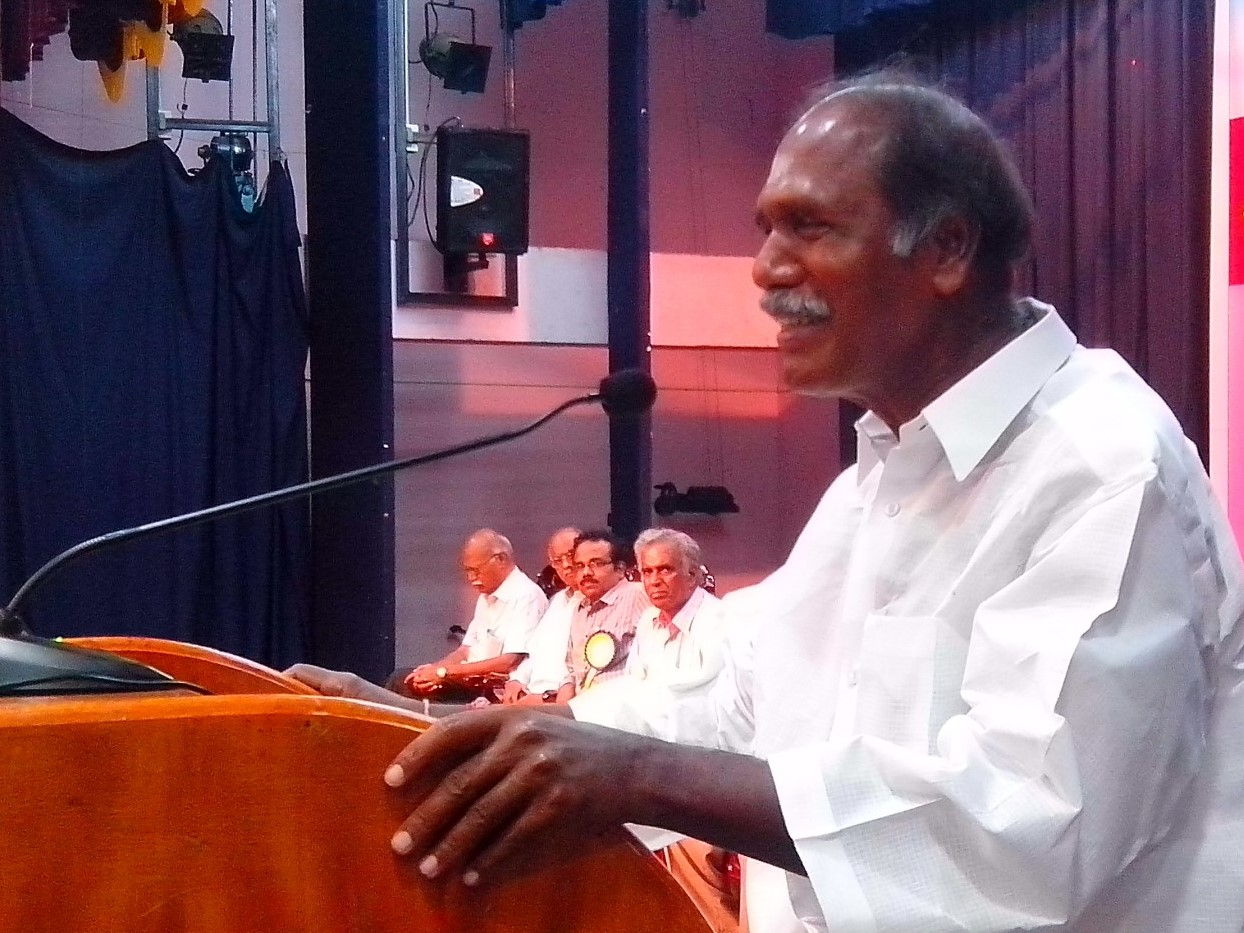
Rangaswamy in 2014

Rangaswamy was appointed as the chief minister of Puducherry on 27 October 2001. After he led the Congress to victory in the 2006 assembly elections, in which he was elected for the fourth consecutive time from the same constituency, he was re-appointed as the chief minister for the second time in May 2006. However, following an internal strife within the Congress party, and faced with revolt from his fellow lawmakers, Rangaswamy offered his resignation as the chief minister on 28 August 2008, and was succeeded by Vaithiligam as the chief minister on 4 September 2008. Later, on 21 January 2011, he resigned his position as the member of the legislative assembly, and quit the Congress party.

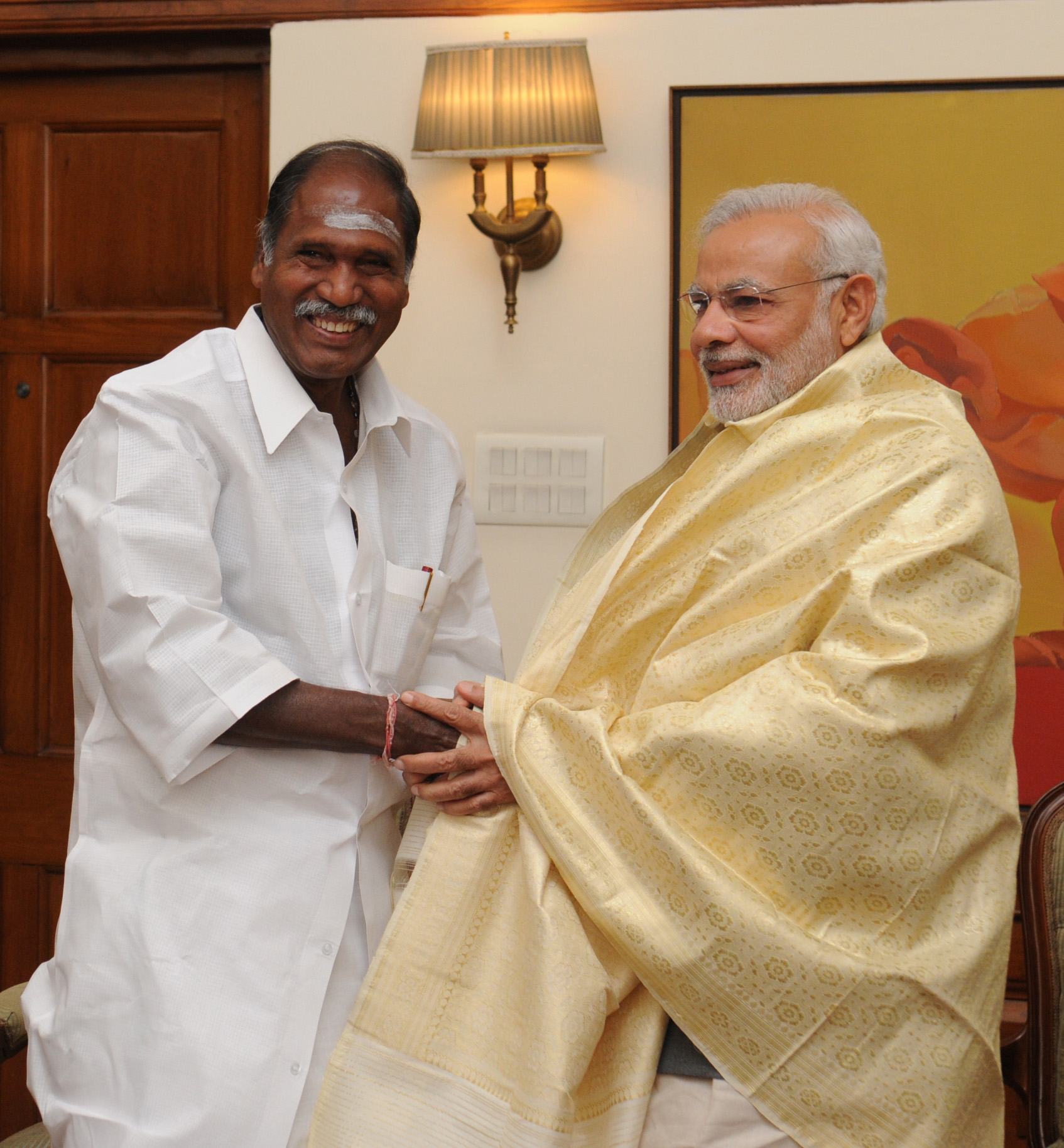
Rangaswamy with prime minister Narendra Modi in March 2015

Ahead of the 2011 assembly elections, Rangaswamy announced the formation of a new party, All India N.R. Congress (AINRC), on 7 February 2011. In the assembly elections held in April 2011, AINRC contested the elections in an alliance with the J. Jayalalithaa-led All India Anna Dravida Munnetra Kazhagam (AIADMK), and won 15 out of the 17 seats it contested. However, after the results, AINRC formed the government independently, with the support of an independent, which enabled it to get a majority in the 30-seat assembly. Rangaswamy won from the Kadirkamam Assembly constituency, and was sworn in the chief minister of Puducherry for the third time on 16 May 2011.

In the 2016 assembly elections, AINRC was not part of any coalition after the AIADMK refused an alliance, and contested alone in all the 30 seats. Though Rangaswamy won from the Indira Nagar Assembly constituency, the party won only eight seats in the assembly. Hence, Rangaswamy resigned as the chief minister on 6 June 2016. He later served as the leader of the opposition in the Puducherry assembly from August 2016 to February 2021.

After the Puducherry government led by V. Narayanasamy lost a trust vote in the assembly in February 2021, the 2021 legislative assembly elections were held in April 2021. The AINRC became part of the National Democratic Alliance and allied with the Bharatiya Janata Party (BJP) and the AIADMK. The NDA won 16 seats with AINRC winning 10 of the 16 seats it contested in the elections. While Rangaswamy won from Indira Nagar, he lost from the Yanam constituency against independent candidate Gollapalli Srinivas Ashok. He was sworn in as the chief minister of Puducherry for the fourth time on 7 May 2021 with the support of the BJP and independents. In the 2026 assembly election, Rangasamy-led AINRC continued in the NDA with the BJP, and won a majority in the elections. Rangaswamy was sworn in as the chief minister for the fifth time on 13 May 2026.

== Policies and governance ==
Rangaswamy is known as "junior Kamaraj" for his simple lifestyle, and soft-spoken nature. He earned the title "Makkal Mudhalvar" (people’s chief minister) for his reforms in education, poverty alleviation, and public welfare. During his tenure as chief minister, he had focused on regional development, local administrative reforms, and improved civic infrastructure. He introduced several welfare and development schemes such as the "Perunthalaivar Kamarajar Housing Scheme" to make Puducherry a hut-free region by providing a ₹0.1 million (US$1,100) subsidy for concrete houses, the "Rajiv Gandhi Breakfast Scheme" offering breakfast and milk to government school students, the "Kamaraj Education Assistance Scheme" reimbursing tuition fees for under privileged students studying in professional colleges under the government quota, distribution of free text books and other equipments to school students, and pension scheme for the aged. He also implemented drinking water facilities through construction of overhead tanks.

== Elections contested and results ==
Year	Constituency	Party	Votes	%	Opponent		Votes	%	Result	Margin	%
1990	Thattanchavady	INC	8,521	46.00	JD	V. Pethaperumal	9,503	51.31	Lost	982	5.30
1991	Thattanchavady	INC	12,545	69.71	JD	V. Pethaperumal	5,285	29.37	Won	7,260	40.34
1996	Thattanchavady	INC	9,989	42.95	JD	V. Pethaperumal	7,699	33.11	Won	2,290	9.85
2001	Thattanchavady	INC	14,323	58.90	JD(U)	V. Pethaperumal	8,769	36.06	Won	5,554	22.84
2006	Thattanchavady	INC	27,024	90.16	AIADMK	T. Gunasekaran	2,026	6.76	Won	24,998	83.40
2011	Kadirgamam	AINRC	16,323	70.02	INC	V. Pethaperumal	6,566	28.16	Won	9,757	41.86
2011	Indira Nagar	AINRC	20,685	83.77	INC	V. Aroumougam	4,008	16.23	Won	16,677	67.54
2016	Indira Nagar	AINRC	15,463	52.53	INC	V. Aroumougam	12,059	41.09	Won	3,404	11.44
2021	Yanam	AINRC	16,477	47.20	IND	Gollapalli Srinivas Ashok	17,132	49.07	Lost	655	1.88
2021	Thattanchavady	AINRC	12,978	55.02	CPI	K. Sethu	7,522	31.89	Won	5,456	23.13
2026	Thattanchavady	AINRC	10,024	42.51	NMK	E. Vinayagam	5,583	23.68	Won	4,441	18.83
2026	Mangalam	AINRC	17,917	50.61	DMK	S. S. Rangan	10,867	30.69	Won	7,050	19.92

Political offices
Preceded by P Shanmugam	Chief Minister of Puducherry; 27 October 2001 – 4 September 2008	Succeeded by V Vaithilingam
Preceded by V Vaithilingam	Chief Minister of Puducherry; 16 May 2011 – 6 June 2016	Succeeded by Narayanasamy
Preceded by President's rule	Chief Minister of Puducherry; 7 May 2021 -	Incumbent
