= P. Angalane =

Indian politician

Member of Puducherry Legislative Assembly
- Incumbent
- Assumed office 2 May 2021
- Preceded by: B. Kobiga
- Constituency: Thirubuvanai

Personal details
- Party: Independent
- Other political affiliations: Indian National Congress; All India N.R. Congress
- Education: M. A.
- Alma mater: Annamalai University
- Profession: Agriculture

P. Angalane is an independent politician. He was elected as a member of the Puducherry Legislative Assembly from Thirubuvanai (constituency). He defeated B. Kobiga of All India N.R. Congress by 2,359 votes in 2021 Puducherry Assembly election.
