= A. Baskar =

Indian politician

A. Baskar is an Indian politician and was a member of the 14th Tamil Nadu Legislative Assembly from the Dharmapuri constituency. He represented the Desiya Murpokku Dravidar Kazhagam party.

The elections of 2016 resulted in his constituency being won by P. Subramani.
