= List of leaders of the opposition in the Puducherry Legislative Assembly =

Leader of Opposition in Union territory of PY

The leader of the opposition in the Puducherry Legislative Assembly is the politician who leads the official opposition in the Puducherry Legislative Assembly in India. The current leader of the opposition is A. M. H Nazeem.

== Puducherry Representative Assembly (1955-1963) ==
The tenure of different leaders of opposition of Puducherry Representative Assembly is given below

No.	Portrait	Name (Birth–Death)	Elected constituency	Term of office			Assembly (Election)	Political party (Note: This column only names the Leader of opposition's party. The opposition he heads may be a complex coalition of several parties and independents; these are not listed here.)
No.	Portrait	Name (Birth–Death)	Elected constituency	Assumed office	Left office	Time in office	Assembly (Election)	Political party
1		V. Kailassa Soubaya (1911–1993)	Murungapakkam-Nainar Mandapam	17 August 1955	24 October 1958	3 years, 68 days	1st (1955 election)	People's Front
1		V. Kailassa Soubaya (1911–1993)	Murungapakkam-Nainar Mandapam	September 1959	30 June 1963	3 years, 302 days	2nd (1959 election)	People's Front

== Puducherry Legislative Assembly (since 1963) ==
The tenure of different leaders of opposition of Puducherry Legislative Assembly is given below

No.	Portrait	Name (Birth–Death)	Elected constituency	Term of office			Assembly (Election)	Political party
No.	Portrait	Name (Birth–Death)	Elected constituency	Assumed office	Left office	Time in office	Assembly (Election)	Political party
1		V. Kailassa Soubaya (1911–1993)	Murungapakkam	1 July 1963	24 August 1964	1 year, 54 days	1st (1959 election)	People's Front
1		V. Kailassa Soubaya (1911–1993)	Mudaliarpet	29 August 1964	17 September 1968	4 years, 19 days	2nd (1964 election)	People's Front
2		P. Shanmugam (1927–2013)	N.A.	17 March 1969	2 January 1974	4 years, 291 days	3rd (1968 election)	Indian National Congress
3		Dana Kantharaj	Raj Bhavan	6 March 1974	27 March 1974	21 days	4th (1974 election)	Indian National Congress
4		P. Ansari Doraisamy (c.1917–N.A.)	Cassicade	2 July 1977	11 November 1978	1 year, 132 days	5th (1977 election)	Janata Party
5		P. Uthiravelu	Bahour	16 January 1980	23 November 1983	3 years, 311 days	6th (1980 election)	Congress (Indira)
6		P. K. Loganathan (1938–2013)	Oupalam	16 March 1985	4 March 1990	4 years, 353 days	7th (1985 election)	All India Anna Dravida Munnetra Kazhagam
7		M.O.H. Farook	Lawspet	5 March 1990	3 March 1991	363 days	8th (1990 election)	Indian National Congress
8		V. M. C. V. Ganapathy (1960–)	Neravy T. R. Pattinam	4 July 1991	13 May 1996	4 years, 314 days	9th (1991 election)	All India Anna Dravida Munnetra Kazhagam
9		V. Vaithilingam	Nettapakkam	14 May 1996	21 March 2000	3 years, 312 days	10th (1996 election)	Indian National Congress
10		R.V. Janakiraman	Nellithope	22 March 2000	15 May 2001	1 year, 54 days	10th (1996 election)	Dravida Munnetra Kazhagam
10		R.V. Janakiraman	Nellithope	16 May 2001	11 May 2006	4 years, 360 days	11th (2001 election)	Dravida Munnetra Kazhagam
11		A. M. H. Nazeem	Karaikal	29 May 2006	May 2011	4 years, 337 days	12th (2006 election)	Dravida Munnetra Kazhagam
(9)		V. Vaithilingam	Kamaraj Nagar	17 August 2011	2016	5 years, 136 days	13th (2011 election)	Indian National Congress
12		N. Rangasamy	Indira Nagar	22 August 2016	22 February 2021	4 years, 184 days	14th (2016 election)	All India N.R. Congress
13		R. Siva	Villianur	8 May 2021	04 May 2026	4 years, 361 days	15th (2021 election)	Dravida Munnetra Kazhagam
14		A. M. H. Nazeem	Karaikal South	20 May 2026	Till date	80 days	16th (2026 election)	Dravida Munnetra Kazhagam

== See also ==
- Government of Puducherry
- Lieutenant Governors of Puducherry
- Chief Minister of Puducherry
- Puducherry Legislative Assembly
- Speaker of the Puducherry Legislative Assembly
- Leader of the Opposition in the Parliament of India
- List of current Indian opposition leaders
- Elections in Puducherry
