= 2nd Pondicherry Assembly =

2nd Assembly of Pondicherry
←	First Assembly of Pondicherry	3rd Pondicherry Assembly	→

Overview
- Legislative body: Pondicherry Legislative Assembly
- Term: 29 August 1964 – 19 September 1968
- Election: 1964 Pondicherry Legislative Assembly election
- Government: Indian National Congress
- Opposition: People's Front
- Members: 30

The Second Assembly of Pondicherry Deuxième Assemblée de Pondichéry (29 August 1964 – 19 September 1968) succeeded the First Assembly of Pondicherry and was constituted after the victory of Indian National Congress (INC) and allies in the 1964 assembly election held on 23 August 1964. Venkatasubba Reddiar assumed office as 2nd Pondicherry. These were the first Legislative Assembly elections after the formation of the new Union Territory.

== Background ==
The Pondicherry Representative Assembly was converted into the Legislative Assembly of Pondicherry on 1 July 1963 as per Section 54(3) of The Union Territories Act, 1963 and its members were deemed to have been elected to the First Assembly. All the 30 members of this assembly were elected through direct suffrage, under the Government of Union Territories Act, 1963. However, its term was fixed to expire on 24 August 1964. This necessitated the 1964 assembly election to constitute the Second Assembly of Pondicherry.

== Reduction in size of assembly ==
Under the provisions of The Union Territories Act, 1963, the strength of the Legislative Assembly of Pondicherry has been reduced to 30. Similarly, Five seats were reserved for Scheduled Castes. Out of them, four were reserved in Pondicherry and the remaining one in Karikal.

== Important members ==
- Speaker:
  - M.O.H. Farook from 19 September 1964 to 19 March 1967
  - P. Shanmugam from 30 March 1967 to 9 March 1968
- Chief minister:
  - V. Venkatasubba Reddiar from 29 August 1964 - 19 September 1968
- Leader of opposition:
  - V. Subbiah from 29 August 1964 - 19 September 1968

== Members elected ==
Keys: INC (22) People's Front (4) Independent (4)

=== Pondicherry Region ===
No.	Constituency	Name of elected M.L.A.	Party affiliation
1	Muthialpet	P. Shanmugham	Indian National Congress
2	Couroussoucoupom	Padmini Chandrasekar	Indian National Congress
3	Cassicade	A.S. Kankeyan	Indian National Congress
4	Raj Nivas	Édouard Goubert	Indian National Congress
5	Bussy Street	C.M. Achraff	Independent
6	Oupalom	G. Perumal Raja	Independent
7	Nellithope	N. Ranganathan	People's Front
8	Mudaliarpeth	V. Kailasa Subbiah	People's Front
9	Ariancoupom	P. Rathinavelu	Indian National Congress
10	Courouvinattam	Subramanya Padayachi	Independent
11	Bahour	C. Thangavelu	People's Front
12	Netapacom	Venkatasubba Reddy	Indian National Congress
13	Tiroubouvane	R. Kulandai	Indian National Congress
14	Mannadipet	Manickavasaga Reddiar	Indian National Congress
15	Oussoudou	N. Harikrishnan	Indian National Congress
16	Villenour	Thillai Kanakarasu	Indian National Congress
17	Embalam	P. Angammal	Indian National Congress
18	Oulgaret	S. Govindasamy	Indian National Congress
19	Calapeth	Jeevarathina Udayar	Indian National Congress
20	Poudoussaram	N. Gurusamy	People's Front

=== Karikal Region ===
No.	Constituency	Name of elected M.L.A.	Party affiliation
21	Cotchery	G. Nagarajan	Indian National Congress
22	Karaikal North	Farook Maricar	Indian National Congress
23	Karaikal South	Mohamed Ibrahim Maricar	Independent
24	Neravy	Nagamuttou Pillai	Indian National Congress
25	Grand Aldee	Subarayalu	Indian National Congress
26	Tirounallar	V.M.C. Varadha Pillai	Indian National Congress
27	Nedoungadu	P. Shanmugham	Indian National Congress

=== Mahe Region ===
No.	Constituency	Name of elected M.L.A.	Party affiliation
28	Mahe	Valavil Keshavan	Indian National Congress
29	Palloor	Vanmeri Nadeyi Purushothaman	Indian National Congress

=== Yanam Region ===
No.	Constituency	Name of elected M.L.A.	Party affiliation
30	Yanam	Kamichetty Sri Parasurama Varaprasada Rao Naidu	Indian National Congress

== See also ==
- Government of Puducherry
- List of chief ministers of Puducherry
- Puducherry Legislative Assembly
- Pondicherry Representative Assembly
- 1964 Pondicherry Legislative Assembly election
