= Elections in Puducherry =

Overview of the procedure of elections in the Indian union territory of Puducherry

Elections in the Indian union territory of Puducherry are conducted every five years to elect members to the Puducherry Legislative Assembly and members of parliament to the Lok Sabha. There are 30 assembly constituencies and 1 Lok Sabha constituency. The union territory has conducted 15 assembly elections and 15 Lok Sabha elections since independence.

The lieutenant governor of Puducherry is the ceremonial head of the union territory. However, it is the chief minister of Puducherry who is elected as the leader of the party or political alliance having a majority in the Puducherry Legislative Assembly. The chief minister will be the leader of the executive branch of the government of Puducherry. The chief minister is the chief adviser to the lieutenant governor of Puducherry and the head of the union territory council of ministers.

== Elections ==
The Election Commission of India (ECI) is responsible for monitoring and administering the elections for the Rajya Sabha (Council of States) and Lok Sabha (House of the People) of the Parliament and the Puducherry Legislative Assembly. The ECI appoints the chief electoral officer of Puducherry, an I.A.S. officer who oversees state-level election matters.

The Puducherry Election Commission is the state body of Puducherry that is enacted under the provisions of the constitution and is responsible for monitoring and administering the elections for local government in Puducherry. This body is responsible for ensuring elections are free and fair, without any bias.

Elections ensure the conduct of members pre-elections, during elections, and post-elections is as per statutory legislation.

The election commission handles all election-related disputes. If the laws enacted to deal with the given situation in conducting elections are silent or do not make adequate provisions, the Madras High Court has ruled that the Election Commission has residual powers to act appropriately under the constitution.

== Types of elections ==
Elections in Puducherry include elections for:

- Members of Parliament in the Rajya Sabha (Upper House)
- Members of Parliament in the Lok Sabha (Lower House)
- Members of the Puducherry Legislative Assembly
- Members of local governance bodies (municipal bodies and panchayats)
- A bye-election is held when the elected member of a particular constituency dies, resigns, or is disqualified.

== Rajya Sabha elections ==
Members of parliament in the Rajya Sabha (Council of States) from Puducherry are not directly elected by being voted upon by all adult citizens of the union territory but by the members of the Puducherry Legislative Assembly. Candidates who win the Rajya Sabha elections are called "Members of Parliament" and hold their seats for six years. The house meets in the Rajya Sabha Chamber of the Sansad Bhavan in New Delhi on matters relating to the creation of new laws or removing or improving the existing laws that affect all citizens of India. Elections take place to elect one member from Puducherry.

== Lok Sabha elections ==
Members of parliament in the Lok Sabha (House of the People) from Puducherry are directly elected by being voted upon by all adult citizens of the union territory from a set of candidates who stand in their respective constituencies. Every adult citizen of India can vote only in their constituency. Candidates who win the Lok Sabha elections are called "Members of Parliament" and hold their seats for five years or until the body is dissolved by the president of India on the advice of the council of ministers. The house meets in the Lok Sabha Chamber of the Sansad Bhavan in New Delhi on matters relating to the creation of new laws or removing or improving the existing laws that affect all citizens of India. Elections take place once every five years to elect one member from Puducherry.

=== History of Lok Sabha elections ===
Colour key for parties
All India Anna Dravida Munnetra Kazhagam
All India N.R. Congress
Dravida Munnetra Kazhagam
Indian National Congress
Indian National Congress (Indira)
Pattali Makkal Katchi

LOK SABHA ELECTIONS
Election	Lok Sabha	Total Seat	Political Party	Percentage of Votes
1967	4th	1	Indian National Congress	39.83%
1971	5th	1	Indian National Congress	66.27%
1977	6th	1	All India Anna Dravida Munnetra Kazhagam	53.32%
1980	7th	1	Indian National Congress (Indira)	66.45%
1984	8th	1	Indian National Congress	58.86%
1989	9th	1	Indian National Congress	50.47%
1991	10th	1	Indian National Congress	53.07%
1996	11th	1	Indian National Congress	39.97%
1998	12th	1	Dravida Munnetra Kazhagam	41.11%
1999	13th	1	Indian National Congress	37.17%
2004	14th	1	Pattali Makkal Katchi	49.95%
2009	15th	1	Indian National Congress	49.41%
2014	16th	1	All India N.R. Congress	35.64%
2019	17th	1	Indian National Congress	57.16%
2024	18th	1	Indian National Congress	52.73%

== Legislative Assembly elections ==
Members of the Puducherry Legislative Assembly are directly elected by being voted upon by all adult citizens of the union territory from a set of candidates who stand in their respective constituencies. Every adult citizen of India can vote only in their constituency. Candidates who win the legislative assembly elections are called "Members of the Legislative Assembly" and hold their seats for five years or until the body is dissolved by the lieutenant governor of Puducherry on the advice of the council of ministers. The house meets in the Assembly Chamber of the Chief Secretariat in Puducherry on matters relating to the creation of new laws or removing or improving the existing laws that affect all citizens of Puducherry. Elections take place once every five years to elect 30 members to the legislative assembly. The leader of the majority party or alliance takes oath as chief minister of Puducherry.

=== History of Legislative Assembly elections ===
Colour key for parties
All India Anna Dravida Munnetra Kazhagam
All India N.R. Congress
Bharatiya Janata Party
Communist Party of India
Dravida Munnetra Kazhagam
Independent
Indian National Congress
Indian National Congress (Indira)
Indian National Congress (Organisation)
Janata Dal
Janata Party
People's Front
Puducherry Makkal Congress
Tamil Maanila Congress (Moopanar)

LEGISLATIVE ASSEMBLY ELECTIONS
Assembly (Election)	Total Seats	First			Second			Third		
Assembly (Election)	Total Seats	Political party	Seats	Percentage of votes	Political party	Seats	Percentage of votes	Political party	Seats	Percentage of votes
2nd (1964)	30	Indian National Congress	21	52.07%	Independent	5	29.75%	People's Front	4	18.19%
3rd (1969)	30	Dravida Munnetra Kazhagam	15	33.70%	Indian National Congress	10	42.62%	Communist Party of India	3	12.62%
4th (1974)	30	All India Anna Dravida Munnetra Kazhagam	12	27.83%	Indian National Congress	7	15.95%	Indian National Congress (Organisation)	5	18.92%
5th (1977)	30	All India Anna Dravida Munnetra Kazhagam	14	30.96%	Janata Party	7	26.45%	Dravida Munnetra Kazhagam	3	13.49%
6th (1980)	30	Dravida Munnetra Kazhagam	14	27.73%	Indian National Congress (Indira)	10	23.92%	Janata Party	3	9.33%
7th (1985)	30	Indian National Congress	15	32.68%	All India Anna Dravida Munnetra Kazhagam	6	15.75%	Dravida Munnetra Kazhagam	5	29.08%
8th (1990)	30	Indian National Congress	11	25.04%	Dravida Munnetra Kazhagam	9	24.07%	Janata Dal	4	18.17%
9th (1991)	30	Indian National Congress	15	30.00%	All India Anna Dravida Munnetra Kazhagam	6	17.34%	Dravida Munnetra Kazhagam	4	24.71%
10th (1996)	30	Indian National Congress	9	25.34%	Dravida Munnetra Kazhagam	7	22.90%	Tamil Maanila Congress (Moopanar)	5	9.23%
11th (2001)	30	Indian National Congress	11	22.78%	Dravida Munnetra Kazhagam	7	17.54%	Puducherry Makkal Congress	4	10.24%
12th (2006)	30	Indian National Congress	10	29.91%	Dravida Munnetra Kazhagam	7	12.59%	All India Anna Dravida Munnetra Kazhagam	3	16.04%
13th (2011)	30	All India N.R. Congress	15	31.75%	Indian National Congress	7	26.53%	All India Anna Dravida Munnetra Kazhagam	5	13.75%
14th (2016)	30	Indian National Congress	15	30.60%	All India N.R. Congress	8	28.12%	All India Anna Dravida Munnetra Kazhagam	4	16.82%
15th (2021)	30	All India N.R. Congress	10	25.85%	Dravida Munnetra Kazhagam	6	18.51%	Bharatiya Janata Party	6	13.66%
16th (2026)	30	All India N.R. Congress	12	23.12%	Dravida Munnetra Kazhagam	5	13.74%	Bharatiya Janata Party	4	12.19%

== Bye-election ==
When an elected member of the Rajya Sabha, Lok Sabha, or Puducherry Legislative Assembly left their office vacant before their term ended, a bye-election was conducted to find a suitable replacement to fill the vacant position.

Common reasons for bye-elections:

- Resignation of the sitting M.P. or an M.L.A.
- Death of the sitting M.P. or an M.L.A.

There are also other reasons that occur when the incumbent is disqualified for being ineligible to continue in office (criminal conviction, failure to maintain a minimum level of attendance in the office due to election irregularities found later, or when a candidate wins more than one seat and has to vacate one).

== See also ==
- Lok Sabha
- Rajya Sabha
- Elections in India
- Parliament of India
- History of Puducherry
- Government of Puducherry
- Puducherry Legislative Assembly
