= 3rd Pondicherry Assembly =

Indian legislative body

3rd Assembly of Pondicherry
←	2nd Assembly of Pondicherry	4th Pondicherry Assembly	→

Overview
- Legislative body: Pondicherry Legislative Assembly
- Term: 17 March 1969 – 3 January 1974
- Election: 1969 Pondicherry Legislative Assembly election
- Government: Dravida Munnetra Kazhagam
- Opposition: Indian National Congress
- Members: 30

The Third Assembly of Pondicherry Troisième Assemblée de Pondichéry (17 March 1969 - 3 January 1974) succeeded the Second Assembly of Pondicherry and was constituted after the victory of Indian National Congress (INC) and allies in the 1969 Pondicherry Legislative Assembly election. These were the second Legislative Assembly elections after the formation of the new Union Territory. After the elections M. O. H. Farook of Dravida Munnetra Kazhagam got elected as chief minister.

== See also ==
- Government of Puducherry
- List of chief ministers of Puducherry
- Puducherry Legislative Assembly
- Pondicherry Representative Assembly
- 1964 Pondicherry Legislative Assembly election
