= Karaikal South Assembly constituency =

Constituency of the Puducherry legislative assembly in India

Coordinates: 10.913°N 79.836°E

Karaikal-South
- Constituency No. 27 for the Puducherry Legislative Assembly
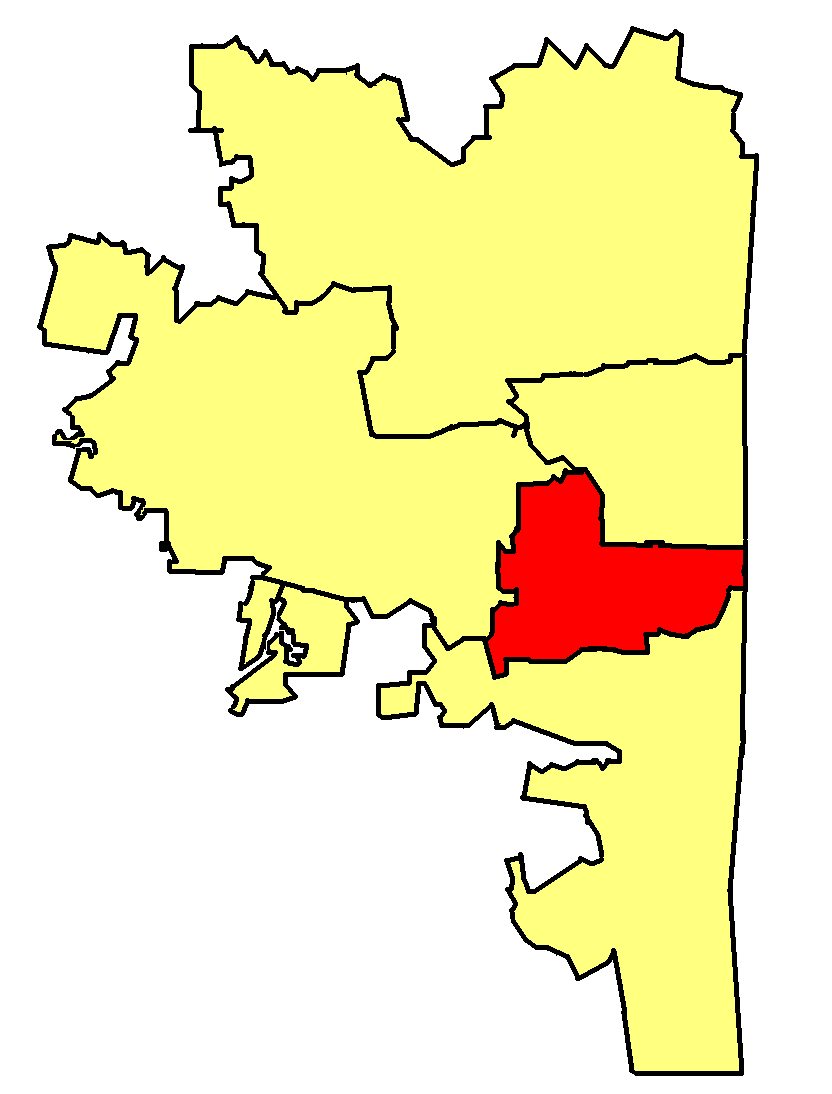

Constituency details
- Country: India
- Region: South India
- Union Territory: Puducherry
- District: Karaikal
- Lok Sabha constituency: Puducherry
- Established: 1964
- Total electors: 31,891
- Reservation: None

Member of Legislative Assembly
- 16th Puducherry Legislative Assembly
- Incumbent A.M.H. Nazeem
- Party: Dravida Munnetra Kazhagam
- Elected year: 2021

Karaikal South is a legislative assembly constituency in the Union territory of Puducherry in India. Karaikal South Assembly constituency was part of Puducherry Lok Sabha constituency.

== Members of Legislative Assembly ==
Year	Member	Political party
1964	Mohamed Ibrahim Maricar	Indian National Congress
1974	S. Ramassamy	All India Anna Dravida Munnetra Kazhagam
1977	S. Ramassamy	All India Anna Dravida Munnetra Kazhagam
1980	S. Savarirajan	Indian National Congress (I)
1985	S. Ramassamy	Independent
1990	S. Ramassamy	All India Anna Dravida Munnetra Kazhagam
1991	A. V. Subramanian	Indian National Congress
1996	A. V. Subramanian	Indian National Congress
2001	A. V. Subramanian	Indian National Congress
2006	V. K. Ganapathy	Puducherry Munnetra Congress
2011	A. M. H. Nazeem	Dravida Munnetra Kazhagam
2016	K. A. U. Asana	All India Anna Dravida Munnetra Kazhagam
2021	A. M. H. Nazeem	Dravida Munnetra Kazhagam
2026	A. M. H. Nazeem	Dravida Munnetra Kazhagam

== Election results ==
Vote share of winning candidates
2021	71.15%
2016	46.64%
2011	39.37%
2006	55.06%
2001	51.39%
1996	57.48%
1991	61.10%
1990	56.32%
1985	46.73%
1980	64.40%
1977	47.36%
1974	46.80%
1969	50.91%
1964	50.70%

=== Assembly Election 2026 ===
2026 Puducherry Legislative Assembly election: Karaikal (South)
Party	Candidate	Votes	%	±%
DMK	A. M. H. Nazeem	12,543	49.15	▼22.00
INC	A. V. S. Sakthivel Prabu	6,681	26.18	
TVK	K. A. U. Assana	4,346	17.03	
BJP	M. Arul Murugan	1,354	5.31	
NOTA	NOTA	142	0.56	▼0.34
Margin of victory		5,862	22.97	▼26.24
Turnout		25,522		
Registered electors		29,964		
DMK hold		Swing		

=== Assembly Election 2021 ===
2021 Puducherry Legislative Assembly election: Karaikal South
Party	Candidate	Votes	%	±%
DMK	A. M. H. Nazeem	17,401	71.15	24.60
AIADMK	K. A. U. Asana	5,367	21.95	−24.69
Independent	A. Ramprasad	435	1.78	
NOTA	Nota	221	0.90	−0.56
Amma Makkal Munnettra Kazagam	S. Mohamed Seedique	132	0.54	
Margin of victory		12,034	49.21	49.12
Turnout		24,456	76.54	0.44
Registered electors		31,951		2.13
DMK gain from AIADMK		Swing	24.51	

=== Assembly Election 2016 ===
2016 Puducherry Legislative Assembly election: Karaikal South
Party	Candidate	Votes	%	±%
AIADMK	K. A. U. Asana	11,104	46.64	
DMK	A. M. H. Nazeem	11,084	46.56	7.19
AINRC	A. Suresh	393	1.65	
NOTA	None of the Above	349	1.47	
BJP	G. Manikandan	268	1.13	
SDPI	H. Mohamed Bilal Maricar	258	1.08	
DMDK	Pranadartigareswaran @ Mouttouvel	119	0.50	−27.54
Margin of victory		20	0.08	−7.32
Turnout		23,808	76.10	−3.29
Registered electors		31,286		16.73
AIADMK gain from DMK		Swing	7.27	

=== Assembly Election 2011 ===
2011 Puducherry Legislative Assembly election: Karaikal South
Party	Candidate	Votes	%	±%
DMK	A. M. H. Nazeem	8,377	39.37	
Independent	V. K. Ganapathy	6,801	31.96	
DMDK	K. A. U. Asana	5,966	28.04	27.38
BSP	Selvamani	134	0.63	
Margin of victory		1,576	7.41	−4.61
Turnout		21,278	79.39	−7.35
Registered electors		26,802		60.61
DMK gain from PMC		Swing	-15.69	

=== Assembly Election 2006 ===
2006 Pondicherry Legislative Assembly election: Karaikal South
Party	Candidate	Votes	%	±%
PMC	V. K. Ganapathy	7,970	55.06	
INC	A. V. Subramanian	6,231	43.05	−8.35
Independent	S. A. Mugamudu Yusuf	102	0.70	
DMDK	P. Antoinete	95	0.66	
Margin of victory		1,739	12.01	4.40
Turnout		14,475	86.74	16.89
Registered electors		16,688		−2.46
PMC gain from INC		Swing	3.67	

=== Assembly Election 2001 ===
2001 Pondicherry Legislative Assembly election: Karaikal South
Party	Candidate	Votes	%	±%
INC	A. V. Subramanian	6,138	51.39	−6.08
PMC	V. K. Ganapathy	5,229	43.78	
AIADMK	S. P. Karuppaiya	322	2.70	
Independent	A. Sainathan	103	0.86	
Independent	H. Sulthan Shah	85	0.71	
Independent	Madhana Marimuthu	66	0.55	
Margin of victory		909	7.61	−9.25
Turnout		11,943	69.85	4.15
Registered electors		17,109		9.27
INC hold		Swing	-9.70	

=== Assembly Election 1996 ===
1996 Pondicherry Legislative Assembly election: Karaikal South
Party	Candidate	Votes	%	±%
INC	A. V. Subramanian	6,676	57.48	−3.62
DMK	S. Savarirajan	4,717	40.61	3.85
BJP	Kalpakam Ganesan	106	0.91	
JD	A. M. Ismail	103	0.89	
Margin of victory		1,959	16.87	−7.47
Turnout		11,615	75.45	9.76
Registered electors		15,658		−0.71
INC hold		Swing	-3.62	

=== Assembly Election 1991 ===
1991 Pondicherry Legislative Assembly election: Karaikal South
Party	Candidate	Votes	%	±%
INC	A. V. Subramanian	6,189	61.10	
DMK	S. Savarirajan	3,724	36.76	−2.85
Independent	S. M. Vappu Maricar	91	0.90	
Pondicherry Mannila Makkal Munnani	M. Mani	79	0.78	
Margin of victory		2,465	24.33	7.62
Turnout		10,130	65.69	−3.03
Registered electors		15,770		0.69
INC gain from AIADMK		Swing	4.77	

=== Assembly Election 1990 ===
1990 Pondicherry Legislative Assembly election: Karaikal South
Party	Candidate	Votes	%	±%
AIADMK	S. Ramassamy	6,012	56.32	
DMK	S. Savarirajan	4,228	39.61	16.01
Independent	M. Murugan	246	2.30	
THMM	Raja Alias S. Gulmohamed Ali	69	0.65	
Margin of victory		1,784	16.71	−0.65
Turnout		10,674	68.72	−4.83
Registered electors		15,662		39.89
AIADMK gain from Independent		Swing	9.59	

=== Assembly Election 1985 ===
1985 Pondicherry Legislative Assembly election: Karaikal South
Party	Candidate	Votes	%	±%
Independent	S. Ramassamy	3,808	46.73	
INC	A. M. Kassim	2,393	29.37	
DMK	R. Arumaikannu	1,923	23.60	
Margin of victory		1,415	17.36	−17.69
Turnout		8,149	73.55	−4.62
Registered electors		11,196		12.53
Independent gain from INC(I)		Swing	-17.67	

=== Assembly Election 1980 ===
1980 Pondicherry Legislative Assembly election: Karaikal South
Party	Candidate	Votes	%	±%
INC(I)	S. Savarirajan	4,867	64.40	
AIADMK	S. Ramassamy	2,218	29.35	−18.01
INC(U)	K. Kandhi	447	5.92	
Margin of victory		2,649	35.05	25.01
Turnout		7,557	78.17	6.27
Registered electors		9,949		−2.07
INC(I) gain from AIADMK		Swing	17.05	

=== Assembly Election 1977 ===
1977 Pondicherry Legislative Assembly election: Karaikal South
Party	Candidate	Votes	%	±%
AIADMK	S. Ramassamy	3,424	47.36	0.56
JP	S. Savarirajan	2,698	37.32	
DMK	N. Ramasamy	570	7.88	
INC	A. Mariakulandai	335	4.63	
Independent	G. Rethinavel	203	2.81	
Margin of victory		726	10.04	−10.39
Turnout		7,230	71.90	−12.96
Registered electors		10,159		19.18
AIADMK hold		Swing	0.56	

=== Assembly Election 1974 ===
1974 Pondicherry Legislative Assembly election: Karaikal South
Party	Candidate	Votes	%	±%
AIADMK	S. Ramassamy	3,296	46.80	
INC(O)	S. Savarirajan	1,857	26.37	
Independent	A. M. Kaliappan	1,814	25.76	
Independent	G. Rethinavel	76	1.08	
Margin of victory		1,439	20.43	12.12
Turnout		7,043	84.85	13.14
Registered electors		8,524		25.19
AIADMK gain from DMK		Swing	-4.11	

=== Assembly Election 1969 ===
1969 Pondicherry Legislative Assembly election: Karaikal South
Party	Candidate	Votes	%	±%
DMK	Marie Lourdes Silvaradjou	2,439	50.91	
INC	N. M. Mohamed Yussouf	2,041	42.60	−6.70
Independent	P. M. Ambigasundaramoorthy	311	6.49	
Margin of victory		398	8.31	6.90
Turnout		4,791	71.71	−7.45
Registered electors		6,809		7.74
DMK gain from Independent		Swing	0.21	

=== Assembly Election 1964 ===
1964 Pondicherry Legislative Assembly election: Karaikal South
Party	Candidate	Votes	%	±%
Independent	Mohamed Ibrahim Maricar	2,491	50.70	
INC	Ramassamy Pillai	2,422	49.30	
Margin of victory		69	1.40	
Turnout		4,913	79.16	
Registered electors		6,320		
Independent win (new seat)				

== See also ==
- List of constituencies of the Puducherry Legislative Assembly
- Karaikal district
