= S. Ramassamy =

Indian politician

Chief Minister of Pondicherry
- In office 2 July 1977 – 12 November 1978
- Lieutenant Governor: B. T. Kulkarni
- Preceded by: President's rule
- Succeeded by: M. D. R. Ramachandran
- Constituency: Karaikal South
- In office 6 March 1974 – 28 March 1974
- Lieutenant Governor: Cheddi Lal
- Preceded by: President's rule
- Succeeded by: M. O. H. Farook
- Constituency: Karaikal South

Personal details
- Born: 5 June 1939 Karaikal, Puducherry
- Died: 15 May 2017 (aged 77) Karaikal, Puducherry, India
- Party: All India Anna Dravida Munnetra Kazhagam
- Education: Annamalai University, Chidambaram, Tamil Nadu

Subrahmanyan Ramassamy (5 June 1939 – 15 May 2017) was an Indian politician who was the fourth Chief Minister of the Union Territory of Puducherry, then Pondicherry. He served 3rd Assembly from 6 March 1974 to 28 March 1974 and 4th Assembly from 2 July 1977 to 12 November 1978.

== Political career ==
Ramaswamy started his political career in Dravida Munnetra Kazhagam and became the Home Minister of Pondicherry in the Dravida Munnetra Kazhagam - Communist Party of India coalition ministry from 1969 to 1973 but soon after shifted his allegiance to the All India Anna Dravida Munnetra Kazhagam in 1973 a Party founded by M. G. Ramachandran in 1972 as a breakaway faction of the Dravida Munnetra Kazhagam.

In 1974 Pondicherry Legislative Assembly election, All India Anna Dravida Munnetra Kazhagam - Communist Party of India coalition came to power, and Ramaswamy was made Chief Minister for a brief period. He was again sworn in as Chief Minister in 1977 that lasted in office for a little over one year. He successfully contested as Independent from Karaikal in 1985. Later, Ramaswamy joined Congress in 1992.

== Electoral history ==
- Member of the Legislative Assembly

Year	Post	Constituency	Party
1969	M.L.A	Neravy – T. R. Pattinam	DMK
1974	M.L.A	Karaikal South	AIADMK
1977	M.L.A	Karaikal South	AIADMK
1985	M.L.A	Karaikal South	IND
1990	M.L.A	Karaikal South	AIADMK

Preceded by M. O. H. Farook	Chief Minister of Pondicherry; 6 March 1974 – 28 March 1974	Succeeded by President's rule
Preceded by President's rule	Chief Minister of Pondicherry; 2 July 1977 – 12 November 1978	Succeeded by President's rule
