= List of nominated members of the Puducherry Legislative Assembly =

The Puducherry Legislative Assembly in the Indian Union Territory of Puducherry has 3 nominated members among its strength of 33 (the rest are elected from 30 single-seat constituencies). These nominated members have all the powers of an elected MLA, and are chosen by the central government.

== Nominated members ==
Nominated members of the Puducherry Lgislative Assembly
Assembly	Election	Member 1	Member 2	Member 3	Ref(s)
14th	2017	V. Saminathan	S. Selvaganapathy	K.G. Shankar	
15th	2021	R. B. Ashok Babu	K. Venkatesan	V. P. Ramalingam	

== See also ==
- List of constituencies of the Puducherry Legislative Assembly
- List of nominated members of the Rajya Sabha
