= M. D. R. Ramachandran =

Indian politician (1934–2024)

16th Speaker of the Pondicherry Legislative Assembly
- In office 11 June 2001 – 26 May 2006
- Preceded by: A. V. Subramanian
- Succeeded by: R. Radhakrishnan

8th Chief Minister of Pondicherry
- In office 8 March 1990 – 3 March 1991
- Preceded by: M. O. H. Farook
- Succeeded by: V. Vaithilingam
- In office 16 January 1980 – 23 June 1983
- Preceded by: S. Ramasamy
- Succeeded by: M. O. H. Farook

Personal details
- Born: 31 January 1934 Maducarai, French India
- Died: 8 December 2024 (aged 90) Pondicherry, India

Maducarai D. R. Ramachandran (31 January 1934 – 8 December 2024) was an Indian politician. He served as Chief Minister of Pondicherry from 1980 to 1983 and from 1990 to 1991, and as Speaker of the Pondicherry Legislative Assembly from 2001 to 2006. Born on 31 January 1934, he died on 8 December 2024, at the age of 90.

== Sources ==
- "Union Territory of Pondicherry". National Informatics Centre.
