= List of constituencies of the Puducherry Legislative Assembly =

Puducherry Legislative Assembly Assemblée législative de Pondichéry
- 15th Puducherry Assembly
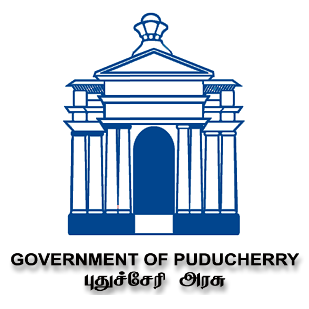

Type
- Type: Unicameral
- Term limits: 5 years

History
- Founded: 1 July 1963; 62 years ago
- Preceded by: Puducherry Representative Assembly

Elections
- Voting system: First-past-the-post
- Last election: 6 April 2021
- Next election: 2026

Meeting place
- Puducherry Legislative Assembly

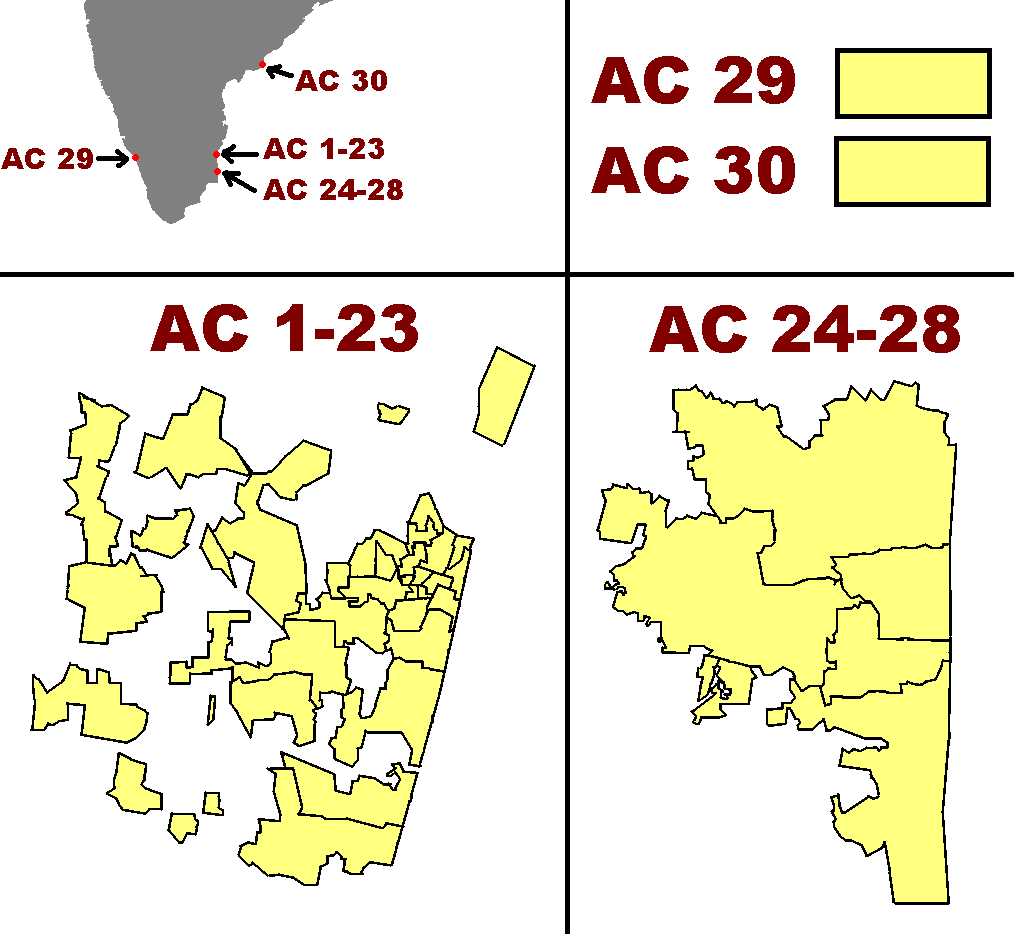
Map of Assembly constituencies in Puducherry

The Puducherry Legislative Assembly is the unicameral legislature of the Indian union territory (UT) of Puducherry, which comprises four districts: Puducherry, Karaikal, Mahé and Yanam. The legislative assembly has 33 seats, of which 5 are reserved for candidates from scheduled castes and 3 members are nominated by the Government of India. 30 out of 33 Members are elected directly by the people on the basis of universal adult franchise.

== History ==
In terms of the provisions of the Government of Union Territories Act, 1963 the normal tenure of the Assembly is five years, unless sooner dissolved. There are 16 Committees in the Assembly.

Parliamentary and assembly constituencies of Puducherry were redesigned by Delimitation Commission of India based on data obtained in 2001 census of India. On 4 January 2008, the Cabinet Committee on Political Affairs (CCPA) decided to implement the order from the Delimitation Commission. In addition, three members can be nominated to the assembly by the central government.

=== After 1963 Delimitation ===
As per The Union Territories Act, 1963, thirty members would be elected through direct suffrage. Before the Elections to constitute the First Pondicherry Legislative Assembly were held in August 1964, the constituencies were delimited by the Delimitation Commission (as per Delimitation Commission Act, 1962) and the entire territory was divided into 30 single-member constituencies-21 for Pondicherry region, 6 for Karaikal region, 2 for Mahe region and 1 for Yanam region. Out of these 5 seats were reserved for Scheduled Castes, four in Pondicherry region and one in Karaikal region.

=== Before delimitation of 2008 ===
The Puducherry Legislative Assembly has 30 constituencies. Out of them 21 constituencies belong to Puducherry, Karaikal has 6 in number, Mahé has 2 in number and Yanam has a single constituency.

Puducherry was divided among these 21 assembly constituencies: Muthialpet, Cassicade, Raj Bhavan, Bussy, Oupalam, Orleampeth, Nellithope, Modeliarpeth, Ariankuppam, Embalom (SC), Nettapakkam, Kuruvinatham, Bahour (SC), Thirubuvanai (SC), Mannadipeth, Ossudu (SC), Villenour, Ozhukarai, Thattanchavady, Reddiarpalayam and Lawspet.

Area under Karaikal district was divided among the following 6 assembly constituencies: Cotchery, Karaikal, Karaikal South, Neravy-Grand Alde, Tirunallar and Neduncadu (SC).

Assembly constituencies of Mahé and Palloor were from Mahé district. The Yanam district formed a single assembly constituency, i.e. Yanam.

=== After delimitation of 2008 ===
Post delimitation, the Puducherry parliamentary constituencies is divided among 30 elected assembly constituencies, as before. Now, Yanam and Mahé districts form a single constituency each, viz Yanam and Mahé, respectively. The area under Karaikal district forms 5 assembly constituencies, viz Nedungadu, Thirunallar, Karaikal North, Karaikal South and Neravy T R Pattinam. The area under the Puducherry district forms 23 assembly constituencies, viz Mannadipet, Thirubuvanai, Ossudu, Mangalam, Villianur, Ozhukarai, Kadirkamam, Indira Nagar, Thattanchavady, Kamaraj Nagar, Lawspet, Kalapet, Muthialpet, Raj Bhavan, Oupalam, Orleampeth, Nellithope, Mudaliarpet, Ariankuppam, Manavely, Embalam, Nettapakkam and Bahour.

The constituencies of Thirubuvanai, Ossudu, Embalam, Nettapakkam and Nedungadu are reserved for candidates from SC.

== Constituencies ==
Map of PY Assembly constituencies

Constituency map

Following is the list of the constituencies of the Puducherry Legislative Assembly since the delimitation of legislative assembly constituencies in 2008. Out of the 30 elected constituencies, 23 belong to Puducherry, Karaikal has 5 constituencies, while Mahe and Yanam have a single constituency each. The constituencies of Thirubuvanai, Ossudu, Embalam, Nettapakkam and Nedungadu are reserved for candidates of the Scheduled Castes (SC).

Constituencies of the Puducherry Legislative Assembly
#	Name	Reservation	District	Lok Sabha constituency	Electors (2021)
1	Mannadipet	None	Puducherry	Puducherry	32,324
2	Thirubuvanai	SC	Puducherry	Puducherry	32,908
3	Ossudu	SC	Puducherry	Puducherry	32,176
4	Mangalam	None	Puducherry	Puducherry	38,004
5	Villianur	None	Puducherry	Puducherry	42,329
6	Ozhukarai	None	Puducherry	Puducherry	41,890
7	Kadirkamam	None	Puducherry	Puducherry	34,471
8	Indira Nagar	None	Puducherry	Puducherry	35,492
9	Thattanchavady	None	Puducherry	Puducherry	30,483
10	Kamaraj Nagar	None	Puducherry	Puducherry	37,491
11	Lawspet	None	Puducherry	Puducherry	32,359
12	Kalapet	None	Puducherry	Puducherry	34,547
13	Muthialpet	None	Puducherry	Puducherry	29,924
14	Raj Bhavan	None	Puducherry	Puducherry	26,349
15	Oupalam	None	Puducherry	Puducherry	27,913
16	Orleampeth	None	Puducherry	Puducherry	24,723
17	Nellithope	None	Puducherry	Puducherry	33,609
18	Mudaliarpet	None	Puducherry	Puducherry	35,597
19	Ariankuppam	None	Puducherry	Puducherry	39,001
20	Manavely	None	Puducherry	Puducherry	34,509
21	Embalam	SC	Puducherry	Puducherry	34,810
22	Nettapakkam	SC	Puducherry	Puducherry	32,707
23	Bahour	None	Puducherry	Puducherry	29,762
24	Nedungadu	SC	Karaikal	Puducherry	31,494
25	Thirunallar	None	Karaikal	Puducherry	31,204
26	Karaikal North	None	Karaikal	Puducherry	35,598
27	Karaikal South	None	Karaikal	Puducherry	31,891
28	Neravy T. R. Pattinam	None	Karaikal	Puducherry	31,277
29	Mahe	None	Mahe	Puducherry	31,092
30	Yanam	None	Yanam	Puducherry	37,747

== See also ==
- List of chief ministers of Puducherry
- List of speakers of the Puducherry Legislative Assembly
- List of nominated members of the Puducherry Legislative Assembly
