= 1st Pondicherry Assembly =

1st Assembly of Pondicherry
←	2nd Pondicherry Representative Assembly	2nd Assembly of Pondicherry	→

Overview
- Legislative body: Pondicherry Legislative Assembly
- Term: 1 July 1963 – 24 August 1964
- Election: 1959 Pondicherry Representative Assembly election
- Government: Indian National Congress
- Opposition: People's Front
- Members: 39

The Pondicherry Representative Assembly was converted into the Legislative Assembly on 1 July 1963 as per Section 54(3) of The Union Territories Act, 1963. All the 39 members who were elected by 1959 were deemed to have been elected to the First Assembly of Pondicherry Première Assemblée de Pondichéry (1 July 1963 – 24 August 1964).

== Background ==
The First Representative Assembly of Pondicherry which was constituted in 1955 after 1955 Pondicherry Representative Assembly election. However, that government was not stable as the ruling party was ridden with personal strifes and factions. The Government of India had to intervene finally by dissolving the Assembly following the instability caused by the change of party affiliation of members. Then, the Chief Commissioner took over the administration in October 1958. Later, after nine months, second general elections were held to the Pondicherry Representative Assembly in 1959.

== Important members ==
- Speaker:
  - A.S. Gangeyan from 22 July 1963 to 18 September 1964
- Deputy Speaker:
  - Kamichetty S.V. Rao Naidu from 27 November 1963 to 24 August 1964
- Chief minister:
  - Edouard Goubert from 1 July 1963 to 24 August 1964
- Leader of opposition:
  - V. Subbiah from 29 August 1964 – 19 September 1968

== Members of the 1st Pondicherry Representative Assembly ==
Party Name	Members
Congress	21
People's Front (P.F.)	13
PSP	1
Independents	4

Keys: Congress (21) People's Front (P.F.) (13) Praja Socialist Party (P.S.P.) (1) Independent (4)

Members of the 1st Pondicherry Representative Assembly
S. No	Name	Constituency	Region	Party
1	Kamichetty Savithri	Anakalapettai (Note: i.e. Kanakalapeta constituency)	Yanam	Ind.
2	K.S.V. Prasadarao Naidu	Andhrapettai (Note: i.e. Adi Andhrapeta constituency)	Yanam	Ind.
3	P.C. Purushottam Rettiar	Archivak–Tavalacoupom	Pondicherry	Congress
4	K.Ramanujam	Ariankuppam	Pondicherry	P.F.
5	K. Subrahmania Padayachi	Bahour	Pondicherry	Congress
6	M.M.Hussein	Bussy Street	Pondicherry	P.F.
7	Annamalai Naicker	Embaralam-Kalamandapam	Pondicherry	Congress
8	S. Somasundara Chettiar	Kalapet	Pondicherry	Congress
9	Mohamed Ismail Maricar	Karikal North	Karikal	Congress
10	K.E.M. Mohamed Ibrahim Maricar	Karikal Central	Karikal	Ind.
11	K.V. Prosper	Karikal South	Karikal	Congress
12	K.S.Govindaraj	Karaikovil Pathu	Karikal	Congress
13	Smt. Saraswathi Subbiah	Kasikaddai	Pondicherry	P.F.
14	P.C. Murugaswamy Clemenceau	Kurichikuppam	Pondicherry	P.F.
15	R.L. Purushottam Reddiar	Kuruvinattam-Kariambuttur	Pondicherry	Congress
16	V.Ramaswamy Pillai	Madhakovil	Karikal	Congress
17	C. E. Barathan	Mahe Town	Mahe	Congress
18	Édouard Goubert	Mannadipet	Pondicherry	Congress `
19	V.Subbaiah	Murungapakkam-Nainar Mandapam	Pondicherry	P.F.
20	P. Abraham	Muthialpet	Pondicherry	Congress
21	P. Shanmugam	Nedungadu	Karikal	Congress
22	N. Govindaraju	Nellitope Town	Pondicherry	P.F.
23	D. Rathinasabapathy Pillai	Neravy	Karikal	Congress
24	Venkatasubba Reddiar	Nettapakkam	Pondicherry	Congress
25	N. Guruswamy	Oulgaret	Pondicherry	P.F.
26	R. Vaithilingam	Ooppalaom	Pondicherry	P.F.
27	R. Pakir Mohammed	Oossetteri	Pondicherry	P.F.
28	C.T.Raman	Palloor	Mahe	P.S.P.
29	T.N.Purushottama	Panthakkal	Mahe	Congress
30	A. S. Gangeyan	Rajbhavan	Pondicherry	Congress
31	V.Narayanaswamy	Reddiarpalayam Town	Pondicherry	P.F.
32	P.Narayana Swamy	Saram and Lawspet	Pondicherry	P.F.
33	S. Natarajan	Sellipet-Souttoukeny	Pondicherry	P.F.
34	K. M. Guruswamy Pillai	Thirumeni Alagar	Karikal	Congress
35	V. M. C. Varada Pillai	Thirumalayapattinam North	Karikal	Congress
36	Nagamuthu Pillai	Thirumalarayanpattinam South	Karikal	Congress
37	Subbarayulu Naicker	Tirunalar-Badrakaliamman Kovil	Karikal	Congress
38	Soundarassamy	Tirunalar-Darbaranyeswarar Koil	Karikal	Ind.
39	M. Chidambaram	Villenour	Pondicherry	P.F.

== See also ==
- Government of Puducherry
- List of chief ministers of Puducherry
- List of lieutenant governors of Puducherry
- Puducherry Legislative Assembly
- Pondicherry Representative Assembly
- 1959 Pondicherry Representative Assembly election
