= 1959 Pondicherry Representative Assembly election =

Indian union territory election

- 11 August 1959

All 39 seats to the Puducherry Representative Assembly 20 seats needed for a majority
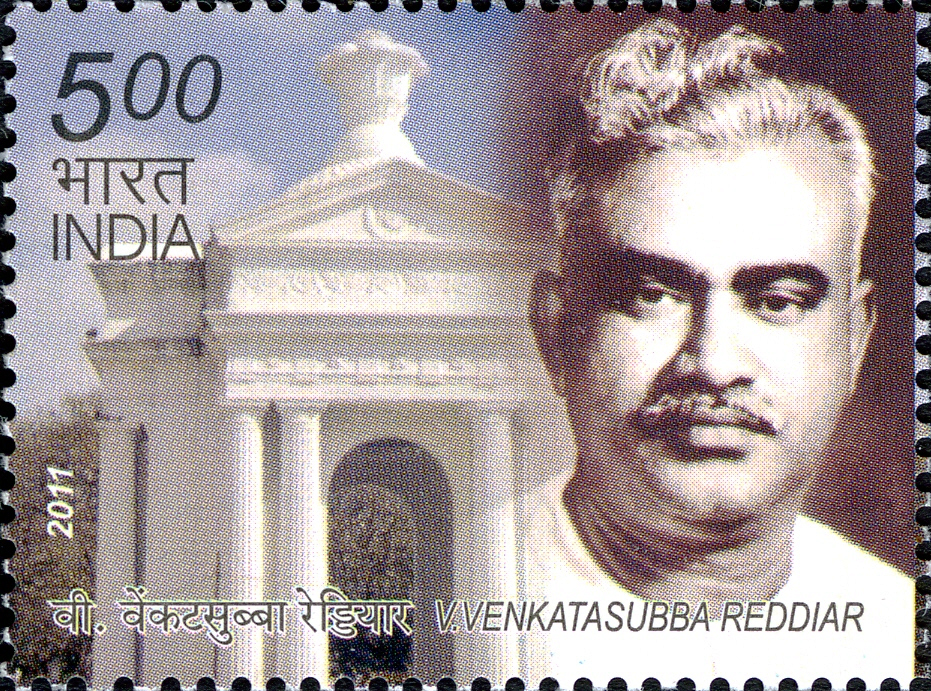

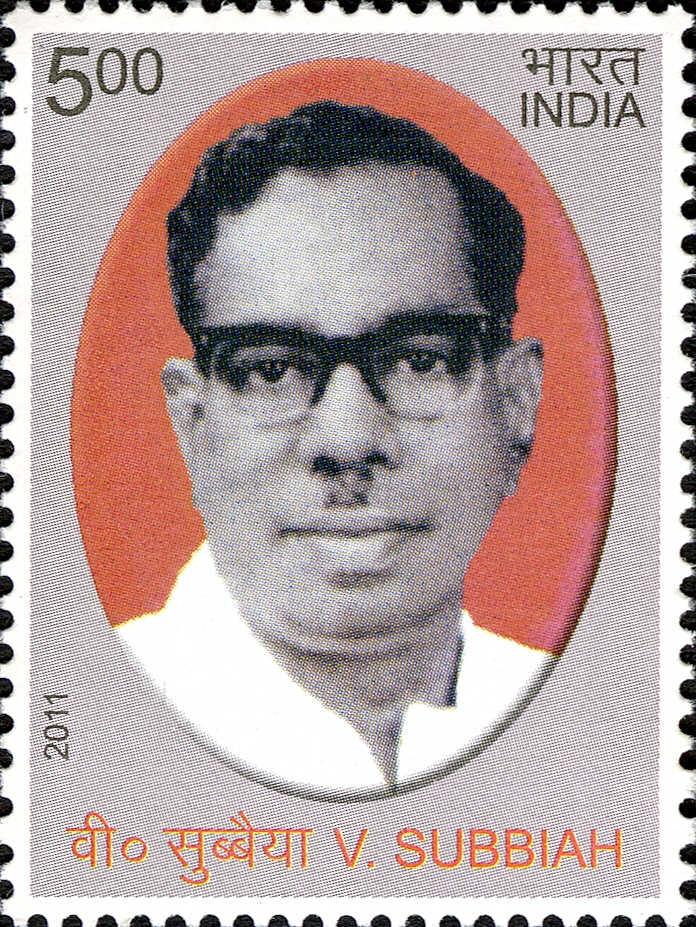
	First party	Second party
Leader	V. Venkatasubba Reddiar	V. Subbiah
Party	Indian National Congress	People's Front
Leader's seat	Nettapakkam	Murungapakkam-Nainar Mandapam
Last election	20	16
Seats before	22	12
Seats won	21	13
Seat change	▼1	▲1
Percentage	38.4%	31.6%
Chief Minister before election
Édouard Goubert
Indian National Congress
Elected Chief Minister
V. Venkatasubba Reddiar
Indian National Congress

After the de facto merger on 1 November 1954 and before the legal integration with the Indian Union on 16 August 1962, second general elections were held in August 1959 to constitute Second Pondicherry Representative Assembly.

== Background ==
the Congress, with the support of independents, was able to form a Government after first elections in 1955. However, that government was not stable as the ruling party was ridden with personal strife and factions. The Government of India had to intervene finally by dissolving the Assembly and the Chief Commissioner took over the administration in October 1958. Later, after nine months, second general elections were held to the Pondicherry Representative Assembly in 1959 from 11 to 14 August.

== Results ==
The results of 1959 election were summarized below:

Parties and Coalitions	Won	Votes	Vote %	Change
Indian National Congress	21	60,636	38.4	▼1
People's Front (Note: Thirty-four Communist candidates stood under the banner of the People's Front.)	13	49,505	31.6	▲1
Independents and others (Note: i.e. Praja Socialist Party)	5	47,162	30	Steady
TOTAL	39	1,57,030	100	N.A.

Another reference with some change in voteshare were summarized below:

Parties and Coalitions	Won	Votes	Vote %	Change
Indian National Congress	21	64,000	41.1	▼1
People's Front (Note: Thirty-four Communist candidates stood under the banner of the People's Front.)	13	53,800	34.3	▲1
Independents and others (Note: i.e. Praja Socialist Party)	5	38,600	24.6	Steady
TOTAL	39	1,57,000	100	N.A.

However, during 1963, the state of parties in the Representative Assembly was: Congress, 24; People's Front (Makkaḷ Munnaṇi (Tamil:மக்கள் முன்னணி)), 12; Praja Socialist Party, 1; Independents, 2.

== Members of the 1959 Pondicherry Representative Assembly ==
Members of the 1959 Pondicherry Representative Assembly
S. No	Name	Constituency	Region	Party
1	Kamisetty Savithri	Anakalapettai (Note: i.e. Kanakalapeta constituency)	Yanam	Ind. (Note: i.e. Independent)
2	Kamisetty Parasuram Naidu	Andhrapettai (Note: i.e. Adi Andhrapeta constituency)	Yanam	Ind.
3	P.C. Purushottam Rettiar	Archivak–Tavalacoupom	Pondicherry	Congress
4	K.Ramanujam	Ariankuppam	Pondicherry	P.F. (Note: i.e. People's Front)
5	K. Subrahmania Padayachi	Bahour	Pondicherry	Congress
6	M.M.Hussein	Bussy Street	Pondicherry	P.F.
7	Annamalai Naicker	Embaralam-Kalamandapam	Pondicherry	Congress
8	S. Somasundara Chettiar	Kalapet	Pondicherry	Congress
9	Mohamed Ismail Maricar	Karikal North	Karikal	Congress
10	K.E.M. Mohamed Ibrahim Maricar	Karikal Central	Karikal	Ind.
11	K.V. Prosper	Karikal South	Karikal	Congress
12	K.S.Govindaraj	Karaikovil Pathu	Karikal	Congress
13	Smt. Saraswathi Subbiah	Kasikaddai	Pondicherry	P.F.
14	P.C. Murugaswamy Clemenceau	Kurichikuppam	Pondicherry	P.F.
15	R.L. Purushottam Reddiar	Kuruvinattam-Kariambuttur	Pondicherry	Congress
16	V.Ramaswamy Pillai	Madhakovil	Karikal	Congress
17	C. E. Barathan	Mahe Town	Mahe	Congress
18	Édouard Goubert	Mannadipet	Pondicherry	Congress `
19	V.Subbaiah	Murungapakkam-Nainar Mandapam	Pondicherry	P.F.
20	P. Abraham	Muthialpet	Pondicherry	Congress
21	P. Shanmugam	Nedungadu	Karikal	Congress
22	N. Govindaraju	Nellitope Town	Pondicherry	P.F.
23	D. Rathinasabapathy Pillai	Neravy	Karikal	Congress
24	Venkatasubba Reddiar	Nettapakkam	Pondicherry	Congress
25	N. Guruswamy	Oulgaret	Pondicherry	P.F.
26	R. Vaithilingam	Ooppalaom	Pondicherry	P.F.
27	R. Pakir Mohammed	Oossetteri	Pondicherry	P.F.
28	P.K.Raman	Palloor	Mahe	P.S.P.
29	V.N.Purushottama	Panthakkal	Mahe	Congress
30	A. S. Gangeyan	Rajbhavan	Pondicherry	Congress
31	V.Narayanaswamy	Reddiarpalayam Town	Pondicherry	P.F.
32	P.Narayana Swamy	Saram and Lawspet	Pondicherry	P.F.
33	S. Natarajan	Sellipet-Souttoukeny	Pondicherry	P.F.
34	K. M. Guruswamy Pillai	Thirumeni Alagar	Karikal	Congress
35	V. M. C. Varada Pillai	Thirumalayapattinam North	Karikal	Congress
36	Nagamuthu Pillai	Thirumalarayanpattinam South	Karikal	Congress
37	Subbarayulu Naicker	Tirunalar-Badrakaliamman Kovil	Karikal	Congress
38	Soundarassamy	Tirunalar-Darbaranyeswarar Koil	Karikal	Ind.
39	M. Chidambaram	Villenour	Pondicherry	P.F.

== Council of ministers of Reddiar (1959-1963) ==
Under supervision of then chief commissioner L.R.S Singh a Council of ministers was formed under leadership of V. Venkatasubba Reddiar: on 9 September 1959. President of the assembly that is equivalent to speaker was A. S. Gangeyan.

Minister	Portfolio
V. Venkatasubba Reddiar; Chief minister	Public Works, Electrical, Fisheries and Port
Édouard Goubert	Finance, Labour and Industries
C. E. Barathan	Local Administration, Education and Transport
Gouroussamy Pillai; Revenue minister	Revenue, Veterinary and Information
P. Shanmugam; Agriculture minister	Agriculture, Rural Development and Harijan Welfare
Mohamed Ismail Maricar; Health minister	Health, Hygiene and Co-operation

== Council of ministers of Goubert (1963-1964) ==
The French settlements of India were de jure transferred on 16 August 1962. Pondicherry Representative Assembly functioned until June 30, 1963, and succeeded by Puducherry Legislative Assembly. The Indian Parliament enacted the Government of Union Territories Act, 1963 that came into force on 1 July 1963, and the pattern of Government prevailing in the rest of the country was introduced in this territory also, but subject to certain limitations. Edouard Goubert became the chief minister in the subsequent Pondicherry Legislative Assembly.

In the First Legislative Assembly of Pondicherry, under supervision of then chief commissioner S.K. Datta a Council of ministers was formed under leadership of Édouard Goubert: on 1 July 1963. Speaker was A. S. Gangeyan.

Minister	Portfolio
Édouard Goubert; Chief Minister	Confidential and Cabinet Department, Home Department, Appointments Department, General Administration Department (except Information, Publicity and Government Press,) Education Department, Legislative and Judicial Department, Industries Department, Finance Department and any other business not allocated to any other Minister
V. Venkatasubba Reddiar; Development minister	Five Year Plans-Planning, Implementation and Evaluation, Public Works Department, Electricity, Fisheries, Port, Government Press and Statistics
Gouroussamy Pillai; Revenue minister	Revenue Department, Animal Husbandry, Information and Publicity Department
Mohamed Ismail Maricar; Health minister	Medical and Public Health Department, Co-operation and Town Planning
M.K.Zeevaratnam	Local Administration Department, Labour Department, Social, Child and Women's Welfare
V.M.C. Varada Pillay Agriculture minister	Agriculture, Community Development and Local Development Works

== Trivia ==
In Yanam, for Kanakalapeta constituency, two independents (Note: Kamichetty Savithri and Yerra Jagannadha Rao) secured exactly 707 votes each and so to decide the winner, lots were cast. Finally, Kamichetty Savithri was declared winner. (Note: There was a rumour that on both of lots the name of Kamichetty Savithri was written. Thus ensuring her victory.) In the same constituency, Congress candidate polled only 8 votes.

== See also ==
- Puducherry Legislative Assembly
- 1946 French India Representative Assembly election
- 1951 French India Representative Assembly election
- 1955 Pondicherry Representative Assembly election
- Elections in Puducherry
