= A. M. H. Nazeem =

Indian politician

Leader of the Opposition in Puducherry Legislative Assembly
- Incumbent
- Assumed office 20 May 2026
- Lieutenant Governor: Kuniyil Kailashnathan
- Preceded by: R. Siva
- Constituency: Karaikal South

Member of the Puducherry Legislative Assembly
- Incumbent
- Assumed office 8 May 2021
- Preceded by: K. A. U. Asana
- Constituency: Karaikal South

Personal details
- Party: Dravida Munnetra Kazhagam

A. M. Hameed Nazeem is the Member of the Legislative Assembly for the Karaikal South constituency and a former health minister and opposition leader of Puducherry union territory in India.

== Personal information ==
He is the son of Hameed Maraicaiar. His age is 59. He is a member of Dravida Munnetra Kazhagam (DMK).

== Career ==
Nazeem's political career started in the year 1983. In 1990, he was elected to the Puducherry Assembly from Karaikal North in 1991, 1996, 2001 and 2006. In 1996, when DMK was in power, he became the health minister. In 2006, he was the opposition leader. In 2011, Nazeem once again became MLA, contesting in the newly created Karaikal South constituency, defeating V.K.Ganapathy by nearly 1500 votes. He was defeated by K. A. U. Asana in the 2016 election by 20 votes, after many alliance party workers worked against him. In 2021 elections, Nazeem defeated his rival K.A.U. Asana, by scoring 71.15% votes.

== Developments in Karaikal under his career ==
Nazeem is the MLA who helped with the re-construction of Chandra Theertham temple tank. He is responsible for the festival of theppam in the Chandra Theertham temple tank after 30 years. He helped to construct and celebrate the Karaikal chariot festival. He also played a prominent role in getting JIPMER's branch in Karaikal, NIT and construction of the fishing harbour.

== Electoral History ==
Year	Constituency	Party	Votes	%	Opponent	Party	Votes	%	Result	Margin	%
2026	Karaikal South	DMK	12,543	49.15	Avs Sakthivel Prabu	INC	6,681	26.18	Won	▲5,862	▲22.97
2021	Karaikal South	DMK	17,401	71.15	K.A.U. Assana Marecar	ADMK	5,367	21.95	Won	▲12,034	▲49.20
2016	Karaikal South	DMK	11,084	46.57	K.A.U. Asana	ADMK	11,104	46.66	Lost	▼20	▼0.09
2011	Karaikal South	DMK	8,377	39.37	V.K. Ganapathy	IND	6,801	31.96	Won	▲1,576	▲7.41
2006	Karaikal	DMK	5,742	45.20	A. J. Assana	DMDK	5,551	43.70	Won	▲191	▲1.50
2001	Karaikal	DMK	6,273	46.92	A. J. Assana	ADMK	3,969	29.69	Won	▲2,304	▲17.23
1996	Karaikal	DMK	9,474	71.01	H.M. Abdul Kader	ADMK	2,946	22.08	Won	▲6,528	▲48.93
1991	Karaikal	DMK	6,809	59.31	M. Gnanadesigan	ADMK	4,389	38.23	Won	▲2,420	▲21.08
