= E. Mohandoss =

Indian politician

Member of the Puducherry Legislative Assembly
- Incumbent
- Assumed office 2026
- Preceded by: M. Kandasamy
- Constituency: Embalam (SC)

Personal details
- Party: All India N.R. Congress
- Profession: Politician

E. Mohandoss is an Indian politician from Puducherry. He is a member of the Puducherry Legislative Assembly from Embalam (SC) representing the All India N.R. Congress.

== Political career ==
Mohandoss won the Embalam (SC) seat in the 2026 Puducherry Legislative Assembly election as a candidate of the All India N.R. Congress. He received 16,017 votes and defeated M. Kandaswamy of the Indian National Congress by a margin of 4,061 votes.
