= Puducherry Munnetra Congress =

- Leader: P. Kannan
- Founder: P. Kannan
- Founded: 11 May 2005
- Dissolved: 2009
- Merger of: Indian National Congress
- Preceded by: Puducherry Makkal Congress
- Succeeded by: Makkal Munnetra Congress
- Alliance: AIADMK+ (2006)
- Seats in Rajya Sabha: 0 / 245
- Seats in Lok Sabha: 0 / 543
- Seats in: 0 / 33

Election symbol
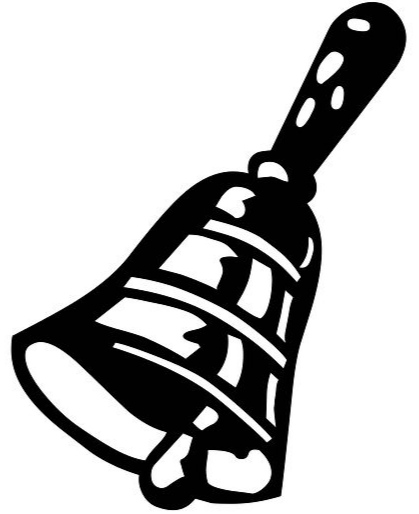

The Puducherry Munnetra Congress, formerly known as the Pondicherry Munnetra Congress, (PMC) was a political party in India active in the Union Territory of Puducherry. It was formed by former speaker, former member of parliament P. Kannan on 11 May 2005. Its symbol is the bell.

The party holds 3 seats in the Puducherry Legislative Assembly which they won during the 2006 elections with All India Anna Dravida Munnetra Kazhagam (AIADMK) as its ally.

During the general election of 2009, the party switched camps and now supports the Indian National Congress. In 25 September 2019 he floated a new political party – Makkal Munnetra Congress (MMC), later joined BJP in 2021 and resigned & deceased in 2023.

== See also ==
- Indian National Congress breakaway parties
