= A. K. Sai J. Saravanan Kumar =

Indian politician

Minister of Civil Supplies & Consumer Affairs DRDA, Community Development, Urban Basic Services, fire Services, minority Affairs Government of Puducherry
- In office 27 June 2021 – 28 June 2025
- Chief Minister: N. Rangaswamy
- Preceded by: V. Narayanasamy
- Succeeded by: A. Johnkumar

Member of Puducherry Legislative Assembly
- Incumbent
- Assumed office 2 May 2021
- Chief Minister: N. Rangaswamy
- Preceded by: Malladi Krishna Rao
- Constituency: Ossudu

Personal details
- Party: Tamilaga Vettri Kazhagam
- Other political affiliations: Bharatiya Janata Party

A. K. Sai J. Saravanan Kumar is an Indian politician. He was elected to the Puducherry Legislative Assembly from Ossudu as a member of the Bharatiya Janata Party. He also served as a cabinet minister in Puducherry government from 2021 to 2025.
