= Puducherry Legislative Assembly =

Unicameral legislature of the Indian union territory of Puducherry

- 16th Puducherry Assembly
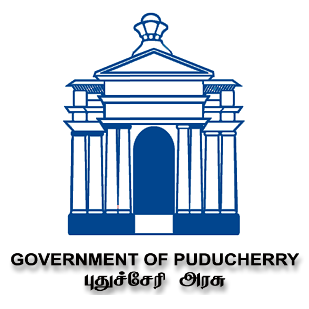

Type
- Type: Unicameral
- Term limits: 5 years

History
- Founded: 10 May 1965 (61 years ago)

Leadership
- Lieutenant Governor: K. Kailashnathan since 7 August 2024
- Speaker: A. Anbalagan, AIADMK
- Leader of the House (Chief Minister): N. Rangaswamy, AINRC
- Leader of the Opposition: A. M. H. Nazeem, DMK

Structure
- Seats: 33 (Note: 30 directly elected members and 3 appointed members by the Government of India.)
- Political groups: Government (22) NDA (22): AINRC (12); BJP (7) (Note: 3 appointed by governor.); AIADMK (1); LJK (1); IND (1); Opposition (5): DMK (5); SSJVA (4): TVK (2); NMK (1); INC (1); Other (2): IND (2)

Elections
- Voting system: 30 seats elected via First past the post; 3 seats nominated by the Lieutenant Governor
- First election: 11 August 1959
- Last election: 9 April 2026
- Next election: 2031

Meeting place
- Chief Secretariat of Puducherry, Puducherry, Puducherry

Website
- www.py.gov.in

The Puducherry Legislative Assembly is the unicameral legislature of the Indian union territory (UT) of Puducherry, which comprises four districts: Puducherry, Karaikal, Mahé and Yanam. Out of eight union territories of India, only three have legislatures and they are Delhi (Note: Delhi Assembly existed between 1952 and 1956 as a part C state and re-established in 1993.), Puducherry (Note: Puducherry Assembly exist since 1962.) and Jammu and Kashmir (Note: was a state until 2019.). After delimitation shortly after its formation, the Puducherry legislative assembly has 33 seats, of which 3 members are nominated by the Government of India and 30 members are elected directly by the people based on universal adult franchise . The nominated members enjoy the same powers as elected members of the assembly. 5 seats out of 30 directly contested seats are reserved for candidates from scheduled castes.

Pondicherry Assembly seats

Geographically, the area under the Puducherry UT consists of three disjointed regions, with Puducherry and Karaikal districts surrounded by districts of Tamil Nadu, Yanam district an enclave of East Godavari district of Andhra Pradesh, and Mahé district bordered by districts of Kerala. The four districts were ruled by the French before they were integrated into India in 1962. For ease of administration, during French rule, the area under these four districts was divided into 39 assembly constituencies. After becoming a UT of India, Puducherry was divided into 30 assembly constituencies, which were restructured in 2005 by the Delimitation Commission of India.

== History ==
=== Assembly during French rule ===
In 1946, French India (Inde française) became Overseas territory (Territoire d'outre-mer) of France. Then a Representative Assembly (Assemblée représentative) was created. Thus, in 1946, on 25 October, the representative assembly of 44 members has replaced the general council (conseil général). The Representative Assembly had 44 seats until merger of Chandernagore in 1951. Later, it reduced to 39 seats.

=== Merger and formation of Union Territory ===
The French government transferred the four enclaves to the Indian Union under a de facto treaty on 1 November 1954. Later the territory was merged with India on 16 August 1962.

On 10 May 1963, the Indian Parliament enacted the Government of Union Territories Act, 1963 that came into force on 1 July 1963. This introduced the same pattern of government that prevailed in the rest of the country, but subject to certain limitations. Under Article 239 of the Indian Constitution, the President of India appoints an Administrator LG with such designation as he may specify to head the administration of the territory. The President also appoints the Chief Minister. The President, on the advice of the Chief Minister, appoints the other Ministers. The Union Territories Act, 1963 limits the number of elected members of the assembly to 30 and allows the central government to appoint not more than 3 nominated MLAs. The same act ensures that seats are reserved for Scheduled Castes in the legislative assembly.

The Representative Assembly was converted into the Legislative Assembly of Pondicherry on 1 July 1963 as per Section 54(3) of The Union Territories Act, 1963 and its members were deemed to have been elected to the Assembly. Thus, the First Legislative Assembly was formed without an election. Elections for the assembly have been held since 1964.

== Languages ==
Puducherry has five official names, owing to its linguistic diversity, past French heritage, and the legacy of British India. The legislative assembly is referred to as follows:

- English: Puducherry Legislative Assembly
- French: Assemblée législative de Poudouchéry
- Tamil: புதுச்சேரி சட்டப் பேரவை, romanized: Puduccēri Caṭṭap Pēravai
- Telugu: పుదుచ్చేరి శాసనసభ, romanized: Puduccēri Śāsanasabha
- Malayalam: പുതുച്ചേരി നിയമസഭ, romanized: Puduccēri Niyamasabha

== List of the assemblies ==
Assembly (Election)	Ruling Party	Chief Minister	Speaker	Deputy Speaker	Leader of the House	Leader of the Opposition
1st (1959)	Indian National Congress	Edouard Goubert	A. S. Gangeyan	Kamisetty Parasuram Naidu	Edouard Goubert	V. Subbiah
2nd (1964)	Indian National Congress	V. Venkatasubba Reddiar M. O. H. Farook V. Venkatasubba Reddiar	M. O. H. Farook P. Shanmugam S. Manicka Vasagam	V. N. Purushothaman	V. Venkatasubba Reddiar M. O. H. Farook V. Venkatasubba Reddiar	V. Subbiah
3rd (1969)	Dravida Munnetra Kazhagam	M. O. H. Farook	S. Perumal M. L. Selvaradjou	M. L. Selvaradjou Kamisetty Parasuram Naidu	M. O. H. Farook	P. Shanmugam
4th (1974)	All India Anna Dravida Munnetra Kazhagam	S. Ramassamy	S. Pakkiam	Vacant	S. Ramassamy	Dana Kantharaj
5th (1977)	All India Anna Dravida Munnetra Kazhagam	S. Ramassamy	K. Kanthi	S. Pazhaninathan	S. Ramassamy	P. Ansari Doraisamy
6th (1980)	Dravida Munnetra Kazhagam	M. D. R. Ramachandran	M. O. H. Farook	L. Joseph Mariadoss	M. D. R. Ramachandran	P. Uthiravelu
7th (1985)	Indian National Congress	M. O. H. Farook	Kamisetty Parasuram Naidu M. Chandirakasu	M. Chandirakasu P. K. Sathianandan	M. O. H. Farook	P. K. Loganathan
8th (1990)	Dravida Munnetra Kazhagam	M. D. R. Ramachandran	G. Palaniraja	A. Bhakthavatsalam	M. D. R. Ramachandran	M. O. H. Farook
9th (1991)	Indian National Congress	V. Vaithilingam	P. Kannan	A. V. Subramanian	V. Vaithilingam	V. M. C. V. Ganapathy
10th (1996)	Dravida Munnetra Kazhagam	R. V. Janakiraman	V. M. C. Sivakumar M. Kandasamy	V. Nagarathinam M. Kandasamy	R. V. Janakiraman	V. Vaithilingam
10th (1996)	Indian National Congress	P. Shanmugam	A. V. Subramanian	K. Rajasekaran	P. Shanmugam	R. V. Janakiraman
11th (2001)	Indian National Congress	P. Shanmugam N. Rangasamy	M. D. R. Ramachandran	M. Chandirakasu A. V. Subramanian	P. Shanmugam N. Rangasamy	R. V. Janakiraman
12th (2006)	Indian National Congress	N. Rangasamy V. Vaithilingam	R. Radhakrishnan	A. V. Sreedharan	N. Rangasamy V. Vaithilingam	A. M. H. Nazeem
13th (2011)	All India N.R. Congress	N. Rangasamy	V. Sabapathy	T. P. R. Selvame	N. Rangasamy	V. Vaithilingam
14th (2016)	Indian National Congress	V. Narayanasamy	V. Vaithilingam V. P. Sivakolundhu	V. P. Sivakolundhu M. N. R. Balan	V. Narayanasamy	N. Rangasamy
15th (2021)	All India N.R. Congress	N. Rangasamy	Embalam R. Selvam	P. Rajavelu	N. Rangasamy	R. Siva
16th (2026)	All India N.R. Congress	N. Rangasamy	TBA	TBA	N. Rangasamy	A. M. H. Nazeem

== Members of the Legislative Assembly ==
AINRC (12) DMK (5) BJP (4) IND (3) TVK (2) AIADMK (1) INC (1) LJK (1) NMK (1)
District	Constituency			Elected member	Political party	Alliance	Remarks
District	No.	Name	Reservation	Elected member	Political party	Alliance	Remarks
Puducherry	1	Mannadipet	General	A. Namassivayam	BJP	NDA	Minister for Home
Puducherry	2	Thirubhuvanai	SC	A. K. Sai J. Saravanan Kumar	TVK	SSJVA	
Puducherry	3	Oussudu	SC	P. Karthikeyan	INC	SSJVA	
Puducherry	4	Mangalam	General	N. Rangasamy	AINRC	NDA	Chief Minister
Puducherry	5	Villianur	General	B. Ravicoumar	AINRC	NDA	
Puducherry	6	Ozhukarai	General	K. Narayanasamy Alias Nithyanandam	AINRC	NDA	
Puducherry	7	Kadirgamam	General	Azhagu Alias Azhaganantham	IND	None	
Puducherry	8	Indira Nagar	General	P. V. Aroumougame Alias AKD	AINRC	NDA	
Puducherry	9	Thattanchavady	General	Ashok Anand	AINRC	NDA	
Puducherry	10	Kamaraj Nagar	General	Jose Charles Martin	LJK	NDA	
Puducherry	11	Lawspet	General	V. P. Sivakolundhu	AINRC	NDA	Minister for Civil Supplies and Consumer Affairs
Puducherry	12	Kalapet	General	Senthil Alias Ramesh	DMK	SPA	
Puducherry	13	Muthialpet	General	Vaiyapuri Manikandan	AINRC	NDA	
Puducherry	14	Raj Bhavan	General	Vignesh Kannan	DMK	SPA	
Puducherry	15	Oupalam	General	A. Anbalagan	AIADMK	NDA	
Puducherry	16	Orleampeth	General	G. Nehru Alias Couppoussamy	NMK	SSJVA	
Puducherry	17	Nellithope	General	V. Cartigueyane	DMK	SPA	
Puducherry	18	Mudaliarpet	General	A. Johnkumar	BJP	NDA	
Puducherry	19	Ariankuppam	General	C. Aiyappan Alias Mouttayappan	AINRC	NDA	
Puducherry	20	Manavely	General	B. Ramu	TVK	SSJVA	
Puducherry	21	Embalam	SC	E. Mohandoss	AINRC	NDA	
Puducherry	22	Nettapakkam	SC	P. Rajavelu	AINRC	NDA	Minister for Adi Dravidar Welfare
Puducherry	23	Bahour	General	R. Senthilkumar	DMK	SPA	
Karaikal	24	Nedungadu	SC	V. Vigneswaran	IND	NDA	
Karaikal	25	Thirunallar	General	G. N. S. Rajasekaran	BJP	NDA	Minister for Agriculture
Karaikal	26	Karaikal North	General	P. R. N. Thirumurugan	AINRC	NDA	
Karaikal	27	Karaikal South	General	A. M. H. Nazeem	DMK	SPA	Leader of the Opposition
Karaikal	28	Neravy – T. R. Pattinam	General	T. K. S. M. Meenatchisundaram	BJP	NDA	
Mahe	29	Mahe	General	T. Ashok Kumar	IND	None	
Yanam	30	Yanam	General	Malladi Krishna Rao	AINRC	NDA	Minister for Public Works

== Party position ==
Number of members of legislative assembly by party-wise and their floor leaders (As on 5 November 2026):

Alliance	Political party	No. of MLAs	Floor leader of the party
Government; NDA; Seats: 22	All India N. R. Congress	12	N. Rangasamy (Leader of the House)
Government; NDA; Seats: 22	Bharatiya Janata Party	4	A. Namassivayam
Government; NDA; Seats: 22	All India Anna Dravida Munnetra Kazhagam	1	A. Anbalagan
Government; NDA; Seats: 22	Latchiya Jananayaka Katchi	1	Jose Charles Martin
Government; NDA; Seats: 22	Independent	1	Steady
Government; NDA; Seats: 22	Nominated	3	Steady
Opposition; SPA; Seats: 5	Dravida Munnetra Kazhagam	5	A. M. H. Nazeem (Leader of the Opposition)
Others; Seats: 6	Tamilaga Vettri Kazhagam	2	A. K. Sai J. Saravanan Kumar
Others; Seats: 6	Indian National Congress	1	P. Karthikeyan
Others; Seats: 6	Neyam Makkal Kazhagam	1	G. Nehru Alias Couppoussamy
Others; Seats: 6	Independent	2	Steady
Total		33	

== See also ==
- Yanam Municipal Council
- Chief Minister of Puducherry
- Puducherry Municipal Council
- Lieutenant Governor of Puducherry
- Puducherry Lok Sabha constituency
- List of Rajya Sabha members from Puducherry
- List of speakers of the Puducherry Legislative Assembly
- List of constituencies of Puducherry Legislative Assembly
- List of leaders of the opposition in the Puducherry Legislative Assembly
