= Azhaganantham =

Indian politician

Member of the Puducherry Legislative Assembly
- Incumbent
- Assumed office 2026
- Preceded by: N. S. J. Jayabal
- Constituency: Kadirkamam

Personal details
- Party: Independent
- Profession: Politician

Azhaganantham is an Indian politician serving as a Member of the Puducherry Legislative Assembly from the Kadirkamam constituency. He was elected as an independent candidate in the 2026 Puducherry Legislative Assembly election.
