= Karaikal North Assembly constituency =

Constituency of the Puducherry legislative assembly in India

Coordinates: 10.938°N 79.836°E

Karaikal North
- Constituency No. 26 for the Puducherry Legislative Assembly
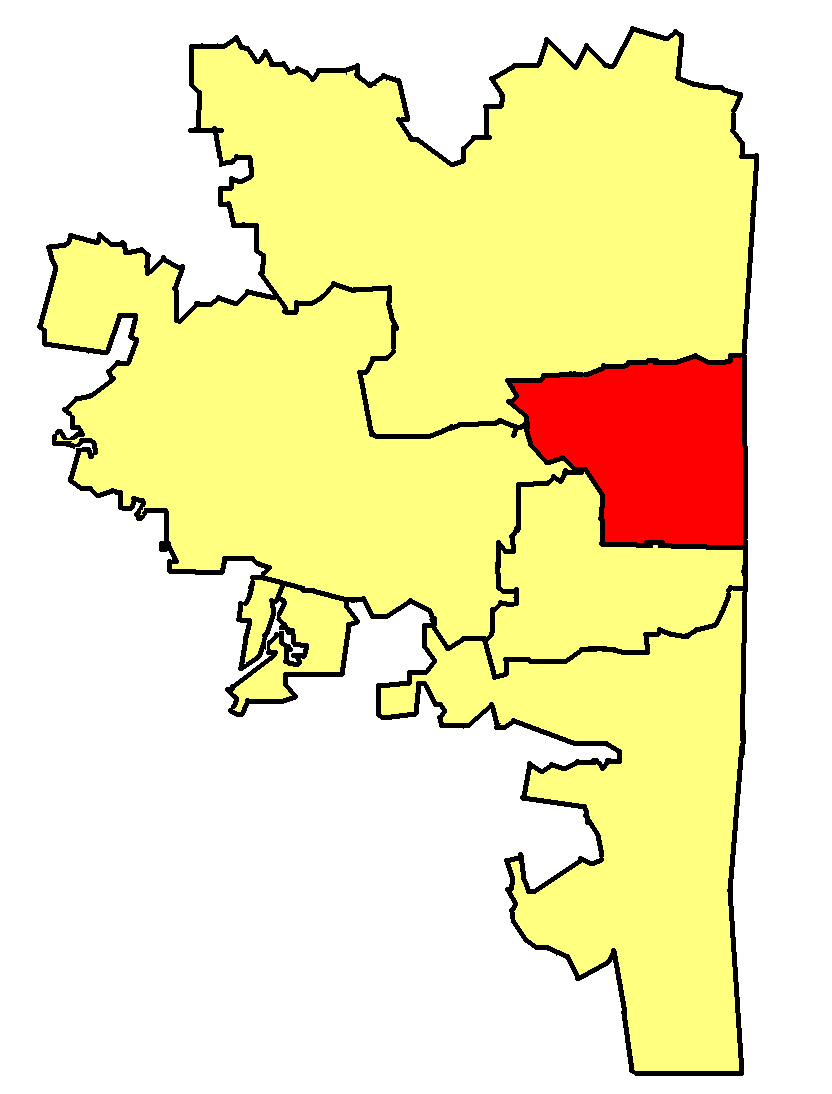

Constituency details
- Country: India
- Region: South India
- Union Territory: Puducherry
- District: Karaikal
- Lok Sabha constituency: Puducherry
- Established: 1964
- Total electors: 35,598
- Reservation: None

Member of Legislative Assembly
- 16th Puducherry Legislative Assembly
- Incumbent P. R. N. Thirumurugan
- Party: AINRC
- Alliance: NDA
- Elected year: 2021

Karaikal North is a legislative assembly constituency in the Union territory of Puducherry in India. Karaikal North Assembly constituency is part of Puducherry Lok Sabha constituency.

== Members of the Legislative Assembly ==
| Election | Member | Party |
|---|---|---|
| 1964 | Farook Maricar | Indian National Congress |
| 1969 | M. Jambulingam | Indian National Congress |
| 1974 | K. Kandhi | All India Anna Dravida Munnetra Kazhagam |
| 1977 | K. Kandhi | Independent politician |
| 1980 | V. M. Salih Maricar | Independent politician |
| 1985 | V. Govindarajan | Indian National Congress |
| 1990 | S. M. Thavasu | Indian National Congress |
| 1991 | A. M. H. Nazeem | Dravida Munnetra Kazhagam |
| 1996 | A. M. H. Nazeem | Dravida Munnetra Kazhagam |
| 2001 | A. M. H. Nazeem | Dravida Munnetra Kazhagam |
| 2006 | A. M. H. Nazeem | Dravida Munnetra Kazhagam |
| 2011 | P. R. N. Thirumurugan | Indian National Congress |
| 2016 | P. R. N. Thirumurugan | All India N.R. Congress |
| 2021 | P. R. N. Thirumurugan | All India N.R. Congress |
| 2026 | P. R. N. Thirumurugan | All India N.R. Congress |

== Election results ==
Vote share of winning candidates
| 2021 | 44.85% |
| 2016 | 49.34% |
| 2011 | 55.69% |
| 2006 | 45.20% |
| 2001 | 46.92% |
| 1996 | 71.01% |
| 1991 | 59.31% |
| 1990 | 41.51% |
| 1985 | 49.54% |
| 1980 | 55.25% |
| 1977 | 42.84% |
| 1974 | 41.24% |
| 1969 | 52.07% |
| 1964 | 56.39% |

=== Assembly Election 2026 ===
2026 Puducherry Legislative Assembly election: Karaikal (North)
| Party | Candidate | Votes | % | ±% |
|---|---|---|---|---|
| AINRC | P. R. N. Thirumurugan | 12,731 | 43.59 | ▼1.26 |
| INC | A. M. Ranjith | 10,078 | 34.50 | ▼9.88 |
| TVK | A. Venkatesh | 5,033 | 17.23 | New |
| Independent | Muruganandam | 516 | 1.77 | |
| NOTA | NOTA | 182 | 0.62 | ▼0.38 |
| Margin of victory | | 2,653 | 9.09 | ▲8.61 |
| Turnout | | 29,208 | | |
| Rejected ballots | | | | |
| Registered electors | | 33,241 | | |
| AINRC hold | | Swing | | |

=== Assembly Election 2021 ===
2021 Puducherry Legislative Assembly election: Karaikal North
| Party | Candidate | Votes | % | ±% |
|---|---|---|---|---|
| AINRC | P. R. N. Thirumurugan | 12,704 | 44.85 | |
| INC | A. V. Subramanian | 12,569 | 44.38 | 36.38 |
| Independent | A. Vengadesh | 766 | 2.70 | |
| MNM | K. Suresh | 359 | 1.27 | |
| NOTA | Nota | 282 | 1.00 | −0.54 |
| SDPI | Mohamed Thameem Kani | 185 | 0.65 | |
| Margin of victory | | 135 | 0.48 | −11.91 |
| Turnout | | 28,324 | 79.43 | −2.09 |
| Registered electors | | 35,661 | | 9.17 |
| AINRC hold | | Swing | -4.49 | |

=== Assembly Election 2016 ===
2016 Puducherry Legislative Assembly election: Karaikal North
| Party | Candidate | Votes | % | ±% |
|---|---|---|---|---|
| AINRC | P. R. N. Thirumurugan | 13,139 | 49.34 | |
| AIADMK | M. V. Omalingam | 9,841 | 36.96 | −3.34 |
| INC | R. P. Chandramohan | 2,129 | 8.00 | −47.69 |
| NOTA | None of the Above | 408 | 1.53 | |
| BJP | M. Arul Murugan | 402 | 1.51 | −1.45 |
| VCK | N. Selvasundaram | 261 | 0.98 | |
| Independent | P. Manikandan | 176 | 0.66 | |
| Margin of victory | | 3,298 | 12.38 | −3.01 |
| Turnout | | 26,629 | 81.52 | −2.14 |
| Registered electors | | 32,666 | | 25.21 |
| AINRC gain from INC | | Swing | -6.35 | |

=== Assembly Election 2011 ===
2011 Puducherry Legislative Assembly election: Karaikal North
| Party | Candidate | Votes | % | ±% |
|---|---|---|---|---|
| INC | P. R. N. Thirumurugan | 12,155 | 55.69 | |
| AIADMK | V. Omalingam | 8,795 | 40.29 | |
| BJP | M. Arul Murugan | 646 | 2.96 | |
| CPI(ML)L | E. Jayabal | 231 | 1.06 | |
| Margin of victory | | 3,360 | 15.39 | |
| Turnout | | 21,827 | 83.66 | |
| Registered electors | | 26,089 | | |
| INC win (new seat) | | | | |

=== Assembly Election 2006 ===
2006 Pondicherry Legislative Assembly election: Karaikal
| Party | Candidate | Votes | % | ±% |
|---|---|---|---|---|
| DMK | A. M. H. Nazeem | 5,742 | 45.20 | −1.72 |
| DMDK | A. J. Assana | 5,551 | 43.70 | |
| AIADMK | S. Selvaganapathi | 884 | 6.96 | −22.73 |
| BJP | S. S. Saminathan | 327 | 2.57 | |
| Independent | Thanga Devadoss | 64 | 0.50 | |
| Independent | Al Taher @ Z. M. Taher | 60 | 0.47 | |
| Margin of victory | | 191 | 1.50 | −15.73 |
| Turnout | | 12,703 | 80.25 | 19.08 |
| Registered electors | | 15,830 | | −27.62 |
| DMK hold | | Swing | -1.72 | |

=== Assembly Election 2001 ===
2001 Pondicherry Legislative Assembly election: Karaikal
| Party | Candidate | Votes | % | ±% |
|---|---|---|---|---|
| DMK | A. M. H. Nazeem | 6,273 | 46.92 | −24.09 |
| AIADMK | A. J. Assana | 3,969 | 29.69 | 7.61 |
| INC | S. Ramassamy | 2,951 | 22.07 | |
| Independent | T. Devadoss | 103 | 0.77 | |
| Independent | M. Y. Thameemul Ansary | 74 | 0.55 | |
| Margin of victory | | 2,304 | 17.23 | −31.70 |
| Turnout | | 13,370 | 61.17 | 3.82 |
| Registered electors | | 21,870 | | 8.51 |
| DMK hold | | Swing | -12.39 | |

=== Assembly Election 1996 ===
1996 Pondicherry Legislative Assembly election: Karaikal
| Party | Candidate | Votes | % | ±% |
|---|---|---|---|---|
| DMK | A. M. H. Nazeem | 9,474 | 71.01 | 11.70 |
| AIADMK | H. M. Abdul Kader | 2,946 | 22.08 | −16.15 |
| Independent | M. G. Desigan | 476 | 3.57 | |
| BJP | Thiyaga. Thirunvukkarasu | 273 | 2.05 | 0.68 |
| MDMK | L. Janarthanan | 111 | 0.83 | |
| Margin of victory | | 6,528 | 48.93 | 27.85 |
| Turnout | | 13,342 | 67.73 | 10.38 |
| Registered electors | | 20,155 | | −2.10 |
| DMK hold | | Swing | 11.70 | |

=== Assembly Election 1991 ===
1991 Pondicherry Legislative Assembly election: Karaikal
| Party | Candidate | Votes | % | ±% |
|---|---|---|---|---|
| DMK | A. M. H. Nazeem | 6,809 | 59.31 | |
| AIADMK | M. Gnanadesigan | 4,389 | 38.23 | |
| BJP | T. Thrunavukkarasu | 157 | 1.37 | 0.87 |
| JP | M. Mohanraj | 78 | 0.68 | |
| Margin of victory | | 2,420 | 21.08 | 8.68 |
| Turnout | | 11,480 | 57.35 | −6.65 |
| Registered electors | | 20,588 | | 0.80 |
| DMK gain from INC | | Swing | 17.81 | |

=== Assembly Election 1990 ===
1990 Pondicherry Legislative Assembly election: Karaikal
| Party | Candidate | Votes | % | ±% |
|---|---|---|---|---|
| INC | S. M. Thavasu | 5,394 | 41.51 | −8.04 |
| JD | G. Rangayen | 3,783 | 29.11 | |
| Independent | M. G. Jaffar | 3,532 | 27.18 | |
| Independent | A. Ramakrishnan | 78 | 0.60 | |
| BJP | T. Thirunavukkarasu | 65 | 0.50 | |
| Margin of victory | | 1,611 | 12.40 | 0.87 |
| Turnout | | 12,996 | 64.00 | −2.51 |
| Registered electors | | 20,424 | | 39.40 |
| INC hold | | Swing | -8.04 | |

=== Assembly Election 1985 ===
1985 Pondicherry Legislative Assembly election: Karaikal
| Party | Candidate | Votes | % | ±% |
|---|---|---|---|---|
| INC | V. Govindarajan | 4,784 | 49.54 | |
| Independent | V. M. Salih Maricar | 3,671 | 38.02 | |
| JP | G. Rengayen | 1,081 | 11.20 | |
| Independent | K. S. Manimaran | 120 | 1.24 | |
| Margin of victory | | 1,113 | 11.53 | −18.35 |
| Turnout | | 9,656 | 66.51 | −2.29 |
| Registered electors | | 14,651 | | 10.75 |
| INC gain from Independent | | Swing | -5.71 | |

=== Assembly Election 1980 ===
1980 Pondicherry Legislative Assembly election: Karaikal
| Party | Candidate | Votes | % | ±% |
|---|---|---|---|---|
| Independent | V. M. Salih Maricar | 4,778 | 55.25 | |
| JP | M. Jembulingam | 2,194 | 25.37 | |
| Independent | M. Rathakrishnan | 1,292 | 14.94 | |
| INC(U) | G. Rethinavelu | 158 | 1.83 | |
| Independent | K. S. Manyimarane | 144 | 1.67 | |
| Independent | V. Palanivelu Pathar | 82 | 0.95 | |
| Margin of victory | | 2,584 | 29.88 | 8.92 |
| Turnout | | 8,648 | 68.80 | 5.60 |
| Registered electors | | 13,229 | | −11.20 |
| Independent hold | | Swing | 12.41 | |

=== Assembly Election 1977 ===
1977 Pondicherry Legislative Assembly election: Karaikal
| Party | Candidate | Votes | % | ±% |
|---|---|---|---|---|
| Independent | K. Kandhi | 3,995 | 42.84 | |
| JP | S. Ameerudeen | 2,040 | 21.87 | |
| DMK | R. Rajayyan | 1,418 | 15.20 | −5.41 |
| AIADMK | M. Y. Mohamed Ali Marraicar | 1,228 | 13.17 | −28.08 |
| INC | M. Govindarasu | 645 | 6.92 | −31.23 |
| Margin of victory | | 1,955 | 20.96 | 17.86 |
| Turnout | | 9,326 | 63.21 | −17.28 |
| Registered electors | | 14,897 | | 22.55 |
| Independent gain from AIADMK | | Swing | 1.59 | |

=== Assembly Election 1974 ===
1974 Pondicherry Legislative Assembly election: Karaikal
| Party | Candidate | Votes | % | ±% |
|---|---|---|---|---|
| AIADMK | K. Kandhi | 3,964 | 41.24 | |
| INC | P. Shanmugam | 3,666 | 38.14 | |
| DMK | S. S. Mani | 1,981 | 20.61 | |
| Margin of victory | | 298 | 3.10 | |
| Turnout | | 9,611 | 80.49 | |
| Registered electors | | 12,156 | | |
| AIADMK win (new seat) | | | | |

=== Assembly Election 1969 ===
1969 Pondicherry Legislative Assembly election: Karaikal North
| Party | Candidate | Votes | % | ±% |
|---|---|---|---|---|
| INC | M. Jambulingam | 4,208 | 52.07 | −4.32 |
| Independent | A. M. Hameed Maricar | 3,873 | 47.93 | |
| Margin of victory | | 335 | 4.15 | −25.02 |
| Turnout | | 8,081 | 78.59 | −2.21 |
| Registered electors | | 10,452 | | 11.26 |
| INC hold | | Swing | -4.32 | |

=== Assembly Election 1964 ===
1964 Pondicherry Legislative Assembly election: Karaikal North
| Party | Candidate | Votes | % | ±% |
|---|---|---|---|---|
| INC | Farook Maricar | 4,211 | 56.39 | |
| Independent | M. Sembulingam | 2,033 | 27.23 | |
| Independent | Thambisa Maricar | 810 | 10.85 | |
| Independent | Narayanasamy Alias Vembu | 413 | 5.53 | |
| Margin of victory | | 2,178 | 29.17 | |
| Turnout | | 7,467 | 80.80 | |
| Registered electors | | 9,394 | | |
| INC win (new seat) | | | | |

æ

== See also ==
- List of constituencies of the Puducherry Legislative Assembly
- Karaikal district
