= List of urban local bodies in Puducherry =

Puducherry consists of 5 municipalities. Two of them are located in Puducherry district, while the other is located in Karaikal district, Mahe district, and Yanam district. All the municipalities come under the local administration department of the Government of Puducherry.

== List ==
=== Puducherry District ===
- Pondicherry Municipality–The total area is 19.46 km^{2}. The 2011 population was 2,44,377. The Municipality is divided into 42 wards comprising 8 Assembly Constituencies.
- Ozhukarai or Oulgaret Municipality–The total area is 36.75 km^{2}. The 2011 population was 3,00,150. The Municipality is divided into 37 wards.

=== Karaikal District ===
- Karaikal–the Population as per 2011 census is 86,838. It is divided into 18 wards.

=== Mahe District ===
- Mahe Municipality–The 2011 population was 41,816. It is divided into 15 wards.

=== Yanam District ===
- Yanam–The 2011 population was 55,626. It is divided into 10 wards.
