= P. R. N. Thirumurugan =

Indian politician

Cabinet Minister Transport. Adi Dravidar Welfare. Housing. Labour & Employment. Art & Culture. Economics & Statistics.
- Incumbent
- Assumed office 14 March 2024
- Constituency: Karaikal North

Personal details
- Party: All India NR Congress
- Other political affiliations: Indian National Congress
- Education: B. A. (Sociology Tamil)
- Alma mater: Annamalai University
- Profession: Businessman

P. R. N. Thirumurugan is an Indian politician from All India NR Congress. In 2011, he was elected as a member of the Puducherry Legislative Assembly from Karaikal North (constituency). He defeated A. V. Subramanian of Indian National Congress by 12,569 votes in 2021 Puducherry Assembly election.
