= Pondicherry Representative Assembly =

Government body in India

Pondicherry Representative Assembly Assemblée représentative de Pondichéry

Type
- Type: Unicameral
- Term limits: 5 years

History
- Founded: June 1955
- Disbanded: 30 June 1963
- Preceded by: Representative Assembly of French India
- Succeeded by: Pondicherry Legislative Assembly
- Seats: 39

Elections
- Voting system: First-past-the-post
- First election: 1955
- Last election: 1959

Meeting place
- Assembly Building, rue Victor Simonel, Pondicherry

After the merger of French settlements into an Indian union, a new assembly, named the Pondicherry Representative Assembly, was created by the government of India. After the "de facto transfer day" of 1 October 1954, before 16 August 1962 also referred to as "de-jure transfer day". During this transition period, general elections to the representative assembly were held in 1955 and 1959. After the de-jure transfer day, legal integration of French settlements into the Indian Union was complete. However, this assembly, like its predecessor, was advisory (to the chief commissioner) in its role, which led to frequent contention between the popular government and the chief commissioner.

== Background ==
In 1946, French India (Inde française) became an overseas territory (Territoire d'outre-mer) of France. In the same year, on 25 October, the Representative Assembly of French India (Assemblée représentative de l'Inde française) was created and replaced the general council (conseil général).

During the start of the Fourth Republic, decree nº 46–2381, dated 25 October 1946, was passed by the government of France, instituting the Representative Assembly in French India. This original assembly had 44 seats, but after the merger of Changernagore, its size was reduced to 39. A member of this assembly was referred to as a councillor and held a five-year fixed term.

The de facto transfer of French settlements in India took place on 1 November 1954. In January 1955, the Indian union government renamed these four French settlements to the Union Territory of Pondicherry. On 11 June 1955, the government of India dissolved the Representative Assembly of French India. After extending the 1951 People's Representative Act of the Indian Union to the state of Pondicherry, fresh elections were held to the Pondicherry Representative Assembly in July 1955, based on universal adult franchise.

== Tenures of different Representative Assemblies of the State of Pondicherry ==
Election year	Assembly	Period	Ruling party	President (Note: Equivalent to speaker in contemporary Indian assemblies)	Vice president (Note: Equivalent to Deputy Speaker in the contemporary Indian assemblies)
1955	1st Assembly	17 August 1955 – 28 October 1958	Indian National Congress	R.L. Purushothama Reddiar; Kamisetty Parasuram	Kamisetty Parasuram; N.A.
1959	2nd Assembly	Aug 1959 – 30 June 1962	Indian National Congress	A. S. Gangeyan	N.A.

== Commune-wise allocation of seats ==
After 1951, French India consisted of four "settlements" (French: établissements), namely, Pondichéry, Karikal, Mahé, and Yanaon. The Assemblée Représentative of French India allocated 39 seats to its 17 communes. Pondichéry and Karaikal had 8 and 6 electoral constituencies (circonscriptions électorales), respectively, while Mahé and Yanaon had one each.

As per Article 2 of the decree, the composition of the assembly is determined as follows:

- Établissement de Pondichéry (22 seats)
  - Pondichéry: 6
  - Ariancoupom: 2
  - Bahour: 2
  - Modéliarpeth: 2
  - Oulgaret: 4
  - Nettapacom: 2
  - Tiroubouvané: 2
  - Villenour: 2
- Établissement de Karaikal (12 seats)
  - Karaikal Ville: 4
  - Cotchéry: 2
  - Grand'Aldée: 2
  - Neravy: 1
  - Nédouncadou: 1
  - Tirnoular: 2
- Établissement de Mahé (3 seats)
  - Mahé: 3
- Établissement de Yanaon (2 seats)
  - Yanaon: 2

== List of seats ==
Constituencies of the Pondicherry Representative Assembly
Settlements (Établissements)	Seats (sièges)	Constituencies (circonscriptions)
Pondicherry	22	Pondicherry: Mouttalpeth, Couroussoucoupom, Cassicade, Pondicherry, Bussy Street, Ouppalam; Ariancoupom: Archivak–Ariancoupom, Tavalacoupom; Bahour: Bahour, Courouvinatam–Karaiamputtur; Modéliarpeth: Mouroungapacom, Nellitope; Oulgaret:Oulgaret, Calapeth, Saram–Lawspet, Rettiarpaleom; Nettapacom: Nettappakam, Embalam; Tiroubouvané: Sellipet–Suthukeni, Mannadipet; Villenour: Villenour, Oussoudou
Karaikal	12	Cotchéry: Cotchéry-Mada Kovil, Thirumeniyazhagar; Karikal : Karikal Nord, Karikal Centre, Karikal Sud, Karaikovilpattu; Tirnoular: Tirounalar-Tharparinswarar Kovil, Tirounalar-Padhrakaliamman Kovil; Néravy: Néravy; Neduncadou: Neduncadou; Grand Aldée: Grand Aldée-Nord, Grand Aldée-Sud
Mahé	3	Mahé: Mahé (Ville), Pallor, Pandakkal
Yanaon	2	Yanaon: Cancalapeth, Adi Andhrapeth

== 1955 Pondicherry Representative Assembly election ==
The 1955 Pondicherry Representative Assembly election was held from 18 to 23 July. Initially, Maurice Pakkiriswamy Pillai led the Pondicherry Representative Assembly from 17 August 1955, until his death in January 1956. At that point, another cabinet was formed, comprising Eduard Goubert, Chandrasekhara Chettiar, Mohammed Yusoof, S. Dakshinamoorthy Mudaliar, and Thiagraja Naicker.

== 1959 Pondicherry Representative Assembly election ==
The 1959 Pondicherry Representative Assembly election was held from 11 to 14 August. Among the winners, a six-member council of ministers was formed under the leadership of V. Venkatasubba Reddiar and included Eduard Goubert, C. E. Barathan, Gouroussamy Pillai, P. Shanmugam, and Mohamed Ismail Maricar.

== Assembly building inauguration ==
The representative assembly building was inaugurated during the Second Assembly by then-commissioner S. K. Dutta, on 11 August 1961. However, that event was boycotted by leaders of the People's Front, which was the principal opposition party. The deputy leader of the opposition, M. M. Hussaine, clarified that it was a passive demonstration to garner attention from the central government in order to hasten the process of de jure transfer. A resolution urging this transfer was passed by the assembly in November 1959.

== Dissolution ==
The French settlements in India were de jure transferred on 16 August 1962. The Pondicherry Representative Assembly functioned until 30 June 1963 and was succeeded by the Puducherry Legislative Assembly. The Indian Parliament enacted the Government of Union Territories Act, 1963, which came into force on 1 July 1963, and the pattern of government prevailing in the rest of the country was introduced in this territory also, but subject to certain limitations. Edouard Goubert became the chief minister in the subsequent Pondicherry Legislative Assembly.

== See also ==
- Representative Assembly of French India
- Municipal Administration in French India
- French colonial empire
