= Édouard Goubert =

Indian politician (1894–1979)

1sth Chief Minister of Pondicherry
- In office 1 July 1963 – 24 August 1964
- Lieutenant Governor: Sisir Kumar Dutta; K.J. Somasundaram; S.L. Silam
- Preceded by: Office Established
- Succeeded by: V. Venkatasubha Reddiar
- Constituency: Mannadipet

Member of the 1955 Pondicherry Representative Assembly
- In office 18 July 1955 – 28 October 1958
- Preceded by: Office Established
- Succeeded by: K. Subrahmania Padayachi
- Constituency: Bahour

Member of the 1955 Pondicherry Representative Assembly
- In office 11 August 1959 – 30 June 1963
- Preceded by: Thandapani Kounder
- Constituency: Mannadipet

Member of 1st Puducherry Assembly
- In office 1 July 1963 – 24 August 1964
- Preceded by: Himself
- Succeeded by: Manickavasaga Reddiar
- Constituency: Mannadipet

Member of 2nd Puducherry Assembly
- In office 29 August 1964 – 19 September 1968
- Preceded by: A. S. Gangeyan
- Succeeded by: D. Kantharaj,
- Constituency: Raj Nivas

Mayor of Pondicherry
- In office 1961–1963

Personal details
- Born: 29 July 1894 Pondichéry, French India
- Died: 14 August 1979 (aged 85) Bangalore, Karnataka, India
- Party: Indian National Congress
- Other political affiliations: National Democratic Front (1946- 1947); French India Socialist Party (1947- 1954)

Édouard Goubert (French pronunciation: [edwaʁ ɡubɛʁ]; 29 July 1894 – 14 August 1979) was mayor and first chief minister of Pondicherry between 1 July 1963 and 11 September 1964. Initially a strongly pro-French leader, he later shifted towards the pro-merger Indian National Congress, which ultimately became the death knell for the sovereignty of France's comptoirs (trading posts) in India. He and Lambert Saravane founded the French India Socialist Party in July 1947.

Goubert was popularly known as Pappa Goubert.

== Early life and career ==
Goubert was born in Pondicherry on 29 July 1894 to a French father and Franco-Indian mother. He received his education in French Indochina and studied Law in France. He began his career in the colonial administration and worked as a clerk at the Pondicherry Court. In 1951, he ran as a candidate of the Democratic and Socialist Union of the Resistance for the seat of French India in the French National Assembly (Assemblée Nationale). Goubert won the election with an overwhelming majority of 99.3% of the vote.

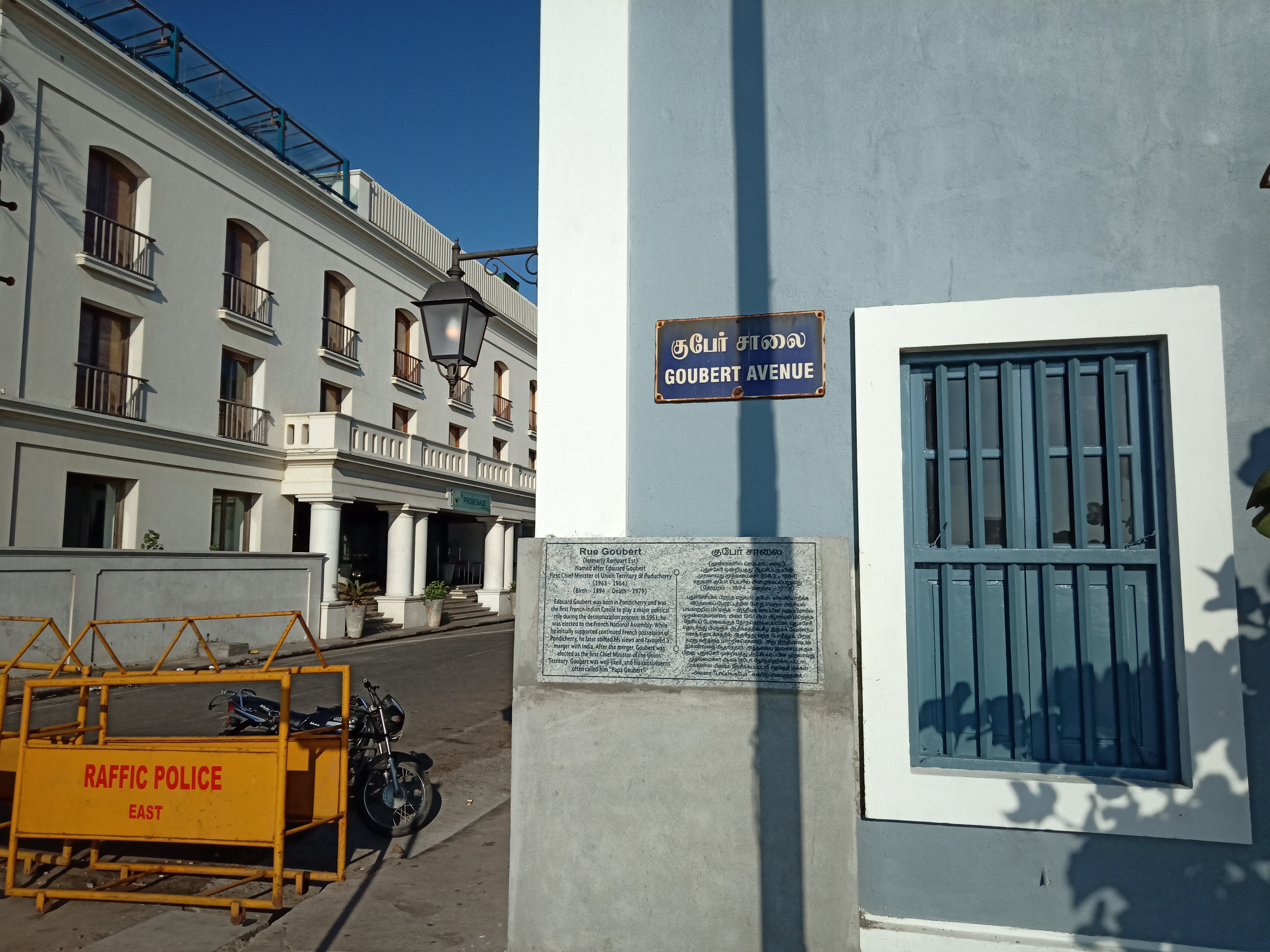
Goubert Avenue in Puducherry

A referendum on the future of French India was held in Chandernagore, the territory right outside of Calcutta, on 19 June 1949. Out of 12,184 registered voters (drawn from a population of 44,500), 7,473 voted for merger with India while only 114 votes were cast in favor of inclusion in the French Union. While a similar referendum was supposed to be held in the remaining four territories, those referendums never took place.

Initially, Goubert attempted to negotiate a special status for French India that would make it autonomous from both France and India. However, neither the French nor Indian governments agreed to the demand. By 1954, Goubert shifted his loyalty towards the pro-India faction and supported the annexation of French possessions to the Indian Union. In March 1954, he traveled to Pondicherry and took part in an agitation demanding the merger of French India with the Indian Union. On 29 June 1954, his parliamentary immunity was abolished. On 1 November 1954, France signed treaties transferring sovereignty of French possessions to India, ending Goubert's tenure in the French National Assembly.

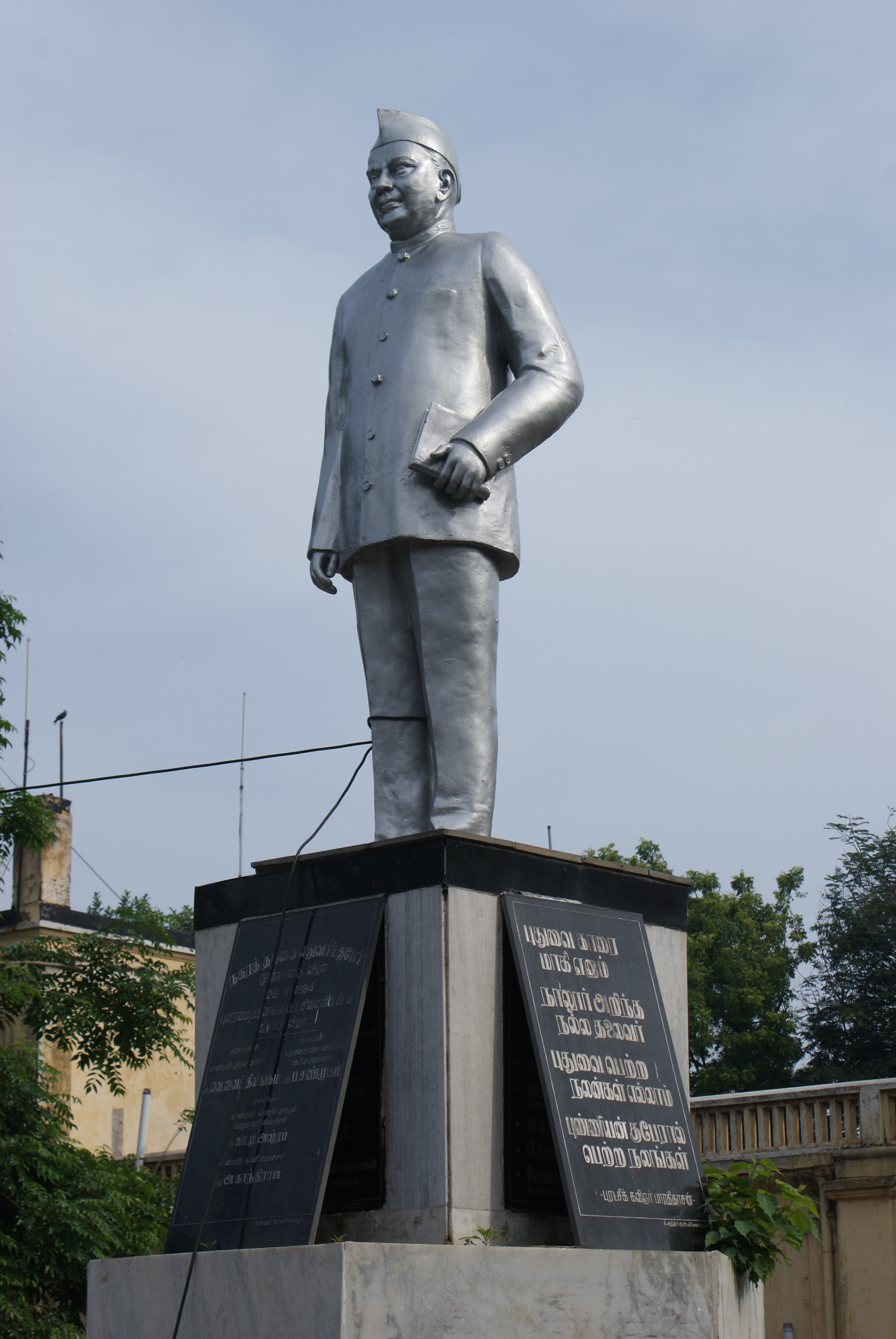
Statue of Edouard Goubert in Puducherry

== Death ==
Edouard Goubert died in Bangalore, Karnataka on 14 August 1979.

== See also ==
- Coup d'état of Yanaon
- Puducherry Legislative Assembly
- Municipal administration in French India
