= Puducherry Makkal Congress =

- Leader: A Elumalai
- Founder: P. Kannan
- Founded: 2000
- Dissolved: 2002
- Split from: TMC(M)
- Merged into: INC
- Succeeded by: PMC
- National affiliation: NDA&DMK+

The Pondicherry Makkal Congress, or Puducherry Makkal Congress (Puducherry Popular Congress), was a political party in the Indian union territory Puducherry (formerly known as Pondicherry). The PMC was formed as a splinter group of the Tamil Maanila Congress. It was founded by former member of parliament former speaker P Kannan The leader of the PMC was Abar Elumalai. In the assembly elections of Puducherry in 2001, the PMC won four seat (out of 30). Until 2001, the PMC supported the National Democratic Alliance, but then it started to support Indian National Congress. In August 2002 the PMC merged with the INC.

However, P. Kannan left Congress after that Democratic Progressive Alliance had allotted the Puducherry seat to Pattali Makkal Katchi ahead of the 2004 Lok Sabha elections.

During 2005-09, P.Kannan had formed a new party, the Puducherry Munnetra Congress.In 25 September 2019 he floated a new political party – Makkal Munnetra Congress (MMC), later joined BJP in 2021 and resigned & deceased in 2023.

== See also ==
- Indian National Congress breakaway parties
