= Government of Puducherry =

Territorial government of Puducherry

Government of Puducherry: - French: Gouvernement de Poudouchéry; Tamil: புதுச்சேரி அரசு; Telugu: పుదుచ్చేరి ప్రభుత్వము; Malayalam: പുതുച്ചേരി സർക്കാർ
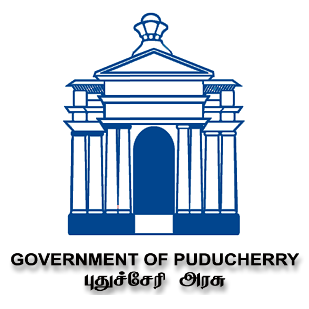
- Seat of Government: Puducherry Legislative Assembly Building, Puducherry
- Website: puducherry.gov.in

Legislative branch
- Assembly: Puducherry Legislative Assembly
- Speaker: Embalam R. Selvam, BJP
- Deputy Speaker: P. Rajavelu, AINRC
- Members in Assembly: 33 (30 elected & 3 nominated)

Executive branch
- Lieutenant Governor (Head of the state): Kuniyil Kailashnathan
- Chief Minister (Head of the government): N. Rangaswamy
- Chief Secretary: Sharat Chauhan, IAS
- Headquarters: Puducherry Government Secretariat, Goubert Avenue, Puducherry
- Departments: 44

Judiciary branch
- High Court: Madras High Court
- Chief Justice: Munishwar Nath Bhandari
- Seat: Chennai

Government of Puducherry (Tamil: Putuccēri aracu, Malayalam: Putuccēri sarkkār, Telugu: Puduccēri prabhutvamu, French: Gouvernement de Poudouchéry) is the union territorial government for the union territory of Puducherry, India. It is headed by the Lieutenant Governor of Puducherry. Its capital is located at Pondicherry.

== Government and administration ==
=== Lieutenant governor ===
The Lt. Governor is appointed by the President for a term of five years. The executive and legislative powers lie with the Chief Minister and his council of ministers, who are appointed by the President. The Governors of the states and territories of India have similar powers and functions at the state level as that of the President of India at Union level. Only Indian citizens above 35 years of age are eligible for appointment. Governors discharge all constitutional functions such as the appointment of the Chief Minister, sending reports to the President about failure of constitutional machinery in a state, or with respect to issues relating to the assent to a bill passed by legislature, exercise or their own opinion.

Kuniyil Kailashnathan is the present Lt. Governor. The Governor enjoys many different types of powers:

1. Executive powers related to administration, appointments and removals.
2. Legislative powers related to lawmaking and the state legislature.
3. Discretionary powers to be carried out according to the discretion of the Governor.

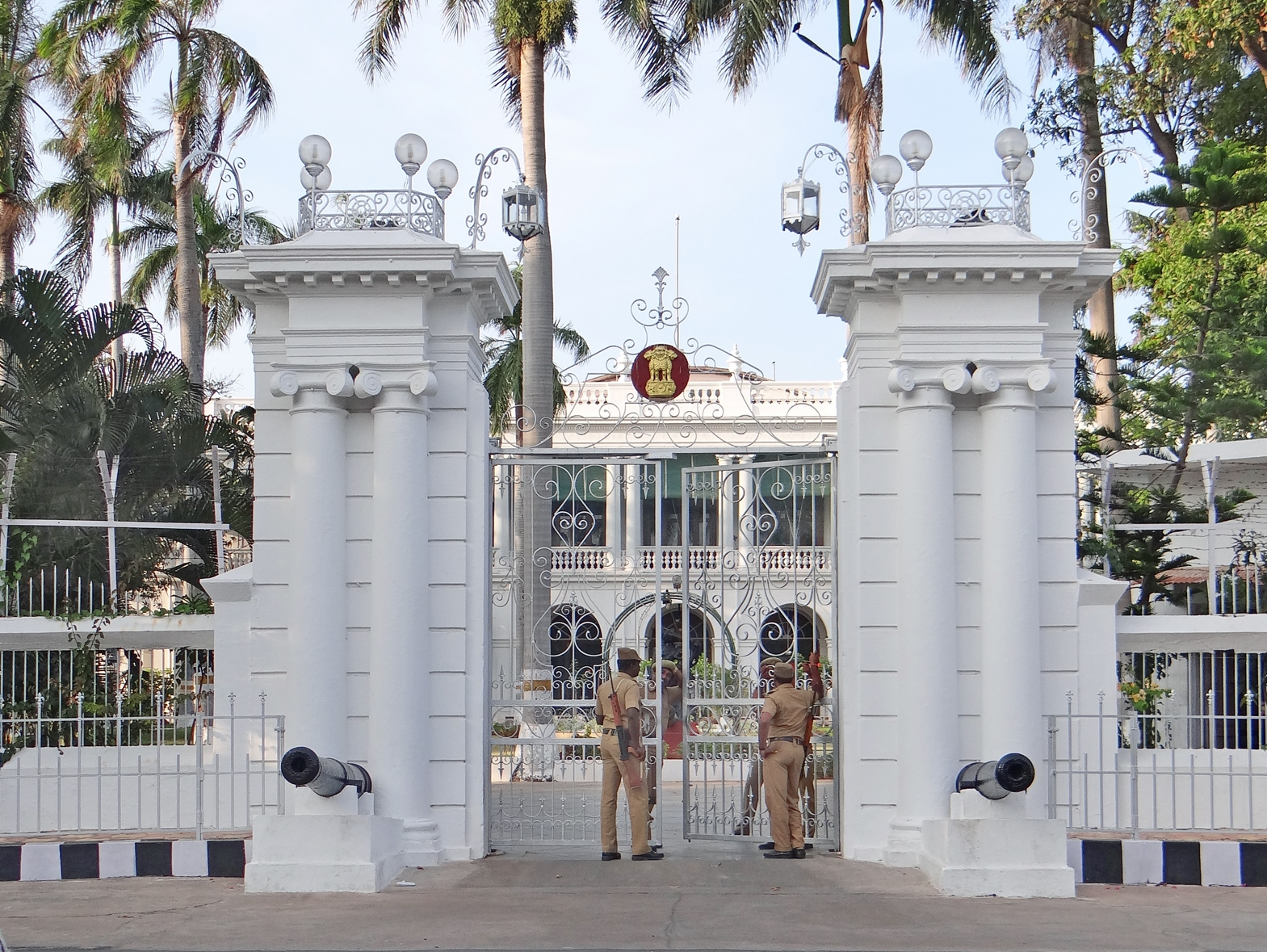
Raj Niwas, Puducherry, official residence of the Lieutenant Governor of Puducherry

The legislative branch comprises the governor and the legislative assembly, which is the highest political organ in state. The governor has the power to summon the assembly or to close the same. All members of the legislative assembly are directly elected, normally once in every five years by the eligible voters who are above 18 years of age. The current assembly consists of 30 elected members and 3 members nominated by Central Government.The elected members select one of its own members as its chairman who is called the speaker. The speaker is assisted by the deputy speaker who is also elected by the members. The conduct of meeting in the house is the responsibility of the Speaker.

The main function of the assembly is to pass laws and rules. Every bill passed by the house has to be finally approved by the governor before it becomes applicable.

The normal term of the legislative assembly is five years from the date appointed for its first meeting. But while a proclamation of state of emergency is in operation, the said period will be extended by Parliament by Laws for a period not exceeding one year at a time.

The last elections to the Puducherry Legislative Assembly were held in April–May 2021.

=== Judiciary ===
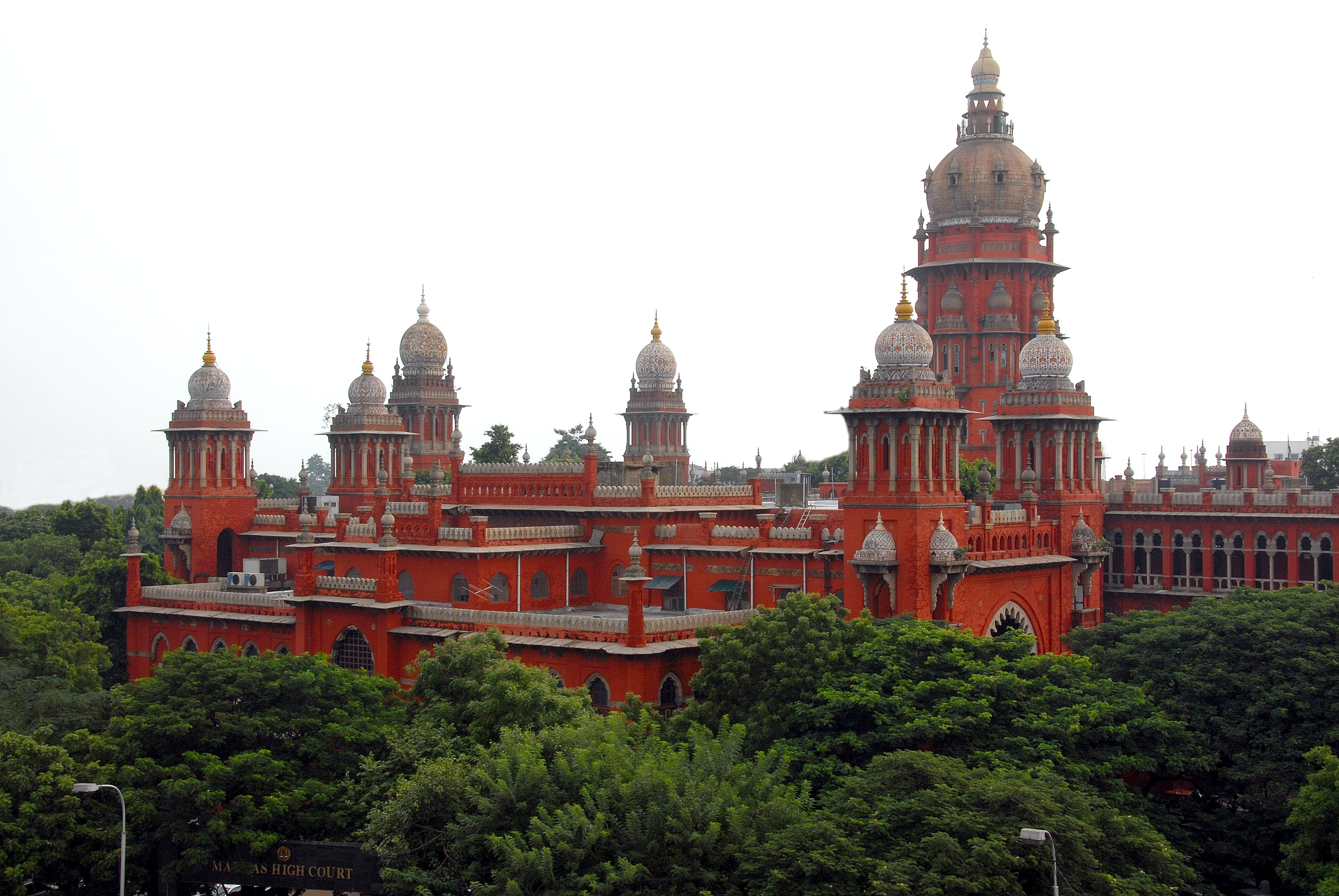
Madras High Court, Chennai

The Madras High Court is the court for this territory, which is the same for Tamil Nadu. It is a court of record and has all the powers of such a court including the authority to punish an individual for contempt of court. Like all other High Courts of India, this court also consists of a Chief Justice and other judges who are appointed by the President of India. Every judge including the Chief Justice is appointed by the President of India by Warrant under his hand and seal. Every permanent and additional judge will continue in office until the age of 62.

=== Executive ===
Like in other Indian states, the Executive arm of the state is responsible for the day-to-day management of the state. It consists of the Governor, the Chief Minister and the Council of Ministers. The Chief Minister and the council of ministers also have been appointed by the governor. Governor summons prorogues and dissolves the legislature. He can close the legislative assembly on the recommendations by the Chief Minister. Judiciary has been separated from the executive in Pondicherry like other Indian states.

==== Chief Minister ====
The executive authority is headed by the Chief Minister of Puducherry, who is the de facto head of the territory and is vested with most of the executive powers; the Legislative Assembly's majority party leader is appointed to this position by the Lieutenant Governor of Puducherry. Generally, the winning party decides the chief minister. In many cases, the party focuses a chief ministerial candidate during the election.

==== Council of Ministers ====
S.No	Name	Constituency	Department		Party
1.	N. Rangaswamy; Chief Minister (since 7 June 2021)	Thattanchavady	Finance.; Planning.; Port.; General Administration.; Local Administration.; Revenue & Excise.; Health & Family Welfare.; Confidential & Cabinet.	Cooperation.; Hindu Religious Institutions.; Wakf Board.; Science, Technology & Environment.; Information & Publicity.; Town & Country Planning.; Any other department not allotted to any other Minister.	AINRC
Cabinet Ministers
2.	A. Namassivayam (since 27 June 2021)	Mannadipet	Home.; Electricity.; Industries & Commerce.	Education including Collegiate Education.; Sports & Youth Affairs.; Sainik Welfare.	BJP
3.	K. Lakshminarayanan (since 27 June 2021)	Raj Bhavan	Public Works.; Tourism & Civil Aviation.; Fisheries & Fishermen Welfare.	Law.; Information Technology.; Stationery & Printing.	AINRC
4.	C. Djeacoumar (since 27 June 2021)	Mangalam	Agriculture.; Animal Husbandry & Animal Welfare.; Forest & Wildlife.	Social Welfare.; Backward Class Welfare.; Women & Child Development.	AINRC
5.	P. R. N. Thirumurugan (since 14 March 2024)	Karaikal North	Transport.; Adi Dravidar Welfare.; Housing.	Labour & Employment.; Art & Culture.; Economics & Statistics.	AINRC
6.	A. K. Sai J. Saravanan Kumar (since 27 June 2021)	Ossudu	Civil Supplies & Consumer Affairs.; DRDA.; Community Development.	Urban Basic Services.; Fire Services.; Minority Affairs.	BJP

=== Departments ===
- Accounts and Treasuries
- Adi Dravidar Welfare
- Agriculture
- Animal Husbandry
- Arts & Culture
- Chief Vigilance Office
- Civil Supplies and Consumer Affairs
- Commercial Taxes
- Co-operative Societies
- Economics & Statistics
- Elections
- Electricity
- Fire Service
- Fisheries & Fishermen Welfare
- Forestry & Wild Life
- Government Automobile Workshop
- Health & Family Welfare Services
- Higher & Technical Education
- Hindu Religious Institutions
- Industries & Commerce
- Information & Publicity
- Information Technology
- Labour
- Law
- Local Administration
- Personnel and Administrative Reforms
- Planning & Research
- Police
- Port
- Prisons
- Public Works
- Revenue and Disaster Management
- Rural Development
- School Education
- Science, Technology & Environment
- Social Welfare
- Stationery & Printing
- Tourism
- Town and Country Planning
- Transport
- Women & Child Development

== Politics ==
Pondicherry is a Union territory currently ruled by the All India N.R. Congress and BJP alliance. The state assembly has 33 seats out of which 30 are elected by the people. The All India N.R. Congress has 10 seats and its alliance partner BJP has 6 seats, thus taking the government's majority to 16 seats. DMK is the main opposition party with 6 seats. There are 6 independent candidates elected by the people. The remaining 3 candidates from Central Government (NDA) have been appointed by Ministry of Home Affairs.
