= A. V. Subramanian =

Indian politician

President Puducherry Pradesh Congress Committee
- In office 4 March 2020 – 9 June 2023
- Preceded by: A. Namassivayam
- Succeeded by: V. Vaithilingam

Personal details
- Party: Indian National Congress

A. V. Subramanian is an Indian politician who served as Speaker of 10th Puducherry Legislative Assembly and Deputy Speaker of 9th and 11th Puducherry Legislative Assembly and former President of Puducherry Pradesh Congress Committee.

== Personal life ==
In August 2020, he tested positive for SARS-CoV-2.
