= V. Venkatasubba Reddiar =

Indian politician

V.Venkatasubba Reddiar
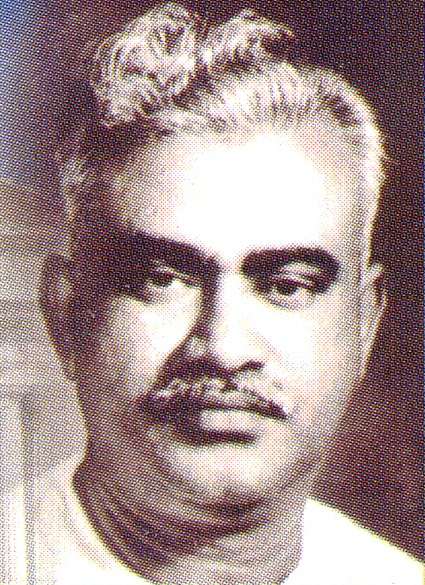

2nd Chief Minister of Pondicherry
- In office 6 March 1968 – 17 September 1968
- Preceded by: M. O. H. Farook
- Succeeded by: President's rule
- Constituency: Nettapakkam
- In office 11 September 1964 – 8 April 1967
- Preceded by: Edouard Goubert
- Succeeded by: M. O. H. Farook
- Constituency: Nettapakkam

Personal details
- Born: 18 December 1909 Pondicherry
- Died: 6 June 1982 (aged 72)
- Party: Congress

Vaithilingam Venkatasubba Reddiar was the second Chief Minister of the Union Territory of Pondicherry (Puducherry). He was born in a wealthy agricultural family at Madukkarai, Pondicherry. His parents are Vaithilingam Reddiar and Vemalammal. His father Vaithilingam Reddiar was the Mayor of Nettapakkam commune during French rule. His son V. Vaithilingam also served as the Chief Minister of Pondicherry.

== Political career ==
According to The Hindu, Reddiar was "considered one of the architects who spearheaded the freedom struggle movement against the French ... [he] was in the vanguard of defiant mass movements against the foreign rule. Congressmen in these parts look upon him as the Father of the movement to liberate Pondicherry." In 1946, as Mayor of Nettapakkam, he joined with the Mayor of Pondicherry (K. Muthu Pillai) to demand the French leave the territory and allow it to merge with the Indian Union. Twelve leaders including Reddiar formed a parallel government against French Government on 31 March 1954; Pondicherry merged with the Indian Union on 13 October 1954. On 1 July 1963, Reddiar became the Public Works Minister of Pondicherry and subsequently, became Chief Minister.

== See also ==
- 1959 Pondicherry Representative Assembly election
- 1964 Pondicherry Legislative Assembly election

| Preceded by Edouard Goubert | Chief Minister of Pondicherry; 11 September 1964 – 9 April 1967 | Succeeded by M. O. H. Farook |
| Preceded by M. O. H. Farook | Chief Minister of Pondicherry; 6 March 1968 – 18 September 1968 | Succeeded by President's rule |
