= M. O. H. Farook =

Indian politician

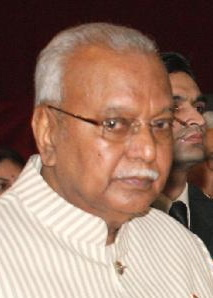
- Farook in 2010

18th Governor of Kerala
- In office 8 September 2011 – 26 January 2012
- Chief Minister: Oommen Chandy
- Preceded by: R. S. Gavai
- Succeeded by: Hansraj Bhardwaj

6th Governor of Jharkhand
- In office 22 January 2010 – 4 September 2011
- Chief Minister: Shibu Soren; Arjun Munda
- Preceded by: Kateekal Sankaranarayanan
- Succeeded by: Syed Ahmed

3rd Chief Minister of Pondicherry
- In office 16 March 1985 – 19 January 1989
- Lieutenant Governor: Tribhuvan Prasad Tiwary, Ranjit Singh Dyal
- Preceded by: President's rule
- Succeeded by: M. D. R. Ramachandran
- In office 17 March 1969 – 3 January 1974
- Lieutenant Governor: B. D. Jatti, Chhedilal
- Preceded by: President's rule
- Succeeded by: Subramanyan Ramaswamy
- In office 9 April 1967 – 6 March 1968
- Lieutenant Governor: S. L. Silam, B. D. Jatti
- Preceded by: V. Venkatasubha Reddiar
- Succeeded by: V. Venkatasubha Reddiar

Member of Parliament (Lok Sabha) for Pondicherry
- In office 6 October 1999 – 16 May 2004
- Preceded by: S. Arumugam
- Succeeded by: M. Ramadass
- In office 20 June 1991 – 10 March 1998
- Preceded by: P. Shanmugam
- Succeeded by: S. Arumugam

Personal details
- Born: 6 September 1937 Pondicherry, French India (present day Puducherry, India)
- Died: 26 January 2012 (aged 74) Chennai, Tamil Nadu, India
- Party: Indian National Congress; Dravida Munnetra Kazhagam
- Spouse: S. A. Kadhija Nachiyal (m. 1960)
- Children: M. O. H. F. Shahjahan (son); Two daughters
- Parents: M. O. Hasan Kuthoos Maricar (father); Seyed Sultangani (mother)
- Education: Loyola College, Chennai
- Occupation: Politician

M. O. Hasan Farook Maricar (6 September 1937 – 26 January 2012) was an Indian politician and three-time Chief Minister of the Union Territory of Pondicherry. He was the youngest chief minister of any Union Territory of India. He served from 9 April 1967 to 6 March 1968 and 17 March 1969 to 3 January 1974 and from 1985 to 1990 He was thrice elected to the Lok Sabha from Pondicherry in 1991, 1996 and 1999 and served as a Union Minister of State for Civil Aviation and Tourism during June 1991 – December 1992.

Farook participated in the struggle for liberation of Pondicherry as a student, during 1953–54 when Pondicherry was a French colony and served as a Member of the Central Haj Committee in Mumbai from 1975 to 2000. He was appointed the Indian Ambassador to Saudi Arabia in September 2004.

== Governor ==
Farook was appointed Governor of Jharkhand in 2010 and of Kerala in 2011.

== Death ==
He died in office on 26 January 2012 at 9:10 pm at Apollo Hospital in Chennai, due to multiple myeloma and kidney related ailments. He was 74 years old at the time of his death. He was the second governor who died in office, after Sikander Bakht, and is the shortest-served governor of Kerala. He was hospitalised for more than a month, and his condition deteriorated in the days preceding his death. As he was near death, additional charge was given to the then Karnataka Governor Hansraj Bhardwaj. In his absence, the flag hoisting ceremony of Republic Day of India in Thiruvananthapuram was conducted by the then Chief Minister of Kerala, Oommen Chandy. He was buried with full state honours at Puducherry Juma Masjid.

Government offices
Preceded by V. Venkatasubha Reddiar	Chief Minister of Pondicherry; 9 April 1967 – 6 March 1968	Succeeded by V. Venkatasubha Reddiar
Preceded by President's rule	Chief Minister of Pondicherry; 17 March 1969 – 3 January 1974	Succeeded by Subramanyan Ramaswamy
Preceded by President's rule	Chief Minister of Pondicherry; 16 March 1985 – 19 January 1989	Succeeded by President's rule
Preceded by P. Shanmugam	Member of Indian Parliament (Lok Sabha) for Pondicherry; 1991–1998	Succeeded by S. Arumugham
Preceded by S. Arumugham	Member of Indian Parliament (Lok Sabha) for Pondicherry; 1999–2004	Succeeded by M. Ramadass
Preceded by Kamaluddin Ahmed	Ambassador of India to Saudi Arabia; September 2004 – December 2009	Succeeded by Talmiz Ahmad
Preceded by Kateekal Sankaranarayanan	Governor of Jharkhand; 22 January 2010 – 4 September 2011	Succeeded by Syed Ahmed
Preceded by R.S. Gavai	Governor of Kerala; 8 September 2011 – 26 January 2012	Succeeded by Hansraj Bhardwaj
