= 15th Puducherry Assembly =

Government assembly in India

←	14th Puducherry Assembly	16th Puducherry Assembly	→

Overview
- Legislative body: Pondicherry Legislative Assembly
- Term: 16 June 2021 – 15 June 2026
- Election: 2021 Puducherry Legislative Assembly election
- Government: National Democratic Alliance
- Opposition: Dravida Munetra Kazhagam
- Members: 30+3
- Speaker: Embalam R. Selvam
- Deputy Speaker: P. Rajavelu
- Chief Minister: N. Rangasamy
- Leader of the Opposition: R. Siva

The Fifteenth Assembly of Pondicherry succeeded the 14th Assembly of Pondicherry and was constituted after the victory of National Democratic Alliance in the 2021 assembly election that was held on 6 April 2021.

== Important members ==
- Speaker:
  - Embalam R. Selvam from 16 June 2021.
- Deputy Speaker:
  - P. Rajavelu from 25 August 2021 to 2. Jun. 2019
- Chief Minister:
  - N. Rangasamy since 7 May 2021.
- Leader of opposition:
  - R. Siva since 8 May 2021.

== Composition ==
Alliance	Party	No. of MLAs	Leader of the party
Government; NDA; Seats: 24	All India N.R. Congress	10	N. Rangasamy
Government; NDA; Seats: 24	Bharatiya Janata Party	9	A. Namassivayam
Government; NDA; Seats: 24	Independent	5	—N/a
Opposition; SPA; Seats: 9	Dravida Munnetra Kazhagam	6	R. Siva
Opposition; SPA; Seats: 9	Indian National Congress	2	M. Vaithianathan
Opposition; SPA; Seats: 9	Independent	1	—N/a

== Members of Legislative Assembly ==
District	No.	Constituency	Name	Party	Alliance	Remarks
Puducherry	1	Mannadipet	A. Namassivayam	Bharatiya Janata Party	NDA	
Puducherry	2	Thirubuvanai (SC)	P. Angalane	Independent	NDA	
Puducherry	3	Ossudu (SC)	A. K. Sai J. Saravanan Kumar	Bharatiya Janata Party	NDA	
Puducherry	4	Mangalam	C. Djeacoumar	All India N.R. Congress	NDA	
Puducherry	5	Villianur	R. Siva	Dravida Munnetra Kazhagam	SPA	
Puducherry	6	Ozhukarai	M. Sivasankar	Independent	NDA	
Puducherry	7	Kadirkamam	S. Ramesh	All India N.R. Congress	NDA	
Puducherry	8	Indira Nagar	V. Aroumougam A. K. D.	All India N.R. Congress	NDA	
Puducherry	9	Thattanchavady	N. Rangaswamy	All India N.R. Congress	NDA	
Puducherry	10	Kamaraj Nagar	A. Johnkumar	Bharatiya Janata Party	NDA	
Puducherry	11	Lawspet	M. Vaithianathan	Indian National Congress	SPA	
Puducherry	12	Kalapet	P. M. L. Kalyanasundaram	Bharatiya Janata Party	NDA	
Puducherry	13	Muthialpet	J. Prakash Kumar	Independent	NDA	
Puducherry	14	Raj Bhavan	K. Lakshminarayanan	All India N.R. Congress	NDA	
Puducherry	15	Oupalam	Anibal Kennedy	Dravida Munnetra Kazhagam	SPA	
Puducherry	16	Orleampeth	G. Nehru Kuppusamy	Independent	SPA	
Puducherry	17	Nellithope	Richards Johnkumar	Bharatiya Janata Party	NDA	
Puducherry	18	Mudaliarpet	L. Sambath	Dravida Munnetra Kazhagam	SPA	
Puducherry	19	Ariankuppam	R. Baskar	All India N.R. Congress	NDA	
Puducherry	20	Manavely	Embalam R. Selvam	Bharatiya Janata Party	NDA	
Puducherry	21	Embalam (SC)	U. Lakshmikandhan	All India N.R. Congress	NDA	
Puducherry	22	Nettapakkam (SC)	P. Rajavelu	All India N.R. Congress	NDA	
Puducherry	23	Bahour	R. Senthilkumar	Dravida Munnetra Kazhagam	SPA	
Karaikal	24	Nedungadu (SC)	Chandira Priyanga	All India N.R. Congress	NDA	
Karaikal	25	Thirunallar	P. R. Siva	Independent	NDA	
Karaikal	26	Karaikal North	P. R. N. Thirumurugan	All India N.R. Congress	NDA	
Karaikal	27	Karaikal South	A. M. H. Nazeem	Dravida Munnetra Kazhagam	SPA	
Karaikal	28	Neravy T. R. Pattinam	M. Nagathiyagarajan	Dravida Munnetra Kazhagam	SPA	
Mahe	29	Mahe	Ramesh Parambath	Indian National Congress	SPA	
Yanam	30	Yanam	Gollapalli Srinivas Ashok	Independent	NDA	
N/A	31	Nominated	V. Selvam	Bharatiya Janata Party	NDA	
N/A	32	Nominated	E. Theeppainthan	Bharatiya Janata Party	NDA	
N/A	33	Nominated	S. Rajasekaran	Bharatiya Janata Party	NDA	

== See also ==
- Government of Puducherry
- List of chief ministers of Puducherry
- List of speakers of the Puducherry Legislative Assembly
- List of lieutenant governors of Puducherry
- Puducherry Legislative Assembly
- Pondicherry Representative Assembly
- 2021 Puducherry Legislative Assembly election
- 2016 Puducherry Legislative Assembly election
- First Assembly of Puducherry
