= 16th Puducherry Assembly =

Government assembly in India

←	15th Puducherry Assembly	17th Puducherry Assembly	→

Overview
- Legislative body: Pondicherry Legislative Assembly
- Term: 2026 –
- Election: 2026 Puducherry Legislative Assembly election
- Government: Rangaswamy V
- Opposition: Dravida Munetra Kazhagam
- Members: 30+3
- Chief Minister: N. Rangasamy

The Sixteenth Assembly of Puducherry succeeds the 15th Assembly of Puducherry and will be constituted sooner following the victory of National Democratic Alliance in the 2026 assembly election that was held on 9 April 2026.

== Important members ==
- Speaker:
  - TBA
- Deputy Speaker:
  - TBA
- Chief Minister:
  - N. Rangasamy since 7 May 2021.
- Leader of opposition:
  - TBA

== Composition ==
Alliance	Party	No. of MLAs	Leader of the party
Government; NDA; Seats: 20	All India N.R. Congress	12	N. Rangasamy
Government; NDA; Seats: 20	Bharatiya Janata Party	4	A. Namassivayam
Government; NDA; Seats: 20	All India Anna Dravida Munnetra Kazhagam	1	A. Anbalagan
Government; NDA; Seats: 20	Latchiya Jananayaga Katchi	1	Jose Charles Martin
Government; NDA; Seats: 20	Independent	2	N/A
Official Opposition; DMK; Seats: 5	Dravida Munnetra Kazhagam	5	TBA
Other Opposition; TVK+ Seats: 4	Tamilaga Vettri Kazhagam	2	A. K. Sai J. Saravanan Kumar
Other Opposition; TVK+ Seats: 4	Indian National Congress	1	P. Karthikeyan
Other Opposition; TVK+ Seats: 4	Neyam Makkal Kazhagam	1	G. Nehru Kuppusamy
Others	Independent	1	N/A

== Members of Legislative Assembly ==
District	No.	Constituency	Name	Party	Alliance	Remarks
Puducherry	1	Mannadipet	A. Namassivayam	BJP	NDA	Cabinet Minister
Puducherry	2	Thirubuvanai (SC)	A. K. Sai J. Saravanan Kumar	TVK	TVK+	
Puducherry	3	Ossudu (SC)	P. Karthikeyan	INC	TVK+	Won as SPA candidate; party switched to TVK+ post-election
Puducherry	4	Mangalam	N. Rangaswamy	AINRC	NDA	Chief Minister
Puducherry	5	Villianur	B. Ravicoumar	AINRC	NDA	
Puducherry	6	Ozhukarai	K. Narayanasamy	AINRC	NDA	
Puducherry	7	Kadirkamam	Azhaganantham	Ind	Independent	
Puducherry	8	Indira Nagar	A. K. D. Arumugam	AINRC	NDA	
Puducherry	9	Thattanchavady	Ashok Anand	AINRC	NDA	Won in 2026 bypoll
Puducherry	10	Kamaraj Nagar	Jose Charles Martin	LJK	NDA	
Puducherry	11	Lawspet	V. P. Sivakolundhu	AINRC	NDA	
Puducherry	12	Kalapet	Ramesh	DMK	SPA	
Puducherry	13	Muthialpet	Vaiyapuri Manikandan	AINRC	NDA	
Puducherry	14	Raj Bhavan	Vignesh Kannan	DMK	SPA	
Puducherry	15	Oupalam	A. Anbalagan	AIADMK	NDA	
Puducherry	16	Orleampeth	G. Nehru Kuppusamy	NMK	TVK+	
Puducherry	17	Nellithope	V. Karthikeyan	DMK	SPA	
Puducherry	18	Mudaliarpet	A. Johnkumar	BJP	NDA	
Puducherry	19	Ariankuppam	Aiyappan	AINRC	NDA	
Puducherry	20	Manavely	B. Ramu	TVK	TVK+	
Puducherry	21	Embalam (SC)	E. Mohandaoss	AINRC	NDA	
Puducherry	22	Nettapakkam (SC)	Rajavelu	AINRC	NDA	
Puducherry	23	Bahour	R. Senthilkumar	DMK	SPA	
Karaikal	24	Nedungadu (SC)	V. Vigneswaran	Ind	Independent	
Karaikal	25	Thirunallar	G. N. S. Rajasekaran	BJP	NDA	
Karaikal	26	Karaikal North	P. R. N. Thirumurugan	AINRC	NDA	
Karaikal	27	Karaikal South	A. M. H. Nazeem	DMK	SPA	Leader of the Opposition
Karaikal	28	Neravy T. R. Pattinam	T. K. S. M. Meenatchisundaram	BJP	NDA	
Mahe	29	Mahe	T. Ashok Kumar	Ind	Independent	
Yanam	30	Yanam	Malladi Krishna Rao	AINRC	NDA	Cabinet Minister
N/A	31	Nominated				
N/A	32	Nominated				
N/A	33	Nominated				
