= Puducherry Pradesh Congress Committee =

- President: TBA
- Chairman: M. Vaithianathan
- Headquarters: Pondicherry, Puducherry
- Youth wing: Puducherry Youth Congress
- Women's wing: Puducherry Pradesh Mahila Congress Committee
- Ideology: Social democracy; Democratic socialism; Social liberalism; Indian nationalism; Gandhian socialism; Secularism; Progressivism
- ECI status: An Union Territorial Unit of Indian National Congress
- Alliance: Indian National Developmental Inclusive Alliance
- Seats in Rajya Sabha: 0 / 1
- Seats in Lok Sabha: 1 / 1
- Seats in Puducherry Legislative Assembly: 1 / 30

Election symbol

Puducherry Pradesh Congress Committee (or PPCC) is the affiliate of the Indian National Congress in the union territory of Puducherry. It is responsible for organizing and coordinating the party's activities and campaigns within the Union Territory, as well as selecting candidates for local, state, and national elections. It is headed by A. V. Subramanian. The committee has been active in the Union Territory's politics since its formation, and the Congress party has held power in the territory for several terms.

== List of presidents ==
| S.no | President | Portrait | Term | | Dates |
|---|---|---|---|---|---|
| 1. | P. Shanmugam | | 1975 | 19 May 2000 | |
| 2. | V. Narayanasamy | | 19 May 2000 | 11 August 2000 | 84 days |
| (1). | P. Shanmugham | | 11 August 2005 | 23 March 2008 | 2 years, 225 days |
| 3. | A. V. Subramanian | | 23 March 2008 | 9 July 2015 | 7 years, 108 days |
| 4. | A. Namassivayam | | 9 July 2015 | 4 March 2020 | 4 years, 239 days |
| (3). | A. V. Subramanian | | 4 March 2020 | 9 June 2023 | 3 years, 97 days |
| 5. | V. Vaithilingam | | 9 June 2023 | Incumbent | 3 years, 78 days |

== List of chief ministers of Pondicherry and Puducherry from Indian National Congress ==
Following is the list of the chief ministers of Puducherry from Indian National Congress:

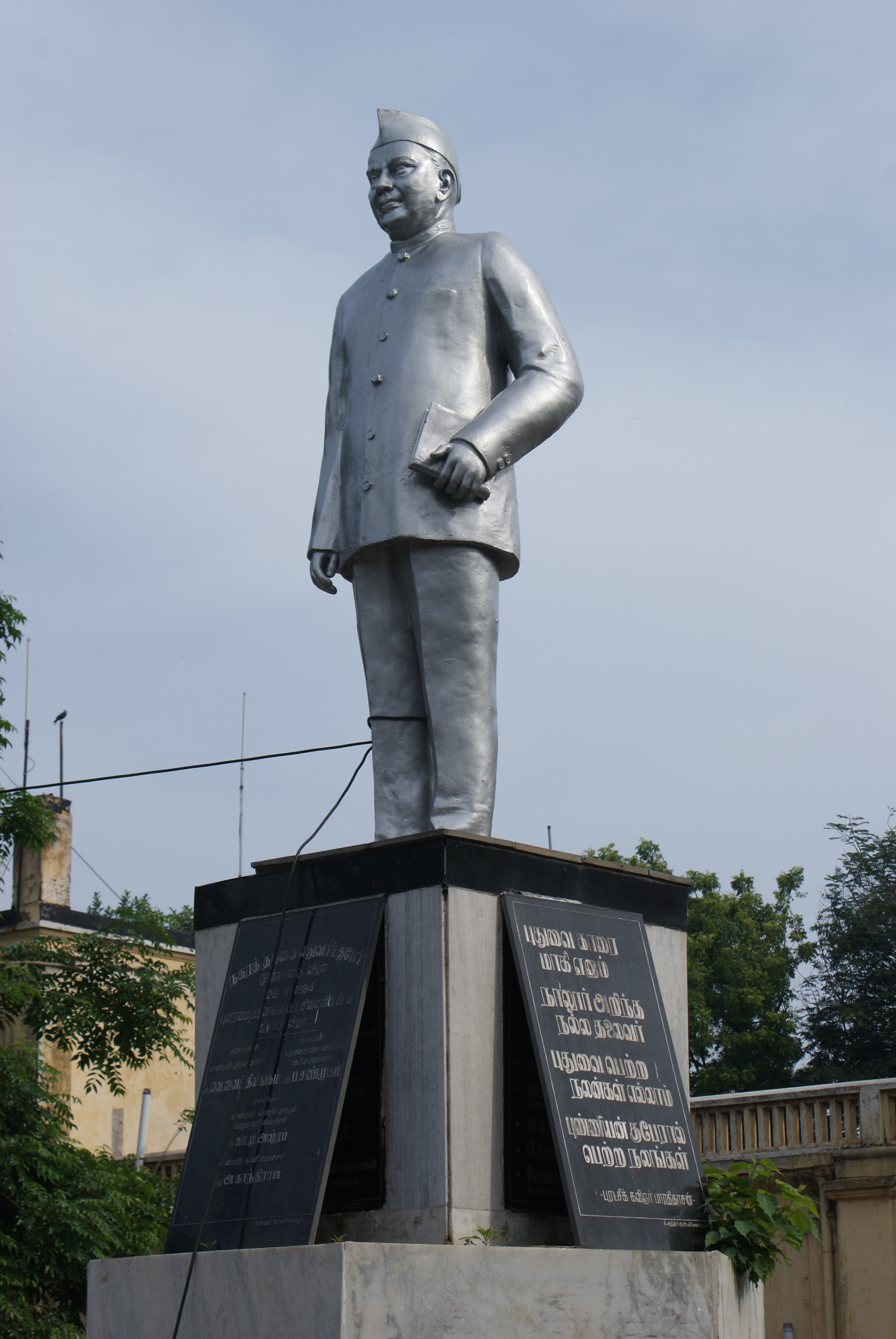
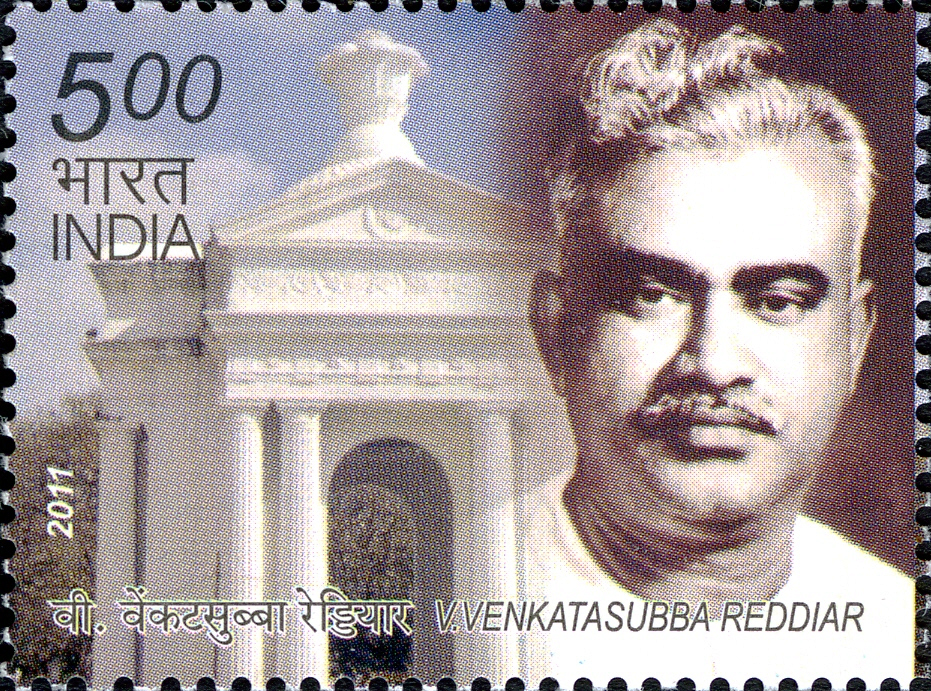
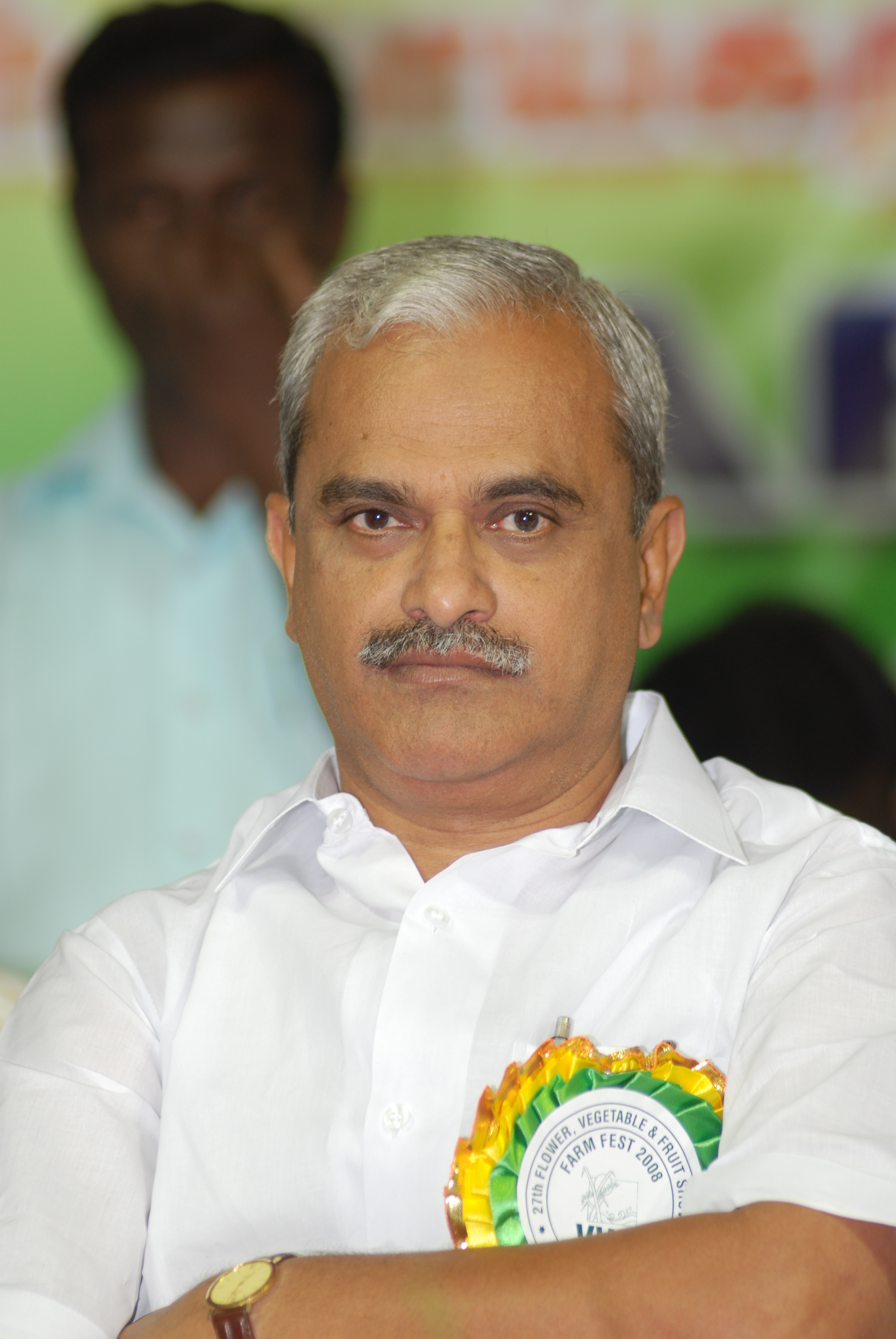
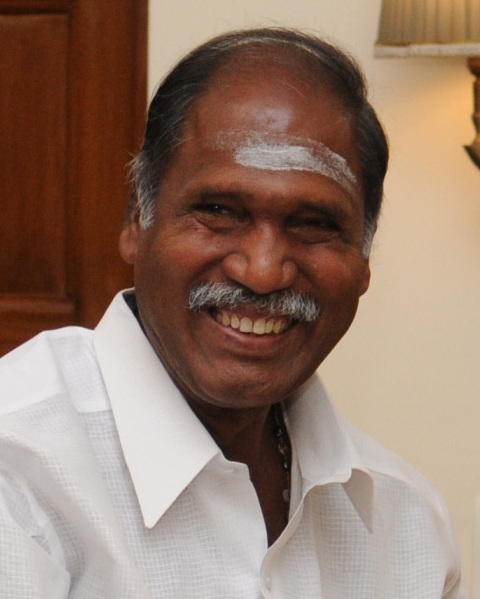
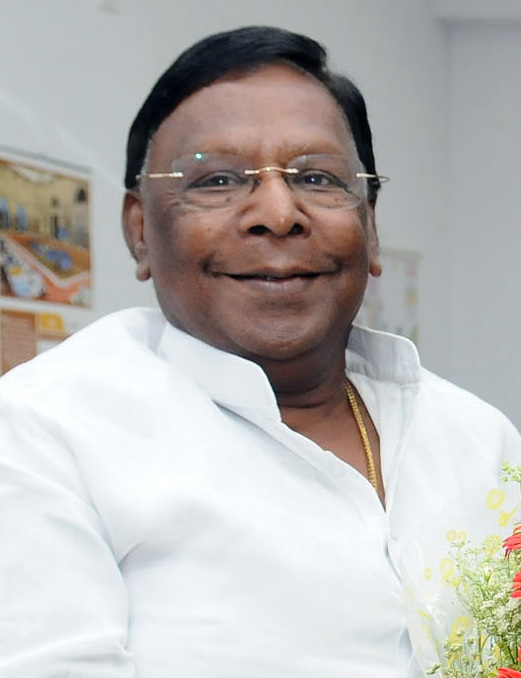
| No. | Chief Ministers | Portrait | Term in office | | | Assembly | Constituency |
| No. | Chief Ministers | Portrait | Start | End | Tenure | Assembly | Constituency |
|---|---|---|---|---|---|---|---|
| 1 | Edouard Goubert | | 1 July 1963 | 24 August 1964 | 1 year, 54 days | 1st Assembly | Mannadipet |
| 2 | V. Venkatasubba Reddiar | | 11 September 1964 | 9 April 1967 | 3 years, 59 days | 2nd Assembly | Nettapakkam |
| 2 | V. Venkatasubba Reddiar | | 6 March 1968 | 18 September 1968 | 3 years, 59 days | 2nd Assembly | Nettapakkam |
| 3 | M. O. H. Farook | | 9 April 1967 | 6 March 1968 | 5 years, 320 days | 1st Assembly | Karaikal North |
| 3 | M. O. H. Farook | | 16 March 1985 | 4 March 1990 | 5 years, 320 days | 7th Assembly | Lawspet |
| 4 | V. Vaithilingam | | 4 July 1991 | 13 May 1996 | 7 years, 201 days | 9th Assembly | Nettapakkam |
| 4 | V. Vaithilingam | | 4 September 2008 | 16 May 2011 | 7 years, 201 days | 12th Assembly | Nettapakkam |
| 5 | P. Shanmugam | | 22 March 2000 | 15 May 2001 | 1 year, 219 days | 10th Assembly | Yanam |
| 5 | P. Shanmugam | | 24 May 2001 | 26 October 2001 | 1 year, 219 days | 11th Assembly | Yanam |
| 6 | N. Rangaswamy | | 27 October 2001 | 12 May 2006 | 6 years, 313 days | 11th Assembly | Thattanchavady |
| 6 | N. Rangaswamy | | 13 May 2006 | 4 September 2008 | 6 years, 313 days | 12th Assembly | Thattanchavady |
| 7 | V. Narayanasamy | | 6 June 2016 | 18 February 2021 | 4 years, 257 days | 14th Assembly | Nellithope |

== Performance in Puducherry Legislative Assembly ==
Puducherry Legislative Assembly Elections
| Year | Assembly | Party leader | Seats contested | Seats won | Change in seats | Percentage of votes | Vote swing | Popular vote | Outcome |
|---|---|---|---|---|---|---|---|---|---|
| 2026 | 16th | V. Vaithilingam | 21 | 1 / 30 | ▼1 | 17.41% | ▲1.83 | 151,934 | Opposition |
| 2021 | 15th | V. Narayanasamy | 14 | 2 / 30 | ▼13 | 15.71% | ▼14.90 | 131,393 | Opposition |
| 2016 | 14th | A. Namassivayam | 21 | 15 / 30 | ▲8 | 30.60% | ▲5.54 | 2,44,886 | Government |
| 2011 | 13th | V. Vaithilingam | 17 | 7 / 30 | ▼3 | 26.53% | | 1,85,149 | Opposition |
| 2006 | 12th | N. Rangaswamy | 16 | 10 / 30 | ▼1 | 29.91% | | 1,69,071 | Government |
| 2001 | 10th | P. Shanmugam | 21 | 11 / 30 | ▲2 | 22.78% | | 1,08,700 | Government |
| 1996 | 10th | V. Vaithilingam | 20 | 9 / 30 | ▼6 | 25.34% | | 1,16,618 | Opposition |
| 1991 | 9th | V. Vaithilingam | 19 | 15 / 30 | ▲4 | 30.00% | | 117,289 | Government |
| 1990 | 8th | M. O. H. Farook | 17 | 11 / 30 | ▼4 | 25.04% | | 105,207 | Opposition |
| 1985 | 7th | M. O. H. Farook | | 15 / 30 | ▲5 | 32.68% | | 98,601 | Government |
| 1980 | 6th | | | 10 / 30 | ▲8 | 23.92% | | 58,680 | Opposition |
| 1977 | 5th | | | 2 / 30 | ▼5 | 16.98% | | 39,343 | Opposition |
| 1974 | 4th | | | 7 / 30 | ▼3 | 15.95% | | 34,840 | Opposition |
| 1969 | 3rd | | 30 | 10 / 30 | ▼12 | 42.62% | ▼11.68 | 78,052 | Opposition |
| 1964 | 2nd | V. Venkatasubba Reddiar | 30 | 22 / 30 | New | 54.30% | New | 91,338 | Government |

== Performance in Puducherry Lok Sabha ==
| Year | Winner / Runner-up | Seats won | Change in seats | Vote Share | Change in Vote | Outcome |
|---|---|---|---|---|---|---|
| 1967 | Thirumudi N. Sethuraman | 1 / 1 | ▲ New | 39.83% | ▲ New | Government |
| 1971 | Mohan Kumaramangalam | Government | | | | |
| 1977 | Mohan Kumaramangalam | 1 / 1 | ▲1 | 66.27% | ▲26.44 | Government |
| 1980 | P. Shanmugam | 1 / 1 | Steady | 66.45% | ▲0.18 | Government |
| 1984 | P. Shanmugam | 1 / 1 | Steady | 58.86% | ▼7.59 | Government |
| 1989 | P. Shanmugam | 1 / 1 | Steady | 50.47% | ▼8.39 | Opposition |
| 1991 | M. O. H. Farook | 1 / 1 | Steady | 53.07% | ▲2.60 | Government |
| 1996 | M. O. H. Farook | 1 / 1 | Steady | 39.97% | ▼13.10 | Opposition |
| 1998 | P. Shanmugam | 0 / 1 | ▼1 | 32.12% | ▼7.85 | Opposition |
| 1999 | M. O. H. Farook | 1 / 1 | ▲1 | 37.17% | ▲5.05 | Opposition |
| 2004 | Did not Contest | | | | | Government |
| 2009 | V. Narayanasamy | 1 / 1 | ▲1 | 49.41% | ▲12.24 | Government |
| 2014 | V. Narayanasamy | 0 / 1 | ▼1 | 26.35% | ▼23.06 | Opposition |
| 2019 | V. Vaithilingam | 1 / 1 | ▲1 | 56.27% | ▲29.92 | Opposition |
| 2024 | V. Vaithilingam | 1 / 1 | Steady | 52.73% | ▼3.54 | Opposition |

== List of Rajya Sabha Members from Puducherry Congress ==
| Name | Date of | | Total Term | Vacation Date/Reason |
| Name | Appointment | Retirement | Total Term | Vacation Date/Reason |
|---|---|---|---|---|
| P. Kannan | 7 October 2009 | 6 October 2015 | 1 | Retirement |
| V. Narayanasamy | 7 October 2003 | 6 October 2009 | 3 | Elected to LS on 16 May 2009 |
| V. Narayanasamy | 5 August 1991 | 4 August 1997 | 2 | Retirement |
| V. Narayanasamy | 5 August 1985 | 4 August 1991 | 1 | Retirement |
| P. Abraham | 7 August 1963 | 6 August 1969 | 1 | Retirement |

== See also ==
- Congress Working Committee
- All India Congress Committee
- Pradesh Congress Committee
