= Fifth Rangaswamy ministry =

Government of Puducherry, India

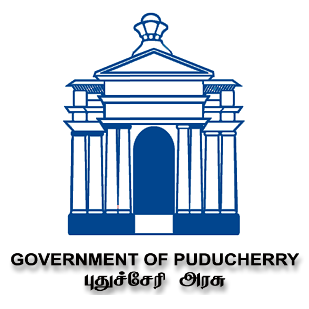
- 20th Ministry of Puducherry
- 2026-
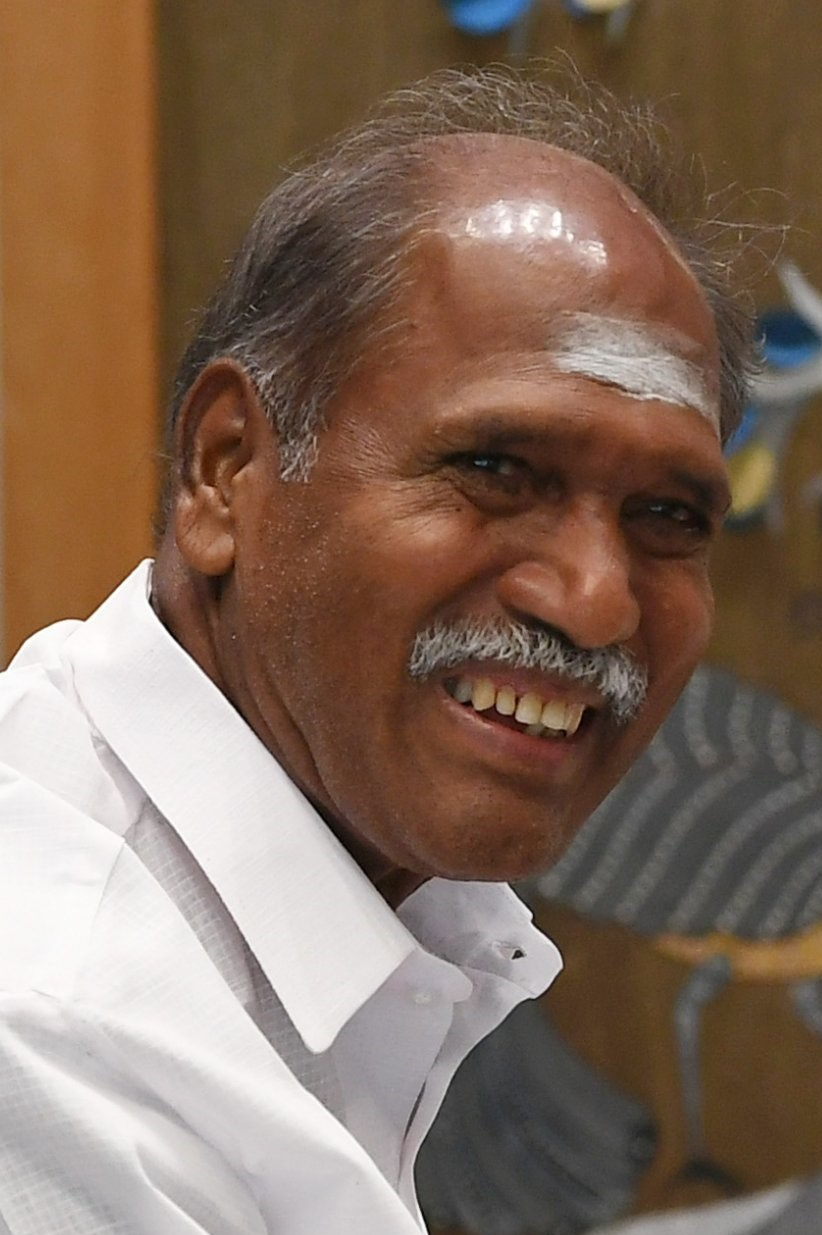
- N. Rangaswamy
- Date established: 13 May 2026

Leadership and composition
- Lt. Governor: Kuniyil Kailashnathan
- Chief Minister: N. Rangaswamy
- No. of ministers: 6
- Total no. of members: 6
- Member parties: AINRC; BJP
- Status in legislature: Majority (Coalition)
- Opposition party: DMK

Formation and history
- Election: 2026
- Legislature term: 2026-
- Predecessor: Fourth Rangaswamy ministry

After the All India N.R. Congress-led National Democratic Alliance won a majority in the 2026 Puducherry Legislative Assembly election, N. Rangaswamy was sworn in as Chief Minister of Puducherry for the fifth time on 13 May 2026.

== List of ministers ==
S.No	Name	Designation	Constituency	Department	Party	From	To
Chief Minister
1	N. Rangaswamy	Chief Minister	Mangalam	Confidential and Cabinet Department; Planning and Finance; Personnel and Administrative Reforms; Cooperation; Revenue and Excise; General Administration; Health and Family Welfare; Hindu Religious Institutions; Wakf Board; Local Administration; Urban Basic Services; Transport; Science, Technology and Environment; Town and Country Planning; Information and Publicity; Fire Services; Other subjects which are not allocated to any other Ministers	AINRC	13 May 2026	Incumbent
Cabinet Ministers
2	A. Namassivayam	Hon'ble Home Minister	Mannadipet	Home; Animal Husbandry & Animal Welfare; Forest & Wild Life; Electricity; Education including Collegiate Education; Law	BJP	13 May 2026	Incumbent
3	Malladi Krishna Rao	Hon'ble Public Works Minister	Yanam	Public Works; Tourism and Civil Aviation; Fisheries & Fishermen Welfare; Port; Industries & Commerce; Labour & Employment	AINRC	13 May 2026	Incumbent
4	G. N. S. Rajasekaran	Hon'ble Agriculture Minister	Thirunallar	Agriculture & Formers Welfare; Sports & Youth Affairs; DRDA; Community Development; Rural Development; Sainik Welfare	BJP	17 June 2026	Incumbent
5	P. Rajavelu	Hon'ble Adi Dravidar Welfare Minister	Nettapakkam	Adi Dravidar Welfare; Art & Culture; Housing; Information Technology; Economics & Statistics; Stationery & Printing	AINRC	17 June 2026	Incumbent
6	V. P. Sivakolundhu	Hon'ble Civil Supplies & Consumer Affairs Minister	Lawspet	Civil Supplies & Consumer Affairs; Social Welfare; Backward Class Welfare; Women & Child Development; Minority Affairs	AINRC	17 June 2026	Incumbent

== 2026 Puducherry government formation and administrative delays ==
The 2026 Puducherry political crisis refers to a period of administrative and political uncertainty in the Union Territory of Puducherry following the 2026 Puducherry Legislative Assembly election. Despite the formation of a National Democratic Alliance (NDA) government under Chief Minister N. Rangasamy of the All India N.R. Congress (AINRC), the government remained incomplete for over two months after the swearing-in.

=== Background ===
The 2026 Puducherry Legislative Assembly election was held on 6 May 2026, with results declared on 4 May 2026. The NDA secured a majority, winning 18 out of 30 seats, with AINRC winning 12 seats, the Bharatiya Janata Party (BJP) winning 4 seats, LJK winning 1 seat, and AIADMK winning 1 seat. Chief Minister N. Rangasamy was sworn in on 13 May 2026, along with two ministers. Three additional ministers were sworn in on 17 June 2026.

=== Issues ===
As of July 2026, the following issues remained unresolved:

Portfolio allocation: No portfolios had been assigned to any of the five ministers, leaving the Chief Minister in sole charge of all departments. Critics described this as a "nominal cabinet" that undermined the principle of collective responsibility.

Speaker election: The Legislative Assembly continued to function under a Pro tem Speaker, with no date announced for the election of a permanent Speaker.

Budget presentation: The presentation of the full budget for the fiscal year 2026–27 was delayed. While the Central Government approved an annual outlay of ₹14,300 crore on 13 July 2026, the government continued to operate on a vote-on-account of ₹5,396 crore presented in February 2026.

=== Reactions ===
Opposition: Dravida Munnetra Kazhagam (DMK) MLAs staged a sit-in protest on 2 July 2026, demanding an immediate Speaker election and portfolio allocation. Former MP M. Ramadass criticised the Chief Minister for creating "administrative paralysis."

BJP response: BJP leaders stated that as the junior partner in the alliance, the party was not responsible for the delay and that the Chief Minister should clarify the matter.

AINRC response: Chief Minister Rangasamy did not comment publicly on the delays and had reportedly not held discussions with BJP leaders in the preceding weeks.

Nearly 3 months after the election results—and over 1.5 months after the full Cabinet was sworn in—ending weeks of speculation and delay, portfolios were finally allotted to ministers on August 5, 2026.

== Ministers by political party ==
Party	Count of ministers
All India N.R. Congress	4
Bharatiya Janata Party	2
Total	6

== Demographics ==
Ministers by district (Note: Based on the location of the assembly constituency from which the corresponding member was elected from.)
#	District	Ministers	Name
1	Puducherry	4	N. Rangaswamy (Chief Minister); A. Namassivayam; P. Rajavelu; V. P. Sivakolundhu
2	Karaikal	1	G. N. S. Rajasekaran
3	Mahe	0	
4	Yanam	1	Malladi Krishna Rao
