= 2026 Puducherry Legislative Assembly election =

Election to the legislative assembly of Puducherry

- 9 April 2026

30 (Note: Three members are nominated by the Lieutenant Governor.) of 33 seats in the Puducherry Legislative Assembly 17 seats needed for a majority
- Opinion polls
- Registered: 9,50,311 (▼6.01%)
- Turnout: 89.87% (▲6.43 pp)
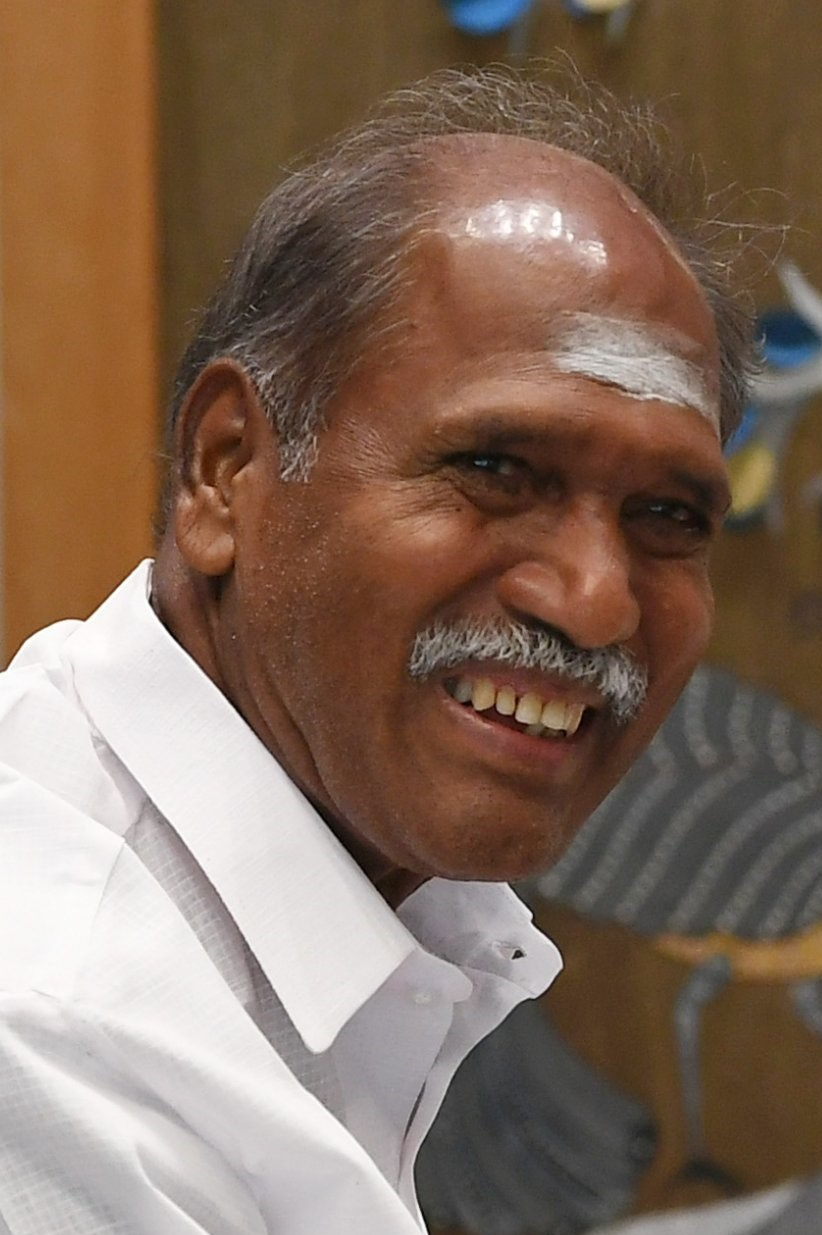

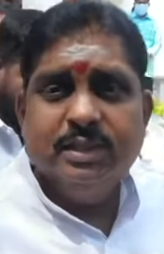
	Majority party	Minority party	Third party
Leader	N. Rangaswamy	R. Siva	A. Namassivayam
Party	AINRC	DMK	BJP
Alliance	AINRC+	DMK+	AINRC+
Leader since	2011	2011	2021
Leader's seat	Mangalam (won; retained); Thattanchavady (won; vacated)	Villianur (Lost)	Mannadipet (won)
Last election	25.85%, 10 seats	18.51%, 6 seats	6 seats
Seats before	10	6	6
Seats won	12	5	4
Seat change	▲2	▼1	▼2
Popular vote	200,292	119,036	105,583
Percentage	23.12%	13.74%	12.15%
Swing	▼2.73 pp	▼4.79 pp	▼1.47 pp
Alliance seats	18	6	18
Alliance seat change	▲2	▼2	▲2
Alliance popular vote	335,177	272,202	335,177
Alliance percentage	38.7%	31.42%	38.7%

Chief Minister before election
N. Rangaswamy
AINRC
Elected Chief Minister
N. Rangaswamy
AINRC

2026 Puducherry Legislative Assembly elections were held on 9 April 2026 to elect all the 30 members of the Puducherry Legislative Assembly. The votes were counted and the results were declared on 4 May 2026 by the Election Commission of India.

The election recorded a voter turnout of 89.87%, the highest ever for an assembly election in the union territory.

The National Democratic Alliance won a simple majority in the elections with an increased majority and N. Rangaswamy of the All India N. R. Congress was sworn in as the chief minister for the fifth time, with the alliance winning 18 of the 30 elected seats in the union territory.

The opposition Secular Progressive Alliance won only 6 seats with incumbent Leader of Opposition and Dravida Munnetra Kazhagam leader R. Siva losing his own seat. The Indian National Congress was routed as it won only one seat, with its state chief and MP V. Vaithilingam losing his Election deposit and finishing fourth.

== Background ==
Elections to a Legislative Assembly in India are usually held once in five years, and the members of the legislative assembly are directly elected to serve five year terms from single-member constituencies.

The tenure of Puducherry Legislative Assembly is scheduled to end on 15 June 2026. In the previous assembly elections held in April 2021, the All India N.R. Congress-led National Democratic Alliance formed the state government after winning 16 out of 30 seats in the assembly, with N. Rangaswamy sworn in as the Chief Minister.

In the later part of 2025, the Election Commission of India conducted a Special Intensive Revision after 24 years, to revise the electoral rolls.

== Schedule ==
The Election Commission of India announced the schedule for the election on 15 March 2026.

Event	Date
Date for Nomination	16 March 2026
Last date for filing nominations	23 March 2026
Scrutiny of nominations	24 March 2026
Last date for withdrawal of nomination	26 March 2026
Polling	9 April 2026
Counting of votes	4 May 2026
Deadline for the completion of election process	6 May 2026

== Parties and alliances ==
=== AINRC-led Alliance ===
AINRC-led Alliance seat sharing map

The seat sharing for the National Democratic Alliance was finalised on 20 March 2026.

AINRC-led Alliance
Party	Flag	Symbol	Leader	Seats
All India N. R. Congress			N. Rangasamy	16
Bharatiya Janata Party			V. P. Ramalingame	10
All India Anna Dravida Munnetra Kazhagam			A. Anbalagan	2
Latchiya Jananayaka Katchi			Jose Charles Martin	2
Total				30

=== Secular Progressive Alliance ===
Secular Progressive Alliance seat sharing map

As per the seat-sharing agreement finalised on 23 March 2026, the Indian National Congress and the Dravida Munnetra Kazhagam (DMK) agreed to contest in 17 and 13 seats respectively. However, the Congress had already fielded candidates in five seats allocated to the DMK, which resulted in friendly contests between the two parties in these five constituencies.

The DMK allocated one seat from its quota to the Viduthalai Chiruthaigal Katchi (VCK). However, the VCK announced its exit from the alliance on 24 March 2026 citing seat-sharing disagreements. However, on 6 April, the VCK announced that apart from the Oulgret constituency allocated to it, it will support the coalition candidates in the other three seats, where it had already fielded candidates.

Secular Progressive Alliance
Party	Flag	Symbol	Leader	Seats
Indian National Congress			V. Vaithilingam	21
Dravida Munnetra Kazhagam			R. Siva	13
Viduthalai Chiruthaigal Katchi			Deva Pozhilan	4
Total				30+8 (Note: Friendly contests in eight constituencies.)

=== TVK–led Alliance ===
On 22 March 2026, Tamilaga Vettri Kazhagam (TVK) announced its candidates for 30 constituencies in Puducherry. Subsequently, Neyam Makkal Kazhagam, led by G. Nehru Kuppusamy, joined the TVK-led Alliance and was allocated two seats.

TVK-led Alliance
Party	Flag	Symbol	Leader	Seats
Tamilaga Vettri Kazhagam			Vijay	28
Neyam Makkal Kazhagam			G. Nehru Kuppusamy	2
Total				30

=== SNMMK–AIPTMMK Alliance ===
On 20 March 2026, the S. Ramadoss-led faction of the Pattali Makkal Katchi, formed an alliance with All India Puratchi Thalaivar Makkal Munnetra Kazhagam (AIPTMMK), led by V. K. Sasikala, for the assembly elections in Puducherry. On 25 March 2026, a seat-sharing agreement was signed between G. Sathiyamoorthy of Sengol Needhi Makkal Munnetra Kazhagam and Sasikala of AIPTMMK for the elections.

SNMMK–AIPTMMK Alliance
Party	Flag	Symbol	Leader	Seats
Sengol Needhi Makkal Munnetra Kazhagam			Sathiyamurthy	10
All India Puratchi Thalaivar Makkal Munnetra Kazhagam			V. K. Sasikala	4
Total				14

=== Others ===
On 7 March 2026, Naam Tamilar Katchi was the first party to announce its candidates for the elections, and announced its intention to contest in 28 of the 30 constituencies in the union territory. The Communist Party of India (Marxist) and Communist Party of India, which are part of the Secular Progressive Alliance in Tamil Nadu, withdrew from the alliance and independently fielded candidates in four and two constituencies respectively.

Party	Flag	Symbol	Leader	Seats
Naam Tamilar Katchi			Seeman	28
Communist Party of India (Marxist)			S. Ramachandran	4
Communist Party of India			A. M. Saleem	2

== Candidates ==
District	#	Constituency	AINRC+		SPA		TVK+	
District	#	Constituency	Party	Candidate	Party	Candidate (Note: The constituent parties of the Secular Progressive Alliance are engaged in a friendly fight in eight constituencies. This lists only the officially recognised candidates in the respective seats allocated to the constituent parties as per the seat sharing agreement between them.)	Party	Candidate
Puducherry	1	Mannadipet	BJP	A. Namassivayam	INC	T. P. R. Selvame	TVK	K. Bharathithasan
Puducherry	2	Thirubuvanai (SC)	AINRC	B. Kobiga	DMK	P. Angalane	TVK	A. K. Sai J. Saravanan Kumar
Puducherry	3	Ossudu (SC)	BJP	E. Theeppainthan	INC	P. Karthikeyan	TVK	S. Saraganabava
Puducherry	4	Mangalam	AINRC	N. Rangasamy	DMK	S. S. Rangan	TVK	M. K. Sathia Manikkavasagane
Puducherry	5	Villianur	AINRC	Ravikumar	DMK	R. Siva	TVK	R. Ramesh
Puducherry	6	Ozhukarai	AINRC	K. Narayanasamy	VCK	Selva. Pushpalatha	TVK	Sasibalan
Puducherry	7	Kadirgamam	AINRC	K. S. P. Ramesh	DMK	P. Vadivelu	TVK	Jayanthi Rajavelu
Puducherry	8	Indira Nagar	AINRC	A. K. D. Arumugam	INC	N. Rajakumar	TVK	S. Mourougane
Puducherry	9	Thattanchavady	AINRC	N. Rangasamy	INC	V. Vaithilingam	NMK	E. Vinayagam
Puducherry	10	Kamaraj Nagar	LJK	Jose Charles Martin	INC	P. K. Devadoss	TVK	Suman
Puducherry	11	Lawspet	AINRC	V. P. Sivakolundhu	INC	M. Vaithianathan	TVK	V. Saminathan
Puducherry	12	Kalapet	BJP	P. M. L. Kalyanasundaram	DMK	A. Senthil Ramesh	TVK	D. Sasikumar
Puducherry	13	Muthialpet	AINRC	Vaiyapuri Manikandan	INC	M. Rajendran	TVK	J. Prakash Kumar
Puducherry	14	Raj Bhavan	BJP	V. P. Ramalingame	DMK	Vignesh Kannan	TVK	V. J. Chandran
Puducherry	15	Oupalam	AIADMK	A. Anbalagan	DMK	Annibal Kennedy	TVK	S. Siva
Puducherry	16	Orleampeth	AIADMK	A. Gandhi	DMK	S. Gopal	NMK	G. Nehru Kuppusamy
Puducherry	17	Nellithope	LJK	A. Jayakumar	DMK	V. Karthikeyan	TVK	S. Vigneshwaran
Puducherry	18	Mudaliarpet	BJP	A. Johnkumar	DMK	L. Sambath	TVK	N. Manibalan
Puducherry	19	Ariankuppam	AINRC	C. Aiyappan	INC	D. Vijayalakshmy	TVK	Kumaravelu
Puducherry	20	Manavely	BJP	Embalam R. Selvam	INC	R. K. R. Anantharaman	TVK	B. Ramu
Puducherry	21	Embalam (SC)	AINRC	Mohamdaoss	INC	M. Kandaswamy	TVK	V. Tamilselvan
Puducherry	22	Nettapakkam (SC)	AINRC	Rajavelu	INC	P. Sadasivam	TVK	L. Periasamy
Puducherry	23	Bahour	AINRC	T. Thiagarajan	DMK	R. Senthilkumar	TVK	N. Dhanavelou
Karaikal	24	Nedungadu (SC)	AINRC	Chandira Priyanga	INC	Dinesh Kumar	TVK	U. Kamaraj
Karaikal	25	Thirunallar	BJP	G. N. S. Rajasekaran	INC	R. Kamalakannan	TVK	A. Raja Mohamed
Karaikal	26	Karaikal North	AINRC	P. R. N. Thirumurugan	INC	A. M. Ranjith	TVK	A. Vengadesh
Karaikal	27	Karaikal South	BJP	M. Arulmurugan	DMK	A. M. H. Nazeem	TVK	K. A. U. Assana
Karaikal	28	Neravy T. R. Pattinam	BJP	T. K. S. M. Meenatchisundaram	DMK	M. Nagathiyagarajan	TVK	Pranadarti Gareswaran
Mahe	29	Mahe	BJP	A. Dineshan	INC	Ramesh Parambath	TVK	Prijesh M.
Yanam	30	Yanam	AINRC	Malladi Krishna Rao	INC	Gollapalli Srinivas Ashok	TVK	Thota Raju

== Surveys and polls ==
=== Exit polls ===
Seat projections
Polling agency	Date published					Lead
Polling agency	Date published	AINRC+	SPA	TVK+	Others	Lead
Axis My India	29 April 2026	16-20	6-8	2-4	1-3	8-14
Kamakhya Analytics	29 April 2026	17-24	4-7	1-7	0-1	10-20
People's Pulse	29 April 2026	16-19	10-12	1-3	1-2	4-9
Praja Poll	29 April 2026	19-25	6-10	1-6	0	9-19
JVC	29 April 2026	15-17	11-13	1-2	0-1	2-6

== Voting ==
According to the Election Commission of India, 9,50,311 voters were eligible to vote in the assembly elections in Puducherry. This includes 4,46,361 male, 5,03,810 female, and 140 third gender voters. The polling was held on 9 April 2026 and the election recorded a voter turnout of 89.87%, the highest ever for an assembly election in the union territory.

== Results ==
=== By alliance or party ===
Alliance/ Party		Popular vote			Seats		
Alliance/ Party		Votes	%	±pp	Contested	Won	+/-
AINRC+	AINRC	200,292	23.12	▼2.73	16	12	▲2
AINRC+	BJP	105,583	12.19	▼1.47	10	4	▼2
AINRC+	LJK	19,903	2.30	New entry	2	1	New entry
AINRC+	ADMK	9,399	1.09	▼3.05	2	1	▲1
AINRC+	Total	335,177	38.70	Steady	30	18	▲2
SPA	DMK	119,036	13.74	▼4.77	13	5	▼1
SPA	INC	151,934	17.54	▲1.83	22	1	▼1
SPA	VCK	1,232	0.14	▼0.53	2	0	Steady
SPA	Total	272,202	31.42	Steady	30	6	▼2
TVK+	TVK	144,817	16.72	New entry	28	2	New entry
TVK+	NMK	15,543	1.79	New entry	2	1	New entry
TVK+	Total	160,360	18.51	New entry	30	3	New entry
Others		2,754	0.32	Steady	30	0	Steady
IND		75,185	8.68	▼4	117	3	▼3
NOTA		6,633	0.77	▼0.52			
Total		866,139	100%	—	294	30	—

=== By district ===
District	Seats				
District	Seats	NDA	INDIA	TVK+	IND
Puducherry	23	14	5	3	1
Karaikal	5	3	1	—N/a	1
Mahe	1	—N/a	—N/a	—N/a	1
Yanam	1	1	—N/a	—N/a	—N/a
Total	30	18	6	3	3

=== By constituency ===
District	Constituency		Winner				Runner Up				Margin	%
District	#	Name	Candidate	Party	Votes	%	Candidate	Party	Votes	%	Margin	%
Puducherry	1	Mannadipet	A. Namassivayam	BJP	15,918	53.96	T. P. R. Selvame	INC	9,808	33.25	6,110	20.71
Puducherry	2	Thirubuvanai (SC)	Sai Saravanan Kumar	TVK	9,740	32.15	B. Kobiga	AINRC	9,039	29.83	701	2.32
Puducherry	3	Ossudu (SC)	P. Karthikeyan	INC	15,400	49.20	E. Theeppainthan	BJP	11,382	36.36	4,018	12.84
Puducherry	4	Mangalam	N. Rangaswamy	AINRC	17,917	50.61	S. S. Rangan	DMK	10,867	30.69	7,050	19.92
Puducherry	5	Villianur	B. Ravicoumar	AINRC	16,970	43.13	R. Siva	DMK	15,000	38.12	1,970	5.01
Puducherry	6	Ozhukarai	K. Narayanasamy	AINRC	12,635	35.20	Sasibalan	TVK	8,401	23.41	4,234	11.79
Puducherry	7	Kadirkamam	Azhaganantham	IND	14,633	51.35	K. S. P. Ramesh	AINRC	7,629	26.77	7,004	24.58
Puducherry	8	Indira Nagar	A. K. D. Arumugam	AINRC	12,640	42.13	S. S. Rangan	DMK	12,056	40.19	584	1.94
Puducherry	9	Thattanchavady	N. Rangaswamy	AINRC	10,024	42.51	E. Vinayagam	NMK	5,583	23.68	4,441	18.83
Puducherry	10	Kamaraj Nagar	Jose Charles Martin	LJK	16,592	53.14	P. K. Devadoss	INC	6,387	20.45	10,205	32.69
Puducherry	11	Lawspet	V. P. Sivakolundhu	AINRC	10,578	39.52	M. Vaithianathan	INC	9,161	34.23	1,417	5.29
Puducherry	12	Kalapet	Ramesh	DMK	12,069	38.26	P. M. L. Kalyanasundaram	BJP	11,622	36.84	447	1.42
Puducherry	13	Muthialpet	Vaiyapuri Manikandan	AINRC	8,382	35.58	M. Rajendran	INC	7,430	31.54	952	4.04
Puducherry	14	Raj Bhavan	Vignesh Kannan	DMK	7,304	39.03	V. P. Ramalingame	BJP	7,017	37.49	287	1.54
Puducherry	15	Oupalam	A. Anbalagan	ADMK	9,099	39.51	S. Siva	TVK	8,073	35.05	1,026	4.46
Puducherry	16	Orleampeth	G. Nehru Kuppusamy	NMK	9,960	50.83	S. Gopal	DMK	8,759	44.70	1,201	6.13
Puducherry	17	Nellithope	V. Cartigueyane	DMK	8,226	33.21	Omsakthisekar	IND	7,376	29.78	850	3.43
Puducherry	18	Mudaliarpet	A. Johnkumar	BJP	12,945	41.49	L. Sambath	DMK	10,574	33.89	2,371	7.60
Puducherry	19	Ariankuppam	Aiyappan	AINRC	14,210	41.18	D. Vijayalakshmy	INC	13,607	39.43	603	1.75
Puducherry	20	Manavely	B. Ramu	TVK	13,822	42.68	Embalam R. Selvam	BJP	10,729	33.13	3,093	9.55
Puducherry	21	Embalam (SC)	E. Mohandoss	AINRC	16,017	50.78	M. Kandaswamy	INC	11,956	37.91	4,061	12.87
Puducherry	22	Nettapakkam (SC)	Rajavelu	AINRC	13,665	47.58	G. Anbarasan	INC	6,976	24.29	6,689	23.29
Puducherry	23	Bahour	R. Senthilkumar	DMK	10,520	38.32	T. Thiagarajan	AINRC	8,123	29.59	2,397	8.73
Karaikal	24	Nedungadu (SC)	V. Vigneswaran	IND	14,368	50.54	Chandira Priyanga	AINRC	9,869	34.71	4,499	15.63
Karaikal	25	Thirunallar	G. N. S. Rajasekaran	BJP	16,829	60.18	R. Kamalakannan	INC	7,303	26.11	9,526	34.07
Karaikal	26	Karaikal North	P. R. N. Thirumurugan	AINRC	12,731	43.59	A. M. Ranjith	INC	10,078	34.50	2,653	9.09
Karaikal	27	Karaikal South	A. M. H. Nazeem	DMK	12,453	49.15	A. V. S. Sakthivel Prabu	INC	6,681	26.18	5,862	22.97
Karaikal	28	Neravy T. R. Pattinam	Meenatchisundaram	BJP	10,818	40.75	M. Nagathiyagarajan	DMK	8,800	33.15	2,018	7.60
Mahé	29	Mahe	T. Ashok Kumar	IND	8,375	35.19	Ramesh Parambath	INC	7,260	30.50	1,115	4.69
Yanam	30	Yanam	Malladi Krishna Rao	AINRC	19,863	55.44	Gollapalli Srinivas Ashok	INC	15,295	42.69	4,568	12.75

== By-elections ==
Date	S.No	Constituency	MLA before election	Party before election	Reason	Elected MLA	Party after election
6 October 2026	9	Thattanchavady	N. Rangaswamy	All India N. R. Congress	(Note: N. Rangaswamy contested two constituencies simultaneously during the election and won both. Subsequently, He vacated the Thattanchavady seat and retained the Mangalam seat, as per Section 70 of the Representation of the People Act, 1951, which forbids any MLA or MP from representing two constituencies for more than 14 days and stipulates that they must resign from one of the two seats within the said time.)	Ashok Anand	All India N. R. Congress
