= M. Sivasankar =

Indian politician

Member of Puducherry Legislative Assembly
- In office 2 May 2021 – Incumbent
- Preceded by: M. N. R. Balan
- Constituency: Ozhukarai

Personal details
- Party: Indian National Congress
- Other political affiliations: All India Anna Dravida Munnetra Kazhagam
- Education: Master of Commerce; Bachelor of Education
- Alma mater: Annamalai University
- Profession: Agriculture and Businessman

M. Sivasankar is a politician from India. He was elected as a member of the Puducherry Legislative Assembly from Ozhukarai (constituency). He defeated N. G. Pannir Selvam of All India N.R. Congress by 819 votes in 2021 Puducherry Assembly election.
