= Ozhukarai Assembly constituency =

Constituency of the Puducherry legislative assembly in India

Coordinates: 11.950°N 79.710°E

Oulgaret
- Constituency No. 6 for the Puducherry Legislative Assembly
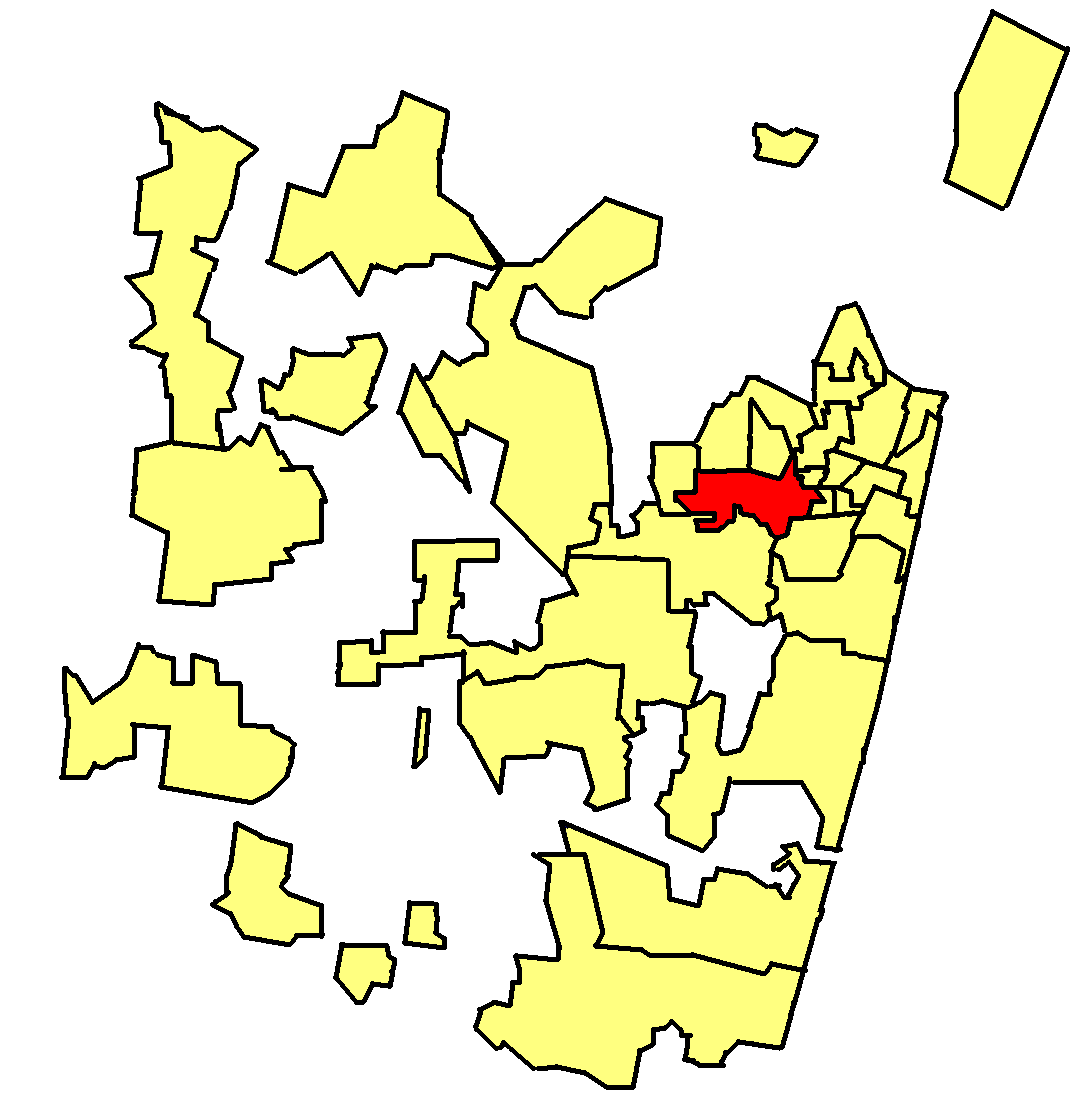

Constituency details
- Country: India
- Region: South India
- Union Territory: Puducherry
- District: Puducherry
- Lok Sabha constituency: Puducherry
- Established: 1974
- Total electors: 41,890
- Reservation: None

Member of Legislative Assembly
- 16th Puducherry Legislative Assembly
- Incumbent M. Sivasankar
- Party: INC
- Alliance: SPA
- Elected year: 2001

Ozhukarai is a legislative assembly constituency in the Union territory of Puducherry in India. Ozhukarai Assembly constituency is part of Puducherry Lok Sabha constituency.

== Members of Legislative Assembly ==
| Year | Member | Party |
|---|---|---|
| 1977 | G. Perumal Raja | Dravida Munnetra Kazhagam |
| 1980 | G. Perumal Raja | Dravida Munnetra Kazhagam |
| 1985 | R. Somasundaram | All India Anna Dravida Munnetra Kazhagam |
| 1990 | M. Rasan | Dravida Munnetra Kazhagam |
| 1991 | K. Natarajan | All India Anna Dravida Munnetra Kazhagam |
| 1996 | K. Natarajan | All India Anna Dravida Munnetra Kazhagam |
| 2001 | A. Namassivayam | Tamil Maanila Congress |
| 2006 | A. Namassivayam | Indian National Congress |
| 2011 | N. G. Pannir Selvam | All India N.R. Congress |
| 2016 | M. N. R. Balan | Indian National Congress |
| 2021 | M. Sivasankar | Independent |
| 2026 | K. Narayanasamy | All India N.R. Congress |

== Election results ==
Vote share of winning candidates
| 2021 | 36.50% |
| 2016 | 47.66% |
| 2011 | 37.77% |
| 2006 | 48.10% |
| 2001 | 45.49% |
| 1996 | 41.10% |
| 1991 | 56.82% |
| 1990 | 54.08% |
| 1985 | 53.78% |
| 1980 | 65.98% |
| 1977 | 31.68% |
| 1974 | 39.44% |

=== 2026 ===
2026 Puducherry Legislative Assembly election: Ozhukarai
| Party | Candidate | Votes | % | ±% |
|---|---|---|---|---|
| AINRC | K. Narayanasamy | 12,635 | 35.20 | |
| TVK | Sasibalan | 8,401 | 23.41 | |
| IND | N. Saravanan | 7,446 | 20.74 | |
| INC | M. Sivasankar | 3,709 | 10.33 | |
| VCK | Pushpalatha | 1,142 | 3.18 | |
| IND | R. Arulsezhian | 607 | 1.69 | |
| CPI | Nara. Kalainathan | 402 | 1.12 | |
| IND | V. Prabadevi | 374 | 1.04 | |
| NOTA | None of the above | 331 | 0.92 | |
| IND | R. Ravitchandirane | 198 | 0.55 | |
| AIPTMMK | M. Lavanya | 103 | 0.29 | |
| IND | J. Vinayagam | 48 | 0.13 | |
| PMK | Mangayararasi | 41 | 0.11 | |
| IND | S. Murugan | 38 | 0.11 | |
| Majority | | 4,234 | 11.79 | |
| Turnout | | 35,893 | 89.11 | |
| AINRC gain from Independent | | Swing | | |

=== Assembly Election 2021 ===
2021 Puducherry Legislative Assembly election: Ozhukarai
| Party | Candidate | Votes | % | ±% |
|---|---|---|---|---|
| Independent | M. Sivasankar | 11,940 | 36.50% | |
| AINRC | N. G. Pannir Selvam | 11,121 | 34.00% | |
| VCK | Angalane Deva Pozhilan | 5,633 | 17.22% | |
| MNM | R. Pazhanivelan | 1,185 | 3.62% | |
| NOTA | Nota | 444 | 1.36% | −0.52% |
| Independent | Sivasankaran | 282 | 0.86% | |
| Independent | N. Jeevanandam | 188 | 0.57% | |
| CPI(ML)L | S. Mothilal | 158 | 0.48% | |
| Amma Makkal Munnettra Kazagam | Ejoumale | 147 | 0.45% | |
| Margin of victory | | 819 | 2.50% | −20.53% |
| Turnout | | 32,710 | 77.83% | −4.73% |
| Registered electors | | 42,027 | | 12.47% |
| Independent gain from INC | | Swing | -11.16% | |

=== Assembly Election 2016 ===
2016 Puducherry Legislative Assembly election: Ozhukarai
| Party | Candidate | Votes | % | ±% |
|---|---|---|---|---|
| INC | M. N. R. Balan | 14,703 | 47.66% | |
| AINRC | N. G. Pannir Selvam | 7,596 | 24.62% | |
| AIADMK | M. Sivasankar | 3,958 | 12.83% | |
| Independent | T. Sampathkumar | 1,406 | 4.56% | |
| CPI | A. Devasagayam | 1,199 | 3.89% | |
| BJP | K. Akilan | 629 | 2.04% | 1.14% |
| NOTA | None of the Above | 579 | 1.88% | |
| PMK | R. Murugan | 174 | 0.56% | |
| Margin of victory | | 7,107 | 23.04% | 16.52% |
| Turnout | | 30,851 | 82.56% | −3.12% |
| Registered electors | | 37,366 | | 33.30% |
| INC gain from AINRC | | Swing | 9.89% | |

=== Assembly Election 2011 ===
2011 Puducherry Legislative Assembly election: Ozhukarai
| Party | Candidate | Votes | % | ±% |
|---|---|---|---|---|
| AINRC | N. G. Pannir Selvam | 9,071 | 37.77% | |
| Independent | A. N. Balane | 7,505 | 31.25% | |
| DMK | A. Johnkumar | 6,833 | 28.45% | |
| BJP | V. Santhi | 216 | 0.90% | −0.15% |
| Margin of victory | | 1,566 | 6.52% | 2.25% |
| Turnout | | 24,017 | 85.68% | −2.66% |
| Registered electors | | 28,031 | | −15.36% |
| AINRC gain from INC | | Swing | -10.33% | |

=== Assembly Election 2006 ===
2006 Pondicherry Legislative Assembly election: Ozhukarai
| Party | Candidate | Votes | % | ±% |
|---|---|---|---|---|
| INC | A. Namassivayam | 14,072 | 48.10% | |
| AIADMK | K. Natarajan | 12,824 | 43.83% | 16.89% |
| DMDK | R. Selvaraj | 1,408 | 4.81% | |
| BJP | Dr. N. Dharmaraj | 307 | 1.05% | |
| Independent | R. Mathivanan | 168 | 0.57% | |
| Margin of victory | | 1,248 | 4.27% | −14.28% |
| Turnout | | 29,256 | 88.34% | 16.38% |
| Registered electors | | 33,116 | | 6.57% |
| INC gain from TMC(M) | | Swing | 2.61% | |

=== Assembly Election 2001 ===
2001 Pondicherry Legislative Assembly election: Ozhukarai
| Party | Candidate | Votes | % | ±% |
|---|---|---|---|---|
| TMC(M) | A. Namassivayam | 10,164 | 45.49% | |
| AIADMK | K. Natarajan | 6,021 | 26.95% | −14.15% |
| DMK | N. Balane | 5,624 | 25.17% | −7.79% |
| Independent | G. Radha Krishnan | 154 | 0.69% | |
| MDMK | T. N. Parthiban | 106 | 0.47% | |
| Margin of victory | | 4,143 | 18.54% | 10.41% |
| Turnout | | 22,343 | 71.96% | 0.82% |
| Registered electors | | 31,075 | | 17.87% |
| TMC(M) gain from AIADMK | | Swing | -11.32% | |

=== Assembly Election 1996 ===
1996 Pondicherry Legislative Assembly election: Ozhukarai
| Party | Candidate | Votes | % | ±% |
|---|---|---|---|---|
| AIADMK | K. Natarajan | 7,794 | 41.10% | −15.72% |
| DMK | R. R. Somasundaram | 6,252 | 32.97% | −8.68% |
| MDMK | A. Namassivayam | 4,301 | 22.68% | |
| Independent | A. Jaya | 274 | 1.44% | |
| BSP | A. Mohamadou Ibrahim | 116 | 0.61% | |
| Independent | G. Adhimoolam | 97 | 0.51% | |
| Margin of victory | | 1,542 | 8.13% | −7.04% |
| Turnout | | 18,965 | 75.71% | 4.56% |
| Registered electors | | 26,363 | | 21.25% |
| AIADMK hold | | Swing | -15.72% | |

=== Assembly Election 1991 ===
1991 Pondicherry Legislative Assembly election: Ozhukarai
| Party | Candidate | Votes | % | ±% |
|---|---|---|---|---|
| AIADMK | K. Natarajan | 8,566 | 56.82% | 13.82% |
| DMK | M. Rasan Alias Vazhumuni | 6,279 | 41.65% | −12.43% |
| Independent | A. Mohamed Yousuf | 87 | 0.58% | |
| JP | P. Perumal | 69 | 0.46% | |
| Margin of victory | | 2,287 | 15.17% | 4.09% |
| Turnout | | 15,077 | 71.15% | −5.38% |
| Registered electors | | 21,742 | | 2.15% |
| AIADMK gain from DMK | | Swing | 2.74% | |

=== Assembly Election 1990 ===
1990 Pondicherry Legislative Assembly election: Ozhukarai
| Party | Candidate | Votes | % | ±% |
|---|---|---|---|---|
| DMK | M. Rasan Alias Vazhumuni | 8,749 | 54.08% | 12.51% |
| AIADMK | M. Padmanabhan | 6,956 | 43.00% | −10.78% |
| PMK | Abdul Rayub Alias Syed Chand | 438 | 2.71% | |
| Margin of victory | | 1,793 | 11.08% | −1.13% |
| Turnout | | 16,178 | 76.53% | −6.34% |
| Registered electors | | 21,285 | | 64.20% |
| DMK gain from AIADMK | | Swing | 0.30% | |

=== Assembly Election 1985 ===
1985 Pondicherry Legislative Assembly election: Ozhukarai
| Party | Candidate | Votes | % | ±% |
|---|---|---|---|---|
| AIADMK | R. Somasundaram | 5,729 | 53.78% | 21.53% |
| DMK | G. Perumal Raja | 4,428 | 41.57% | −24.42% |
| JP | V. Chandrasekaran | 348 | 3.27% | |
| BJP | B. Azhagannandem | 75 | 0.70% | |
| Independent | R. Abbaye | 53 | 0.50% | |
| Margin of victory | | 1,301 | 12.21% | −21.52% |
| Turnout | | 10,653 | 82.87% | −1.52% |
| Registered electors | | 12,963 | | 22.32% |
| AIADMK gain from DMK | | Swing | -12.20% | |

=== Assembly Election 1980 ===
1980 Pondicherry Legislative Assembly election: Ozhukarai
| Party | Candidate | Votes | % | ±% |
|---|---|---|---|---|
| DMK | G. Perumal Raja | 5,493 | 65.98% | 34.31% |
| AIADMK | R. Somasundaram | 2,685 | 32.25% | 3.91% |
| JP(S) | Mohamed Ilyas | 97 | 1.17% | |
| Margin of victory | | 2,808 | 33.73% | 30.39% |
| Turnout | | 8,325 | 84.39% | 3.44% |
| Registered electors | | 10,598 | | 8.29% |
| DMK hold | | Swing | 34.31% | |

=== Assembly Election 1977 ===
1977 Pondicherry Legislative Assembly election: Ozhukarai
| Party | Candidate | Votes | % | ±% |
|---|---|---|---|---|
| DMK | G. Perumal Raja | 2,477 | 31.68% | 1.54% |
| AIADMK | G. Venugopal | 2,216 | 28.34% | −11.11% |
| CPI | N. Gurusamy | 1,685 | 21.55% | |
| JP | P. Devaraj | 1,442 | 18.44% | |
| Margin of victory | | 261 | 3.34% | −5.97% |
| Turnout | | 7,820 | 80.95% | −6.19% |
| Registered electors | | 9,787 | | 9.01% |
| DMK gain from AIADMK | | Swing | -7.77% | |

=== Assembly Election 1974 ===
1974 Pondicherry Legislative Assembly election: Ozhukarai
| Party | Candidate | Votes | % | ±% |
|---|---|---|---|---|
| AIADMK | Venugopal Alias G. Mannathan | 2,982 | 39.44% | |
| DMK | S. Muthu | 2,278 | 30.13% | |
| INC | P. Ramachandran | 1,784 | 23.60% | |
| Independent | A. Lazar Their | 516 | 6.83% | |
| Margin of victory | | 704 | 9.31% | |
| Turnout | | 7,560 | 87.15% | |
| Registered electors | | 8,978 | | |
| AIADMK win (new seat) | | | | |

== See also ==
- List of constituencies of the Puducherry Legislative Assembly
- Puducherry district
