= 14th Puducherry Assembly =

Successor of 13th Assembly of Pondicherry

14th Assembly of Pondicherry
←	Thirteenth Assembly of Pondicherry	Fifteenth Assembly of Pondicherry	→

Overview
- Legislative body: Pondicherry Legislative Assembly
- Term: 2016 – 22 February 2021
- Election: 2016 Puducherry Legislative Assembly election
- Government: Indian National Congress
- Opposition: All India N.R. Congress
- Members: 30+3

The Fourteenth Assembly of Pondicherry succeeded the 13th Assembly of Pondicherry and was constituted after the victory of Indian National Congress (INC) and allies in the 2016 assembly election held on 16 May 2016.

== Important members ==
- Speaker:
  - V. Vaithilingam from 10 June 2016 to 21 March 2019
  - V. P. Sivakolundhu from 3 June 2019 to 22 February 2021
- Deputy Speaker:
  - V. P. Sivakolundhu from 10 Jun 2016 to 2. Jun. 2019
  - M. N. R. Balan from 4 September 2019 to 22 February 2021
- Chief minister:
  - V. Narayanasamy from 6 June 2016 to 22 February 2021 (Note: The 2021 judgement by Honourable Supreme court of India sealed the fate of sealed the fate of Narayasamy's government. He lost the trust vote as the nominated MLAs voted against him. With resignations of 6 MLAs (five from Congress and one from DMK), from 33 the house strength dwindled to 26. The Narayansamy-led UPA government consisting of Congress (9 with speaker), DMK (2) and an independent (1) had strength 12. The opposition strength 14 MLAs which consisted of AINRC (7), AIADMK (4) and the three nominated members affiliated to BJP. As per the judgement, counting the strength of nominated MLAs, the opposition outnumbered the government in strength and the government fell out subsequently and the president rule was imposed.)
- Leader of opposition:
  - N. Rangaswamy from June 2016 to 22 February 2021

Keys: Congress (15) All India N.R. Congress (8) Dravida Munnetra Kazhagam (2) All India Anna Dravida Munnetra Kazhagam (4) Bharatiya Janata Party (3) Independent (1)

Parties	Seats
Indian National Congress	15
All India N.R. Congress	8
All India Anna Dravida Munnetra Kazhagam	4
Dravida Munnetra Kazhagam	2
Bharatiya Janata Party	3
Independents	1

== See also ==
- Government of Puducherry
- List of chief ministers of Puducherry
- List of speakers of the Puducherry Legislative Assembly
- List of lieutenant governors of Puducherry
- Puducherry Legislative Assembly
- Pondicherry Representative Assembly
- 2016 Puducherry Legislative Assembly election
- First Assembly of Puducherry
