= List of speakers of the Puducherry Legislative Assembly =

Presiding officer of Union Territory of Puducherry legislative assembly

Speaker of the Puducherry Legislative Assembly
- Président de l'Assemblée législative de Pondichéry
- Incumbent; Vacant since may 2026
- Appointer: Members of Puducherry Legislative Assembly
- Term length: 5 years no renewable limit
- Inaugural holder: A. S. Gangeyan
- Formation: 22 July 1963; 63 years ago
- Deputy: vacant (since may 2026)

Speaker of the Puducherry Legislative Assembly is the presiding officer of the Legislative Assembly of Puducherry, the main law-making body for the Indian UT of Puducherry. The speaker is always a member of the Legislative Assembly.

== History ==
The Pondicherry Representative Assembly was converted into the Legislative Assembly of Pondicherry on 1 July 1963 as per Section 54(3) of The Union Territories Act, 1963 and its members (who got elected in 1959) were deemed to have been elected to the Legislative Assembly. The elections for the Puducherry Vidhan Sabha held since 1964.

== List of the speakers and deputy speakers ==
The tenure of different speakers of Puducherry Legislative Assembly is given below
Keys: All India Anna Dravida Munnetra Kazhagam (AIADMK) All India N.R. Congress (AINRC) Bharatiya Janata Party (BJP) Dravida Munnetra Kazhagam (DMK) Indian National Congress (INC)

#	Name	Took office	Left office	Political party	Deputy Speaker	No. of Assembly	Election
1	A. S. Gangeyan	22 July 1963	18 September 1964	Indian National Congress	Kamisetty Parasuram Naidu (27 Nov. 1963 – 24 Aug. 1964)	1st	1959
2	M. O. H. Farook	19 September 1964	19 March 1967	Indian National Congress	V. N. Purushothaman (25 Sep. 1964 – 17 Sep. 1968)	2nd	1964
3	P. Shanmugam	30 March 1967	9 March 1968	Indian National Congress	V. N. Purushothaman (25 Sep. 1964 – 17 Sep. 1968)	2nd	1964
4	S. Manicka Vasagam	25 March 1968	17 September 1968	Indian National Congress	V. N. Purushothaman (25 Sep. 1964 – 17 Sep. 1968)	2nd	1964
-	Vacant (Note: Assembly dissolved after fall of DMK government following decision of two ministers to join newly formed ADMK.) (President's rule) (Note: When President's rule is in force in a state, its council of ministers stands dissolved. The office of chief minister thus lies vacant. At times, the legislative assembly also stands dissolved.)	18 September 1968	17 March 1969	N/A	Vacant	2nd	1964
5	S. Perumal	22 March 1969	2 December 1971	Dravida Munnetra Kazhagam	M.L. Selvaradjou (26 Mar. 1969 – 28 Mar. 1972)	3rd	1969
6	M.L. Selvaradjou	29 March 1972	3 January 1974	Indian National Congress	Kamisetty Parasuram Naidu (5 Apr. 1972 – 2 Jan. 1974)	3rd	1969
-	Vacant (Note: Assembly was dissolved and president's rule imposed as opposition parties had a chance to form a government after the fall of the Congress government.) (President's rule)	3 January 1974	6 March 1974	N/A	Vacant	3rd	1969
7	S. Pakkiam	26 March 1974	28 March 1974	All India Anna Dravida Munnetra Kazhagam	-	4th	1974
-	Vacant (Note: Fall of coalition government of ADMK, Congress(O) following division of votes by Congress(R) and DMK. The Assembly was dissolved.) (President's rule)	28 March 1974	2 July 1977	N/A	Vacant	4th	1974
8	K. Kanthi	2 July 1977	12 November 1978	Indian National Congress	S. Pazhaninathan (11 Aug. 1977 – 11 Nov. 1978)	5th	1977
-	Vacant (Note: Fall of government due to political instability.) (President's rule)	12 November 1978	16 January 1980	N/A	Vacant	5th	1977
(2)	M. O. H. Farook (Note: Second term.)	16 January 1980	24 June 1983	Indian National Congress	L.Joseph Mariadoss (29 Jan. 1980 – 23 Jun. 1983)	6th	1980
-	Vacant (Note: Government dismissed following withdrawal of Congress(I) from coalition government. In spite of incumbent chief minister asking for an opportunity to prove his majority on the floor of the house, the assembly was dissolved.) (President's rule)	24 June 1983	16 March 1985	N/A	Vacant	6th	1980
9	Kamisetty Parasuram Naidu	16 March 1985	19 January 1989	Indian National Congress	M. Chandirakasu (29 Mar. 1985 – 28 Mar. 1989)	7th	1985
10	M. Chandirakasu	29 March 1989	5 March 1990	Indian National Congress	P.K. Sathianandan (5 Apr. 1989 – 4 Mar. 1990)	7th	1985
11	G. Palaniraja	22 Mar. 1990	3 Mar. 1991	Dravida Munnetra Kazhagam	A. Bakthavatchalam (29 Mar. 1990 – 3 Mar. 1991)	8th	1990
-	Vacant (Note: DMK Government dismissed in spite of having a majority in the Assembly.) (President's rule)	22 Mar. 1991	4 Jul. 1991	N/A	Vacant	8th	1990
12	P. Kannan (Note: Deputy Speaker Shri A.V. Subramanian chaired the debate on the Motion of Confidence of 10 October 1994 and the Motion of No-confidence of 28 September 1995.)	26 Jul. 1991	13 May 1996	Indian National Congress	A. V. Subramanian (31 Jul. 1991 – 13 May 1996)	9th	1991
13	V.M.C. Sivakumar	10 Jul. 1996	18 Mar. 2000	Dravida Munnetra Kazhagam	V. Nagarathinam (13 Jun. 1996 – 23 May 1997); M. Kandasamy (23 Aug. 1997 – 30 May 2000); K. Rajasekaran (30 May 2000 – 15 May 2001)	10th	1996
-	M. Kandasamy (Note: Deputy Speaker M. Kandasamy chaired the debate on the Motion of Confidence on that day.)	27 Mar. 2000	27 Mar. 2000	Tamil Maanila Congress	V. Nagarathinam (13 Jun. 1996 – 23 May 1997); M. Kandasamy (23 Aug. 1997 – 30 May 2000); K. Rajasekaran (30 May 2000 – 15 May 2001)	10th	1996
14	A.V. Subramanian	24 May 2000	31 May 2001	Indian National Congress	V. Nagarathinam (13 Jun. 1996 – 23 May 1997); M. Kandasamy (23 Aug. 1997 – 30 May 2000); K. Rajasekaran (30 May 2000 – 15 May 2001)	10th	1996
15	M.D.R. Ramachandran	11 Jun. 2001	26 May 2006	Indian National Congress	M. Chandirakasu (5 Jul. 2001 – 10 Nov. 2001); A.V. Subramanian (12 Dec. 2001 – 11 May 2006)	11th	2001
16	R. Radhakrishnan	1 Jun. 2006	May 2011	Indian National Congress	A.V. Sreedharan (1 Jun. 2006 - 3 Sep. 2008); V. Vaithilingam (4 Sep. 2008 - N.A.)	12th	2006
17	V. Sabapathy	29 Jun 2011	May 2016	All India N.R. Congress	T. P. R. Selvame (2 Nov 2011 - May 2016)	13th	2011
18	V. Vaithilingam	10 Jun 2016	21 Mar. 2019	Indian National Congress	V. P. Sivakolundhu (10 Jun 2016 - 2. Jun. 2019)	14th	2016
19	V. P. Sivakolundhu	3 Jun. 2019	3 May 2021	Indian National Congress	M. N. R. Balan (4 Sep. 2019- 3 May 2021)	14th	2016
20	Embalam R. Selvam	16 June 2021	4 May 2026	Bharatiya Janata Party	P. Rajavelu (25 Aug. 2021-4 May 2026)	15th	2021

== Pro tem Speaker ==
=== List of Pro tem Speakers ===
K. Lakshminarayanan 2021

== See also ==
- Government of Puducherry
- List of chief ministers of Puducherry
- List of leaders of the opposition in the Puducherry Legislative Assembly
- List of lieutenant governors of Puducherry
- Puducherry Legislative Assembly
- Pondicherry Representative Assembly
- Elections in Puducherry

== Notes ==
Footnotes
