= K. Narayanasamy =

Indian politician

Member of the Puducherry Legislative Assembly
- Incumbent
- Assumed office 2026
- Preceded by: N. G. Pannirselvam
- Constituency: Ozhukarai

Personal details
- Party: All India N.R. Congress
- Profession: Politician

K. Narayanasamy is an Indian politician and member of the All India N.R. Congress. He was elected as a Member of the Puducherry Legislative Assembly from the Ozhukarai constituency in the 2026 Puducherry Legislative Assembly election.
