= Manavely Assembly constituency =

Constituency of the Puducherry legislative assembly in India

Coordinates: 11.917°N 79.775°E

Manavely
- Constituency No. 30 for the Puducherry Legislative Assembly
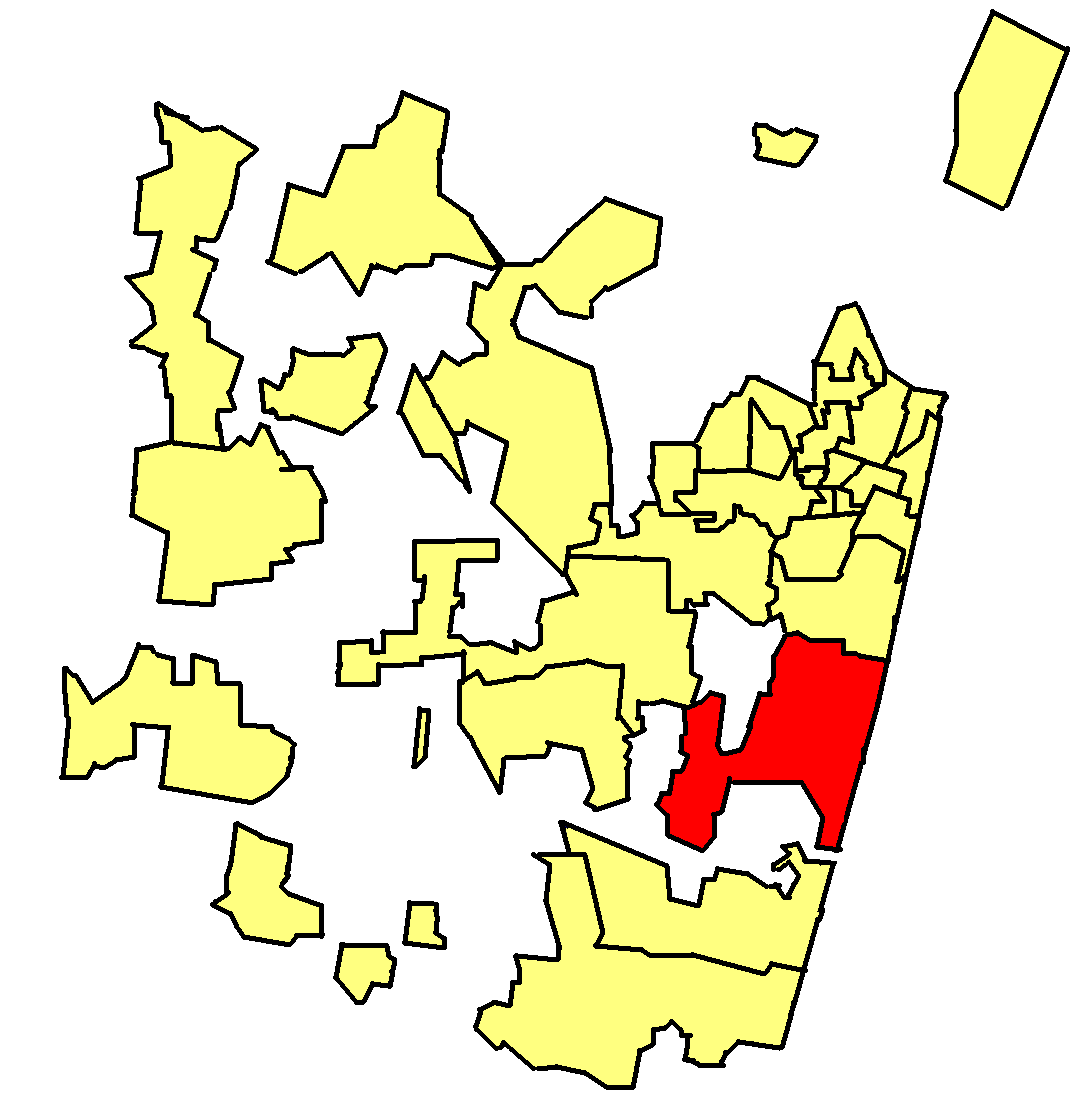

Constituency details
- Country: India
- Region: South India
- Union Territory: Puducherry
- District: Puducherry
- Lok Sabha constituency: Puducherry
- Established: 2008
- Total electors: 37,747
- Reservation: None

Member of Legislative Assembly
- 16th Puducherry Legislative Assembly
- Incumbent B. Ramu
- Party: Tamilaga Vettri Kazhagam
- Elected year: 2026

Manavely is a legislative assembly constituency in the Union territory of Puducherry in India. Manavely Assembly constituency was established in 2011 and it is a part of Puducherry Lok Sabha constituency. It consists of Manavely, Abishegapakkam, Tavalakuppam, Purnankuppam and Thimmanaickenpalayam villages, all in the Ariankuppam Commune Panchayat. As of 2021, its representative is Embalam R. Selvam of the Bharatiya Janata Party.

== Members of the Legislative Assembly ==
Year	Member	Political Party
2011	P. Purushothaman	All India Anna Dravida Munnetra Kazhagam
2016	R. K. R. Anantharaman	Indian National Congress
2021	Embalam R. Selvam	Bharatiya Janata Party
2026	B. Ramu	Tamilaga Vettri Kazhagam

== Election results ==
Vote share of Winning candidates
2026	42.68%
2021	57.54%
2016	34.03%
2011	57.98%

=== 2026 ===
2026 Puducherry Legislative Assembly election: Manavely
Party	Candidate	Votes	%	±%
TVK	B. Ramu	13,822	42.68	
BJP	Embalam R. Selvam	10,729	33.13	▼24.41
INC	R. K. R. Anantharaman	5,932	18.32	▼12.05
IND	R. Perumal	754	2.33	
NOTA	None of the above	235	0.73	▼0.62
Majority		3,093	9.55	▼17.62
Turnout		32,386	93.95	▲7.21
TVK gain from BJP		Swing		

=== 2021 ===
2021 Puducherry Legislative Assembly election: Manavely
Party	Candidate	Votes	%	±%
BJP	Embalam R. Selvam	17,225	57.54	▲56.91
INC	R. K. R. Anantharaman	9,093	30.37	▼3.66
IND	T. Anandan	613	2.05	
MNM	Sundarambal Malarvizhi	426	1.42	
NOTA	None of the above	405	1.35	▼0.26
Majority		8,132	27.17	▲17.26
Turnout		29,936	86.74	▼0.89
BJP gain from INC		Swing		

=== 2016 ===
2016 Puducherry Legislative Assembly election: Manavely
Party	Candidate	Votes	%	±%
INC	R. K. R. Anantharaman	9,326	34.03	
AINRC	G. Suresh	6,611	24.12	
IND	Embalam R. Selvam	5,831	21.27	
AIADMK	P. Purushothaman	3,350	12.22	▼45.76
VCK	P. Rajakumar	833	3.04	
NOTA	None of the above	442	1.61	
Majority		2,715	9.91	▼8.06
Turnout		27,409	87.63	▼1.70
INC gain from AIADMK		Swing		

=== 2011 ===
2011 Puducherry Legislative Assembly election: Manavely
Party	Candidate	Votes	%	±%
AIADMK	P. Purushothaman	13,979	57.98	
PMK	R. K. R. Anantharaman	9,646	40.01	
IND	S. Kumar	244	1.01	
IJK	J. Veerasekaran	241	1.00	
Majority		4,333	17.97	
Turnout		24,110	89.33	
AIADMK win (new seat)				
