= B. Ramu =

Indian politician

Member of the Puducherry Legislative Assembly
- Incumbent
- Assumed office 2026
- Preceded by: Embalam R. Selvam
- Constituency: Manavely

Personal details
- Party: Tamilaga Vettri Kazhagam
- Profession: Politician

B. Ramu is an Indian politician from Puducherry. He is a member of the Puducherry Legislative Assembly from Manavely representing Tamilaga Vettri Kazhagam.

== Political career ==
Ramu won the Manavely seat in the 2026 Puducherry Legislative Assembly election as a candidate of Tamilaga Vettri Kazhagam. He received 13,822 votes and defeated Embalam R. Selvam of the Bharatiya Janata Party by a margin of 3,093 votes.
