= Indira Nagar Assembly constituency =

Constituency of the Puducherry legislative assembly in India

Coordinates: 11.954°N 79.791°E

Indira Nagar
- Constituency No. 8 for the Puducherry Legislative Assembly
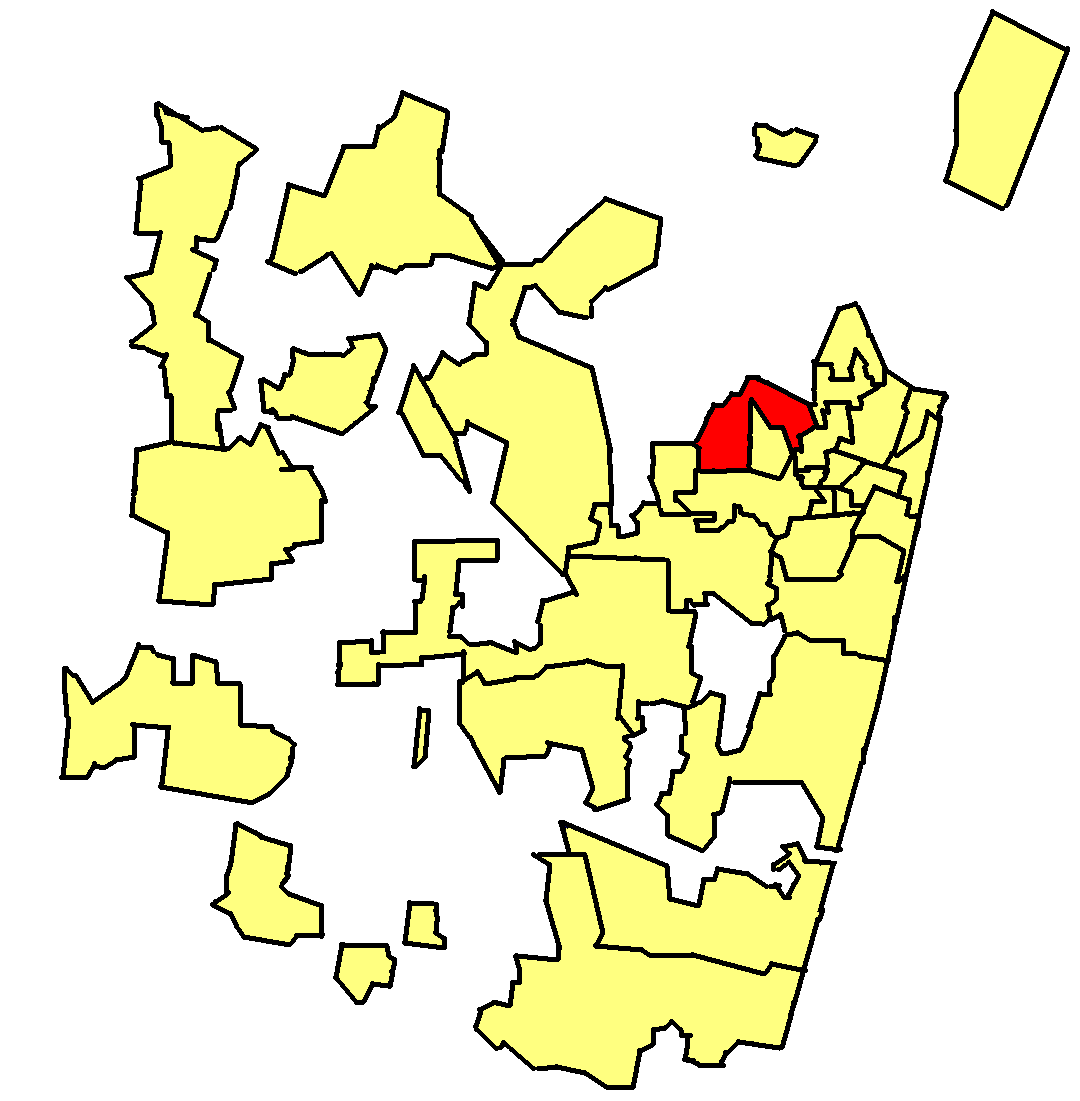

Constituency details
- Country: India
- Region: South India
- Union Territory: Puducherry
- District: Puducherry
- Lok Sabha constituency: Puducherry
- Established: 2008
- Total electors: 35,492
- Reservation: None

Member of Legislative Assembly
- 16th Puducherry Legislative Assembly
- Incumbent A.K.D V. Arumugam
- Party: AINRC
- Alliance: NDA
- Elected year: 2021

Indira Nagar is a legislative assembly constituency in the Union territory of Puducherry in India. Indira Nagar Assembly constituency is a part of Puducherry Lok Sabha constituency.

== Members of the Legislative Assembly ==
Year	Name	Party
2011	N. Rangasamy	All India N.R. Congress
2011^	A. T. Selvane	All India N.R. Congress
2016	N. Rangasamy	All India N.R. Congress
2021	A. K. D. Arumugam	All India N.R. Congress
2026	A. K. D. Arumugam	All India N.R. Congress

== Election results ==
Vote share of Winning candidates
2026	42.13%
2021	74.77%
2016	52.69%
2011 by-poll	62.14%
2011	83.77%

=== 2026 ===
2026 Puducherry Legislative Assembly election: Indira Nagar
Party	Candidate	Votes	%	±%
AINRC	A. K. D. Arumugam	12,640	42.13	▼32.64
TVK	S. Mourougane	12,056	40.19	
INC	N. Rajakumar	2,104	7.01	▼4.32
IND	G. Robert Jesudass	1,946	6.49	
NOTA	None of the above	316	1.05	▼0.90
IND	K. Rajasekar	130	0.43	
PMK	E. Vadivel	78	0.26	
AIPTMMK (Note: All India Puratchi Thalaivar Makkal Munnettra Kazhagam)	Jayaball @ Sengeni	56	0.19	
Majority		584	1.94	▼61.50
Turnout		30,001	92.09	▲10.05
AINRC hold		Swing		

=== 2021 ===
2021 Puducherry Legislative Assembly election: Indira Nagar
Party	Candidate	Votes	%	±%
AINRC	A. K. D. Arumugam	21,841	74.77	▲22.08
INC	M. Kannan	3,310	11.33	▼29.76
MNM	P. Sakthivel	1,218	4.17	
NOTA	None of the above	569	1.95	▲0.35
DMDK	K. Ezhumalai	156	0.53	
IJK	D. Ejoumale	152	0.52	▲0.47
IND	S. Karthigayan	109	0.37	
Amma Makkal Munnettra Kazagam	D. Mohan	83	0.28	
Majority		18,531	63.44	▲51.84
Turnout		29,212	82.04	▼2.93
AINRC hold		Swing		

=== 2016 ===
2016 Puducherry Legislative Assembly election: Indira Nagar
Party	Candidate	Votes	%	±%
AINRC	N. Rangasamy	15,463	52.69	▼9.45
INC	A. K. D. Arumugam	12,059	41.09	▲12.16
AIADMK	T. Gunasegaran	612	2.09	▼4.42
NOTA	None of the above	470	1.60	
BJP	V. Murugan	228	0.78	
PMK	E. Vadivel	224	0.76	
RSP	K. Lenin	63	0.21	
IND	I. Senthil Kumar	48	0.16	
IND	R. Annadurai	15	0.05	
IJK	R. Shanmugam	14	0.05	▼0.11
Majority		3,404	11.60	▼21.61
Turnout		29,345	84.97	
AINRC hold		Swing		

=== 2011 by-election ===
2011 Puducherry Assembly by-election: Indira Nagar
Party	Candidate	Votes	%	±%
AINRC	A. T. Selvane	15,053	62.14	▼21.63
INC	A. K. D. Arumugam	7,007	28.93	▲12.70
AIADMK	A. V. Baskaran	1,578	6.51	
IND	D. T. Selvam	388	1.60	
IND	S. Veeraragavan	109	0.45	
BSP	K. Vaithianathan	51	0.21	
IJK	R. Shanmugam	38	0.16	
Majority		8,046	33.21	▼34.33
Turnout		24,224		
AINRC hold		Swing		

=== 2011 ===
2011 Puducherry Legislative Assembly election: Indira Nagar
Party	Candidate	Votes	%	±%
AINRC	N. Rangasamy	20,685	83.77	
INC	V. Aroumougam	4,008	16.23	
Majority		16,677	67.54	
Turnout		24,693	84.68	
AINRC win (new seat)				

== See also ==
- List of constituencies of the Puducherry Legislative Assembly
- Puducherry district
