= Embalam R. Selvam =

Indian politician

Speaker of the Puducherry Legislative Assembly
- In office 16 June 2021 – 4 May 2026
- Chief Minister: N. Rangasamy
- Deputy Speakar: P. Rajavelu
- Preceded by: V. P. Sivakolundhu

Member of Puducherry Legislative Assembly
- In office 2 May 2021 – 2026
- Preceded by: R. K. R. Anantharaman
- Constituency: Manavely

Personal details
- Party: Bharatiya Janata Party

Embalam R. Selvam is an Indian politician. He is the 20th and former Speaker of Puducherry Legislative Assembly 2021-26. He was elected to the Puducherry Legislative Assembly from Manavely as a member of the Bharatiya Janata Party.

== Offices held ==
Puducherry Legislative Assembly
| Preceded by R. K. R. Anantharaman | Member of the Legislative Assembly for Manavely; 2021–26 | Incumbent |
Political offices
| Preceded by V.P. Sivakolundhu | Speaker of Puducherry Legislative Assembly; 2021–26 | Incumbent |
