= M. N. R. Balan =

Indian politician

M.N.R. Balan is an Indian politician who served as Deputy Speaker of 14th Puducherry Assembly and Member of 14th Puducherry Assembly from Ozhukarai Assembly constituency. He is the son-in law of R. V. Janakiraman.
