= M. Vaithianathan =

Indian politician

Member of the Legislative Assembly
- In office 2 March 2021 – 4 May 2026
- Succeeded by: V. P. Sivakolundhu
- Constituency: Lawspet
- In office 2011–2016
- Preceded by: M. O. H. F. Shahjahan
- Succeeded by: V. P. Sivakolundhu
- Constituency: Lawspet

Personal details
- Party: Indian National Congress (12th March 2021-present)
- Other political affiliations: Independent (2016-12th March 2021)

M. Vaithianathan is an INC politician and a former member of the Puducherry Legislative Assembly from the Lawspet constituency. He had previously won that constituency in an All India N.R. Congress ticket in the 2011 Puducherry Assembly election, polling 10189 votes, defeating V. P. Sivakolundhu of Congress with a margin of 5432 votes. During the 2016 assembly election however, he was denied a ticket from AINRC. He then contested independently but lost to V. P. Sivakolundhu placing himself second in the constituency on poll count. Just prior to the 2021 Puducherry assembly election Vaithianathan joined the Congress party and contested from Lawspet constituency again, this time defeating the Puducherry state BJP president, V. Saminathan by a margin of 5701 votes.
