= Lawspet Assembly constituency =

Constituency of the Puducherry legislative assembly in India

Coordinates: 11.955°N 79.815°E

Lawspet
- Constituency No. 11 for the Puducherry Legislative Assembly
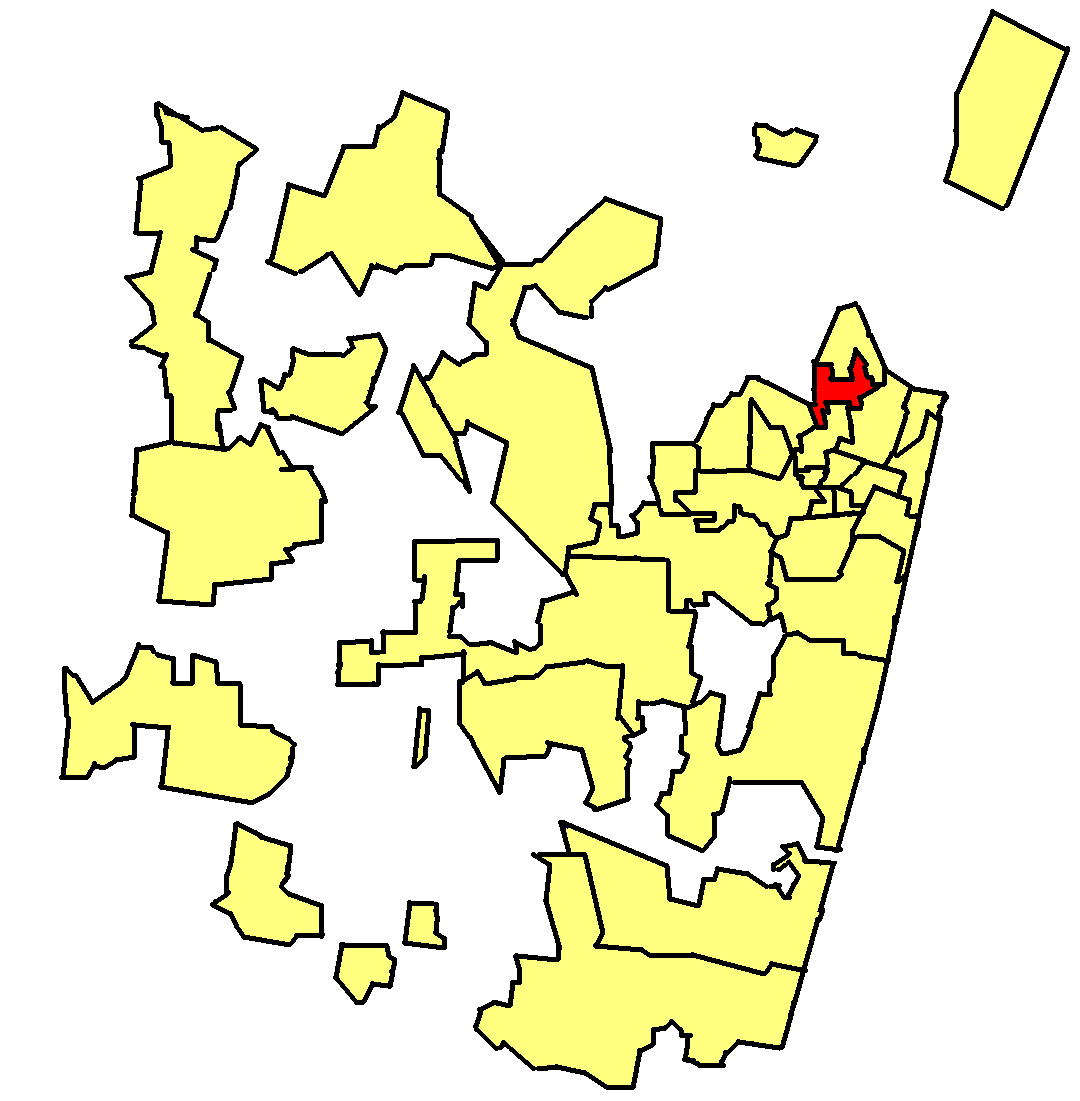

Constituency details
- Country: India
- Region: South India
- Union Territory: Puducherry
- District: Puducherry
- Lok Sabha constituency: Puducherry
- Established: 1964
- Total electors: 32,359
- Reservation: None

Member of Legislative Assembly
- 16th Puducherry Legislative Assembly
- Incumbent V. P. Sivakolundhu
- Party: All India N.R. Congress
- Elected year: 2026

Lawspet is a legislative assembly constituency in the Union territory of Puducherry in India. Lawspet Assembly constituency is a part of Puducherry Lok Sabha constituency. It is currently represented by V. P. Sivakolundhu of the All India N.R. Congress in the legislative assembly.

== Members of Legislative Assembly ==
Year	Name	Party
1977	N. Varadhan	All India Anna Dravida Munnetra Kazhagam
1980	M. O. H. Farook	Indian National Congress
1985	M. O. H. Farook	Indian National Congress
1990	M. O. H. Farook	Indian National Congress
1991	P. Kannan	Indian National Congress
1996	N. Kesavan	Dravida Munnetra Kazhagam
2001	M. O. H. F. Shahjahan	Indian National Congress
2006	M. O. H. F. Shahjahan	Indian National Congress
2011	M. Vaithianathan	All India N.R. Congress
2016	V. P. Sivakolundhu	Indian National Congress
2021	M. Vaithianathan	Indian National Congress
2026	V. P. Sivakolundhu	All India N.R. Congress

== Election results ==
Vote share of winning candidates
2026	39.52%
2021	55.60%
2016	46.89%
2011	51.79%
2006	43.03%
2001	38.51%
1996	54.40%
1991	61.51%
1990	53.00%
1985	60.36%
1980	78.68%
1977	47.73%
1974	39.21%

=== Assembly Election 2026 ===
2026 Puducherry Legislative Assembly election: Lawspet
Party	Candidate	Votes	%	±%
AINRC	V. P. Sivakolundhu	10,578	39.52	
INC	M. Vaithianathan	9161	34.23	
TVK	V. Saminathan	5647	21.1	New
CPI(M)	R. Rajangam	301	1.12	
NOTA	NOTA	228	0.85	
Margin of victory		1417		
Turnout		26766		
Rejected ballots				
Registered electors		29,797		
AINRC gain from INC		Swing		

=== Assembly Election 2021 ===
2021 Puducherry Legislative Assembly election: Lawspet
Party	Candidate	Votes	%	±%
INC	M. Vaithianathan	14,592	55.60%	8.71%
BJP	V. Saminathan	8,891	33.88%	28.05%
MNM	D. Sathiyamoorthy	825	3.14%	
NOTA	Nota	423	1.61%	−0.47%
Margin of victory		5,701	21.72%	−3.18%
Turnout		26,245	80.67%	−3.07%
Registered electors		32,535		5.20%
INC hold		Swing	8.71%	

=== Assembly Election 2016 ===
2016 Puducherry Legislative Assembly election: Lawspet
Party	Candidate	Votes	%	±%
INC	V. P. Sivakolundhu	12,144	46.89%	22.71%
Independent	M. Vaithianathan	5,695	21.99%	
AINRC	Nandha T. Saravanan	4,066	15.70%	
BJP	V. Saminathan	1,509	5.83%	−2.67%
AIADMK	G. Anbanandam	797	3.08%	
CPI(M)	A. Anand	739	2.85%	−0.44%
NOTA	None of the Above	538	2.08%	
Margin of victory		6,449	24.90%	−2.71%
Turnout		25,898	83.74%	0.90%
Registered electors		30,928		30.23%
INC gain from AINRC		Swing	-4.90%	

=== Assembly Election 2011 ===
2011 Puducherry Legislative Assembly election: Lawspet
Party	Candidate	Votes	%	±%
AINRC	M. Vaithianathan	10,189	51.79%	
INC	V. P. Sivakolundhu	4,757	24.18%	−18.85%
Independent	Nandha Jaya Sridaran	2,230	11.34%	
BJP	R. V. Saminathan	1,672	8.50%	−16.36%
CPI(M)	Ch. Balamohanan	647	3.29%	
Independent	G. Sathiaraj	108	0.55%	
Margin of victory		5,432	27.61%	10.93%
Turnout		19,673	82.84%	2.20%
Registered electors		23,748		−54.07%
AINRC gain from INC		Swing	8.76%	

=== Assembly Election 2006 ===
2006 Pondicherry Legislative Assembly election: Lawspet
Party	Candidate	Votes	%	±%
INC	M. O. H. F. Shahjahan	17,944	43.03%	4.52%
AIADMK	G. Anandhamurugesan	10,986	26.35%	18.29%
BJP	P. Kalayanasundaram	10,365	24.86%	
DMDK	S. Arunachalam	1,624	3.89%	
Independent	P. Vinothan	239	0.57%	
Margin of victory		6,958	16.69%	10.83%
Turnout		41,700	80.65%	15.14%
Registered electors		51,708		0.75%
INC hold		Swing	4.52%	

=== Assembly Election 2001 ===
2001 Pondicherry Legislative Assembly election: Lawspet
Party	Candidate	Votes	%	±%
INC	M. O. H. F. Shahjahan	12,929	38.51%	4.73%
DMK	N. Kesavan	10,962	32.65%	−21.74%
Independent	V. Elumalai	6,143	18.30%	
AIADMK	K. Kalaiselvi	2,703	8.05%	
Independent	A. Sasikumar	315	0.94%	
Independent	R. Perumal	163	0.49%	
Margin of victory		1,967	5.86%	−14.76%
Turnout		33,573	65.51%	−0.64%
Registered electors		51,323		18.75%
INC gain from DMK		Swing	-23.00%	

=== Assembly Election 1996 ===
1996 Pondicherry Legislative Assembly election: Lawspet
Party	Candidate	Votes	%	±%
DMK	N. Kesavan	16,442	54.40%	
INC	M. O. H. F. Shahjahan	10,211	33.78%	−27.73%
CPI(M)	Sankaran	2,596	8.59%	−28.33%
BJP	L. Karunakaran	359	1.19%	
Independent	V. Janakiraman	220	0.73%	
Independent	S. Anandan @ Loganathan	138	0.46%	
Margin of victory		6,231	20.61%	−3.98%
Turnout		30,227	71.79%	5.64%
Registered electors		43,218		27.25%
DMK gain from INC		Swing	-7.12%	

=== Assembly Election 1991 ===
1991 Pondicherry Legislative Assembly election: Lawspet
Party	Candidate	Votes	%	±%
INC	P. Kanann	13,475	61.51%	8.51%
CPI(M)	P. Sankaran	8,088	36.92%	−3.92%
PMK	V. P. Raghupathy	186	0.85%	−3.76%
Margin of victory		5,387	24.59%	12.43%
Turnout		21,906	66.15%	−5.88%
Registered electors		33,963		1.71%
INC hold		Swing	8.51%	

=== Assembly Election 1990 ===
1990 Pondicherry Legislative Assembly election: Lawspet
Party	Candidate	Votes	%	±%
INC	M. O. H. Farook	12,637	53.00%	−7.36%
CPI(M)	P. Sankaran	9,738	40.84%	
PMK	P. Raghupathy	1,099	4.61%	
JP	B. Ilangovan	125	0.52%	
Margin of victory		2,899	12.16%	−12.84%
Turnout		23,842	72.02%	−6.31%
Registered electors		33,391		77.35%
INC hold		Swing	-7.36%	

=== Assembly Election 1985 ===
1985 Pondicherry Legislative Assembly election: Lawspet
Party	Candidate	Votes	%	±%
INC	M. O. H. Farook	8,804	60.36%	
DMK	S. Muthu	5,157	35.36%	
Independent	G. Veeraragavan	549	3.76%	
LKD	D. Selvam	76	0.52%	
Margin of victory		3,647	25.00%	−35.05%
Turnout		14,586	78.33%	−4.55%
Registered electors		18,828		32.87%
INC gain from INC(I)		Swing	-18.32%	

=== Assembly Election 1980 ===
1980 Pondicherry Legislative Assembly election: Lawspet
Party	Candidate	Votes	%	±%
INC(I)	M. O. H. Farook	8,980	78.68%	
AIADMK	G. Gopalakrishnan	2,126	18.63%	−29.10%
Independent	A. Semon	226	1.98%	
Independent	M. Purushothaman	81	0.71%	
Margin of victory		6,854	60.05%	39.30%
Turnout		11,413	82.88%	7.99%
Registered electors		14,170		11.75%
INC(I) gain from AIADMK		Swing	30.95%	

=== Assembly Election 1977 ===
1977 Pondicherry Legislative Assembly election: Lawspet
Party	Candidate	Votes	%	±%
AIADMK	N. Varadhan	4,477	47.73%	10.63%
INC	M. K. Jeevarathina Odayar	2,530	26.97%	
JP	S. Ramalingam	1,638	17.46%	
DMK	P. Deivanayagam	735	7.84%	−31.37%
Margin of victory		1,947	20.76%	18.65%
Turnout		9,380	74.89%	−13.23%
Registered electors		12,680		22.56%
AIADMK gain from DMK		Swing	8.52%	

=== Assembly Election 1974 ===
1974 Pondicherry Legislative Assembly election: Lawspet
Party	Candidate	Votes	%	±%
DMK	M. O. H. Farook	3,461	39.21%	
AIADMK	N. Varazhau	3,275	37.10%	
INC(O)	D. Annamalai	2,091	23.69%	
Margin of victory		186	2.11%	
Turnout		8,827	88.12%	
Registered electors		10,346		
DMK win (new seat)				

== See also ==
- List of constituencies of the Puducherry Legislative Assembly
- Puducherry district
