= R. Senthilkumar =

Indian politician

Ramanadhan Senthilkumar (born 1981) is an Indian politician from Puducherry. He is a member of the Puducherry Legislative Assembly from Bahour Assembly constituency in Puducherry district. He won the 2021 Puducherry Legislative Assembly election representing the Dravida Munnetra Kazhagam.

== Early life and education ==
Kumar is from Bahour, Puducherry district. He is the son of Ramanadhan. He completed his MS, BE, LLB at Drexel University, Philadelphia, USA. His wife looks after business.

== Career ==
Kumar won from Bahour Assembly constituency representing Dravida Munnetra Kazhagam in the 2021 Puducherry Legislative Assembly election. He polled 11,789 votes and defeated his nearest rival, N. Dhanavelou of the All India N.R. Congress, by a margin of 201 votes.
