= Mannadipet Assembly constituency =

Constituency of the Puducherry legislative assembly in India

Coordinates: 11.985°N 79.623°E

Mannadipet
- Constituency No. 1 for the Puducherry Legislative Assembly
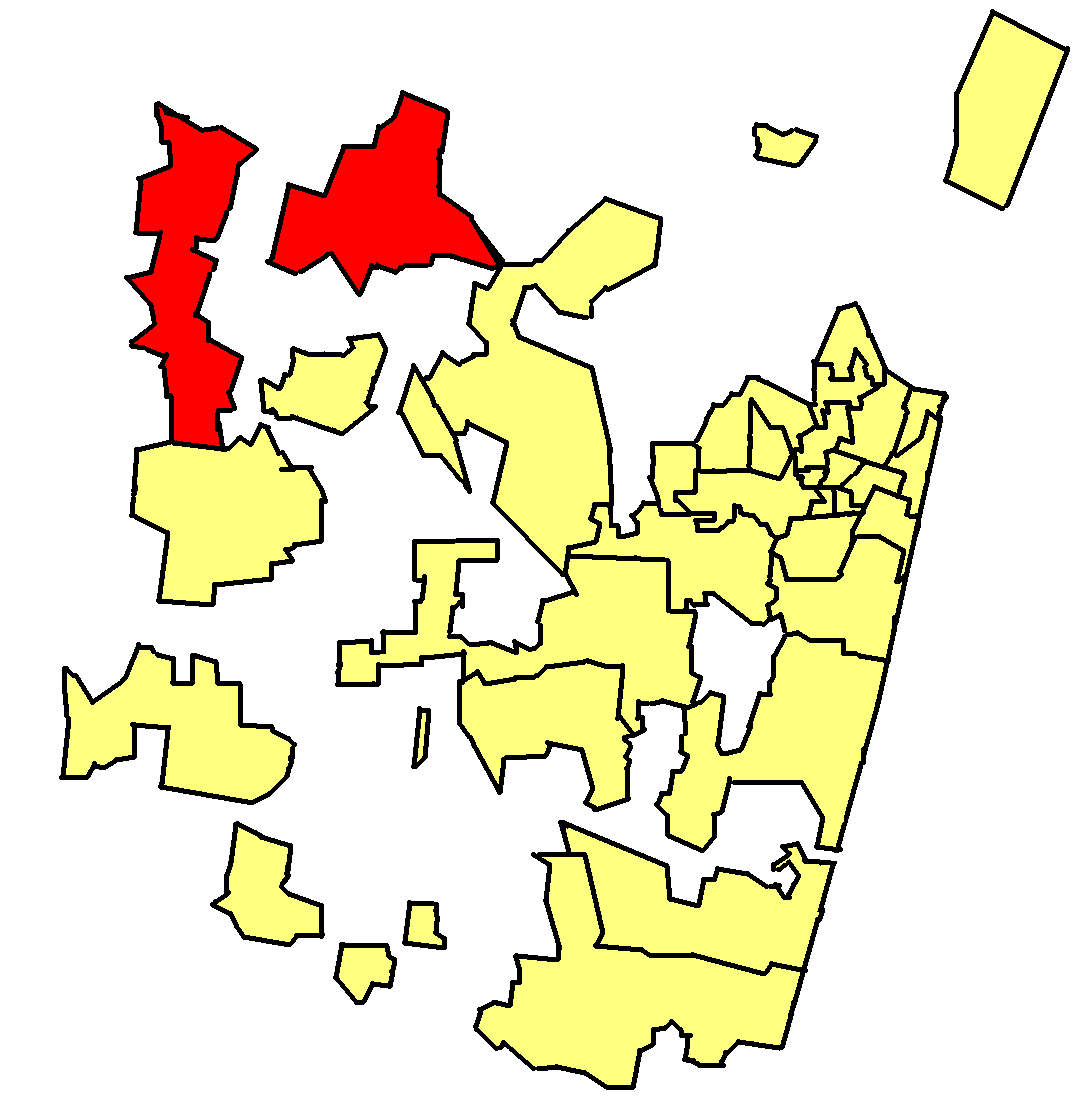

Constituency details
- Country: India
- Region: South India
- Union Territory: Puducherry
- District: Puducherry
- Lok Sabha constituency: Puducherry
- Established: 1964
- Reservation: None

Member of Legislative Assembly
- 16th Puducherry Legislative Assembly
- Incumbent A. Namassivayam
- Party: BJP
- Alliance: NDA

Mannadipet is a legislative assembly constituency in the Union territory of Puducherry in India. This constituency covers a part of the area under Mannadipet Commune Panchayat. Mannadipet Assembly constituency is a part of Puducherry Lok Sabha constituency.

In the 2021 Puducherry Legislative Assembly election, Mannadipet seat was won by A. Namassivayam of the Bharatiya Janata Party, who beat A. Krishan of Dravida Munnetra Kazhagam by a margin of 2750 votes.

== Members of the Legislative Assembly ==
Election	Member	Party
1964	Manickavasaga Reddiar	Indian National Congress
1969	S. M. Subbarayan	Dravida Munnetra Kazhagam
1974	D. Ramachandran	All India Anna Dravida Munnetra Kazhagam
1977	D. Ramachandran	All India Anna Dravida Munnetra Kazhagam
1980	D. Ramachandran	Dravida Munnetra Kazhagam
1985	D. Ramachandran	Dravida Munnetra Kazhagam
1990	D. Ramachandran	Dravida Munnetra Kazhagam
1991	N. Rajaram	Indian National Congress
1996	K. Rajasegaran	Tamil Maanila Congress
2001	D. Ramachandran	All India Anna Dravida Munnetra Kazhagam
2006	P. Arulmurugan	Pattali Makkal Katchi
2011	T. P. R. Selvame	All India N.R. Congress
2016	T. P. R. Selvame	All India N.R. Congress
2021	A. Namassivayam	Bharatiya Janata Party
2026	A. Namassivayam	Bharatiya Janata Party

== Election results ==
Vote share of winning candidates
2021	51.82%
2016	27.84%
2011	49.56%
2006	42.41%
2001	55.29%
1996	51.63%
1991	52.33%
1990	51.00%
1985	56.48%
1980	61.09%
1977	44.53%
1974	46.00%
1969	50.99%
1964	51.40%

=== Assembly Election 2026 ===
2026 Puducherry Legislative Assembly election: Mannadipet
Party	Candidate	Votes	%	±%
BJP	A. Namassivayam	15,918	53.96	▲2.14
INC	T. P. R. Selvame	9,808	33.25	New
TVK	K. Bharathidasan	3,032	10.28	New
NOTA	None of the above	164	0.56	▼0.94
Margin of victory		6,110	20.71	▲11.17
Turnout		29502		
Rejected ballots				
Registered electors		31,113		
BJP hold		Swing		

=== Assembly Election 2021 ===
2021 Puducherry Legislative Assembly election: Mannadipet
Party	Candidate	Votes	%	±%
BJP	A. Namassivayam	14,939	51.82	51.05
DMK	A. Krishnan	12,189	42.28	15.96
NOTA	Nota	433	1.50	0.36
MNM	P. Gopalakrishnan	238	0.83	
Independent	Veerappan	182	0.63	
Margin of victory		2,750	9.54	8.02
Turnout		28,830	89.10	−0.73
Registered electors		32,357		5.37
BJP gain from AINRC		Swing	23.98	

=== Assembly Election 2016 ===
2016 Puducherry Legislative Assembly election: Mannadipet
Party	Candidate	Votes	%	±%
AINRC	T. P. R. Selvame	7,679	27.84	
DMK	A. Krishnan	7,260	26.32	
AIADMK	Mahadevi	5,676	20.58	
Independent	K. P. K. Arul Murugan	4,913	17.81	
Independent	Candane Naarayanassaamy	784	2.84	
NOTA	None of the Above	316	1.15	
PMK	Venkatesan	260	0.94	−29.79
DMDK	M. Karthikeyan	220	0.80	
BJP	Sadhasivam @ Saravanan	211	0.76	0.14
Margin of victory		419	1.52	−17.31
Turnout		27,586	89.83	−0.01
Registered electors		30,709		10.15
AINRC hold		Swing	-21.72	

=== Assembly Election 2011 ===
2011 Puducherry Legislative Assembly election: Mannadipet
Party	Candidate	Votes	%	±%
AINRC	T. P. R. Selvame	12,412	49.56	
PMK	K. P. K. Arul Murugan	7,696	30.73	−11.68
Independent	N. Rajaram	4,082	16.30	
Independent	D. Gunashakaran	329	1.31	
BJP	M. Latchumanan	156	0.62	−0.06
JD(U)	Pa. Vadivelan	152	0.61	
Independent	V. Muruganandham	127	0.51	
Margin of victory		4,716	18.83	9.48
Turnout		25,045	89.84	−0.17
Registered electors		27,878		29.89
AINRC gain from PMK		Swing	7.15	

=== Assembly Election 2006 ===
2006 Pondicherry Legislative Assembly election: Mannadipet
Party	Candidate	Votes	%	±%
PMK	P. Arulmurugan	8,193	42.41	
Independent	N. Rajaram	6,386	33.06	
AIADMK	Venkateswaran @ Baskaran	3,611	18.69	−36.59
DMDK	A. Muthu	386	2.00	
Independent	M. Latchumanan	372	1.93	
BJP	S. Thasaraman	131	0.68	
Margin of victory		1,807	9.35	−19.73
Turnout		19,317	90.01	10.92
Registered electors		21,462		4.98
PMK gain from AIADMK		Swing	-12.87	

=== Assembly Election 2001 ===
2001 Pondicherry Legislative Assembly election: Mannadipet
Party	Candidate	Votes	%	±%
AIADMK	D. Ramachandran	8,939	55.29	
INC	N. Rajaram	4,237	26.21	−17.49
PMC	S. Srinivasan	2,689	16.63	
Independent	C. Neelakandan	303	1.87	
Margin of victory		4,702	29.08	21.15
Turnout		16,168	79.09	1.22
Registered electors		20,444		3.68
AIADMK gain from TMC(M)		Swing	2.96	

=== Assembly Election 1996 ===
1996 Pondicherry Legislative Assembly election: Mannadipet
Party	Candidate	Votes	%	±%
TMC(M)	K. Rajasegaran	8,113	51.63	
INC	N. Rajaram	6,866	43.69	−8.63
Independent	R. Govindarajan	335	2.13	
BJP	N. Murugaiyan	175	1.11	0.13
Independent	S. Perumal	131	0.83	
Margin of victory		1,247	7.94	1.90
Turnout		15,714	82.77	4.90
Registered electors		19,718		1.26
TMC(M) gain from INC		Swing	-0.70	

=== Assembly Election 1991 ===
1991 Pondicherry Legislative Assembly election: Mannadipet
Party	Candidate	Votes	%	±%
INC	N. Rajaram	7,771	52.33	
DMK	D. Ramachandran	6,874	46.29	−4.71
BJP	N. Murugaiyan	146	0.98	
Margin of victory		897	6.04	−4.37
Turnout		14,851	77.87	−1.83
Registered electors		19,473		0.73
INC gain from DMK		Swing	1.33	

=== Assembly Election 1990 ===
1990 Pondicherry Legislative Assembly election: Mannadipet
Party	Candidate	Votes	%	±%
DMK	D. Ramachandran	7,802	51.00	−5.48
AIADMK	R. Somasundaram	6,210	40.59	
PMK	M. Krishnasamy Alias Sooram	1,201	7.85	
Margin of victory		1,592	10.41	−2.56
Turnout		15,299	79.70	−6.56
Registered electors		19,331		45.82
DMK hold		Swing	-5.48	

=== Assembly Election 1985 ===
1985 Pondicherry Legislative Assembly election: Mannadipet
Party	Candidate	Votes	%	±%
DMK	D. Ramachandran	6,383	56.48	−4.61
INC	A. Krishnasamy	4,918	43.52	
Margin of victory		1,465	12.96	−9.21
Turnout		11,301	86.26	−2.96
Registered electors		13,257		24.00
DMK hold		Swing	-4.61	

=== Assembly Election 1980 ===
1980 Pondicherry Legislative Assembly election: Mannadipet
Party	Candidate	Votes	%	±%
DMK	D. Ramachandran	5,598	61.09	54.17
AIADMK	S. Manickavachakan	3,566	38.91	−5.61
Margin of victory		2,032	22.17	2.05
Turnout		9,164	89.22	3.38
Registered electors		10,691		6.01
DMK gain from AIADMK		Swing	16.56	

=== Assembly Election 1977 ===
1977 Pondicherry Legislative Assembly election: Mannadipet
Party	Candidate	Votes	%	±%
AIADMK	D. Ramachandran	3,824	44.53	−1.47
JP	N. Rajaram Reddiar	2,096	24.41	
INC	P. Rajaram	2,074	24.15	
DMK	S. Selvarasu	594	6.92	−18.80
Margin of victory		1,728	20.12	2.41
Turnout		8,588	85.84	−6.04
Registered electors		10,085		18.56
AIADMK hold		Swing	-1.47	

=== Assembly Election 1974 ===
1974 Pondicherry Legislative Assembly election: Mannadipet
Party	Candidate	Votes	%	±%
AIADMK	D. Ramachandran	3,467	46.00	
INC(O)	Kannappan	2,132	28.29	
DMK	K. Rajaram	1,938	25.71	−25.28
Margin of victory		1,335	17.71	0.46
Turnout		7,537	91.88	3.85
Registered electors		8,506		6.69
AIADMK gain from DMK		Swing	-4.99	

=== Assembly Election 1969 ===
1969 Pondicherry Legislative Assembly election: Mannadipet
Party	Candidate	Votes	%	±%
DMK	S. M. Subbarayan	3,499	50.99	
INC	D. Kannappan	2,315	33.74	−17.66
Independent	T. Virappan	1,000	14.57	
Independent	K. S. Shanmuga Cavoundar	48	0.70	
Margin of victory		1,184	17.25	−13.59
Turnout		6,862	88.02	3.66
Registered electors		7,973		0.77
DMK gain from INC		Swing	-0.40	

=== Assembly Election 1964 ===
1964 Pondicherry Legislative Assembly election: Mannadipet
Party	Candidate	Votes	%	±%
INC	Manickavasaga Reddiar	3,369	51.40	
IPF	M. Venugopal	1,347	20.55	
Independent	M. Subbarayan	1,049	16.00	
Independent	M. Palani	534	8.15	
Independent	S. Natarajan	256	3.91	
Margin of victory		2,022	30.85	
Turnout		6,555	84.37	
Registered electors		7,912		
INC win (new seat)				
