= V. P. Sivakolundhu =

Indian politician

Hon'ble Civil Supplies & Consumer Affairs Minister Government of Puducherry
- Incumbent
- Assumed office 2026

Member of Puducherry Legislative Assembly
- Incumbent
- Assumed office 2026
- Constituency: Lawspet
- In office 2016–2021
- Preceded by: M. Vaithianathan
- Constituency: Lawspet

Speaker of Puducherry Legislative Assembly
- In office 2019–2021
- Preceded by: V. Vaithilingam
- Constituency: Lawspet

Personal details
- Born: V. P. Sivakolundhu
- Party: All India N. R. Congress (from 2025)
- Other political affiliations: Indian National Congress (till 2025)

V. P. Sivakolundhu is an Indian politician from the Union Territory of Puducherry, currently serving as a Minister in the Government of Puducherry. He was elected to the Puducherry Legislative Assembly from Lawspet, Puducherry in the 2026 Puducherry Legislative Assembly election as a member of the NR Congress. 2016 Puducherry Legislative Assembly election as a member of the Indian National Congress. He was elected as Speaker of Puducherry Legislative Assembly after V. Vaithilingam was elected to Lok Sabha in 2019.

In 2025, he switched his allegiance to the All India N.R. Congress (AINRC), a constituent of the National Democratic Alliance (NDA). Contesting on an AINRC ticket, he won the Lawspet constituency in the May 2026 Puducherry Legislative Assembly election, defeating the incumbent Congress candidate M. Vaithianathan by a margin of 1,417 votes. Following the AINRC-led NDA's victory, he was sworn in as a Minister on June 17, 2026.
