= A. Namassivayam =

Indian politician

A Namassivayam
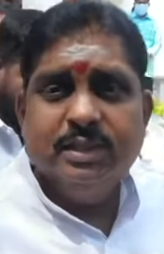

Minister of Home Affairs Government of Puducherry
- Incumbent
- Assumed office 8 May 2021
- Chief Minister: N. Rangaswamy
- Preceded by: V. Narayanasamy

Minister of Sports and Youth Affairs Government of Puducherry
- Incumbent
- Assumed office 8 May 2021
- Chief Minister: N. Rangaswamy
- Preceded by: Malladi Krishna Rao

Member Of Puducherry Legislative Assembly
- Incumbent
- Assumed office 2 May 2021
- Preceded by: T. P. R. Selvame
- Constituency: Mannadipet
- In office 13 May 2011 – 2 May 2021
- Preceded by: J. Narayanasamy
- Succeeded by: R. Siva
- Constituency: Villianur
- In office 13 May 2001 – 13 May 2011
- Preceded by: K. Natarajan
- Succeeded by: N.G. Pannirselvam
- Constituency: Ozhukarai

Personal details
- Born: Pondichéry, French India (now Puducherry, India)
- Party: Bharatiya Janata Party
- Other political affiliations: Former parties: Indian National Congress

Arumugam Namassivayam is an Indian politician from the Bharatiya Janata Party. He is current Home Minister of Puducherry. He is also serving as minister of Sports and Youth Affairs in Rangaswamy ministry. He represents Mannadipet in Puducherry Legislative Assembly.

== Political career ==
He was the ex-president of Puducherry Pradesh Congress Committee. On January 25, 2021, he was suspended from the Congress party for his anti-party activities. Following that Namassivayam submitted his MLA resignation letter to the assembly speaker and quit Congress party. He joined Bharathiya Janata Party along with his supporter Theeppainthan on 28 January 2021 in the presence of its national general secretary Arun Singh.He won from Mannadipet on a BJP ticket by 2,750 votes defeating DMK candidate A Krishan and is the current home and sports minister of Puducherry government in Fourth Rangaswamy ministry. In 2024, he contested from Puducherry Lok Sabha constituency as a BJP candidate with AINRC support and finished as runner up.
