= P. Rajavelu =

Indian politician

Deputy Speaker of Puducherry Legislative Assembly
- Incumbent
- Assumed office May 2021
- Speaker: Embalam R. Selvam
- Preceded by: V. Vizeaveny
- Constituency: Nettapakkam (constituency)

Personal details
- Party: All India NR Congress
- Education: 12th Pass
- Profession: Real Estate

P. Rajavelu is an Indian politician from All India NR Congress who is serving as Deputy Speaker of Puducherry Legislative Assembly. He was elected as a member of the Puducherry Legislative Assembly from Nettapakkam (constituency). He defeated V. Vijayaveny of Indian National Congress by 6,638 votes in 2021 Puducherry Assembly election.
