= All India N. R. Congress =

Political party in Puducherry, India

- Abbreviation: AINRC
- President: N. Rangaswamy
- General Secretary: N. S. Jayabal
- Founder: N. Rangaswamy
- Founded: 7 February 2011; 15 years ago
- Split from: Indian National Congress
- Headquarters: 65/6, E.C.R. Salai, Pakkamudayanpet, Pondicherry – 605008, Puducherry, India.
- Student wing: G. Sivakumar
- Women's wing: B. Jayalakshmi
- Labour wing: S. Ramesh
- Peasant's wing: V. Sabapathy (Kothandaraman)
- ECI status: State Party
- Alliance: NDA (2014–2016) (2019–present); AIADMK+ (2011–2014, 2021–2023 and 2025–present)
- Seats in Rajya Sabha: 0 / 245
- Seats in Lok Sabha: 0 / 543
- Seats in Puducherry Legislative Assembly: 12 / 33
- Number of states and union territories in government: 1 / 31

Election symbol

Party flag
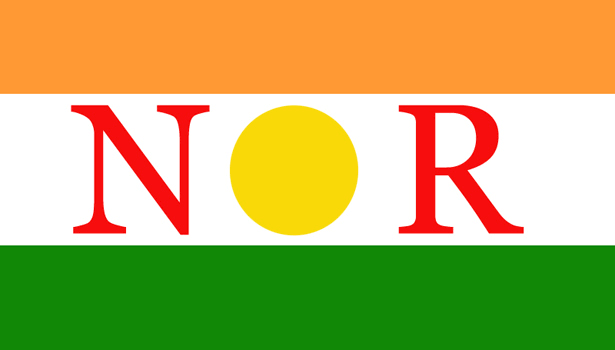

Website
- allindianrcongress.com

The All India N. R. Congress (abbr. AINRC) is a regional political party formed by the Chief Minister of Puducherry, N. Rangaswamy in the Indian union territory of Puducherry. He announced the party formation on 7 February 2011 in the party's head office in Pondicherry as a breakaway from the Indian National Congress. It contested the 2011 elections by allying with AIADMK and won the majority. Since 2014, it is part of the National Democratic Alliance led by the Bharatiya Janata Party (BJP). The NDA alliance won the majority in the 2021 and 2026 elections and is currently the ruling party of the union territory.

The party's official website states expansion of "N. R." in the party's name as 'நமது ராஜ்ஜியம்' (Namatu rājjiyam, lit. 'our rule'). These letters are also the initials of the party founder N. Rangasamy. The party's official motto is Simplicity, Fairness and Transparency.

== 2011 Assembly elections ==
In the 2011 assembly election, the AINRC is allied with J. Jayalalithaa's All India Anna Dravida Munnetra Kazhagam (AIADMK). Rangasamy formed the government by winning 15 seats in the election without consulting the AIADMK and refusing to share power with the pre-election alliance partner. So Jayalalithaa accused Rangasamy of betraying the coalition.

== 2014 Lok Sabha election ==
Chief Minister N. Rangaswamy announced that R. Radhakrishnan, former Speaker of Puducherry Assembly, would be the AINRC candidate for the Puducherry constituency for 2014 Lok Sabha Election. Radhakrishnan won the lone Lok Sabha seat from Puducherry.

== 2016 Assembly elections ==
AINRC won eight seats in the 2016 Puducherry Legislative Assembly election while Congress emerged as the single largest party with 15 seats. Therefore, Congress, along with Dravida Munnetra Kazhagam which won two seats, formed the government.

== 2019 Lok Sabha election ==
The 2019 Indian general election was held in seven phases from 11 April to 19 May 2019 to constitute the 17th Lok Sabha. Polling for the lone Puducherry Lok Sabha constituency was held on 18 April 2019.

The All India N. R. Congress (AINRC), as part of the National Democratic Alliance (NDA), fielded K. Narayanasamy from the Puducherry constituency. He contested against V. Vaithilingam of the Indian National Congress (INC), the candidate of the United Progressive Alliance (UPA).

AINRC contested the sole Lok Sabha seat in Puducherry but was defeated by the INC. Narayanasamy received 247,956 votes, accounting for 31.36% of the total votes, while Vaithilingam secured 444,981 votes and 56.27% of the vote share. As a result, AINRC lost the lone Lok Sabha seat that it had won in the previous general election.

== 2021 Assembly elections ==
AINRC along with BJP won a clear majority of seats in the 2021 Puducherry Legislative Assembly election which paved way for the NDA to form a government in the Union Territory for the first time.

== 2024 Lok Sabha election ==
Chief Minister N Rangaswamy announced that AINRC would not field its candidate and support the BJP candidate.

== 2026 Assembly election ==
In the 2026 Puducherry Legislative Assembly election, the All India N. R. Congress (AINRC) remained a constituent of the National Democratic Alliance (NDA) and contested 16 seats. The party improved its tally by two seats compared with the 2021 election, winning 12 seats and emerging as the largest party in the alliance.

The NDA, led by AINRC leader and Chief Minister N. Rangasamy, won 18 of the 30 seats in the Puducherry Legislative Assembly and secured a majority. Of the NDA's seats, the AINRC won 12, while the Bharatiya Janata Party (BJP) won four seats. The All India Anna Dravida Munnetra Kazhagam (AIADMK) and the Latchiya Jananayaga Katchi (LJK) won one seat each.

Rangasamy contested from the Thattanchavady and Mangalam constituencies and won both seats. In Thattanchavady, he defeated Neyam Makkal Kazhagam candidate E. Vinayagam by a margin of 4,441 votes. In Mangalam, he defeated Dravida Munnetra Kazhagam (DMK) candidate S. S. Rangan by 7,050 votes.

The election result enabled the NDA to retain its majority in the Union Territory, with the AINRC continuing as the leading party in the coalition.

== Electoral performance ==
=== Indian general elections ===
Lok Sabha Elections
Year	Lok Sabha	Party leader	Seats contested	Seats won	Change in seats	Percentage of votes	Vote swing	Popular vote	Outcome
2014	16th	N. Rangasamy	1	1 / 543	▲1	0.04%	Steady	255,826	Government
2019	17th	N. Rangasamy	1	0 / 543	▼1	0.04%	Steady	247,956	Lost

=== State legislative assembly elections ===
Puducherry Legislative Assembly Elections
Year	Assembly	Party leader	Seats contested	Seats won	Change in seats	Percentage of votes	Vote swing	Popular vote	Outcome
2011	13th	N. Rangasamy	17	15 / 30	▲15	31.75%	Steady	221,552	Government
2016	14th	N. Rangasamy	30	8 / 30	▼7	28.12%	▼3.63%	225,082	Opposition
2021	15th	N. Rangasamy	16	10 / 30	▲2	25.85%	▼2.27%	216,249	Coalition Government
2026	16th	N. Rangasamy	16	11 / 30	▲1	23.12%	▼2.73%	200,292	Coalition Government

== List of party leaders ==
=== Presidents ===
No.	Portrait	Name (Birth–Death)	Term in office		
No.	Portrait	Name (Birth–Death)	Assumed office	Left office	Time in office
1		N. Rangaswamy (1950–)	7 February 2011	Incumbent	15 years, 283 days

== Legislative leaders ==
=== List of chief ministers ===
==== Chief ministers of Puducherry ====
No.	Portrait	Name (Birth–Death)	Term in office			Assembly (Election)	Constituency	Ministry
No.	Portrait	Name (Birth–Death)	Assumed office	Left office	Time in office	Assembly (Election)	Constituency	Ministry
1		N. Rangaswamy (1950–)	16 May 2011	5 June 2016	10 years, 214 days	13th (2011)	Kadirkamam	Rangasamy III
1		N. Rangaswamy (1950–)	7 May 2021	Incumbent	10 years, 214 days	15th (2021)	Thattanchavady	Rangasamy IV
1		N. Rangaswamy (1950–)	7 May 2021	Incumbent	10 years, 214 days	16th (2026)	Mangalam	Rangasamy V

=== List of speakers ===
==== Speakers of the Puducherry Legislative Assembly ====
No.	Portrait	Name (Birth–Death)	Term in office			Assembly (Election)	Constituency
No.	Portrait	Name (Birth–Death)	Assumed office	Left office	Time in office	Assembly (Election)	Constituency
1		V. Sabapathy (1944–)	29 June 2011	21 May 2016	4 years, 327 days	13th (2011)	Ariankuppam

=== List of deputy speakers ===
==== Deputy speakers of the Puducherry Legislative Assembly ====
No.	Portrait	Name (Birth–Death)	Term in office			Assembly (Election)	Constituency	Speaker
No.	Portrait	Name (Birth–Death)	Assumed office	Left office	Time in office	Assembly (Election)	Constituency	Speaker
1		T. P. R. Selvame (1971–)	3 November 2011	21 May 2016	4 years, 200 days	13th (2011)	Mannadipet	V. Sabapathy
2		P. Rajavelu (1961–)	26 August 2021	Incumbent	5 years, 83 days	15th (2021)	Nettapakkam	Embalam R. Selvam

=== List of leaders of the opposition ===
==== Leaders of the Opposition in the Puducherry Legislative Assembly ====
No.	Portrait	Name (Birth–Death)	Term in office			Assembly (Election)	Constituency
No.	Portrait	Name (Birth–Death)	Assumed office	Left office	Time in office	Assembly (Election)	Constituency
1		N. Rangaswamy (1950–)	24 August 2016	22 February 2021	4 years, 182 days	14th (2016)	Indira Nagar

=== List of deputy leaders of the opposition ===
==== Deputy leaders of the Opposition in the Puducherry Legislative Assembly ====
No.	Portrait	Name (Birth–Death)	Term in office			Assembly (Election)	Constituency	Leader of the Opposition
No.	Portrait	Name (Birth–Death)	Assumed office	Left office	Time in office	Assembly (Election)	Constituency	Leader of the Opposition
1		P. R. N. Thirumurugan (1972–)	24 August 2016	22 February 2021	4 years, 182 days	14th (2016)	Karaikal North	N. Rangasamy

== See also ==
- List of political parties in India
