= Fourth Rangaswamy ministry =

Former government of Puducherry, India

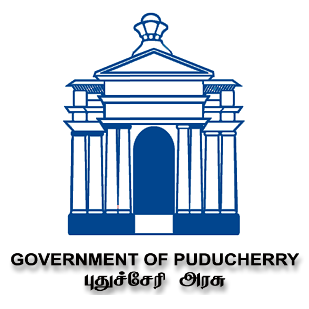
- 19th Ministry of Puducherry
- 2021 – 2026
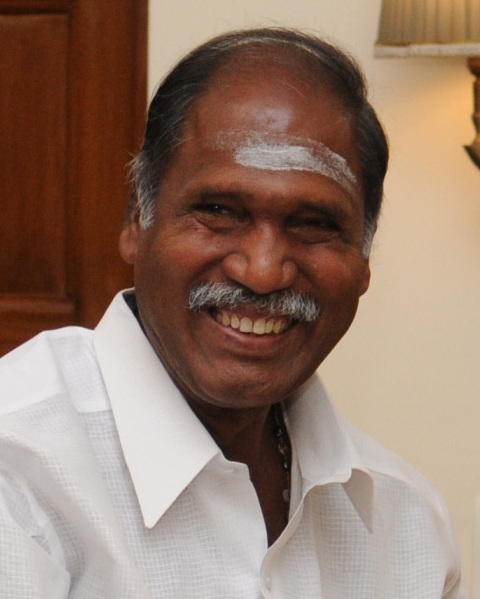
- N. Rangaswamy
- Date formed: 7 May 2021
- Date dissolved: 13 May 2026

People and organisations
- Lt. Governor: Tamilisai Soundararajan; C. P. Radhakrishnan; Kuniyil Kailashnathan
- Chief Minister: N. Rangaswamy
- No. of ministers: 6
- Ministers removed: 2
- Total no. of members: 6
- Member parties: All India N.R. Congress (10); Bharatiya Janata Party (9); Independents (5)
- Status in legislature: Majority (Coalition)
- Opposition party: Dravida Munnetra Kazhagam
- Opposition leader: R. Siva

History
- Election: 2021
- Outgoing election: 2026
- Legislature term: 2021–2026
- Predecessor: Narayanasamy ministry
- Successor: Fifth Rangaswamy ministry

After the National Democratic Alliance won the 2021 Puducherry Legislative Assembly election, N. Rangaswamy was sworn in as Chief Minister of Puducherry on 7 May 2021. The cabinet consisted of five ministers (excluding the chief minister)) with three from the All India N.R. Congress and two from the Bharatiya Janata Party.

== Council of Ministers ==
S.No	Name	Constituency	Department		Party
1.	N. Rangaswamy; Chief Minister (since 7 June 2021)	Thattanchavady	Finance; Planning; Port; General Administration; Local Administration; Revenue & Excise; Health & Family Welfare; Confidential & Cabinet	Cooperation; Hindu Religious Institutions; Wakf Board; Science, Technology & Environment; Information & Publicity; Town & Country Planning; Any other Department not allotted to any other Minister.	AINRC
Cabinet Ministers
2.	A. Namassivayam (since 27 June 2021)	Mannadipet	Home; Electricity; Industries & Commerce	Education including Collegiate Education; Sports & Youth Affairs; Sainik Welfare	BJP
3.	K. Lakshminarayanan (since 27 June 2021)	Raj Bhavan	Public Works; Tourism & Civil Aviation; Fisheries & Fishermen Welfare	Law; Information Technology; Stationery & Printing	AINRC
4.	C. Djeacoumar (since 27 June 2021)	Mangalam	Agriculture; Animal Husbandry & Animal Welfare; Forest & Wildlife	Social Welfare; Backward Class Welfare; Women & Child Development	AINRC
5.	P. R. N. Thirumurugan (since 14 March 2024)	Karaikal North	Transport; Adi Dravidar Welfare; Housing	Labour & Employment; Art & Culture; Economics & Statistics	AINRC
6.	A. Johnkumar (since 14 July 2025)	Kamraj Nagar	Civil Supplies & Consumer Affairs; DRDA; Community Development	Fire Services; Minority Affairs	BJP

== Previous Cabinet Ministers ==
Sr. No.	Name	Constituency	Portfolio	Party	Term of office		
Sr. No.	Name	Constituency	Portfolio	Party	Took office	Left office	Duration
Cabinet Ministers
1.	Chandira Priyanga	Nedungadu	Transport; Adi Dravidar Welfare; Housing; Labour & Employment; Art & Culture; Economics & Statistics	AINRC	27 June 2021	10 October 2023	2 years, 104 days
2.	A. K. Sai J. Saravanan Kumar	Ossudu	Civil Supplies & Consumer Affairs; DRDA; Community Development; Urban Basic Services; Fire Services; Minority Affairs	BJP	27 June 2021	28 June 2025	4 years, 0 days
