= Puducherry Lok Sabha constituency =

Lok Sabha Constituency in Puducherry

Puducherry PY-1
- Lok Sabha constituency
- Interactive Map Outlining Puducherry Lok Sabha constituency

Constituency details
- Country: India
- Region: South India
- Union Territory: Puducherry
- Assembly constituencies: 30: Mannadipet, Thirubuvanai, Ossudu, Mangalam, Villianur, Ozhukarai, Kadirkamam, Indira Nagar, Thattanchavady, Kamaraj Nagar, Lawspet, Kalapett, Muthialpet, Raj Bhavan, Oupalam, Orleampeth, Nellithope, Mudaliarpet, Ariankuppam, Manavely, Embalam, Nettapakkam, Bahour, Nedungadu, Thirunallar, Karaikal North, Karaikal South, Neravy T R Pattinam, Mahe and Yanam
- Established: 1967
- Total electors: 10,23,699 (2024)
- Reservation: None

Member of Parliament
- 18th Lok Sabha
- Incumbent V. Vaithilingam
- Party: INC
- Alliance: INDIA
- Elected year: 2024

Puducherry Lok Sabha constituency covers the entire Union Territory of Puducherry. Pondicherry became a union territory after the implementation of the Fourteenth Amendment of the Constitution of India in 1962 and changed its name to Puducherry in 2006. This constituency first held elections in 1967 and its first member of parliament (MP) was Thirumudi N. Sethuraman of the Indian National Congress.

== History of the constituency ==
Sethuraman represented the Indian National Congress (Organisation) in the 1971 election, which he lost to Mohan Kumaramangalam of the INC. The next election in 1977 was won by Aravinda Bala Pajanor of the All India Anna Dravida Munnetra Kazhagam (AIADMK). P. Shanmugam of the INC won the 1980 election and was re-elected in 1984 and 1989. M. O. H. Farook also of the INC served two terms from 1991 to 1998. In the 1998 election, S. Arumugham of the Dravida Munnetra Kazhagam (DMK) was elected as MP. Farook was re-elected in 1999 to serve a third term as MP. The next election in 2004 was won by M. Ramadass of the Pattali Makkal Katchi (PMK). V. Narayanasamy of the INC was elected in 2009 and was defeated in the next election in 2014 by R. Radhakrishnan of the All India N.R. Congress. Radhakrishnan's victory was the first time that the Lok Sabha seat was won by a member of a Puducherry regional party. In the 2019 Lok Sabha elections Indian National Congress candidate V. Vaithilingam defeated All India N.R. Congress candidate Dr. Narayanasamy Kesavan by a record margin of 1,97,025 votes, this margin is the highest in the electoral history of Puducherry Parliamentary Constituency. In the 2024 Lok Sabha elections Indian National Congress candidate V. Vaithilingam defeated Bharatiya Janata Party candidate A. Namassivayam by 1,36,516 votes, a reduced margin. Indian National Congress is the most successful party in this constituency by winning 10 out of 14 elections, in the other 4 elections, 2 times in 1977 and 2004 Indian National Congress party's alliance partners All India Anna Dravida Munnetra Kazhagam (AIADMK) and Pattali Makkal Katchi (PMK) won respectively. 1 time in 2014, Bharatiya Janata Party's alliance partner All India N.R. Congress won.

Prior to independence, the colony sent a member to the French National Assembly.

== Assembly segments ==
The constituency presently comprises all the thirty segments of the Puducherry Legislative Assembly.

Constituency number	Name	MLA	Party	Party Leading (in 2024)
Puducherry District
1	Mannadipet	A. Namassivayam	BJP	INC
2	Thirubuvanai	A. K. Sai J. Saravanan Kumar	TVK	INC
3	Ossudu	P. Karthikeyan	INC	INC
4	Mangalam	N. Rangaswamy	AINRC	INC
5	Villianur	B. Ravicoumar	AINRC	INC
6	Ozhukarai	K. Narayanasamy	AINRC	INC
7	Kadirkamam	Azhagu	IND	INC
8	Indira Nagar	A. K. D. Arumugam	AINRC	BJP
9	Thattanchavady	Vacant	AINRC	INC
10	Kamaraj Nagar	Jose Charles Martin	LJK	INC
11	Lawspet	V. P. Sivakolundhu	AINRC	INC
12	Kalapet	Senthil	DMK	INC
13	Muthialpet	Vaiyapuri Manikandan	AINRC	INC
14	Raj Bhavan	Vignesh Kannan	DMK	INC
15	Oupalam	A. Anbalagan	AIADMK	INC
16	Orleampeth	G. Nehru Kuppusamy	NMK	INC
17	Nellithope	V. Cartigueyane	DMK	INC
18	Mudaliarpet	A. Johnkumar	BJP	INC
19	Ariankuppam	C. Aiyappan	AINRC	INC
20	Manavely	B. Ramu	TVK	INC
21	Embalam	E. Mohandoss	AINRC	INC
22	Nettapakkam	P. Rajavelu	AINRC	INC
23	Bahour	R Senthilkumar	DMK	INC
Karaikal District
24	Nedungadu	V. Vigneswaran	IND	INC
25	Thirunallar	G. N. S. Rajasekaran	BJP	INC
26	Karaikal North	P. R. N. Thirumurugan	AINRC	INC
27	Karaikal South	A. M. H. Nazeem	DMK	INC
28	Neravy T R Pattinam	T. K. S. M. Meenatchisundaram	BJP	INC
Mahe District
29	Mahe	Adv. T. Ashok Kumar	IND	INC
Yanam District
30	Yanam	Malladi Krishna Rao	AINRC	BJP

== Members of Parliament ==
Election	Member	Party
1967	Thirumudi N. Sethuraman	Indian National Congress
1971	Mohan Kumaramangalam	Indian National Congress
1977	Aravinda Bala Pajanor	All India Anna Dravida Munnetra Kazhagam
1980	P. Shanmugam	Indian National Congress
1984	P. Shanmugam	Indian National Congress
1989	P. Shanmugam	Indian National Congress
1991	M. O. H. Farook	Indian National Congress
1996	M. O. H. Farook	Indian National Congress
1998	S. Arumugham	Dravida Munnetra Kazhagam
1999	M. O. H. Farook	Indian National Congress
2004	M. Ramadass	Pattali Makkal Katchi
2009	V. Narayanasamy	Indian National Congress
2014	R. Radhakrishnan	All India N.R. Congress
2019	V. Vaithilingam	Indian National Congress
2024	V. Vaithilingam	Indian National Congress

== Election results ==
Vote share of Winning candidates
2024	52.73%
2019	56.27%
2014	34.57%
2009	49.67%
2004	51.49%
1999	37.17%
1998	41.11%
1996	39.97%
1991	53.07%
1989	50.47%
1984	58.86%
1980	66.45%
1977	53.32%
1971	66.27%
1967	39.83%

=== 2024 ===
2024 Indian general election : Puducherry
Party	Candidate	Votes	%	±%
INC	V. Vaithilingam	426,005	52.73	▼3.54
BJP	A. Namassivayam	289,489	35.83	
AIADMK	G. Thamizhvendhan	25,165	3.11	N/A
NOTA	None of the above	9,763	1.21	▼0.33
IND	19 Independent Candidates	13,320	1.65	
OTH	3 Other Party Candidates	4,595	0.57	
Margin of victory		136,516	16.90	▼8.01
Turnout		807,940	78.92	▼2.33
Registered electors		1,023,699		
INC hold		Swing	-3.54	

=== 2019 ===
2019 Indian general election: Puducherry
Party	Candidate	Votes	%	±%
INC	V. Vaithilingam	444,981	56.27	
AINRC	Dr. Narayanasamy Kesavan	247,956	31.36	
MNM	Dr. M. A. S. Subramanian	38,068	4.81	
NOTA	None of the Above	12,199	1.54	
IND	8 Independent Candidates	15,626	1.98	
OTH	6 Other Party Candidates	9,073	1.15	
Majority		197,025	24.91	
Turnout		790,895	81.25	
Swing to INC from AINRC		Swing		

=== 2014 ===
2014 Indian general election: Puducherry
Party	Candidate	Votes	%	±%
AINRC	R. Radhakrishnan	255,826	34.57	
INC	V. Narayanasamy	194,972	26.35	
AIADMK	M. V. Omalingam	132,657	17.93	
DMK	A. M. H. Nazeem	60,580	8.19	
PMK	R. K. R. Anantharaman	22,754	3.07	
CPI	R. Viswanathan	12,709	1.72	
AAP	Dr. V. Rangarajan	8,307	1.12	
BSP	S. Krishnamoorthy	2,060	0.28	
CPI(ML)L	G. Palani	438	0.06	
SAP	Marie Uthrianathan	366	0.05	
JD(U)	S. Chitrakala	309	0.04	
IND	19 Independent Candidates	26,771	3.62	
NOTA	None of the Above	22,268	3.01	
Majority		60,854	8.22	
Turnout		790,895	81.25	
Swing to AINRC from INC		Swing		

=== 2009 ===
2009 Indian general election: Puducherry
Party	Candidate	Votes	%	±%
INC	V. Narayanasamy	300,391	49.67	
PMK	M. Ramadass	208,619	34.49	
DMDK	K. A. U. Asanaa	52,638	8.70	
BJP	M. Visweswaran	13,442	2.22	
BSP	M. Somasundaram	3,697	0.61	
IND	18 Independent Candidates	26,013	4.30	
Majority		91,772	15.18	
Turnout		607,948	79.74	
Swing to INC from PMK		Swing		

=== 2004 ===
2004 Indian general election: Pondicherry
Party	Candidate	Votes	%	±%
PMK	M. Ramadass	241,653	51.49	
BJP	Lalitha Kumaramangalam	172,472	36.75	
JD(U)	K. Nambiyar	27,546	5.87	
JP	S. Ponnurangam	1,601	0.34	
CPI(ML)L	S. Balasubramanian	1,359	0.29	
RJD	G. Sundaramoorthy	1,328	0.28	
IND	10 Independent Candidates	23,360	4.98	
Majority		69,181	14.74	
Turnout		483,816	76.07	
Swing to PMK from INC		Swing		

=== 1999 ===
1999 Indian general election: Pondicherry
Party	Candidate	Votes	%	±%
INC	M. O. H. Farook	165,108	37.17	
PMK	M. Ramadass	140,920	31.73	
TMC(M)	P. Kannan	111,737	25.16	
IND	6 Independent Candidates	26,397	5.95	
Majority		24,188	5.44	
Turnout		444,174	63.27	
Swing to INC from DMK		Swing		

=== 1998 ===
1998 Indian general election: Pondicherry
Party	Candidate	Votes	%	±%
DMK	S. Arumugham	168,122	41.11	
INC	P. Shanmugam	131,348	32.12	
AIADMK	Lucky R. Perumal	102,622	25.10	
BSP	S. K. C. Guedjendirane	2,589	0.63	
RJD	T. Sanjeevi	1,397	0.34	
IC(S)	D. Deenadhayalan	1,222	0.30	
AJBP (Note: Ajeya Bharat Party)	Balasami	736	0.18	
IND	R. Sadhasivam	709	0.17	
IND	G. Sarangam	173	0.04	
Majority		36,774	8.99	
Turnout		417,786	62.78	
Swing to DMK from INC		Swing		

=== 1996 ===
1996 Indian general election: Pondicherry
Party	Candidate	Votes	%	±%
INC	M. O. H. Farook	183,986	39.97	
DMK	S. Arumugham	183,702	39.91	
BJP	S. Thiyagarajan	20,351	4.42	
PMK	Bavany Madura Cavy	19,792	4.30	
MDMK	R. Balasubramanian	13,397	2.91	
BSP	S. K. C. Guedjendirane	4,005	0.87	
IC(S)	D. Deenadayalan	3,819	0.83	
JP	L. Vengataraman	1,823	0.40	
IND	13 Independent Candidates	29,447	6.40	
Majority		284	0.06	
Turnout		477,437	75.35	
INC hold		Swing		

=== 1991 ===
1991 Indian general election: Pondicherry
Party	Candidate	Votes	%	±%
INC	M. O. H. Farook	207,922	53.07	
DMK	P. K. Lognathan	140,313	35.81	
PMK	Bavani Maduracavi	13,375	3.41	
BJP	J. R. Ramasami	7,728	1.97	
IND	4 Independent Candidates	10,092	2.57	
OTH	5 Other Party Candidates	12,353	3.15	
Majority		67,609	17.26	
Turnout		401,741	67.71	
INC hold		Swing		

=== 1989 ===
1989 Indian general election: Pondicherry
Party	Candidate	Votes	%	±%
INC	P. Shanmugam	190,562	50.47	
DMK	N. Manimaran	157,250	41.65	
PMK	Bavany Maduracayy	25,021	6.63	
LKD(B) (Note: Lok Dal (Bahuguna))	C. Balamuthuval	965	0.26	
TMM (Note: Tharasu Makkal Mandaram)	P. D. Panneer Salvan	943	0.25	
IND	6 Independent Candidates	2,847	0.75	
Majority		33,312	8.82	
Turnout		383,306	66.71	
INC hold		Swing		

=== 1984 ===
1984 Indian general election: Pondicherry
Party	Candidate	Votes	%	±%
INC	P. Shanmugam	159,376	58.86	
DMK	C. P. Thirunavukkarasu	97,672	36.07	
IC(S)	S. Sukumaran	1,794	0.66	
IND	7 Independent Candidates	11,939	4.42	
Majority		61,704	22.79	
Turnout		275,654	72.28	
Swing to INC from INC(I)		Swing		

=== 1980 ===
1980 Indian general election: Pondicherry
Party	Candidate	Votes	%	±%
INC(I)	P. Shanmugam	164,589	66.45	
JP	M. R. Lakshminarayanan	66,025	26.66	
JP(S)	P. Devaraj	17,067	6.89	
Majority		98,564	39.79	
Turnout		256,539	80.36	
Swing to INC(I) from AIADMK		Swing		

=== 1977 ===
1977 Indian general election: Pondicherry
Party	Candidate	Votes	%	±%
AIADMK	Aravinda Bala Pajanor	115,302	53.32	
INC(O)	Ansari Duraisamy	96,101	44.44	
IND	Ramu alias N. Subramanian	3,921	1.81	
IND	Gadjindra Baskar	920	0.43	
Majority		19,201	8.88	
Turnout		219,560	73.63	
Swing to AIADMK from INC		Swing		

=== 1971 ===
1971 Indian general election: Pondicherry
Party	Candidate	Votes	%	±%
INC	Mohan Kumaramangalam	112,714	66.27	
INC(O)	Thirumudi N. Sethuraman	47,550	27.96	
IND	A. Balasubramanian	6,745	3.97	
IND	D. Krishnasamy	3,079	1.81	
Majority		65,164	38.31	
Turnout		172,992	70.10	
INC hold		Swing		

=== 1967 ===
1967 Indian general election: Pondicherry
Party	Candidate	Votes	%	±%
INC	Thirumudi N. Sethuraman	63,286	39.83	
IND	S. Sadagopan	52,861	33.27	
PFR (Note: People's Front)	K. Subbiah	42,725	26.89	
Majority		10,425	6.56	
Turnout		162,193	74.85	
INC win (new seat)				

== See also ==
- List of constituencies of the Lok Sabha
- Puducherry Legislative Assembly
- List of chief ministers of Puducherry
- List of Rajya Sabha members from Puducherry
