= Santiago Martin =

Indian lottery businessman

Santiago Martin (born c. 1961) is an Indian businessman, widely referred to in Indian media as the "Lottery King". He is the founder and chairman of Future Gaming and Hotel Services Private Limited, India's largest lottery distribution company. Martin came to national prominence in March 2024 when Election Commission of India data, released on the orders of the Supreme Court of India, revealed that Future Gaming was the single largest purchaser of electoral bonds, buying bonds worth ₹1,368 crore between 2019 and 2024. Martin and his companies have been the subject of investigations by the Enforcement Directorate, the Income Tax Department, and the Central Bureau of Investigation in connection with alleged lottery fraud and money laundering, charges which he has contested in court.

== Early life ==
Santiago was born in Coimbatore, Tamil Nadu. In the 1980s, he travelled to Yangon, Myanmar to work as a daily-wage labourer. There he began running a small two-digit lottery operation. He returned to India and founded Martin Lottery Agencies Ltd in Coimbatore in 1988.

== Business career ==
Martin's business grew from a regional lottery distributorship into the largest lottery operation in India. After the Tamil Nadu government under Chief Minister J. Jayalalithaa banned lotteries in the state in 2003, Martin shifted his focus to other states, becoming a major distributor of government lotteries in Sikkim, Arunachal Pradesh, Mizoram, Nagaland, Punjab, Maharashtra, Kerala, and Karnataka, with operations also extending to Bhutan. A group company, Future Gaming Solutions India Pvt Ltd, has served as the master distributor of Sikkim state lotteries.

His flagship company, Future Gaming and Hotel Services Private Limited, is headquartered in Coimbatore. Beyond lotteries, the Martin group has diversified into real estate, hospitality, textiles, education, renewable energy, and media; the group's total valuation has been estimated at around ₹23,000 crore. Other companies associated with Martin include Martin Builders Pvt Ltd and Daison Land and Development Pvt Ltd.

Martin serves as president of the All India Federation of Lottery Trade and Allied Industries (AIFLTAI), an industry body for the lottery trade.

== Electoral bonds ==
In February 2024, the Supreme Court of India struck down the electoral bond scheme as unconstitutional and ordered the State Bank of India and the Election Commission of India to disclose details of all bond purchases. Data published in March 2024 showed that Future Gaming and Hotel Services was the largest single purchaser of electoral bonds, having bought bonds worth ₹1,368 crore between April 2019 and January 2024 — approximately 40 per cent more than the next-highest donor and roughly 11 per cent of all bonds sold during the period.

Subsequent disclosures of redemption data showed that the company's donations spanned the political spectrum: the All India Trinamool Congress received ₹542 crore, the Dravida Munnetra Kazhagam (DMK) ₹503 crore, the YSR Congress Party ₹154 crore, the Bharatiya Janata Party ₹100 crore, the Indian National Congress ₹50 crore, and smaller amounts went to the Sikkim Krantikari Morcha and Sikkim Democratic Front. Future Gaming was the largest disclosed donor to the DMK, accounting for about 77 per cent of the bonds the party reported receiving.

Media analyses noted the timing of the purchases relative to enforcement action against the company. The Hindu reported that half the bonds were bought before Enforcement Directorate searches against the company and half afterwards, and that one of the company's largest single-day purchases, worth ₹100 crore, came five days after the agency attached assets worth ₹410 crore in April 2022. Future Gaming did not respond to media requests for comment on its donations.

== Legal proceedings ==
Martin and his companies have faced investigations by multiple central and state agencies. He has reportedly faced CBI cases since 2007, and by 2015 had been named in lottery-related cases across several states, including Karnataka, Tamil Nadu, Kerala, Sikkim, Arunachal Pradesh, Punjab, Haryana, and Maharashtra. In 2011, he was arrested in Tamil Nadu in connection with an alleged land-grabbing case.

=== Sikkim lotteries case ===
A central strand of litigation concerns the alleged fraudulent sale of Sikkim government lotteries in Kerala, which investigators claim caused a loss of more than ₹900 crore to the Sikkim government. The Enforcement Directorate, which has investigated Martin under the Prevention of Money Laundering Act since 2019, attached assets worth approximately ₹457 crore in connection with the case. Members of the Martin family have contested the ED's jurisdiction, arguing that the agency's probe exceeded the scope of the CBI charge sheet, which concerned the alleged manipulation of prize-winning tickets.

=== Chennai cash seizure case ===
A separate case arose from the seizure of ₹7.2 crore in allegedly unaccounted cash from Martin's Chennai premises in 2012, suspected to be proceeds from the sale of lottery tickets banned in Tamil Nadu. The Chennai police Central Crime Branch filed a closure report in the case in 2022, which was accepted by a magistrate's court. In 2024, the Madras High Court set aside that order, ruling that the ED could continue to pursue prosecution even where another agency had closed the predicate offence. Following the ruling, the ED conducted fresh searches in November 2024 at premises linked to Martin across several cities, recovering ₹12.41 crore in cash.

=== Supreme Court proceedings ===
In December 2024, the Supreme Court of India granted interim relief to Martin by directing the ED to halt its examination of his seized electronic devices, after his counsel argued that unrestricted access to the devices violated privacy and fundamental rights. The court took up the matter as part of broader questions about investigative agencies' access to personal digital data.

Martin has not been convicted in these cases, and proceedings remain ongoing.

== Political connections ==
Martin was reported to be close to the DMK in the early 2000s, and in 2011 produced a film based on a script written by former Tamil Nadu Chief Minister M. Karunanidhi. Electoral bond disclosures later showed his company's donations were spread across rival parties at both the national and state level.

== Personal life ==
Several members of Martin's family entered electoral politics in the 2026 assembly elections, winning seats on three different political platforms, though Martin himself did not contest.

His wife, Leema Rose Martin, was elected to the Tamil Nadu Legislative Assembly from Lalgudi as an All India Anna Dravida Munnetra Kazhagam (AIADMK) candidate in the 2026 Tamil Nadu Legislative Assembly election, winning by a margin of 2,739 votes. His son, Jose Charles Martin, founded a new political party, the Latchiya Jananayaga Katchi (LJK), ahead of the 2026 Puducherry Legislative Assembly election and won the Kamaraj Nagar seat; he was reported to be the union territory's wealthiest candidate.

Martin's son-in-law, Aadhav Arjuna, a political strategist married to Martin's daughter Daisy Martin, joined the Tamilaga Vettri Kazhagam (TVK) in January 2025 as its general secretary for election campaign management, after earlier serving as deputy general secretary of the Viduthalai Chiruthaigal Katchi (VCK). Arjuna, who was reported to have been estranged from the Martin family, won the Villivakkam seat in the 2026 Tamil Nadu election by a margin of over 17,000 votes and became a cabinet minister in the TVK government led by Vijay.
