= R. Viswanathan =

R. Viswanathan may refer to:

- Natham R. Viswanathan, Indian politician and deputy general secretary of All India Anna Dravida Munnetra Kazhagam
- R. Viswanathan (CPI politician), Indian politician and leader of Communist Party of India
- R. Viswanathan (diplomat), Indian ambassador
