= Aadhav Arjuna =

Indian politician, political strategist and sports administrator

Minister for Public Works and Sports Development Government of Tamil Nadu
- Incumbent
- Assumed office 10 May 2026
- Governor: R. V. Arlekar
- Chief Minister: C. Joseph Vijay
- Ministry and Departments: Public works; Sports Development
- Preceded by: E. V. Velu As Public Works Department Minister; Udhayanidhi Stalin As Youth Welfare and Sports Development Minister

Member of the Tamil Nadu Legislative Assembly
- Incumbent
- Assumed office 10 May 2026
- Preceded by: A. Vetriazhagan (DMK)
- Constituency: Villivakkam

General Secretary (Election Campaign Management), Tamilaga Vettri Kazhagam
- Incumbent
- Assumed office 31 January 2025
- President: Vijay
- General Secretary: N. Anand
- Preceded by: Position established

Deputy General Secretary, Viduthalai Chiruthaigal Katchi
- In office 2023 – 15 December 2024
- President: Thol. Thirumavalavan

Personal details
- Born: April 12, 1982 (age 44) Tiruchirappalli, Tamil Nadu, India
- Party: Tamilaga Vettri Kazhagam (2025–present)
- Other political affiliations: Viduthalai Chiruthaigal Katchi (2023–2024) Dravida Munnetra Kazhagam (2020-2022)
- Spouse: Daisy Martin
- Parent: Rajendran (farmer) (father)
- Relatives: Santiago Martin (father in law); Leema Rose Martin (mother-in-law); Jose Charles Martin (brother-in law)
- Education: Ramakrishna Mission School, Trichy; Madras Christian College (BA and MA, Political Science)
- Occupation: Politician; political strategist; sports administrator; philanthropist
- Known for: TVK election strategy; President of Basketball Federation of India; son-in-law of Santiago Martin.

Aadhav Arjuna

Aadhav Arjuna (born 12 April 1982) is an Indian politician and political strategist from Tamil Nadu. He is the elected Member of Legislative Assembly (MLA) representing the Villivakkam assembly constituency in Chennai, having won the seat in the 2026 Tamil Nadu Legislative Assembly election. He serves as the General Secretary for Election Campaign Management of the Tamilaga Vettri Kazhagam (TVK), making him the highest-ranking party official after president Vijay and General Secretary N. Anand. He is also the President of the Basketball Federation of India.

== Early life and education ==
Arjuna was born on 12 April 1982 in Tiruchirappalli, Tamil Nadu, into a farming family. His father, Rajendran, was a farmer, and his mother, Kalyani, passed away when he was young, following which he was raised by his uncle, grandmother, and later his relative, Thilagavathi, who became the first female Indian Police Service (IPS) officer from Tamil Nadu.

He completed his schooling at YWCA (Co-ed) and Ramakrishna Mission School in Tiruchirappalli, where he developed a passion for basketball. He later moved to Chennai and earned both a bachelor's and a master's degree in Political Science from Madras Christian College, supported by a merit scholarship.

== Career ==
=== Basketball and sports administration ===
Arjuna began his career as a national-level basketball player representing Tamil Nadu. He transitioned into sports administration, serving as General Secretary of the Tamil Nadu Basketball Association in 2017 and later its President in 2021. In 2023, he was elected President of the Basketball Federation of India (BFI).

=== Political consultancy ===
In 2014, Arjuna began collaborating with the Dravida Munnetra Kazhagam (DMK) on election strategies. He is credited with introducing poll strategist Prashant Kishor and his organisation I-PAC to the DMK, a partnership that contributed significantly to the party's victory in the 2021 Tamil Nadu Legislative Assembly election. In 2019, he founded One Mind India, a political data analysis and campaign development organisation, which later evolved into Voice of Commons (VOC), a political research and advocacy platform.

=== Viduthalai Chiruthaigal Katchi (VCK) ===
In 2023, Arjuna formally joined the Viduthalai Chiruthaigal Katchi (VCK), where his consultancy VOC restructured the party's grassroots framework and introduced digital campaign methods. He was elevated to Deputy General Secretary of the VCK in recognition of his contributions.

On 9 December 2024, he was suspended from the VCK for six months after sharing a stage with TVK president Vijay at a book launch on B. R. Ambedkar and calling for an end to dynastic politics — remarks widely interpreted as criticism of the ruling DMK. He resigned from the VCK on 15 December 2024.

=== Tamilaga Vettri Kazhagam (TVK) ===
On 31 January 2025, Arjuna officially joined the Tamilaga Vettri Kazhagam (TVK) at the party headquarters in Chennai, in the presence of party president Vijay. He was appointed General Secretary for Election Campaign Management, the highest post in the party after the president. In this role, he oversaw TVK's campaign strategy, booth-agent training programmes, and coordinated with political consultant John Arokiasamy of JPAC Persona for the 2026 elections.

==== Karur stampede and FIR ====
Following the Karur stampede on 27 September 2025 — which occurred during a TVK public rally led by Vijay and resulted in 41 deaths — Arjuna posted on X urging Tamil Nadu's youth to "revolt" against authority, drawing comparisons to political upheavals in Nepal and Sri Lanka. Tamil Nadu Police registered an FIR against him under multiple sections of the Bharatiya Nyaya Sanhita. The Madras High Court subsequently quashed the FIR, holding that the post constituted protected political dissent.

=== 2026 Tamil Nadu Legislative Assembly election ===
In the 2026 Tamil Nadu Legislative Assembly election, Arjuna contested from the Villivakkam assembly constituency in Chennai, a constituency adjoining Perambur, where TVK president Vijay also contested. He won the seat, polling 66,445 votes and defeating the nearest rival Karthik Mohan of the Dravida Munnetra Kazhagam by a margin of 17,302 votes.

2026 Tamil Nadu Legislative Assembly election: Villivakkam
Party	Candidate	Votes	%	±%
TVK	Aadhav Arjuna	66,445	46.97	New
DMK	Karthik Mohan	49,143	34.74	−18.63
AIADMK	S. R. Vijayakumar	19,338	13.67	−13.59
NTK	Roshini	4,310	3.05	−4.6
NOTA	NOTA	695	0.49	−0.52
Margin of victory		17,302	12.23	−13.87
Turnout		141,452	86.58	+30.70
Rejected ballots				
Registered electors		163,372		
TVK gain from DMK		Swing		

== Personal life ==
Arjuna is married to Daisy Martin, daughter of lottery businessman Santiago Martin, widely known as the "Lottery King" of Tamil Nadu. His mother-in-law and wife of Santiago Martin, Leema Rose Martin and brother-in-law Jose Charles Martin are MLAs from Lalgudi in Tamil Nadu and Kamraj Nagar in Puducherry respectively. Martin's company, Future Gaming and Hotel Services Pvt. Ltd, purchased ₹1,368 crore worth of electoral bonds between 2018 and 2024, the highest in the country.

== Electoral history ==
Assembly Election	Constituency	Party	Result	Votes	Margin
2026 Tamil Nadu Legislative Assembly election	Villivakkam	TVK	Won	66,445	15,302

== See also ==
- 2026 Tamil Nadu Legislative Assembly election
- Tamilaga Vettri Kazhagam
- Villivakkam (state assembly constituency)
- Martin Group (company)
- Basketball Federation of India
