= R. V. Janakiraman =

Indian politician

R.V. Janakiraman
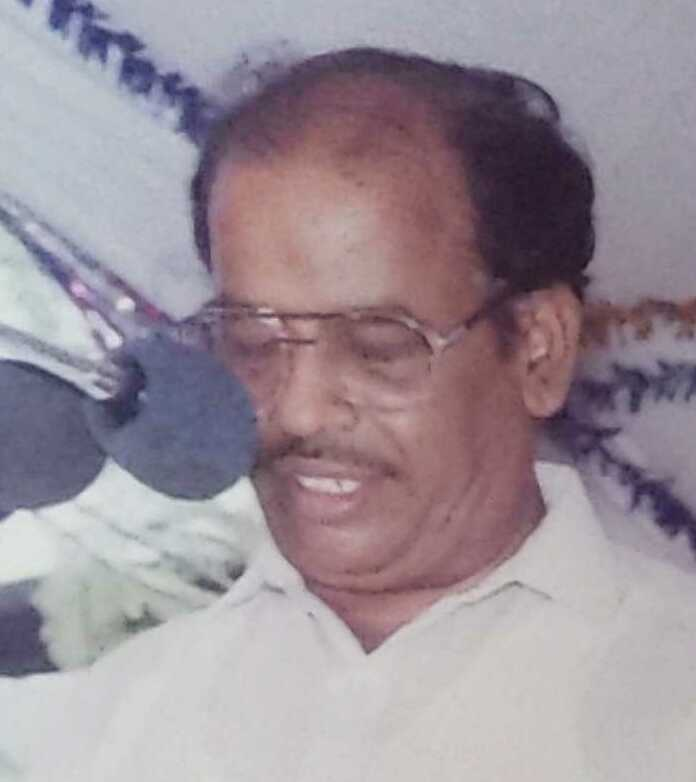

7th Chief Minister of Pondicherry
- In office 26 May 1996 – 18 March 2000
- Preceded by: V. Vaithilingam
- Succeeded by: P. Shanmugam

Leader of Opposition
- In office 22 March 2000 – 11 May 2006
- Constituency: Nellithope

Public Works Department Minister
- In office 1989–1991
- Constituency: Nellithope

Personal details
- Born: 8 January 1941 Villianur, Pondicherry, French India
- Died: 10 June 2019 (aged 78) Pondicherry, India
- Party: Dravida Munnetra Kazhagam

R. V. Janakiraman (8 January 1941 – 10 June 2019) was the Chief Minister of the Union Territory of Pondicherry.

== Political career ==
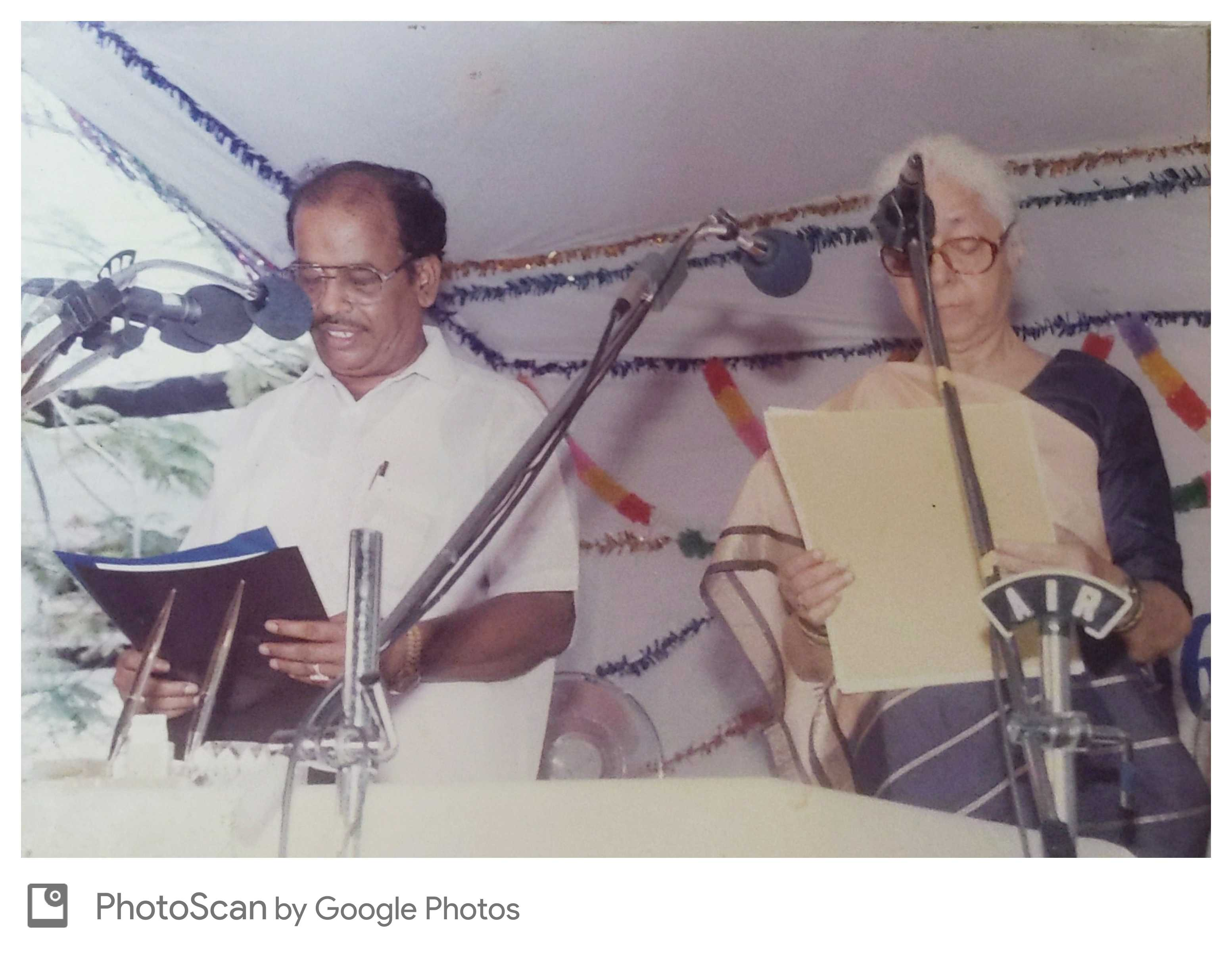
Janakiraman sworn in as Pondicherry Chief Minister in 1996 in the presence of Lt. Governor Rajendra Kumari Bajpai

He was elected from Nellithope assembly constituency for five consecutive terms starting from 1985, 1990, 1991, 1996, and 2001. He lost the polls to All India Anna Dravida Munnetra Kazhagam candidate Om Sakthi Sekar in 2006 owing to his health ailments (Parkinson's).

He served as Chief Minister of the Union Territory of Pondicherry from 26 May 1996 to 18 March 2000 and headed the coalition government of Dravida Munnetra Kazhagam and the Tamil Maanila Congress.

== Death ==
Janakiraman died aged 78 in a private hospital at Puducherry.

== Electoral history ==
Year	Post	Constituency	Party	Result
1985	M.L.A.	Nellithope	DMK	WON
1990	M.L.A.	Nellithope	DMK	WON
1991	M.L.A.	Nellithope	DMK	WON
1996	M.L.A.	Nellithope	DMK	WON
2001	M.L.A.	Nellithope	DMK	WON
2006	M.L.A.	Nellithope	DMK	LOSS
2011	M.L.A.	Nellithope	DMK	LOSS
