= V. Vigneswaran =

Indian politician

Member of the Puducherry Legislative Assembly
- Incumbent
- Assumed office 4 may 2026
- Preceded by: Chandira Priyanga
- Constituency: Nedungadu (SC)

Personal details
- Party: Independent
- Profession: Politician

V. Vigneswaran is an Indian politician from Puducherry. He is a member of the Puducherry Legislative Assembly from Nedungadu (SC) as an independent politician.

== Political career ==
Vigneswaran won the Nedungadu (SC) seat in the 2026 Puducherry Legislative Assembly election as an independent candidate. He received 14,368 votes and defeated Chandira Priyanga of the All India N.R. Congress by a margin of 4,499 votes.
