= Narayanasamy ministry =

2016–2021 union territory government in Puducherry, India

- 19th Ministry of the Union Territory of Puducherry
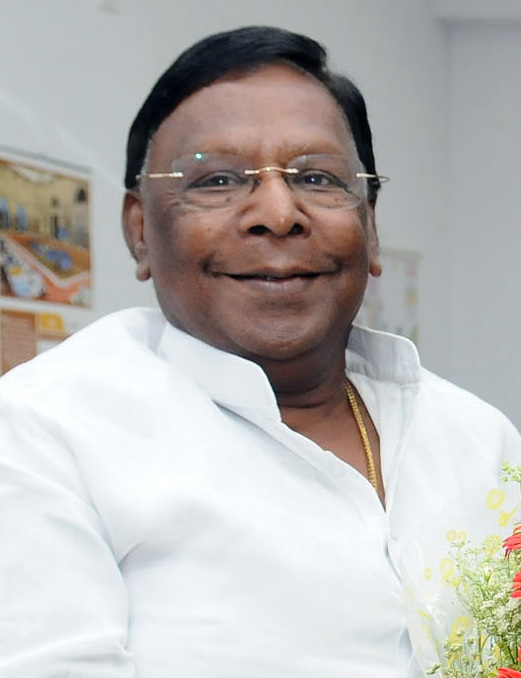
- V. Narayanasamy; Hon'ble Chief Minister of Puducherry
- Date formed: 6 June 2016
- Date dissolved: 22 February 2021

People and organisations
- Head of state: Lt Governor Kiran Bedi; Tamilisai Soundararajan
- Head of government: V. Narayanasamy
- No. of ministers: 6
- Member parties: Indian National Congress; Dravida Munnetra Kazhagam
- Status in legislature: Majority(Alliance Government)
- Opposition party: All India N.R. Congress
- Opposition leader: N. Rangaswamy

History
- Election: 2016
- Outgoing election: 2021
- Legislature terms: 4 years, 261 days
- Predecessor: Third Rangaswamy ministry
- Successor: Fourth Rangaswamy ministry

V. Narayanasamy was sworn in as Chief Minister of Puducherry on 6 June 2016. Here is the list of ministers:

== Cabinet ministers ==
Ministers sworn on 6 June 2016:

Colour key for parties
Indian National Congress

№.	Name Portfolio (Constituency)	Departments & Works Allotted (Ministries)		Party
1	V. Narayanasamy; Chief Minister (Nellithope)	Planning and Finance; General Administration; Home	Hindu Religious Institutions; Irrigation and Flood Control; Law	INC
2	Vacant (Note: A. Namassivayam held this portfolio until his resignation from ministry and Congress party during January 2021.); Cabinet Minister	Public Works including Public Health Division; Local Administration; Excise; Town & Country Planning	Animal Husbandry; Economics & Statistics; Stationery & Printing	
3	Malladi Krishna Rao; Cabinet Minister (Yanam)	Health & Family Welfare; Tourism & Civil Aviation; Fisheries; Housing	Sports & Youth Affairs; Art & Culture; Science & Technology	INC
4	M. Kandasamy; Cabinet Minister (Bahour)	Social Welfare; Women and Child Development; Adi-Dravidar Welfare; Backward Classes Welfare; Co-operation	Civil Supplies & Consumer Affairs; Labour and Employment; Pollution Control; Science, Technology and Environment; Port	INC
5	M. O. H. F. Shahjahan; Cabinet Minister (Kalapet)	Revenue; Industries & Commerce; Transport; Information Technology	Forest; Wakf Board; Minority Affairs	INC
6	R. Kamalakannan; Cabinet Minister (Thirunallar)	Electricity; Education including Collegiate Education; Agriculture; DRDA	Community Development; Fire Services; Sainik Welfare	INC

== Previous Cabinet Ministers ==
Sr. No.	Name	Constituency	Portfolio	Party	Term of office		
Sr. No.	Name	Constituency	Portfolio	Party	Took office	Left office	Duration
Cabinet Ministers
1.	A. Namassivayam	Villianur	Public Works including Public Health Division; Local Administration; Excise; Town & Country Planning; Animal Husbandry; Economics & Statistics; Stationery & Printing	INC	7 June 2016	25 January 2021	4 years, 232 days
