= V. Cartigueyane =

Indian politician

Member of the Puducherry Legislative Assembly
- Incumbent
- Assumed office 2026
- Preceded by: Richards Johnkumar
- Constituency: Nellithope

Personal details
- Party: Dravida Munnetra Kazhagam
- Profession: Politician

V. Cartigueyane is an Indian politician from Puducherry. He is a member of the Puducherry Legislative Assembly from Nellithope representing the Dravida Munnetra Kazhagam.

== Political career ==
Cartigueyane won the Nellithope seat in the 2026 Puducherry Legislative Assembly election as a candidate of the Dravida Munnetra Kazhagam. He received 8,226 votes and defeated Omsakthisekar, an independent candidate, by a margin of 850 votes.
