= Mohan Kumaramangalam =

Indian politician

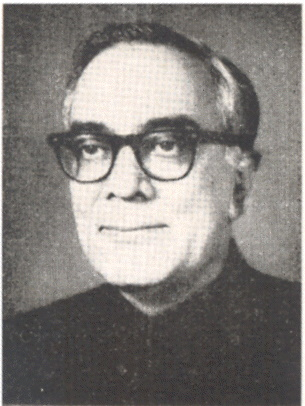

Union Minister of Steel and Mines
- In office 2 May 1971 – 31 May 1973
- Prime Minister: Indira Gandhi
- Preceded by: Self
- Succeeded by: Indira Gandhi

Union Minister of Steel and Heavy Engineering
- In office 18 March 1971 – 2 May 1971
- Prime Minister: Indira Gandhi
- Preceded by: Bali Ram Bhagat
- Succeeded by: Self

Member of Parliament, Lok Sabha
- In office 1971–1973
- Preceded by: Thirumudi.N.Sethuraman
- Succeeded by: Aravinda Bala Pajanor
- Constituency: Pondicherry

Advocate-General of Madras State
- In office 1966–1967
- Preceded by: N. Krishnaswami Reddy
- Succeeded by: Govind Swaminadhan

Personal details
- Born: 1 November 1916 London, United Kingdom
- Died: 31 May 1973 (aged 56) New Delhi, India
- Party: Communist Party of India (1938–1967); Indian National Congress (1967–1973)
- Spouse: Kalyani Mukerjee (m. 1943)
- Relations: General P. P. Kumaramangalam, Parvathi Krishnan
- Children: 3, including Rangarajan Kumaramangalam, Lalitha Kumaramangalam
- Profession: Lawyer

Surendra Mohan Kumaramangalam (1 November 1916 — 31 May 1973) was an Indian politician and communist theorist who was a member of the Communist Party of India, and later, the Indian National Congress. He also served as Advocate-General for Madras State from 1966 to 1967. Kumaramangalam was killed in the crash of Indian Airlines Flight 440 on 31 May 1973, at the age of 56.

== Early life and education ==
Mohan Kumaramangalam was born in London to P. Subbarayan, then zamindar of Kumaramangalam in Thiruchengode Taluk, Namakkal district and later, Chief Minister of Madras Presidency and his wife, Radhabai Subbarayan on 1 November 1916. He was their third and youngest son, Paramasiva Prabhakar Kumaramangalam and Gopal Kumaramangalam being elder to him. Mohan Kumaramangalam was educated at Eton and King's College, Cambridge, serving as President of the Cambridge Union Society in 1938. During his period at Cambridge he was deeply influenced by Communism.

Kumaramangalam was called to the bar by the Inner Temple. He returned to India in 1939 and participated in the Indian Independence Movement.

== Career ==
=== In the Indian Independence movement ===
In 1941, Kumaramangalam was arrested along with P. Ramamurthi, C. S. Subramaniam and R. Umanath for distributing seditious pamphlets in what came to be known as the Madras Conspiracy Case. Kumaramangalam was later released. During the Second World War Kumaramangalam served as the editor of the communist magazine, People's War, which on the conclusion of hostilities he renamed as People's Age.

=== Post-independence politics ===
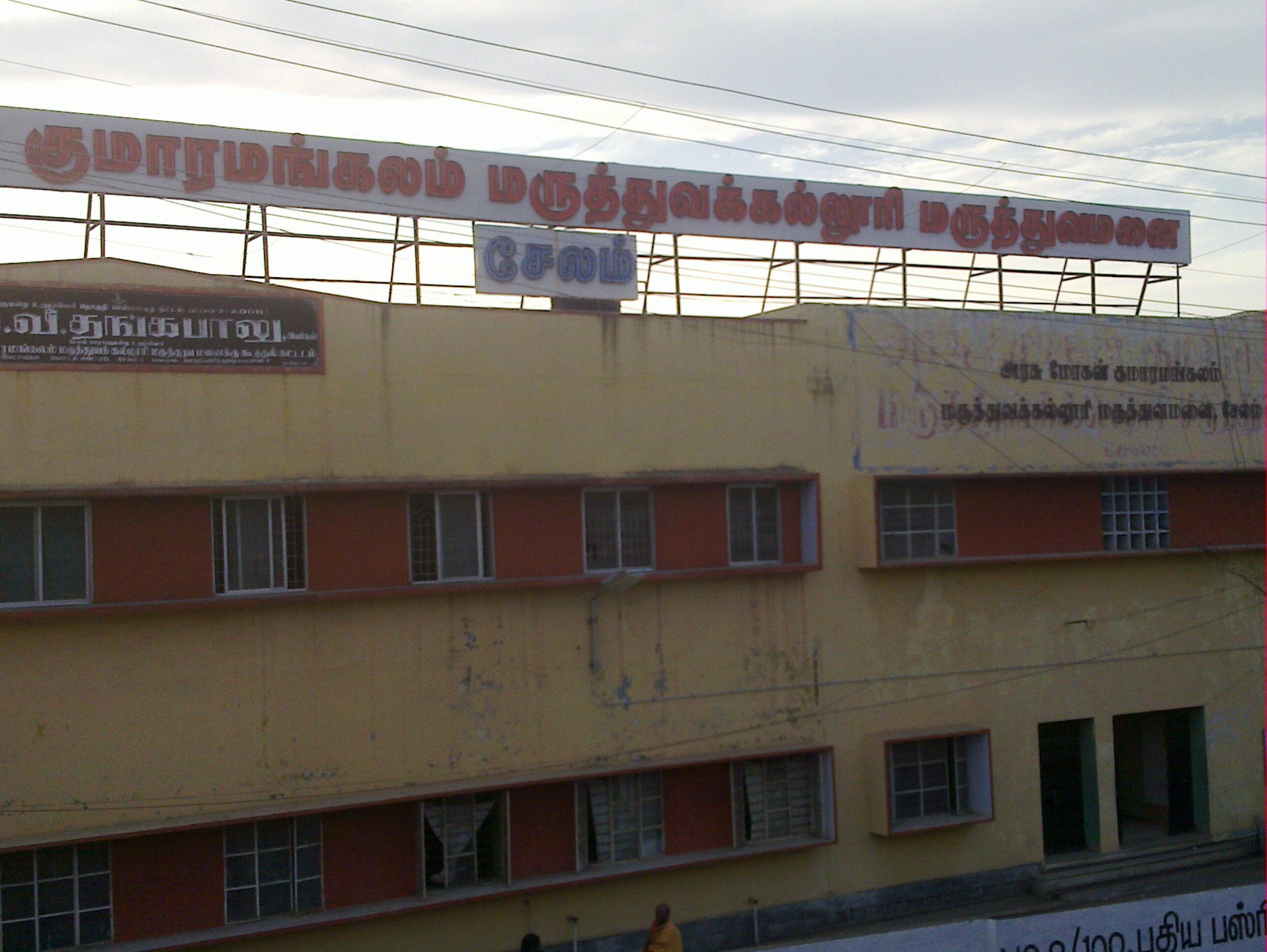
The government medical college hospital in Salem, has been named after Mohan Kumaramangalam

In the days following India's independence Madras Presidency was gripped by a peasant rebellion, which compelled the provincial government to launch a crackdown on communists. Kumaramangalam was arrested along with other communist leaders and released after the rebellion had subsided. Kumaramangalam favoured friendly relations with the Soviet Union and established the Indo-Soviet Cultural Society. However, with the onset of the 1960s Kumaramangalam began distancing himself from communism. He served as Advocate General of Madras. Following the victory of the Dravida Munnetra Kazhagam in the 1967 Tamil Nadu Assembly elections, Kumaramangalam resigned from the Communist Party of India and joined the Indian National Congress.

Kumaramangalam was loyal to Indira Gandhi when the party split and was elected to the Lok Sabha from Pondicherry in the 1971 elections. He was the driving force behind Indira Gandhi's decision in 1973, to appoint Ajit Nath Ray as the Chief Justice of India superseding three senior judges of the Supreme Court of India - J. M. Shelat, A.N Grover and K. S. Hegde.

He served as the Minister of Steel and Mines from 1971 until his death in 1973. One of his first acts in that position was to nationalise the mining industry.

== Personal life ==
Mohan Kumaramangalam married Kalyani Mukerjee, niece of Bengali politician Ajoy Mukherjee in 1943. Ajoy Mukherjee, later, served as the Chief Minister of West Bengal. The couple had a son, Rangarajan Kumaramangalam and two daughters. Rangarajan Kumaramangalam was a member of the Indian National Congress and later, the Bharatiya Janata Party and served as a minister in the Narasimha Rao and Atal Behari Vajpayee governments. Mohan's daughter, Lalitha Kumaramangalam contested the 2004 and 2009 Lok Sabha elections as a Bharatiya Janata Party candidate from Tiruchirapalli and lost on both occasions.

Mohan Kumaramangalam's brother P. P. Kumaramangalam was an army officer who served as India's Chief of Army Staff. His sister, Parvathi Krishnan was a politician of the Communist Party of India and served three terms as Member of Parliament from Coimbatore.

Kumaramangalam's grandson, Muktesh Mukherjee, and his wife Xiaomao Bai, were among the two Canadian passengers aboard Malaysia Airlines Flight 370 which went missing in 8 March 2014. Muktesh's father was the JSW Steel director, Malay Mukherjee. Malay's brother, Manoj Kumar Mukherjee was a supreme court judge and another brother, Milon Mukherjee is a Senior Advocate at the Calcutta High Court.

== Death ==
Kumaramangalam was killed in the crash of Indian Airlines Flight 440 on 31 May 1973, at the age of 56. Many of the dead were unidentifiable, but his body was identified by a Parker pen and a hearing aid he wore.

== Works ==
Mohan Kumaramangalam was a prominent communist theorist and authored a number of books and pamphlets. Some of his works include:

- Mohan Kumaramangalam (1944). A New Germany in birth. People's Publishing House.
- Mohan Kumaramangalam; Boda Chen (1944). Critique of CHina's destiny: Review of Marshal Chiang Kai Shek's book. People's Publishing House.
- Mohan Kumaramangalam; Enlai Zhou, Vladimir Rogov, Zhongguo gong chan dang (1944). Who threatens China's unity. People's Publishing House.
- Mohan Kumaramangalam (1945). The United Nations: Instrument for peace or dictatorship of the big five. People's Publishing House.
- Mohan Kumaramangalam (1946). Iran at the Crossroads. People's Publishing House.
- Mohan Kumaramangalam (1946). India's fight for equality in South Africe. People's Publishing House.
- Mohan Kumaramangalam (1947). India and the UNO. People's Publishing House.
- Mohan Kumaramangalam (1965). India's language crisis: an introductory study. New Century Book House.
- Mohan Kumaramangalam (1966). Democracy and cult of the individual. National Book Club.
- Mohan Kumaramangalam (1971). Constitutional amendments: the reason why. All India Congress Committee.
- Mohan Kumaramangalam (1973). Coal industry in India: nationalisation and tasks ahead. Oxford & IBH Pub. Co.
- Mohan Kumaramangalam (1973). Communists in Congress:Kumaramangalam's thesis. D. K. Pub. House. at Google Books
- Mohan Kumaramangalam (1973). Judicial appointments: an analysis of the recent controversy over the appointment of the Chief Justice of India. Oxford & IBH Pub. Co.
