= PPCC =

PPCC may refer to:

- "PPCC", the major debut single of the Japanese idol group BiS
- Chinese People's Political Consultative Conference
- Pikes Peak Community College, which changed its name to Pikes Peak State College
- Països Catalans (i.e. Catalan Countries)
- Puducherry Pradesh Congress Committee, branch of the Indian National Congress in Puducherry
- Punjab Pradesh Congress Committee, branch of the Indian National Congress in Punjab
