= Nellithope Assembly constituency =

Constituency of the Puducherry legislative assembly in India

Coordinates: 10.802°N 79.233°E

Nellitope
- Constituency No. 17 for the Puducherry Legislative Assembly
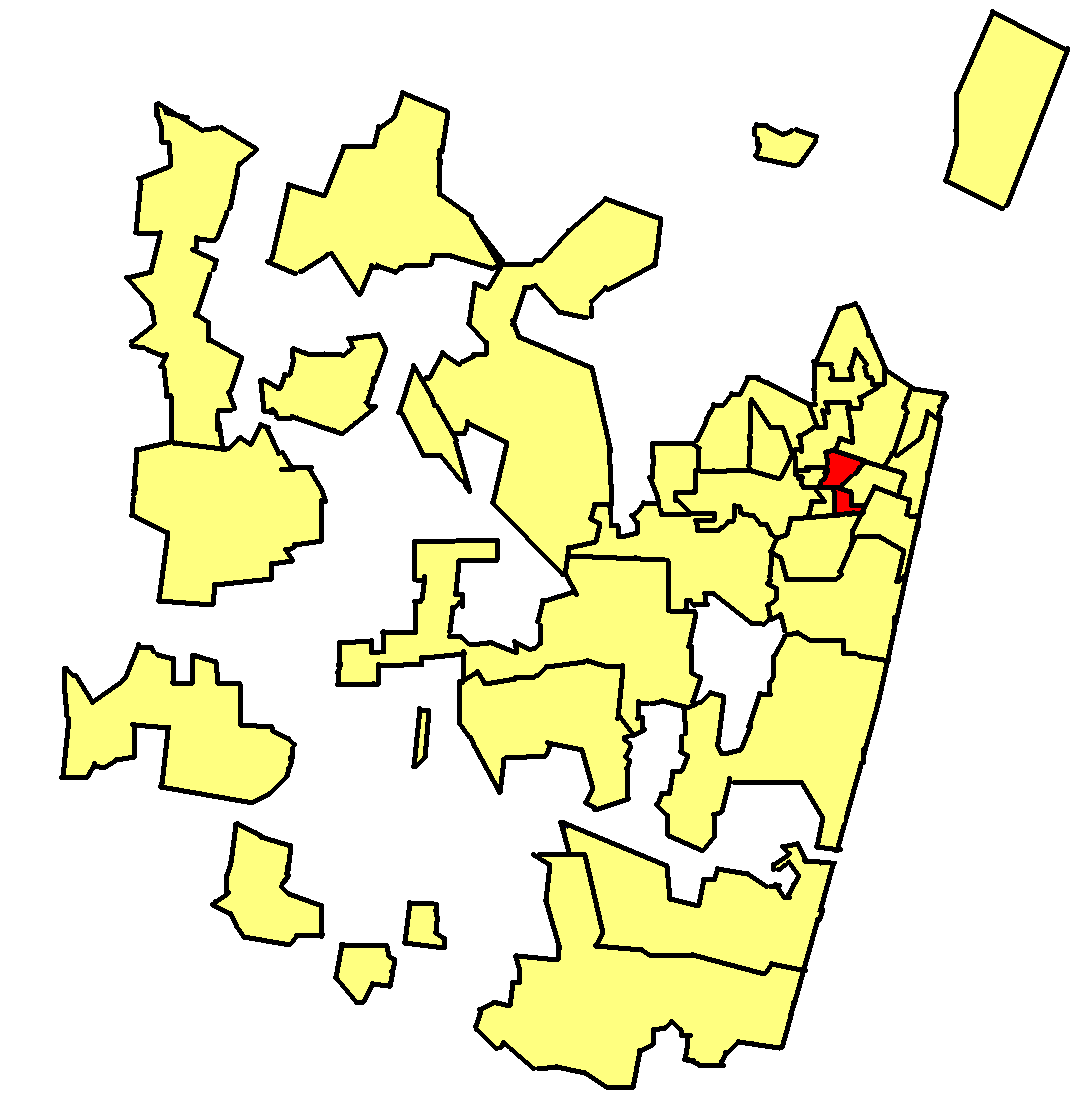

Constituency details
- Country: India
- Region: South India
- Union Territory: Puducherry
- District: Puducherry
- Lok Sabha constituency: Puducherry
- Established: 1964
- Total electors: 33,609
- Reservation: None

Member of Legislative Assembly
- 16th Puducherry Legislative Assembly
- Incumbent V. Cartigueyane
- Party: Dravida Munnetra Kazhagam
- Elected year: 2026

Nellithope is a legislative assembly constituency in the Union territory of Puducherry in India. Nellithope Assembly constituency is a part of Puducherry Lok Sabha constituency.

== Members of the Legislative Assembly ==
Year	Member	Political Party
1964	N. Ranganathan	People's Front
1969	N. Ranganathan	Communist Party of India
1974	R. Kannan	Indian National Congress
1977	R. Kannan	Janata Party
1980	P. Ramalingam	Dravida Munnetra Kazhagam
1985	R. V. Janakiraman	Dravida Munnetra Kazhagam
1990	R. V. Janakiraman	Dravida Munnetra Kazhagam
1991	R. V. Janakiraman	Dravida Munnetra Kazhagam
1996	R. V. Janakiraman	Dravida Munnetra Kazhagam
2001	R. V. Janakiraman	Dravida Munnetra Kazhagam
2006	Om Sakthi Sekhar	All India Anna Dravida Munnetra Kazhagam
2011	Om Sakthi Sekhar	All India Anna Dravida Munnetra Kazhagam
2016	A. Johnkumar	Indian National Congress
2016^	V. Narayanasamy	Indian National Congress
2021	Richards Johnkumar	Bharatiya Janata Party
2026	V. Cartigueyane	Dravida Munnetra Kazhagam

- by-election

== Election results ==
Vote share of winning candidates
2021	42.26%
2016	69.07%
2011	58.51%
2006	51.69%
2001	51.42%
1996	52.31%
1991	49.05%
1990	41.58%
1985	51.78%
1980	53.80%
1977	38.20%
1974	37.77%
1969	57.11%
1964	50.11%

=== Assembly Election 2026 ===
2026 Puducherry Legislative Assembly election: Nellithope
Party	Candidate	Votes	%	±%
DMK	V. Cartigueyane	8,226	33.21	▼
Independent	Om Sakthi Sekhar	7,376	29.78	
TVK	S. Vigneshwaran	4,763	19.23	New
LJK	A. Djeacoumar	3,311	13.37	
NOTA	None of the above	237	0.96	
Margin of victory		850	3.43	
Turnout		24,770		
Registered electors				
DMK gain from BJP		Swing		

=== Assembly Election 2021 ===
2021 Puducherry Legislative Assembly election: Nellithope
Party	Candidate	Votes	%	±%
BJP	Richards Johnkumar	11,757	42.26	41.19
DMK	V. Cartigueyane	11,261	40.47	
MNM	P. Murugesan	1,659	5.96	
NOTA	Nota	537	1.93	0.46
Independent	S. Prithivirajan	178	0.64	
My India Party	D. Arivumani	145	0.52	
Independent	Arun Murugan	142	0.51	
SDPI	R. Anfia Raj Kumar	139	0.50	
Independent	E. Irudhayaraj	124	0.45	
Margin of victory		496	1.78	−43.53
Turnout		27,823	82.56	−2.87
Registered electors		33,700		7.44
BJP gain from INC		Swing	-26.81	

=== Assembly Election 2016 ===
2016 Puducherry Legislative Assembly By-election: Nellithope
Party	Candidate	Votes	%	±%
INC	V Narayanasamy	18,506	69.07	
AIADMK	Omsakthi Sekar	6,365	23.75	−34.75
AINRC	D. Balaji	598	2.23	
NOTA	None of the Above	394	1.47	
BJP	Elangovan	287	1.07	−0.25
CPI	N. Mohan @ Veeraiyan	214	0.80	
Margin of victory		12,141	45.31	25.44
Turnout		26,795	85.43	0.62
Registered electors		31,366		17.01
INC gain from AIADMK		Swing	10.56	

=== Assembly Election 2011 ===
2011 Puducherry Legislative Assembly election: Nellithope
Party	Candidate	Votes	%	±%
AIADMK	Omsakthi Sekar	13,301	58.51	6.81
DMK	R. V. Janakiraman	8,783	38.63	−5.55
BJP	A. Velayutham	301	1.32	−0.33
Independent	M. Chitty Babu	112	0.49	
Margin of victory		4,518	19.87	12.36
Turnout		22,734	84.81	0.37
Registered electors		26,807		17.79
AIADMK hold		Swing	6.81	

=== Assembly Election 2006 ===
2006 Pondicherry Legislative Assembly election: Nellithope
Party	Candidate	Votes	%	±%
AIADMK	Omsakthi Sekar	9,933	51.69	13.10
DMK	R. V. Janakiraman	8,490	44.18	−7.24
BJP	V. Sanilkumar	317	1.65	
DMDK	M. Chittibabu	294	1.53	
Independent	M. Janakiraman	103	0.54	
Margin of victory		1,443	7.51	−5.32
Turnout		19,215	84.43	9.02
Registered electors		22,758		13.36
AIADMK gain from DMK		Swing	0.27	

=== Assembly Election 2001 ===
2001 Pondicherry Legislative Assembly election: Nellithope
Party	Candidate	Votes	%	±%
DMK	R. V. Janakiraman	7,780	51.42	−0.89
AIADMK	Dr. J. Nannan	5,839	38.59	−5.11
INC	E. Puviarasu	1,057	6.99	
MDMK	Vedha Venugopal	156	1.03	
Independent	G. Selvaraj	130	0.86	
Independent	K. Perumal	89	0.59	
Margin of victory		1,941	12.83	4.22
Turnout		15,130	75.41	16.33
Registered electors		20,076		−18.16
DMK hold		Swing	2.37	

=== Assembly Election 1996 ===
1996 Pondicherry Legislative Assembly election: Nellithope
Party	Candidate	Votes	%	±%
DMK	R. V. Janakiraman	8,803	52.31	3.26
AIADMK	D. Ramachandiren	7,354	43.70	−4.80
JD	K. Arunagiri	364	2.16	
BJP	S. Raja	204	1.21	−0.11
Margin of victory		1,449	8.61	8.06
Turnout		16,828	69.88	10.80
Registered electors		24,531		−1.28
DMK hold		Swing	3.26	

=== Assembly Election 1991 ===
1991 Pondicherry Legislative Assembly election: Nellithope
Party	Candidate	Votes	%	±%
DMK	R. V. Janakiraman	7,067	49.05	7.47
AIADMK	N. R. Shanmugam	6,988	48.50	10.26
BJP	G. Vengatesan	190	1.32	
Independent	P. Vijayakumar	65	0.45	
Margin of victory		79	0.55	−2.79
Turnout		14,407	59.08	−5.87
Registered electors		24,848		0.96
DMK hold		Swing	7.47	

=== Assembly Election 1990 ===
1990 Pondicherry Legislative Assembly election: Nellithope
Party	Candidate	Votes	%	±%
DMK	R. V. Janakiraman	6,601	41.58	−10.20
AIADMK	B. Manimaran	6,071	38.24	−3.83
Independent	P. Ramalingam	2,888	18.19	
PMK	P. Krishanan	173	1.09	
Independent	M. Loganathan	96	0.60	
Margin of victory		530	3.34	−6.37
Turnout		15,875	64.95	−6.37
Registered electors		24,612		62.91
DMK hold		Swing	-10.20	

=== Assembly Election 1985 ===
1985 Pondicherry Legislative Assembly election: Nellithope
Party	Candidate	Votes	%	±%
DMK	R. V. Janakiraman	5,526	51.78	−2.02
AIADMK	B. Manimaran	4,490	42.07	13.83
JP	R. Ramamurthy	518	4.85	
IC(S)	M. William	84	0.79	
BJP	A. Devaguru	54	0.51	
Margin of victory		1,036	9.71	−15.85
Turnout		10,672	71.31	−6.33
Registered electors		15,108		48.54
DMK hold		Swing	-2.02	

=== Assembly Election 1980 ===
1980 Pondicherry Legislative Assembly election: Nellithope
Party	Candidate	Votes	%	±%
DMK	P. Ramalingam	4,019	53.80	41.33
AIADMK	B. Manimaran	2,110	28.25	−1.36
CPI	N. Ranganathan	1,010	13.52	−6.20
Independent	C. Mounissamy	177	2.37	
INC(U)	N. Rajagopalan	138	1.85	
Margin of victory		1,909	25.56	16.96
Turnout		7,470	77.64	11.26
Registered electors		10,171		−7.18
DMK gain from JP		Swing	15.60	

=== Assembly Election 1977 ===
1977 Pondicherry Legislative Assembly election: Nellithope
Party	Candidate	Votes	%	±%
JP	R. Kannan	2,757	38.20	
AIADMK	P. Vengatesan	2,137	29.61	
CPI	Saraswati Subbiah	1,423	19.72	−16.14
DMK	D. Ariraman	900	12.47	−13.90
Margin of victory		620	8.59	6.68
Turnout		7,217	66.38	−14.46
Registered electors		10,958		29.77
JP gain from INC(O)		Swing	0.43	

=== Assembly Election 1974 ===
1974 Pondicherry Legislative Assembly election: Nellithope
Party	Candidate	Votes	%	±%
INC(O)	R. Kannan	2,495	37.77	
CPI	N. Ranganathan	2,369	35.86	−21.25
DMK	E. Puviarasu	1,742	26.37	
Margin of victory		126	1.91	−19.16
Turnout		6,606	80.84	8.20
Registered electors		8,444		−20.94
INC(O) gain from CPI		Swing	-19.34	

=== Assembly Election 1969 ===
1969 Pondicherry Legislative Assembly election: Nellithope
Party	Candidate	Votes	%	±%
CPI	N. Ranganathan	4,372	57.11	
INC	B. Chandrasekaran	2,759	36.04	−13.85
Independent	J. Panadurangan	524	6.85	
Margin of victory		1,613	21.07	20.85
Turnout		7,655	72.63	0.08
Registered electors		10,681		4.83
CPI gain from IPF		Swing	7.00	

=== Assembly Election 1964 ===
1964 Pondicherry Legislative Assembly election: Nellithope
Party	Candidate	Votes	%	±%
IPF	N. Ranganathan	3,627	50.11	
INC	R. T. Purushothaman	3,611	49.89	
Margin of victory		16	0.22	
Turnout		7,238	72.56	
Registered electors		10,189		
IPF win (new seat)				

== See also ==
- List of constituencies of the Puducherry Legislative Assembly
- Puducherry district
