= Aravinda Bala Pajanor =

Indian politician (1935-2013)

Minister of Petroleum, Chemicals and Fertilizers of the Republic of India
- In office 19 August 1979 – 23 December 1979
- Prime Minister: Charan Singh
- Preceded by: T. A. Pai
- Succeeded by: Shyam Nath Kacker
- Constituency: Puducherry

Member of Parliament, Lok Sabha
- In office 25 March 1977 – 22 August 1979
- Prime Minister: Morarji Desai; Charan Singh
- Preceded by: S. Mohan Kumaramangalam
- Succeeded by: P. Shanmugam
- Constituency: Puducherry

Personal details
- Born: 5 December 1935 Pondicherry, India
- Died: 20 March 2013 (aged 77) United States
- Party: All India Anna Dravida Munnetra Kazhagam
- Education: Dr. Ambedkar Government Law College, Chennai

Aravinda Bala Pajanor (5 December 1935 – 20 March 2013) was an Indian lawyer and politician who served as the minister of petroleum, chemicals, and fertilizers of the Republic of India in the Charan Singh-led government of India. He was the first member of parliament in the Lok Sabha of the All India Anna Dravida Munnetra Kazhagam from the Puducherry constituency. He and Sathiavani Muthu are the first politicians belonging to the Dravidian and regional party to join the union cabinet.

== Early life and background ==
He was born to Appasamy Pajanor on 5 December 1935 at Karaikal town in Pondicherry, India. He received his education from St. Mary's Matriculation High School, Karaikal; St. Joseph's College, Tiruchirappalli; and Loyola College, Chennai. He later attended Dr. Ambedkar Government Law College, Chennai, where he obtained his B.L. degree. He also served as a chairperson of the Sports Council, Pondicherry, and president of the students' union, in addition to serving as a lawyer at the Madras High Court.

He was married to Freeda Gajalakshmi Pajanor, with whom he had two children. After retiring from politics, he moved to the United States, where he spent most of his time after retirement. He died in the U.S. on 20 March 2013 due to ageing.
