= P. Shanmugam (Pondicherry politician) =

Indian politician

Chief Minister of Pondicherry
- In office 22 March 2000 – 27 October 2001
- Lieutenant Governor: Rajani Rai
- Preceded by: R. V. Janakiraman
- Succeeded by: N. Rangaswamy

Member of Parliament (Lok Sabha) for Pondicherry
- In office 1980–1991
- Prime Minister: Indira Gandhi, Rajiv Gandhi
- Preceded by: Aravinda Bala Pajanor
- Succeeded by: M. O. H. Farook

Personal details
- Born: 25 March 1927
- Died: 2 February 2013 (aged 85) Karaikal
- Party: Indian National Congress
- Profession: Politician

P. Shanmugam (25 March 1927 – 2 February 2013) (Born to Panchanatha Mudaliyar - Gowri) was the Chief Minister of the Union Territory of Pondicherry. He served from 22 March 2000 to 27 October 2001.

A staunch loyalist of the Nehru-Gandhi family, he was in politics since 1950. He was the Leader of the Opposition between 1969 and 1973 when the DMK formed the government. He represented Puducherry in the Lok Sabha for three consecutive terms from 1980 and was elected to Puducherry Assembly thrice. He held the post of Puducherry Pradesh Congress Committee for about 33 years. He played key role in the formation of many governments in the Union Territory.

== Notes ==
Preceded by Aravinda Bala Pajanor	Member of Indian Parliament (Lok Sabha) for Pondicherry; 1980 - 1991	Succeeded by M. O. H. Farook
Preceded by R. V. Janakiraman	Chief Minister of Pondicherry; 22 March 2000 – 27 October 2001	Succeeded by N. Rangaswamy
