= Jose Charles Martin =

Indian politician in Puducherry

Member of the Puducherry Legislative Assembly
- Incumbent
- Assumed office 4 May 2026
- Preceded by: A. Johnkumar
- Constituency: Kamaraj Nagar

President of the Latchiya Jananayaka Katchi
- Incumbent
- Assumed office 14 December 2025
- Preceded by: Position established

Personal details
- Party: Latchiya Jananayaka Katchi
- Parents: Santiago Martin (father); Leema Rose Martin (mother)
- Relatives: Aadhav Arjuna (brother-in-law)
- Profession: Politician

Jose Charles Martin is an Indian politician from Puducherry. He is the Managing Director of the Martin Group. He serves as a member of the Puducherry Legislative Assembly from the Kamaraj Nagar Assembly constituency. He is the President of the Latchiya Jananayaka Katchi.

== Political career ==
Jose Charles Martin was elected to the Puducherry Legislative Assembly from the Kamaraj Nagar Assembly constituency in the 2026 Puducherry Legislative Assembly election. He succeeded A. Johnkumar as the constituency's representative.

== Business career ==
Apart from politics, Jose Charles Martin serves as the Managing Director of the Martin Group.

== Personal life ==
Jose Charles Martin is the son of businessman Santiago Martin and Leema Rose Martin. He is also related to politician Aadhav Arjuna, who is his brother-in-law.

== See also ==
- Martin Group
