= K. Lakshminarayanan =

Indian politician

PWD Minister, Government of Puducherry
- In office 7 May 2021 – 2026

Member of Legislative Assembly Puducherry
- In office 2011–2026
- Preceded by: S. P. Sivakumar
- Succeeded by: Vignesh Kannan
- Constituency: Raj Bhavan

Personal details
- Born: Pondichéry, French India (now Puducherry, India)
- Party: All India NR Congress From (2021)
- Other political affiliations: Indian National Congress Till (2021)

K. Lakshminarayanan is an Indian politician from All India NR Congress. He was elected from the Raj Bhavan in the Puducherry Legislative Assembly election in 2021 as a member of All India N.R. Congress.

He was suspended from the Congress party for his anti-party activities. Following that Namassivayam submitted his MLA resignation letter to the assembly speaker and quit the Congress party the day before Puducherry's trust vote in 2021.
