= Leema Rose Martin =

Indian politician (born 1968)

S . Leema Rose Martin

Member of the Tamil Nadu Legislative Assembly
- Incumbent
- Assumed office 11 May 2026
- Preceded by: A. Soundara Pandian
- Constituency: Lalgudi

Personal details
- Party: All India Anna Dravida Munnetra Kazhagam
- Spouse: Santiago Martin
- Children: Jose Charles Martin
- Relatives: Aadhav Arjuna (son-in-law)

Leema Rose Martin (born 1968) is an Indian politician from Tamil Nadu. She is a Member of the Legislative Assembly from Lalgudi constituency in Tiruchirappalli district representing the All India Anna Dravida Munnetra Kazhagam.

Martin is from Coimbatore, Tamil Nadu. She is the richest candidate in the assembly as per her affidavit filed with the Election Commission of India. She is the wife of lottery baron Santiago Martin and the mother-in-law of Aadhav Arjuna of the TVK. she had declared net assets worth Rs.1049.5 crores.

== Career ==
She became an MLA for the first time winning the 2026 Tamil Nadu Legislative Assembly election from Lalgudi Assembly constituency representing the All India Anna Dravida Munnetra Kazhagam. She polled 60,795 votes and defeated her nearest rival, Ku Pa Krishnan of the Tamilaga Vettri Kazhagam, by a margin of 2,739 votes.
