= Thirumudi N. Sethuraman =

Indian politician (1923–1979)

- திருமுடி.ந.சேதுராமன்
- With former president Dr. Sarvepalli Radhakrishnan, and former president Dr. Rajendra Prasad

Member of Parliament (Lok Sabha) for Pondicherry
- In office 1967–1971
- Prime Minister: Indira Gandhi
- Succeeded by: Mohan Kumaramangalam

Deputy Mayor of Puducherry
- In office 1965–1967

Member, Puducherry Legislative Assembly
- In office September 1955 – November 1958
- In office October 1963 – August 1964

Personal details
- Born: 24 January 1923 Pondicherry, French India
- Died: 23 December 1979 (aged 56)
- Party: Indian National Congress
- Spouse: Marie Therese
- Profession: Politician

Thirumudi Nataraja Sethuraman (Tamil: திருமுடி.ந.சேதுராமன்) (24 January 1923 – 23 December 1979) was an Indian politician who participated in the Indian independence movement. In 1946, he was involved in the freedom movement in Puducherry (then called Pondicherry) by forming the French India National Congress along with J. Savarinathan, Ambadi Narayanan, Govinda Pathar, and M. A. Annamalai. It was succeeded by French India Students Congress. He served as the Deputy Mayor of Pondicherry. In 1967, he was elected as the Member of Parliament from Puducherry (Lok Sabha constituency). He ran again in 1971 but lost to Mohan Kumaramangalam.

== Early life ==
Thirumudi N. Sethuraman was born on 24 January 1923 in Puducherry to Nataraja Chettiar and Kusalambal Ammaiyar. His parents believed he was born by the grace of the Lord at Rameswaram, following the loss of his elder brother at the age of 4. He was originally named 'Sethu Ramasamy,' inspired by the belief in the Sethu Dam built by Lord Ram in Rameswaram. He later became known as 'Sethuraman,' with 'Thirumudi' being his family name. He had a younger brother, Velmurugan, and a younger sister, Rasambal. Their family resided in a traditional Chettinad house on Ananda Rangapillai Street in Puducherry, a home where they felt the presence of Lord Lakshmi and Lord Saraswati.

His family was well-known in the city. They were wealthy and famous in Puducherry. His ancestor Arumuga Chettiar and his descendants lived in Tharangambadi and were trading with the Netherlands. They were into the trade of dye, tobacco, and soap among other products and expanded their trade expanded to Mauritius, where they had bungalows and two farmlands. Whilst in Mauritius, they constructed a temple for Lord Shiva in which is still intact to this day. Later, they gave their farmland for lease to 'Helios Malaka Company'. Meanwhile, they got into contact with the French East India Company and shifted to Puducherry where they continued their business. One of them was 'Padangu Narayanasamy Chettiar', a philanthropist who was appreciated by M. Z. Savarayalounayagar in Recueil de chants tamouls.

== Gallery ==
With Ex-President Dr.Rajendra Prasad

With Ex-President Dr.Sarvepalli Radhakrishnan
