= Richards Johnkumar =

Indian politician

Member of Puducherry Legislative Assembly
- Incumbent
- Assumed office 2 May 2021
- Preceded by: V. Narayanasamy
- Constituency: Nellithope

Personal details
- Party: Bharatiya Janata Party
- Parent: A. Johnkumar (father)
- Education: Bachelor of Architecture
- Alma mater: SRM University
- Profession: Businessman

Vivilian Richards Johnkumar is an Indian politician. He was elected to the Puducherry Legislative Assembly from Nellithope as a member of the Bharatiya Janata Party. He defeated V. Karthikeyan of Dravida Munnetra Kazhagam by 496 votes in 2021 Puducherry Assembly election.
