= Raj Bhavan Assembly constituency =

Constituency of the Puducherry legislative assembly in India

Coordinates: 11.934°N 79.834°E

Raj Bhavan
- Constituency No. 14 for the Puducherry Legislative Assembly
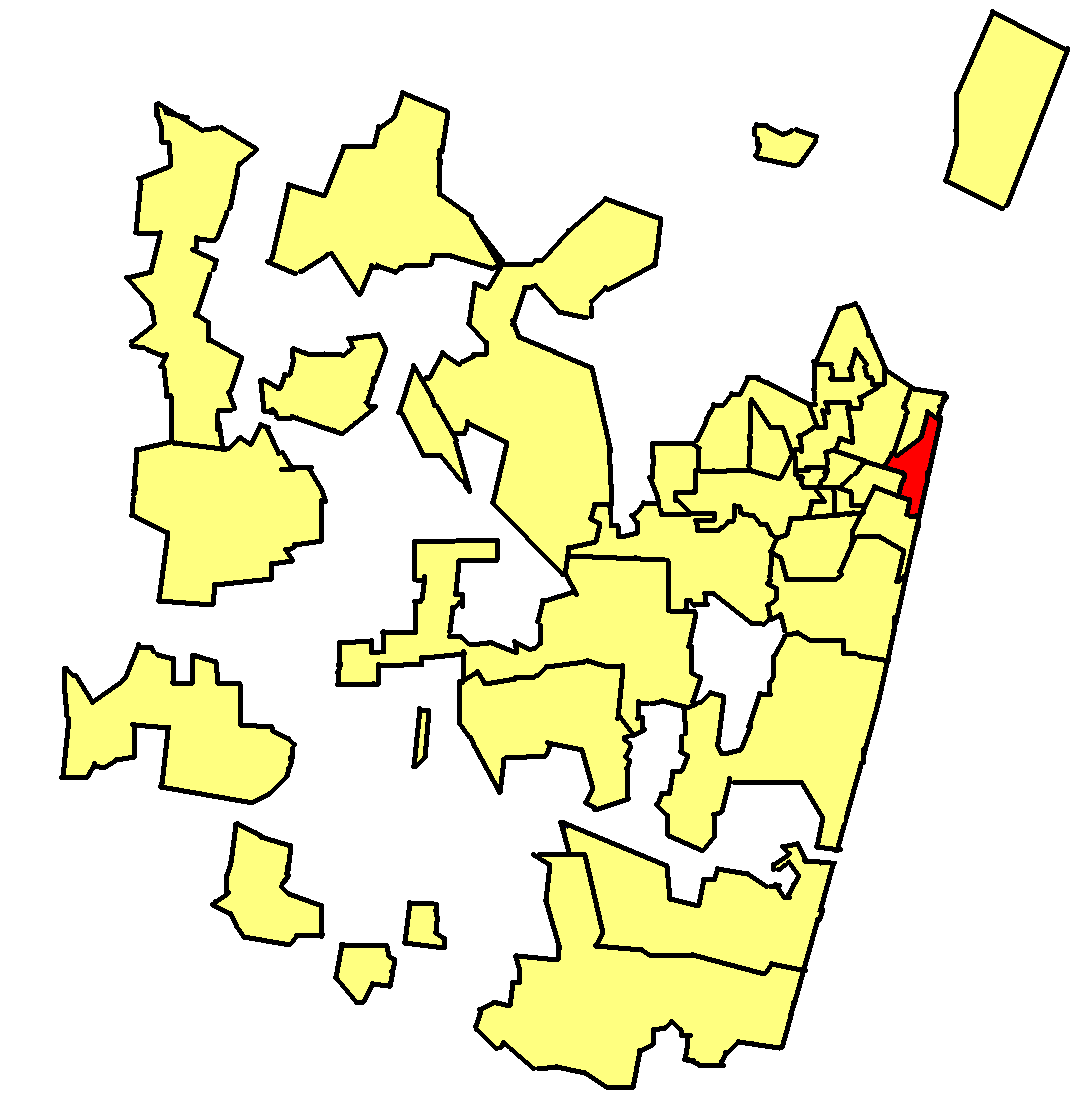

Constituency details
- Country: India
- Region: South India
- Union Territory: Puducherry
- District: Puducherry
- Lok Sabha constituency: Puducherry
- Established: 1964
- Total electors: 26,349
- Reservation: None

Member of Legislative Assembly
- 16th Puducherry Legislative Assembly
- Incumbent K. Lakshminarayanan
- Party: AINRC
- Alliance: NDA
- Elected year: 2021

Raj Bhavan is a legislative assembly constituency in the Union territory of Puducherry in India. Raj Bhavan Assembly constituency is a part of Puducherry Lok Sabha constituency.

== Members of the Legislative Assembly ==
Year	Member	Party
1964	Édouard Goubert	Indian National Congress
1969	D. Kantharaj	Indian National Congress
1974	Dhana Kantharaj	Indian National Congress
1977	D. Ramajayam	Janata Party
1980	L. Joseph Mariadass	Dravida Munnetra Kazhagam
1985	L. Joseph Mariadass	Indian National Congress
1990	S. P. Sivakumar	Dravida Munnetra Kazhagam
1991	A. Gandhiraj	Indian National Congress
1996	S. P. Sivakumar	Dravida Munnetra Kazhagam
2001	S. P. Sivakumar	Dravida Munnetra Kazhagam
2006	S. P. Sivakumar	Dravida Munnetra Kazhagam
2011	K. Lakshminarayanan	Indian National Congress
2016	K. Lakshminarayanan	Indian National Congress
2021	K. Lakshminarayanan	All India N.R. Congress
2026	Vignesh Kannan	Dravida Munnetra Kazhagam

== Election results ==
Vote share of winning candidates
2021	51.86%
2016	47.23%
2011	59.57%
2006	65.95%
2001	57.79%
1996	58.54%
1991	48.45%
1990	47.58%
1985	54.77%
1980	45.92%
1977	35.31%
1974	56.00%
1969	51.62%
1964	78.47%

=== 2026 ===
2026 Puducherry Legislative Assembly election: Raj Bhavan
Party	Candidate	Votes	%	±%
DMK	Vignesh Kannan	7,304	39.03	
BJP	V. P. Ramalingame	7,017	37.49	
TVK	V. J. Chandran	2,361	12.61	
INC	R. Kumaran	1,538	8.22	
NOTA	None of the above	209	1.12	
IND	Ramalingam	42	0.22	
TMTHK	P. Kodeswaran	32	0.17	
Majority		287	1.54	
Turnout		18,716	88.90	
DMK gain from AINRC		Swing		

=== Assembly Election 2021 ===
2021 Puducherry Legislative Assembly election: Raj Bhavan
Party	Candidate	Votes	%	±%
AINRC	K. Lakshminarayanan	10,096	51.86%	
DMK	S. P. Sivakumar	6,364	32.69%	
MNM	S. Paruvadhavardhnie	1,462	7.51%	
NOTA	Nota	303	1.56%	−0.88%
Independent	S. K. Subramanian	144	0.74%	
Margin of victory		3,732	19.17%	8.05%
Turnout		19,466	73.93%	−3.85%
Registered electors		26,329		2.40%
AINRC gain from INC		Swing	4.64%	

=== Assembly Election 2016 ===
2016 Puducherry Legislative Assembly election: Raj Bhavan
Party	Candidate	Votes	%	±%
INC	K. Lakshminarayanan	9,445	47.23%	−12.35%
AIADMK	P. Kannan	7,220	36.10%	13.48%
AINRC	A. Annibal Nehru	1,517	7.59%	
BJP	N. Pougajendy	929	4.65%	1.74%
NOTA	None of the Above	487	2.44%	
Margin of victory		2,225	11.13%	−25.83%
Turnout		20,000	77.78%	0.64%
Registered electors		25,713		3.67%
INC hold		Swing	-12.35%	

=== Assembly Election 2011 ===
2011 Puducherry Legislative Assembly election: Raj Bhavan
Party	Candidate	Votes	%	±%
INC	K. Lakshminarayanan	11,398	59.57%	
AIADMK	M. Saravanakumar	4,327	22.62%	
Independent	Annibal Nehru	2,536	13.25%	
BJP	S. P. Lallu	555	2.90%	−0.97%
Independent	I. M. Sekar Naicker	227	1.19%	
Independent	M. Arumai Selvam	90	0.47%	
Margin of victory		7,071	36.96%	−1.14%
Turnout		19,133	77.14%	0.43%
Registered electors		24,802		384.51%
INC gain from DMK		Swing	-6.38%	

=== Assembly Election 2006 ===
2006 Pondicherry Legislative Assembly election: Raj Bhavan
Party	Candidate	Votes	%	±%
DMK	S. P. Sivakumar	2,590	65.95%	8.17%
PMC	P. K. Devadoss	1,094	27.86%	
BJP	R. Govindarajane	152	3.87%	
DMDK	A. Xavier	49	1.25%	
Independent	V. Ramamoorthi	19	0.48%	
Margin of victory		1,496	38.10%	11.70%
Turnout		3,927	76.71%	10.96%
Registered electors		5,119		−19.32%
DMK hold		Swing	8.17%	

=== Assembly Election 2001 ===
2001 Pondicherry Legislative Assembly election: Raj Bhavan
Party	Candidate	Votes	%	±%
DMK	S. P. Sivakumar	2,408	57.79%	−0.75%
INC	A. Gandhiraj	1,308	31.39%	6.23%
AIADMK	M. Pandurangan	340	8.16%	
Independent	T. Ramalingam	66	1.58%	
MDMK	R. Balasubramanian	45	1.08%	
Margin of victory		1,100	26.40%	−6.99%
Turnout		4,167	65.75%	9.80%
Registered electors		6,345		−11.35%
DMK hold		Swing	9.33%	

=== Assembly Election 1996 ===
1996 Pondicherry Legislative Assembly election: Raj Bhavan
Party	Candidate	Votes	%	±%
DMK	S. P. Sivakumar	2,697	58.54%	11.09%
INC	A. Gandhirasu	1,159	25.16%	−23.30%
Independent	Louie Pragassa Kannaiya	559	12.13%	
BJP	M. Visweswaran	105	2.28%	−0.49%
Independent	G. Rajmohan Yadav	39	0.85%	
AIIC(T)	D. Ramajayam	28	0.61%	
Margin of victory		1,538	33.38%	32.39%
Turnout		4,607	65.39%	9.44%
Registered electors		7,157		−20.17%
DMK gain from INC		Swing	10.09%	

=== Assembly Election 1991 ===
1991 Pondicherry Legislative Assembly election: Raj Bhavan
Party	Candidate	Votes	%	±%
INC	A. Gandhiraj	2,381	48.45%	3.71%
DMK	S. P. Sivakumar	2,332	47.46%	−0.13%
BJP	S. Damodaran	136	2.77%	0.21%
Independent	R. Gotahndaraman	29	0.59%	
Margin of victory		49	1.00%	−1.84%
Turnout		4,914	55.95%	−6.12%
Registered electors		8,965		3.94%
INC gain from DMK		Swing	0.87%	

=== Assembly Election 1990 ===
1990 Pondicherry Legislative Assembly election: Raj Bhavan
Party	Candidate	Votes	%	±%
DMK	S. P. Sivakumar	2,528	47.58%	11.86%
INC	L. Joseph Mariadoss	2,377	44.74%	−10.03%
INS(SCS)	P. S. Sukumaran	178	3.35%	
BJP	S. Dhamodaran	136	2.56%	1.90%
Independent	K. Vijayalakshmi	47	0.88%	
Margin of victory		151	2.84%	−16.20%
Turnout		5,313	62.08%	−3.88%
Registered electors		8,625		27.51%
DMK gain from INC		Swing	-7.18%	

=== Assembly Election 1985 ===
1985 Pondicherry Legislative Assembly election: Raj Bhavan
Party	Candidate	Votes	%	±%
INC	L. Joseph Mariadoss	2,419	54.77%	
DMK	Louie Pragassa Kannaiya	1,578	35.73%	−10.20%
JP	V. Uthaman	230	5.21%	
IC(S)	L. Vengataraman	161	3.65%	
BJP	V. Govindasamy	29	0.66%	
Margin of victory		841	19.04%	−0.45%
Turnout		4,417	65.95%	0.49%
Registered electors		6,764		3.02%
INC gain from DMK		Swing	8.84%	

=== Assembly Election 1980 ===
1980 Pondicherry Legislative Assembly election: Raj Bhavan
Party	Candidate	Votes	%	±%
DMK	L. Joseph Mariadass	1,880	45.92%	37.96%
CPI	V. Subbiah	1,082	26.43%	
JP	M. K. Jeevarathina Odayar	510	12.46%	
Independent	M. V. Vaithilingam	479	11.70%	
Independent	N. Kaliaperumal	70	1.71%	
Independent	Marius Bala	37	0.90%	
JP(S)	Thiagi Thirukamu	36	0.88%	
Margin of victory		798	19.49%	19.14%
Turnout		4,094	65.46%	8.23%
Registered electors		6,566		−6.76%
DMK gain from JP		Swing	10.61%	

=== Assembly Election 1977 ===
1977 Pondicherry Legislative Assembly election: Raj Bhavan
Party	Candidate	Votes	%	±%
JP	D. Ramajayam	1,411	35.31%	
INC	Dana Kanthraj	1,397	34.96%	−21.04%
AIADMK	S. Sadagopan	870	21.77%	−4.00%
DMK	Durai Subramanian	318	7.96%	−10.27%
Margin of victory		14	0.35%	−29.88%
Turnout		3,996	57.23%	−16.93%
Registered electors		7,042		18.85%
JP gain from INC		Swing	-20.69%	

=== Assembly Election 1974 ===
1974 Pondicherry Legislative Assembly election: Raj Bhavan
Party	Candidate	Votes	%	±%
INC	Dhana Kantharaj	2,399	56.00%	4.38%
AIADMK	K. Jothi	1,104	25.77%	
DMK	M. L. Selvaradjou	781	18.23%	−30.15%
Margin of victory		1,295	30.23%	26.98%
Turnout		4,284	74.16%	6.35%
Registered electors		5,925		14.43%
INC hold		Swing	4.38%	

=== Assembly Election 1969 ===
1969 Pondicherry Legislative Assembly election: Raj Bhavan
Party	Candidate	Votes	%	±%
INC	D. Kantharaj	1,766	51.62%	−26.84%
DMK	S. Sadagopan	1,655	48.38%	
Margin of victory		111	3.24%	−56.14%
Turnout		3,421	67.81%	2.34%
Registered electors		5,178		−3.50%
INC hold		Swing	-26.84%	

=== Assembly Election 1964 ===
1964 Pondicherry Legislative Assembly election: Raj Bhavan
Party	Candidate	Votes	%	±%
INC	Édouard Goubert	2,722	78.47%	
Independent	S. Pakiam	662	19.08%	
IPF	Jimmy Ebenezar Robert	85	2.45%	
Margin of victory		2,060	59.38%	
Turnout		3,469	65.47%	
Registered electors		5,366		
INC win (new seat)				
