= Nedungadu Assembly constituency =

Constituency of the Puducherry legislative assembly in India

Coordinates: 10.968°N 79.773°E

Nedungadu
- Constituency No. 24 for the Puducherry Legislative Assembly
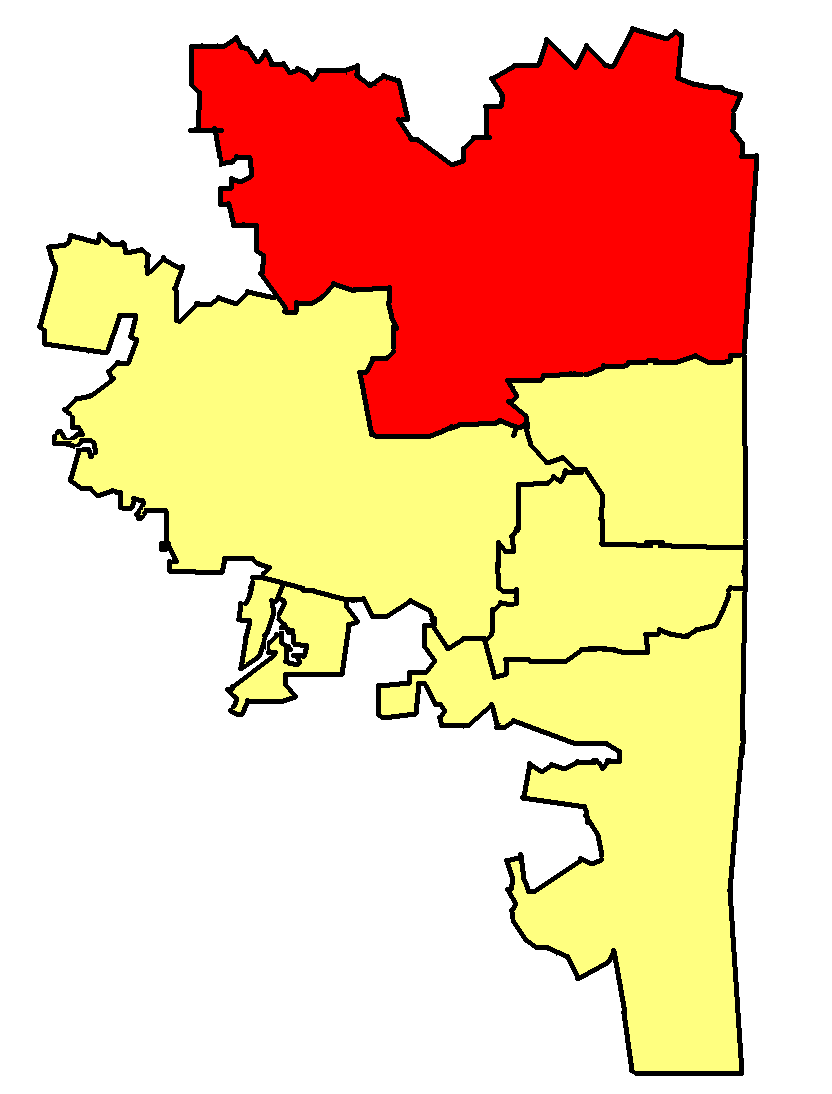

Constituency details
- Country: India
- Region: South India
- Union Territory: Puducherry
- District: Karaikal
- Lok Sabha constituency: Puducherry
- Established: 1964
- Total electors: 31,494
- Reservation: SC

Member of Legislative Assembly
- 16th Puducherry Legislative Assembly
- Incumbent Chandira Priyanga
- Party: AINRC
- Alliance: NDA
- Elected year: 2021

Nedungadu is a legislative assembly constituency in the Union territory of Puducherry in India. Nedungadu assembly constituency was part of Puducherry Lok Sabha constituency. This assembly constituency has been reserved for SC candidates from 1974.

== Members of Legislative Assembly ==
Sitting and previous MLAs from Nedungadu Assembly Constituency are:

Year	Name	Party
1974	R. Coupousamy	Indian National Congress
1977	P. Selvaraj	All India Anna Dravida Munnetra Kazhagam
1980	M. Chandirakasu	Indian National Congress
1985	M. Chandirakasu	Indian National Congress
1990	M. Chandirakasu	Indian National Congress
1991	M. Chandirakasu	Indian National Congress
1996	A. Marimuthu	Dravida Munnetra Kazhagam
2001	M. Chandirakasu	Indian National Congress
2006	A. Marimuthu	Independent politician
2011	M. Chandirakasu	All India N.R. Congress
2016	S. Chandra Priyanga	All India N.R. Congress
2021	S. Chandra Priyanga	All India N.R. Congress
2026	V. Vigneswaran	Independent politician

== Election results ==
Vote share of winning candidates
2026	50.54%
2021	40.20%
2016	34.47%
2011	55.05%
2006	43.47%
2001	45.35%
1996	54.93%
1991	55.25%
1990	55.68%
1985	67.60%
1980	65.23%
1977	39.15%
1974	41.18%
1969	50.16%
1964	65.60%

=== Assembly Election 2026 ===
2026 Puducherry Legislative Assembly election: Nedungadu
Party	Candidate	Votes	%	±%
Independent	V. Vigneswaran	14,368	50.54	
AINRC	Chandira Priyanga	9,869	34.70	
TVK	U. Kamaraj	1,865	6.56	New
INC	Dhinesh Kumar	1,354	4.76	
NOTA	NOTA	335	1.18	
Margin of victory		4,499	15.84	
Turnout		28,431	90.25	
Registered electors		31,506		
Independent gain from AINRC		Swing	10.34	

=== Assembly Election 2021 ===
2021 Puducherry Legislative Assembly election: Nedungadu
Party	Candidate	Votes	%	±%
AINRC	Chandira Priyanga	10,774	40.20	
INC	A. Marimuthu	8,560	31.94	1.76
Independent	Dr. V. Vigneswaran	5,606	20.92	
NOTA	Nota	254	0.95	−0.79
Independent	Andoor Mathi	252	0.94	
DMDK	A. Gnanasegaran	246	0.92	
Amma Makkal Munnettra Kazagam	T. Rajendiran	153	0.57	
Margin of victory		2,214	8.26	3.97
Turnout		26,798	84.92	1.74
Registered electors		31,557		2.95
AINRC hold		Swing	5.73	

=== Assembly Election 2016 ===
2016 Puducherry Legislative Assembly election: Nedungadu
Party	Candidate	Votes	%	±%
AINRC	Chandira Priyanga	8,789	34.47	
INC	A. Marimottou	7,695	30.18	
AIADMK	G. Panneer Selvam	2,957	11.60	
Independent	Jayaseelan	1,806	7.08	
Independent	Anandhan	1,594	6.25	
Independent	R. Mahendiran	828	3.25	
BJP	U. Kamaraj	711	2.79	
NOTA	None of the Above	444	1.74	
CPI	P. Mathiazhagan	277	1.09	
PMK	Munisamy	223	0.87	
NTK	Dhanabal	167	0.66	
Margin of victory		1,094	4.29	−28.77
Turnout		25,496	83.18	−1.09
Registered electors		30,653		14.00
AINRC hold		Swing	-20.58	

=== Assembly Election 2011 ===
2011 Puducherry Legislative Assembly election: Nedungadu
Party	Candidate	Votes	%	±%
AINRC	M. Chandirakasu	12,474	55.05	
Independent	A. Marimuthu	4,984	22.00	
Independent	R. Vadivelu	4,340	19.15	
Independent	N. Ramesh Kumar	330	1.46	
Independent	Sankar	311	1.37	
Independent	N. Ravichandiran	219	0.97	
Margin of victory		7,490	33.06	27.13
Turnout		22,658	84.27	−4.14
Registered electors		26,888		68.19
AINRC gain from Independent		Swing	11.59	

=== Assembly Election 2006 ===
2006 Pondicherry Legislative Assembly election: Nedungadu
Party	Candidate	Votes	%	±%
Independent	A. Marimuthu	6,143	43.47	
INC	M. Chandirakasu	5,306	37.54	−7.81
AIADMK	R. Vaithinathan	2,106	14.90	−0.97
MDMK	K. M. Kaliyaperumal	362	2.56	
BSP	Suba Sureshrajan	127	0.90	
CPI(ML)L	K. Ganesan	89	0.63	
Margin of victory		837	5.92	−2.48
Turnout		14,133	88.40	12.23
Registered electors		15,987		−3.49
Independent gain from INC		Swing	-1.89	

=== Assembly Election 2001 ===
2001 Pondicherry Legislative Assembly election: Nedungadu
Party	Candidate	Votes	%	±%
INC	M. Chandirakasu	5,720	45.35	4.62
DMK	A. Marimuthu	4,660	36.95	−17.98
AIADMK	P. Packirisamy	2,002	15.87	
Independent	Rajeswari	230	1.82	
Margin of victory		1,060	8.40	−5.79
Turnout		12,612	76.17	0.43
Registered electors		16,565		7.17
INC gain from DMK		Swing	-9.89	

=== Assembly Election 1996 ===
1996 Pondicherry Legislative Assembly election: Nedungadu
Party	Candidate	Votes	%	±%
DMK	A. Marimuthu	6,899	54.93	10.18
INC	M. Chandirakasu	5,116	40.74	−14.51
CPI(M)	M. Kaliaperumal	479	3.81	
Independent	S. Rajendiran	65	0.52	
Margin of victory		1,783	14.20	3.70
Turnout		12,559	83.17	7.43
Registered electors		15,457		5.72
DMK gain from INC		Swing	-0.31	

=== Assembly Election 1991 ===
1991 Pondicherry Legislative Assembly election: Nedungadu
Party	Candidate	Votes	%	±%
INC	M. Chandirakasu	5,955	55.25	−0.43
DMK	S. A. Marimuthu	4,824	44.75	
Margin of victory		1,131	10.49	−21.82
Turnout		10,779	75.75	−1.37
Registered electors		14,621		0.77
INC hold		Swing	-0.43	

=== Assembly Election 1990 ===
1990 Pondicherry Legislative Assembly election: Nedungadu
Party	Candidate	Votes	%	±%
INC	M. Chandirakasu	6,174	55.68	−11.93
Independent	R. Kuppusamy	2,591	23.37	
CPI	P. Thangarasu	1,265	11.41	
PMK	G. Raja	590	5.32	
Independent	R. Gurusamy	424	3.82	
Margin of victory		3,583	32.31	−4.50
Turnout		11,089	77.12	−2.28
Registered electors		14,509		31.64
INC hold		Swing	-11.93	

=== Assembly Election 1985 ===
1985 Pondicherry Legislative Assembly election: Nedungadu
Party	Candidate	Votes	%	±%
INC	M. Chandirakasu	5,870	67.60	
CPI(M)	M. Kaliaperumal	2,674	30.80	
Independent	V. K. Thangavelu	139	1.60	
Margin of victory		3,196	36.81	−5.49
Turnout		8,683	79.40	−4.05
Registered electors		11,022		14.47
INC gain from INC(I)		Swing	2.37	

=== Assembly Election 1980 ===
1980 Pondicherry Legislative Assembly election: Nedungadu
Party	Candidate	Votes	%	±%
INC(I)	M. Chandirakasu	4,981	65.23	
AIADMK	P. Natesan	1,751	22.93	−16.22
CPI	R. Gurusamy	904	11.84	
Margin of victory		3,230	42.30	40.88
Turnout		7,636	83.45	6.44
Registered electors		9,629		2.95
INC(I) gain from AIADMK		Swing	26.08	

=== Assembly Election 1977 ===
1977 Pondicherry Legislative Assembly election: Nedungadu
Party	Candidate	Votes	%	±%
AIADMK	P. Selvaraj	2,789	39.15	7.92
INC	R. Kuppusamy	2,688	37.73	−3.45
DMK	M. Packirisamy	995	13.97	−12.57
JP	A. Munisamy	652	9.15	
Margin of victory		101	1.42	−8.53
Turnout		7,124	77.00	−10.59
Registered electors		9,353		13.15
AIADMK gain from INC		Swing	-2.03	

=== Assembly Election 1974 ===
1974 Pondicherry Legislative Assembly election: Nedungadu
Party	Candidate	Votes	%	±%
INC	R. Coupousamy	2,934	41.18	−8.98
AIADMK	P. Selvaraj	2,225	31.23	
DMK	N. Rasangam	1,891	26.54	−23.30
CPI(M)	M. Kaliaperumal	75	1.05	
Margin of victory		709	9.95	9.63
Turnout		7,125	87.59	−2.28
Registered electors		8,266		18.12
INC hold		Swing	-8.98	

=== Assembly Election 1969 ===
1969 Pondicherry Legislative Assembly election: Nedungadu
Party	Candidate	Votes	%	±%
INC	P. Shanmugam	3,103	50.16	−15.43
DMK	A. Savundararangan	3,083	49.84	
Margin of victory		20	0.32	−30.87
Turnout		6,186	89.87	3.72
Registered electors		6,998		5.26
INC hold		Swing	-15.43	

=== Assembly Election 1964 ===
1964 Pondicherry Legislative Assembly election: Nedungadu
Party	Candidate	Votes	%	±%
INC	P. Shanmugam	3,697	65.60	
Independent	Maric Paul Andre Alias Paul	1,939	34.40	
Margin of victory		1,758	31.19	
Turnout		5,636	86.15	
Registered electors		6,648		
INC win (new seat)				

== See also ==
- List of constituencies of the Puducherry Legislative Assembly
- Karaikal district
