= R. Viswanathan (diplomat) =

Rengaraj Viswanathan

Ambassador of India to Argentina, Uruguay, and Paraguay
- In office October 2007 – May 2012

Joint Secretary of Latin America & Caribbean Division (LAC)
- In office September 2003 – September 2007

Ambassador of India to Venezuela
- In office October 2000 – August 2003

Consul General of India to Sao Paulo
- In office April 1996 – July 2000

Ambassador Rengaraj Viswanathan is the leading Indian expert on Latin America. He promotes understanding of Latin America and India-Latin America relations through speeches, blogs, articles and books. He advises Indian companies on business with Latin America. He speaks Spanish and Portuguese.

== Diplomatic posts ==
He had worked in Latin America for 12 years in his diplomatic postings in Brazil, Argentina and Venezuela. As Head of the Latin America division in the Ministry of External Affairs of India he took unprecedented policy initiatives creating a paradigm shift in India's relations with Latin America. He has visited every one of the 19 Latin American countries. He follows closely the political, economic and market developments as well as cultural trends. He has read a number of books on Latin America and has written reviews.

== Writing and speaking ==
For the last 18 years R. Viswanathan has been writing articles and giving lectures on Latin American politics, markets, and culture.

=== Writing ===
His publications on the Latin American region include:

- Guide for Business with Brazil - January 1997
- A Market Study of Mercosur - June 1997
- Business with Venezuela - January 2001
- Business with Andean Community - April 2001
- Business with Latin America, 2nd edition - February 2005
- Business with Argentina, Uruguay and Paraguay, 2nd edition - January 2010
- Malgudi to Macondo - the journey of an innocent Indian through the seductive Latin America - August 2012 - published by Indo-Latin American Chamber
