= Kamaraj Nagar =

Coordinates: 11°53′40.43″N 79°48′19.73″E

Kamaraj Nagar is a residential area of Pondicherry Town in the Union Territory of Puducherry, India.

It is surrounded by Chinna Subrayapillai Street in the east, Kazhini (Paddy Fields) in the south, Government Primary Health Center and Sollai Counder Street in the North and Church of Our Lady of Good Health in the West. Kamaraj Nagar is cool and greenery with Concrete roads.

Old Name for Kamaraj Nagar is Pudavaikaran Thope. As the name indicates this area was once a thope (garden) property of a textile merchant which in Tamil called as Pudavaikaran Thope.

== Streets of Kamaraj Nagar ==
There are only 4 streets in Kamaraj Nagar. First and Second Cross bisects Third and Fourth Cross perpendicularly.

=== First Cross ===
This street once held Government Branch Library, Ariyankuppam and Bharath English High School. Annual Day Function of Bharath English High School was celebrated here. Also Vimco Volleyball Tournament held many times in the ground opposite to the School.

=== Second Cross ===
Anganvadi (preschool), Ariyankuppam is located in this street

=== Third Cross ===
The first brick built house of Kamaraj Nagar was constructed in this street in the year 1980. During those period, when there is no water supply network to this area, Water pipe was extended by this house owner on his own expenses from nearby point which at 200 feet from his premise. Now entire Kamaraj Nagar have all facilities including Concrete Roads, Electricity, Water Supply, Telephone Network and Cable Network.

=== Fourth Cross ===
Government Training Institute located here giving training to ladies in the field of Dressmaking and Tailoring.

== Getting There ==
Kamaraj Nagar is just 300 meters from Ariyankuppam Bus Stop. One can reach Ariyankuppam by any Local bus from Pondicherry to Veerapattinam. Also you can catch any bus to Bahoor, Karaiyamputhur, Madukkarai from Pondicherry running via Ariyankuppam.
