= Vignesh Kannan =

Youngest MLA in south India

- VIGNESH KANNAN YOUNGEST MLA OF SOUTH INDIA

Member of the Puducherry Legislative Assembly
- Incumbent
- Assumed office 2026
- Preceded by: K. Lakshminarayanan
- Constituency: Raj Bhavan

Personal details
- Party: Dravida Munnetra Kazhagam
- Profession: Politician

Vignesh Kannan is an Indian politician from Puducherry. He is a member of the Puducherry Legislative Assembly from Raj Bhavan representing the Dravida Munnetra Kazhagam. He is the youngest MLA in south India.

== Political career ==
Vignesh Kannan won the Raj Bhavan seat in the 2026 Puducherry Legislative Assembly election as a candidate of the Dravida Munnetra Kazhagam. He received 7,304 votes and defeated V. P. Ramalingame of the Bharatiya Janata Party by a margin of 287 votes.
