= A. Johnkumar =

Indian businessman and politician

Member Of Legislative Assembly Puducherry
- In office 2 May 2021 – 4 May 2026
- Succeeded by: Jose Charles Martin
- Constituency: Kamaraj Nagar
- In office 24 October 2019 – 16 February 2021
- Preceded by: V. Vaithilingam
- Constituency: Kamaraj Nagar
- In office 19 May 2016 – 15 September 2016
- Preceded by: Om Sakthi Sekar
- Succeeded by: V. Narayanasamy
- Constituency: Nellithope

Civil Supplies & Consumer Affairs. DRDA. Community Development. Fire Services. Minority Affairs. Cabinet Minister
- In office 14 July 2025 – 4 May 2026

Member Of Legislative Assembly Puducherry
- Incumbent
- Assumed office 4 May 2026
- Preceded by: L. Sambath
- Constituency: Mudaliarpet

Personal details
- Born: 5 July 1965 (age 61) Puducherry, India
- Party: Bharatiya Janata Party
- Other political affiliations: Indian National Congress
- Spouse: Justine
- Children: Vivilian Richards & Villiams Regan & Victoria Rina
- Parent(s): R.S. Anthonisamy & Lourdumary

Anthonisamy Johnkumar is an Indian businessman and Member of Legislative Assembly from Nellithope, Puducherry. He is currently serving as a cabinet minister in Fourth Rangaswamy ministry since 2025.

== Political career ==
Johnkumar represented the Nellithope constituency of Puducherry and is a member of the Indian National Congress party. In 2016 Puducherry Legislative Assembly election, he defeated Om Sakthi Sekar of AIADMK in Nellithope by a huge margin. He was appointed the Parliamentary Secretary to the Puducherry Chief Minister. Followed by his resignation on his constituency in the legislative Assembly to enable Chief Minister V. Narayanasamy to contest a by-election before the deadline and become a member of the territorial assembly, he was appointed Special Representative of Puducherry administration in New Delhi in January 2017.

In 2019, JohnKumar contested and won the assembly by-election from Kamaraj Nagar constituency as a Congress candidate in Puducherry by a huge margin.

=== Joining BJP ===
On February 16, 2021, he left the Congress and later joined BJP. Earlier in December 2021, Chief of Pradesh Congress Committee A.V. Subramanian said that A. John Kumar was trying to switch sides to BJP due to the “fear of getting raided by the Income Tax Department.”

Supporters of John Kumar, representing Kamaraj Nagar constituency, staged a protest and sat in dharna in June 2021 in front of the BJP office demanding a ministerial seat for him in the AINRC-led NDA government. The BJP members pulled down the flex erected and tore the banners in the BJP office.

In 2021 Puducherry Legislative Assembly election, he contested as a Bharatiya Janata Party and he defeated M. O. H. F. Shahjahan of Indian National Congress in Kamraj Nagar by a huge margin.

He was later appointed as a cabinet minister.

== Income tax raids ==
Income tax officials found nearly ₹1.6 crore during a search of A. John Kumar's house at Nellithope in September 2016 just two days after he vacated his constituency for Chief Minister V. Narayanasamy to contest a by-election. At a press meet John Kumar said that as he had sold a piece of land a few days ago, he did not have any documents with him. The officials asked me to submit the documents to get the money back”. He had paid income tax accordingly and there was no tax evasion.

The Income Tax Office in Chennai conducted a search in November 2016 at the residence of A. John Kumar. I-T-T personnel reached his residence at Savaripadayachi Street in the Nellithope constituency around 7 a.m. and searched the house till around 4 p.m. Terming the move politically motivated, John Kumar told mediapersons “The raid was meant to disrupt the campaign of the Chief Minister." John Kumar disclosed the IT dept. seized Rs.14 lakh.

== Legal cases ==
A chargesheet was filed against A. John Kumar in a local court by Assistant Public Prosecutor for alleged suppression of information terming the move politically motivated, Mr. John Kumar told mediapersons. “The raid was meant to disrupt the campaign of the Chief Minister. I was asked not to leave the house”, on about his property in his affidavit when he contested the 2019 by-election from Kamaraj Nagar constituency and later won it. An FIR was registered earlier on the directions of Chief Judicial Magistrate in 2020 a complaint which alleged that John Kumar had not shown a property of more than two hectare land he purchased at Thirukkanur in his affidavit in 2019. This is because no FIR was filed by the police station on the same complaint in 2019.
