= Kamaraj Nagar Assembly constituency =

Constituency of the Puducherry legislative assembly in India

Coordinates: 11.939°N 79.823°E

Kamaraj Nagar
- Constituency No. 10 for the Puducherry Legislative Assembly
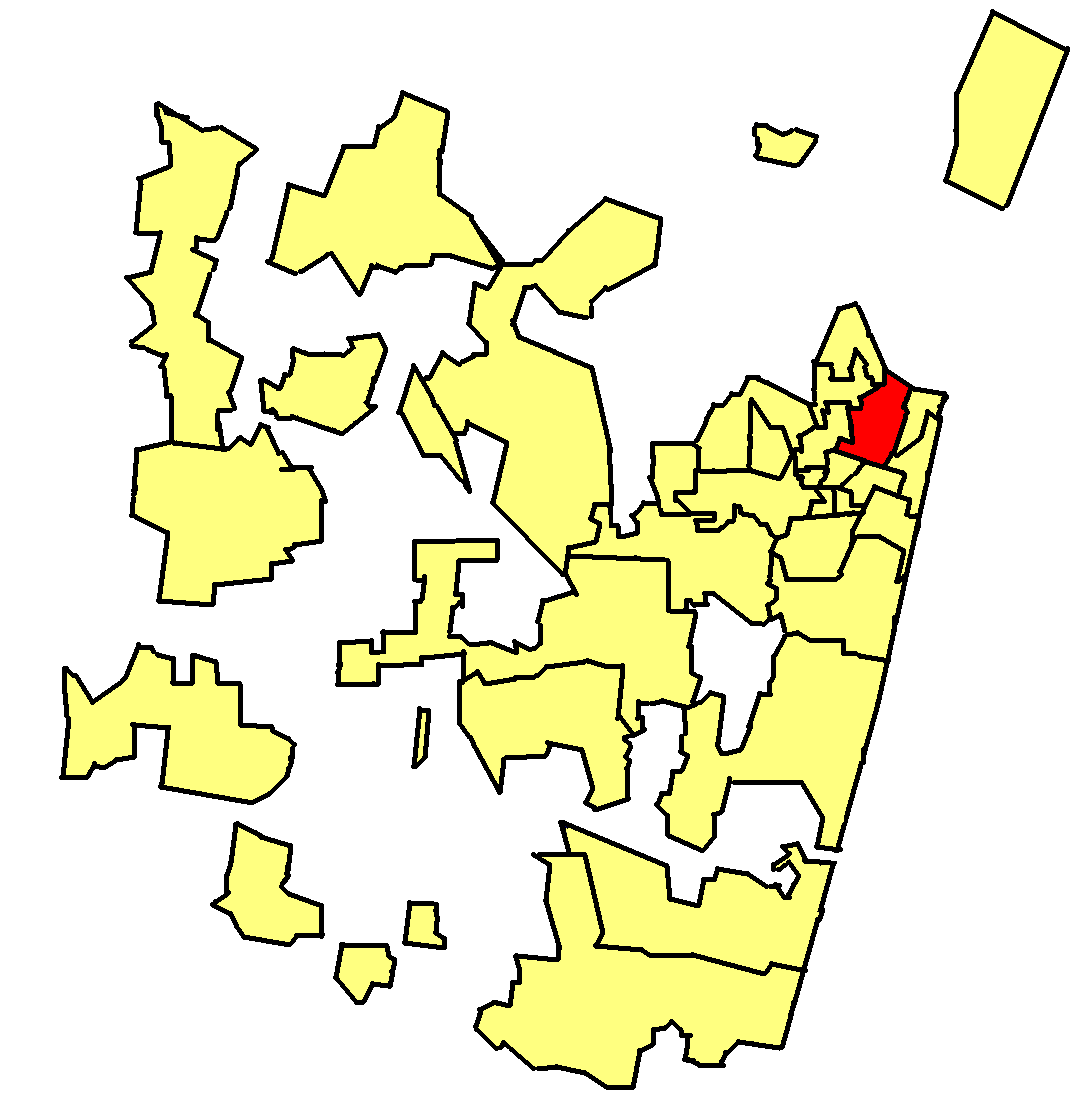

Constituency details
- Country: India
- Region: South India
- Union Territory: Puducherry
- District: Puducherry
- Lok Sabha constituency: Puducherry
- Established: 2008
- Total electors: 37,491
- Reservation: None

Member of Legislative Assembly
- 16th Puducherry Legislative Assembly
- Incumbent Jose Charles Martin
- Party: LJK
- Alliance: NDA
- Elected year: 2026

Kamaraj Nagar is a legislative assembly constituency in the Union territory of Puducherry in India. Kamaraj Nagar Assembly constituency was part of Puducherry Lok Sabha constituency.

== Segments ==
Brindavanam, Kamaraj Nagar, Krishna Nagar, Rainbow Nagar, Sithankudi, Venkata Nagar and Venkateshwara Nagar.

== Members of the Legislative Assembly ==
Year	Name	Party
2011	V. Vaithilingam	Indian National Congress
2016	V. Vaithilingam	Indian National Congress
2019 (Note: by-election)	A. Johnkumar	Indian National Congress
2021	A. Johnkumar	Bharatiya Janata Party
2026	Jose Charles Martin	Latchiya Jananayaka Katchi

== Election results ==
Vote share of Winning candidates
2026	53.14%
2021	56.11%
2019 by-poll	61.89%
2016	45.09%
2011	59.01%

=== 2026 ===
2026 Puducherry Legislative Assembly election: Kamaraj Nagar
Party	Candidate	Votes	%	±%
LJK	Jose Charles Martin	16,592	53.14	
INC	P. K. Devadoss	6,387	20.45	
TVK	Suman	6,289	20.14	
NOTA	None of the Above	440	1.41	
Majority		10,205	32.69	
Turnout				
Latchiya Jananayaka Katchi gain from BJP		Swing		

=== 2021 ===
2021 Puducherry Legislative Assembly election: Kamaraj Nagar
Party	Candidate	Votes	%	±%
BJP	A. Johnkumar	16,687	56.11	
INC	M. O. H. F. Shahjahan	9,458	31.80	
NOTA	None of the above	658	2.21	
Majority		7,229	24.31	
Turnout		29,741	78.65	
BJP gain from INC		Swing		

=== 2019 by-election ===
The by-election was held in 2019 following the resignation of the incumbent MLA, V. Vaithilingam, after he was elected to the Lok Sabha in the 2019 Puducherry Lok Sabha election.

2019 Puducherry Assembly by-election: Kamaraj Nagar
Party	Candidate	Votes	%	±%
INC	A. Johnkumar	14,782	61.89	
AINRC	Bouvanesvarane	7,612	31.87	
IND	C. Vetrriselvame	343	1.44	
Majority		7,170	30.02	
Turnout		23,884		
INC hold		Swing		

=== 2016 ===
2016 Puducherry Legislative Assembly election: Kamaraj Nagar
Party	Candidate	Votes	%	±%
INC	V. Vaithilingam	11,618	45.09	
AIADMK	P. Ganesan	6,512	25.27	
AINRC	B. Thayalan	3,642	14.13	
IND	L. Munisamy	1,241	4.82	
CPI	R. Viswanathan	857	3.33	
BJP	S. Ravichandran	764	2.96	
NOTA	None of the above	694	2.69	
Majority		5,106	19.82	
Turnout		25,769	77.39	
INC hold		Swing		

=== 2011 ===
2011 Puducherry Legislative Assembly election: Kamaraj Nagar
Party	Candidate	Votes	%	±%
INC	V. Vaithilingam	12,570	59.01	
CPI	Nara Kalainathan	6,541	30.70	
BJP	S. Ravichandran	1,009	4.74	
Majority		6,029	28.31	
Turnout		21,303	78.19	
INC win (new seat)				
