= Chandira Priyanga =

Indian politician

C. Chandira Priyanga

Member of Puducherry Legislative Assembly
- Incumbent
- Assumed office 19 May 2016
- Preceded by: M. Chandhirakasu
- Constituency: Nedungadu

Personal details
- Born: 1989
- Party: All India NR Congress
- Education: Annamalai University (BBA)

C. Chandira Priyanga is a politician representing the All India NR Congress. In May 2016, she was elected as a member of the Puducherry Legislative Assembly from Nedungadu (constituency).

== Political career ==
Priyanga was Pudcherry's first woman minister in 41 years. She defeated A. Marimuthu of Indian National Congress by 8,560 votes in 2021 Puducherry Assembly election. She is the daughter of former Puducherry minister M Chandirakasu.

Priyanga has also acted in a short film called Jhansi in 2019.

On October 10, 2023, Priyanga resigned from her ministerial role and submitted her resignation letter via her Secretary to the Chief Minister's office, citing caste and gender discrimination while in the role.

== Electoral History ==
Year	Constituency	Party	Votes	%	Opponent	Party	Votes	%	Result	Margin	%
2026	Nedungadu (SC)	AINRC	9,869	34.71	Dr. V. Vigneswaran	IND	14,368	50.54	Lost	▼4,499	▼15.83
2021	Nedungadu (SC)	AINRC	10,774	40.20	A. Marimuthu	INC	8,560	31.94	Won	▲2,214	▲8.26
2016	Nedungadu (SC)	AINRC	8,789	34.48	A. Marimottou	INC	7,695	30.19	Won	▲1,094	▲4.29
