= R. Viswanathan (CPI politician) =

Indian politician

R. Viswanathan is an Indian politician and leader of Communist Party of India. He served as the Minister for Agriculture from 1996 to 1999. He was elected to the Puducherry Legislative Assembly four times from Reddiarpalayam constituency. He had been state secretary of CPI, state general secretary of AIKS, president of AITUC and CPI national council member.
