= Nellithope =

- village
- Country: India
- State: Tamil Nadu
- District: Thanjavur
- Taluk: Papanasam

Population (2001)
  - Total: 1,559

Languages
  - Official: Tamil
- Time zone: UTC+5:30 (IST)

Nellithope is a village in the Papanasam taluk of Thanjavur district, Tamil Nadu, India.

== Demographics ==
As per the 2001 census, Nellithope had a total population of 1159 with 784 males and 775 females. The sex ratio was 989. The literacy rate was 63.02.
