= Latchiya Jananayaka Katchi =

- Abbreviation: LJK
- President: Jose Charles Martin
- Founded: 14 December 2025 (10 months ago)
- Headquarters: 191, Villianur Main Rd, Pavazha Nagar, Reddiarpalayam, Puducherry - 605010
- Ideology: Technocracy
- Political position: Centre Right
- ECI status: Unrecognized; Registered Party
- Alliance: NDA (2026–present)
- Seats in Rajya Sabha: 0 / 245
- Seats in Lok Sabha: 0 / 543
- Seats in Puducherry Legislative Assembly: 1 / 30
- Number of states and union territories in government: 1 / 31

Election symbol
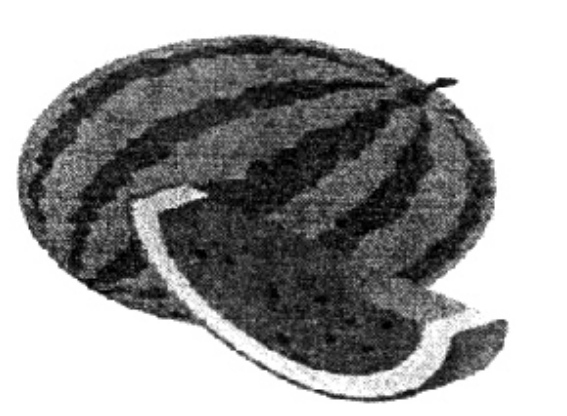

Website
- ljkofficial.com

Latchiya Jananayaga Katchi (LJK) is a political party in the Union Territory of Puducherry, founded by businessman Jose Charles Martin on December 14, 2025. The party is set to contest the 2026 Puducherry Legislative Assembly elections with the symbol of "Watermelon" allotted by the Election Commission of India.

== History ==
Jose Charles Martin, son of lottery businessman Santiago Martin, initially engaged in welfare activities in Puducherry through his outfit JCM Makkal Mandram. He subsequently converted the mandram into a full-fledged political party, announcing the launch on December 14, 2025.

The party's launch came a day after actor-politician Vijay addressed a mega public meeting in Puducherry. Charles Martin is the brother-in-law of Aadhav Arjuna, who serves as the General Secretary for Election Campaign Management of Vijay's Tamilaga Vettri Kazhagam (TVK).

== Ideology and Vision ==
Addressing the gathering at the party's launch, Charles Martin stated that Puducherry had been neglected for years and that people were suffering due to governance failures. He envisioned transforming Puducherry into the "world's number one city" and compared its potential to Singapore, Denmark, Bhutan, and Ireland.

Key issues raised by Martin include:

- Neglect of Puducherry by successive governments
- Lack of adequate healthcare facilities
- Unemployment and lack of job opportunities for youth
- Poor condition of Housing Board buildings
- Non-payment of wages to factory and sugar mill workers
- Lack of sports representation and alleged priority given to outsiders
- Sexual assault of women and attacks on those who raise their voice against it

Martin also criticized the existing political parties, stating that they have formed a "syndicate" and failed to address issues of unemployment, housing, providing clean drinking water, and good medical facilities.

== Latchiya Jananayaka Katchi joins NDA alliance ==
The Latchiya Jananayaka Katchi (LJK) joined the National Democratic Alliance (NDA) for the 2026 Puducherry Legislative Assembly elections. The party, led by Jose Charles Martin, was allocated two seats to contest under the alliance.

The inclusion of LJK, founded by Martin in December 2025, was finalized after Union Home Minister Amit Shah advised Puducherry Chief Minister N. Rangaswamy to accommodate the new entrant. This decision resolved internal friction within the NDA, as Rangaswamy had initially opposed LJK's inclusion due to concerns over its leader's family links to lottery sales. In the election, LJK won one seat (Kamaraj Nagar) out of the two it contested, securing 2.30% of the vote share.

Seat Sharing: Under the finalized arrangement, the All India NR Congress (led by Rangaswamy) contested 16 seats, BJP contested 10 seats, and both the AIADMK and LJK contested 2 seats each out of the 30 assembly constituencies.

=== Kamaraj Nagar ===
Jose Charles Martin, founder and leader of LJK, contested from Kamaraj Nagar constituency. He won the seat by a comfortable margin, defeating Indian National Congress candidate P. K. Devadoss. Martin secured 16,592 votes (53.14% vote share), while Devadoss received 6,387 votes (20.45% vote share). The winning margin was 10,205 votes.

=== Nellithope ===
A. Djeacoumar, the LJK candidate from Nellithope constituency, lost the seat to V. Cartigueyane of the Dravida Munnetra Kazhagam (DMK). Djeacoumar secured 3,311 votes (13.37% vote share), while Cartigueyane won with 8,226 votes (33.21% vote share). The margin of defeat was 4,915 votes and lost his security deposit.

== Electoral performance ==
=== Puducherry Legislative Assembly ===
Year	Party Leader	Alliance	Contested	Seats won	Seats +/-	Vote %	Total Votes	Vote swing
2026	Jose Charles Martin	NDA	2	1 / 40	▲1	2.30%	19,903	New entry
