= Martin Group (company) =

Indian conglomerate

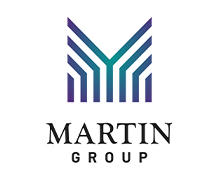
- Official logo
- Type: Private
- Industry: Conglomerate
- Founded: 1991; 35 years ago
- Founder: Santiago Martin
- Headquarters: Coimbatore, Tamil Nadu, India
- Area served: India
- Key people: Jose Charles Martin (Managing Director)
- Website: martingroup.in

Martin Group is an Indian conglomerate, headquartered in Coimbatore, Tamil Nadu, India. The group operates in lottery, construction, property development, hospitality, textile and fabric mills, educational institutions, sustainable energy, and media and entertainment.

== History ==
Martin Group traces its roots to Martin Lottery Agencies Ltd, which was founded by Santiago Martin in 1988 in Coimbatore. Its original business was the two-digit lottery. From lottery, the company later expanded to construction, property development, hospitality, textile and fabric mills, educational institutions, sustainable energy, and media and entertainment.

From April 12, 2019, to January 24, 2024, the firm purchased electoral bonds worth ₹1,368 crore, the highest among all companies, according to data released by the Election Commission.

== Martin Charitable Trust ==
In 2018 Gaja cyclone, the group contributed ₹5 crore to the Tamil Nadu Chief Minister's Relief Fund and provided relief materials valued at ₹2.94 crore.

In August 2019, the Martin Group donated ₹1 crore to the Assam Chief Minister's Relief Fund to support rehabilitation efforts in flood-affected areas of the state. The cheque was handed over to Chief Minister Sarbananda Sonowal.

In February 2021, The Martin Group, in collaboration with the Dr. A.P.J. Abdul Kalam International Foundation and Space Zone India Private Limited, organized an event in which 1,000 students from various parts of India assembled 100 FEMTO satellites. One of the satellites reportedly weighed less than 14 grams. The event was noted by the World Book of Records, London.

In May 2021, The Foundation contributed relief materials worth ₹3 crore to support COVID-19 relief efforts in Tamil Nadu. The contribution included oxygen concentrators, medicines, oxygen cylinders, oximeters, N-95 masks, hand sanitizers, and hygiene kits.

In December 2024, the Martin Foundation donated relief materials valued at ₹5 crore to support flood-affected families in Pondicherry District.

In August, 2024, the Martin Group of Companies donated ₹2 crore to the Chief Minister's Disaster Relief Fund to support the rehabilitation of Wayanad disaster victims. The donation was handed over to Pinarayi Vijayan, the Chief Minister of Kerala.

In May 2024, the Martin Group donated ₹44.21 lakh to the Dorcas Research Centre for Education, Art, and Culture to support a shelter for women with disabilities in Nungambakkam, Chennai. The funds were designated for the establishment of an adapted gym in Kamdar Nagar, featuring facilities tailored to the needs of women with disabilities.

In 2024, the Martin Group renovated the Corporation Middle School in Kavundampalayam, Coimbatore, under its School Adoption Program as part of its corporate social responsibility initiatives. The ₹7 crore project included the construction of modern classrooms, digital laboratories, a library, a multi-sports turf, improved restrooms, and upgraded security infrastructure. The school, which serves 413 students.

== Rocket launch ==
In February 2023, the Martin Foundation, in collaboration with the Dr. A.P.J. Abdul Kalam International Foundation and Space Zone India, launched the APJ Abdul Kalam Satellite Launch Vehicle Mission-2023 from Pattipolam village in Chengalpattu district, Tamil Nadu. The event was attended by Telangana Governor Tamilisai Soundararajan and aimed to promote space education among students.

The mission involved participation from over 5,000 students across India, including around 2,000 students from more than 100 government schools, who contributed to the design and development of 150 PICO satellites. Participants received a combination of virtual and hands-on training in satellite technology and space sciences, with the objective of encouraging interest in science, technology, engineering, and mathematics (STEM) education.

In August 2024, Space Zone India and the Martin Group launched Rhumi-1, India's first hybrid reusable rocket from ECR Beach, Pattipulam, Tamil Nadu. It marked the inaugural use of the country's first Hydraulic Mobile Launch System, which facilitates flexible and adaptable launches at angles ranging from 0 to 120 degrees. Hon’ble Minister of Civil Aviation, Mr. Kinjarapu Rammohan Naidu, and Hon’ble Minister of Environment of Tamil Nadu, Mr. Siva V. Meyyanathan, were also present at the event.

== Controversies ==
In 2007, Kerala’s state government, led by the Communist Party of India (Marxist), returned a ₹20 million donation from the Martin Group following allegations of illegal lottery operations.

In 2019, the Ministry of Home Affairs issued an alert to state governments regarding alleged fraudulent activities linked to the Martin Group, including claims of illegal lottery operations, tax evasion, and prize ticket manipulation. Reports stated that the company was accused of selling lotteries in states where they were prohibited and possessing unaccounted income exceeding ₹1,000 crore.

The ED attached assets worth ₹250 crore in 2019, ₹409.92 crore in 2022, and ₹411 crore in March 2022 from bank accounts linked to Future Gaming and associated companies under the Martin Group.

In 2022, the Chennai Crime Branch investigated the seizure of ₹7.2 crore in unaccounted cash from company premises; the case was closed in November 2022 following a court-accepted closure report.

In 2023, the Enforcement Directorate (ED) seized assets worth ₹4.5 billion in connection with an alleged lottery fraud case in Sikkim; the company’s appeal against the seizure was dismissed, though it has not been convicted in any of these cases.

In November 2024, the ED seized ₹8.8 crore in cash, mostly in ₹500 notes, from the Martin Group’s corporate office during searches in Tamil Nadu, Haryana, Punjab, and West Bengal. The agency stated the case involved alleged fraudulent and illegal lottery sales.

In December 2024, the Supreme Court of India barred the Enforcement Directorate (ED) from accessing electronic devices seized during searches at offices and premises linked to the Martin Group and its associates. The Court observed that digital devices hold sensitive personal and business information, and unrestricted access could infringe the right to privacy.

The order has been seen as an important precedent for investigations involving digital evidence. The ED has alleged irregularities in the operations of Future Gaming and Hotel Services Pvt. Ltd., a flagship company of the group, and attached assets worth over ₹600 crore in connection with money laundering probes.

=== Electoral bonds ===
According to data released by the Election Commission of India and reported in the media, between April 2019 and January 2024 the Martin Group purchased electoral bonds worth ₹1,368 crore. Of this amount, ₹542 crore (39.6%) was donated to the All India Trinamool Congress, ₹503 crore (36.7%) to the Dravida Munnetra Kazhagam, and ₹154 crore (11.2%) to the YSR Congress Party. The Bharatiya Janata Party received ₹100 crore (7.3%) from Future Gaming, a Martin Group company and rs50 crore to the Indian National Congress.
