= Chanchala =

Chanchala is a Sanskrit adjective basically referring to the unsteady vacillating nature of human mind and actions which need to be stilled, neutralized or controlled for gaining right speech and vision.

== Meaning ==
Chanchala (Sanskrit: चञ्चल) means 'inconsiderate', 'nimble', 'shaking', 'inconstant', 'moveable', 'flickering', 'moving', 'unsteady', 'fortune', 'wind', 'long pepper'.

== In Hinduism ==
Chanchala is the good word for 'vacillation' in Sanskrit language; in Sanskrit poetry the girl with the dancing eyes is called chanchalakshi, which is considered to be rare attribute. However, as part of the literary evidence of Kusana period, the word Chanchala, like Dhavani and Rodini, indicates the nature or action of Mother goddess. In the sixth chapter on Dhyāna Yoga in the Bhagavad Gita (Sloka 6.26):

यतो यतो निश्चरति मनश्चञ्चलमस्थिरम् |
ततस्ततो नियम्यैतदात्मन्येव वंश नयेत् ||

the word Chanchala used in the first line refers to the restless and the unsteady mind that wanders away.

Chanchala, meaning, 'the fickle-fortune', is one of the many names of Lakshmi. There is no mention of Lakshmi in the Rig Veda. Sri of the Rig Veda is deified as a personified being in the Yajurveda, and in the Atharvaveda (I.18) she is prayed to secure prosperity. Jatavedas Agni is repeatedly asked to make the goddess come to the votary; the epithet anapagamini reflects the chanchala i.e. fleet or fickle aspect of the goddess. Lakshmi or Chanchala as the mobile one associates only with the rich and the dynamic, no matter what their caste, creed or colour. Because Lakshmi is chanchala i.e. quick on her feet, to make her achala i.e. 'immobile', she needs to be worshipped quietly so that she does not get distracted.

=== In yoga ===
In Yoga, vritti indicates the contents of mental awareness that are disturbances in the medium of consciousness. The vrittis of the gunas are ever-active and swift, the gunas serve as parts of buddhi, their habitual conduct is fickle, restless, tremulous (chanchala) activity, which activity can be controlled through Abhyasa, Vairagya and Ishvarapranidhana. Sri Narada Pancharatnam (Sloka VIII.15) tells us that Chanchala is the nadi which along with Medhya resides in the Visuddha Chakra on the throat.

== In Sikhism ==
Dasam Granth, which like the Guru Granth Sahib is an important book of Sikhism, it is not composed in ragas (its first composition dates 1684 AD) tells us that Chanchala is the name a chhand or metre of sixteen syllables having ragan, jagan, ragan, jagan and laghu consecutively in each quarter, this metre is also known as Chitra, Biraj and Brahmrupak, and has been used twice in Choubis Autar.
