= Lakshmi Tantra =

Hindu text

Lakshmi Tantra लक्ष्मीतन्त्र
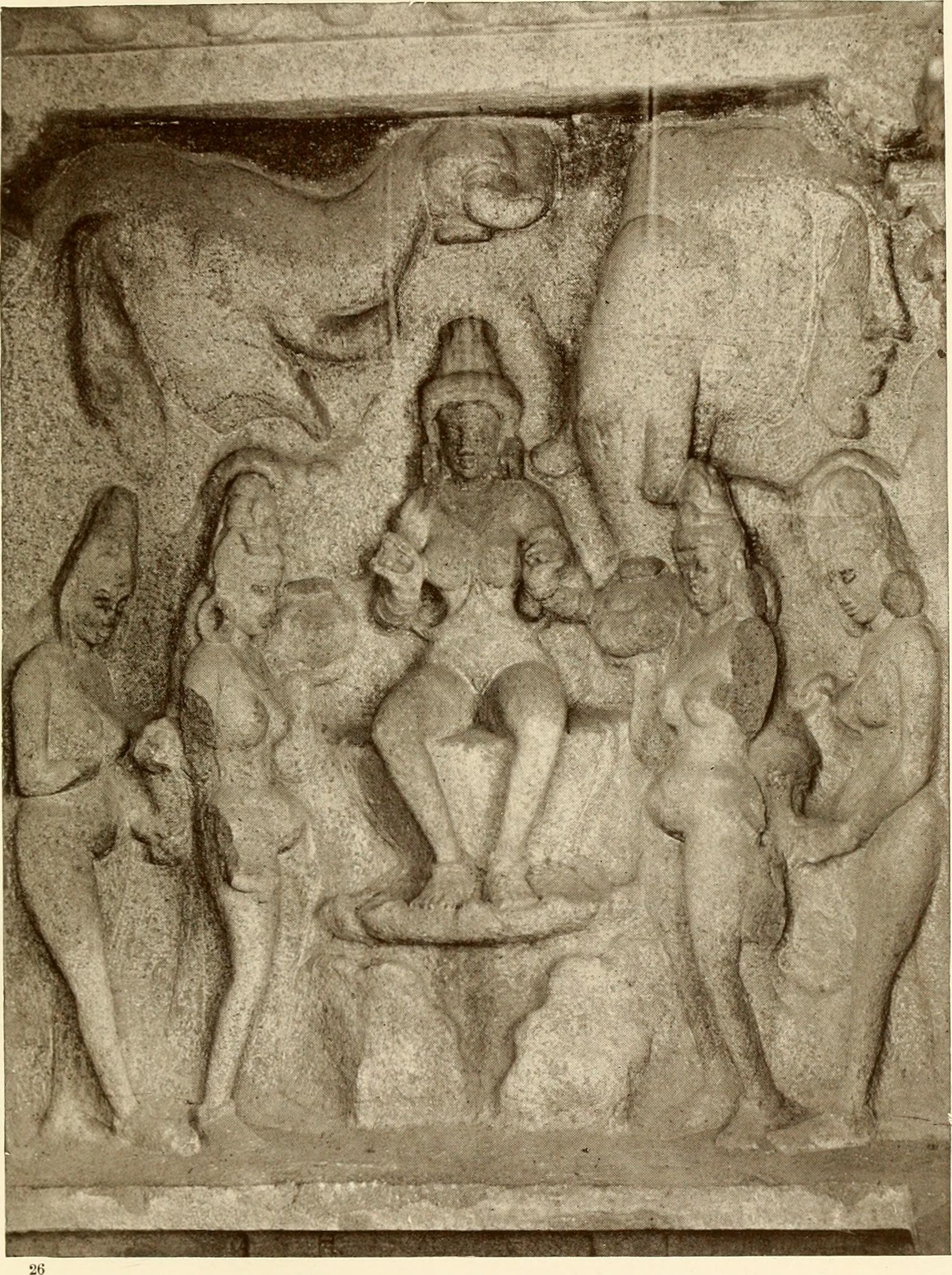
- Sculpture of Lakshmi emerging from the Ocean of Milk

Information
- Religion: Hinduism (Pancharatra)
- Language: Sanskrit
- Period: 12th-13th century CE

The Lakshmi Tantra (Sanskrit: लक्ष्मीतन्त्र, romanized: Lakṣmītantra) is one of the Pancharatra texts that is dedicated to the goddess Lakshmi and Narayana (Vishnu) in Hinduism. It forms a part of the Agamas. The Lakshmi Tantra is devoted to the worship of the goddess Lakshmi (the shakti of Vishnu-Narayana), although it also glorifies all women in general.

== Date and chronology ==
The precise date of compilation of the Lakshmi Tantra is uncertain. Initial scholarship estimated its composition between the 9th and 12th centuries, but later textual evidence places its final redaction between the late 12th and early 13th centuries CE. In her 1972 translation, Indologist Sanjukta Gupta estimated that the text was compiled between the 9th and 12th centuries. She noted that it could not be earlier than the 9th century due to internal evidence, such as the inclusion of the Buddha as an incarnation of Vishnu alongside the goddess Tara.

However, in the 2000 edition of her work, Gupta revised this dating based on newly published texts. Because the Lakshmi Tantra extensively quotes the 11th-century Saṃvitprakāśa and reflects theological ideas from Ramanuja and Kṣemarāja, Gupta concluded that the text must be later than these authors, assigning its final redaction to the late 12th or early 13th century CE. The latest possible date for its compilation is fixed by the fact that the earliest known author to directly quote the work is the celebrated Sri Vaishnava preceptor Vedanta Desika, who lived in the latter half of the 13th century.

== Philosophical influence ==
The Pancharatra Agamas, of which the Lakṣmī Tantra is a primary example, were highly authoritative in later Hindu philosophy. The broader Agamic literature heavily influenced philosophers such as the Dvaita proponent Madhvacharya, whose expositions and Bhāṣyas relied significantly on Pancharatra texts. The Lakshmi Tantra itself was explicitly utilized by the 13th-century Sri Vaishnava theologian Vedanta Desika, who quoted the work to support his doctrines in treatises such as the Nikṣeparakṣā. While later thinkers developed their own metaphysical approaches in addition to the traditional Pancharatra schema, the Pancharatra system itself provided a foundational framework for understanding how the Absolute Divine manifests into forms.

== Contents ==
The Lakshmi Tantra text includes information about Pancharatra philosophy, cosmogony and mantra sastra. The iconography for Lakshmi-Narayana and Vishnu’s Vyūhas is also discussed. The book does not include information about ritualistic worship, temple architecture and worship.

The text may also be categorized as Vaishnava, since it glorifies Lakshmi-Narayana as supreme:

Sakra: — O Goddess, who appearest from the milky ocean, wife of the God Padmanabha, I prostrate myself before Thee, who art lotus-born. Deign to explain who a living being is.
Sri: — The primordial, absolute I-hood of Hari is myself and I am the transcendental, supreme Goddess.

— Chapter 6

The Lakshmi Tantra is shown to have distinct similarities with the Pratik Rahasyam of Devi Mahatmya, showing an assimilation of Vaishnavas with Shakta-lore, which is extremely rare. The episode describing how the Supreme Shakti, Adi Mahalakshmi, transforms into her complete incarnation, Mahalakshmi or Mahasri, who is shown holding a mace, a shield, a citron, and a bowl. She is golden in colour, and on her crown she holds a lingam and a multi-headed snake which symbolizes the Trideva; linga meaning Shiva, yoni meaning Vishnu, and the snake representing Brahma. She represents the rajas guna. From here it is quite similar to what is seen in the Pratik Rahasyam, Mahalakshmi creates Mahakali/Mahamaya and Mahasaraswati/Mahavidya who represent the tamas guna and satva guna, respectively. However, unlike in the Pratika Rahasyam, where the Devis create the Trimurti and the Tridevi on their own, in the Lakshmi Tantra, Adi Purusha, or Parama Vasudeva, creates three of the Chaturvyuha, Pradyumna, Aniruddha, and Sankarshana. Pradyumna is linked with Mahasri, who create Brahma and Lakshmi (named as Padma), Sankarshana is linked with Mahamaya, creating Shiva and Saraswati, and Aniruddha and Mahavidya are linked together, creating Vishnu and Gauri/Parvati. Here, the union of male and female energies link to create srishti, or life.

Sri (Lakshmi) Yantra

The text expounds the specifics of the philosophy of qualified monism Vishishtadvaita, but it is also observed that it is heavily inspired by the philosophy of Pratyabhijna of Kashmiri Shaivism propounded by Abhinavagupta. The text also reveals traces of Mahayana Buddhism. The influence of the Bhagavad Gita is also apparent, and passages from it are sometimes quoted literally.

== Manifestations ==
The Lakshmi Tantra discusses the various avataras, or the descents, of the goddess, when Narayana incarnates on earth, to perform her anuvrata, or functions. These descents are called the six sheaths, and are categorised as possessing one form, two forms, four forms, six forms, eight forms, as well as twelve forms:

- Mahālakṣmī, as the first manifestation of the Goddess
- Śri and Puṣṭi, as two manifestations on either side of Narayana
- Śri, Kīrti, Jayā, and Māyā, as four manifestations around Narayana
- Śuddhi, Nirañjana, Nityā, Jñānaśakti, Aparājitā, and Prakṛti as six manifestations, in a hexagonal position
- Lakṣmī, Sarasvatī, Sarvakāmadā, Prītivardinī, Yaśaskarī, Śāntidā, Tuṣṭida, and Puṣṭi, as eight manifestations
- Śri, Kāmeśvarī, Kānti, Kriyā, Śakti, Vibhūti, Icchā, Prīti, Ratī, Māyā, Dhī, and Mahiman, as twelve manifestations, in a double hexagonal position

In the Dashavatara and the other incarnations of Vishnu, Lakshmi appears as Bhudevi or Varahi for Varaha, Anagha for Dattatreya, Padma for Vamana, Dharani for Parashurama, Sita for Rama, Revati for Balarama, Rukmini for Krishna, Rati for Pradyumna, Usha for Aniruddha, and Tara for Buddha.

== Bibliography ==
- Goyal, S. R. (1984). A Religious History of Ancient India, Upto C. 1200 A.D. Kusumanjali Prakashan.
- Winternitz, Moriz (1981). A History of Indian Literature Volume 1. Motilal Banarsidass. ISBN 9788120802643.
- Brill, Alan (2019). Rabbi on the Ganges: A Jewish-Hindu Encounter. Bloomsbury Publishing. ISBN 9781978778214.
- Iyengar, P. T. Srinivasa (1909). Outlines of Indian Philosophy. Theosophical Publishing Society.
- Gupta, Sanjukta (1972). Lakṣmī Tantra: A Pāñcarātra Text. Brill. ISBN 978-90-04-03419-8.
