= Shri Sulebhavi Mahalakshmi Temple =

Mahalakshmi of Sulebhavi
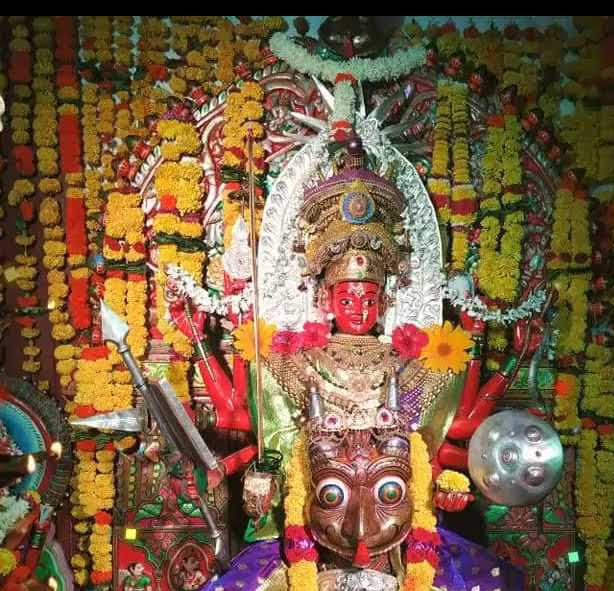

Religion
- Affiliation: Hinduism
- Deity: Mahalakshmi
- Festivals: Navaratri, Diwali, Dussehra

Location
- Location: Sulebhavi, Karnataka, India

Shri Mahalakshmi Ammanavara Temple is a Hindu temple located in Sulebhavi, Belgaum dedicated to the goddess Mahalakshmi. The temple is located in the village of Sulebhavi, approximately 17 kilometers from Belagavi in Karnataka, the temple is known for its unique tradition of devotees nailing coins into its wooden pillars and beams. This practice, which has been carried out for over 300 years, has led to the temple being referred to as the "Temple of Coins." The coins embedded in the structure, some dating back to the era of Queen Victoria and others from post-independence India, serve as a historical archive. The temple is believed to be over 1300 years old and draws devotees from Karnataka, Maharashtra, and Goa.

== Legend ==
The goddess of the temple is considered a jagurat (awakended).

== Worship ==
Every five years, the temple hosts a large, nine-day fair that attracts thousands of people. The presiding deity, Mahalakshmi, is worshipped as a multi-armed warrior goddess (Vijaya Lakshmi) riding a lion and is revered as a source of prosperity as well as power and protection. The temple is also noted for a natural phenomenon where the sun's rays touch the goddess's feet both at dawn and dusk. Due to preservation efforts, the tradition of nailing coins has been halted, with devotees now encouraged to use donation boxes instead.
