= Lakshmi =

Major Hindu goddess; goddess of wealth and beauty

- Mother goddess Goddess of wealth, prosperity, fortune, sovereignty, fertility, abundance, and beauty
- Member of Tridevi and Pancha Prakriti
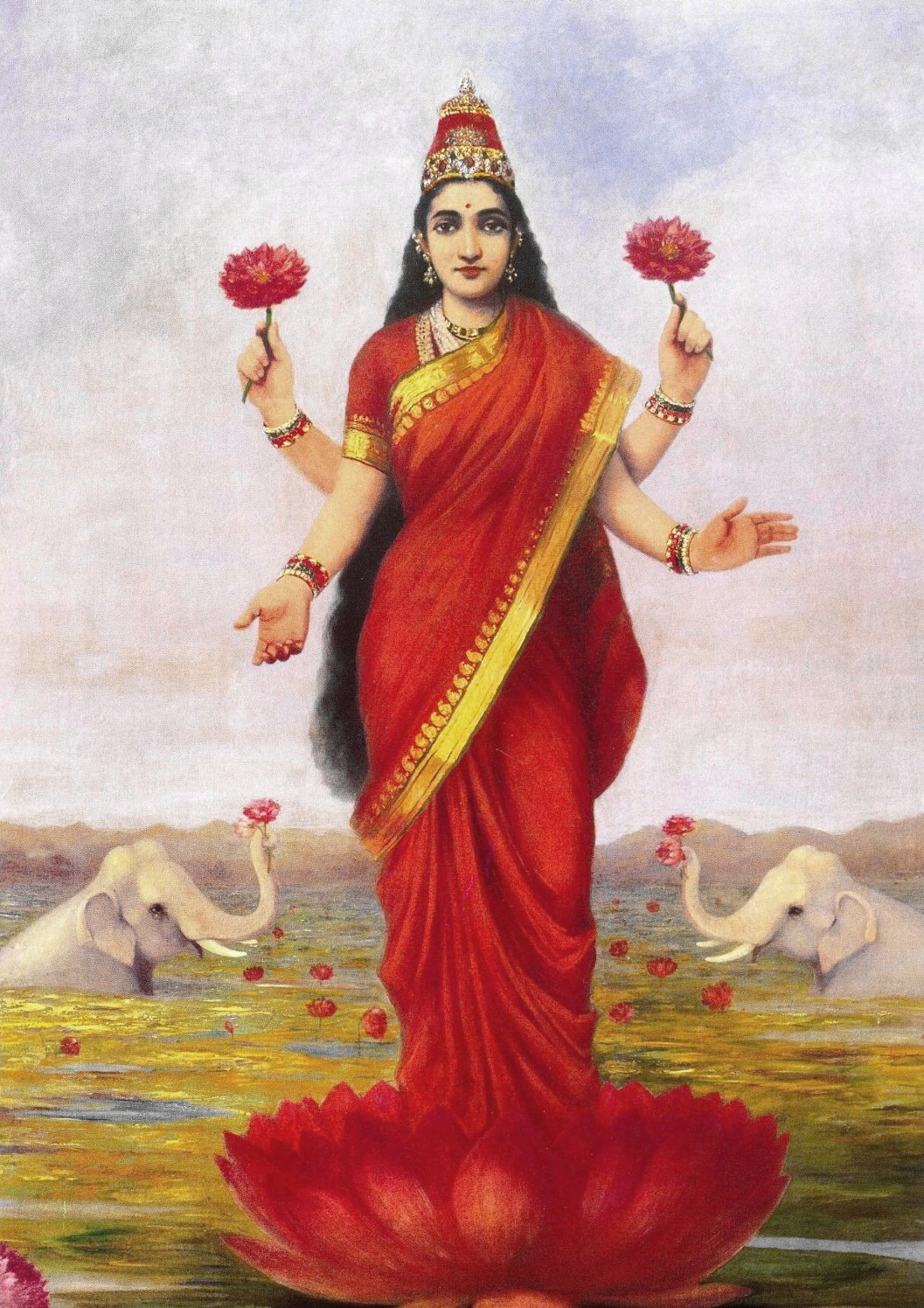
- Sri Gaja Lakshmi by Raja Ravi Varma (1896)
- Other names: Sri; Bhargavi; Kamala; Padma; Narayani; Vaishnavi; Madhavi; Jaganmata
- Devanagari: लक्ष्मी
- Affiliation: Devi; Shakti; Mahadevi; Tridevi; Ashta Lakshmi; Vaishno Devi; Sita; Radha; Durga; Tulasi; Bhumi; Lakshmi Narayana; Ashtabharya; Niladevi
- Abode: Vaikuntha; Manidvipa; Kshira Sagara
- Mantra: Oṃ Śrīṃ Mahālakṣmyai Namaḥ; Oṃ Śrīṃ Śriye Namaḥ; Śrī Sūkta
- Symbols: Shrivatsa; Padma (Lotus); Jnana Mudra; Abhaya Mudra; Varadamudra; Gold
- Tree: Tulasi
- Day: Friday
- Mount: Owl; Elephant
- Festivals: Deepavali; Lakshmi Puja; Sharad Purnima; Varalakshmi Vratam; Navaratri; Sankranti; Margashirsha Guruvar; Manabasa Gurubara; Ahoi Ashtami; Niladri Bije; Hera Panchami; Swanti; Ekadashi; Lakshmi Panchami

Genealogy
- Siblings: Alakshmi
- Consort: Vishnu

Lakshmi (/ˈlʌkʃmi/ LUK-shmee; (Note: This pronunciation has a closer approximation of the Hindustani pronunciation. More commonly pronounced /ˈlækʃmi/ LAK-shmee in the UK and US: /ˈlɑːkʃmi/ LAHK-shmee in the US.) Sanskrit: लक्ष्मी, IAST: Lakṣmī), sometimes spelled Laxmi and also known as Shri (Sanskrit: श्री, IAST: Śrī), is one of the principal goddesses in Hinduism, revered as the goddess of fortune, wealth, prosperity, beauty, fertility, sovereignty, and abundance. With Parvati and Sarasvati, she forms the trinity of goddesses called the Tridevi.

Lakshmi has been a central figure in Hindu tradition since pre-Buddhist times (1500 to 500 BCE) and remains one of the most widely worshipped goddesses in the Hindu pantheon. Although she does not appear in the earliest Vedic literature, the personification of the term shri—auspiciousness, glory, and high rank, often associated with kingship—eventually led to the development of Sri-Lakshmi as a goddess in later Vedic texts, particularly the Shri Suktam. Her importance grew significantly during the late epic period (around 400 CE), when she became particularly associated with the preserver god Vishnu as his consort. In this role, Lakshmi is seen as the ideal Hindu wife, exemplifying loyalty and devotion to her husband. Whenever Vishnu descended on the earth as an avatar, Lakshmi accompanied him as consort, for example, as Sita and Radha or Rukmini as consorts of Vishnu's avatars Rama and Krishna, respectively.

Lakshmi holds a prominent place in the Vishnu-centric sect of Vaishnavism, where she is not only regarded as the consort of Vishnu, the supreme being, but also as his divine energy (shakti). She is also the supreme goddess in the sect and assists Vishnu to create, protect, and transform the universe. She is an especially prominent figure in Sri Vaishnavism tradition, in which devotion to Lakshmi is deemed to be crucial to reach Vishnu. Within the goddess-oriented Shaktism, Lakshmi is venerated as the prosperity aspect of the supreme goddess. The eight prominent manifestations of Lakshmi, the Ashtalakshmi, symbolise the eight sources of wealth.

Lakshmi is depicted in Indian art as an elegantly dressed, prosperity-showering golden-coloured woman standing or sitting in the padmasana position upon a lotus throne, while holding a lotus in her hand, symbolising fortune, self-knowledge, and spiritual liberation. Her iconography shows her with four hands, which represent the four aspects of human life important to Hindu culture: dharma, kama, artha, and moksha. She is often accompanied by two elephants, as seen in the Gaja-Lakshmi images, symbolising both fertility and royal authority. The Gupta period sculpture and coins only associate lions with Lakshmi, often flanking her on either side.

Archaeological discoveries and ancient coinage suggest a recognition and reverence for Lakshmi by the first millennium BCE. Iconography and statues of Lakshmi have also been found in Hindu temples throughout Southeast Asia, estimated to be from the second half of the first millennium CE. The day of Lakshmi Puja during Navaratri, and the festivals of Deepavali and Sharad Purnima (Kojagiri Purnima) are celebrated in her honour.

== Etymology and epithets ==
Lakshmi in Sanskrit is derived from the root word lakṣ (लक्ष्) and lakṣa (लक्ष), meaning 'to perceive, observe, know, understand' and 'goal, aim, objective', respectively. These roots give Lakshmi the symbolism: know and understand your goal. A related term is lakṣaṇa, which means 'sign, target, aim, symbol, attribute, quality, lucky mark, auspicious opportunity'.

The meaning and significance of Lakshmi evolved in ancient Sanskrit texts. Lakshmi is mentioned once in Rigveda, in which the name is used to mean 'kindred mark, sign of auspicious fortune'.

भद्रैषां लक्ष्मीर्निहिताधि वाचि
bhadraiṣāṁ lakṣmīrnihitādhi vāci

— Rig Veda, x.71.2
Translation:

"an auspicious fortune is attached to their words"

— translated by John Muir

Another important name of Lakshmi is Shri (Śrī), and the relationship between the two names is both etymologically and conceptually significant in Hindu sacred literature. The name Shri pervades Vedic literature, including the Rigveda, where she is mentioned approximately 130 times across various hymns. In these contexts, Shri consistently denotes ideas of prosperity, fertility, success, and auspiciousness. The name Lakshmi, by contrast, is more prominently used in later Puranic literature. Nonetheless, both names refer to the same divine figure, with the distinction between them rarely emphasized in early texts. However, some linguists note that they carry slightly different connotations. "Śrī" tends to denote general prosperity and auspiciousness, while "Lakṣmī" refers more specifically to material wealth. In Tamil-speaking traditions, the name Lakṣmī is rendered as Ilakkumi or Tiru, the latter being the regional equivalent of "Śrī," highlighting her continuity and adaptability across linguistic and cultural contexts.

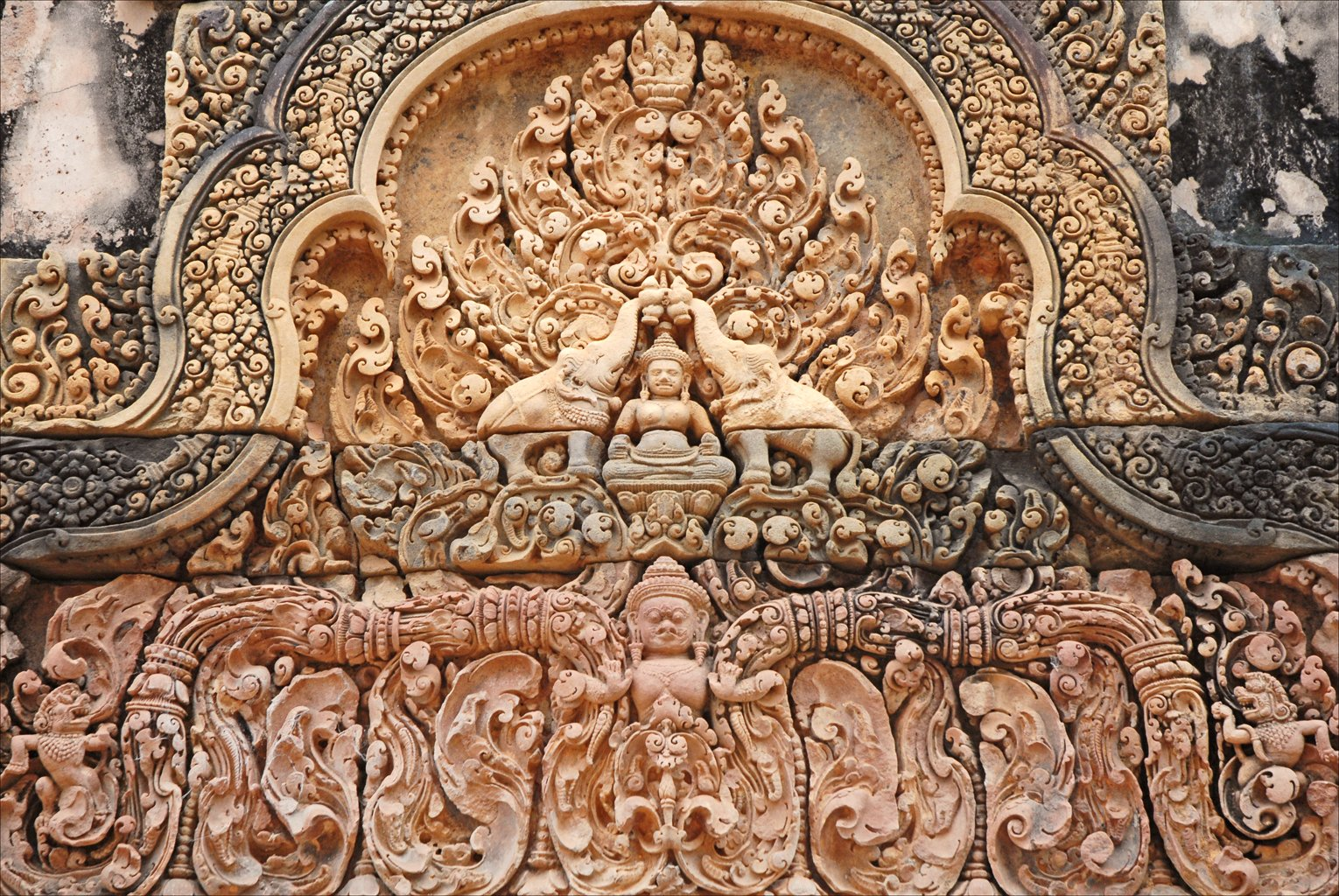
Gaja Lakshmi, Cambodia, ca. 944-968

Lakshmi has numerous epithets and numerous ancient Stotram and Sutras of Hinduism recite her various names: such as Sri (radiance, eminence, splendor, wealth), Padmā (she who is mounted upon or dwelling in a lotus or she of the lotus), Kamalā or Kamalatmika (she of the lotus), Padmapriyā (lotus-lover), Padmamālādhāra Devī (goddess bearing a garland of lotuses), Padmamukhī (lotus-faced-she whose face is as like as a lotus), Padmākṣī: (lotus-eyed - she whose eyes are as beautiful as a lotus), Padmahasta: (lotus-hand - she whose hand is holding [a] lotus[es]), Padmasundarī (she who is as beautiful as a lotus), Padmavati (She who was born from a lotus), Śrījā (Jatika of Sri), Narayani (belonging to Narayana or the wife of Narayana), Vaishnavi (worshipper of Vishnu or the power of Vishnu), Viṣṇupriyā (who is the beloved of Vishnu), and Nandika (the one who gives pleasure). Shaktas also consider Lalita, who is praised with 1,000 names in the Lalita Sahasranama, as Lakshmi.

Lakshmi Sahasranama of Skanda Purana praises Lakshmi as Mahadevi (she who is the great goddess), Mahamaya (she who is a great illusion), Karaveera Nivasini (the goddess who lives in Karaveera/Kolhapur) and Maha Astha Dasa Pithagne (she who has 18 great Shakta pithas). She is also praised as Mahalakshmi (she who is great Lakshmi), Mahakali (she who is great Kali), and Mahasaraswati (she who is great Saraswati) who are the primary deities in Devi Mahatmya. The other prominent names included in this text are Bhuvaneshvari (she who is the queen or ruler of the universe), Katyayani (she who is the daughter of sage Katyayana), Kaushiki (Shakti that came out of the sheath (or Kosha) of Parvati), Brahmani (she who is the power of Brahma), Kamakshi (she who fulfils desires by her eyes), Chandi (she who killed Mahishasura), Chamunda (she who killed Chanda and Munda), Madhu Kaidabha Bhanjini (she who killed Madhu and Kaidabha), Durga (she who killed Durgamasura), Maheshvari (she who is the power of Maheshvara), Varahi (she who is the power of Varaha, a form of Vishnu), Narasimhi (she who is the power of Narasimha, a form of Vishnu), Srividyaa (she who is Sri Vidya), Sri Manthra Raja Rajini (the queen of Sri Vidya), Shadadharadhi devata (she who is the goddess of the six chakras). Dutch author Dirk van der Plas wrote, "In Lakshmi Tantra, a text of Visnuite signature, the name Mahamaya is connected with third or destructive of Goddess' three partial functions, while in supreme form she is identified with Lakshmi".

Her other names include: Aishwarya, Akhila, Anagha, Anapagamini, Anumati, Apara, Aruna, Atibha, Avashya, Bala, Bhargavi, Bhudevi, Chakrika, Chanchala, Chandravadana, Chandrasahodari, Chandraroopa, Devi, Deepta, Dhruti, Haripriya, Harini, Harivallabha, Hemamalini, Hiranyavarna, Indira, Jalaja, Jambhavati, Janaki, Janamodini, Jyoti, Jyotsna, Kalyani, Kamalika, Ketaki, Kriyalakshmi, Kshirsha, Kuhu, Lalima, Madhavi, Madhu, Malti, Manushri, Nandika, Nandini, Nikhila, Nila Devi, Nimeshika, Padmavati, Parama, Prachi, Purnima, Radha, Ramaa, Rukmini, Samruddhi, Samudra Tanaya, Satyabhama, Shraddha, Shreeya, Sita, Smriti, Sridevi, Sudha, Sujata, Swarna Kamala, Taruni, Tilottama, Tulasi, Vasuda, Vasudhara, Vasundhara, Varada, Varalakshmi, Vedavati, Vidya, Vimala, and Viroopa.

== Iconography and symbolism ==
Goddess Lakshmi
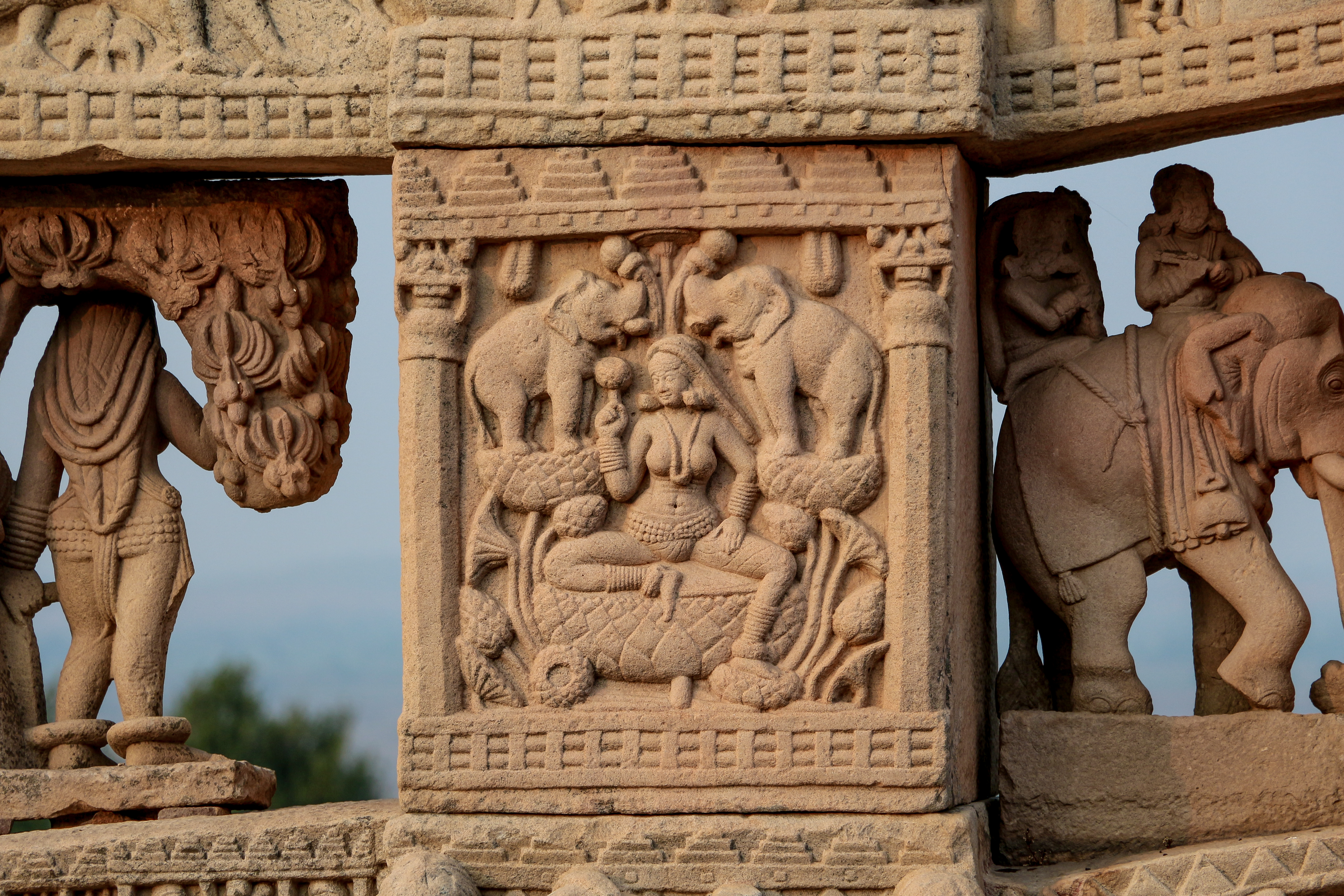
Sanchi Stupa, 1st century CE

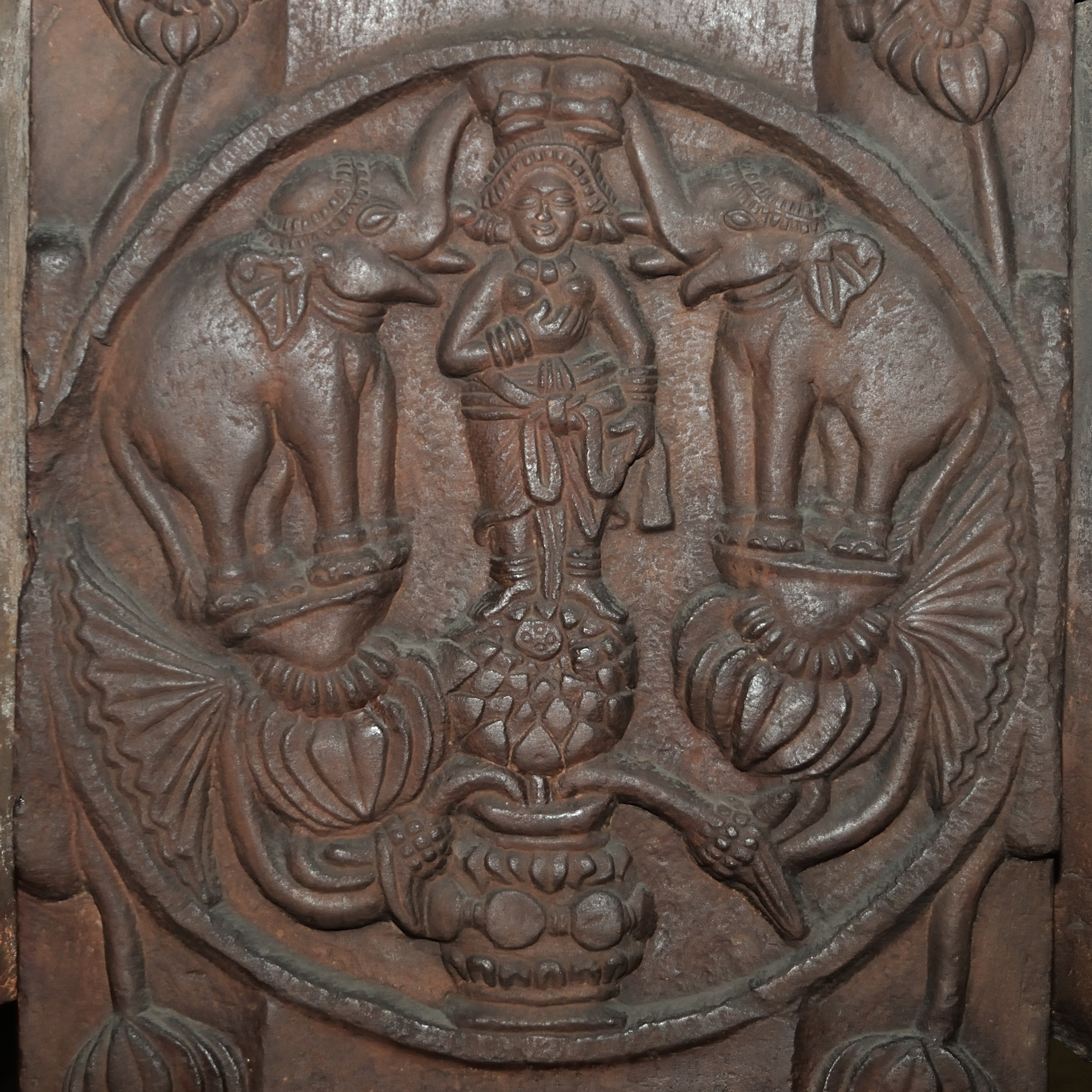
Bharhut Stupa, circa 110 BCE

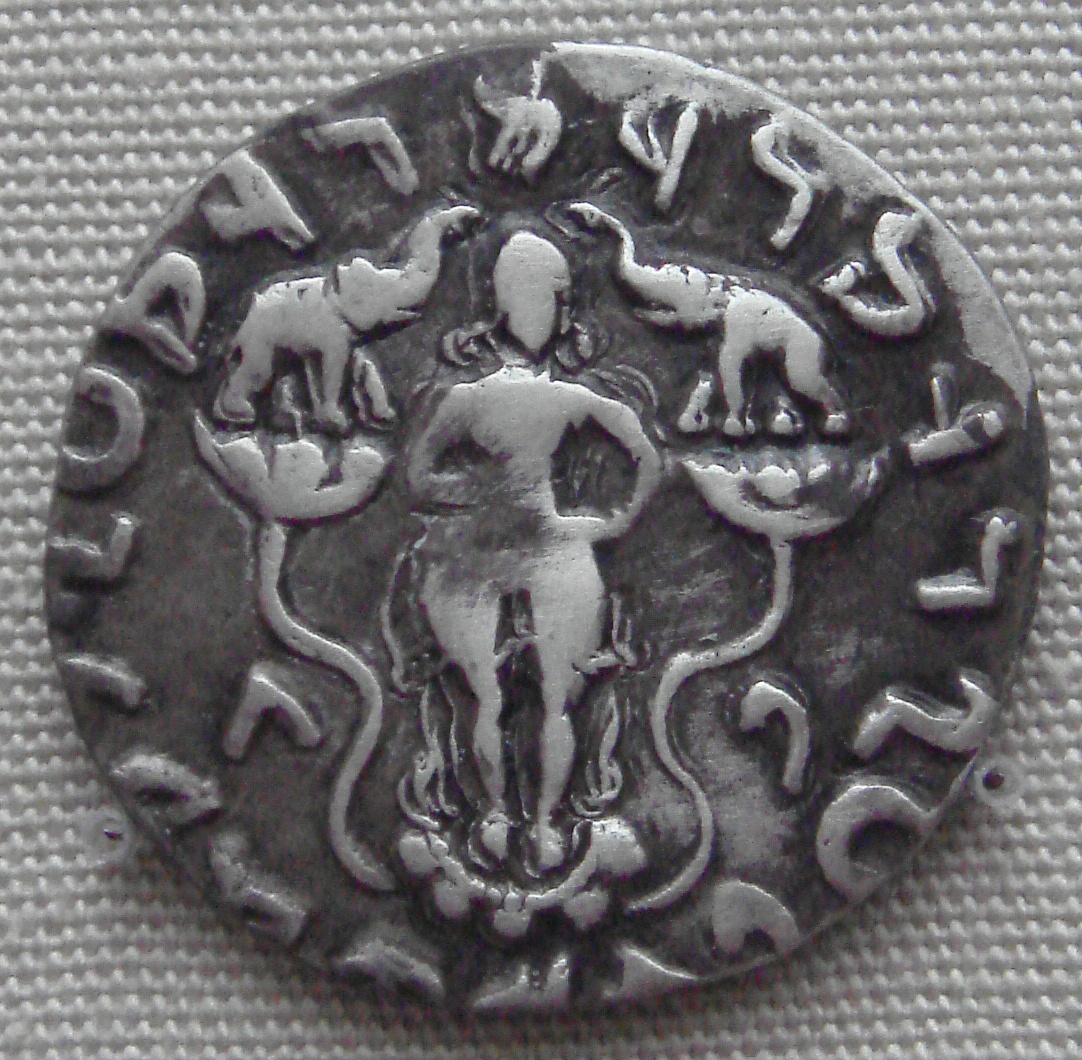
Coins of Gandhara, 1st century BCE

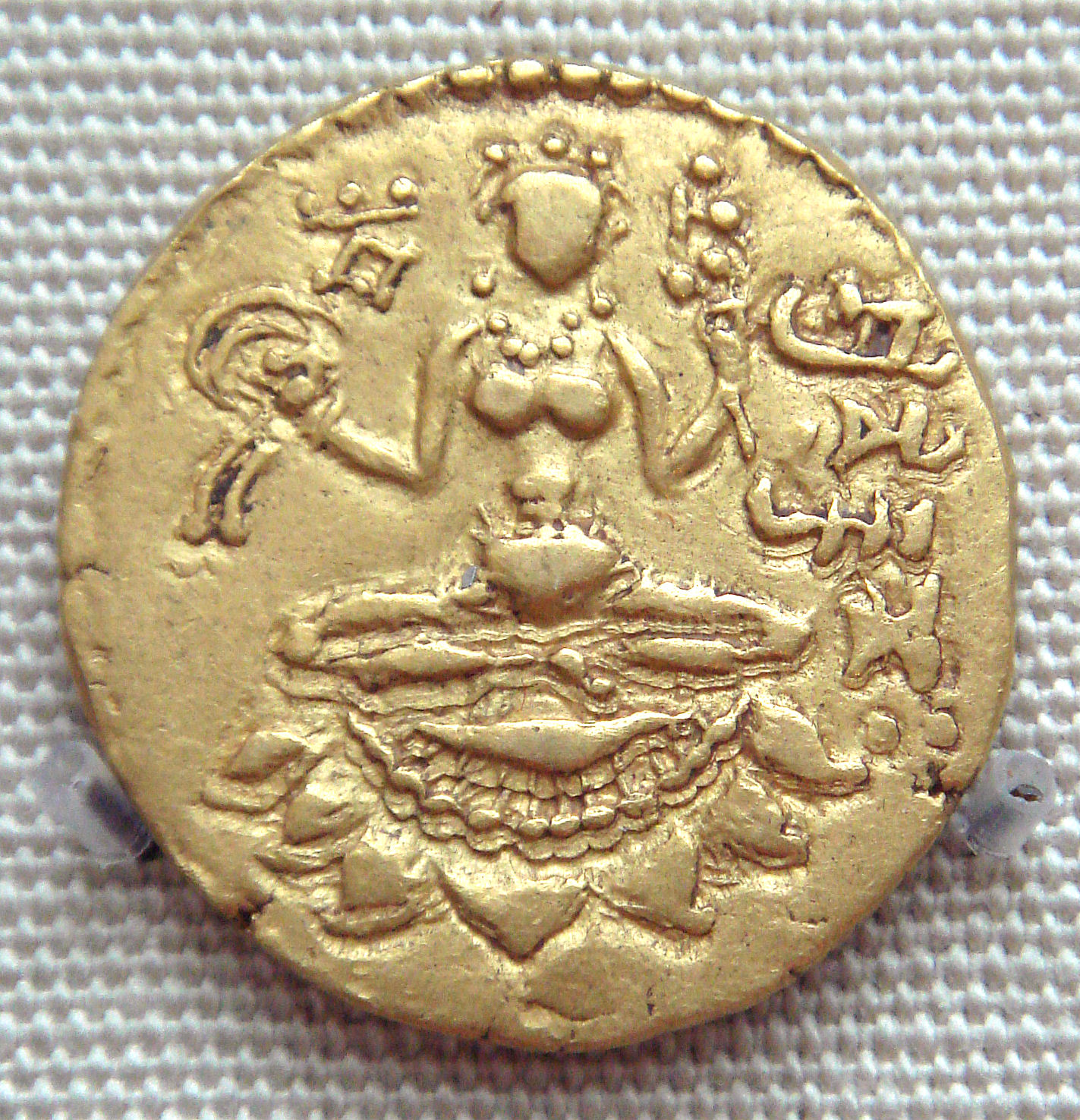
Coinage of Gupta Empire

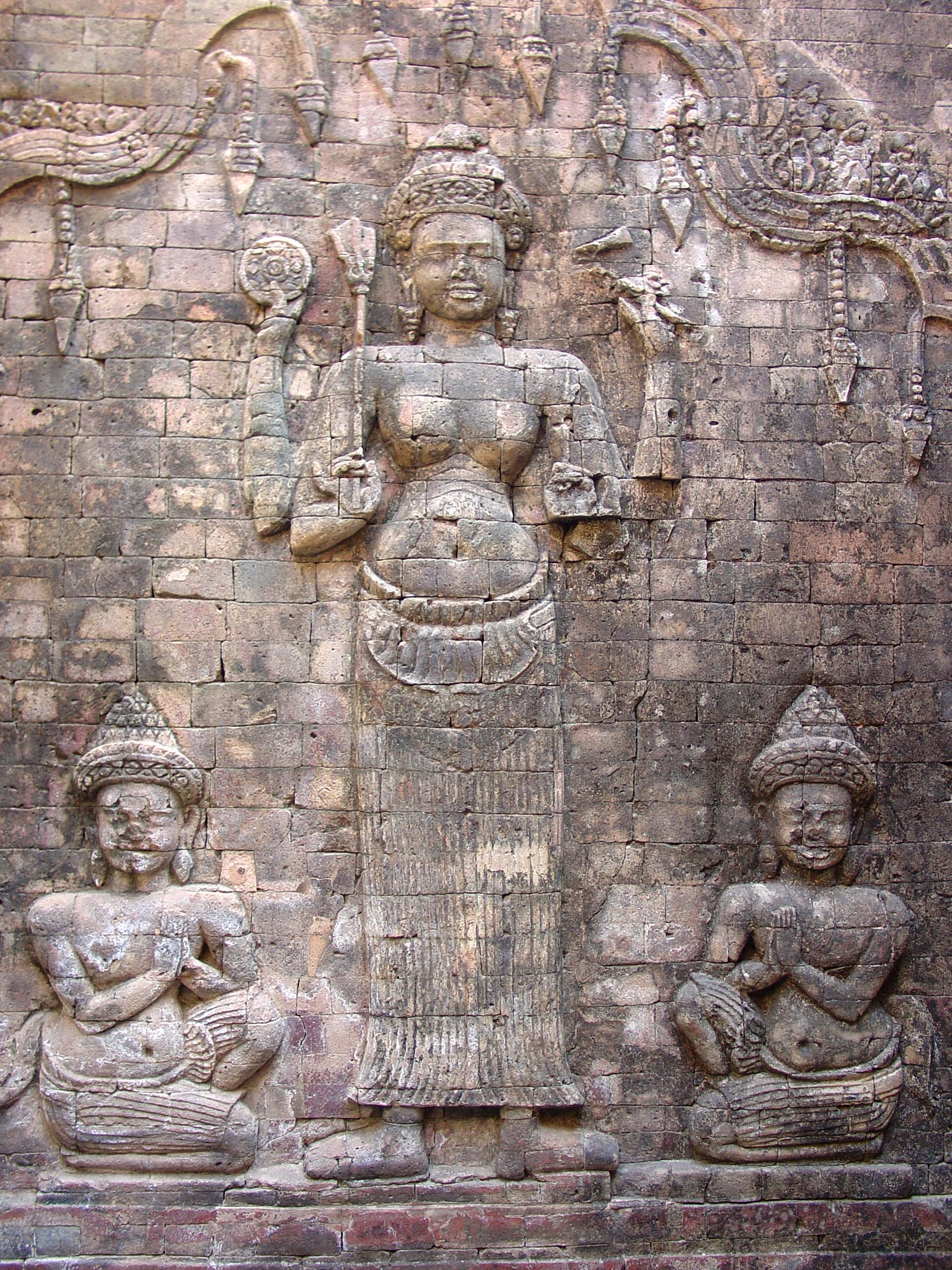
Cambodia

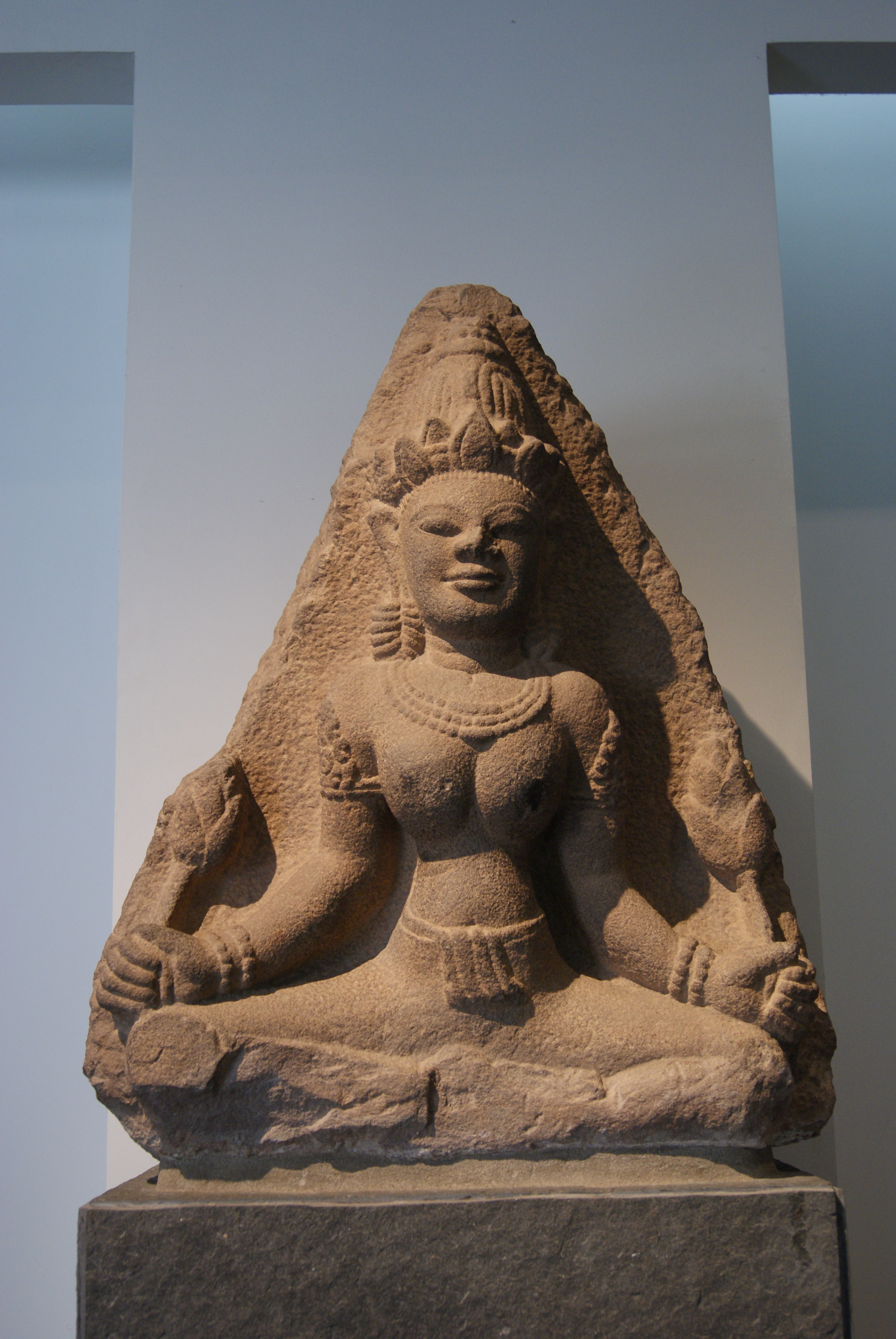
Vietnam, 10th century

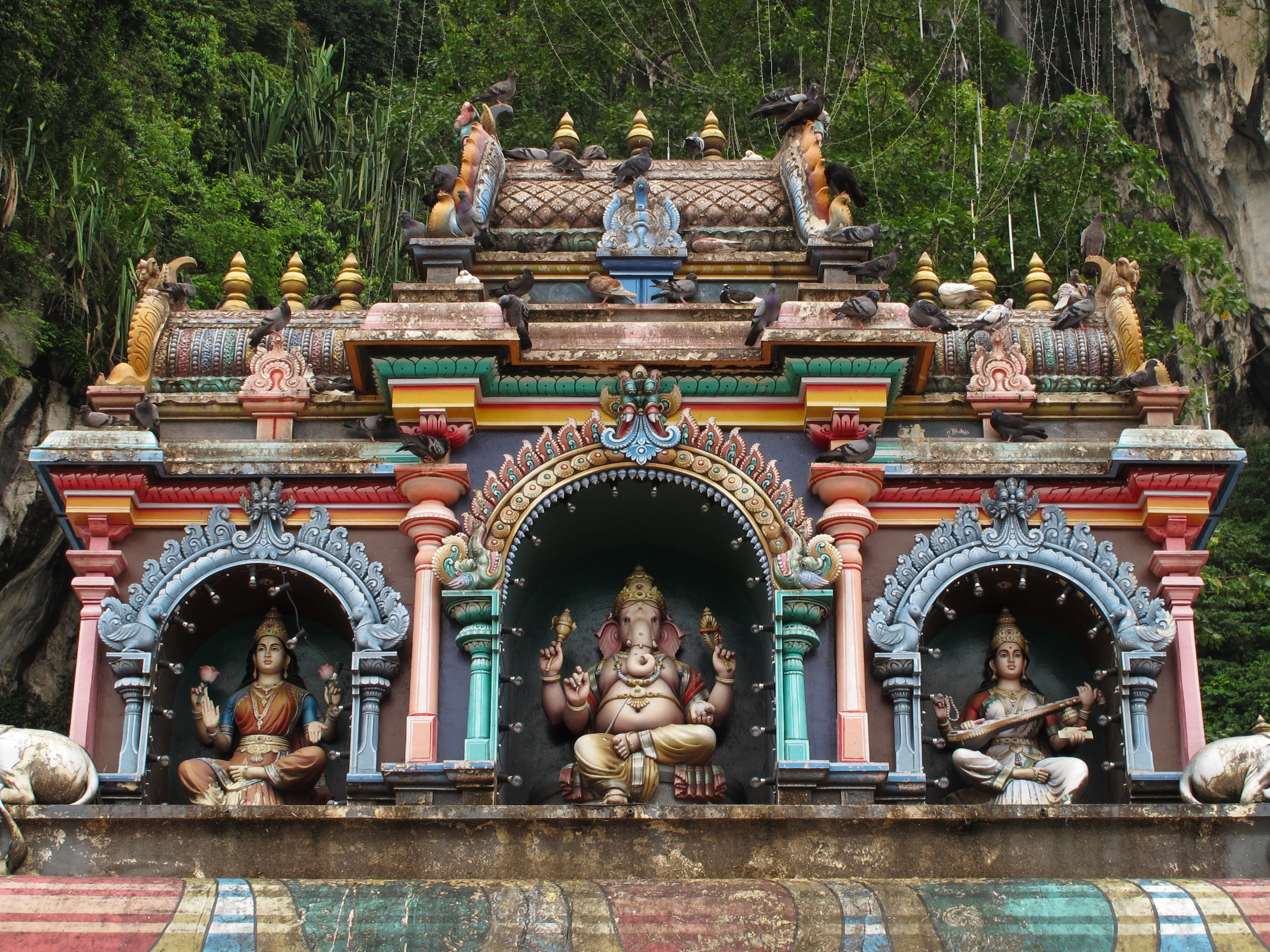
Malaysia

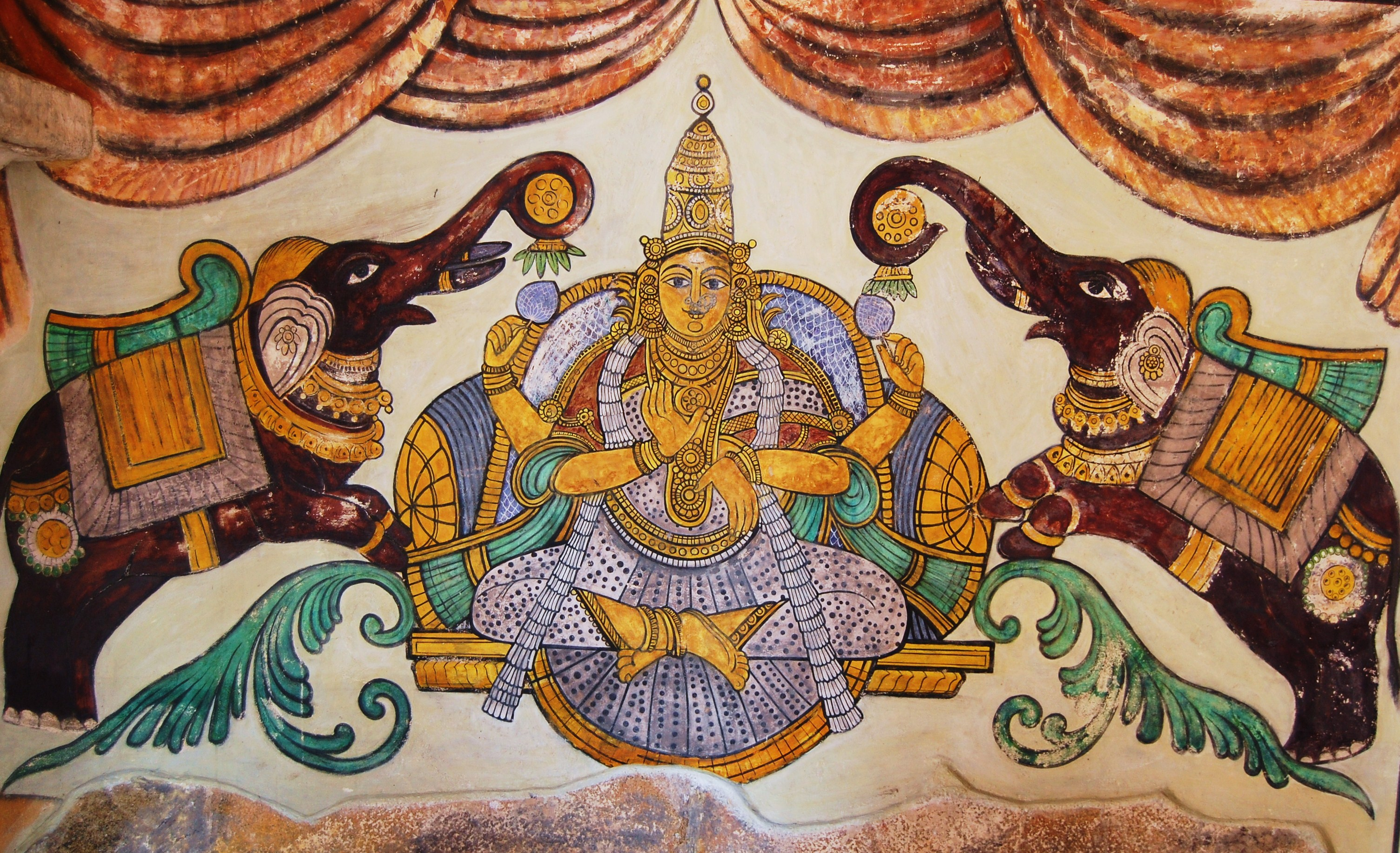
Tanjavur
Lakshmi's iconography is found in ancient and modern Hindu and Buddhist temples.

Lakshmi's name is derived from Sanskrit root words for knowing the goal and understanding the objective. Her four arms are symbolic of the four goals of humanity that are considered good in Hinduism: dharma (pursuit of ethical, moral life), artha (pursuit of wealth, means of life), kama (pursuit of love, emotional fulfillment), and moksha (pursuit of self-knowledge, liberation).

In Lakshmi's iconography, she is either sitting or standing on a lotus and typically carrying a lotus in one or two hands. The lotus symbolizes knowledge, self-realization, and liberation in the Vedic context, and represents reality, consciousness, and karma ('work, deed') in the Tantra (Sahasrara) context. The lotus, a flower that blooms in clean or dirty water, also symbolises purity regardless of the good or bad circumstances in which it grows. It is a reminder that good and prosperity can bloom and not be affected by evil in one's surroundings.

Below, behind, or on the sides, Lakshmi is very often shown with one or two elephants, known as Gajalakshmi, and occasionally with an owl. Elephants symbolise work, activity, and strength, as well as water, rain, and fertility for abundant prosperity. The owl signifies the patient striving to observe, see, and discover knowledge, particularly when surrounded by darkness. As a bird reputedly blinded by daylight, the owl also serves as a symbolic reminder to refrain from blindness and greed after knowledge and wealth have been acquired.

According to historian D. D. Kosambi, most of the Imperial Gupta kings were Vaishnavas and held the goddess Lakshmi in the highest esteem. Goddess Lakshmi is Simhavahini (mount as lion) on most of the coins during their rule. Coins during the rule of Prakashadiya, a Gupta ruler, contain the Garudadhvaja on the obverse and Lakshmi on the reverse.

The Gupta period sculpture only used to associate lions with Lakshmi, but was later attributed to Durga or a combined form of both goddesses. Lions were a 'vahana' of Lakshmi, Lions are also associated with Veera Lakshmi, who is one of the Ashtalakshmi. According to historian B. C. Bhattacharya, "An image of Gajalakshmi is found with two lions — one on either side of her. Two elephants are also shown near her head and by this we can say that Lion[sic] is also the vahana of Lakshmi along with Garuda".

In some representations, wealth either symbolically pours out from one of her hands or she simply holds a jar of money. This symbolism has a dual meaning: wealth manifested through Lakshmi means both material and spiritual wealth. Her face and open hands are in a mudra that signifies compassion, giving or dāna ('charity').

Lakshmi typically wears a red dress embroidered with golden threads, which symbolizes fortune and wealth. She, goddess of wealth and prosperity, is often represented with her husband Vishnu, the god who maintains human life filled with justice and peace. This symbolism implies wealth and prosperity are coupled with the maintenance of life, justice, and peace. When Lakshmi and Vishnu appear together in images and statues, she is significantly smaller, which is often used to portray her devotional status as a wife. A frequently depicted scene of the pair illustrates Lakshmi massaging Vishnu's feet.

Alternatively, Lakshmi Sahasranama of Skanda Purana, Lakshmi Tantra, and Markandeya Purana describe Lakshmi as having eighteen hands and is described as holding rosary, axe, mace, arrow, thunderbolt, lotus, pitcher, rod, sakti, sword, shield, conch, bell, wine-cup, trident, noose, and the discus in her eighteen hands, and as sitting on Garuda, a lion, or a tiger. According to the Lakshmi Tantra, the goddess Lakshmi, in her ultimate form of Mahasri, has four arms of a golden complexion, and holds a citron, a club, a shield, and a vessel containing amrita. In the Skanda Purana and the Venkatachala Mahatmayam, Sri, or Lakshmi, is praised as the mother of Brahma.

In Japan, where Lakshmi is known as Kisshōten, she is commonly depicted with the Nyoihōju gem (如意宝珠) in her hand.

Lakshmi is a member of the Tridevi, the triad of great goddesses. She represents the Rajas guna, and the Iccha-shakti.

== Historical development and attestations ==
=== Origin ===
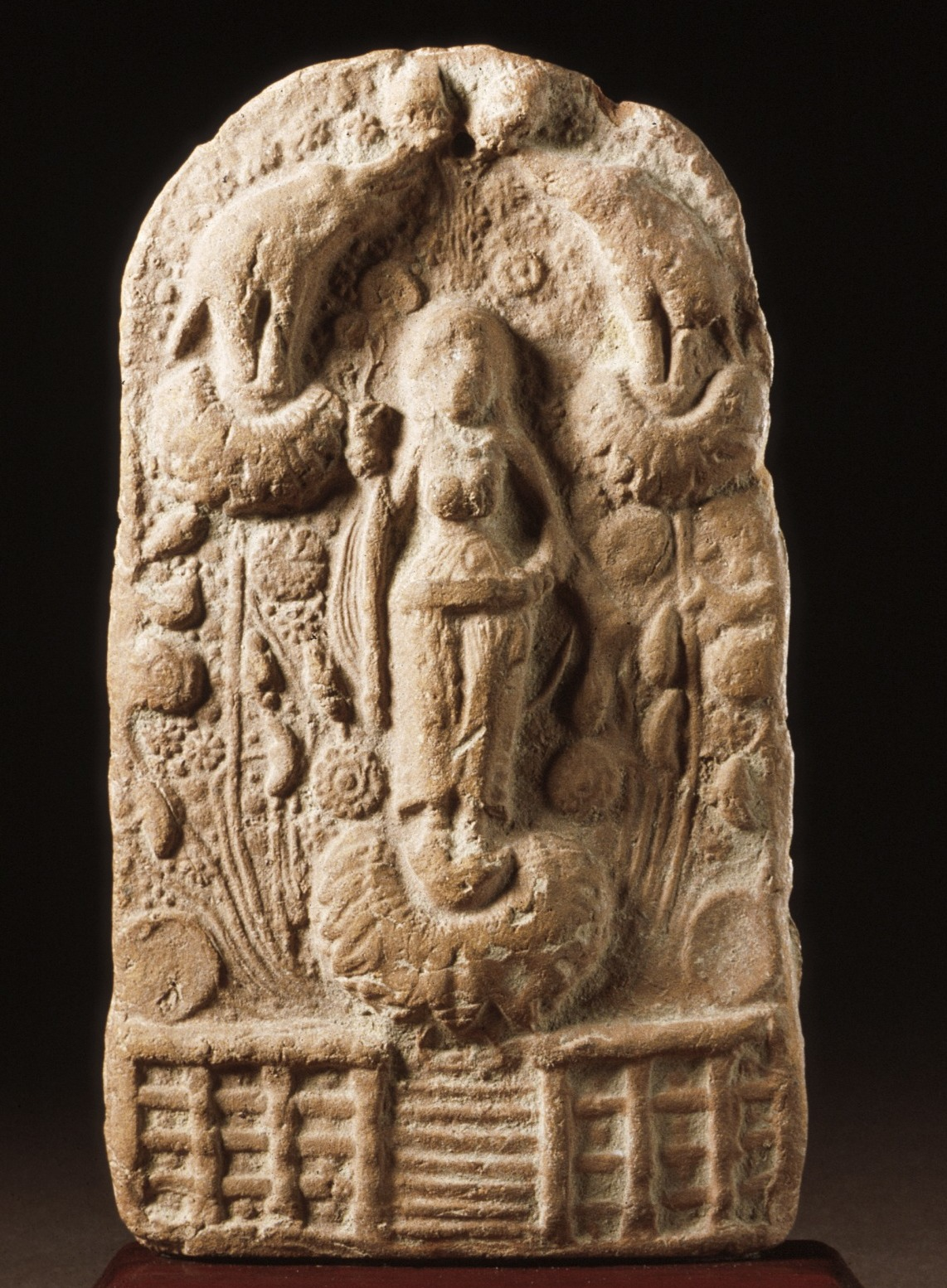
Lakshmi lustrated by elephants, Uttar Pradesh, Kausambi, 1st century BCE

The origins of Shri-Lakshmi can be traced to the earliest layers of Hindu sacred literature, particularly the Vedas. In the earliest texts, Shri or Lakshmi does not initially appear as a fully personified deity but as a collection of auspicious qualities and states such as radiance, beauty, abundance, power, and majesty. According to scholar Mandakranta Bose, this cluster of positive forces was gradually personified into a female divinity—a process consistent with a wider Indo-European pattern, in which ideals of well-being and sovereignty took the form of goddess figures. David Kinsley similarly notes that Lakshmi represents a type of royal goddess common to many Indo-European mythologies. Kinsley also notes that reverence of Shri-Lakshmi is particularly predates Buddhism, being featured in various stupa panels.

While Lakshmi is often associated with success and dominion, her most enduring role in early Hinduism was that of a provider. Scholar Sukumari Bhattacharji, draws attention to the linguistic parallel between the Sanskrit term "Śrī" and the Latin "Ceres," the Roman goddess of fertility and agriculture, suggesting a shared etymological origin. Bhattacharji proposes that this connection reflects a deeper Indo-European tradition of female divinities tied to agricultural prosperity and maternal nourishment. Bhattacharji also offers a numismatic insight, pointing to the Kushana-era image of a goddess labeled "Ommo," who holds both a lotus and a cornucopia—symbols of fertility and abundance. She suggests that this figure may be more accurately identified with Śrī than with the more commonly assumed Uma, thus representing an early visual form of the goddess Lakshmi as she later appears in Puranic iconography. The depiction reinforces the idea of Lakshmi’s agrarian character, a view supported by her consistent association with fertility and wealth in early sources.

=== Vedic texts ===
In Vedic literature—which includes the four Vedas, the Brahmanas, the Aranyakas, and the Upanishads—the name Shri appears frequently, while Lakshmi becomes more prominent only in later texts. The Rigveda (c. 1500 BCE) alone mentions Shri approximately 130 times, always in relation to prosperity, health, fortune, and radiance. In the Yajurveda’s various samhitas—Taittiriya, Kathaka, Maitrayani, and Vajasaneyi—Shri is mentioned thirteen times. While Shri and Lakshmi are considered to be identical in most of these attestations, a notable exception appears in the Vajasaneyi Samhita (31.22), which states “Śrīś ca te Lakṣmīś ca patnyau” (“Shri and Lakshmi are [his] two wives”), portraying them as distinct yet unified consorts of Vishnu, but without delineating any substantive difference between the two.

One of the earliest dedicated hymns to the fully-personified goddess is the Shri Sukta, found in the khila (appendix) of the fifth mandala of the Rigveda. Though not part of the main body of the Rigvedic text, the Shri Sukta is a significant early theological development, possibly pre-dating Buddhism. The hymn comprises fifteen verses: the first two and last three invoke Lakshmi, while the central verses (3–12) are addressed to Shri. The hymn portrays the goddess as golden-hued, richly adorned with gold and silver ornaments, seated on a chariot, and associated with elephants, horses, and especially the lotus. She is invoked as the bestower of wealth, fame, food, and material wellbeing. Importantly, she is also called upon to dispel her antithetical counterpart Alakshmi, who embodies misfortune, poverty, and hunger. The distinction between Lakshmi and Alakshmi becomes a recurring theme in later texts, reinforcing Lakshmi’s association with auspiciousness and plenitude.

In Atharva Veda, transcribed about 1000 BCE, Lakshmi evolves into a complex concept with plural manifestations. Book 7, Chapter 115 of Atharva Veda describes the plurality, asserting that a hundred Lakshmis are born with the body of a mortal at birth, some good, Punya ('virtuous') and auspicious, while others bad, paapi ('evil') and unfortunate. The good are welcomed, while the bad are urged to leave. The concept and spirit of Lakshmi and her association with fortune and the good is significant enough that Atharva Veda mentions it in multiple books: for example, in Book 12, Chapter 5 as Punya Lakshmi. In some chapters of Atharva Veda, Lakshmi connotes the good, an auspicious sign, good luck, good fortune, prosperity, success, and happiness.

Despite the extensive praise of Shri-Lakshmi’s qualities, the early Vedic texts offer relatively little regarding her mythological origin. A more developed narrative appears in the Shatapatha Brahmana, variously estimated to be composed between 800 BCE and 300 BCE, Sri (Lakshmi) is part of one of many theories, in ancient India, about the creation of the universe. In Book 9 of Shatapatha Brahmana, Shri emerges from Prajapati, after his intense meditation on the creation of life and nature of the universe. Shri is described as a resplendent and trembling woman at her birth with immense energy and powers. The gods are bewitched, desire her, and immediately become covetous of her. The gods approach Prajapati and request permission to kill her and then take her powers, talents, and gifts. Prajapati refuses, tells the gods that men should not kill women and that they can seek her gifts without violence. The gods then approach Lakshmi. Agni gets food, Soma gets kingly authority, Varuna gets imperial authority, Mitra acquires martial energy, Indra gets force, Brihaspati gets priestly authority, Savitri acquires dominion, Pushan gets splendour, Saraswati takes nourishment and Tvashtri gets forms. However, her presence is conditional and merit-based—she allies only with those worthy of her gifts. As a result, she moves among various divine and semi-divine figures, including Soma, Dharma, Indra, and even virtuous demons such as Bali and Prahlada. This portrayal of her shifting allegiance gives rise to the notion of her as an inconstant force, attaching herself to virtue and desert rather than personal loyalty. Ultimately, Shri settles as the steadfast consort of Vishnu, establishing the lasting association that defines Lakshmi in later devotional and mythological traditions.

=== Epics ===
In the epics of Hinduism, such as in Mahabharata, Lakshmi personifies wealth, riches, happiness, loveliness, grace, charm, and splendor. In another Hindu legend about the creation of the universe as described in Ramayana, Lakshmi springs with other precious things from the foam of the ocean of milk when it is churned by the gods and demons for the recovery of Amṛta. She appeared with a lotus in her hand and so she is also called Padmā. Some scholars propose a theory that Sri and Lakshmi may have originally been different goddesses, who merged into one figure.

Sita, the female protagonist of the Ramayana and her husband, the god-king Rama are considered as avatars of Lakshmi and Vishnu, respectively.

In the Mahabharata, Draupadi is described as an incarnation of Sri (Lakshmi). A later interpolation attempts to reinterpret Draupadi as Shachi, associating Lakshmi instead with Rukmini, the consort of Krishna, who is an incarnation of Vishnu. However, scholars affirm that the original tradition identifies Sri with Draupadi, as evidenced in the Critical Edition.

=== Upanishads ===
Shakta Upanishads are dedicated to the Tridevi of goddesses—Lakshmi, Saraswati and Parvati. Saubhagyalakshmi Upanishad describes the qualities, characteristics, and powers of Lakshmi. In the second part of the Upanishad, the emphasis shifts to the use of yoga and transcendence from material craving to achieve spiritual knowledge and self-realization, the true wealth. Saubhagya-Lakshmi Upanishad synonymously uses Sri to describe Lakshmi.

=== Stotram and sutras ===
Numerous ancient Stotram and Sutras of Hinduism recite hymns dedicated to Lakshmi. She is a major goddess in Puranas and Itihasa of Hinduism. In ancient scriptures of India, all women are declared to be embodiments of Lakshmi. For example:

Every woman is an embodiment of you.
You exist as little girls in their childhood,
As young women in their youth
And as elderly women in their old age.

— Sri Kamala Stotram

Every woman is an emanation of you.

— Sri Daivakrta Laksmi Stotram

Ancient prayers dedicated to Lakshmi seek both material and spiritual wealth in prayers.

Through illusion,
A person can become disconnected,
From his higher self,
Wandering about from place to place,
Bereft of clear thought,
Lost in destructive behavior.
It matters not how much truth,
May shine forth in the world,
Illuminating the entire creation,
For one cannot acquire wisdom,
Unless it is experienced,
Through the opening on the heart....

=== Puranas ===
Lakshmi is described prominently in Puranas of Hinduism. Vishnu Purana, in particular, dedicates many sections to her and also refers to her as Sri. J. A. B. van Buitenen translates passages describing Lakshmi in Vishnu Purana:

Sri, loyal to Vishnu, is the mother of the world. Vishnu is the meaning, Sri is the speech. She is the conduct, he the behavior. Vishnu is knowledge, she the insight. He is dharma, she the virtuous action. She is the earth, the earth's upholder. She is contentment, he the satisfaction. She wishes, he is the desire. Sri is the sky, Vishnu the Self of everything. He is the Sun, she the light of the Sun. He is the ocean, she is the shore.

=== Subhasita, genomic and didactic literature ===
Lakshmi, along with Parvati and Saraswati, is a subject of extensive Subhashita, genomic and didactic literature of India. Composed in the 1st millennium BCE through the 16th century CE, they are short poems, proverbs, couplets, or aphorisms in Sanskrit written in a precise meter. They sometimes take the form of a dialogue between Lakshmi and Vishnu or highlight the spiritual message in Vedas and ethical maxims from Hindu Epics through Lakshmi. An example Subhashita is Puranartha Samgraha, compiled by Vekataraya in South India, where Lakshmi and Vishnu discuss niti ('right, moral conduct') and rajaniti ('statesmanship' or 'right governance')—covering in 30 chapters and ethical and moral questions about personal, social and political life.

== Manifestations and aspects ==
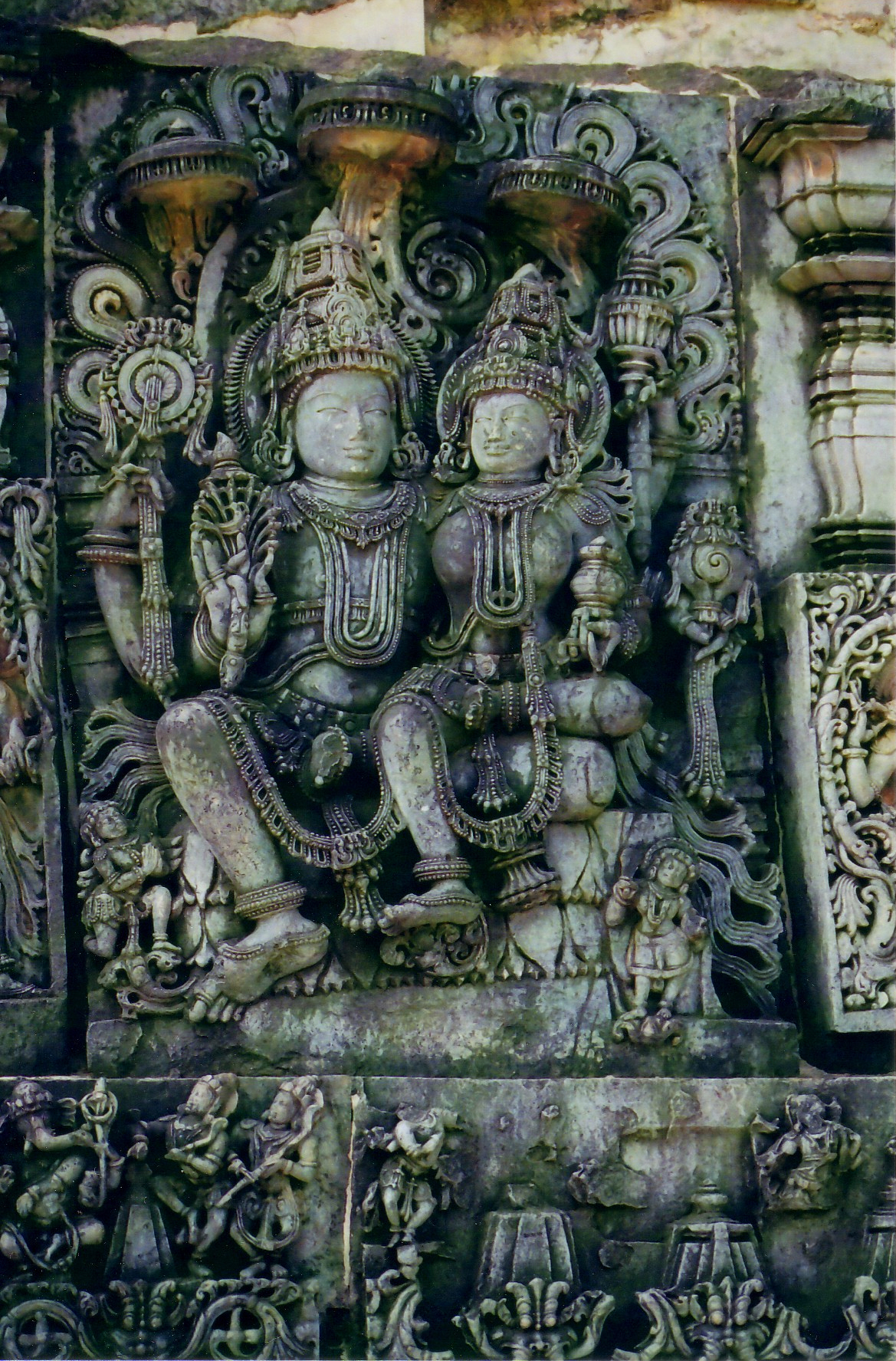
Sculpture of Lord Vishnu and Goddess Lakshmi at Hoysaleswara Temple at Halebidu

Inside temples, Lakshmi is often shown together with Vishnu. In certain parts of India, Lakshmi plays a special role as the mediator between her husband Vishnu and his worldly devotees. When asking Vishnu for grace or forgiveness, the devotees often approach him through the intermediary presence of Lakshmi. She is also the personification of spiritual fulfillment. Lakshmi embodies the spiritual world, also known as Vaikuntha, the abode of Lakshmi and Vishnu (collectively called Lakshmi Narayana). Lakshmi is the embodiment of the creative energy of Vishnu, and primordial Prakriti who creates the universe.

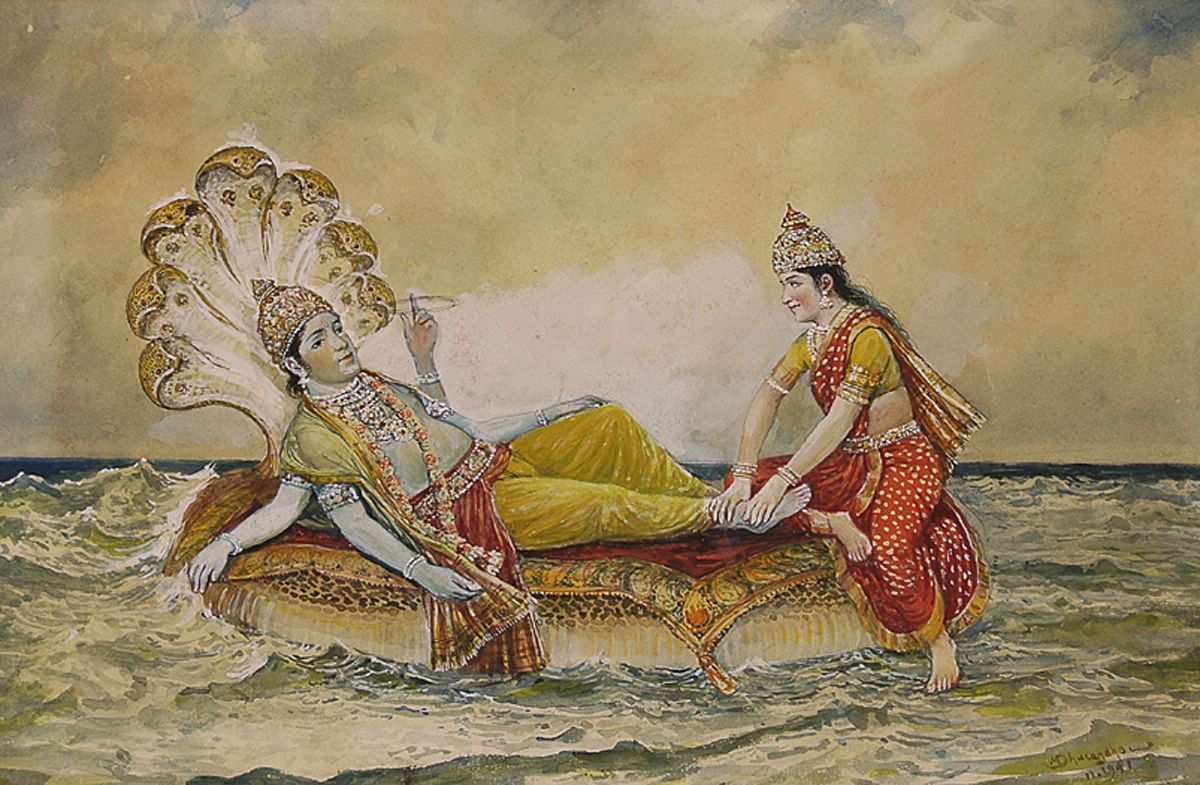
An early 20th-century painting depicting Vishnu resting on Ananta-Shesha, with Lakshmi massaging his feet.

According to Garuda Purana, Lakshmi is considered as Prakriti (Mahalakshmi) and is identified with three forms — Sri, Bhu and Durga. The three forms consist of Satva ('goodness'), rajas, and tamas ('darkness') gunas, and assists Vishnu (Purusha) in creation, preservation and destruction of the entire universe. Durga's form represents the power to fight, conquer and punish the demons and anti-gods.

In the Lakshmi Tantra and Lakshmi Sahasranama of Skanda Purana, Lakshmi is given the status of the primordial goddess. According to these texts, Durga and the other forms, such as Mahalakshmi, Mahakali and Mahasaraswati and all the Shaktis that came out of all gods such as Matrikas and Mahavidya, are all various forms of Goddess Lakshmi. In Lakshmi Tantra, Lakshmi tells Indra that she got the name Durga after killing an asura named Durgama. Indologists and authors Chitralekha Singh and Prem Nath says, "Narada Purana describes the powerful forms of Lakshmi as Durga, Mahakali, Bhadrakali, Chandi, Maheshwari, Mahalakshmi, Vaishnavi and Andreye".

Lakshmi, Saraswati, and Parvati are typically conceptualized as distinct in most of India, but in states such as West Bengal and Odisha, they are regionally believed to be forms of Durga. In Hindu Bengali culture, Lakshmi, along with Saraswati, are seen as the daughters of Durga. They are worshipped during Durga Puja.

In South India, Lakshmi is seen in two forms, Sridevi and Bhudevi, both at the sides of Venkateshwara, a form of Vishnu. Bhudevi represents the material world or energy, called the Apara Prakriti, or Mother Earth, while Sridevi is the spiritual world or energy called the Prakriti. According to Lakshmi Tantra, Nila Devi, another manifestation or incarnation of Lakshmi, is the third consort of Vishnu. Each goddess of this triad—Sridevi, Bhudevi, and Nila Devi—is mentioned in the Śrī Sūkta, Bhu Sūkta, and Nila Sūkta, respectively. This threefold goddess can be found, for example, in Sri Bhu Neela Sahita Temple near Dwaraka Tirumala, Andhra Pradesh, and in Adinath Swami Temple in Tamil Nadu. In many parts of the region, Andal is considered as an incarnation of Lakshmi. Ashta Lakshmi (Sanskrit: अष्टलक्ष्मी, Aṣṭalakṣmī, 'eight Lakshmis') is a group of eight secondary manifestations of Lakshmi. The Ashta Lakshmi presides over eight sources of wealth and thus represents the eight powers of Shri Lakshmi. Temples dedicated to Ashta Lakshmi are found in Tamil Nadu, such as Ashtalakshmi Kovil near Chennai and many other states of India.

Ashta Lakshmi
Adi Lakshmi	The First manifestation of Lakshmi
Dhanya Lakshmi	Granary Wealth
Veera Lakshmi	Wealth of Courage
Gaja Lakshmi	Elephants spraying water, the wealth of fertility, rains, and food.
Santana Lakshmi	Wealth of Continuity, Progeny
Vidya Lakshmi	Wealth of Knowledge and Wisdom
Vijaya Lakshmi	Wealth of Victory
Dhana / Aishwarya Lakshmi	Wealth of prosperity and fortune

== Creation and legends ==
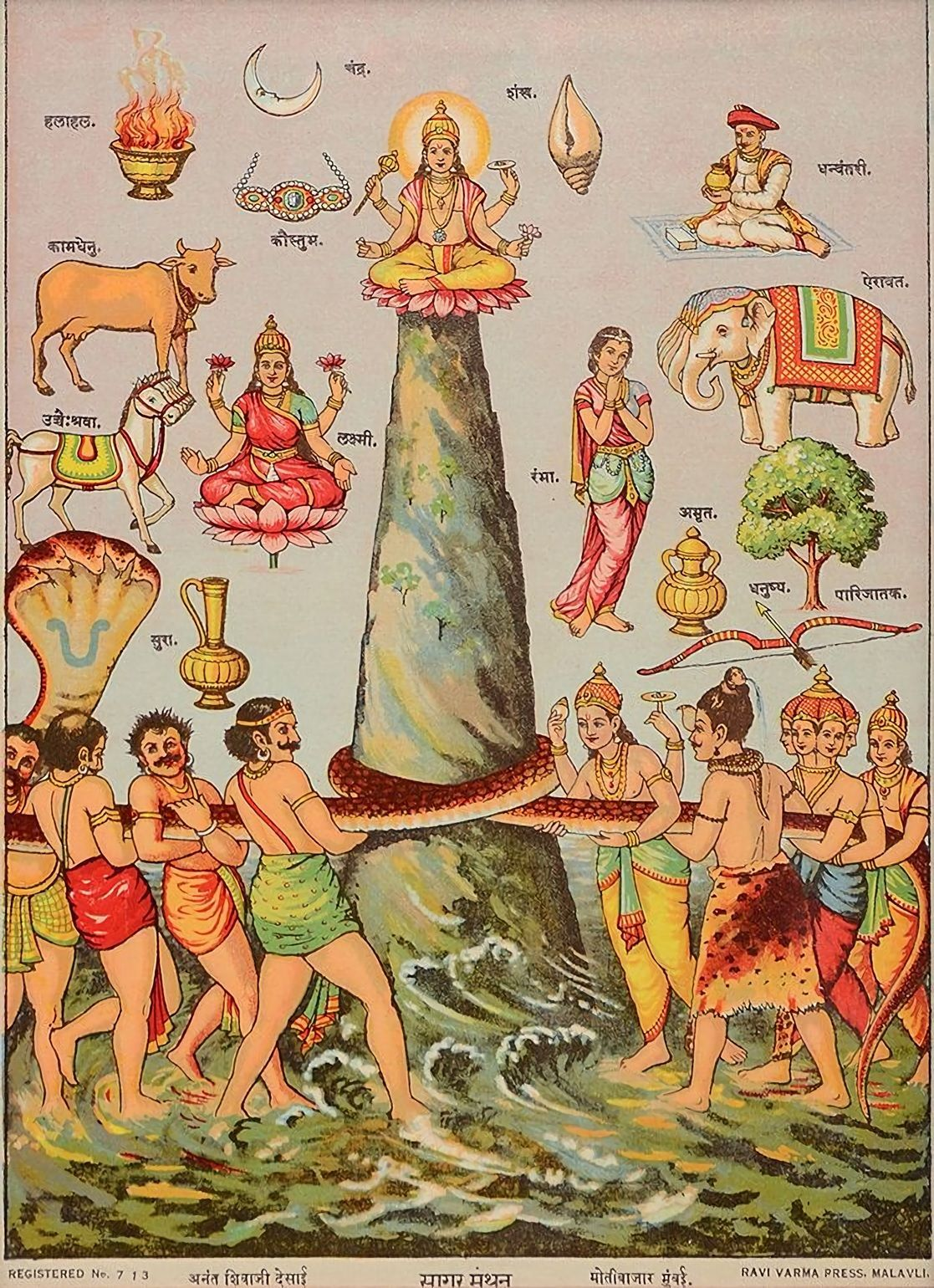
A painting depicting Samudra Manthana, with Lakshmi emerging with the lotus in her hands.

Devas (gods) and asuras (demons) were both mortal at one time in Hinduism. Amrita, the divine nectar that grants immortality, could only be obtained by churning Kshira Sagara ('Ocean of Milk'). The devas and asuras both sought immortality and decided to churn the Kshira Sagara with Mount Mandhara. The Samudra Manthana commenced with the devas on one side and the asuras on the other. Vishnu incarnated as Kurma, the tortoise, and a mountain was placed on the tortoise as a churning pole. Vasuki, the great venom-spewing serpent-god, was wrapped around the mountain and used to churn the ocean. A host of divine celestial objects came up during the churning. Along with them emerged the goddess Lakshmi. In some versions, she is said to be the daughter of the sea god since she emerged from the sea.

According to Vishnu Purana, Garuda Purana, Linga Purana and Padma Purana, Lakshmi is said to have been originally born as the daughter of the divine sage Bhrigu and his wife Khyati and was named Shri. Only later she came out of the ocean when the gods and demons churned the Kshirsagar, bearing a lotus. Along with the divine cow Kamadhenu, Varuni, the Parijat tree, the Apsaras, Chandra (the moon), and Dhanvantari with Amrita ('nectar of immortality'). When she appeared, she had a choice to go to the Devas or the Asuras. She chose the Devas' side and among thirty deities, she chose to be with Vishnu. Thereafter, in all three worlds, the lotus-bearing goddess was celebrated.

According to another legend, she emerges during the creation of universe, floating over the water on the expanded petals of a lotus flower; she is also variously regarded as wife of Dharma, sister or mother of Dhātṛ and Vidhātṛ, wife of Dattatreya.

In the Skanda Purana, the sage Agastya praises her as "the sole mother of Madana" (Kamadeva), while worshipping Kolhapur Mahalakshmi. John Dowson likewise describes Lakshmi as the wife of Vishnu and the mother of Kama. A separate tradition in the Tripura Rahasya, a Shakta tantric text, also contains an account of the birth of Kama from Lakshmi.

She is also described as one of the nine Shaktis of Viṣṇu, a manifestation of Prakṛti as identified with Dākshāyaṇī in Bharatasrama and with Sita, wife of Rama.

== Worship and festivals ==
=== Festivals ===
Many Hindus worship Lakshmi on Deepavali (Diwali), the festival of lights. It is celebrated in autumn, typically October or November every year. The festival spiritually signifies the victory of light over darkness, knowledge over ignorance, good over evil and hope over despair.

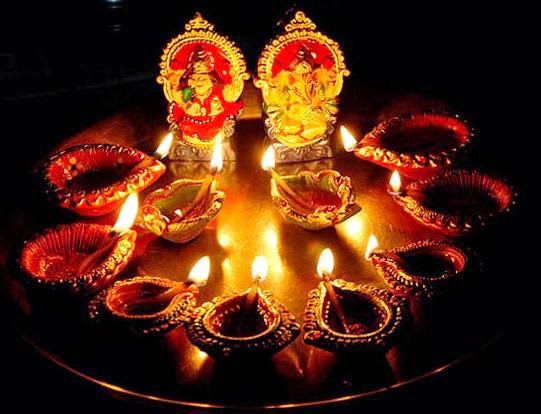
Deepavali celebrations include puja (prayers) to Lakshmi and Ganesha. Lakshmi is of the Vaishnavism tradition, while Ganesha of the Shaivism tradition of Hinduism.

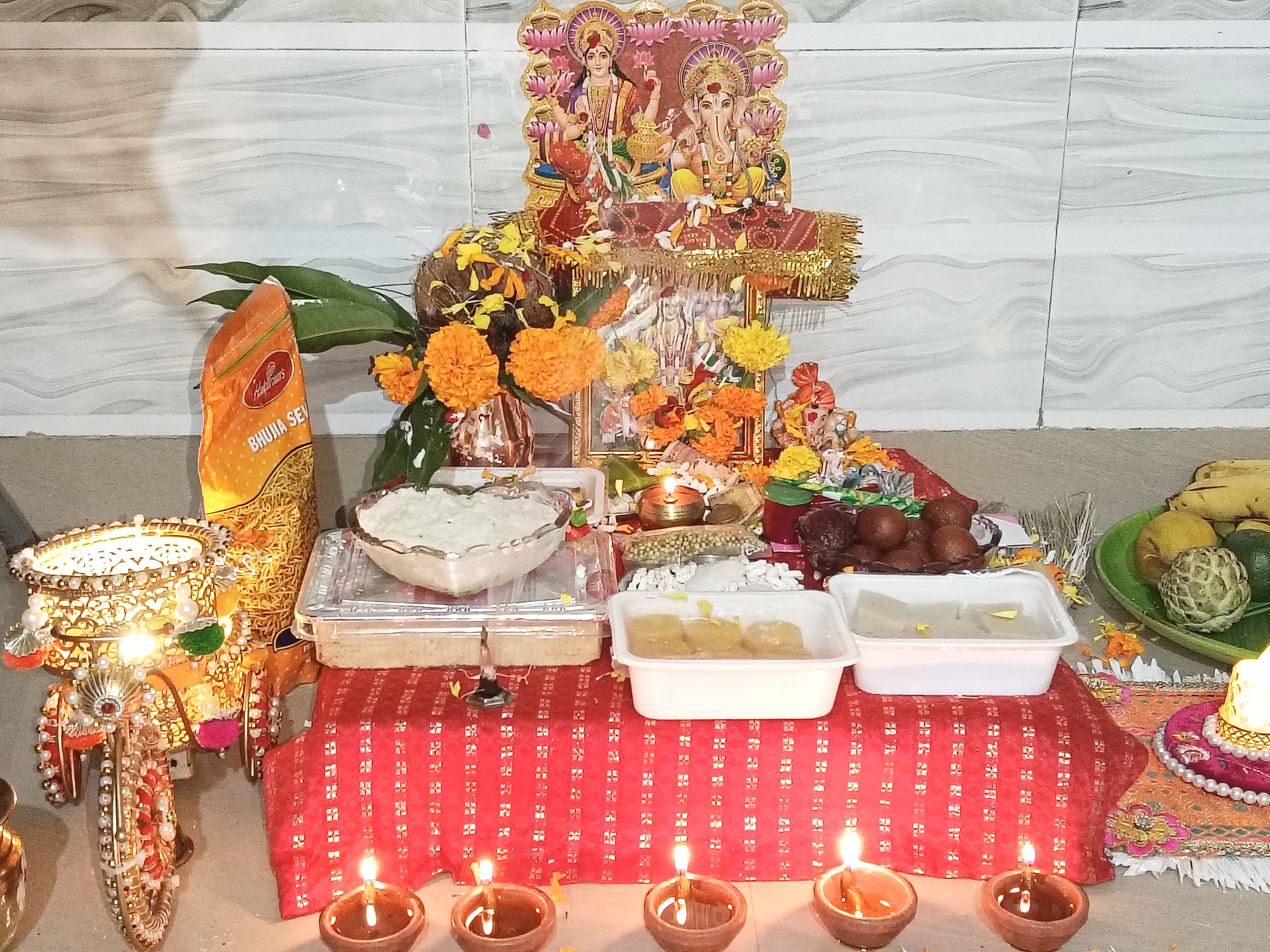
View of Lakshmi Puja's seat on Diwali at Maithils house

On the night of Deepavali, Hindus light up diyas (lamps and candles) inside and outside their home, and participate in family puja (prayers) typically to Lakshmi. Deepavali also marks a major shopping period, since Lakshmi connotes auspiciousness, wealth and prosperity.

A very sacred day for the worship of Goddess Lakshmi falls on Chaitra Shukla Panchami, also called, Lakshmi Panchami, Shri Panchami, Kalpadi and Shri Vrata. As this worship is in the first week of the Hindu new year, by Hindu calendar, it is considered very auspicious. Varalakshmi Vratam is celebrated by married Hindu women to pray for the well-being of their husbands.

Gaja Lakshmi Puja is another autumn festival celebrated on Sharad Purnima in many parts of India on the full-moon day in the month of Ashvin (October). Sharad Purnima, also called Kojaagari Purnima or Kuanr Purnima, is a harvest festival marking the end of monsoon season. There is a traditional celebration of the moon called the Kaumudi celebration, Kaumudi meaning moonlight. On Sharad Purnima night, goddess Lakshmi is thanked and worshipped for the harvests. Vaibhav Lakshmi Vrata is observed on Friday for prosperity.

=== Hymns ===
Numerous hymns, prayers, shlokas, stotra, songs, and legends dedicated to Lakshmi are recited during the ritual worship of the goddess. These include:

- Sri Mahalakshmi Ashtakam (by Indra)
- Sri Lakshmi Sahasaranama Stotra (by Sanat Kumara)
- Sri Stuti (by Vedanta Desika)
- Lakshmi Stuti (by Indra)
- Kanakadhara Stotram (by Adi Shankara)
- Chatuh Shloki (by Yamunacharya)
- Sri Lakshmi Sloka (by Bhagavan Hari Swamiji)
- Sri Sukta, which is contained in the Vedas and includes the Lakshmi Gayatri Mantra (Om Sri Mahalakshmyai ca vidmahe Vishnu patnyai ca dhimahi tanno Lakshmi prachodayat, Om)
- Lakshmi Gayatri mantra mentioned in the Linga Purana (48.13) - (Samudratayai vidmahe Vishnunaikena dhimahi tanno Radha prachodayat)
- Ashtalakshmi Stotram (by U.V. Srinivasa Varadachariyar)

== Major Temples ==
Some temples dedicated to Goddess Lakshmi are:

- 108 Divya Desams
- Agroha Dham
- Ashtalakshmi Temple, Chennai
- Azhagiya Manavala Perumal Temple
- Bhagyalakshmi Temple, Hyderabad
- Chottanikkara Temple, Kerala
- Dadhimati Mata Temple
- Golden Temple, Sripuram
- Goravanahalli Mahalakshmi Temple
- Harshat Mata Temple
- Jarai-ka-Math
- Kaila Devi Temple, Rajasthan
- Lakshmi Devi Temple, Doddagaddavalli
- Lakshminarayana Temple, Hosaholalu
- Lakshmi Temple, Khajuraho
- Laxminarayan Temple, Delhi
- Mahalakshmi Kollapuradamma Temple, Ratnagiri
- Mahalakshmi Temple, Dahanu
- Mahalakshmi Temple, Kolhapur
- Mahalakshmi Temple, Kallur
- Mahalakshmi Temple, Mumbai
- Mookambika Temple, Kollur
- Pancha Bhargavi Kshethram
- Pundarikakshan Perumal Temple
- Padmakshi Temple
- Padmavathi Temple, Tamil Nadu
- Sri Kanaka Maha Lakshmi Temple, Andhra Pradesh
- Sri Lakshmi Chandrala Parameshwari Temple, Karnataka
- Shri Sulebhavi Mahalakshmi Temple
- Sri Lakshmi Temple, Ashland, Massachusetts
- Thirunarayur Nambi Temple
- Vaishno Devi Temple

== Archaeology ==
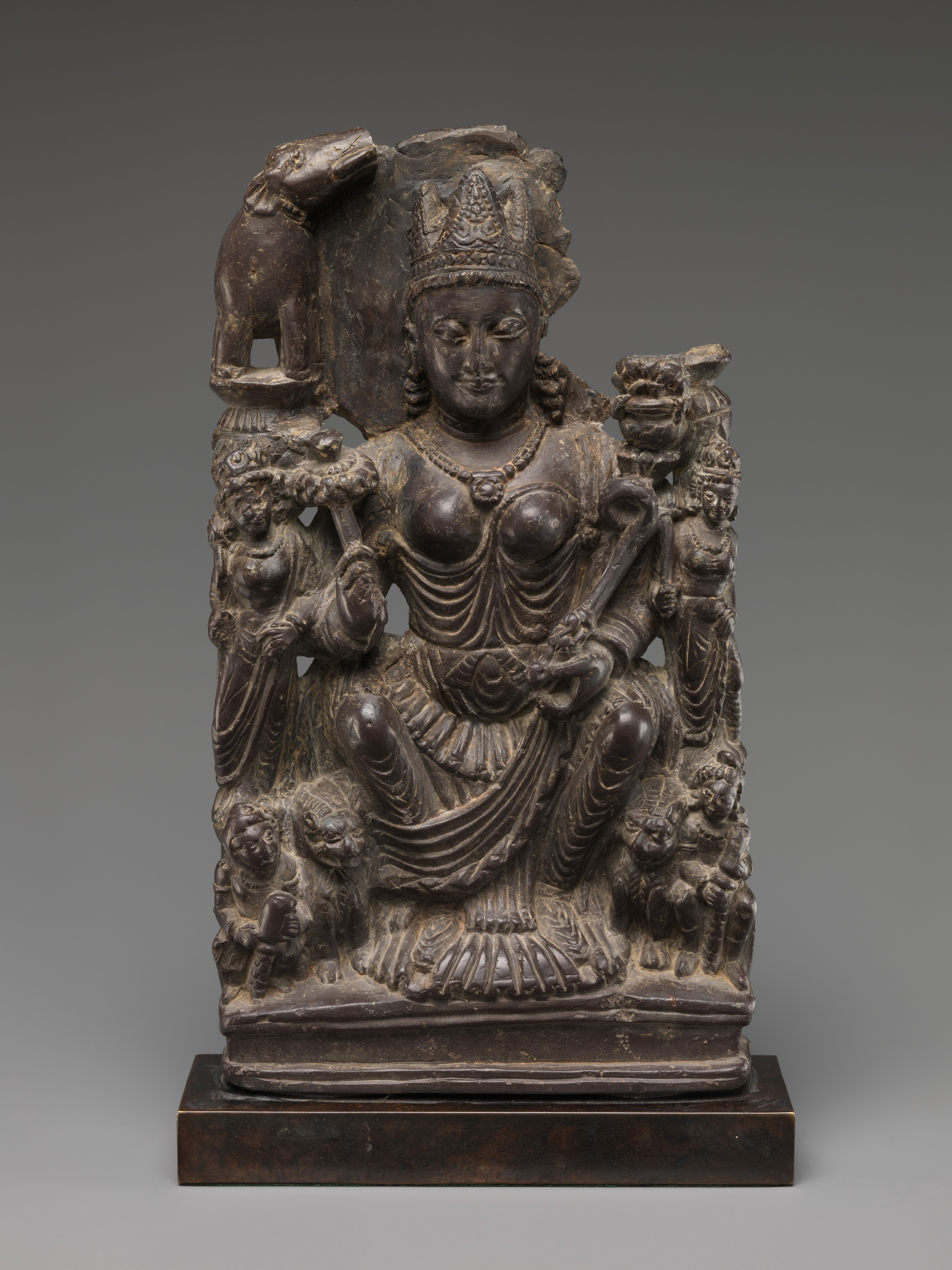
Greek-influenced statue of Gaja Lakshmi, holding lotus and cornucopia, flanked by two elephants and two lions. From Kashmir, 6th century CE.

A representation of the goddess as Gaja Lakshmi or Lakshmi flanked by two elephants spraying her with water, is one of the most frequently found in archaeological sites. An ancient sculpture of Gaja Lakshmi (from Sonkh site at Mathura) dates to the pre-Kushan Empire era. Atranjikhera site in modern Uttar Pradesh has yielded terracotta plaque with images of Lakshmi dating to the 2nd century BCE. Other archaeological sites with ancient Lakshmi terracotta figurines from the 3rd century BCE include Vaisali, Sravasti, Kausambi, Campa, and Candraketugadh.

The goddess Lakshmi is frequently found in ancient coins of various Hindu kingdoms from Afghanistan to India. Gaja Lakshmi has been found on coins of Scytho-Parthian kings Azes II and Azilises; she also appears on Shunga Empire king Jyesthamitra era coins, both dating to 1st millennium BCE. Coins from 1st through 4th century CE found in various locations in India such as Ayodhya, Mathura, Ujjain, Sanchi, Bodh Gaya, Kanauj, all feature Lakshmi. Similarly, ancient Greco-Indian gems and seals with images of Lakshmi have been found, estimated to be from 1st-millennium BCE.

A 1400-year-old rare granite sculpture of Lakshmi has been recovered at the Waghama village along Jehlum in Anantnag district of Jammu and Kashmir.

The Pompeii Lakshmi, a statuette supposedly thought to be of Lakshmi found in Pompeii, Italy, dates to before the eruption of Vesuvius in 79 CE.

== Outside Hinduism ==
=== Jainism ===
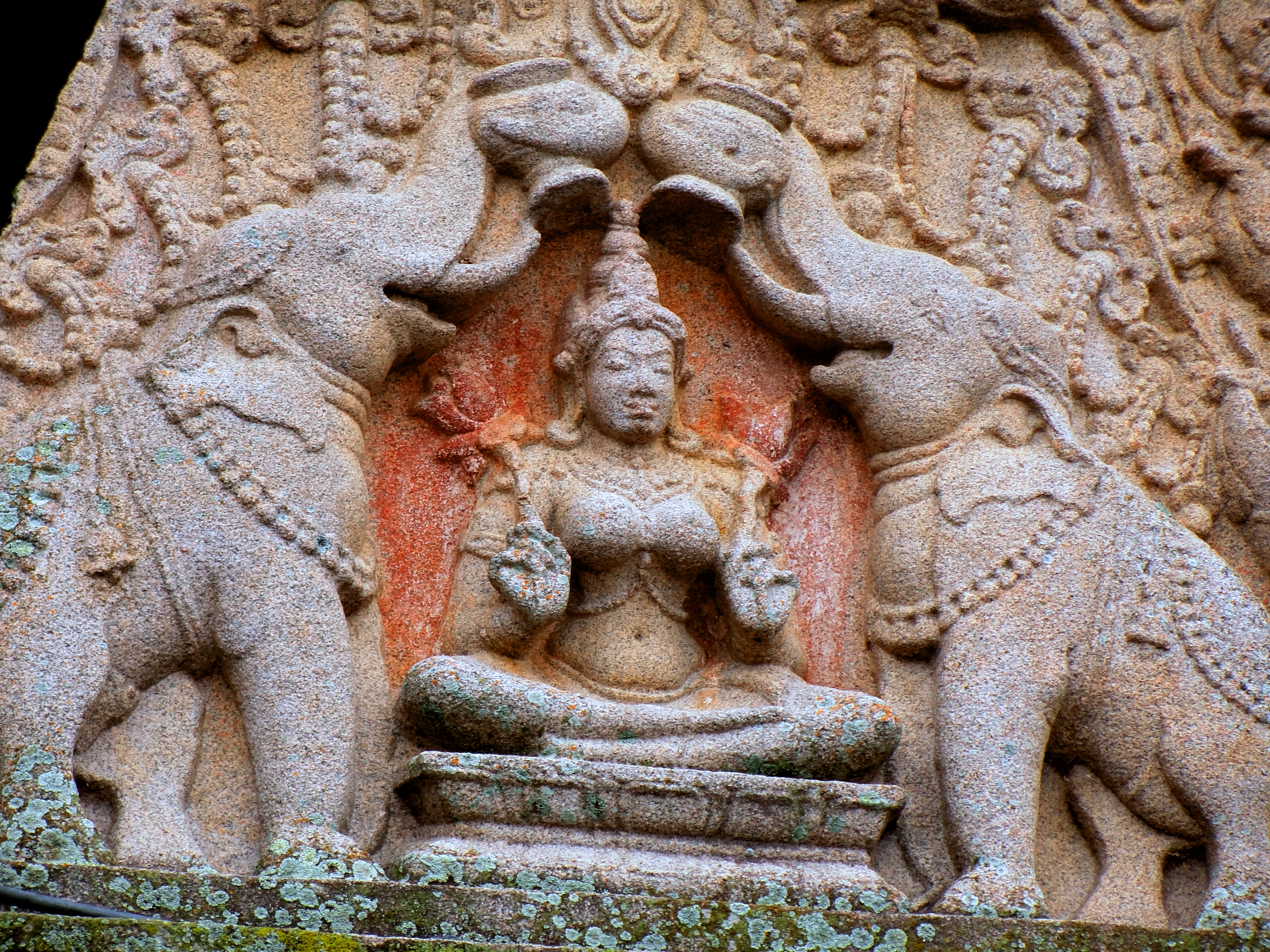
Gaja Lakshmi at Shravanabelagola Temple, Karnataka.

Lakshmi is also an important deity in Jainism and found in Jain temples. Some Jain temples also depict Sri Lakshmi as a goddess of artha ('wealth') and kama ('pleasure'). For example, she is exhibited with Vishnu in Parshvanatha Jain Temple at the Khajuraho Monuments of Madhya Pradesh, where she is shown pressed against Vishnu's chest, while Vishnu cups a breast in his palm. The presence of Vishnu-Lakshmi iconography in a Jain temple built near the Hindu temples of Khajuraho, suggests the sharing and acceptance of Lakshmi across a spectrum of Indian religions. This commonality is reflected in the praise of Lakshmi found in the Jain text Kalpa Sūtra.

=== Buddhism ===
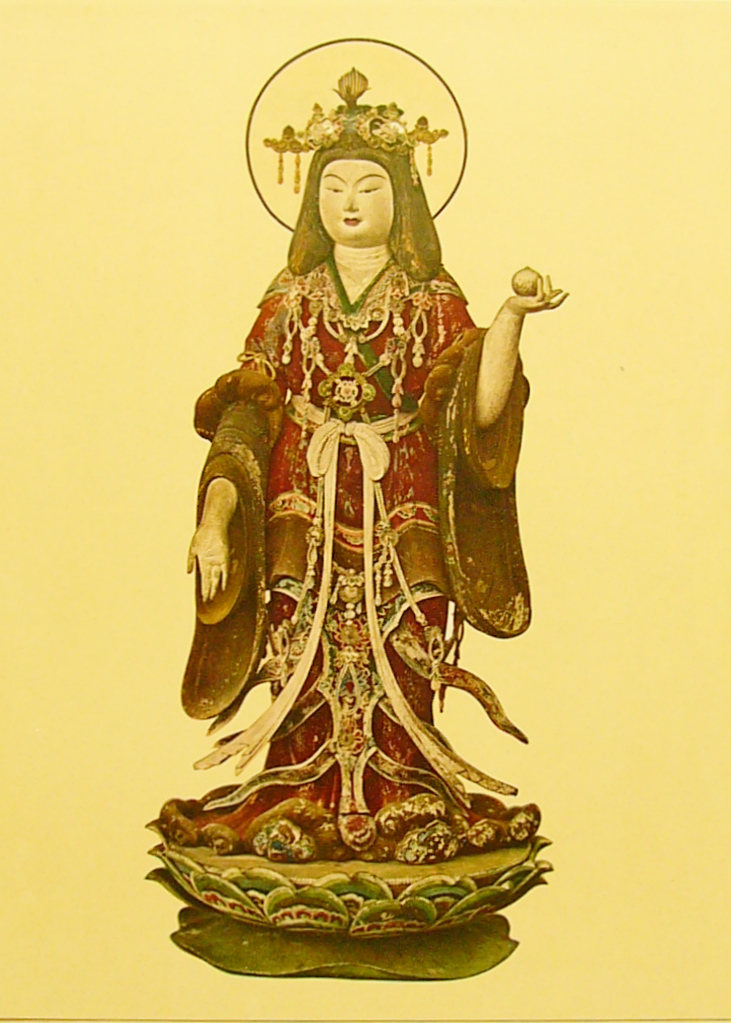
The Japanese Kishijoten is adapted from Lakshmi.

In Buddhism, Lakshmi has been viewed as a goddess of abundance and fortune, and is represented on the oldest surviving stupas and cave temples of Buddhism. In Buddhist sects of Tibet, Nepal, and Southeast Asia, Vasudhara mirrors the characteristics and attributes of the Hindu Goddess, with minor iconographic differences.

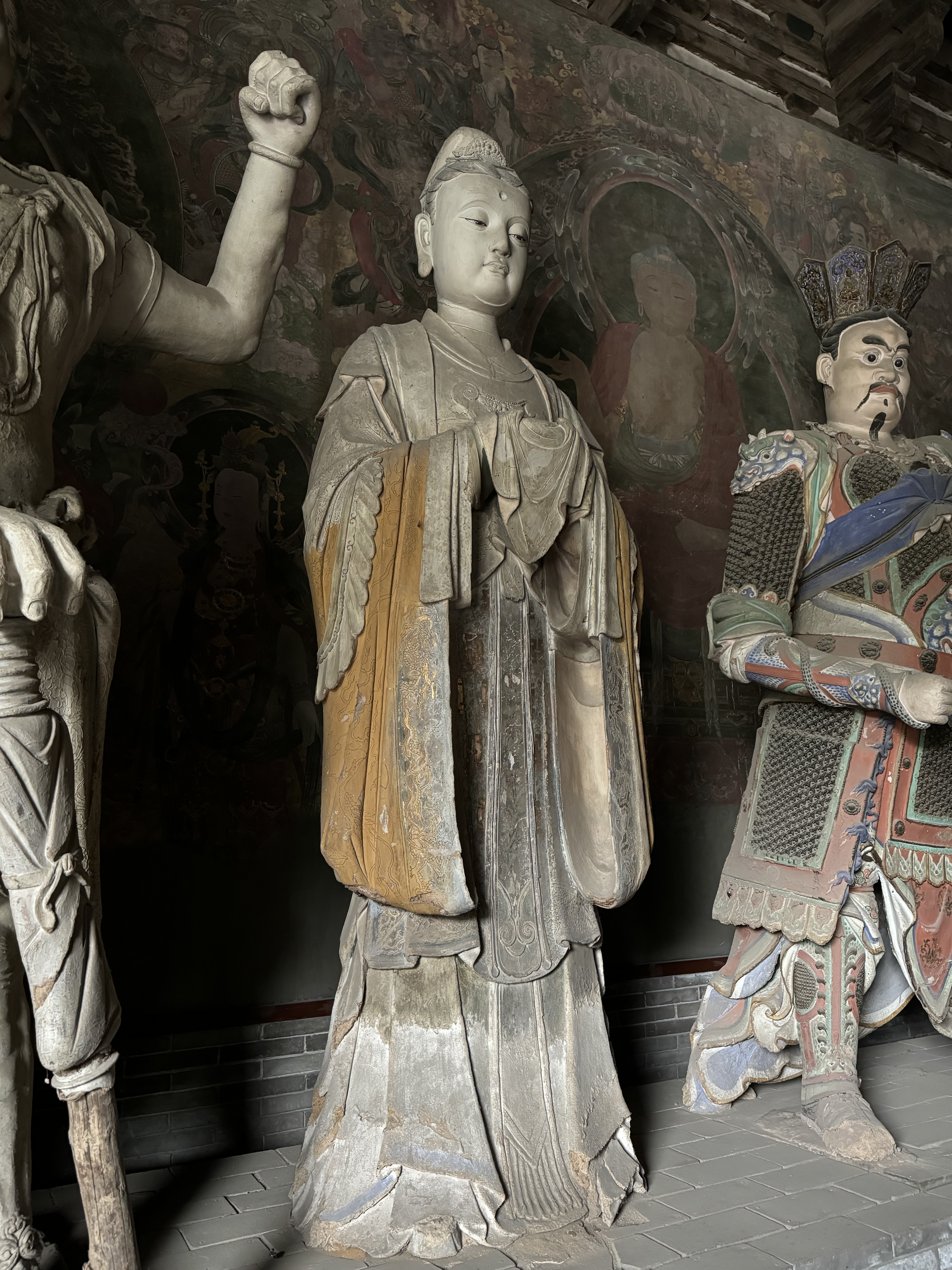
Ming dynasty (1368-1644) statue of Jixiang Tiannü, who is Lakshmi as known in Chinese Buddhism, at Shanhua Temple in Datong, China

In Chinese Buddhism, Lakshmi is referred to as either Gōngdétiān (功德天, lit "Meritorious god" ) or Jíxiáng Tiānnǚ (吉祥天女, lit "Auspicious goddess") and is the goddess of fortune and prosperity. She is regarded as the sister of Píshāméntiān (毗沙門天), or Vaiśravaṇa, one of the Four Heavenly Kings. She is also regarded as one of the twenty-four protective deities, and her image is frequently enshrined in the Mahavira Hall of most Chinese Buddhist monasteries together with the other deities. Her mantra, the Sri Devi Dharani (Chinese: 大吉祥天女咒; pinyin: Dà Jíxiáng Tiānnǚ Zhòu) is classified as one of the Ten Small Mantras (Chinese: 十小咒; pinyin: Shí xiǎo zhòu), which are a collection of dharanis that are commonly recited in Chinese Buddhist temples during morning liturgical services.

The Dharani is as follows:

Namo buddhāya, Namo dharmāya, Namaḥ samghāya, Namaḥ Śrī Mahādevīye. Tadyathā, Oṃ paripūraṇa cāre samanta darśane. Mahā vihāra gate samanta vidhamane. Mahā kārya pratiṣṭhāpane, sarvārtha sādhane, supratipūri ayatna dharmatā. Mahā vikurvite, mahā maitrī upasamhite, mahārṣi susamgṛhīte samantārtha anupālane svāhā.

In Japanese Buddhism, Lakshmi is known as Kishijoten (吉祥天, 'Auspicious Heavens') and is also the goddess of fortune and prosperity. Like in China, Kishijoten is considered the sister of Bishamon (毘沙門, also known as Tamon or Bishamon-ten), who protects human life, fights evil, and brings good fortune. In ancient and medieval Japan, Kishijoten was the goddess worshiped for luck and prosperity, particularly on behalf of children. Kishijoten was also the guardian goddess of Geishas.

In Tibetan Buddhism, Lakshmi is an important deity, especially in the Gelug School. She has both peaceful and wrathful forms; the latter form is known as Palden Lhamo, Shri Devi Dudsol Dokam, or Kamadhatvishvari, and is the principal female protector of (Gelug) Tibetan Buddhism and of Lhasa, Tibet.

While Lakshmi and Vaiśravaṇa are found in ancient Chinese and Japanese Buddhist literature, their roots have been traced to deities in Hinduism.

Lakshmi is closely linked to Dewi Sri, who is worshipped in Bali as the goddess of fertility and agriculture.

== Incarnations ==
Throughout various texts and scriptures, Lakshmi incarnated as the following:

- Vedavati – Vedavati is the possessor of the Vedas and is also considered the previous birth of goddess Sita.
- Bhumi – Bhumi is the goddess of the Earth and the consort of Vishnu's 3rd avatar Varaha. She is regarded as the mother of Narakasura, Mangala and Sita.
- Varahi – Varahi is the female energy and consort of Varaha. She is the commander of the Matrikas.
- Pratyangira – Pratyangira is the consort of Narasimha and the pure manifestation of the wrath of Tripurasundari.
- Namagiri Thayar – Namagiri Thayar is the consort of Narasimha, 4th avatar of Vishnu.
- Dharani – Dharani is the wife of sage Parashurama, the 6th avatar of Vishnu.
- Sita – Sita is the female protagonist of the Hindu epic Ramayana and the consort of Rama, Vishnu's 7th avatar. She is the chief goddess of the Rama-centric Hindu traditions and is the goddess of beauty, devotion and ploughshare.
- Radha – Radha is the goddess of love, tenderness, compassion and devotion. She is the eternal and chief consort of Krishna and she is also the personification of Mūlaprakriti, who is the feminine counterpart and internal potency (hladini shakti) of Krishna, Vishnu's 8th avatar.
- Rukmini – Rukmini is the first and supreme queen of Krishna. She is the goddess of fortune and the queen of Dvaraka.
- Jambavati – Jambavati is the second queen of Krishna.
- Satyabhama – Satyabhama is the third queen of Krishna and personification of goddess Bhumi.
- Kalindi – Kalindi is the fourth queen of Krishna and is worshipped as river goddess Yamuna.
- Nagnajiti – Nagnajiti is the fifth queen of Krishna and the personification of Niladevi.
- Mitravinda – Mitravinda is the sixth queen of Krishna.
- Lakshmana – Lakshmana is the seventh queen of Krishna.
- Bhadra – Bhadra is the eighth queen of Krishna (varies) .
- Madri – according to Harivamsa Madri is the eighth queen of Krishna.
- Gopis – Gopis are considered as the consorts and devotees of Krishna, and expansion of goddess Radha, among all the Gopi devotees of Radha Krishna, Lalita is the most prominent.
- Junior wives of Krishna – They were several thousand women, Krishna married after rescuing them from the demon Narakasura, Rohini was considered the chief queen of them all.
- Revati – Revati is the goddess of Opulence and the wife of Balrama, who is considered as Vishnu's avatar in some traditions.
- Vatikā – Vatikā is the wife of sage Vyasa, who is considered as a partial incarnation of Vishnu.
- Padmavati – Padmavati is the consort of Venkateswara, an avatar of Vishnu. She is the goddess of Tirupati.
- Bhargavi – Bhargavi is the daughter of sage Bhrigu and his wife Khyati.
- Vaishno Devi – Vaishnavi is seen as the potency of Vishnu and is worshipped as a combined avatar of Mahakali, Mahalakshmi and Mahasarasvati. She is widely worshipped as an immortal, ascetic, and vegetarian virgin goddess who possesses the powers of Lord Vishnu, Her future consort of Kalki.
- Ranganayaki – Ranganayaki is the chief consort of Ranganatha, an avatar of Vishnu. She is the goddess of Srirangam.
- Andal – Andal is the consort of Ranganatha and the personification of Bhumi. She is the only female Alvar.
- Archi – Archi is the consort of Prithu, an avatar of Vishnu.

== Gallery ==
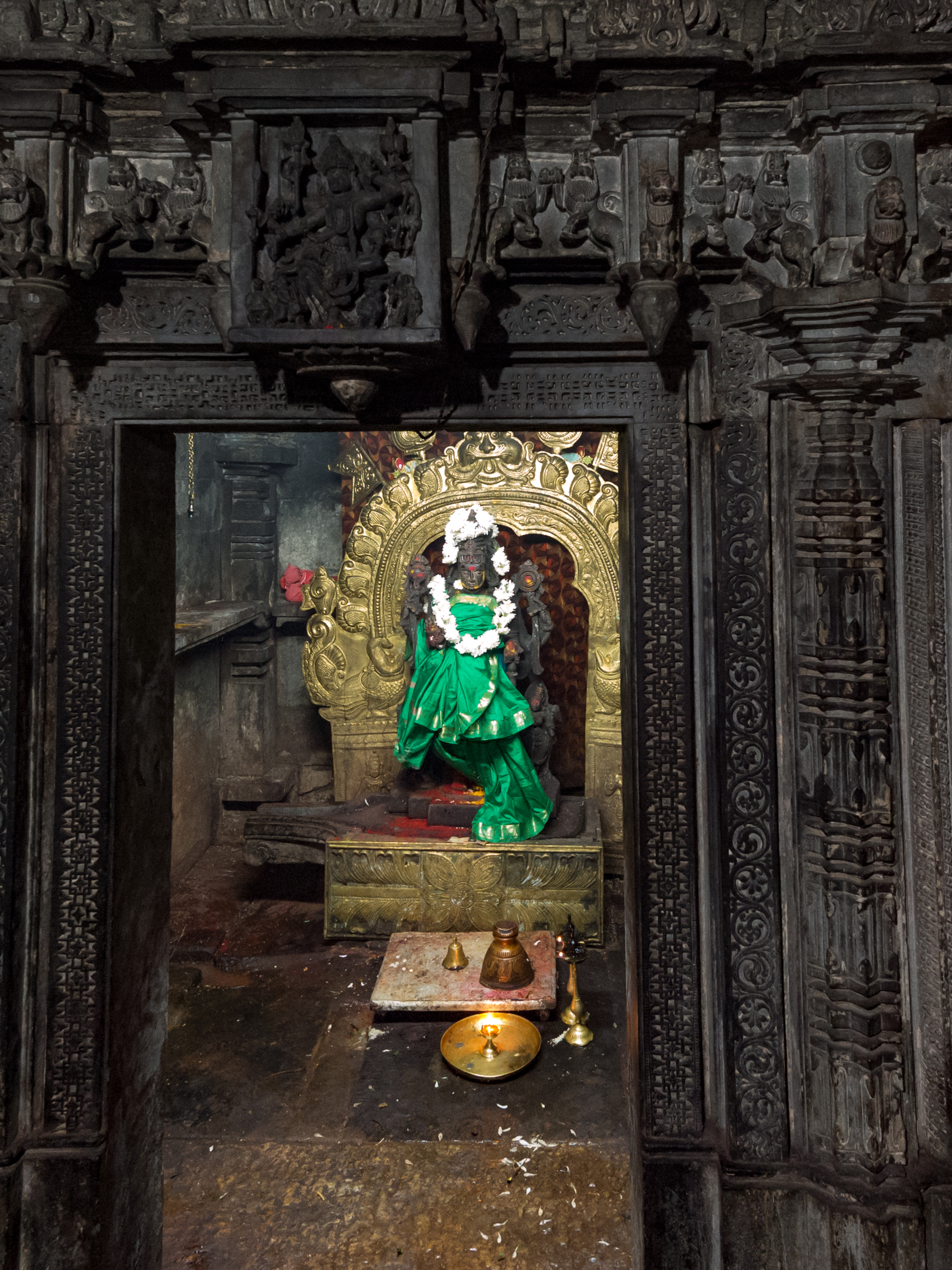
Lakshmi Devi idol in Sanctum of temple at Doddagaddavalli, in Hassan District, Karnataka India.

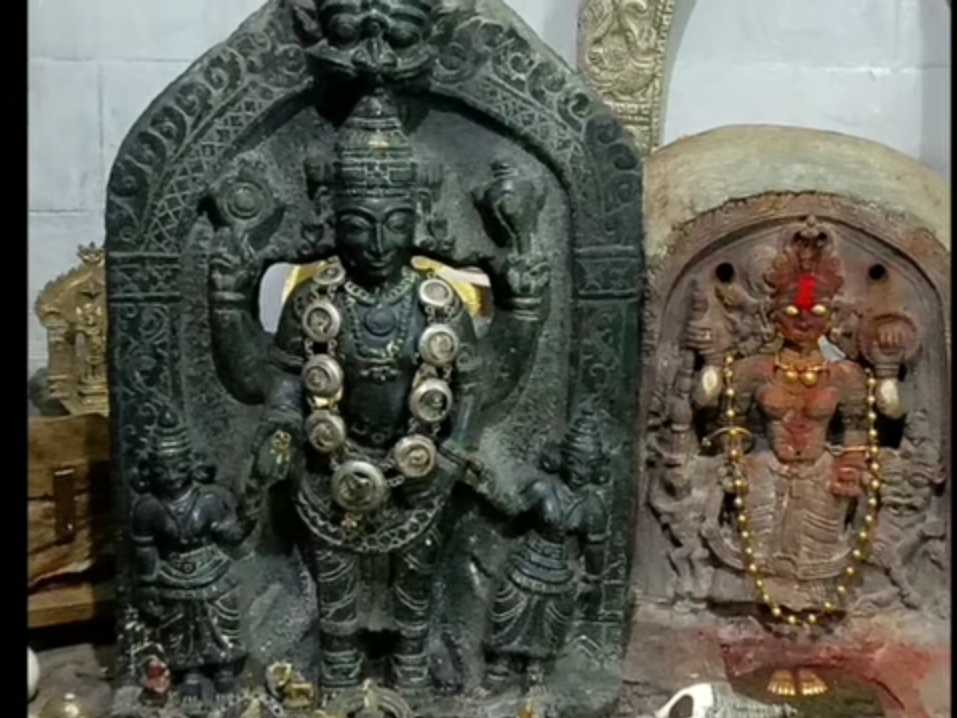
Self emerged idol of goddess Lakshmi with Srinivasa in Kallur Mahalakshmi temple [Second Kolhapur

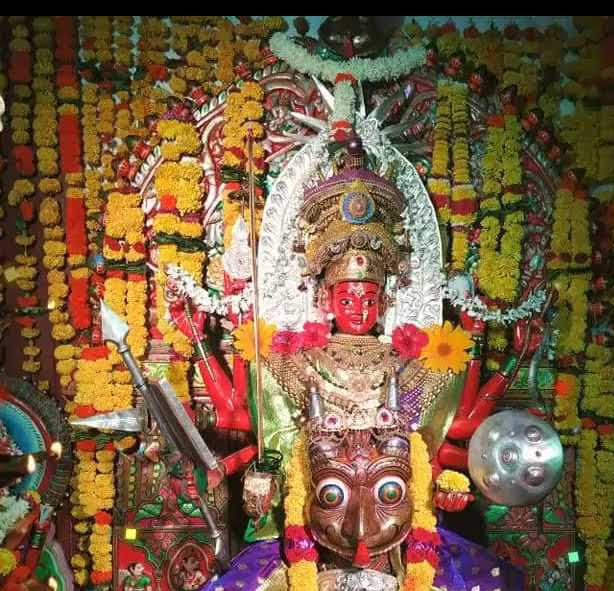
Mahalaxmi temple Sulebhavi., Local form of goddess lakshmi

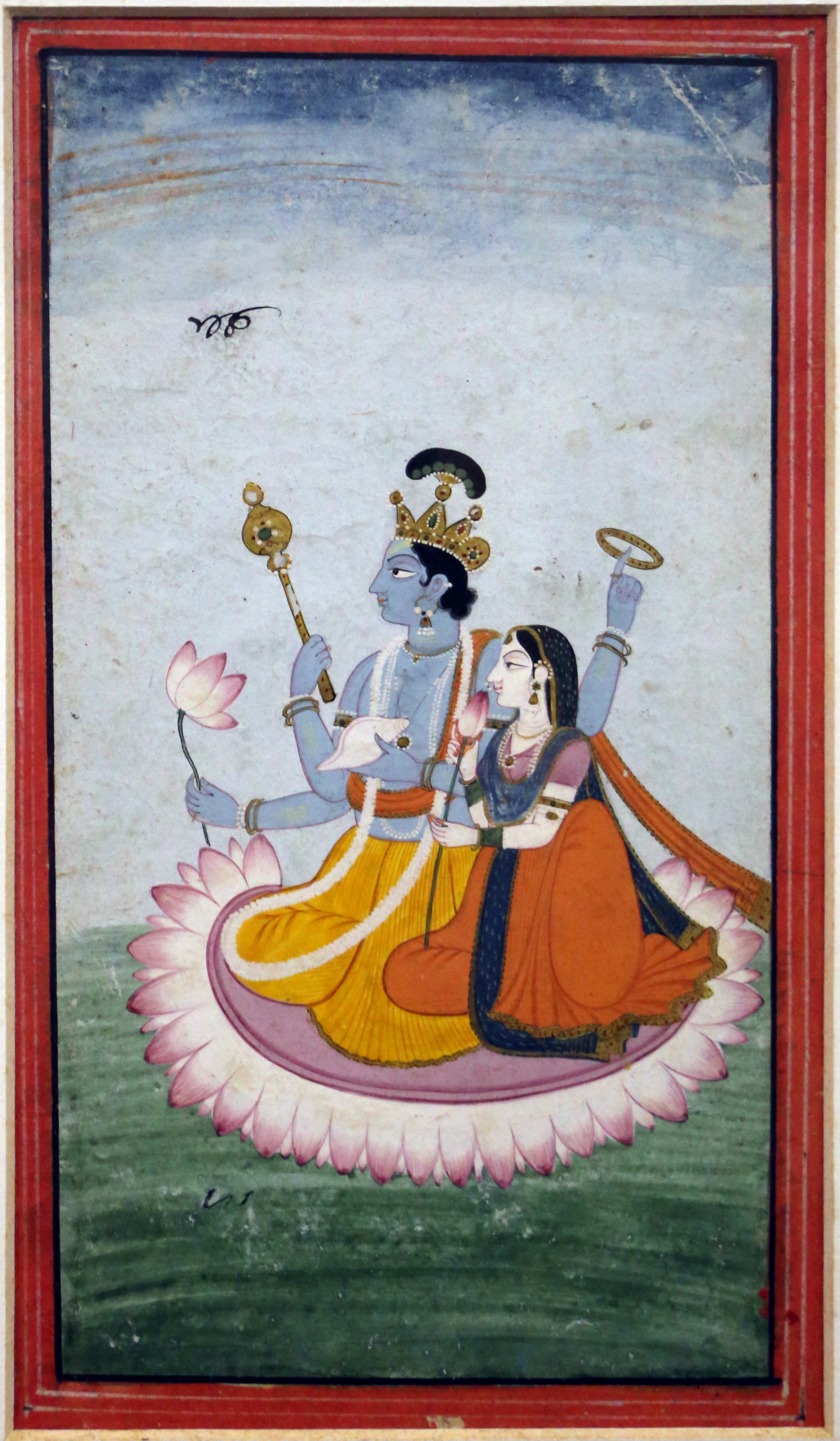
Miniature painting of Vishnu and Lakshmi

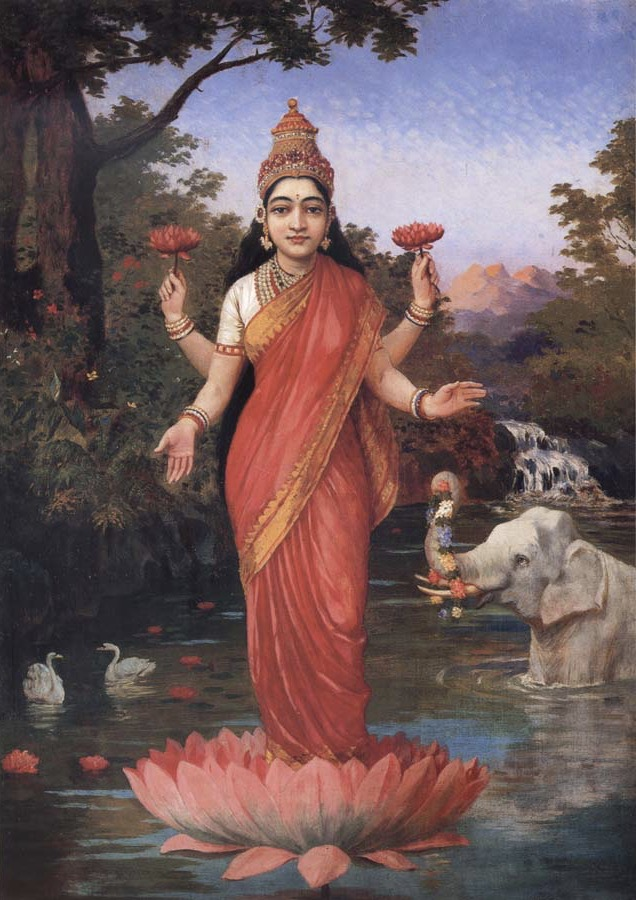
Oil on canvas by Raja Ravi Varma

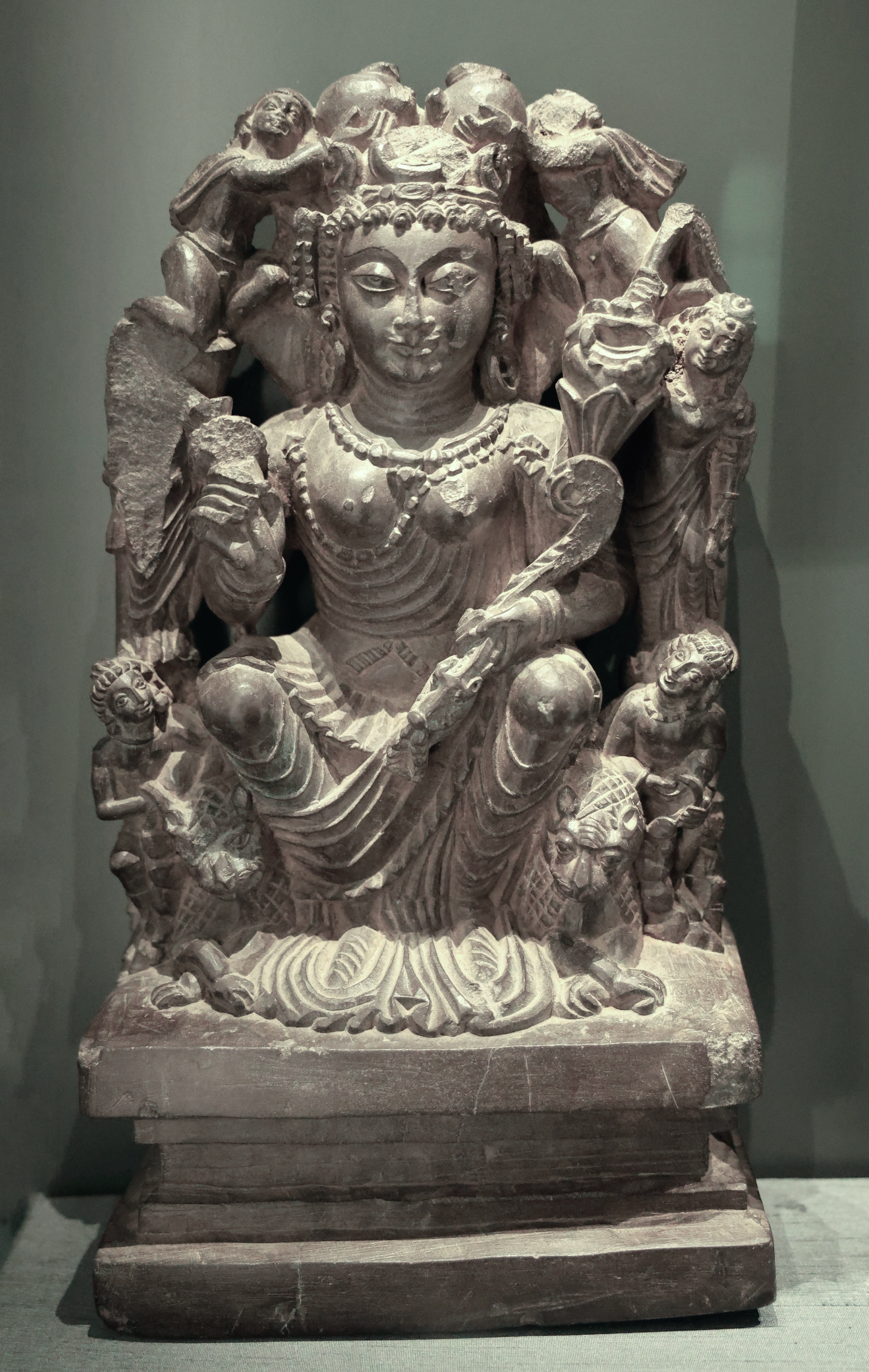
6th Century Kashmir sculpture

Lakshmi Shrine at Gaysorn Village, Bangkok, Thailand

Phra Lakshmi Emblem of Princess Lakshamilavan of Thailand

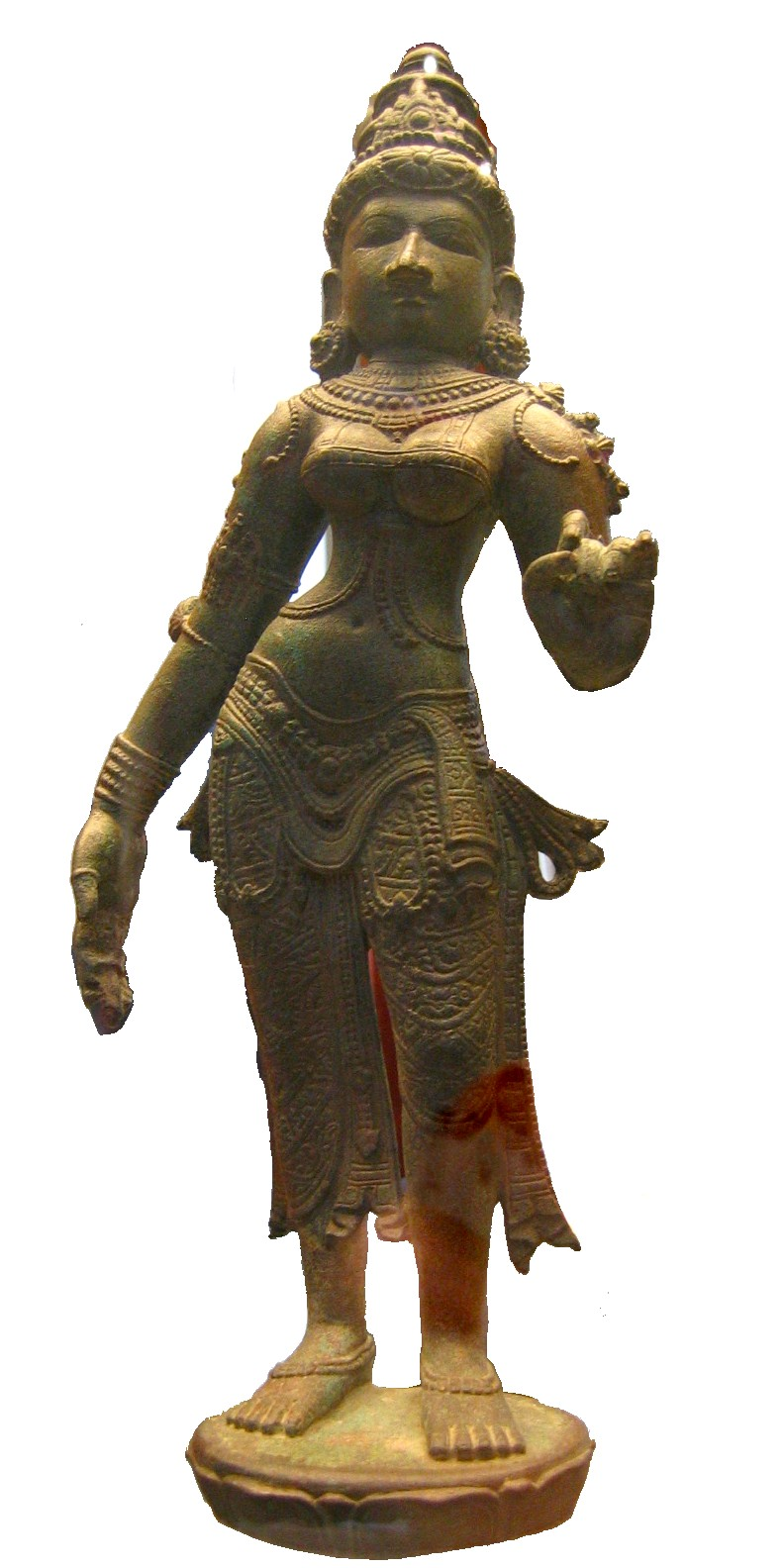
A sculpture of the goddess Lakshmi at British Museum

== See also ==
- Deepalakshmi
- Doddagaddavalli
- Star of Lakshmi
- Śrī Sūkta – Rigvedic hymns dedicated to Lakshmi
- Lakshmi Planum – Planum on Venus
