= Jarai-ka-Math =

Hindu Temple in Uttar Pradesh, India

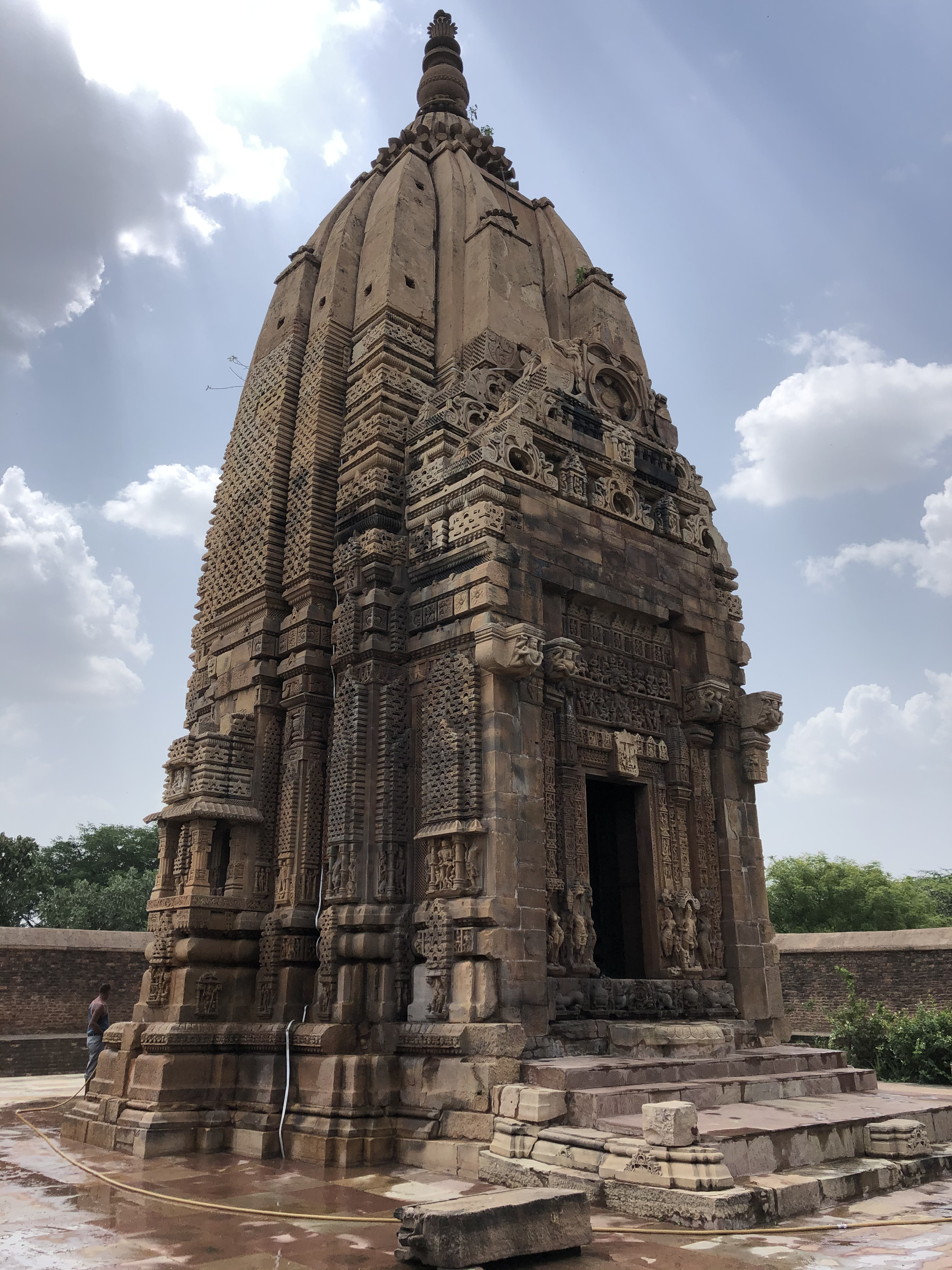
Jarai-ka-Math

Jarai-ka-Math is a temple dedicated to Goddess Laxmi in Barua sagar near Jhansi in Uttar Pradesh, India.

== History ==
Jarai-ka-Math was built by the Gurjara-Pratihara ruler Mihira Bhoja. The temple dates backs to approximately 860 AD, this red sandstone temple is a pancharata shrine of the Panchayatan type, in which the main temple is surrounded by four subsidiary shrines at the four corners. Declared a protected monument by the Archaeological Survey of India in 1928, the temple is an excellent example of early Gurjara-Pratihara architecture.

== About ==
The temple is a repercussion to the vigorous temple-building activity which became a characteristic feature of the Chandellas. The temple is dedicated to Devi (Laxmi) whose multifarious forms are represented in the profusely carved sculptures along the temple walls. The temple stands on elevated ground dominating its surroundings. The main image of the deity is missing from the sanctum sanctorum. Only the pedestal, and the jeweled right foot of a female placed on a lotus stalk, remains. This detail is traditionally associated with the goddess Tara or Mateswari. The placement of a miniature, sixteen-armed image of a goddess on the central lintel of the entrance further supports the conjecture that the temple is dedicated to a goddess. Erotic sculptures, akin to those at Khajuraho, also grace the Jarai-ka-Math.
