= Thirunarayur Nambi Temple =

Perumal temple in Thanjavur district, Tamil Nadu, India

Nachiyar Kovil
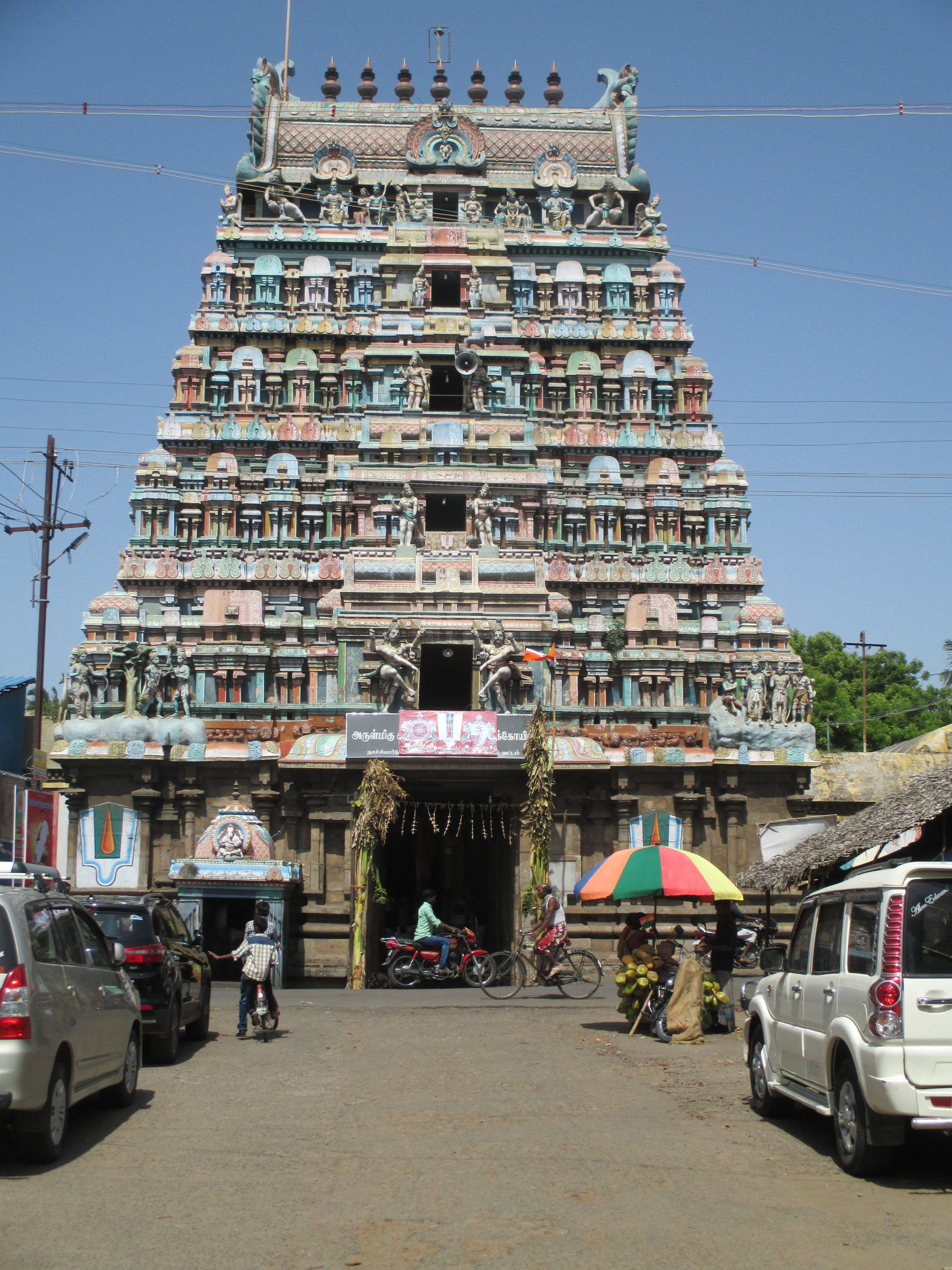

- Srinivasa Perumal Temple, Natchiarkoil, Thanjavur, Tamil Nadu

Religion
- Affiliation: Hinduism
- District: Thanjavur
- Deity: Vanchulavalli Nachiyar (Lakshmi in the form of Niladevi); Naraiyur Nambi Perumal (Vishnu); Kal Garudar (Garuda)

Location
- Location: Natchiarkoil
- State: Tamil Nadu
- Country: India
- Coordinates: 10.9157°N 79.4456°E

Architecture
- Type: Tamil architecture
- Creator: Kochengat Cholan
- Elevation: 45.91 m (151 ft)

Nachiyar Kovil or Thirunarayur Nambi Temple is a Sri Vaishnava Hindu temple in Thirunarayur, a village in the outskirts of Kumbakonam in the southern Indian state of Tamil Nadu. It is dedicated to Niladevi, an aspect of the goddess Lakshmi, and her consort Vishnu. Nachiyar Koil is one of the divyadesams where Lakshmi is pradahana (main deity) over Vishnu. Thirunaraiyur is the sub urban region of business city of Kumbakonam.

Constructed in the Dravidian style of architecture, the temple is glorified in the Divya Prabandham, the early medieval Tamil canon of the Alvar saints from the 6th to 9th centuries CE. It is one of the 108 Divya Desams dedicated to Vishnu, who is worshipped as Srinivasa Perumal and his consort Lakshmi as Nachiyar. The temple is the place where god Vishnu is believed to have initiated Pancha Samskara (religious initiation) to Thirumangai Alvar. The temple follows the Tenkalai mode of worship, and the priests follow the Tenkalai tradition.

The temple is one of the Pancha Kshethram where Maha Lakshmi was found as girl child Vanjulavalli - the daughter of Maharishi Medhavi. The other four temples of the Pancha Kshethram are Sarangapani temple, Kumbakonam, Oppiliappan temple, Sundararaja Perumal Temple, Salem and Venkateswara Temple, Tirumala.

The temple is believed to have been built by Kochengat Cholan of the late 3rd century CE, with later contributions from Medieval Cholas and Vijayanagara kings. A granite wall surrounds the temple, enclosing all its shrines, while it has a five-tiered rajagopuram, the temple's gateway tower. The temple is maintained and administered by the Hindu Religious and Endowment Board of the Government of Tamil Nadu.

Vishnu is believed to have appeared to the sage Medhavi and married his daughter at this temple, witnessed by Brahma and other gods. Six daily rituals and four yearly festivals are held at the temple, of which the Brahmotsavam, celebrated during the Tamil month of Margali (December–January), is the most prominent. The Kal Garuda image in the temple used during the festive occasions is believed to increase in weight seeking 4, 8, 16, 32, 64 and 128 people in succession when the procession comes out of various gates from the sanctum to the main entrance of the temple. Nachiyarkovil is famous for Nachiarkoil lamp brass lamp. The lamps are made by resident artisans called Pathers (Kammalar) who are living in large numbers at Kammalar street, Natchiyarkovil.

== Legend ==
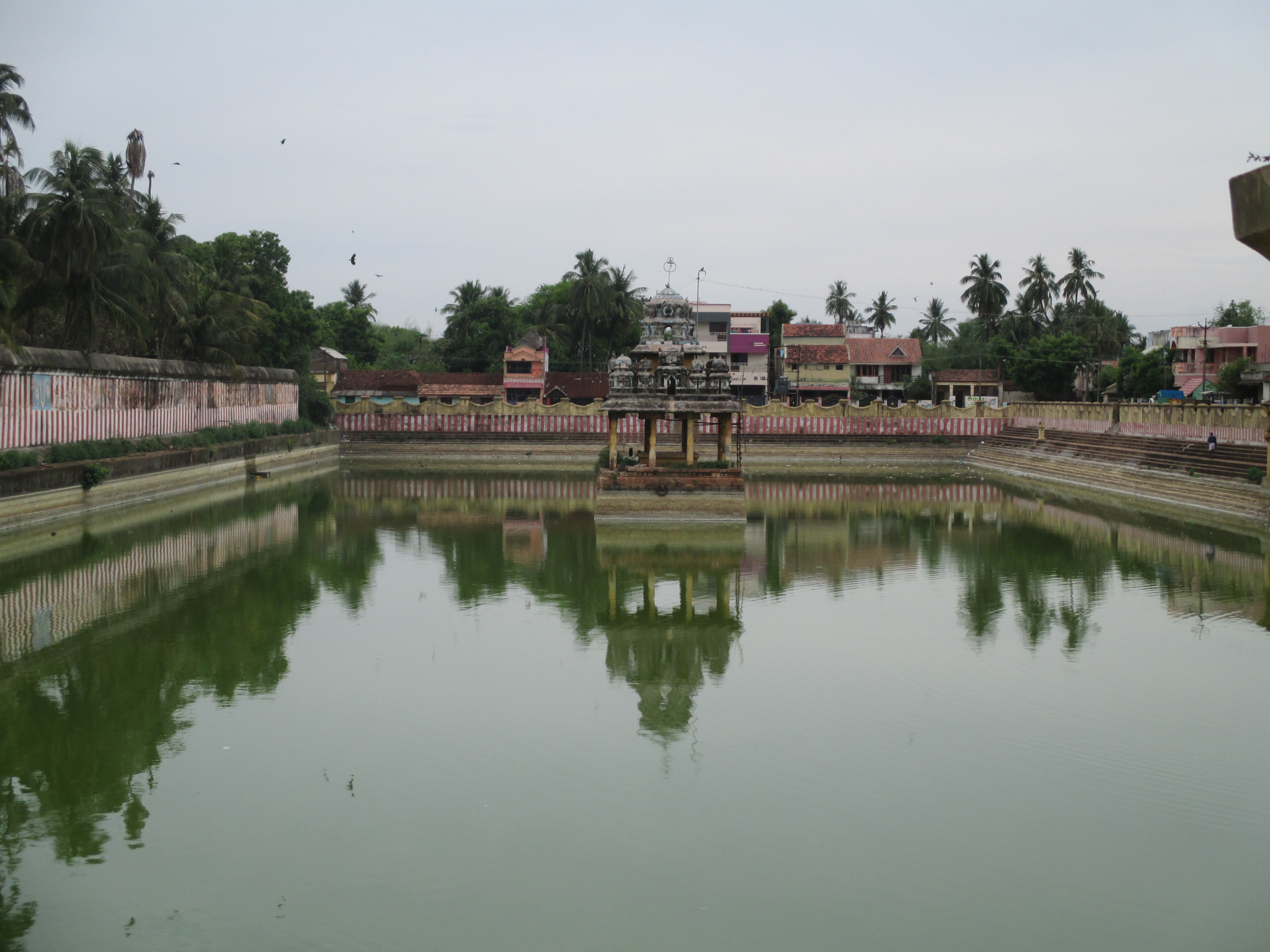
The temple tank adjacent to the temple

As per Hindu legend, the sage Medhavi was doing penance of goddess Mahalakshmi at this place. While taking a bath in the river, he found an image of Chakratalvar entwined with Yoga Narasimha. A divine voice asked him to install the image in his hermitage and worship it. The goddess Niladevi, the aspect of Lakshmi, and a consort of Vishnu chose to grow in the hermitage and appeared to the sage in the form of a small girl under a tree (Vanjula Tree) and hence Medhavi Maharishi named her "VANJULAVALLI" and raised her as his foster daughter. Vishnu traveled in search of Niladevi (Vanjulavalli) on his vehicle Garuda, the demigod-eagle. Garuda found the presence of Niladevi in the hermitage. Vishnu appeared to Medhavi, pleased by the latter's devotion and asked his daughter to be married to him. The sage happily aggred to marry Vanjulavalli to Vishnu, but under the condition that Nachiyar (Lakshmi) should always have primacy over Vishnu. Vishnu accepted his condition and both stayed in the ksetra upon his request. Because of the Medhavi's boon, in Nachiyar Koli the goddess rules over the God. Thayar (Lakshmi) is seated in the central sanctum alongside Perumal (Vishnu). In the processions, Lakshmi always comes first and Vishnu follows. There is another local legend that king Kochengat Cholan was once defeated and he was advocated to seek the blessings of Vishnu, which he obliged.

== Architecture ==
The temple is believed to have been built by King Kochengat Cholan. He is believed to have built 70 temples dedicated to Shiva and Thirunaraiyur is the only Vishnu temple constructed by him. The temple has a 5-tiered rajagopuram on the eastern side, raising up to a height of 75 ft (23 m). The entrance through the eastern gateway leads to a hall of 16 pillars, called Neenila Mutram. The centre of the hall is occupied by Dvajasthamba (the flag pole) and Balipeeda (the place of sacrifice), one behind the other. The front portion of the flag pole has a small shrine for Garuda. The flag pole, place of sacrifice and Garuda's shrine are in axial position from the entrance to the main sanctum. The shrine of Thirumangai Alvar is located on the northern side. The central hall of the temple, the Goratha Mandapam, houses the images of Ramanuja, Koorathalvar and idols of eleven Alvars, leaving that of Andal.

The southern side of the temple has a garden where the Magila tree, the Sthala Vriksha (temple tree) is present. The Vasantha Mandapa or the spring hall is located next to it, which hosts the Vasanthothsavam or spring festival during the Tamil month of Vaikasi (May–June). The temple also has a 100-pillared hall where the wedding festival is held during the Tamil month of Aavani (September–October). There is a separate shrine in the north that houses images of Rama, Lakshmana and Sita and another shrine in the south that houses the image of Hanuman. There is a shrine for Chakrathazhwar and Yoga Narasimha, believed to have been installed and worshipped by Sage Medhavi. The first precinct has separate shrines for Manavala Mamunigal and Vedanta Desika and idols of the utsava deities (festive images) of the 108 Divya Desams.

The temple has an elevated structure approached through a flight of 21 steps. The presiding deity of the temple is Vishnu in the form of Narayur Nambi and his consort Niladevi as Vanchulavalli Thaayaar (also called Neela Devi Nachiyar), both of whom are housed in the main sanctum. Unlike other Vishnu temples where Vishnu is given importance, in this temple Nachiyar (Thayar) is prominent. The sanctum also houses the images of Brahma, Pradyumna, Aniruddha, Sankarshana and Purushothaman (Vishnu) and a set of gods, who are depicted attending the wedding. The festive idols of Srinivasa (Vishnu), Sridevi (Lakshmi), Vanjulavalli (Niladevi) and Bhudevi are housed in the same shrine. The temple is maintained and administered by the Hindu Religious and Endowment Board of the Government of Tamil Nadu.

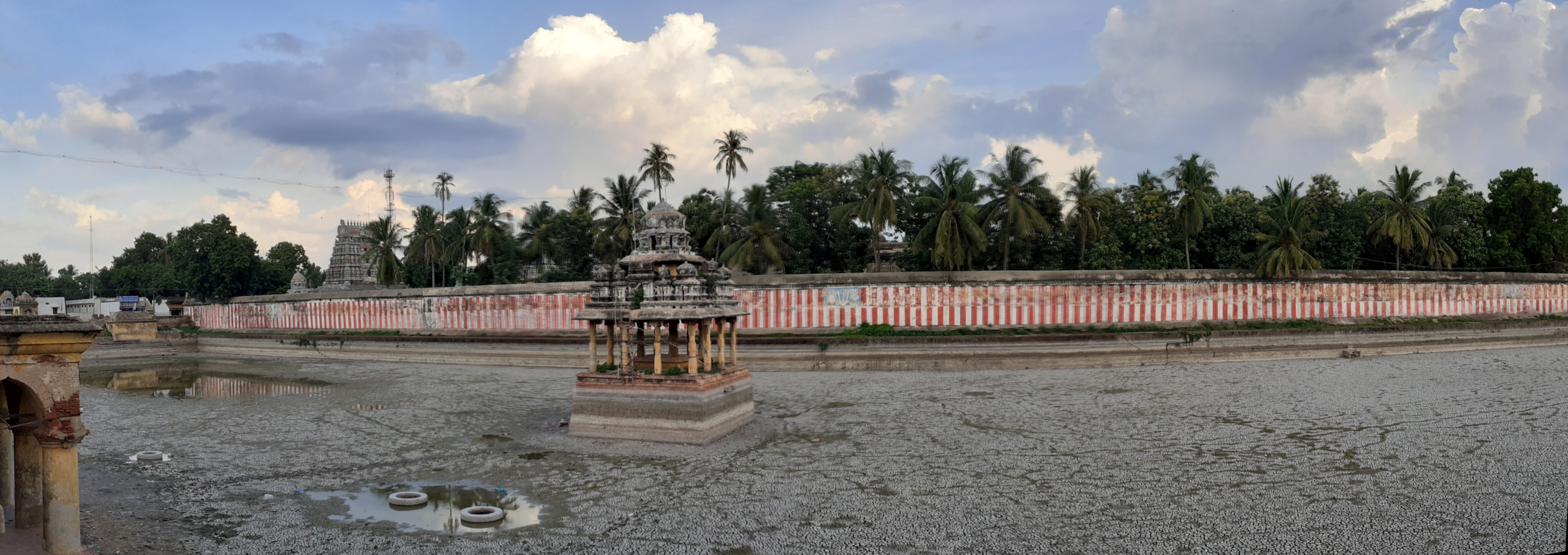
thumb

=== Kal Garuda ===
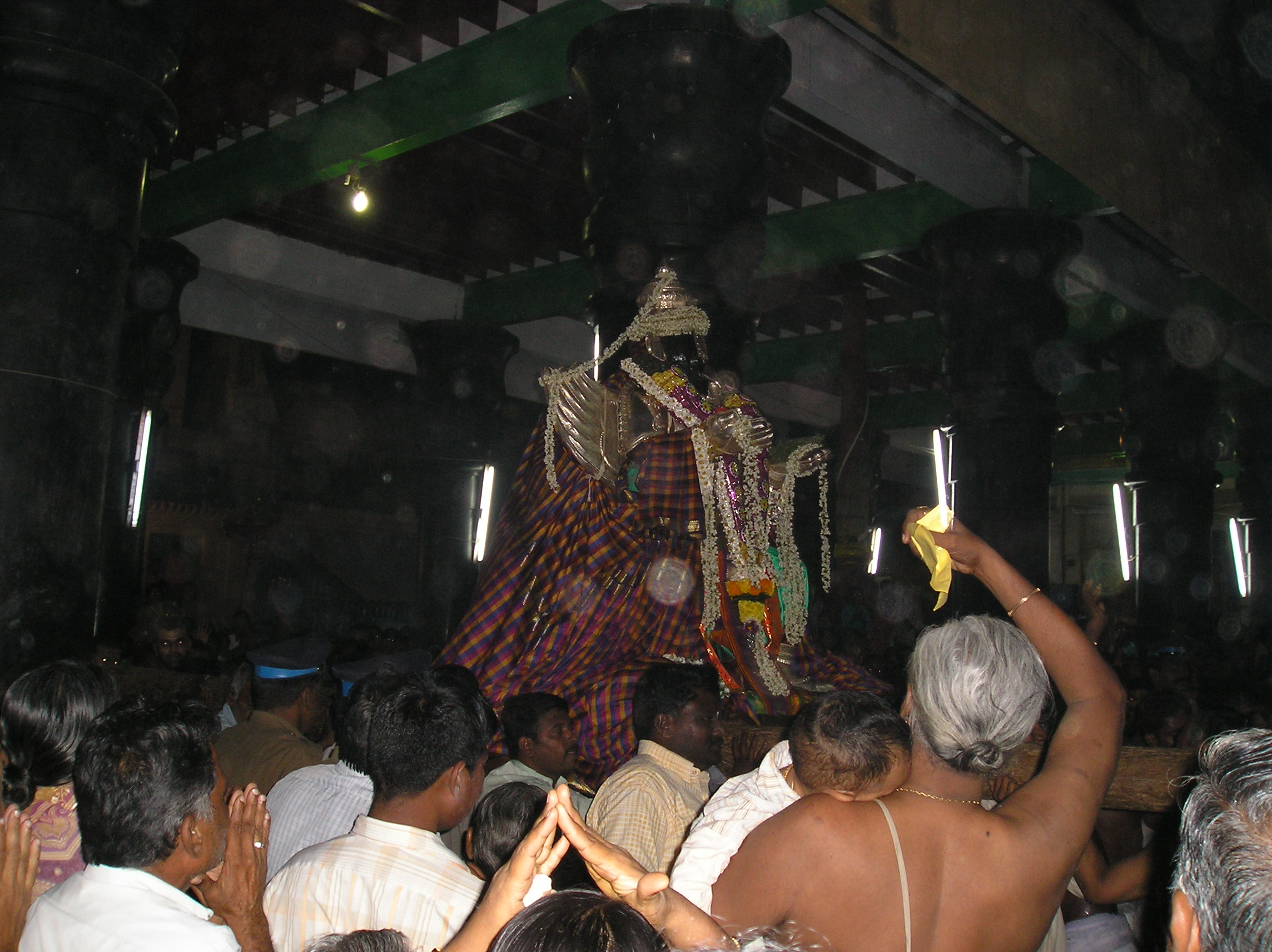
Kal Garudar (Stone Garuda) procession

Kal Garuda, an image of Vishnu's mount - Garuda, is the most prominent feature of the temple. As per local legend, the sculptor who sculpted the idol of Garuda got frustrated as the bird flew away each time, a new image was prepared. In frustration, he threw a stone at Garuda, who got injured and decided to stay at the temple as Kal Garuda. The image of Kal Garuda is made of saligrama and is housed in the shrine outside the main sanctum. During festive procession during the Tamil months of Margazhi (December–January) and Panguni (March - April), the festive images are carried out in procession in Kal Garudar. While only four people are needed to carry the idol of Garuda out of the shrine, it multiples to 8, 16, 32, 64 and 128 people when the image is taken outside the temple. The weight of the idol remains the same when carried by 4 people and stays the same when carried outside by 128. Only supernatural force is acting on that idol when 4 people carry, if we replicate the same idol somewhere else, 128 people are required to lift. On the way back only 4 people are required to carry the float in the decreasing order 128, 64, 32, 16, 8, 4. The aspect is treated magical as drops of sweat are also observed on the image of Kal Garuda during the six-hour-long procession. During the festive occasion, Garuda receives honors from Srinivasa Perumal (presiding deity) in the form of dress and ornaments. Jewels and dress are also presented to Garuda by Ranganatha, the presiding Vishnu form of Srirangam Ranganthaswamy Temple.

== Festivals ==
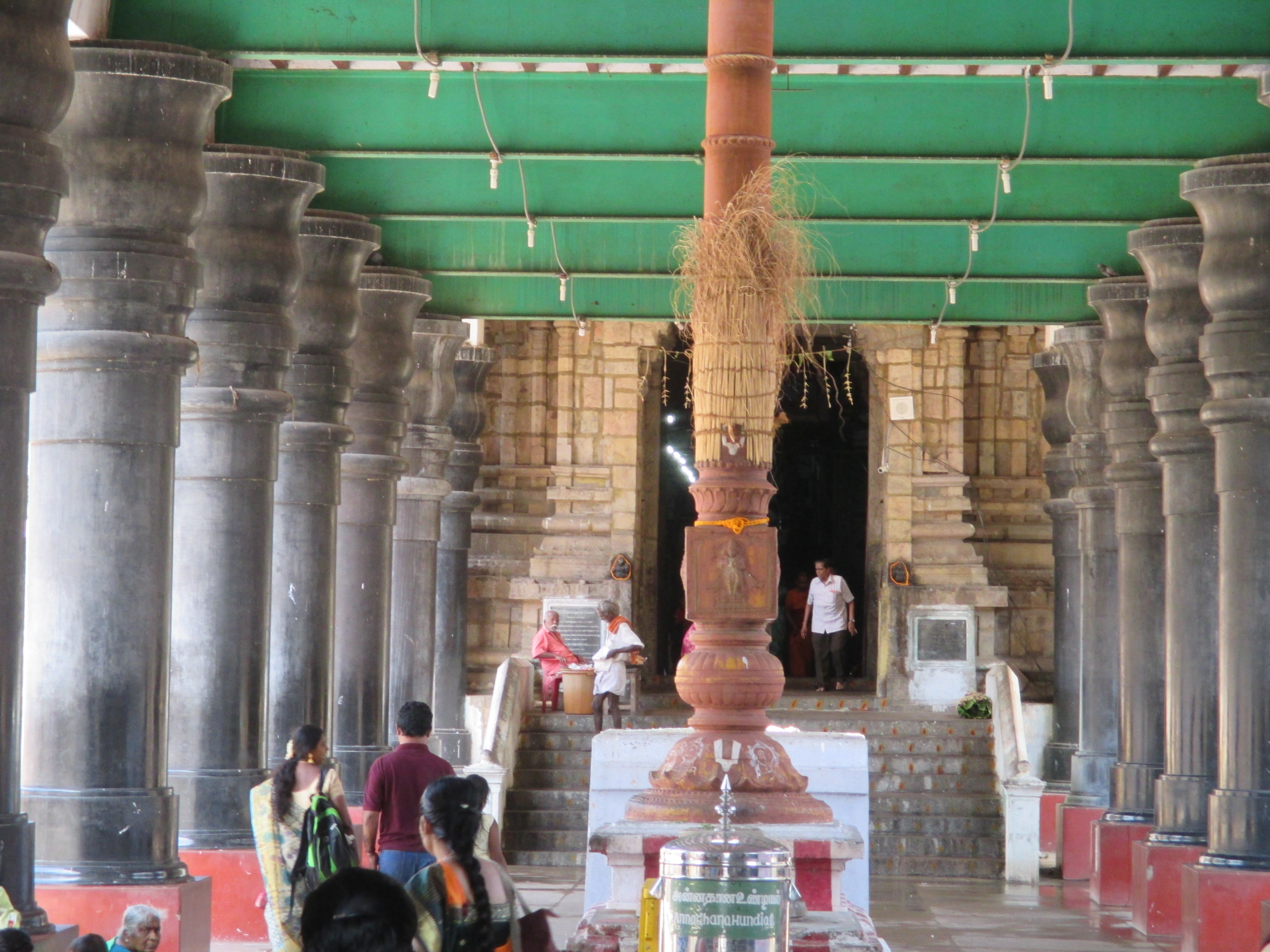
The temple shrines

As at other Vishnu temples of Tamil Nadu, the priests belong to the Vaishnavaite community, a Brahmin sub-caste.

The prime festival or Brahmmotsavam is a 10-day festival celebrated during the Tamil month of Margazhi (December–January). Garuda Sevai is celebrated during the Tamil month of Panguni (March–April). During both these festivals, the festive images of Kal Garuda are taken out around the streets of the temple. Vasanthothsavam or spring festival is celebrated during the Tamil month of Vaikasi (May–June). The Thirukalyana Utsavam or the wedding festival is celebrated in the 100-pillared hall during the Tamil month of Aavani (September–October). As per hagiographical records, it is believed that Vaikhasana form of worship was originally practiced and the temple started following Panchrartra form of worship after the advent of saint Ramanuja.

== Religious significance ==
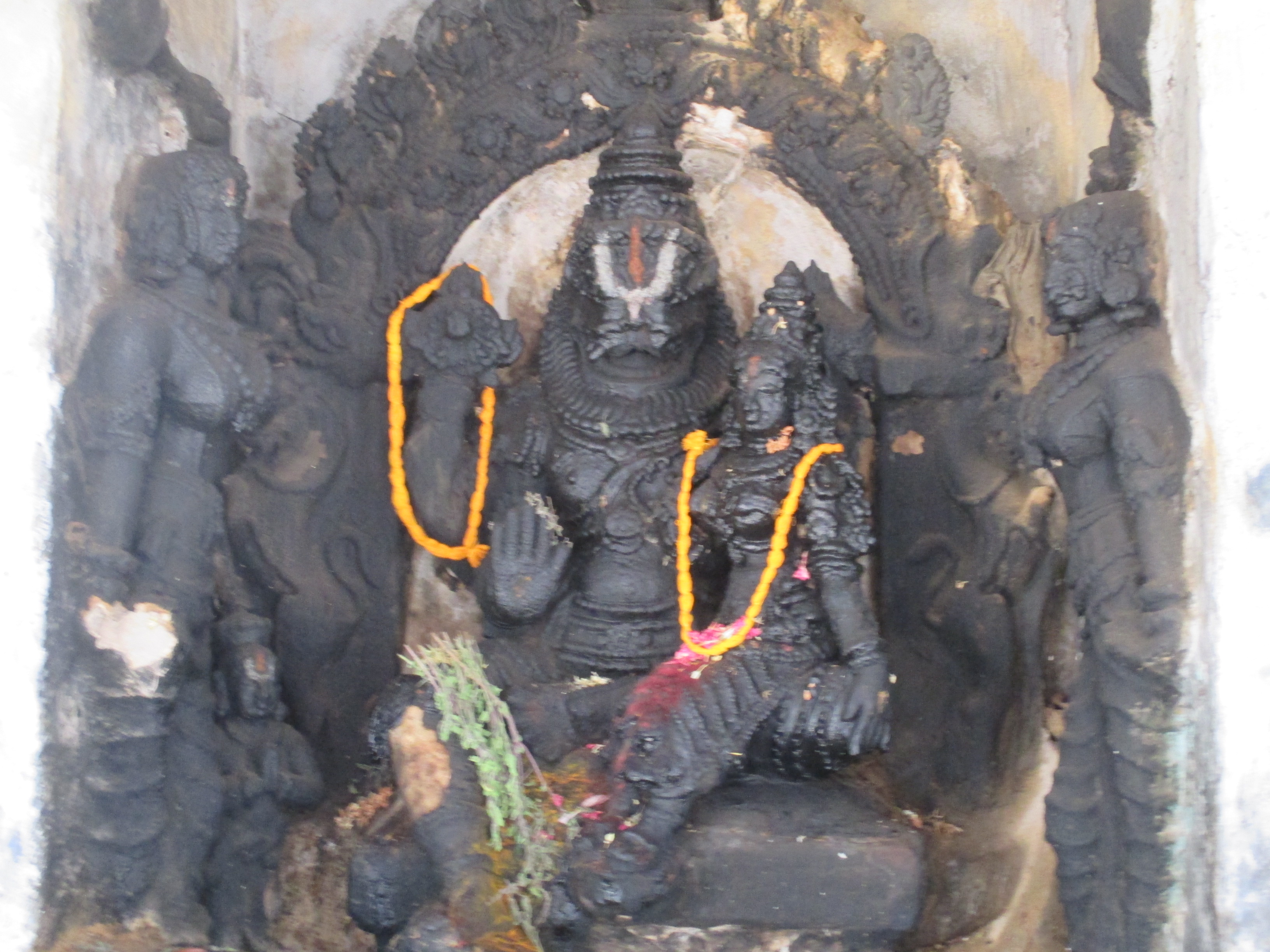
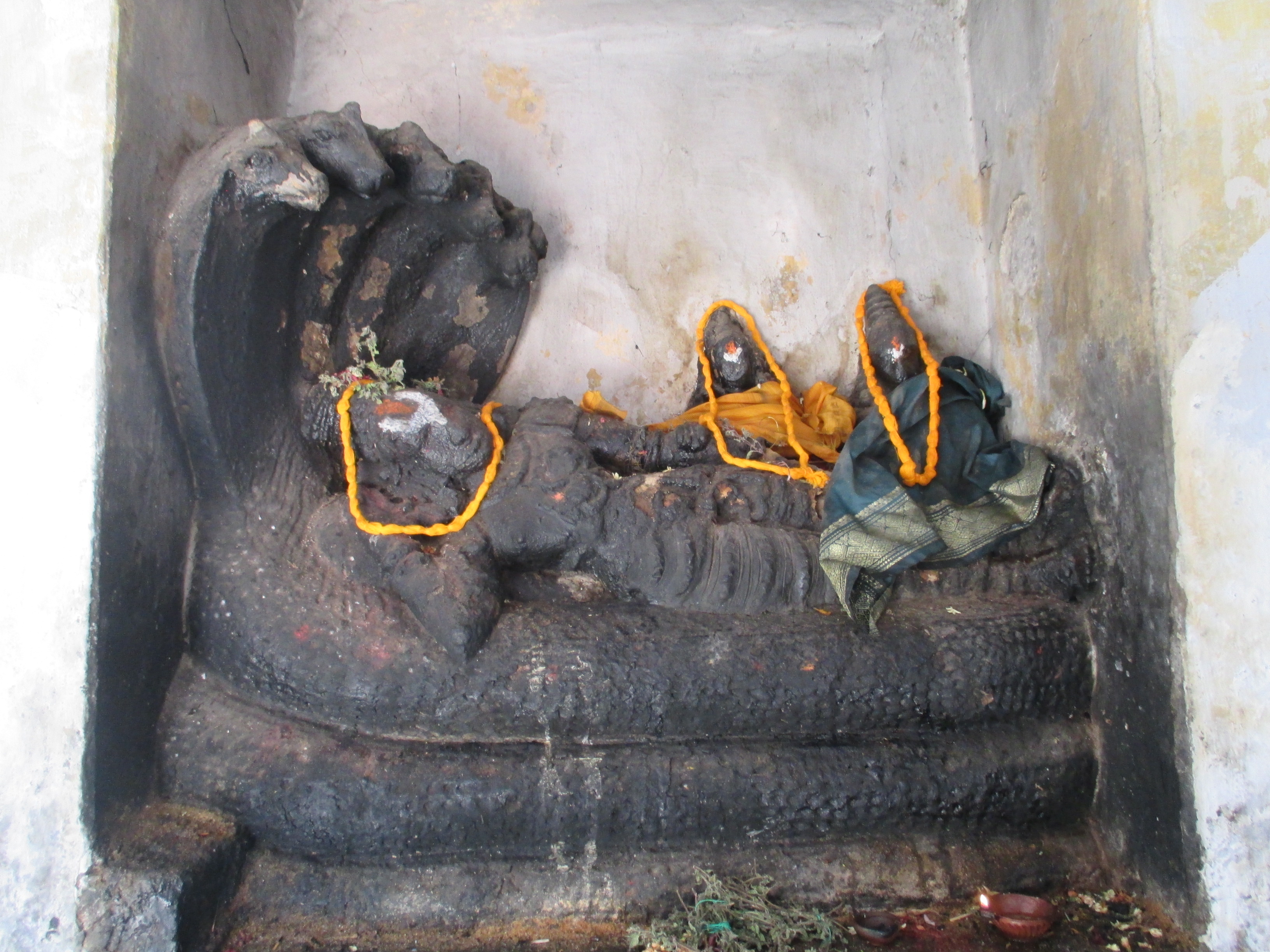
Sculpture of Narasimha and Ranganatha on the walls around the first precinct

The temple is revered in Nalayira Divya Prabandham, the 7th–9th century Vaishnava canon, by Thirumangai Alvar in hundred hymns. It is the second temple revered by Thirumangai having more than hundred verses, the first one being the Neelamegha Perumal Temple at Thirukannapuram. Thirumangai compares Srinivasa Perumal of the temple with Venkateshwara (form of Vishnu) at Tirupathi and believes that he found the same beauty in both of them. It is also believed that when Thirumangai was asked to present a madal (ballad) by Ranganatha of Srirangam Ranganathaswamy temple, Thirumangai replied that he built the walls in Srirangam, while he built the verses for Thirunaraiyur. It is believed that the Alvar had his initiation to Vaishnavism in this temple.

The temple is classified as a Divya Desam, one of the 108 Vishnu temples that are mentioned in the book. The temple is the place where Vishnu is believed to have initiated Pancha Samskara (religious initiation) to Thirmangai. The temple is also quoted as a Siddhi Kshetra, a sacred place where sages attain earthly liberation. The place is considered sacred on account of being the hermitage of Sage Medhavi. In Vaishanava theology, Varadaraja Perumal Temple at Kanchipuram is referred as Athigiri and Tirumala Venkateswara Temple at Tirupathi as Seshagiri and the temple at Thirunaraiyur is referred as Suganthagiri.

Nachiyar Koil is one of the few Divya Desams where the goddess has prominence over Vishnu. Some of the other temples where such female dominance is observed are Andal Temple at Srivilliputhur, Alagiya Manavala Perumal Temple at Woraiyur and Pundarikakshan Perumal Temple in Thiruvellarai. While Srivilliputhur is called Nachiyar Thiru Maaligai, Thirunaraiyur is called Nachiyar Koil.

According to local lore, Vishnu was of the view that during Kali Yuga, men would have to listen to women. Hence he decided that he would first set an example and listen to the goddess here. During all festive occasions, the first rights are reserved for Nachiyar, who moves ahead, while Srinivasa follows her. Even the food is first served to Nachiyar and then to Srinivasa. Being a temple where goddess has prominence, Vishnu is located slightly by the side and goddess has the prominent position inside the sanctum.

The place is the birthplace of Shaiva saint Nambiyandar Nambi. Though he was named Nambi after the presiding deity of the Vishnu temple, he followed Saivism. He was an eleventh-century Shaiva scholar of Tamil Nadu in South India who compiled the hymns of Sampantar, Appar and Sundarar and was himself one of the authors of the eleventh volume of the canon of the Tamil liturgical poetry of Shiva, the Tirumurai. The temple is counted as one of the temples built on the banks of River Kaveri.
