= Kandasamy Kandar =

Indian philanthropist

Kandaswami Kandar or Vallal Kandaswami Kandar was a philanthropist, from Nanjai Edayar, a small village near Paramathi Velur, Namakkal District, Tamil Nadu.

== Early life ==
Sri.Sankara Kandaswami Kandar was born to Sankara Kandar and Veerayi Ammal on 23 May 1880 in Nanjai Edayar. He had two siblings, a brother and a sister. The said sister was the wife of another philanthropist of this area Sri.Parimala Kandar.

After succeeding his father as Munsiff, Sri.Sankara Kandaswami Kandar started proving his efficiency as an able administrator despite had only elementary education. His work was enriched by his cleverness and his sense of social service and philanthropy. His agricultural enterprises prospered and he grew rich and he wanted to utilize his wealth for good causes.

== Charity ==
He spent money on renovating and building temples and helping devotees to visit religious places and offering worship. He also planned the uplift to the downtrodden not only in his village but in the entire Cauvery belt and Namakkal.

He called a meeting of his Vanniyar community elders, govt officials, socially conscious leaders and many others whom he regarded as well -wishers. The meeting, actually a statewide conference was organized and held at Nanjai Edayar in 1914, and this event had a tremendous impact in the region.

Prominent leaders and personalities from far and wide attended it and Sri Sankara Kandaswami Kandar outlined his plans for the uplift of the people in the region with his own resources. At the end of the deliberation, he was awarded the title of Sambu Kulasekarar in honour of his far reaching plans for social reforms.

== Kandasamy Kandar Trust ==
He founded the Kandasamy Kandar Educational Trust and started giving education to the rural children living nearby. After his demise, his brother-in-law Parimala Kandar enriched the service to the level of starting aa Arts&Science college in 1962 itself at Paramathi Velur, then a small village.

K. Kamaraj then Chief Minister of Tamil Nadu blessed the endeavour and the University of Madras gave affiliation first for the Pre-University course and later to Degree courses in Arts and Science subjects.

In 1967 the college moved to its own premises and C. N. Annadurai, then Chief Minister of Tamil Nadu declared it open.

In 1971, postgraduate courses in science subjects including microbiology and biotechnology were established. The University of Madras approved the college's research facilities, enabling the award of Ph.D degrees.

Apart from Kandasamy Kandar's college, this Vanniyakulakshatria trust is running Government aided Elementary schools, Government aided middle school, Higher secondary schools, Matriculation schools at Paramathi Velur, Namakkal, Kabilarmalai and Nanjai Edayar.

The trust's free homes for students are operated at Pamathi Velur, Salem and Chennai.

The Kandar trust is now headed by Dr.R.Somasundaram

== Present ==
Presently, the trust runs several Educational Institutions in the region. The trust is now governed by Tamil Nadu Vanniyar Public Properties Welfare Board as Kandasamy Kandar, the founder belongs to the Vanniyar Community.

== See also ==
- Chengalvaraya Naicker
- Arcot Dhanakoti Mudaliar
- Malladi Satyalinga Naicker
