= Kovanoor =

- village
- Country: India
- State: Tamil Nadu
- District: Pudukkottai

Languages
  - Official: Tamil
- Time zone: UTC+5:30 (IST)

Kovanoor is a village in Thanjavur district, Tamil Nadu, India.

This is a very small village situated between two tributaries of Kaveri Rivers (Aralaru & Thirumalairajan). This village is situated 3 km east of Nachiyar Koil near Kumbakonam. Nachiarkoil is one of the 108 Sri Vaishnava Divya Desams. Many Alwars have composed songs the ruling Deity of Nachiar Koil, Sri Sinivasa Perumal.

The ruling Deity of Kovanoor village is Sri Varada raja Perumal and Thayars are SriDevi and Bhoo Devi. The Deities are of standing positions (Nindra Thiru Kolam). The Deities are facing east.

The Uthsava Vigrahams are kept in the Nachiar Koil, due to security reasons. During festivals, efforts are made to bring the Uthsavars to the Kovanur temple. Village Deity Sri Kan Koduththa Mariyamman Temple every year mid of May month (Chithirai - Tamil month) continuously 15 days celebrates. In 2015 Sivan Koil also constructed by Villagers

Currently Daily Pooja is conducted by the Archakars from Nachiarkoil.

During the 1700s and 1800s and early 1900 there were about 50 Vaishnava families lived in this village. Now there is only one such family.

The village has a total populations of about 3000 families. Most of Peoples Hindu Vanniya Kula Kshatriyas (Padayatchi, Vanniyar) and Christian Padayachi. Agriculture is the primary occupation. Some of the villagers work in Brass lamp factories in the nearby Nachiar koil.

At one time the Temple had 10 vahanas and Braham Uthsavams were celebrated year after year by the Vada Kalai Temple.
