= Madappally =

Madappally may refer to:

- Madappally, Vatakara
- Madappally, Kottayam

== See also ==
- Madanpally
- Manappally
- Manappalli
