= Diya (lamp) =

Oil or ghee-based lamp used in religious rituals of Indian origin

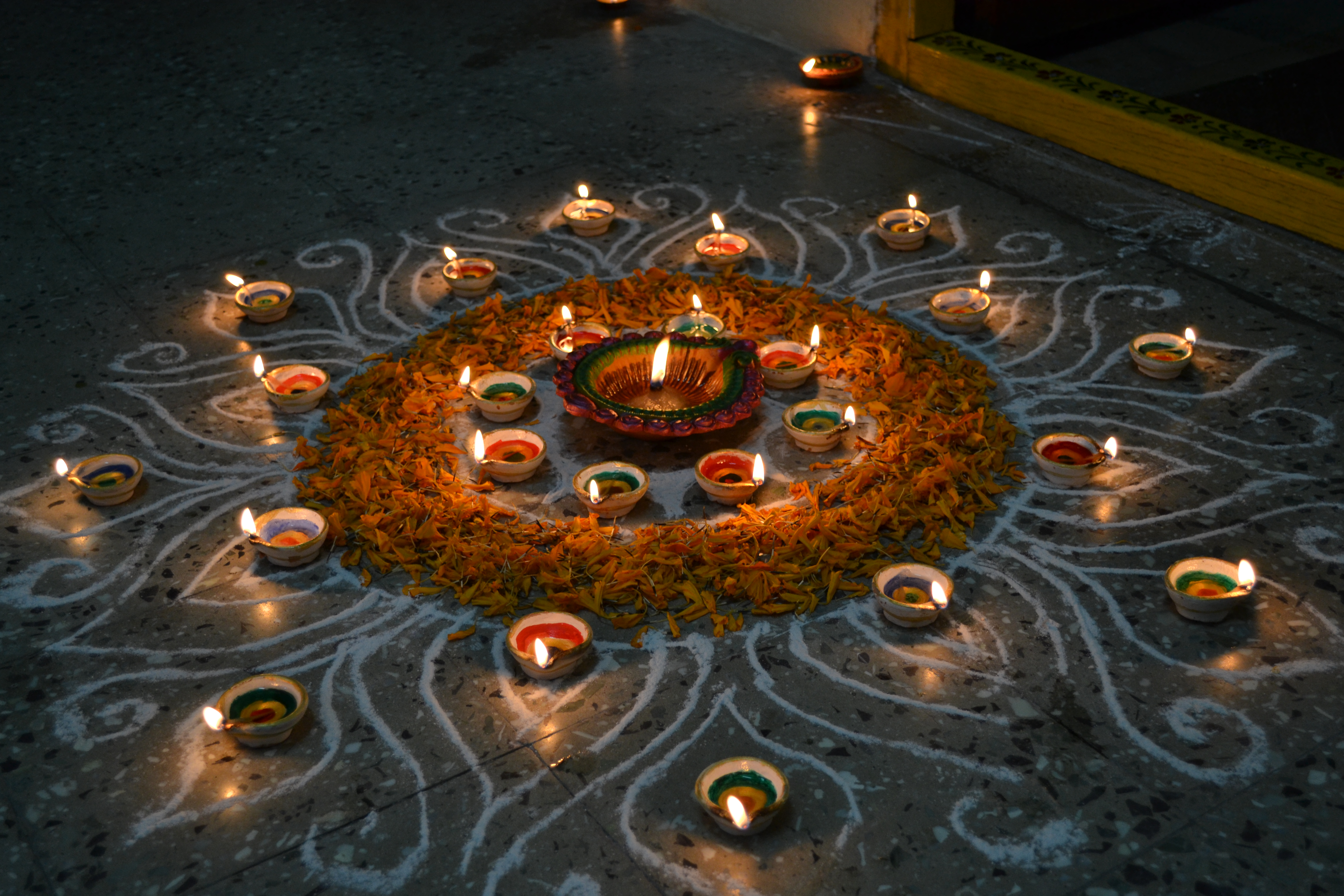
Diya lamps set around rangoli for festival.

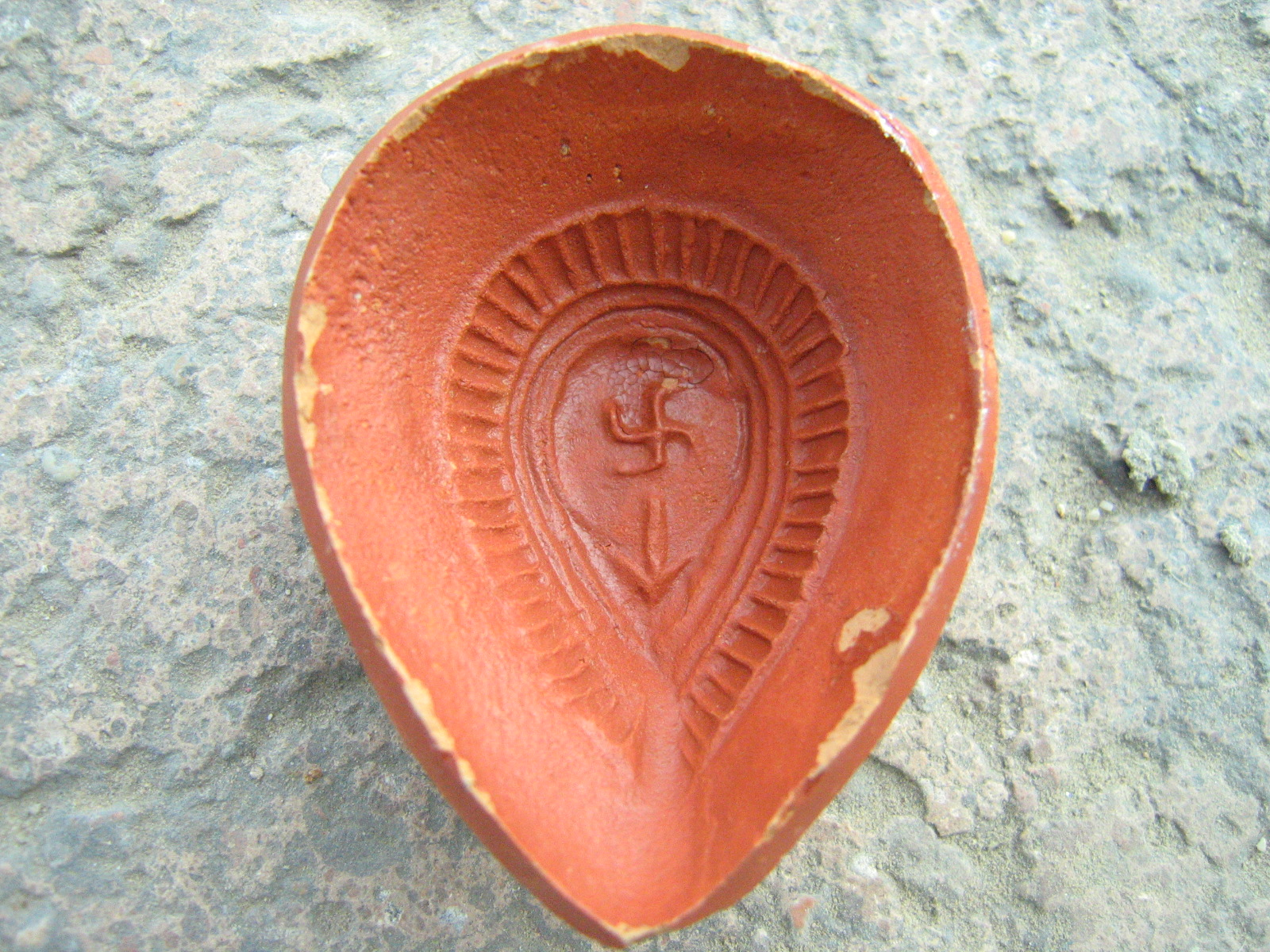
An earthen diya with sacred swastika engraved interior

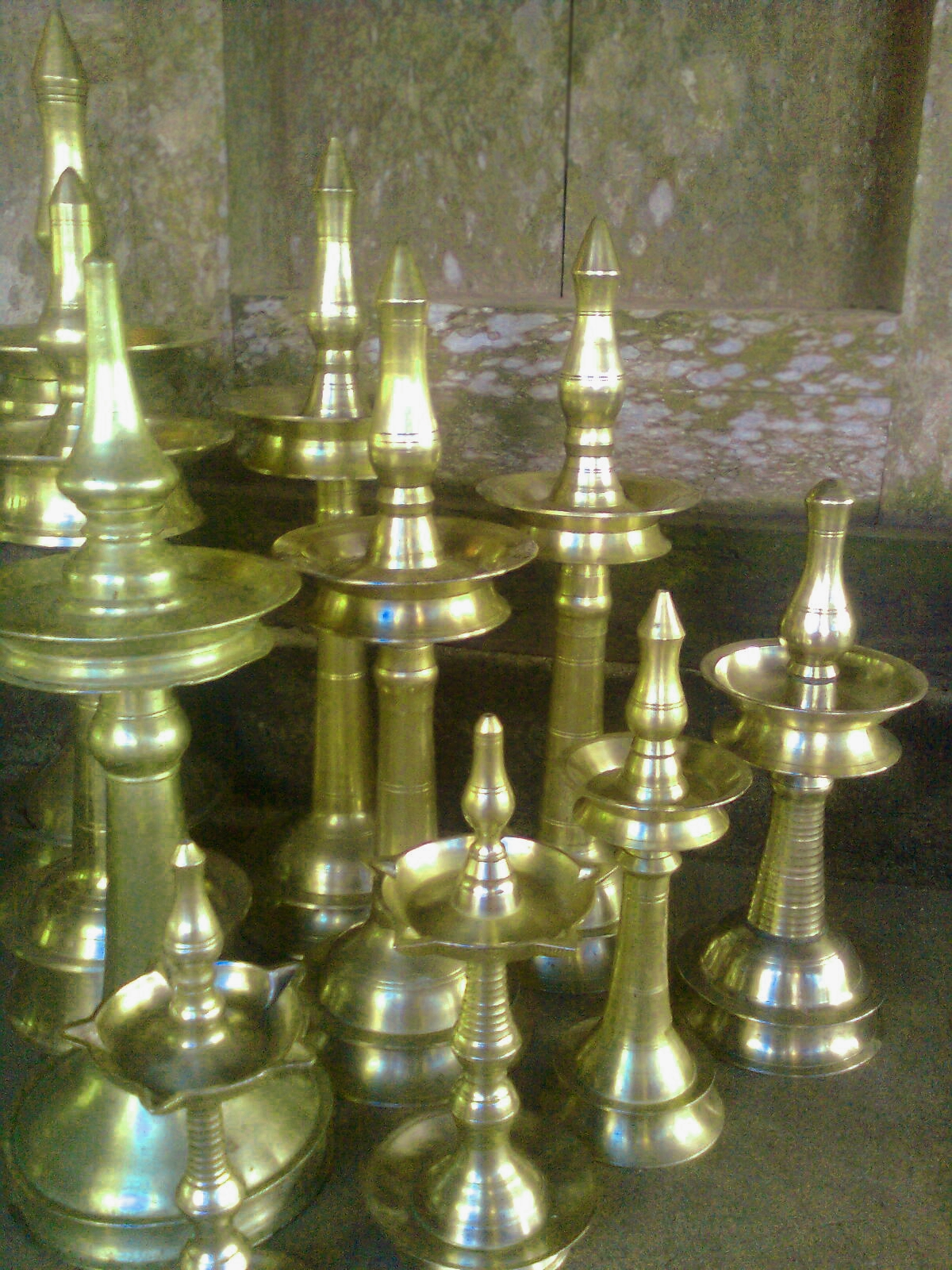
Bronze nilavilakku lamps commonly placed in front of altars at home.

A diya, diyo, deya, deeya, dia, divaa, deepa, deepam, deep, deepak or saaki (Sanskrit: दीपम्, romanized: Dīpam, Hindi: दीया, romanized: Dīyā) is an oil lamp made from clay, brass or silver with a cotton wick dipped in oil or ghee. These lamps are commonly used in the Indian subcontinent and they hold sacred prominence in Hindu, Sikh, Buddhist, and Jain prayers as well as religious rituals, ceremonies and festivals including Diwali.

The diya lamp was added to Unicode as U+1FA94 🪔 DIYA LAMP in 2019.

== Traditional use ==
Diyas are symbolically lit during prayers, rituals, and ceremonies; they are permanent fixtures in homes and temples. The warm, bright glow emitted from a diya is considered auspicious, regarded to represent enlightenment, prosperity, knowledge and wisdom. Diyas represent the triumph of light over dark, good over evil with the most notable example of this being on the day of Diwali. Diwali is celebrated every year to celebrate the return of Rama to Ayodhya as told in the Hindu epic, the Ramayana. Diwali marks the day Rama, Sita, and Lakshmana returned home to Ayodhya after 14 years in exile, after the defeat of Ravana. According to tradition, to welcome Rama, Sita, and Lakshmana home, the citizens of Ayodhya are said to have lit up the streets with diyas. They are regarded to be associated with Lakshmi in Hindu iconography and worship.

== Festivals ==
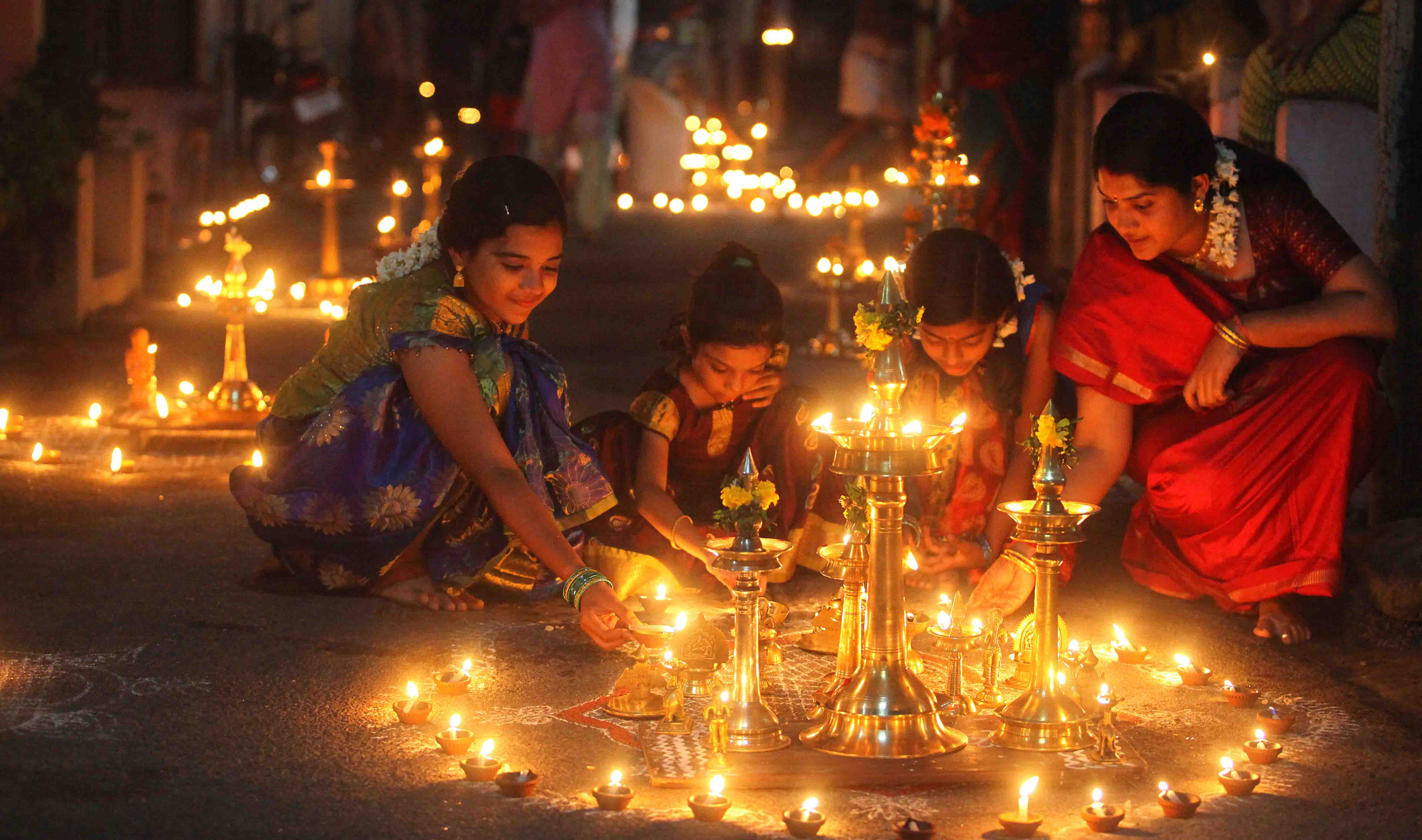
Lighting diya lamps during festival

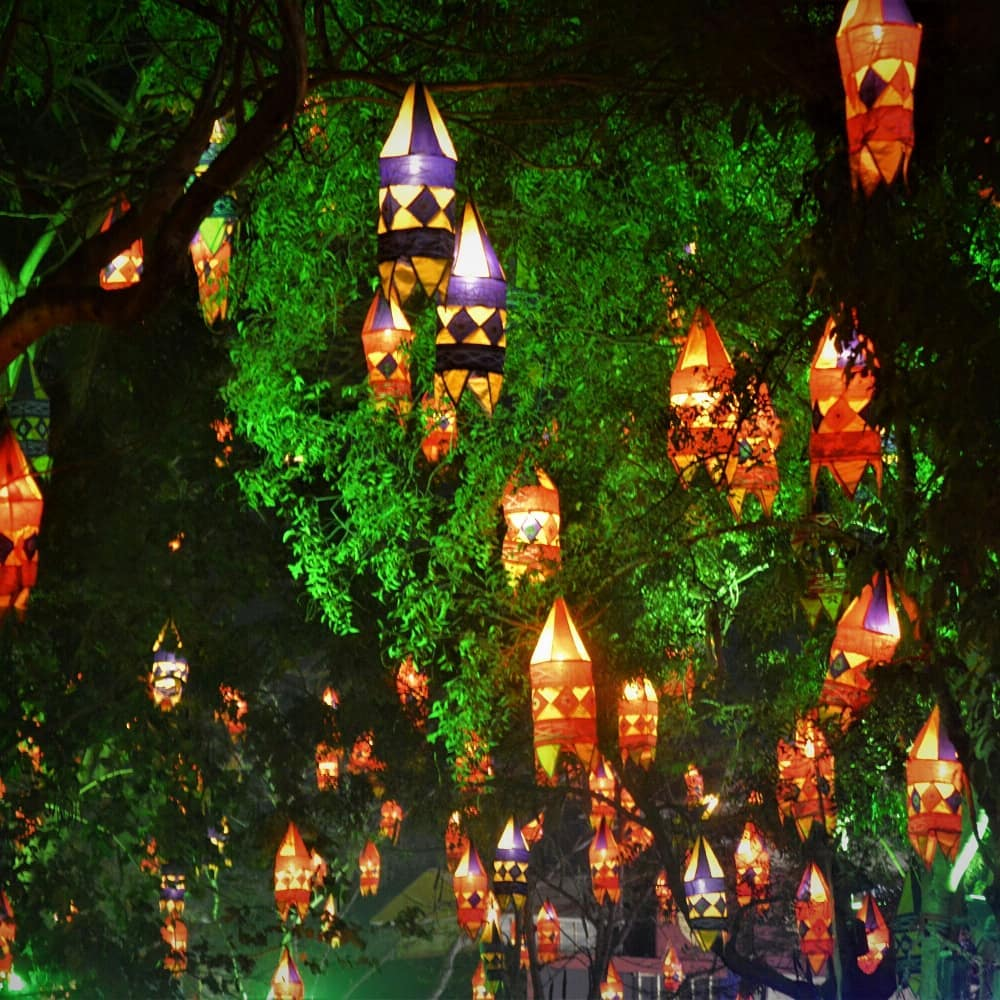
Traditional Chandua lantern hanging during Diwali.

- Diwali: The lighting of diyas is a central part of Diwali celebrations and rituals, one of the most important festivals in the Hindu calendar. Houses are decorated with small diyas placed along boundaries and entrances. The name Diwali itself derives from the Sanskrit deepavali, meaning "row of lights" ("deep" meaning diya and "avali" meaning row). Diwali is mentioned in early Sanskrit texts, such as the Padma Purana and the Skanda Purana, both of which were completed in the second half of the 1st millennium CE. The diyas are mentioned in Skanda Kishore Purana as symbolizing parts of the sun, the cosmic source of light and energy for all life, whose seasonal transition is marked in the Hindu calendar month of Kartik.
- Karthikai Deepam: Kartika Deepam (Tamil: கார்த்திகை தீபம், romanized: Kārtikai tīpam) is a festival of lights that is observed mainly by Hindu Tamils, and also by adherents in the regions of Kerala, Andhra Pradesh, Telangana, Karnataka, and Sri Lanka. Celebrated in Tamilakam and Sri Lanka since the ancient period, the festival is held on the full moon day of the Kartika (கார்த்திகை) month, called the Kartika Pournami, falling on the Gregorian months of November or December. It is marked on the day the full moon is in conjunction with the constellation of Kartika. It corresponds to the occasion of the Kartika Purnima, though it falls on a different day due to the correction of equinoxes in the Tamil calendar. In Kerala, this festival is known as Trikkartika, celebrated in the honour of Chottanikkara Bhagavati, a form of Lakshmi. It is celebrated in the name of Lakshabba in the Nilgiris district of Tamil Nadu.

=== Worship and prayers ===
Lit diyas that are placed before deities during prayer in temples and then used to bless worshippers is referred to as an arati.

A similar lamp called a butter lamp is used in Tibetan Buddhist offerings as well.

=== Hindu rituals ===
Birth: The lighting of diya is also part of the Hindu religion rituals related to birth.

Arti (Hindi: आरती, romanized: Ārtī) or Arati (Sanskrit: आरति, romanized: Ārati) is a Hindu ritual employed in worship, part of a puja, in which light (from a flame lit using camphor, ghee or oil) is ritually waved for the veneration of deities. Arti also refers to the songs sung in praise of the deity, when the light is being offered. Sikhs also perform arti in the form of arti kirtan which involves only devotional singing but Nihang Sikhs specifically perform arti which uses light as well.

== Types ==
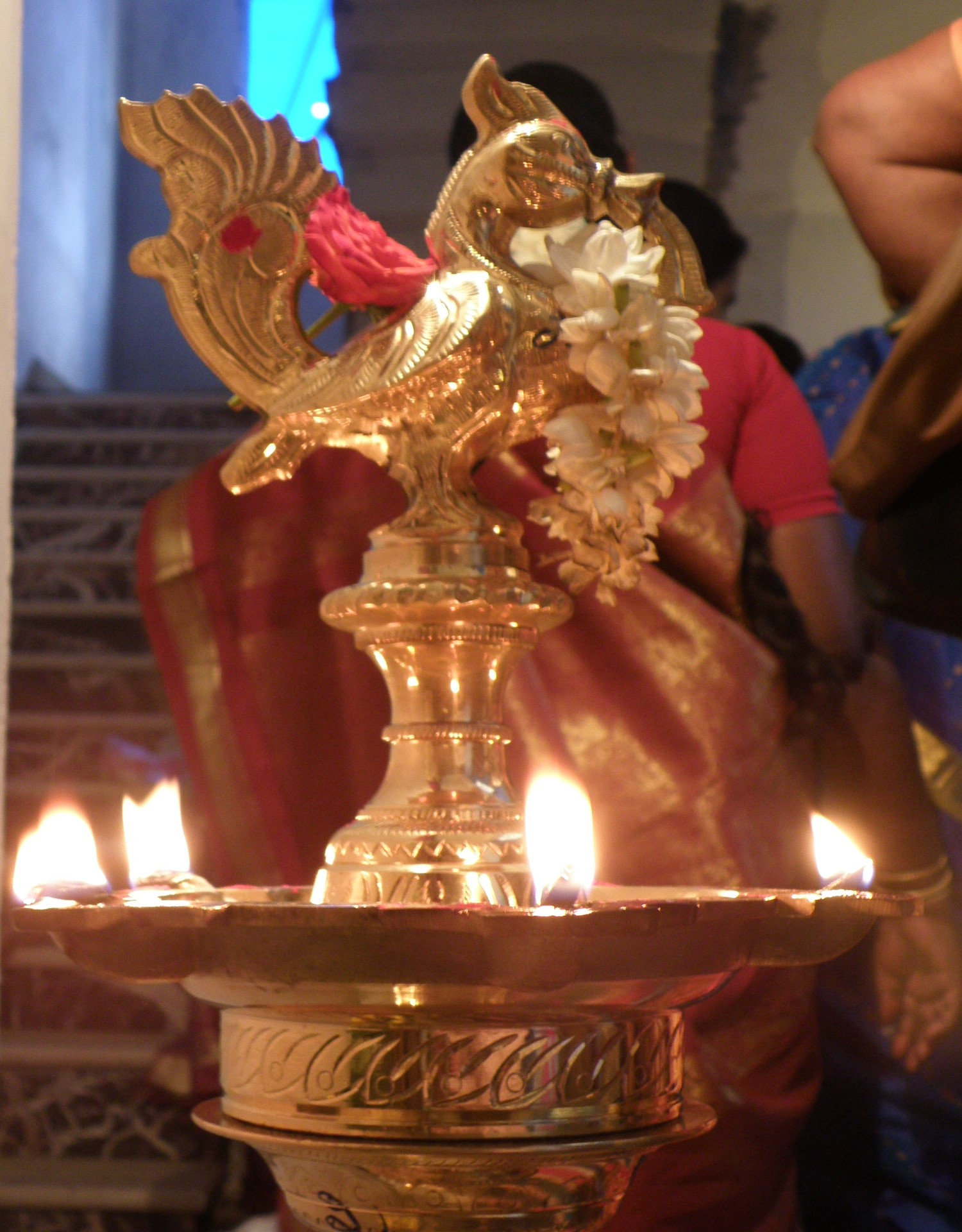
Top of the ornamental Nachiarkoil or Annam lamp of Tamilnadu

In terms of the choice of material, the kiln fired earthenware lamps followed by the metallic lamps with multiple wicks, mostly of brass known in regional vernaculars as Nilavilakku, Kuthuviḷakku, Kundulu, Deepada Kamba, Panas, Samai, Pilisajā, Pilibeṛhi, Pahana are the most common, though other materials are also used such as patravali floating lamp made from leaves, banana stems, bamboo stems or permanent lamps made of stones called Kalvilakku.

Diyas with one wick are most common, followed by the two wick style, but other variations such as four, five or seven wick lamps are also made. The ornamental lamps come in various designs. The iconic Nachiarkoil lamp, also known as "Annam lamp", is produced exclusively in by the Pather (Kammalar) community in Nachiyar Koil of Tamil Nadu.

Diya lamps appear in many forms, the most common being humble kiln-fired earthenware, while more ornate versions are crafted in brass with multiple wicks (two, four, five or even seven) or made from leaves/flotation or stone for permanent use.

== See also ==
- Other lamps
  - Butter lamp
  - Navratra Akhand Jyoti
  - Nachiarkoil lamp
  - Nilavilakku lamp
  - Sky lantern
  - Types of Indian oil lamps
- Related topics
  - Aarti
  - Diwali
  - Rangoli
  - List of light sources
