= Siddha Natheswarar Temple =

Shiva temple in Tamil Nadu, India

Siddha Natheswarar Temple is a Hindu temple located in the village of Thirunarayur in the Thanjavur district of Tamil Nadu, India. The presiding deity is Shiva.

== Location ==
The temple is located near Nachiyar Koil, a temple dedicated to Vishnu. Thirunarayur is located at a distance of 10 kilometres from Kumbakonam on the road to Tiruvarur.

== Deity ==
The principal deity is Siddha Nateswarar, a form of Shiva. There are shrines to Ganesha, Soundaranayaki, Dakshinamurthy, Lakshmi, Brahma, Bhairava and the Navagrahas.

== Significance ==
Hymns in praise of the temple were sung by Sambandar and Sundarar.
