= Naicker =

Naicker may refer to:

- Nayak (title), or Naicker in Tamil, an Indian honorific title
- Naicker (name), a surname of Indian Tamil origin

== See also ==
- Nayak (disambiguation)
