= JBP =

JPB may refer to:

- Jabalpur Junction railway station, Madhya Pradesh, India
- Jordan Bernt Peterson (born 1962), Canadian psychologist, author, and media commentator
- J. B. Prashant More (born 1955), French historian, author and teacher
