= Nanjai Edayar =

- Village panchayat
- Location in Tamil Nadu, India Nanjai Edayar (India)
- Coordinates: 11°05′52.7″N 78°02′04.3″E
- Country: India
- State: Tamil Nadu
- District: Namakkal
- Taluk: Paramathi Velur taluk
- Union: Mohanur
- Founder: Nanjai Edayar people

Government
  - Type: Village panchayat
  - Body: Nanjai Edayar Village panchayat
  - Chief Minister: J. Jayalalithaa
  - Namakkal M.P.: P. R. Sundaram
- Elevation: 121 m (397 ft)

Population (2011)
  - Total: 3,690
- Demonym: Indian

Languages
  - Official: Tamil (தமிழ்)
- Time zone: UTC+5:30 (IST)
- PIN: 638182
- Vehicle registration: TN-28

Nanjai Edayar is a village panchayat (council) located in the Namakkal district of Tamil Nadu state, India.

== Geography ==
Nanjai Edayar is located 25 km (16 mi) south of the district headquarters Namakkal, 3 km (1.9 mi) from Paramathi Velur (the biggest town in Paramathi Velur Taluk), 14 km (8.7 mi) from Mohanur, and 380 km (240 mi) from the state capital Chennai.

Kalipalayam (8 km), Manappalli (8 km), Manickanatham (8 km), Irukkur (10 km), Pillaikalathur (10 km) are neighboring villages.

The Thirumanimutharu Mutharu joins the Kaveri (Cauvery) river at Nanjai Edayar. The river Manimutharu starts at Salem and runs through Paramathi Velur, joining the Cauvery at Nanjai Idayaru village.

== Temples ==
Thiruveleeswarar temple (built by Rajaraja Chola), Azhagu Nachchiyar temple, Mariamman temple, and Raja temple are places of worship there.

Thiruveleeswarar temple’s history dates back to the time of the Mahabharatha epic and is one of the five Shiva temples where Bheema worshipped.

The five Shiva temples are situated on the banks of the Manimutharu– Sukavaneswarar in Salem, Karapuranathar in Uthamachozhapuram, Veeratteeswarar in Pilloor, Bheemeswarar in Mavureddi, and Tiruveneeswarar in Nanjai Idayaru.

Worshipping at all the five temples simultaneously is considered by locals as a source of good luck.

Azhagu nachiar car festival is held every year.

== Economy ==
A free coaching center has been run by the Government that helps unemployed people prepare for their competitive exams. People from nearby villages are also assisted there.

Publisher Nanjai Pathippagam publishes books for children and students.

== Notable people ==
- Kandasamy Kandar (founder, Kandar trust)
- M. Rathnasabapathy (former president, Kandar trust and founder of Tamilnadu Kabadi association)

== Culture ==
The village is considered a symbol of old Tamil and Hindu dharma, thanks to its five rest homes or Savadis available to travelers.

== Kandasamy Kandar Trust ==
The founder of the Kandasamy Kandar Trust, Sri Kandasamy Kandar, is from Nanjai Edayar. The Trust runs government-supported elementary schools, middle schools, higher secondary schools, matriculation schools, and colleges at Paramathi Velur, Namakkal, Kabilarmalai, and Nanjai Edayar. The Trust provides free homes for students and operates in Paramathi Velur, Salem, and Chennai. Free milk for village infants has been supplied by the Trust for more than 100 years.

Dr. R. Somasundaram now heads the Trust. He was nominated as a member of the Tamilnadu Vanniakula Kshatriya Public Charitable Trust and Endowments by the Government of Tamil Nadu.
