= Naicker (name) =

Tamil name

Naicker is an Indian name of Tamil origin, related to the title Nayak.

People with this name include:

- Chengalvaraya Naicker (1825–1874), Indian philanthropist
- George Naicker (1919–1998), South African Indian anti-apartheid activist of Indian Tamil descent
- Malladi Satyalingam Naicker (1840–1915), Indian philanthropist and educationalist
- M. Alagappa Manickavelu Naicker (1896–1996), known as M. A. Manickavelu, Indian politician of the Indian National Congress and founder of the Commonweal Party
- Marimuthu Pragalathan "M. P." Naicker (1920–1977), South African Indian journalist, anti-apartheid activist, and trade unionist
- Gangathura Mohambry "Monty" Naicker (1910–1978), South African medical doctor and anti-apartheid activist
- Narainsamy Thumbi "N. T." Naicker (1922–2003), South African Indian teacher, attorney, political prisoner, general secretary of the Natal Indian Congress and the South African Indian Congress, accused in the 1956 Treason Trial; mentor to Navi Pillay
- Sardar P. M. Audikesavalu Naicker (1898–1964), Indian freedom fighter and legislator active in the Madras Presidency
- Sherwyn Naicker (born 1991), South African former professional soccer player
- Theesan Naicker (born 1999), South African cricketer

== See also ==
- Kerishnie Naiker, South African pharmacist and beauty pageant titleholder
