= Nagappan Padayatchi =

South African martyr

- Born: 1891; Mayavaram, Madras, India
- Died: July 6, 1909; Johannesburg, Transvaal, South Africa
- Other name: Swamy Nagappan Padayachee
- Occupations: Satyagrahi; laborer
- Known for: Satyagraha martyr (1909)

Nagappan Padayatchi or Swamy Nagappan Padayachee (1891 – 6 July 1909) was an Indian South African Satyagraha martyr.

== Early life ==
Nagappan Padayatchi was an Indian born in Mayavaram in the Tanjore district of Madras Presidency, today's Mayiladuthurai district of Tamil Nadu.

== Involvement in Satyagraha ==
Nagappan involved in Satyagraha with Mahatma Gandhi on 1909. He was sentenced to 10 days hard labor on 21 June 1909 during the first Satyagraha campaign.

== Death ==
Nagappan was about 18 years old when he was sentenced on 21 June 1909 to the three pounds or ten days imprisonment with hard labor. After spending a night at the Fort he was made to walk to the Jukskei Road Prison Camp, 26 km away. He was discharged from the camp on 30 June and died on 6 July of double pneumonia and resultant heart failure. His body was full of bruises and weals. Fellow prisoners reported that he had been physically abused in prison by at least one warden, and that his illness was neglected by the prison authorities and he was still expected to carry out his hard labor sentence, this ultimately led to his death. Despite all the evidence, the official enquiry exonerated the prison officials and rejected the allegations of the appalling conditions in the Camp.

== Memorial ==
In 1914 Mohandas Gandhi unveiled a memorial tablet to Padayachee, as for Gandhi, they were inspirations, "like a lighted match to dry fuel". Struggle stalwart Walter Sisulu unveiled a tombstone for Nagappan, 20 April 1997, in Gandhi Hall. The hall is located on the corner of Ferreira and Marshall streets in down town Johannesburg. It was built by the Transvaal Hindu Seva Samaj in 1939, and was used as a meeting place by the ANC and other anti-apartheid groups.
