= Tamil Nadu Vanniyar Public Properties Welfare Board =

The Tamil Nadu Government established the Vanniyar Public Properties Welfare Board to identify Vanniyar Charitable Trusts created by Vanniyar philanthropists, consolidate those trusts, research ways to ensure the fulfillment of the objects of the Trusts, and confirm that the benefits reached the intended sections of the Vanniyar community.

People belonging to the Vanniyar community live in various parts of Tamil Nadu. A number of philanthropists belonging to this community have dedicated their properties for various charitable purposes by creating trusts/endowments, such as choultries for feeding the poor, institutions for the advancement of education, medical relief and public health and other similar objects.

Properties endowed in the past have not been carefully maintained, and several have either been improperly sold or left to be encroached on, while the charities were not performed, and thus the testators’ wishes remained unfulfilled.

People interested in the preservation, protection and maintenance of various such trusts/endowments asked the Government to constitute a separate board to consolidate such trusts/endowments, preserve the properties, and fulfill the wishes of the testators by providing them with good administration, so the trusts/endowments could carry out the objects for which they were created without hindrance.

The Government constituted a board in 2009, to safeguard the property of such trusts/endowments for the benefit of the Vanniyar community and the public at large. It comprises a Special Officer from the Indian Administrative Service, a legal adviser, who is a retired District and Sessions Judge, a Tahsildar and support staff.

== General functions ==
- Identifying Trusts created by Vanniyar philanthropists for the benefit of Vanniyakula Kshatriyas and the general public.
- Preparing a list of Vanniyar Trusts and Endowments with details of Trustees, properties bequeathed, and purposes of the trusts.
- Monitoring the achievement of the objectives of the Trusts.
- Providing guidelines to the Trustees in their duties, wherever needed.
- Streamlining the use of the Trust Properties, wherever needed.
- Rendering necessary help to the Trusts in performing their duties.
- Aiding the Trusts in ending encroachments on the Trust properties (according to rules and by lawful means).
