= Niladevi =

Hindu goddess, an aspect of Lakshmi

- Goddess of Bliss
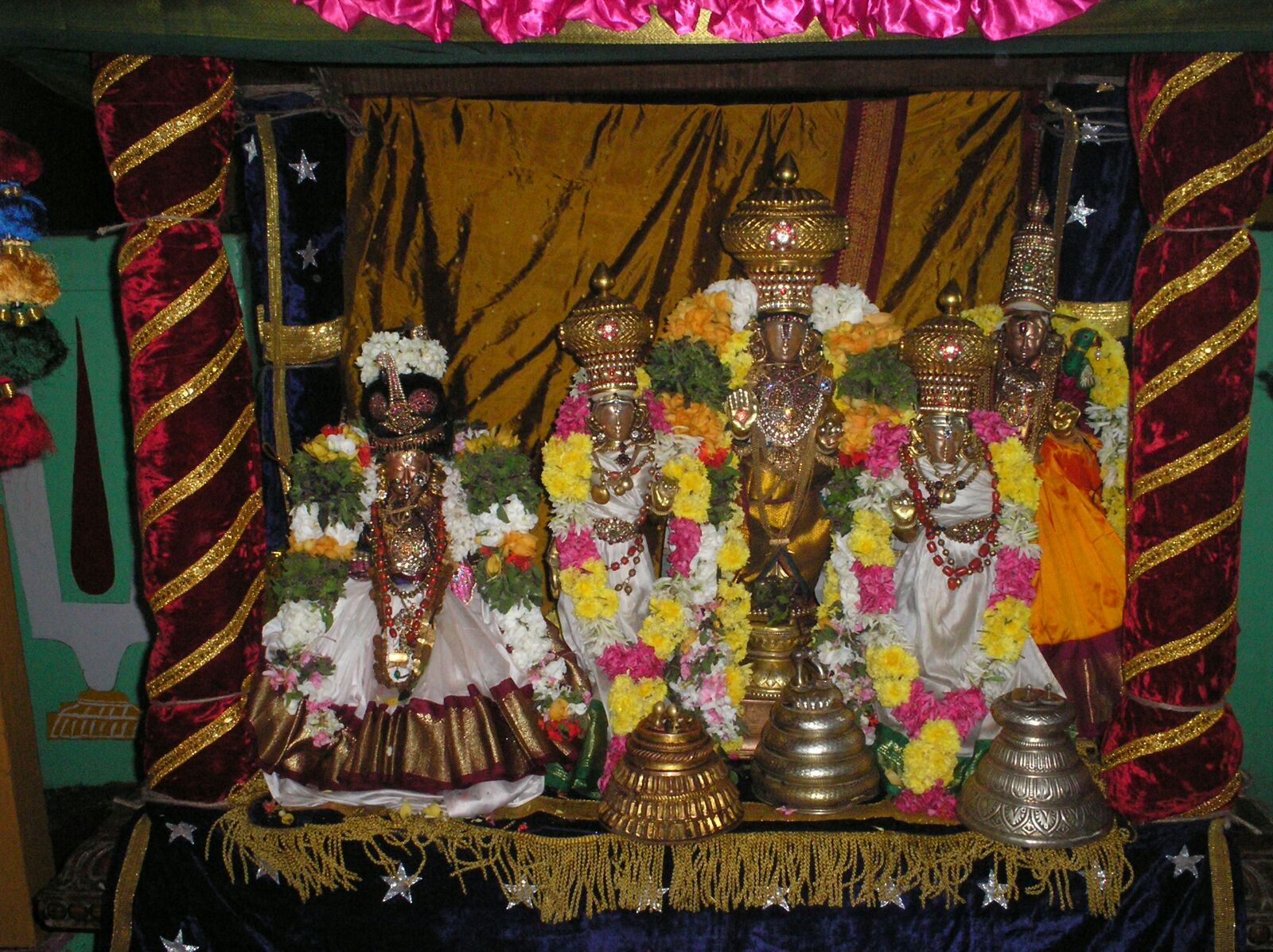
- Shrine of Niladevi (left to the image of Vishnu) in Thirukkadigai
- Other names: Nappinnai
- Venerated in: Sri Vaishnavism
- Affiliation: Aspect of Lakshmi
- Abode: Vaikuntha
- Mantra: Nila Suktam (Yajurveda)
- Temple: Thirunarayur Nambi Temple
- Consort: Vishnu

Niladevi (Sanskrit: नीलादेवी, romanized: Nīlādevī, lit. 'blue goddess'), also known as Nappinnai, is a Hindu goddess. Rendered as the goddess of bliss. She is primarily revered in South India, particularly in Tamil culture, as one of Vishnu's consorts. In Sri Vaishnava tradition, all three consorts of Vishnu—Sridevi, Bhudevi, and Niladevi—are regarded as aspects of Lakshmi.

In Vishnu's avatar as Krishna, Niladevi is either regarded as Nagnajiti, the consort of Krishna in Dvārakā, or in some accounts, as a southern counterpart of Radha, the gopi consort of Krishna in North Indian traditions.

== Legend ==
According to Sri Vaishnava tradition, Niladevi incarnated as Nagnajiti, a wife of Krishna, who is identified Nappinnai, a favourite gopi of Krishna. As Nappinnai, she is described as the daughter of Kumbagan, the brother of Yashoda. Krishna won her hand in marriage after subduing her father's seven ferocious bulls.

In Cherusseri Namboothiri's Krishnagatha, she is featured as one of Krishna's gopis.

Niladevi's aspect of Nappinnai is mainly limited to Tamilakam. The name Nappinnai is found in the Divya Prabandham of the Alvars and the Cilappatikaram. According to these texts, Andal (one of the Alvars) wanted to offer her devotion to her patron deity Krishna just as the Braj gopis did in the Dvapara Yuga. In her Tiruppavai, Andal wakes up Nappinai before waking up Krishna. As per Sri Vaishnavism, complete surrender to God is performed through his consort, and in the case of Krishna specifically, it is performed through Nappinai. Andal herself is sometimes considered by the Sri Vaishnava tradition as an aspect of Niladevi. S. M. Srinivasa Chari identifies Nappinnai in the Tiruppavai with Radha.

In the Vaikhanasa Agama texts, Vishnu's iccha shakti (will energy) manifests in three forms: Sridevi, Bhudevi, and Niladevi, representing the three gunas (qualities). The Sita Upanishad mentions that these three forms as those of goddess Sita, associating Niladevi with tamas, as well as the sun, the moon, and fire.

Niladevi is also described to be Vishnu's ahlāda-śakti, his energy of bliss.

== Iconography ==
According to a dhyana mantra of Vishnu, in his param (supreme) aspect, he is depicted seated on the serpent Shesha with Sridevi on his right, and Bhudevi and Niladevi on his left. Niladevi may be also depicted standing behind Vishnu with his two co-wives. In a depiction in the British Museum, Vishnu as Vaikunthanatha ("Lord of Vaikuntha") is seated on Shesha between Sridevi and Bhudevi, while his foot is supported by Niladevi.

== Temples ==
Thirunarayur Nambi Temple
