= Chengalvaraya Naicker =

Chengalvaraya Naicker (1825–1874) was a philanthropist also known as Sri P.T.Lee Chengalvaraya Naicker

== P.T.Lee Chengalvaraya Naicker ==
Naicker was born in Chennai in a Tamil Vanniyar (Vanniya kula Kshatriya) family and served as subedar major in the Madras Army. His Excellency in the service as Dubashi in Shand & Co showered on him with the prestigious honor ‘Lee’. But he died at the early age of 45. Before his demise, he bequeathed all his self earned properties and formed a "trust" with the main object of establishing Educational Institutions, a medical institution and an orphanage to carry out charitable activities for poor and downtrodden peoples. "P.T.Lee Chengalvaraya Naicker Trust" was functioning along with the Pachippa mudaliar Trust from 1874 to 9.10.96. From 10.10.96 onwards, the above said Trust is functioning independently as per the Supreme Court/High Court/Governing Orders.

== About the trust ==
Chengalvaraya Naicker owned a large number of movable and immovable properties, primarily in Chennai and Chengalpet. In 1870, he bequeathed his properties for religious and charitable purposes, in addition to uplift of the poor and deserving section of the community. After his death, the P T Lee Chengavaraya Naicker Trust was formed in 1874, and originally it was a part of another rich trust in the state, the Pachaiyappa Mudaliar Trust. After the valuable bequest was that of P.T. Lee Chengalvaraya Naicker. The Trustees established a regular Commercial School bearing the name of Chengalvaraya Naicker in 1866. The School owed a great deal to the exertions of Mr. John Adam, who may justly be called the pioneer of commercial and technical education in Southern India. In 1906 the Trustees developed the Chengalvaraya Naicker’s Orphanage into a fully equipped Industrial School. The Institute is now affiliated to the Technical Diploma Examination Board of Government of Tamil Nadu and is training students for the L.C.E., L.M.E., and L.E.E. Diplomas in addition to providing Certificate Courses in Electrical Engineering, electric Wiring Foreman, Mechanics, Fitting and other kindred subjects. The Government of India under the Second Five – Year Plan had given liberal aid to the Institution. A hostel had been constructed and was declared open by the Hon’ble Thiru M.a. Manickavelu Naicker, Minister of Madras in 1962 and a new block of buildings including the Jubilee Hall to house the classes was constructed and was declared open in 1962 by Dr. Rajah Sir. M.A. Muthiah Chettiar of Chettinad. A life size bronze statue of the founder P.T, Lee Chengalvaraya Naicker was unveiled by the Hon’ble Thiru K Kamaraj, Chief Minister of Madras in June 1963. A new building to accommodate the N.C.C, offices and the Free Dispensary was opened by Dr Rajah Sir. M. A. Muthiah Chettiar of Chettinad, on 20 February 1967. On 1 September 2006 Tamil Nadu Minister for Agriculture Veerapandy S. Arumugam paid rich tributes to Chengalvaraya Naicker for playing a stellar role in providing education to the masses to make them self-reliant. The minister, who unveiled a statue of Naicker on Anna Salai, appealed to the Chengalvaraya Naicker Trustees to educate people about the services Naicker had rendered.

=== Institutions ===
As per the ambition and intention of the Testator, the following institutions have been started and are functioning successfully till date.

- P.T.Lee Chengalvaraya Naicker College of Engineering and Technology, Oovery, Kancheepuram District.
- P.T.Lee Chengalvaraya Naicker Polytechnic College, Vepery, Chennai – 7
- P.T.Lee Chengalvaraya Naicker Industrial Training Institute, Oovery, Kancheepuram District.
- P.T.Lee Chengalvaraya Naicker Higher Secondary School, Chennai – 112.
- P.T.Lee Chengalvaraya Naicker Middle School, Oovery, Kancheepuram District,
- P.T.Lee Chengalvaraya Naicker Primary School, Choolai, Chennai – 112.
- P.T.Lee Chengalvaraya Naicker Orphanage and free Residential School, Vepery, Chennai.
- P.T.Lee Chengalvaraya Naicker Siddha Dispensary and Hospital, Vepery, Chennai -7.
- P.T.Lee Chengalvaraya Naicker Sidhha Dispensary and Allopathy Hospital, Oovery, Kancheepuram.
- P.T.Lee Chengalvaraya Naicker community literacy Centre, Oovery, Kancheepuram District.

=== Present ===
At present From 10.10.96 onwards, the Trust is functioning independently as per the Supreme Court/High Court/Governing Orders. As per the court order, it is being run and managed by a nine-member trust - while one trustee is from Chengalvaraya Naicker's family, the trust is now governed by Tamilnadu Public Properties Welfare Board.

== See also ==
- Kandasamy Kandar
- Malladi Satyalinga Naicker
- Arcot Dhanakoti Mudaliar
