= Pancha Kshethram =

Group of five Vishnu temples in South India

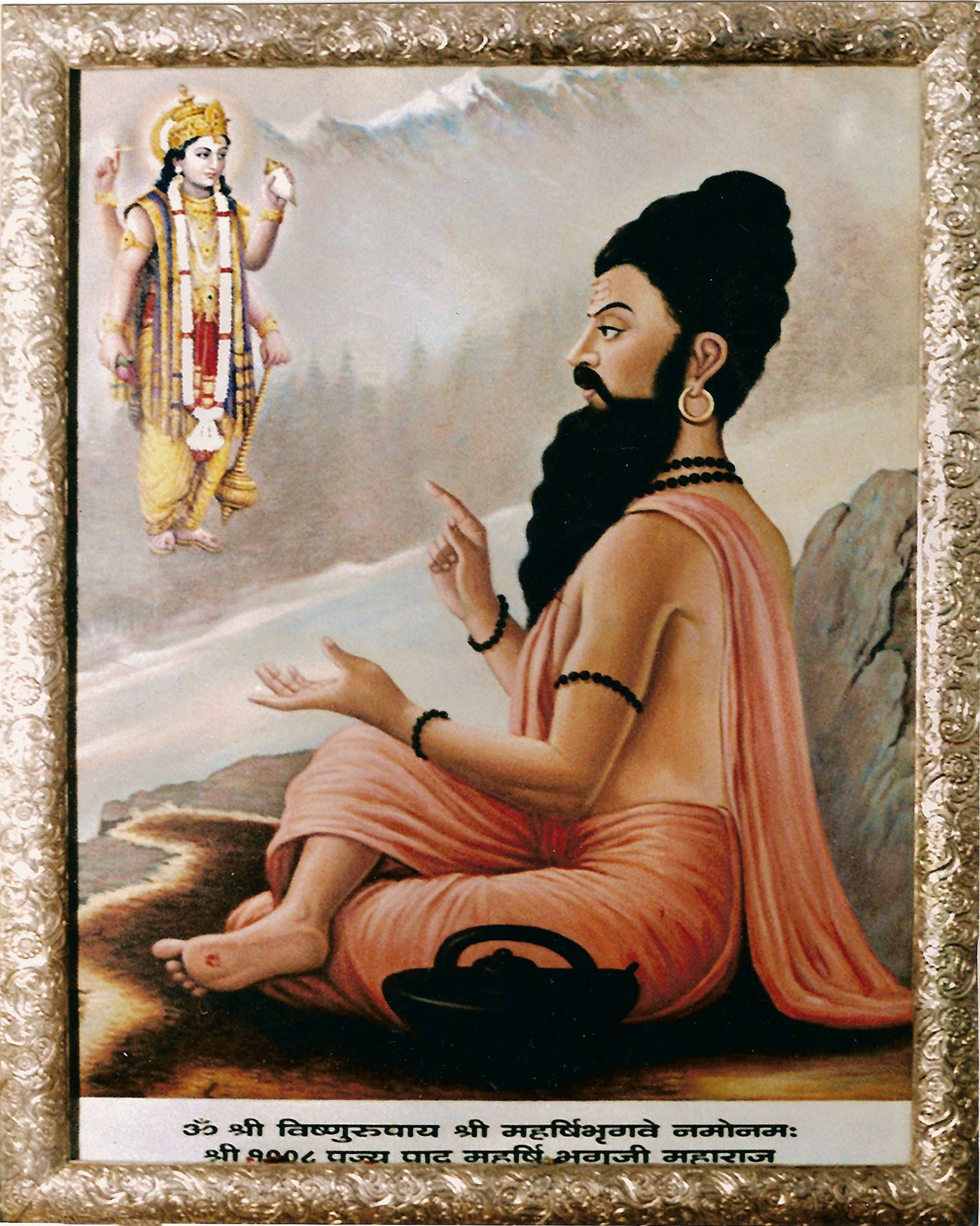
The maharishi Bhrigu

The Pancha Kshetram, (Sanskrit: पञ्च क्षेत्रम्, romanized: Pañca Kṣetram, lit. 'Five abodes/stages of Vishnu') or Pancha Bhargavi Kshethram, is a group of five Hindu temples in India which are dedicated to the deities Vishnu and Lakshmi (Bhargavi). Their legend is associated with the Venkateswara Temple, Tirumala. Four of the temples are Divya Desams, and one is an Abhimana Kshethram.

== Legend ==
During Kali Yuga, Narada advised sages who were performing a yagna (fire ritual) to decide who of the Trimurti (Brahma, Vishnu and Shiva) should receive its fruits. Bhrigu was sent to test the trinity. The sage, who had an extra eye in the sole of his foot, visited Brahma and Shiva without being noticed. He cursed Brahma to not be worshipped, and Shiva to be worshipped as a lingam. Bhrigu then visited Vishnu, who ignored him. Angry, Bhrigu kicked Vishnu in the chest; Vishnu apologised to the sage by massaging his feet, crushing the extra eye on the sole of Bhrigu's foot. Lakshmi considered the kick an insult, since Vishnu's chest was considered Lakshmi's residence. She left Vaikuntha, came to Earth at Kohlapura, and began meditating.

Vishnu took human form as Srinivasa, left Vaikuntha in search of Lakshmi, reached the Seshachalam Hills in Tirumala, and began meditating. Lakshmi learned about Srinivasa and called Shiva and Brahma, who became a cow and a calf. Lakshmi gave them to the Chola king ruling the Tirumala Hills; the cow would provide milk to Srinivasa daily while it was grazing. A cowherd in the king's household saw this, and tried to beat the cow with his staff; Srinivasa bore the injury, and struck down the cowherd. Angered by the cowherd's actions, Srinivasa made the Chola king an asura; sins committed by servants should be born by their employers. The king prayed for mercy; Srinivasa told him that he would be reborn as Akasharaja and should marry Srinivasa to his foster-daughter, Padmavati.

Srinivasa stayed with his foster-mother, Vakula Devi, on the Tirumala Hills. The Chola king was reborn as Akasharaja and had a foster-daughter, Padmavati (the human form of Lakshmi, who took this form in the Padmapushkarini, present-day Tiruchanur in Tirupati, Andhra Pradesh). Srinivasa married Padmavati in present-day Narayanavanam, and returned to the Tirumala Hills. After a few months, Srinivasa and Padmavati went to the seven Tirumala hills to emancipate humankind from the troubles of Kali Yuga. They became stone deities, expressing their wish to always be there.

Padmavati was still angry with Vishnu. Bhrigu sought an apology and asked Lakshmi to allow him to be born in four more places: Sundararaja Perumal Temple, Salem, as Bhrigu; Nachiyar Koil as Medhavi Maharishi; Oppiliappan Temple as Markandeya Maharishi, and Sarangapani Temple as Hema Maharishi.

== The five temples ==
Pancha Kshethram locations

Venkateswara Temple, Tirumala is run by Tirumala Tirupati Devasthanams (TTD), controlled by the Andhra Pradesh government. The other four temples, in Tamil Nadu, are maintained and administered by the Hindu Religious and Charitable Endowments Department of the government of Tamil Nadu. The deities are revered in the fifth-century Tamil Vaishnavate Divya Prabandham, written by the Alvars. The temples are classified as Divya Desam except for one, which is one of the 108 Abhimana Sthalam.

Temple	Photo	Location	Details
Venkateswara Temple, Tirumala	The temple, seen from a distance	Tirumala 13°40′59.7″N 79°20′49.9″E	Venkateswara Temple is in the hill town of Tirumala, at Tirupati in the Tirupati district of Andhra Pradesh. It is dedicated to Venkateswara, a form of Vishnu believed to have appeared on Earth to save humankind from Kali Yuga. The temple is also known as Kaliyuga Vaikuntha, Tirumala Temple, Tirupati Temple and Tirupati Balaji Temple. Venkateswara is also known as Balaji, Govinda, and Srinivasa.
Sundararaja Perumal Temple		Salem, 11.65°N 78.15°E	Sundararaja Perumal Temple, also known as Kottai Perumal Koil, is located on the Thirumanimutharu River. It has contributions from the medieval Cholas, Vijayanagara Empire, Chera, Pandyas and Madurai Nayaks. The temple follows the Vaikhanasa tradition and its priests belong to the Vadakalai sect of Vaishnavism, a Brahmin sub-caste.
Nachiyar Koil	Front of a newer-looking temple	Nachiyar Koil 10°55′N 79°26′E	Nachiyar Kovil (or Thirunarayur Nambi Temple) is in Thirunarayur, a village on the outskirts of Kumbakonam. The Dravidian temple is mentioned in the Divya Prabandham, the early-medieval Tamil verse collection from the Alvars. It is one of the 108 Divya Desam dedicated to Vishnu, who is worshipped as Srinivasa Perumal; his consort, Lakshmi, is worshiped as Nachiyar. The temple is where Vishnu is believed to have begun Pancha Samskara (religious initiation) for Thirumangai Alvar, and follows the Tenkalai tradition.
Oppiliappan Temple	Front of an older-looking temple	Thirunageswaram 10°57′41.63″N 79°25′53.73″E	The Dravidian Oppiliappan Temple is near Thirunageswaram, a village on the outskirts of Kumbakonam. It is the 60th of the 108 Divya Desams dedicated to Vishnu, who is worshiped as Oppiliappan; his consort, Lakshmi, is worshiped as Bhudevi. The temple is believed to have been begun by the medieval Cholas of the late 8th century CE, with later contributions from the Thanjavur Nayaks. It has two inscriptions dating to the Chola period, a five-tiered gopuram (gateway tower), and a granite wall.
Sarangapani Temple	Two large, Dravidian buildings	Kumbakonam 10°57′34″N 79°22′29″E	Sarangapani Temple, in Kumbakonam, is one of the Divya Desam: the 108 temples of Vishnu revered in Nalayira Divya Prabandham by the 12 poet-saints. On the Kaveri, it is one of the Pancharanga Kshetrams. The temple, believed to have had contributions from the medieval Cholas, the Vijayanagara Empire, and the Madurai Nayaks, is within a large granite wall. Its gopuram (main gateway) has eleven tiers and a height of 173 ft (53 m).
