= Arcot Dhanakoti Mudaliar =

Indian zamindar, philanthropist, and businessman

- Born: Arcot Dhanakoti Mudaliar; 1852
- Occupations: Businessman, Contractor

Rao Bahadur Dhanakoti Mudaliar or Arcot Dhanakoti Mudaliar was a Zamindar, Philanthropist, and Businessman at the Madras Presidency in the later 19th Century.

== Mudaliar ==
He was born in 1852 and belonged to an Influential landowning family based in the then North Arcot district. He ventured into Military and Railway Contracting, and grew as a Contracting Magnate in Madras City. He was also a Member of Madras Municipal Corporation in 1885. His nephew, A. Thangavelu Naicker, was also a contractor

== Philanthropy ==
He bequeathed his assets to many libraries and educational institutions. He donated to the Victoria Memorial for the purchase of books, which were housed in the Connemara Public Library, and also made several contributions to other causes.

== Other activities ==
Mudaliar was a member of the council in the Gyan Samaj, a carantic music Sabha, also considered as the mother of other Sabhas in Madras. He joined along with Sir Pitty Tyagaraya Chetty and he was also one of the first executives in the council of The Victoria Technical Institute.

== See also ==
- Chengalvaraya Naicker
- Kandasamy Kandar
