= Kammalar (caste) =

South Indian caste

- Religions: Hinduism, Christianity
- Languages: Tamil, Malayalam
- Subdivisions: Thachar; Karthachar; Thatar; Kollar; Kannar
- Related groups: Tamils, Sri Lankan Tamils

Kammalar is a Tamil caste group found in the Indian state of Tamil Nadu and in northeastern Sri Lanka. The Kammalars are involved in crafting. Kammalar is a generic term that comprises the communities of Kannar (brass-workers), Kollar (blacksmiths), Tatar (goldsmiths), Tatchar (carpenters) and Kartatchar (sculptors). Kammalars are classified and listed as Backward Class by both the central government of India and the State governments of Tamil Nadu and Kerala. They worship Vishvakarma and various forms of this deity.

== Etymology ==
The word Kammalar is derived from the Tamil word Kam meaning "art" or "operation". The Kammalar finds mention in ancient Sangam literature, mentioning them by the name Kammiyar. Their name is said to be derived from the phrase "one who gives the eyes", referring to their providing the eyes for statues of deities.

== Synonyms ==
=== Tamil Nadu and Sri Lanka ===
In Tamil Nadu, Tamil Achari is known as Tamil Kammalars. They are goldsmiths and landlords.

The Kammalar community in Nachiyar Koil town of Tamil Nadu are renowned for making the ornamental brass Nachiarkoil lamps.

== See also ==
- Caste system in India
- Caste system in Sri Lanka
