= Madappally, Kottayam =

Village in Kerala, India

Madappally Madappally Madappally
- Village
- Nickname: Madappally
- Location in Kerala, India
- Coordinates: 9°28′10″N 76°35′25″E
- Country: India
- State: Kerala
- District: Kottayam

Population (2011)
  - Total: 35,176

Languages
  - Official: Malayalam, English
- Time zone: UTC+5:30 (IST)
- PIN: 686546
- Telephone code: 0481
- Vehicle registration: KL-33
- Nearest city: Changanacherry
- Literacy: 99.98%
- Lok Sabha constituency: Mavelikkara
- Vidhan Sabha constituency: Changanacherry
- Climate: Moderate (Köppen)

Madappally is a village in Kottayam district in the state of Kerala, India. It is also the name of a block panjayath.

== Demographics ==
As of the 2011 Census of India, Madappally had a population of 35,176, with 17,158 males and 18,018 females.
