= Nachiarkoil lamp =

Type of Oil lamp found in India

- Geographical indication
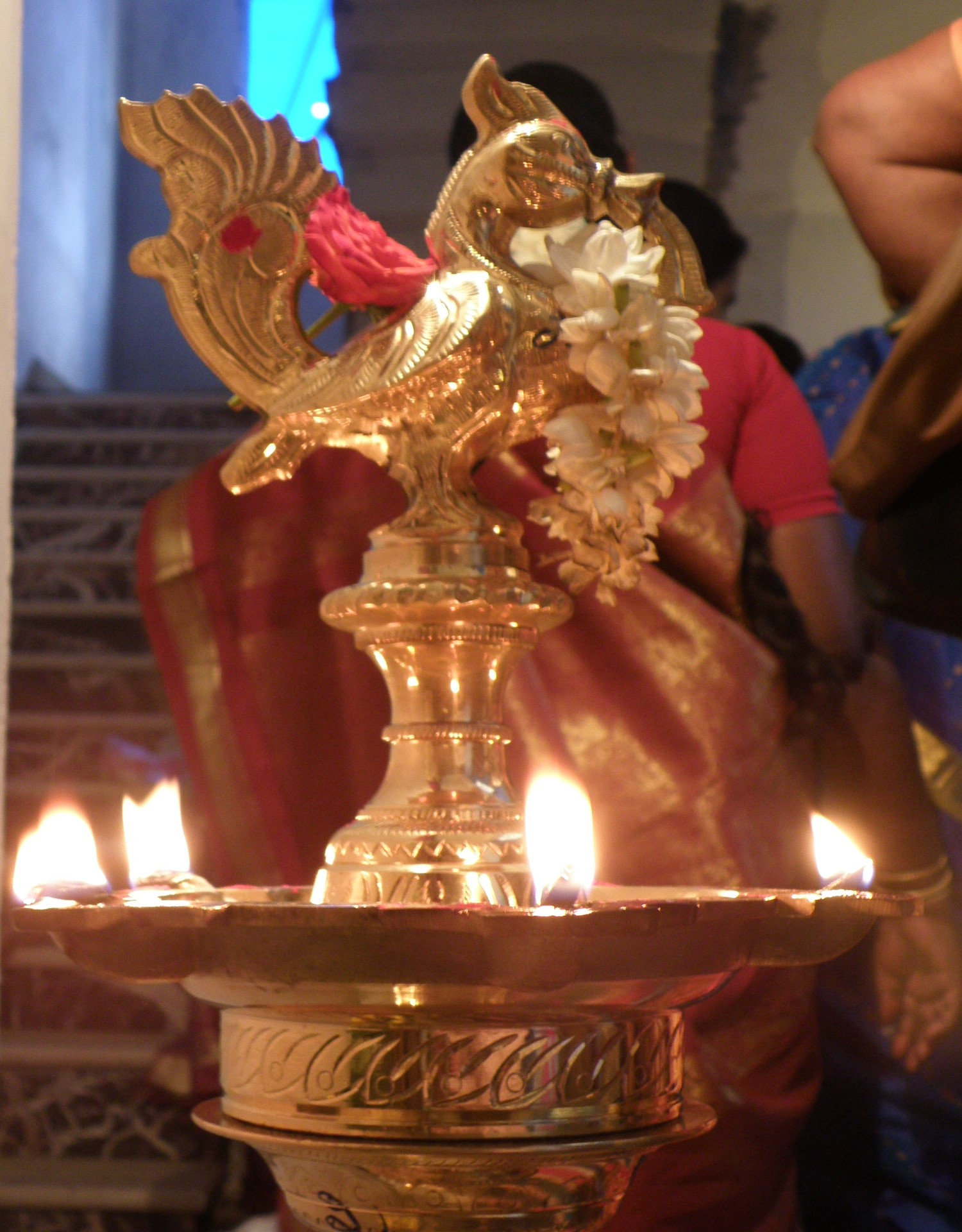
- Top of Nachiarkoil lamp
- Alternative names: Nachiarkoil Kuthuvilakku, Annam lamp, and Kammalar lamp
- Description: Handicraft (lamp)
- Type: Brass
- Area: Kammalar street in Nachiyar Koil of Tamil Nadu
- Country: India
- Registered: 8 February 2010
- Material: Brass

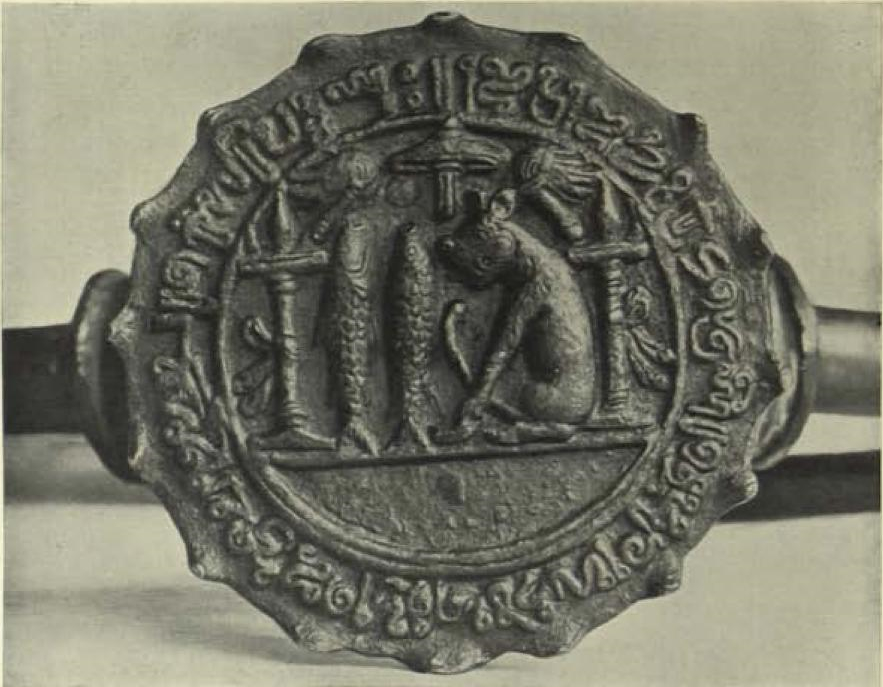
Seal of Chola Dynasty with two lamps, fish and tiger, 10th century

The Nachiarkoil lamp, also called Annam lamp or Nachiarkoil Kuthuvilakku, is an ornamental brass lamp made of series of diyas, a handicraft product which is exclusively made by Kammalar community in Natchiarkoil town in Tamil Nadu, India. The lamp, which is hollow cast, is made in different sizes and consists of four parts which are screwed together. The central pillar that crowns at the apex is called the "Prabhai"; it is generally in the form of a hamsa or swan. The lamp may also be made in the form of a female figurine holding a shallow bowl in a standing posture, or in the form of branches of a tree; the bowl of these lamps has five V-shaped spouts which hold cotton wicks, and is filled with oil for lighting. The ornamental lamps are widely used in temples in South India.

This product has been registered for protection under the Geographical indication of the Trade Related Intellectual Property Rights (TRIPS) agreement. On 8 February 2010 it was registered as "Nachiarkoil Kuthuvilakku (lamp)" under the Geographical Indications Act 1999 of the Government of India, with registration confirmed by the Controller General of Patents Designs and Trademarks under Class – 6 – Brass Lamps and related goods vide application number 196. A two-year training programme for student craftsmen is organised by the Tamil Nadu Handicrafts Development Corporation Ltd, known as Poompuhar, in Nachiarkoil.

== Location ==
Nachiarkoil Lamp is made in Nachiarkoil, a town in Kumbakonam taluk in the Tanjore district of Tamil Nadu. The town is about 6 miles (9.7 km) southeast of Kumbakonam on the Kumbakonam – Tiruvarur main road. The lamps are made by resident artisans called Pathers.

== History ==
The lamps were originally made in the Nachiarkoil by the particular community known as Pathers, who were practising this art form made of brass and bell metal originally in Nagercoil in the erstwhile Travancore-Cochin State, now Kerala. Since they could not pursue their livelihood in Nagerkoil with this craft, five families of Pathers migrated initially to Kumbakonam and then to Nachiarkoil in 1857. At Kumbakonam they had noted the local artisans manufacturing this product with brass sheets. As the Pathers were not aware of using sheets to manufacture handicrafts, they adopted it to their own craftsmanship in which they were proficient, of using a moulding brass and bell-metal technique using a particular type of sand. They settled at Nachiarkoil, as they found the light brown sand available in the nearby Cauvery river bed was exclusive and most suitable to mould their products. This sand is known as "vandal sand". The lamps are made by resident artisans called Pathers (Kammalar) who are living in large numbers at Kammalar street of Natchiyarkovil.

== Process ==
The Nachiarkoil lamp is made both in bell metal and brass; brass is more in vogue now since it is easily available and cheaper. The lamp has four components which are: parts—base "Keezhbagam (base plate), "kandam" meaning pivotal post, "Thanguli" a bowl with five groves to hold wicks and oil for lighting, and the "Prabhai" which is the crown. The lamps that are made in a standing form or a pedestal form are given the prefix of Nachiarkoil. Other forms of lamps are hung from the ceiling in temples or "deepams". These lamps are extensively ornamented.

The materials used to make the lamp are box-moulded, wax-moulded, or loam-moulded. These are made in an open space where fire hazards are of the least concern. To facilitate proper moulding, the key component materials used are: the brown vandal sand exclusively drawn from the Cauvery river bed about 1 km from the Nachiarkoil town used in all types of moulding; "Karuman sand" (used for wax moulding) of pale red colour, available in the town itself; "Savuttu sand", available in light grey colour, used in wax moulding and available in the tank beds in the vicinity of the town. The admixture used in box-moulding is clay powder in certain proportion depending on the type of moulding used. Other materials used are white dammar, a type of resin drawn from coniferous trees, and castor oil. Cow-dung cakes are the common type of fuel employed to melt the metal before it is poured into the moulds. Parting sand is used to facilitate easy removal of the moulded product. Box-moulding is used extensively as it is a quicker and cheaper mode of manufacture. Nowadays modern machinery is used to make the lamps.

== See also ==
- Other lamps
  - Butter lamp
  - Diya lamp
  - Nilavilakku lamp
  - Sky lantern
  - Types of Indian oil lamps
- Related topics
  - Aarti
  - Diwali
  - Rangoli
  - List of light sources
