= Malladi Satyalingam Naicker =

Indian philanthropist and educationalist (1840–1915)

- మల్లాడి సత్యలింగం నాయకర్
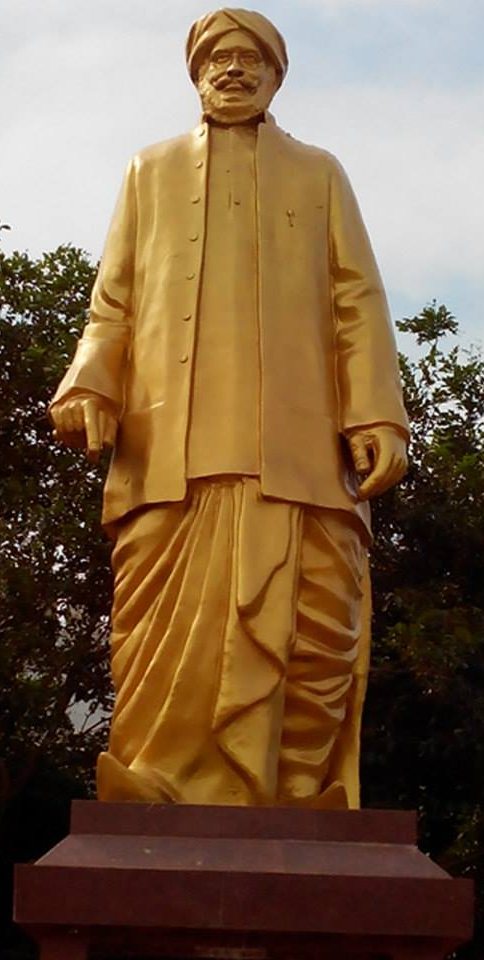
- Bronze statue of Malladi Satyalingam Naicker
- Born: 1840; Korangi, East Godavari, Madras Presidency (now in Andhra Pradesh)
- Died: 1915 (aged c. 75); Rangoon, British Burma (now Yangon, Myanmar)
- Occupations: Philanthropist, educationalist
- Known for: Founder of M.S.N. Charities

Malladi Satyalingam Naicker (1840–1915) was an Indian philanthropist and educationalist from Kakinada, Andhra Pradesh. He is known for founding the M. S. N. Charities and his contributions to education, public welfare, and religious causes. His charitable efforts significantly benefited underprivileged students and the local community.

== Early life and career ==
Malladi Satyalingam Naicker was born in 1840 in Korangi, East Godavari. In 1868, he moved to Rangoon (modern-day Yangon), where he began as a labourer before establishing himself as a businessman in shipping and trade.

Naicker battled poverty and faced the challenges in his early life. His independent and progressive views often clashed with the authoritarian practices of the wealthy kalasis aboard the boats. Seeking a better livelihood, he left his uncle's cargo boat for Rangoon, where he changed jobs several times, eventually becoming a contractor for the supply of workers to British rice mills and naval yards. Naicker amassed considerable wealth, which he later dedicated to charitable causes.

== Philanthropy ==
=== Establishment of M. S. N. Charities ===
In 1912, Naicker registered a will in the district court of Rangoon, setting aside ₹8 lakh from his wealth for various philanthropic activities. His will stipulated that the funds be used for the establishment and maintenance of educational institutions, temples, and welfare initiatives, including providing scholarships for poor students and feeding the needy.

Following his will, prominent figures such as Diwan Bahadur D. Seshagiri Rao Pantulu and Naicker's adopted son Subrahmanyam Naicker formed M. S. N. Charities in 1915. The organization was entrusted with managing these funds and implementing the charitable activities specified in the will.

=== Contributions to education ===
A school focused on technical subjects and vocational training was established in 1927. The trust also donated land for the establishment of an industrial school (polytechnic) in 1945 and supported the creation of a junior college and degree colleges in the 1960s and 1970s.

One of the significant contributions of M.S.N. Charities was the establishment of educational institutions in Kakinada. In 1915, ₹5 lakh was allocated for the purchase of agricultural lands, ₹2 lakh was deposited in banks, and ₹1 lakh was used for constructing schools, temples, and a guest house. These institutions provided free education and meals to underprivileged students.

By 1946, the charity had established an upper secondary school, and by 1954, it had opened a Vedic school. The organization also helped establish the Andhra Polytechnic in 1946 and later a junior college and a degree college in the late 1960s and early 1970s.

=== Religious contributions ===
Naicker's will also supported the construction of religious institutions. Several temples were built in Chollangi, including a Shiva temple, a Rama and Hanuman temple, and resting places for pilgrims.

=== Notable beneficiaries ===
Over the years, M. S. N. Charities has assisted many students in pursuing higher education, both in India and abroad. Among the notable beneficiaries was Yellapragada Subbarow, the renowned scientist who received financial support to study abroad. Other prominent personalities who received support include Maganti Bapineedu and Dr. Lanka Sundaram.

== Legacy ==
Malladi Satyalingam Naicker's charitable legacy continues through the operations of M. S. N. Charities, which remains active in providing education and welfare services. His contributions have had a lasting impact on the social and educational landscape of Kakinada and its surrounding regions. A lesson highlighting the nobility of character and generosity of Satyalingam has been prescribed for ninth class pupils by the Education Department of Andhra Pradesh.
