= Vanniyar =

Hindu agrarian caste in Tamil Nadu, India

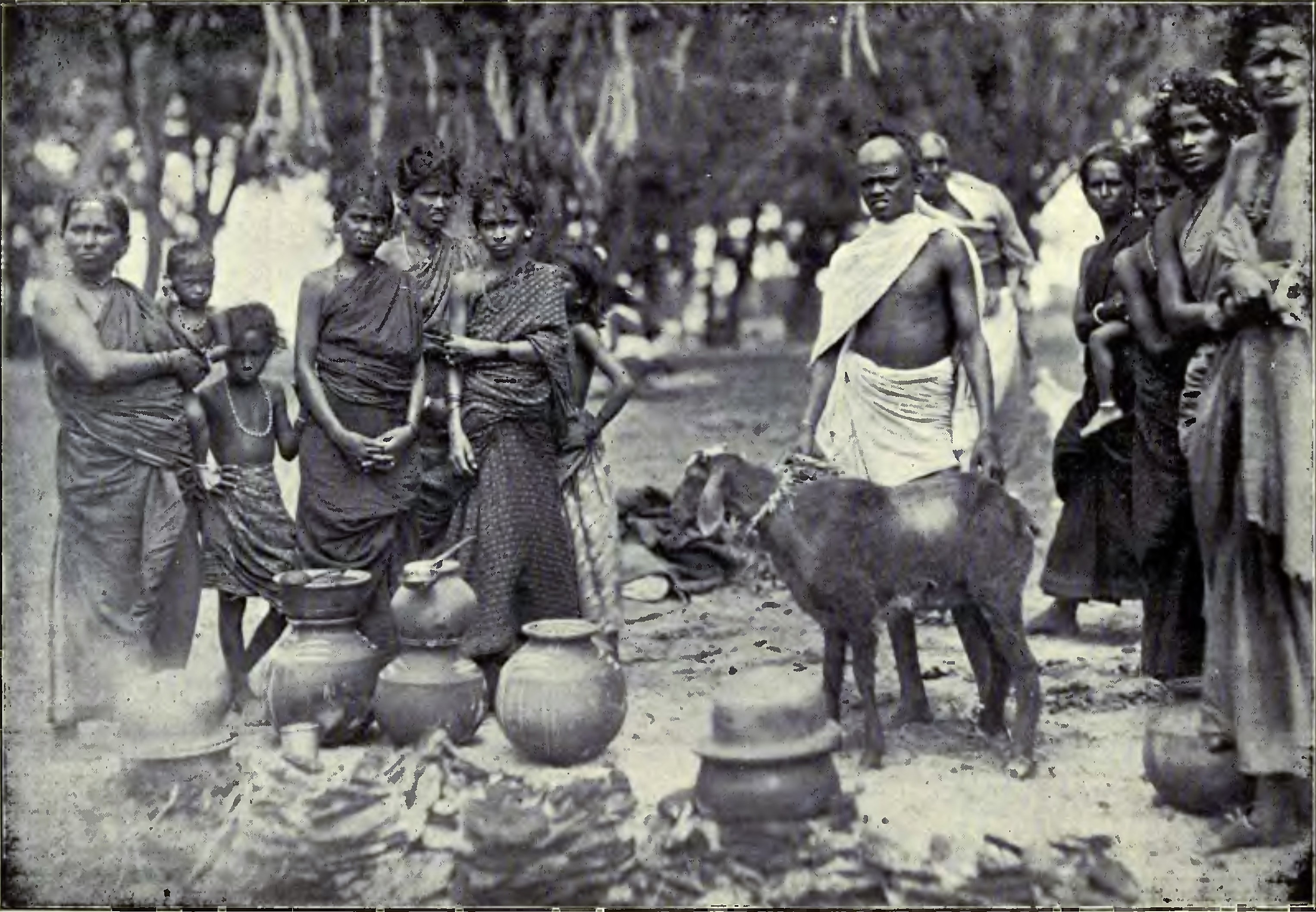
Vanniyars celebrating Pongal, 1909

The Vanniyar, formerly known as the Palli, are a community or jāti found in the northern part of the Indian state of Tamil Nadu.

The Vanniyars were historically considered a lower caste, although some were peasant-warriors in the 14th century. The Palli, along with the Paraiyar, were largely employed as agricultural labourers during British rule, although some were smallholders and minor landowners. They have been trying to gain a higher socio-religious standing since the 19th century, using the Sanskritisation process to promote a myth of origin that they are related to the ancient Agnikula deity, born from the flames of a fire sacrifice.

== Etymology ==
Several etymologies for Vanniyar have been suggested. Alf Hiltebeitel suggests that the caste name derives from vahni, a Sanskrit word thought to be the root for the Tamil word vanni (fire), which is also a Tamil name for an important tree. The connection to the sage (Jambumuni) leads to further associations with mythological legends.

Other etymologies include derivation from the Dravidian val ("strength"), or the Sanskrit or Pali vana ("forest"). The term Palli is widely used to describe them, but is considered to be derogatory.

== Historical status ==
Hiltebeitel, who classifies the Vanniyar as Shudra in the Hindu varna system, notes that South Indian society traditionally recognised neither the Kshatriya (warrior) nor Vaishya (merchant) varnas, being divided instead between Brahmins on the one hand and Shudras and untouchables on the other. Nonetheless, communities in the region frequently sought to prove a historic higher status, based on myth or occasionally probable history. He notes that "traditions of demotion from a once higher rank are a commonplace of South Indian caste mythologies".

Burton Stein is one of several writers who have described the Vanniyars as "peasant-warriors" in the 14th century, by which time they had risen to "local prominence" in some areas as the Sambuvaraya chiefs. Researchers Lloyd and Susanne Rudolph note that as early as in 1833, the Vanniyar had ceased to accept their "low caste" status, also described as being Shudra by Kathleen Gough and others. Gough, however, documenting her fieldwork of 1951–53, records the Palli and the Vanniyar as separate but similar cultivating castes. (Note: Aside from distinguishing the Palli and Vanniyar, Gough also distinguishes the Padaiyacchi cultivating caste, which other scholars consider to be a synonym for Vanniyar.) Regarding Pallis of Pondicherry, J. B. Prashant More noted, "they seem to take pleasure in considering themselves as belonging to higher castes, though they have been classified traditionally among the eighteen lower castes."

== Sanskritisation movement ==
The Pallis tried to get an order in Pondicherry that by descent they were not a low agricultural caste. In preparation for the 1871 Indian census they petitioned to be recognised as being of the Kshatriya varna. They formed a number of caste organisations using their preferred name, with the Vanniyakula Kshatriya Maha Sangam appearing in Madras in 1888 and extending state-wide in 1952. During the late 19th century, oral histories began to assert the Vanniyars' descent from the mythical "fire races", whom Kshatriyas often claimed as ancestors. The creation of new names such as Agnikula Kshatriya and Vannikula Kshatriya (Kshatriyas of the fire race) formed part of this process. By 1931, due to their successful politicking (a process known as Sanskritisation), the term Palli was removed from the Madras census, with the term Vanniya Kula Kshatriya appearing instead. The reinvention of their history through Sanskritisation, and thus the change in their status implicit in being called Vanniyar rather than Palli, was evidenced in the community adopting such practices as vegetarianism and prohibiting the remarriage of widows, and what Rudolph terms a "radically revisionist history" was supported by claims of descent from the ancient Pallava dynasty.

According to Hiltebeitel, whilst the mythological claims of origin from the fire lend credence to their demand for being deemed as Kshatriyas, the claims to military origins and Kshatriya identity did not solely rely on myths. He notes that they had historically adopted various titles and terms that signified a self-image of Kshatriya status, including the Vanniyar name itself, and that

beyond linguistic indicators ... The Vanniyars' Kshatriya claims are rooted in their history. There is, to begin with, no reason to discount the ... traditions that Vanniyars formed an important part of the Pallava soldiery. And after the Pallava period there is increasing evidence of Vanniyars assuming "Kshatriya" roles and activities.

The caste has also been significant in the practices relating to worship of Draupaudi Amman, together with the Konars and Vellalar Mudaliars, and quite possibly were the instigators of it, with the other two communities being later adopters. The Vanniyar practice of polyandry was perhaps related to their adoption of the cult.

In addition to domestic slavery, there were a number of agricultural labour relationships. According to Ravi Ahuja, Paraiyar or Vanniyar farmhands sometimes called pannaiyals were collectively bound to their home village soil. Vanniyar mobility was severely restricted but the powers exercised by their masters were also limited – such slaves could not be expelled or transferred to another village, even if the masters left the region themselves. Dharma Kumar argues that the term slavery does not adequately describe the many forms of bondage existing within the traditional agrarian society. Caste involved a number of slavery-like criteria, such as restriction of freedom, forced labour and ownership.

== Current status ==
Rudolph noted that, although "necessarily tentative" because of being based on figures from the 1931 census, the Vanniyars in the 1980s constituted around 10% of the population of Tamil Nadu, being particularly prevalent in the northernmost districts of Chingelput, North Arcot, South Arcot and Salem, where they formed around 25% of the population. Vanniyar/Palli constituted 30% of the population of Pondicherry in the nineteenth century.

Most Vanniyars remain either marginal farmers cultivating small areas of land or landless labourers. However, it was reported in 2003 that they were being hurt significantly by the rising debt crisis engulfing Tamil Nadu agriculture, and many now worked as day labourers in Bengaluru and Chennai.

Due to their population size and concentration, the Vanniyars wield significant political clout in northern Tamil Nadu. The Pattali Makkal Katchi (PMK) is a political party formed by S. Ramadoss from the Vanniyar Sangam, a caste association. It has been known on occasion for its violent protests against Dalits and draws its support base from Vanniyars. The Vanniyars, who previously were of the Backward Class category, were re-designated as a Most Backward Caste after successful agitations by them in the 1980s intended to unlock more favourable education and employment entitlements from the state government under its reservation system. In 2020, the PMK launched an agitation to obtain a 20% reservation entitlement for Vanniyars and forced the Tamil Nadu government to institute a caste census.

== Notable people ==
- S. S. Ramasami Padayatchiyar, a politician and founder of Tamil Nadu Toilers' Party
- Nagappan Padayatchi, an Indian South African Satyagraha martyr
- Vazhappady K. Ramamurthy, politician and founder of Tamizhaga Rajiv Congress
- Chengalvaraya Naicker, a philanthropist
- M. A. Manickavelu Naicker, politician of the INC and founder of Commonweal Party
- Radhakrishna Padayachi, a South African cabinet minister and activist
- Anbumani Ramadoss, politician and former Union Minister of Health and Family Welfare
- N. Rangaswamy, Chief Minister of the Union Territory of Puducherry
- Kaduvetti Guru, politician and President of Vanniyar Sangam
- Veerappan, bandit turned domestic terrorist
