= M. S. N. Charities =

M.S.N. Charities is a charitable organisation established at East Godavari District of Andhra Pradesh, India, in 1915, from the will of Malladi Satyalingam Naicker, who died on 29 January 1915.

== Malladi Satyalingam Naicker ==
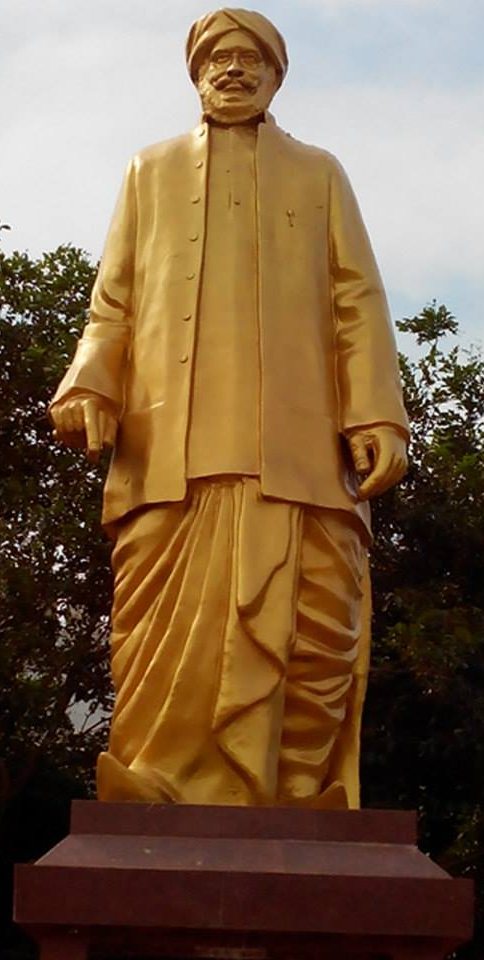
The Bronze statue of founder of MSN Charities Sri Malladi Satyalingam Naicker

Malladi Satyalingam Naicker belongs to the Agnikula kshatriya(Palli Kapu/Palli Reddi, Pallava) Community. He was born in Coringa, a small village near Kakinada about 1843.

Satyalingam Naicker died in Rangoon on 29 January 1915 when he was about 75 years old.
