= J. B. Prashant More =

French historian (born 1955)

Jean-Baptiste Prashant More
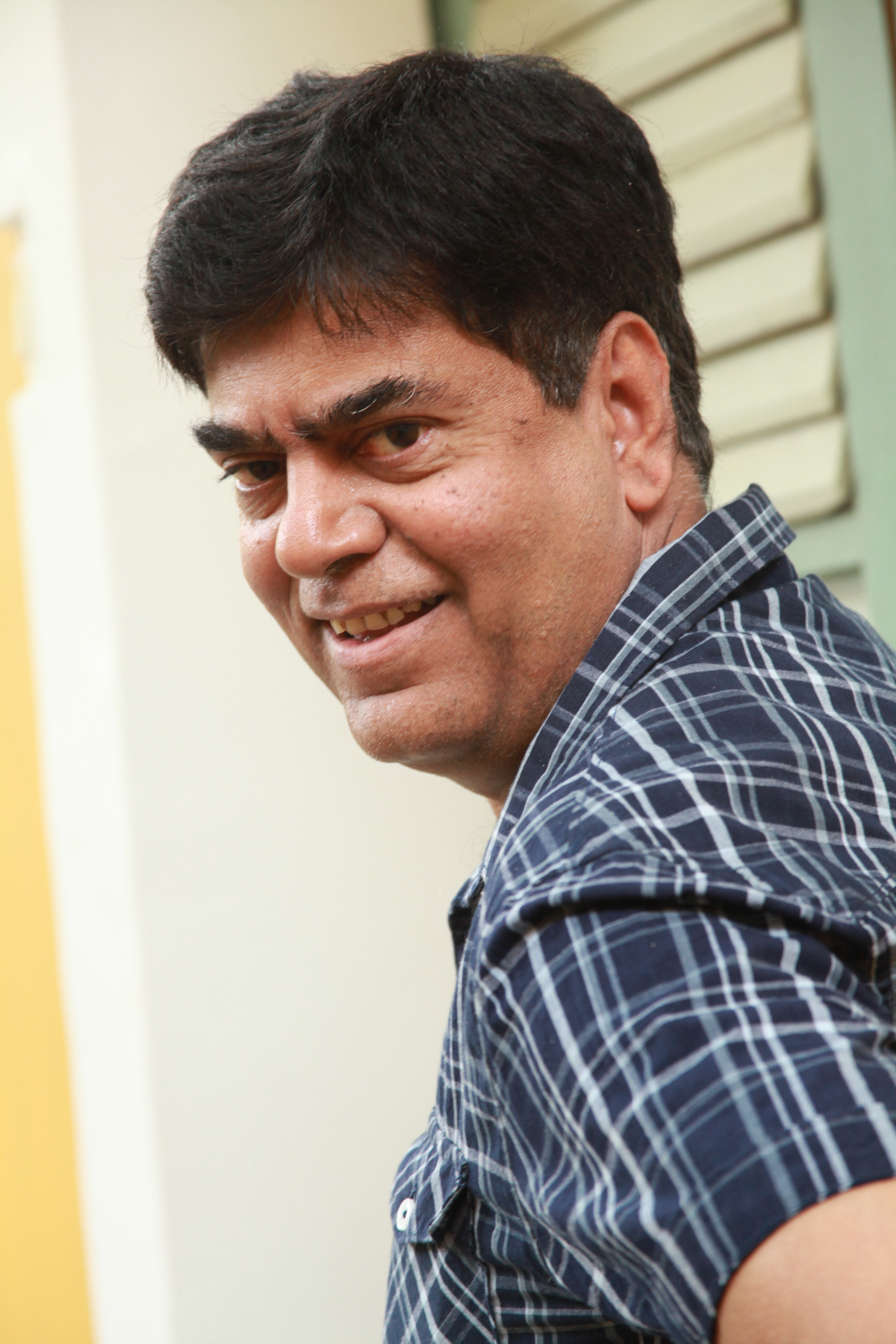
- More in 2013
- Born: August 28, 1955 (age 70); Pondicherry, French India

Academic background
- Education: School for Advanced Studies in the Social Sciences (PhD)

Academic work
- Discipline: History
- Website: jbprashantmore.in

Jean-Baptiste Prashant More is a French historian, author, and teacher. He specializes in South Indian history.

== Personal life ==
Prashant More was born in Pondicherry and did his schooling there. He moved to Paris to pursue Bachelor of Arts and later obtained PhD from the School for Advanced Studies in the Social Sciences.

== Authored Books ==
- More, J.B.P. (1997). The Political Evolution of Muslims in Tamil Nadu and Madras, 1930-1947. Orient Blackswan. ISBN 978-8-125-01192-7.
- More, J.B.P. (2001). Freedom Movement in French India, The Mahe Revolt of 1948. Kannur: Institute for Research in Social Sciences and Humanities of MESHAR. ISBN 978-8-190-01669-8.
- More, J.B.P. (2003). L’Inde face à Bharati, le Poète rebelle (in French). Kannur: Institute for Research in Social Sciences and Humanities of MESHAR. ISBN 978-8-188-43206-6.
- More, J.B.P. (2004). Muslim identity, Print Culture and the Dravidian factor in India in Tamilnadu. Hyderabad: Orient Longman. ISBN 978-8-125-02632-7.
- More, J.B.P. (2006). Religion and Society in South India: Hindus, Muslims and Christians. Kannur: Institute for Research in Social Sciences and Humanities of MESHAR. ISBN 978-8-188-43212-7.
- More, J.B.P. (2007). The Telugus of Yanam and Masulipatnam : From French rule to Integration With India. Kannur: Institute for Research in Social Sciences and Humanities of MESHAR.
- More, J.B.P. (2008). Partition of India: Players and Partners. Kannur: Institute for Research in Social Sciences and Humanities of MESHAR. ISBN 978-8-188-43215-8.
- More, J.B.P. (2009). Rise and Fall of the Dravidian Justice party, 1916-1946. Kannur: Institute for Research in Social Sciences and Humanities of MESHAR.
- More, J.B.P. (2011). Putuccēri vaḷartta Pāratiyār (in Tamil). Pondicherry: Tiyāki Leyōn̲ Puruṣānti Nin̲aivu Caṅkam. ISBN 978-9-380-32582-8.
- More, J.B.P. (2012). Origin and Early History of the Muslims of Keralam, 700-1600, A.D. Kozhikode: Other Books. ISBN 978-9-380-08119-9.
- More, J.B.P. (2013). Indian Steamship Ventures 1836-1910. Darmanathan Prouchandy of Pondicherry, First Steam Navigator from South India, 1891-1900. Pondicherry.
- More, J.B.P. (2013). Keralathile Muslimkal: Aavirbhavavum Adyakaala Charitravum (700 AD- 1600 AD) (in Malayalam). Calicut: Lead Books.
- More, J.B.P. (2014). From Arikamedu to the Foundation of Modern Pondicherry. Chennai: Saindhavi Publication. ISBN 978-8-192-76392-7.
- More, J.B.P. (2014). Origin and Foundation of Madras. Chennai: Saindhavi Publication. ISBN 978-8-192-76394-1. Archived from the original on 17 November 2015.
- More, J.B.P. (2015). Offerings to the Muslim Warriors of Malabar: Foundation Document of Colonialism and Clash of Civilisations. Chennai: Saindhavi Publication. ISBN 978-8-192-76395-8.
- More, J.B.P. (2016). Tamil Heroes of French India: Their Role in Business, Social Reforms and in Netaji's Freedom Struggle from Vietnam. Puducherry: TLPMS & Ilakkiya Publications. ISBN 978-8-192-08561-6.
- More, J.B.P. (2016). A Critique of Modern Civilization and Thought: Facts, Non-Facts and Ideas. Puducherry: TLPMS & Ilakkiya Publications. ISBN 978-8-192-08562-3.
- More, J.B.P. (2016). Dravida Needhi Katchiyin Valarchiyum Veezhchiyum (1916-1946) (in Tamil). Chennai: Samaran Publishers.
