= Manappalli =

- village
- Location in Tamil Nadu, India Manappalli (India)
- Coordinates: 11°5′7″N 78°6′5″E
- Country: India
- State: Tamil Nadu
- District: Namakkal

Languages
  - Official: Tamil
- Time zone: UTC+5:30 (IST)

Manapalli is a small village on the northern bank of the Cauvery River in the Namakkal district of Tamil Nadu, India. Over 5000 people live in this village, which includes Manapalli, GanapathiPalayam, Rasagounden Pudur, Ramanaicken Palyam, Ellaikattuputhur, Kunnipalayam, Theerthampalayam, Aruvankattur, Ganeshapuram, Chennakkal Pudur (bordering the Mohanur sugar factory), and MelaPettapalayam. The village is composed of mostly Hindus.

== Temples ==
- Beemeeswarar Temple (Manappalli)
- Varadharaja Perumal Temple (Manapalli)
- Chokkanayaki Amman Temple (Manappalli)
- Muniyandi Temple (Manappalli)
- Sri Vel Vinayakar Temple (Manappalli)
- Ganapathi Vinayagar Temple (Ganapathipalayam)
- Mariamman Temple (Eramanaikan Palayam)
- Bhagavathi Amman Temple (Ellaikaatuputhur)
- Throwbathi Amman Temple (Kunnipalayam)
- Mariamman Temple (Theertham Palyam)
- Vinayagar Temple (Ganeshapuram)
- Kannimar Kovil (Theerthampalayam)
- Vinayagarkovil (Theerthampalayam)
- Muthayammal Temple (Mela Pettapalayam)
- Santhiyappan Temple (Mela petapalayam)

Rajaganapathi Temple (Manappalli)

== Schools ==
- Middle school in Manappalli
- Primary school in Kunnipalyam
- Primary school in Theertham Palyam
- Primary school in Melapettapalyam

== Nearby Towns ==
- Mohanur (east 6 km)
- Velur (west 11 km)
- Namakkal (north 25 km)
- Tiruchirappalli (east 80 km).

== Transportation ==
The village can be reached by bus route from Tiruchirappalli (via Musiri, Thottiam, Kattuputhur, or Mohanur), from Salem (via Namakkal or Mohanur), or from Karur (via Velur).

== Health Centres ==
Only one government-sponsored primary health center exists in Manapalli.

== Economy ==
Manapalli's economy is fully agricultural.

== Celebrities ==
- Late Sivasubramaniyam, son in law of Bharathidasan.
- Captain Palanisamy who expired in the 1971 war.
- Sivashanmugam, a famous writer, and the author of Arththaviyal (அர்த்தவியல்).
- Veeramani, the grandson of Bharathidasan, a famous astrologer.
