= Natchiarkoil =

- Village
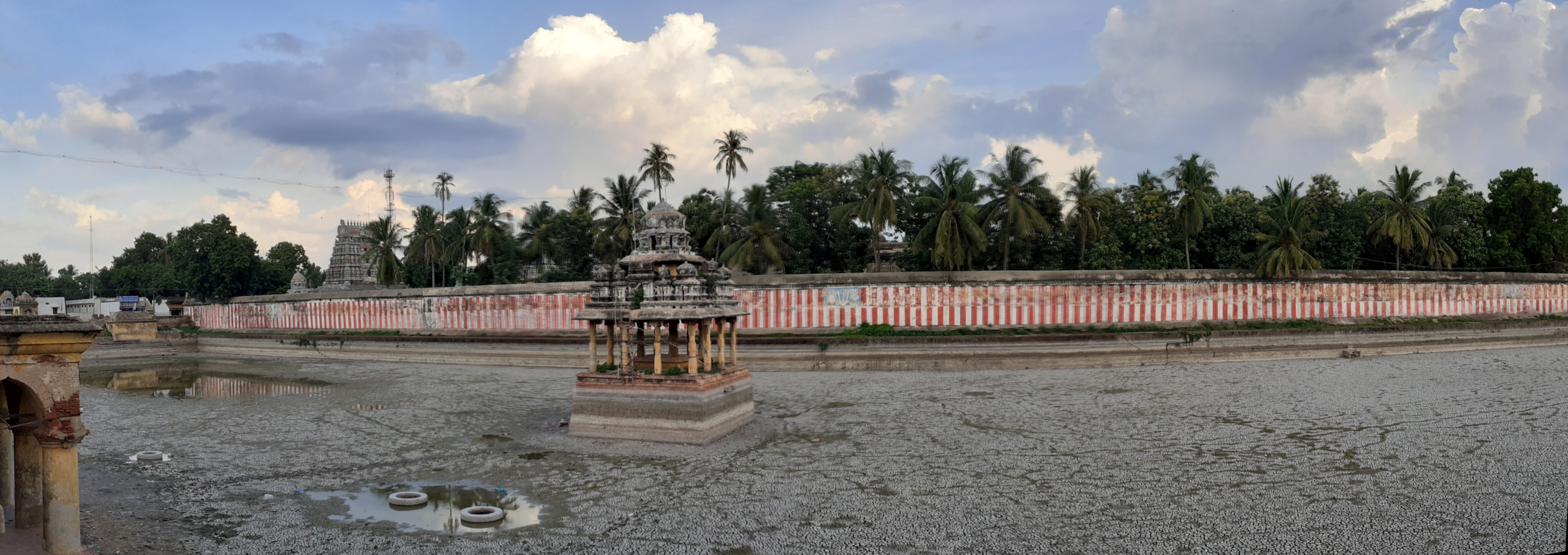
- Srinivasa Perumal Temple in Natchiarkoil
- Interactive map of Natchiarkoil
- Coordinates: 10.9177°N 79.4455°E
- Country: India
- State: Tamil Nadu
- District: Thanjavur

Government
  - Type: Village Panchayat
- Elevation: 46.79 m (153.5 ft)

Languages
  - Official: Tamil
  - Speech: Tamil
- Time zone: UTC+5:30 (IST)
- LS: Mayiladuthurai
- VS: Thiruvidaimarudur

Natchiarkoil (also written as Nachiar/Nachiyar Koil or Kovil) is a village located in the Kumbakonam taluk of Thanjavur district, in the Indian state of Tamil Nadu. The settlement is administred by a village panchayat included in the Thiruvidaimarudur block. Nachiarkoil lamps, which are made of brass, are produced locally.

== Location ==
Natchiarkoil is about 46.79 metres (153.5 ft) above sea level with the geographic coordinates of (10.9177°N 79.4455°E) in Kumbakonam taluk.

Natchiarkoil (Tamil Nadu)

== Population ==
As of 2011 census of India, the population of Natchiarkoil was 7,505.

== Religion ==
Thirunarayur Nambi Temple, one of the 108 Divyadesams, is in Natchiarkoil.

== Politics ==
Natchiarkoil comes under Thiruvidaimarudur state assembly constituency and Mayiladuthurai Parliamentary constituency.
