= List of Sengunthars =

This is a list of notable people of the Sengunthar or Kaikkolar . The Warriors and Textile merchants, Weavers found in the Indian state of Tamil Nadu, Andhra Pradesh, Pondicherry and in Sri Lanka.

== Historical Personalities and Chieftains ==
- Veerabaahu: commander-in-chief of Lord Murugan's army.
- Ottakoothar 12th century court poet and minister of Cholas under Vikrama Chola, Kulothunga Chola II, Raja Raja Chola II reign. He is known as Kavichakravarthy.
- Paranjothi: popularly known as Sirruthondar was an army general of the great Pallava king Narasimhavarman I who ruled South India from 630 to 668 CE. He also led the Pallava army during the invasion of Vatapi in 642 CE.
- Chandramathi Mudaliar: was a 17th-century Tamil chieftain and ruler of south Kongu Nadu (Erode region) who fought many battles against the Madurai Nayaks. Erode Fort was built by him.
- Kaikolar Andar Magan Pokkaran Pandiyatharaiyan: was a prominent chieftain in the region of Thiruchanur near Tirupati during the 13th century, under the reign of Rajaraja Chola III.
- Kottaiyannan Mudaliar: was a 14th-century chieftain who was ruling Kongu region and fought against Muslim invaders.
- Chinnan Mudaliyar: Chieftain of Rasipuram in 16th century. He renovated many temples. He constructed a mandapam in Tiruchengode Ardhanareeswarar temple. People call him as Rasipuram Chinna Mudaliyar.
- Veera Chola Muniyappa Mudaliar: Chieftain of Virinchipuram during Vijayanagar period.
- Chieftains During Medieval Chola Period: Following is the list of Sengunthar chieftains under Imperial Cholas taken from the poem "Eeti Ezhubathu" written by Ottakoothar,
- Putridan Kondan: King of Kalattur. Pallikondan: Chieftain of Chidambaram. Pazhuvur Veeran and Pazhuvur Narayanan: Chieftains of Pazhuvur. Thaniyan: Chieftain of Kanchi. Otriyuran: Chieftain of Thiruvottriyur. Thanjai Vemban: Chieftain of Thiruvaiyaru and chief minister under Parantaka Chola I's reign. Kangeyan: ruled Tondaimandalam under Kulothunga Chola II. Kalanthaiyarasan Mudaliar: son of Ponvilaintha kalathur king Madhimaan. Puliyur Palli Kondaan: son of Chidambaram king Vidangan. Pinavan Mudaliar: son of Kadambur king Kadhamban. Kandiyuran; son of Thiru kandiyur king Vibulan. Suban Mudaliar: Chieftain of Thiruchendur and commander under Rajadhiraja Chola I. Padaimaruthan: Chieftain of Thiruvidai maruthur.

== Zamindars and Mirasdar ==
- S. Sivaraj Mudaliyar: Mirasdar from Tirukovilur whose family holds thousands of acre cultivatable land in that area. He won 4 times as MLA from Rishivandyam constituency.
- T. M. Jambulingam Mudaliar: Mirasdar of Thirukandeeswaram, Cuddalore district, who hold 1,200 acre cultivatable land. NLC India Limited founder Rao Bahadur T. M. Jambulingam Mudaliar is son of Maasillamani Mudaliar.
- Nanjai Uthukuli: Last Zamindar of Nanjai Uthukuli, Erode district. 1,600 acre zamin estate.
- Ranganatha Mudaliyar: Zamindar in Thiruvannamalai who ruled around 16,000 acres and the first one to build a hospital at Thiruvannamalai.
- Raya Savarimuthu Chola Pandya Mudaliyar: Zamindar in Dindugul. His ancestors served as commanders in Chola Empire.
- A.R Chellappa Mudaliyar: Zamindar of Takkolam.
- P.S. Thuraiyappa Mudaliar: Last Mirasdar of Puthukaiputhur, Erode district. His family has hold 1300 acre cultivatable land in Gobi taluka.
- A.G. Murugesa Mudaliar: Last Mirasdar of Variyankaval, Ariyalur district. His family has hold 450 acre cultivatable land in Andimadam taluk.

== Independence activists ==
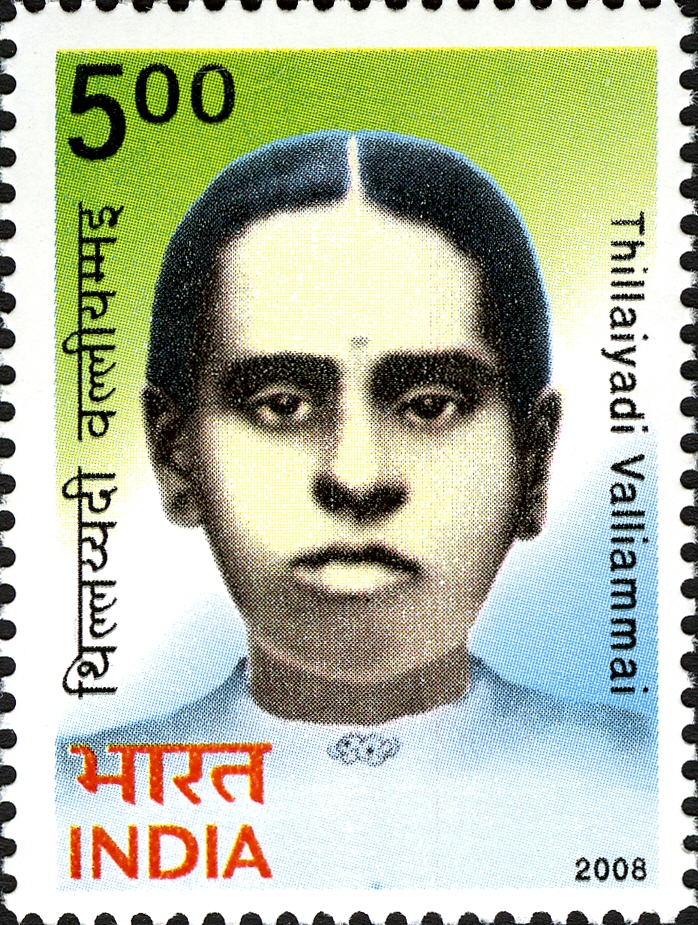
Thillaiaadi Valliammai on a 2008 stamp of India

- Tirupur Kumaran: Freedom fighter from Chennimalai who lost his life for saving Indian national flag. He founded Desa Bandhu Youth Association and led protests against the British. His birth name was OKSR. Kumaraswamy Mudaliar.
- Thillaiaadi Valliammai, was a South African Tamil woman who worked with Mahatma Gandhi in her early years when she developed her nonviolent methods in South Africa fighting its apartheid regime and sacrificed her life in prison.

== Business ==
- A. Kulandaivel Mudaliar, Founder of The Chennai Silks, Sri Kumaran Thanamaligai and SCM Group. Hailed from Pattaliyar Gothram.
- S. Muthusamy Mudaliar: was a Textile merchant and businessman from Erode district. Along with his father he was the founder of the Nilgiris Supermarket in 1905. It is also one of the oldest supermarket chains in India with origins dating back to 1905.

== Philanthropy ==
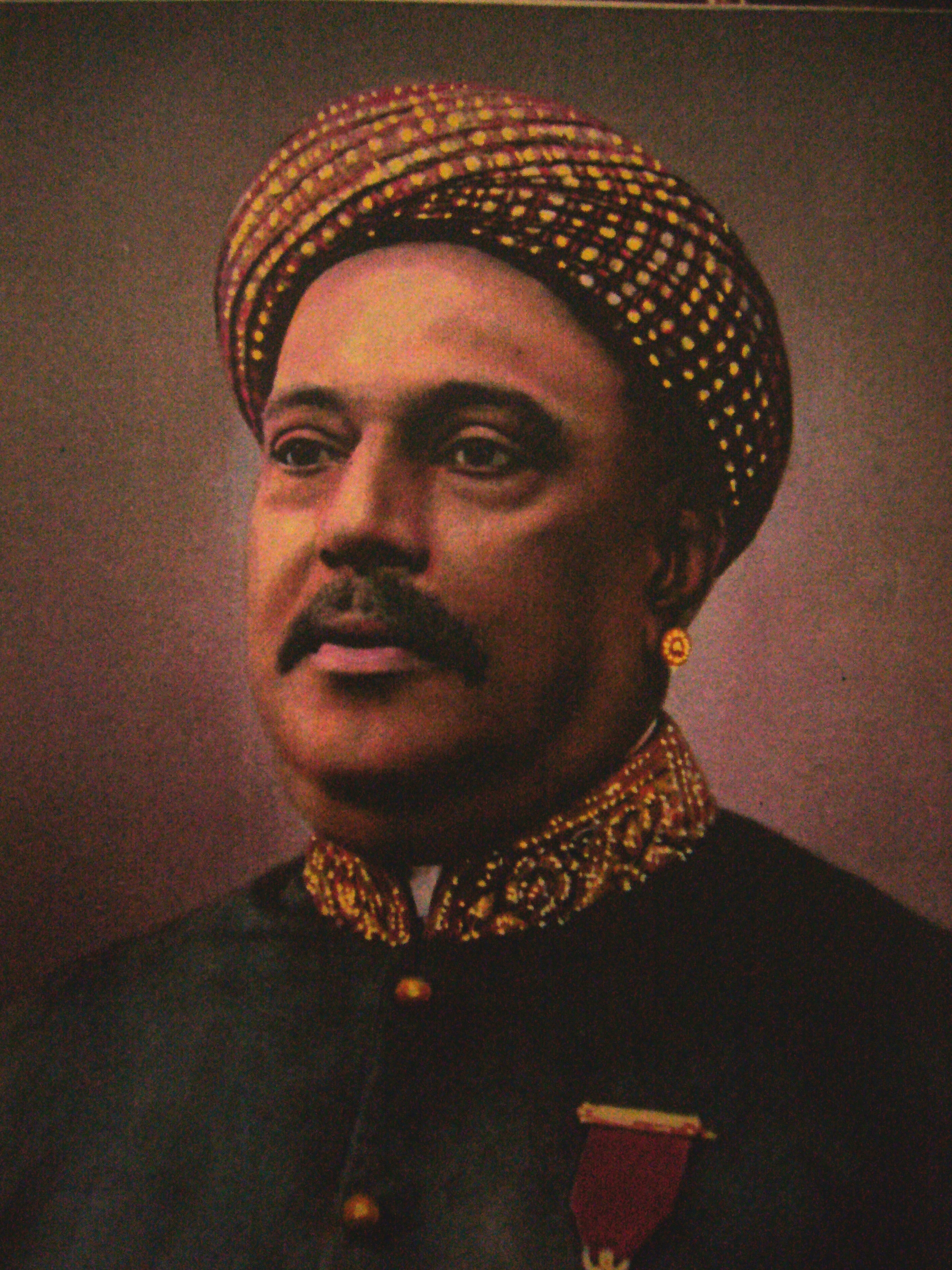
Indian National Congress Leader Raja Sir Savalai Ramaswamy Mudaliar

- K. A. Shanmuga Mudaliar: ex MLA and Chairman of Tirupattur. Founder of Government Thirumagal Mill's College by donating his 47 acres land.
- Raja Sir S. Ramaswami Mudaliar, an INC leader, merchant, dubash, politician and philanthropist known for starting Choultry near Chennai Central and philanthropic activities in Cuddalore .
- T. M. Jambulingam Mudaliar, Philanthropist from cuddalore who was donator of 620 acres land to Neyveli lignite corporation.

== Social workers ==
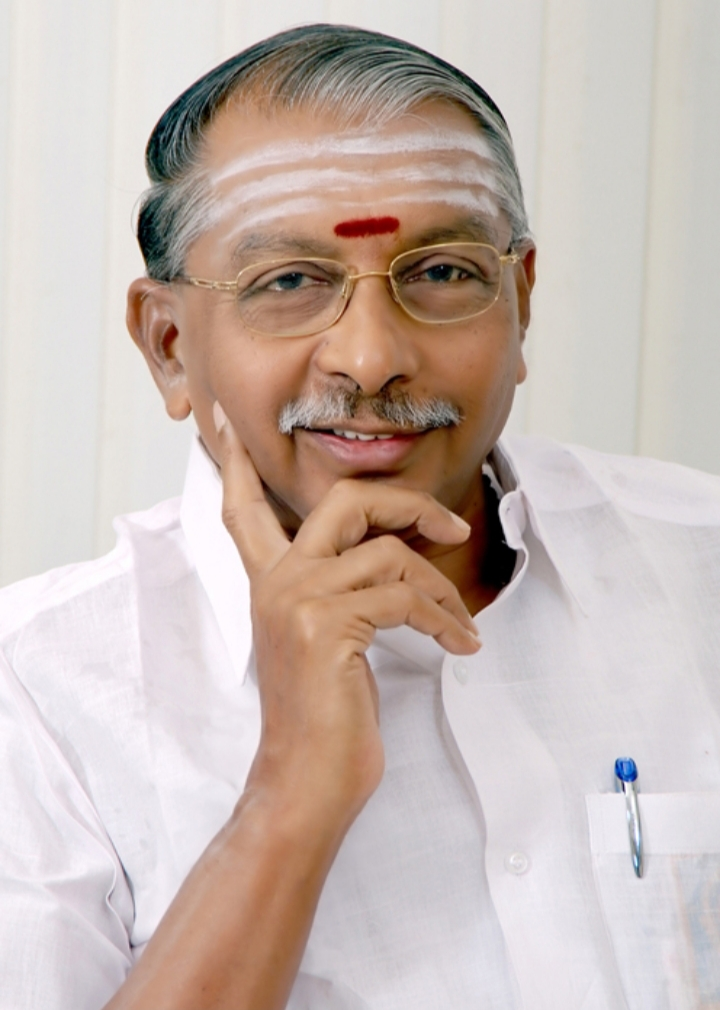
J.Sudhanandhen Mudaliyar

- P. K. Gopal: is an Indian social worker, Padma Sri awardee and a co-founder of International Association for Integration, Dignity and Economic Advancement.
- J. Sudhanandhen Mudaliyar: an Indian philanthropist, educationalist, and textile merchant. He founded Erode Sengunthar Engineering College and M.P.Nachimuthu M.Jaganathan Engineering College in Erode district of Tamil Nadu state.
- M.P. Nachimuthu Mudaliar, a philanthropist from Chennimalai. He was the founder of Chentex weavers co-operative society in which thousands of weavers benefited and he was a Padma Shree awardee. He was former president of Senguntha Mahajana Sangam.

== Entrepreneurs ==
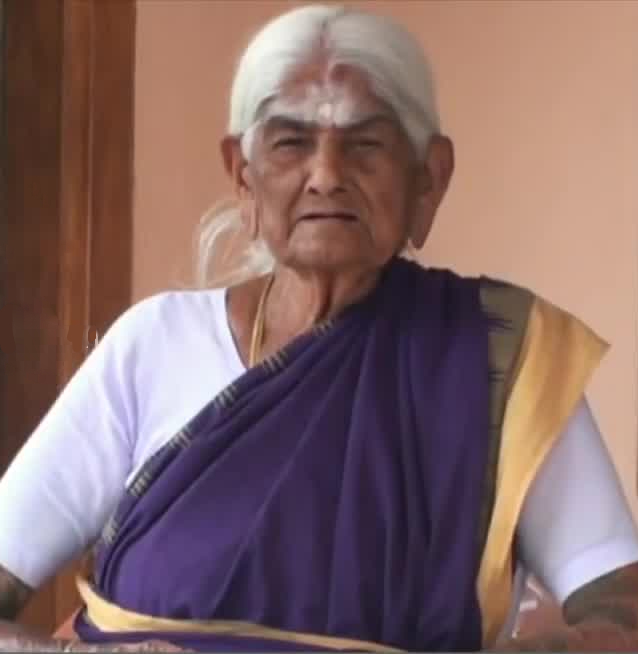
Padma Sri Pappammal

- Pappammal: was an organic farmer from Tamil Nadu, India. She was a Padma Sri awardee and was also elected as a councillor in the Karamadai Panchayat Union. She was a member of the Dravida Munnetra Kazhagam (DMK). At the age of 105, she was said to be the oldest farmer still active in the field. The Government of India honoured her in 2021, with the fourth highest civilian award of Padma Shri for her role in organic farming.

== Literature ==
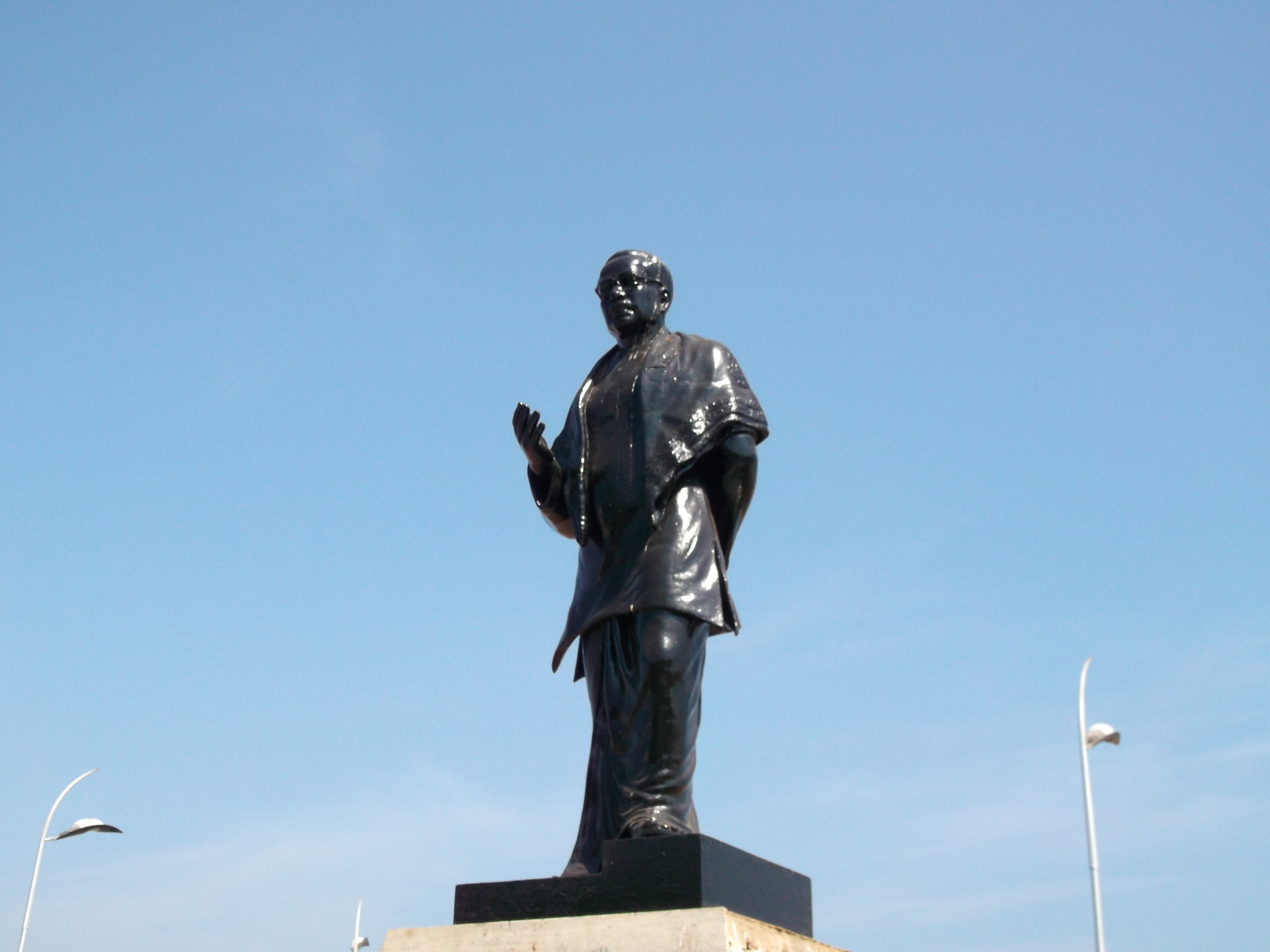
Tamil poet Puratchi Kavignar Barathidasan Statue at Marina Beach in Chennai

- Irattaipulavar (Mudhusooriyar, Ilam sooriyar) 14th century poetical-duo (one blind and one lame) who authored Ekambaranathar ula.
- Kangeyar, a 14th-century poet who wrote "Urichol Nigandu".
- Arunagirinathar was a Tamil Shaiva saint-poet lived during the 14th century in Tamil Nadu, India.
- Padikasu Pulavar Tamil poet of 17th century known for his work 'Thondaimandala Sadhakam'.
- Bharathidhasan (1891–1964) (born as Kanaga. Subburathinam Mudaliar) known as Paavendhar, Puratchi Kavignar, Tamil poet, politician, social activist and teacher. The Government of Puducherry union territory has adopted the song of Invocation to Mother Tamil, written by Bharathidhasan as the state song of Puducherry (Tamil Thai Valthu (Puducherry)).
- Tamilanban (b.1933): Tamil Poet and writer.

== Civil Service ==
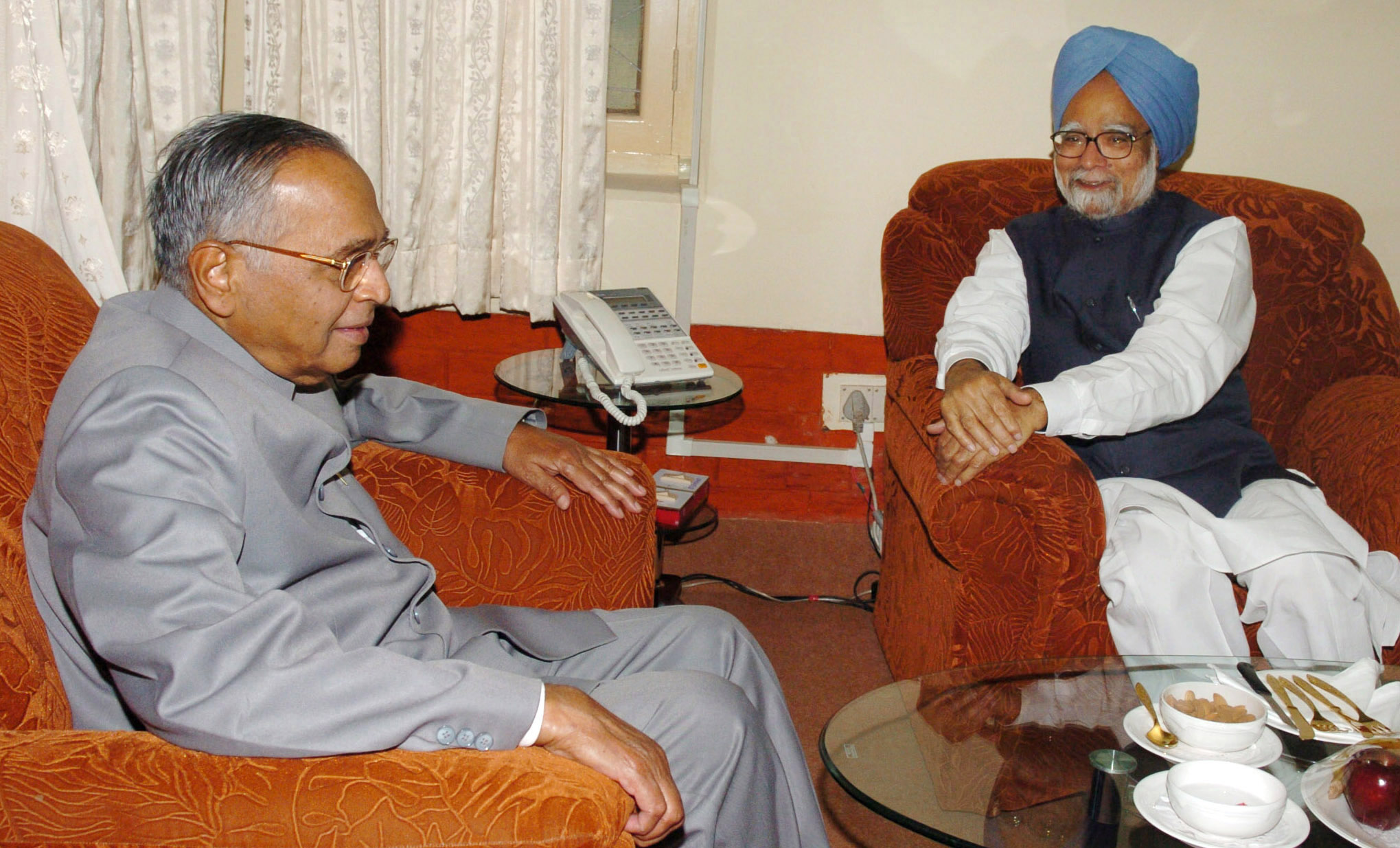
The Prime Minister, Dr. Manmohan Singh meeting with the Governor of Uttar Pradesh, Shri T.V. Rajeshwar, at Varanasi in Uttar Pradesh on March 14, 2008

- T. V. Rajeswar IPS: former Deputy Commissioner of Hyderabad state, Intelligence Bureau chief and a Governor of 4 states.
- Sujatha: former IFS officer, Indian Ambassador to Germany and Secretary to the Ministry of External Affairs of India.
- M. M. Rajendran: was an Indian IAS officer who became Chief Secretary of Tamil Nadu and Governor of Odisha. Earlier he was a member of UNICEF’s executive board and vice chairman of its program committee at New York. He was sponsored by a Tamil Nadu-based political party for the post of President of India in 2012.

== Politics ==
India:

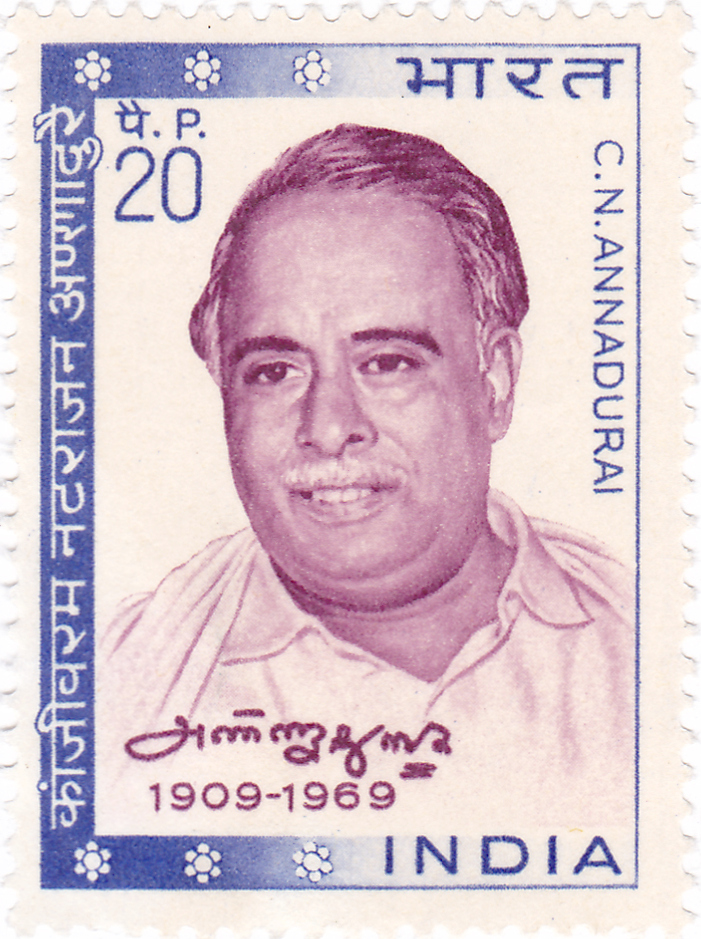
First Chief Minister of Tamil Nadu C.N. Annadurai

- M. Alalasundaram: Sri Lankan Tamil teacher, politician and former MP for Kobai district.
- T. M. Anbarasan: Minister for Rural Industries, Cottage Industries, Small Industries, Slum clearance board in the Indian state of Tamil Nadu Government. He served as district DMK secretary of Kancheepuram. He had been elected to the Tamil Nadu assembly thrice.
- C. N. Annadurai: First Chief Minister of Tamil Nadu and founder of the DMK party
- Cheyyar Devaraj ex MLA for Cheyyar.
- Pulavar K. Govindan: 4 times elected as MLA. Two times elected as speaker of Tamil Nadu legislative Assembly.
- S. J. Ramaswamy Mudali: Former DMK MP.
- A. B. Sakthivel Mudaliar: an Indian politician and incumbent member of the Tamil Nadu Legislative Assembly from the Salem South Assembly constituency. He represents the All India Anna Dravida Munnetra Kazhagam (AIADMK) party.
- A. Mariappan Mudaliar: is an Indian politician, Philanthropist and was ex MLA of Salem - I constituency. Mariappa Mudaliar was president of the Ammapettai Handloom Weavers'Cooperative Society from 1952 to 1971. This cooperative society is oldest and biggest in Tamil Nadu. This cooperative Society improved the economy of thousands of weavers.
- C. P. Subbiah Mudaliar: Former Vice President of Indian National Congress party from Coimbatore
- C. Gopal Mudaliyar: ADMK politician, Former Sholinghur MLA and a former Arakkonam MP. President of AMMK party.
- E. S. Thyagarajan Mudaliar: Prominent leader of DMK and he was former MLA of Tiruttani constituency. Uncle of Dr. E.S.S. Raman.
- M. R. Kandasamy Mudaliar: is an Indian politician, Textile merchant and former Member of the Legislative Assembly of Tamil Nadu from Veerapandi constituency as an Indian National Congress candidate in 1957 election. He was born in Sengunthar Kaikola Mudaliyar family in Salem district.
- S. C. Sadayappa Mudaliar
- S. Murugaiyan, Former DMK MP and MLA.
- Dr. E.S.S. Raman: State Vice President Tamil Maanila Congress and was former MLA of Pallipattu constituency.
- Sevvoor S. Ramachandran: Indian politician and a member of the 15th Tamil Nadu Legislative Assembly. He was elected from Arni constituency, Thiruvannamalai as a candidate of the AIADMK. He became the Minister for Hindu Religious and Charitable Endowments in 2016.
- P. A. Saminathan: Indian politician and former Member of Parliament elected from Tamil Nadu. He was elected to the Lok Sabha from Gobichettipalayam constituency(now called as Tiruppur lok Sabha) as a DMK candidate in 1967, and 1971 elections.
- V. Saminathan BJP leader of Puducherry state ex-MLA and current BJP state president of Puducherry.
- B. Senguttuvan: Prominent lawyer from Vellore and former Member of Parliament.
- S. Sivaraj, Former INC Politician and served as Rishivandhiyam MLA.
- V. Somasundaram Former ADMK Handloom Minister and former Uthiramerur MLA.
- M. Sundaram, Former INC Politician and served as Rishivandhiyam MLA.

Sri Lanka:

- S. Kanagaratnam: Former MP of the Vanni district of Sri Lanka. He was educated at the Senguntha Hindu College in Nallur.
- Sri Sabaratnam: An early leader of the Tamil independence movement in Tamil Nadu. He was also the political leader of the Tamil Eelam Liberation Organisation (TELO), a Sri Lankan Tamil militant group.

Malaysia:

- G. Palanivel: Former Minister of Natural Resources and Environment of Malaysia.

== Arts and Cinema ==
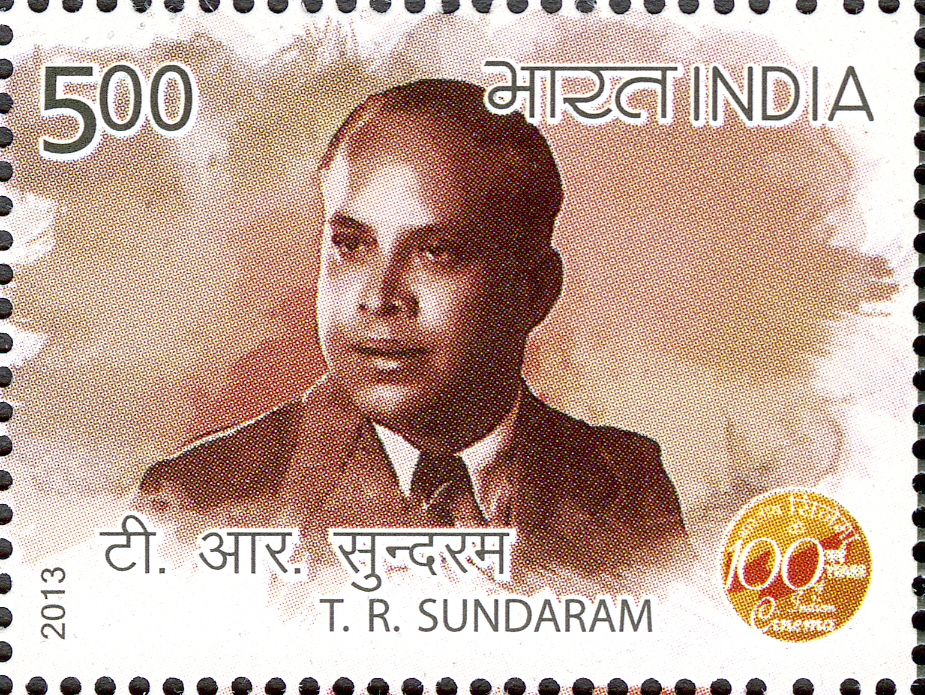
Actor and producer T.R. Sundaram Mudaliar

- T. R. Sundaram Mudaliyar Yesteryears Film producer and Founder of Modern Theatres Ltd.The studio produced over more than 150 films until 1982 in Tamil, Telugu, Kannada, Malayalam, Hindi, Sinhalese and even English of which Tamil were the majority.
- P.A. Perumal Mudaliar, Producer, director and founder of National Pictures Limited which distributed more than 200 films . He introduced Sivaji Ganesan and M. R. Radha to the cinema world.
- A. Jagannathan, Yesteryears Tamil film director
- P. S. Veerappa, Yesteryears Tamil film producer and actor.
- Thyagarajan: is an Indian actor, director and producer in Tamil cinema. Beside Tamil, he has also acted in several Malayalam and Kannada films and a few Telugu films.He is the father of Tamil actor Prashanth and the maternal uncle of Tamil actor Vikram and son in law of Peketi Sivaram
- Rajagopala Kulashekharan: was an Indian music composer who worked mainly for Malayalam movies. He composed music for 52 films (23 in Malayalam with 127 songs), and was the music conductor for more than 100 films. He is the father of music composers and singers A. R. Rahman and A. R. Reihana.
- A. R. Rahman: Indian music composer, record producer, singer, songwriter, multi-instrumentalist, and philanthropist known for his works in Indian cinema; predominantly in Tamil and Hindi films. He is a recipient of six National Film Awards, two Academy Awards, two Grammy Awards, a BAFTA Award, a Golden Globe Award, six Tamil Nadu State Film Awards, fifteen Filmfare Awards, and eighteen Filmfare Awards South, and the Padma Bhushan
- R.K. Selvamani, President, Film Employees Federation of South India (FEFSI) and film director who directed more than 15 films.
- Na. Muthukumar: Late Tamil poet, movie script writer and lyricist.
- Anandaraj: Tamil film actor. He has acted in villain roles in several Tamil films and has appeared in over a two hundred films in different languages including Kannada, Telugu, Malayalam and Hindi.
- Pandiarajan: Tamil film actor who has played leading roles in many humorous Tamil films.
- Prashanth: known for his works predominantly in Tamil cinema. Besides Tamil films, he has also appeared in few Telugu, Hindi and Malayalam films. At the peak of his career in the late 1990s, Prashanth was one of the popular actors in South India. He has won a Kalaimamani Award from the Government of Tamil Nadu.
- Pa. Vijay: Tamil poet, film actor and lyricist. He won the National Film Award for Best Lyrics in India for his song Ovvoru Pookalume in Cheran's Autograph (2004).
- G. V. Prakash Kumar: is an Indian music composer, playback singer, actor, and film producer known for his work in Tamil cinema. He has won one National Award, three Filmfare Awards and three SIIMA Awards in his film career.
- Lokesh Kanagaraj: Tamil film director. He created the Lokesh Cinematic Universe franchise.
- Tharini Mudaliar: Australian actress, singer and violinist. She was born in South Africa to a Tamil Sengundar family.
- Judo Ratnam: Asia's best stunt master and the person who has done stunts in the most films.
- Valayapatti A. R. Subramaniam: Indian classical musician and percussionist, considered by many as one of the foremost prominent exponents of thavil also known as dolu, a traditional percussion instrument in Carnatic music. Padma Shri awardee.
- G. Gnanasambandan: Indian professor, Tamil scholar, author, orator and an actor who appears in Tamil films. He frequently chairs Tamil debate shows (Pattimandrams). Dr G Gnanasambandan is originally from Sholavandan of Madurai district. He was a Professor of Tamil-language at Thiagarajar College, Madurai.
- Shoba Chandrasekhar: Playback singer and mother of former actor and the ninth Chief Minister of Tamil Nadu Vijay

== Science ==
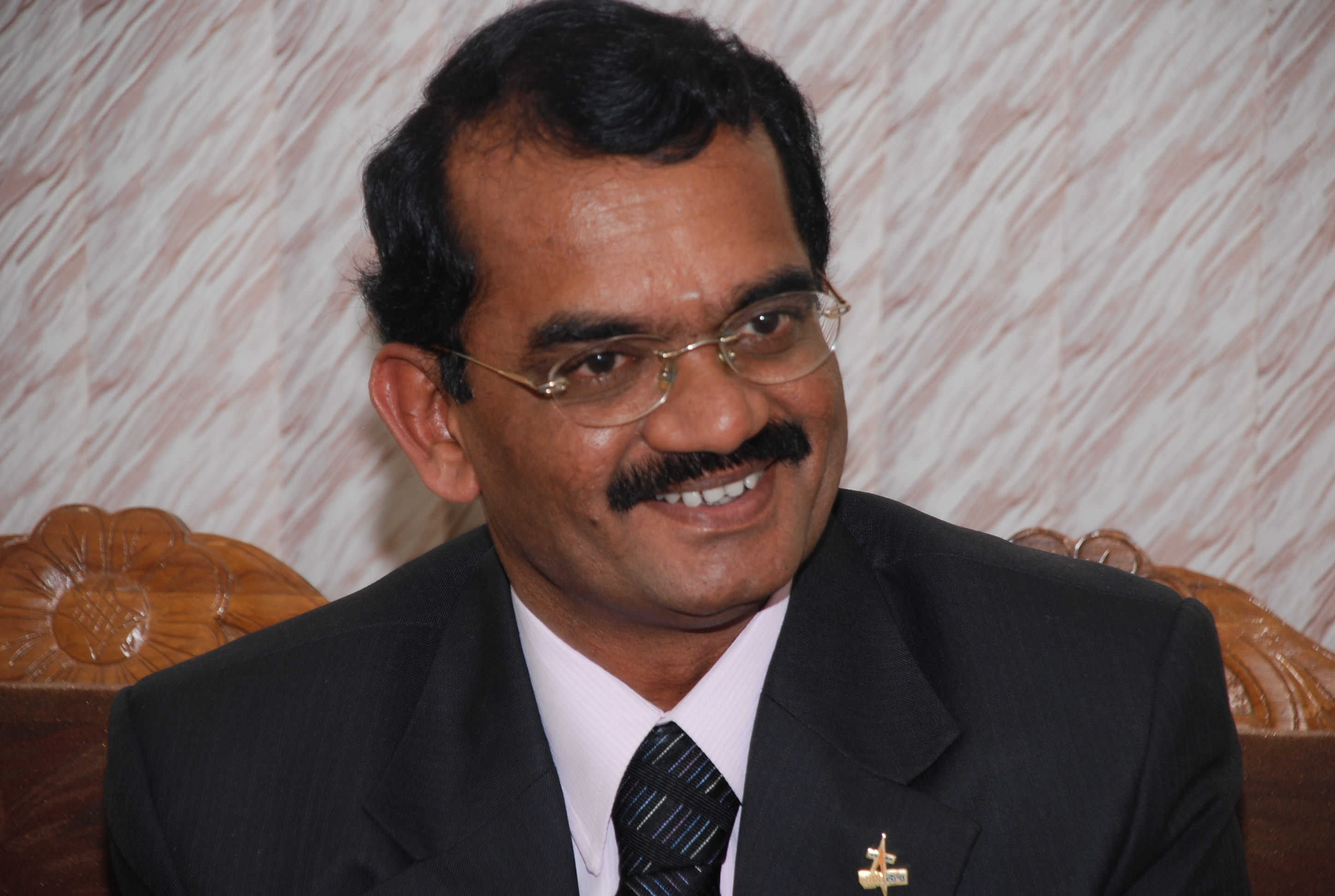
Former ISRO Scientist and Director Mylswamy Annadurai

- Mylsamy Annadurai, former ISRO scientist and former director, ISRO Satellite Centre (ISAC), Bengaluru and programme director of Chandrayaan-1 and Mangalyaan mission.
- M. Annamalai, Space scientist and former director of the Satish Dhawan Space Centre, Sriharikota and Senior Advisor for Space Transportations Systems at ISRO.

== Spiritual ==
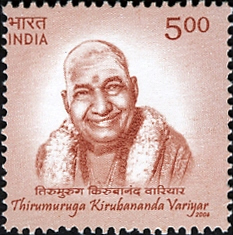
Kirupanandha Variyar 2006 Stamp of India

- Dandi Adigal Nayanar: is the 31st Nayanar saint. Traditional hagiographies like Periya Puranam (13th century CE) and Thiruthondar Thogai (10th century CE) describe him as a great devotee of the Hindu god Shiva.
- Kanampulla Nayanar: is the 46th Nayanar saint. Traditional hagiographies such as the Periya Puranam (13th century CE) and Thiruthondar Thogai (10th century CE) describe him as a great devotee of the Hindu god Shiva.
- Kirupanandha Variyar: was a Shaivite spiritual teacher from India. He was an ardent Murugan devotee who helped rebuild and complete the works on many of the temples across the state. People believes him as 64th Nayanar saint.
- Vethathiri Maharishi: is an Indian yoga guru, philosopher and Hindu spiritual leader. He founded the World Community Service Centre (WCSC) in Chennai and established the Temple of Consciousness (Arivu Thirukkoil) at Aliyar near Coimbatore.

== Sports ==
- Thirunavukkarasu Kumaran: Also known as 'Kenny' and 'Thirukumaran', he was an Indian first-class cricketer in the past.
- Elavenil Valarivan: She is an Indian sport shooter from Cuddalore, Tamil Nadu.
- Sharvaanica A S: Won the bronze medal in the World Chess Championship - 2023 (under-8 tournament). Won the Asian Under-7 Chess Championship champion title. She is the youngest female chess player to reach an elo of 2000.
