= Karipatti =

- Village
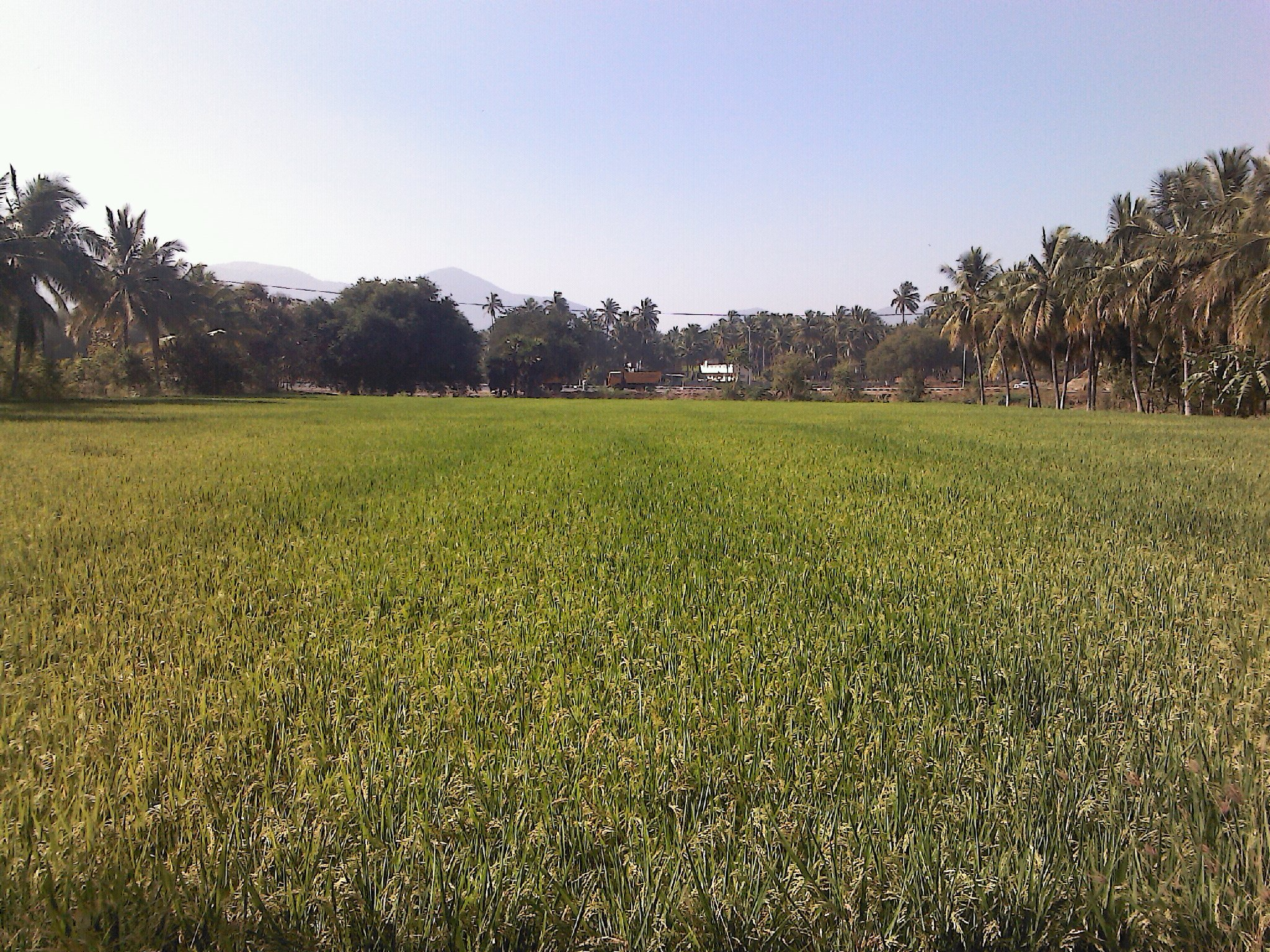
- Paddy field in Karipatti Village நெல் வயல்

- Location in Tamil Nadu, India Karipatti (India)
- Coordinates: 11.66°N 78.28°E
- Country: India
- State: Tamil Nadu
- District: Salem
- Metro: Salem Metropolitan Area
- Elevation: 321 m (1,053 ft)

Population (2011)
  - Total: 4,937

Languages
  - Official: Tamil
- Time zone: UTC+5:30 (IST)
- Postal code: 636106
- Vehicle registration: TN-54, TN-77

Karipatti is one of the most developed villages in the Salem district of Tamil Nadu, India. It is located 15 km towards East from District headquarters Salem. 6 km from Ayodhiyapattinam. 308 km from State capital Chennai. Karipatti Pin code is 636106 and postal head office is Karipatti. Tamil is the Local Language here. National Highway 68 (NH 68) is pass through this village. It is one of the important highways in Tamil Nadu which is connecting the district headquarters Salem to the state headquarters Chennai. A Karipatti Police Station is located in this village.

Government Primary Health Centre with ambulances and few private clinics are also available in this village.

Karur Vysya Bank (Two KVB ATM available in either side of this village (East and west) ) and Primary Agricultural Cooperative Credit Societies have a branch in this village. Karipatti has good bus transportation to Salem city and train facility also available.

Karipatti T. Ponnumalai was a famous DMK politician. He was elected as a member of Tamil Nadu legislative assembly from panamarathuppatti constituency in 1967 and 1972 elections.

Nearest tourist places by Karipatti include Malaikovil (1.5 km) and Vowal Thoppu (2 km). Karipatti Mariamman temple located as center of the village. Yercaud is a hill station in Salem District, in Tamil Nadu, which is located 35 km from this village.

== Demographics ==
According to 2011 census, Karipatti had a population of 4,937 with a sex-ratio of 1,015 females for every 1,000 males, much above the national average of 929. A total of 470 were under the age of six. Scheduled Castes and Scheduled Tribes accounted for 57.36% and 0.24% of the population respectively. The average literacy of the village 77.95%, compared to the national average of 72.99%. The village had a total of 1278 households. In Karipatti village out of total population, 2324 were engaged in work activities. 95.22% of workers describe their work as main work (Employment or Earning more than 6 months) while 4.78% were involved in marginal activity providing livelihood for less than 6 months. Of 2324 workers engaged in Main Work, 235 were cultivators (owner or co-owner) while 847 were agricultural labourer.

== Geography and Climate ==
The average elevation is 321 m (1,053 ft). The village is surrounded by hills on three sides, namely, Servarayan hills in the north, Jarugumalai in the south and the Godumalai to the east.

Karipatti receives scanty rainfall and a dry climate. Karipatti has moderate-dry weather throughout except during the monsoon season. Generally, the first two months of the year are pleasant, with summer beginning around March. The highest temperatures normally occur during May. This period of time sees scanty rainfall. The climate become more temperate during June–July period. During this pre-monsoon period, the mercury reverses its upward trend, and by August, the sky gets overcast heavily but the rains are meagre. The northeast monsoon sets in vigorously during September–November; by December, the rains disappear rendering the climate clear and pleasant.

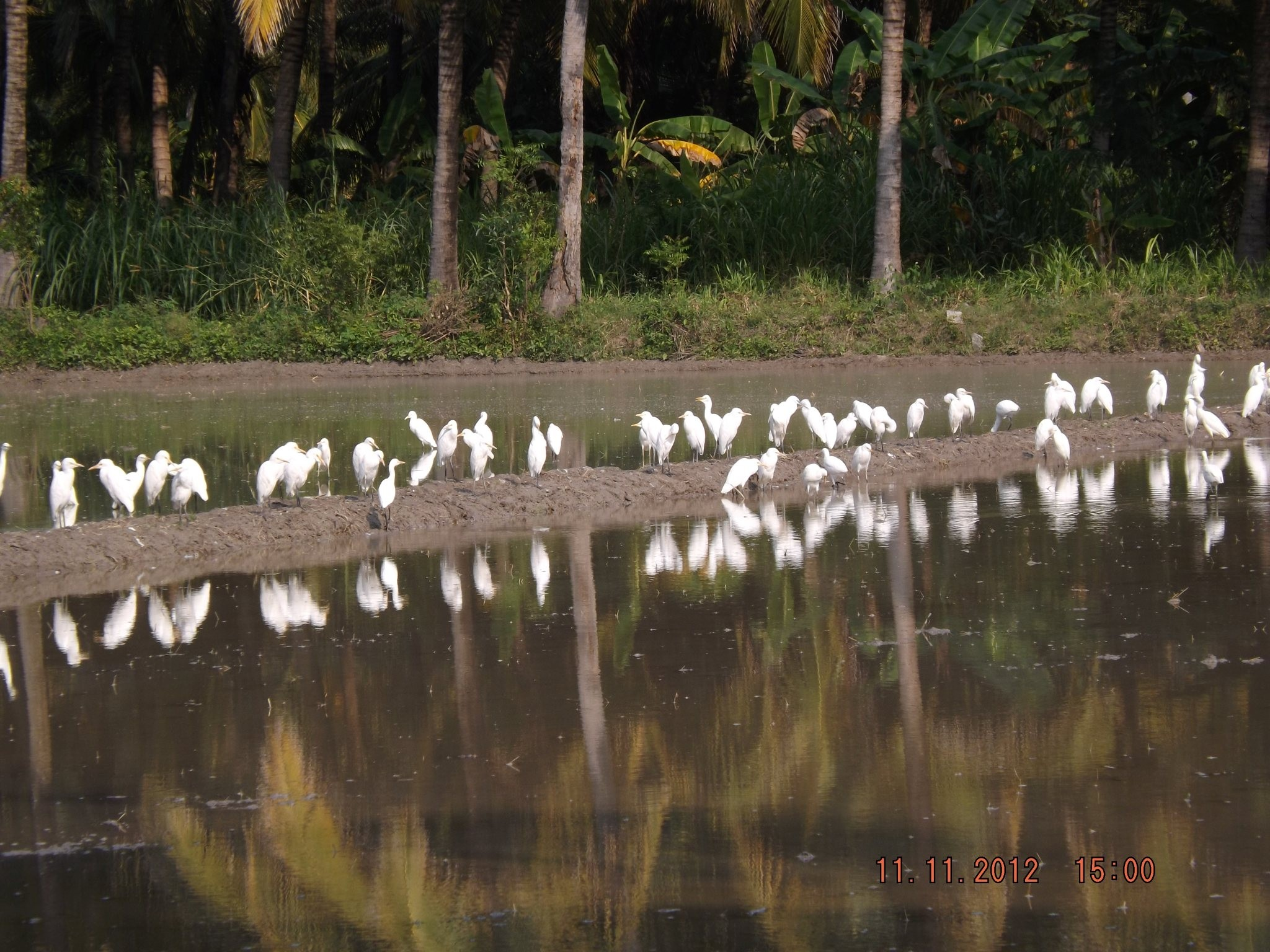
Birds in Agricultural Land - Karipatti

== Education ==
Label Children Nursery School (Pre KG to 5th standard) and Government High School (1st to 10th standard) have locations in Karipatti. ABS Botanical Conservation Research and Training Centre located in Karipatti, this institution was recognized by Periyar University, Salem as a "Research and training centre" on 15.09.2003. Totally two Polytechnic colleges, two Engineering colleges and three Arts & Science colleges are located around this village.

== Economy ==
The major business is Agriculture. Industries like Hatsun Agro Product Ltd, SP Spinning Mills Pvt Ltd, Shivashakthi Xylem Crop Science Private Limited and Sathosh Plastics have production facilities in Karipatti. SAGAAI Mushroom Farm produces Oyster mushroom and mushroom spawn in Karipatti. Sericulture (Pattu Valarppu) and poultry farming are developing business in karipatti

== How To Reach ==
=== By Rail ===
Minnampalli Rail Way Station (which is located in this village itself), Ayodhyapattanam Rail Way Station (6 km) are the very nearby railway stations to Karipatti. However Salem Jn Rail Way Station is major railway station 20 km near to Karipatti.

Salem Vriddhachalam Passenger (UnReserved) and Bangalore City - Karaikal Fast Passenger (UnReserved) will stop in Minnampalli Rail Way Station (which is located in this village itself)

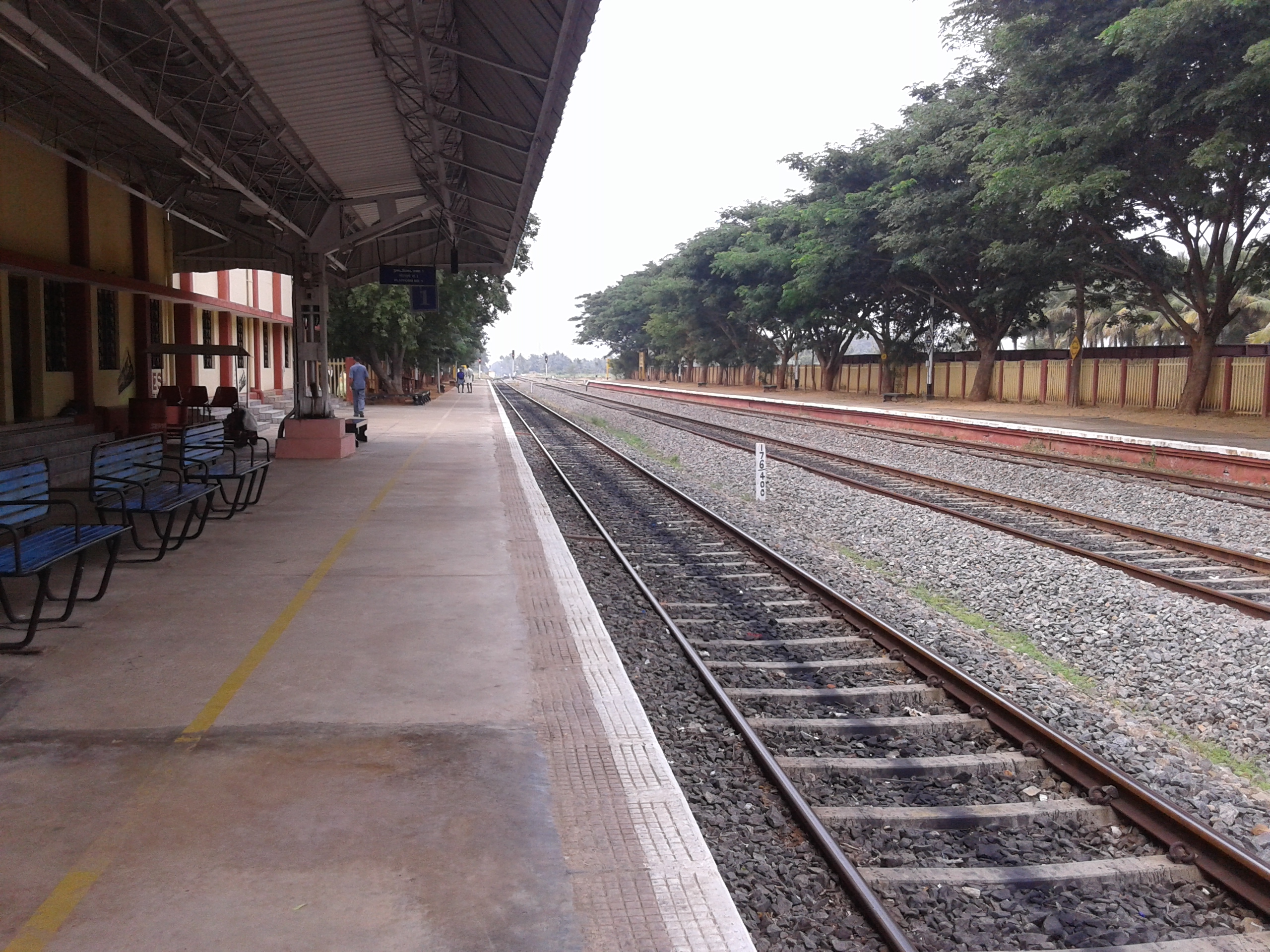
Minnampalli Rail Way Station (Karipatti)

=== By Bus ===
Karipatti has good bus transportation to Salem city. Buses from Salem to Attur, Kallakurichi, Villupuram, Chidambaram and Chennai are pass through this village.

All Salem to Attur mofussil buses and town buses 74, 44 will stop in this village. Karipatti is having a police station which is very famous.

== Sub Villages in Karipatti ==
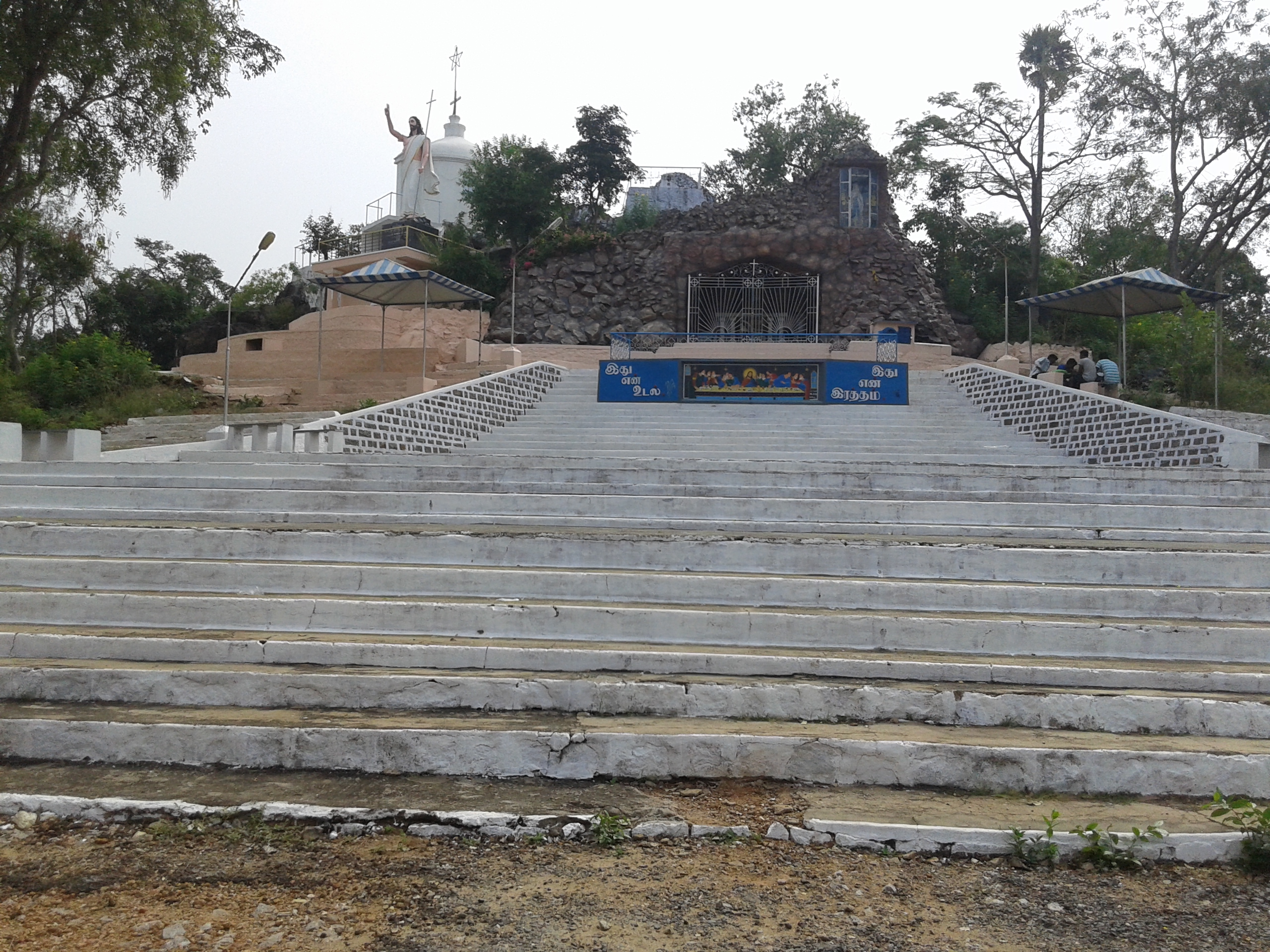
Malaikovil Lourdu Annai Shrine

Loorthu Nagar, Mamarathu Kadu, Nehru Nagar, Rajiv Nagar, Karunanithi Nagar and Moondrukottai Kadu are the Sub Villages of Karipatti. Minnampalli (2 km), Mettupatti (3 km), Kullampatti (4 km), Pallipatti (6 km), Masinaickenpatti (6 km) are the nearby Villages to Karipatti. Karipatti is surrounded by Vazhapadi taluk towards East, Yercaud taluk towards North, Salem taluk towards west, Panaimarathupatti Taluk towards west.

== External links and references ==
- About Karipatti
- Hatsun Agro Products Ltd
- KVB Location Karipatti
- ABS Botanical Garden Karipatti
