= M. Rajamuthu =

Indian politician

Member of the Tamil Nadu Legislative Assembly
- In office 2 May 2021 – 4 May 2026
- Preceded by: P. Manonmani
- Succeeded by: Palanivel M. S.
- Constituency: Veerapandi

Personal details
- Party: All India Anna Dravida Munnetra Kazhagam

M. Rajamuthu is an Indian politician who is a Member of Legislative Assembly of Tamil Nadu. He was elected from Veerapandi as an All India Anna Dravida Munnetra Kazhagam candidate in 2021.

== Electoral performance ==
2021 Tamil Nadu Legislative Assembly election: Veerapandi
| Party | Candidate | Votes | % | ±% |
|---|---|---|---|---|
| AIADMK | M. Rajamuthu | 111,682 | 50.24% | +4.39 |
| DMK | A. K. Tharun | 91,787 | 41.29% | +2.44 |
| NTK | S. Rajeshkumar | 9,806 | 4.41% | +3.81 |
| AMMK | S. K. Selvam | 4,986 | 2.24% | New |
| NOTA | NOTA | 1,409 | 0.63% | −0.73 |
| IJK | R. Amutha | 1,302 | 0.59% | New |
| Margin of victory | | 19,895 | 8.95% | 1.94% |
| Turnout | | 222,293 | 85.48% | −0.92% |
| Rejected ballots | | 1063 | 0.48% | |
| Registered electors | | 260,064 | | |
| AIADMK hold | | Swing | 4.39% | |
