= E. Balasubramanian =

Indian politician

Member of the Tamil Nadu Legislative Assembly
- In office 2 May 2021 – 4 May 2026
- Preceded by: A. B. Sakthivel Mudaliar
- Constituency: Salem (South)

Personal details
- Party: All India Anna Dravida Munnetra Kazhagam

E. Balasubramanian is an Indian politician who is a Member of Legislative Assembly of Tamil Nadu. He was elected from Salem (South) as an All India Anna Dravida Munnetra Kazhagam candidate in 2021.

== Electoral performance ==
2021 Tamil Nadu Legislative Assembly election: Salem South
Party	Candidate	Votes	%	±%
AIADMK	E. Balasubramanian	97,506	49.22%	−2.18%
DMK	A. S. Saravanan	74,897	37.80%	1.80%
MNM	M. Prabu Manikandan	10,368	5.23%	
NTK	S. Mariamma	10,176	5.14%	4.23%
AMMK	Se. Venkatajalam	2,970	1.50%	
NOTA	Nota	1,860	0.94%	−1.14%
Margin of victory		22,609	11.41%	−3.98%
Turnout		1,98,122	76.09%	0.92%
Rejected ballots		184	0.09%	
Registered electors		2,60,372		
AIADMK hold		Swing	-2.18%	
