= S. Venkatachalam =

Indian politician

S. Venkatajalam

Member of the Legislative Assembly, Tamil Nadu Legislative Assembly
- In office 2001–2006
- Preceded by: K. Rajaram
- Succeeded by: L. Ravichandran
- Constituency: Salem-I

Personal details
- Born: 5 March 1955 Karadvadapuram, Salem district
- Party: All India Anna Dravida Munnetra Kazhagam
- Profession: Politician

S. Venkatajalam is an Indian politician and a former Member of the Tamil Nadu Legislative Assembly. He hails from the Karadvadapuram area in the Salem district. A graduate with a Bachelor of Science (B.Sc.) degree, Venkatajalam belongs to the All India Anna Dravida Munnetra Kazhagam (AIADMK) party. He contested and won the 2001 Tamil Nadu Legislative Assembly election from the Salem – I Assembly constituency to become a Member of the Legislative Assembly.

== Electoral Performance ==
=== 2001 ===
2001 Tamil Nadu Legislative Assembly election: Salem-I
Party	Candidate	Votes	%	±%
AIADMK	S. Venkatachalam	66,365	60.01%	
DMK	M. A. Elangovan	41,234	37.29%	−21.53%
MDMK	T. Ravikrishnan	976	0.88%	−0.21%
Independent	L. S. Anburaj	847	0.77%	
Independent	S. Rajkumar	431	0.39%	
Independent	B. V. Prakash	198	0.18%	
Independent	N. Sakthivel	106	0.10%	
Independent	P. Duraisamy	100	0.09%	
Independent	I. Babu	91	0.08%	
Independent	P. Madhesu	87	0.08%	
Independent	A. Saravanakumar	85	0.08%	
Margin of victory		25,131	22.72%	−3.62%
Turnout		110,590	63.87%	−1.50%
Registered electors		173,264		
AIADMK gain from DMK		Swing	1.19%	
