= M. K. Selvaraju =

Indian politician

M. K. Selvaraju is an Indian politician and former member of the Tamil Nadu Legislative Assembly representing the Salem South constituency from 2011 to 2016. He represents the Anna Dravida Munnetra Kazhagam party.
