= M. S. Palanivel =

Indian politician (born 1969)

M. Sabapathi Palanivel (born 1969) is an Indian politician from Tamil Nadu. He is a member of the Tamil Nadu Legislative Assembly from the Veerapandi Assembly constituency in Salem district representing the Tamilaga Vettri Kazhagam.

Palanivel is from Villivakam, Chennai district. He is the son of Sabapathi. He studied at Government Higher Secondary School, Mallasamuthiram and passed Class 12 examinations in 1988. He runs his own mining business. He declared assets worth Rs. 35 crore in his affidavit to the Election Commission of India.

== Career ==
Palanivel won the Veerapandi Assembly constituency representing the Tamilaga Vettri Kazhagam in the 2026 Tamil Nadu Legislative Assembly election. He polled 79,907 votes and defeated his nearest opponent, Sri Balaji Sugumar of the All India Anna Dravida Munnetra Kazhagam (AIADMK), by a margin of 4,071 votes.
