= S. K. Selvam =

Indian politician

S. K. Selvam is an Indian politician and former member of the Tamil Nadu Legislative Assembly from the Veerapandi constituency. As a cadre of Anna Dravida Munnetra Kazhagam party, he was previously elected to the same Veerapandi constituency in 2001 elections.

S. K. Selvam is the second generation politician from the former minister Veerapandy S. Arumugam's family, though he represents Anna Dravida Munnetra Kazhagam.
