= Karipatti T. Ponnumalai =

Indian politician

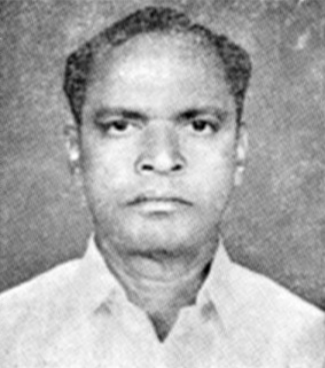
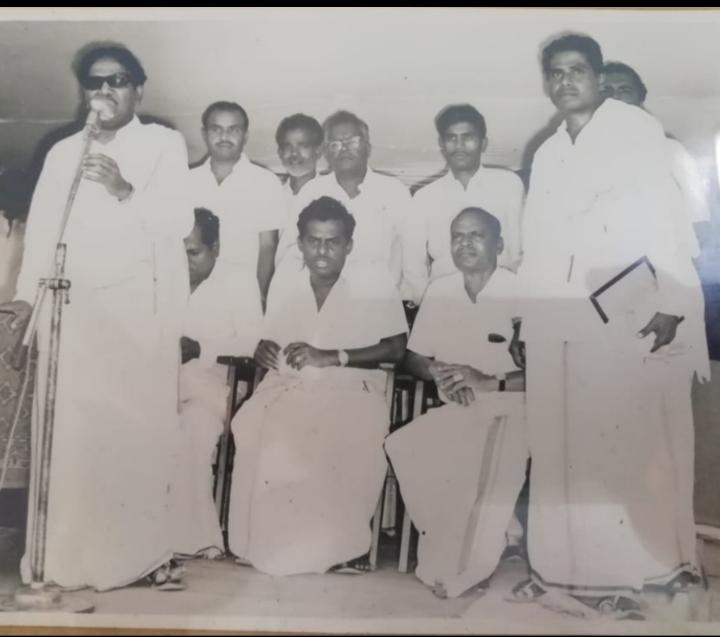

Member of Tamil Nadu Legislative Assembly for Panamarathupatti

Personal details
- Born: Karipatti, Salem, Tamil Nadu
- Died: Karipatti
- Party: DMK

Karipatti T. Ponnumalai was an Indian politician and former Member of the Legislative Assembly of Tamil Nadu. He was elected to the Tamil Nadu legislative assembly as a Dravida Munnetra Kazhagam candidate from the Panamarathupatti constituency in the 1967 and 1971 elections. He was the member of the Tamil Nadu electric board advisory committee. He won the first prize in the Salem district paddy cultivation contest in 1957 for producing 7,750 lbs paddy per acre. He participated in the agitation by Dravida Munnetra Kazhagam against rises in price and imprisoned in a Salem subjail.
