= K. R. G. Dhanapalan =

Indian politician

K. R. G. Dhanapalan is an Indian politician and was a Member of the Legislative Assembly of Tamil Nadu. He was elected to the Tamil Nadu legislative assembly as a Dravida Munnetra Kazhagam candidate from Salem-I constituency in the 1989 and 1996 elections.
