= S. R. Sivalingam =

Indian politician

Member of Parliament, Rajya Sabha
- Incumbent
- Assumed office 25 July 2025
- Preceded by: M. Shanmugam
- Constituency: Tamil Nadu

Member of Tamil Nadu Legislative Assembly
- In office 1996–2001
- Preceded by: K. Rajaram
- Succeeded by: P. Vijayalakshmi
- Constituency: Panamarathupatty
- In office 1989–1991
- Preceded by: K. Rajaram
- Succeeded by: K. Rajaram
- Constituency: Panamarathupatty

S. R. Sivalingam was elected to the Tamil Nadu Legislative Assembly from the Panamarathupatti constituency in the 1989 and 1996 elections. He was a candidate of the Dravida Munnetra Kazhagam (DMK) party.
