= P. Vijayalakshmi =

Indian politician

Member of Legislative Assembly
- In office 2011 -2016
- Constituency: Sankari (State Assembly Constituency)

Minister of Social Welfare
- In office 27 August 2004 – 12 May 2006
- Chief Minister: J. Jayalalithaa
- Preceded by: B. Valarmathi
- Succeeded by: Poongothai Aladi Aruna

Minister of Khadi and Handlooms
- In office 10 Feb 1985 – 21 Oct 1986
- Chief Minister: M. G. Ramachandran

Member of Legislative Assembly
- In office 2001–2006
- Constituency: Panamarathupatti (State Assembly Constituency)
- In office 1980 - 1989 (2 terms)
- Constituency: Veerapandi (State Assembly Constituency)

Vijayalakshmi Palanisami is a former minister and Member of the Legislative Assembly of Tamil Nadu from Sankagiri constituency. (2011–2016) defeating her uncle and DMK strongman Veerapandi S. Arumugam. Previously, she was elected to the Tamil Nadu legislative assembly from Veerapandi constituency as an Anna Dravida Munnetra Kazhagam candidate in 1980, and 1984 elections. Again she was elected from Panamarathupatti (State Assembly Constituency) in 2001 elections during which she served as Social welfare minister. In 1985, she was made Khadi and Handlooms minister by then Chief Minister M. G. Ramachandran, only to be removed from the post along with 10 other ministers in 1986. After the death of ADMK supremo J. Jayalalithaa, she was briefly in OPS camp along with former minister Semmalai, but soon returned to partyfold.
