= Panamarathupatty Assembly constituency =

Former constituency in Tamil Nadu, India

Coordinates: 11.56°N 78.16°E

Panamarathupatty
- Former constituency for the Tamil Nadu Legislative Assembly

Constituency details
- Country: India
- Region: South India
- State: Tamil Nadu
- District: Salem
- Lok Sabha constituency: Salem
- Established: 1967
- Abolished: 2008
- Total electors: 209,051
- Reservation: None

Panamarathupatty is a former state assembly constituency in Salem district in Tamil Nadu, India. Elections and winners in the constituency are listed below.

== Members of the Legislative Assembly ==
Year	Winner	Party
1967	Karipatti T. Ponnumalai	Dravida Munnetra Kazhagam
1971	Karipatti T. Ponnumalai	Dravida Munnetra Kazhagam
1977	N. Subbarayan	All India Anna Dravida Munnetra Kazhagam
1980	K. Rajaram	All India Anna Dravida Munnetra Kazhagam
1984	K. Rajaram	All India Anna Dravida Munnetra Kazhagam
1989	S. R. Sivalingam	Dravida Munnetra Kazhagam
1991	K. Rajaram	All India Anna Dravida Munnetra Kazhagam
1996	S. R. Sivalingam	Dravida Munnetra Kazhagam
2001	P. Vijayalakshmi Palanisamy	All India Anna Dravida Munnetra Kazhagam
2006	R. Rajendran	Dravida Munnetra Kazhagam

== Election results ==
Vote share of winning candidates
2006	44.58%
2001	64.51%
1996	49.76%
1991	69.12%
1989	31.89%
1984	60.35%
1980	57.25%
1977	45.04%
1971	54.42%
1967	53.70%

=== 2006 ===
2006 Tamil Nadu Legislative Assembly election: Panamarathupatty
Party	Candidate	Votes	%	±%
DMK	R. Rajendran	73,210	44.58%	14.81%
AIADMK	R. Elangovan	69,321	42.21%	−22.30%
DMDK	K. Suresh Babu	15,802	9.62%	
Independent	M. Rajendran	1,606	0.98%	
Independent	P. Rajendran	1,046	0.64%	
BJP	K. S. Venkatachalam	908	0.55%	
BSP	T. Vinayakamoorthi	784	0.48%	
SP	A. Govindan	498	0.30%	
Independent	K. Rajendran	233	0.14%	
Independent	C. Arivazhahan	160	0.10%	
Independent	A. Rajendran	147	0.09%	
Margin of victory		3,889	2.37%	−32.37%
Turnout		164,238	78.56%	16.26%
Registered electors		209,051		
DMK gain from AIADMK		Swing	-19.93%	

=== 2001 ===
2001 Tamil Nadu Legislative Assembly election: Panamarathupatty
Party	Candidate	Votes	%	±%
AIADMK	P. Vijayalakshmi	78,642	64.51%	26.38%
DMK	S. R. Sivalingam	36,292	29.77%	−19.99%
MDMK	V. Muthukrishnan	1,784	1.46%	0.52%
UCPI	Ganesan	1,432	1.17%	
Independent	S. Ponnuthambi	1,406	1.15%	
Independent	K. Rajaram	698	0.57%	
Independent	A. Gunasekaran	632	0.52%	
Independent	C. K. Srinivasan	347	0.28%	
Independent	M. Ramasamy @ Singaram	249	0.20%	
Independent	A. Alagarasan	228	0.19%	
Independent	N. Arthanari	200	0.16%	
Margin of victory		42,350	34.74%	23.10%
Turnout		121,910	62.31%	−5.76%
Registered electors		195,665		
AIADMK gain from DMK		Swing	14.75%	

=== 1996 ===
1996 Tamil Nadu Legislative Assembly election: Panamarathupatty
Party	Candidate	Votes	%	±%
DMK	S. R. Sivalingam	56,330	49.76%	30.34%
AIADMK	P. Vijayalakshmi Palanisamy	43,159	38.12%	−31.00%
PMK	M. Narayanan	10,620	9.38%	
MDMK	E. Manickam	1,068	0.94%	
RPI	S. Aranganathan	567	0.50%	
Independent	V. Selvam	390	0.34%	
Independent	M. C. Shanmugam	251	0.22%	
Independent	M. Manickam	215	0.19%	
Independent	K. M. Padmanabhan	179	0.16%	
Independent	V. Govindarajan	109	0.10%	
Independent	P. Raju	89	0.08%	
Margin of victory		13,171	11.63%	−38.07%
Turnout		113,204	68.07%	4.44%
Registered electors		173,919		
DMK gain from AIADMK		Swing	-19.36%	

=== 1991 ===
1991 Tamil Nadu Legislative Assembly election: Panamarathupatty
Party	Candidate	Votes	%	±%
AIADMK	K. Rajaram	70,025	69.12%	39.19%
DMK	S. R. Sivalingam	19,670	19.42%	−12.47%
PMK	P. N. Gunasekaran	10,417	10.28%	
JP	Vaithilingam Chinna	452	0.45%	
RPI	R. Thangaraju	219	0.22%	
Independent	N. Ardhanari	162	0.16%	
Independent	A. Chandran	155	0.15%	
Independent	K. S. Velliangiri Veerpand	83	0.08%	
Independent	G. Dhanapal	69	0.07%	
Independent	M. Ponnusamy	52	0.05%	
Margin of victory		50,355	49.71%	47.75%
Turnout		101,304	63.63%	−1.74%
Registered electors		165,166		
AIADMK gain from DMK		Swing	37.23%	

=== 1989 ===
1989 Tamil Nadu Legislative Assembly election: Panamarathupatty
Party	Candidate	Votes	%	±%
DMK	S. R. Sivalingam	29,805	31.89%	−2.55%
AIADMK	P. Thangavelan	27,980	29.94%	−30.41%
INC	Rangarajan Kumaramangalam	24,303	26.00%	
AIADMK	A. P. Murugesan	10,305	11.03%	−49.33%
Independent	M. C. Rajendran	514	0.55%	
Independent	C. Chinnusamy	249	0.27%	
Independent	K. R. Natesan	167	0.18%	
Independent	M. Venkatachalam	135	0.14%	
Margin of victory		1,825	1.95%	−23.95%
Turnout		93,458	65.37%	−6.15%
Registered electors		147,552		
DMK gain from AIADMK		Swing	-28.46%	

=== 1984 ===
1984 Tamil Nadu Legislative Assembly election: Panamarathupatty
Party	Candidate	Votes	%	±%
AIADMK	K. Rajaram	48,726	60.35%	3.10%
DMK	S. R. Sivalingam	27,810	34.45%	
Independent	S. Kandasamy	2,550	3.16%	
Independent	K. Ramaswamy	424	0.53%	
Independent	P. Mohan	349	0.43%	
Independent	Subramaniam Rama	327	0.41%	
Independent	A. Natarajan	244	0.30%	
Independent	K. Ramalingam	242	0.30%	
Independent	Rukkumani Rajkumar	65	0.08%	
Margin of victory		20,916	25.91%	9.59%
Turnout		80,737	71.51%	1.94%
Registered electors		120,913		
AIADMK hold		Swing	3.10%	

=== 1980 ===
1980 Tamil Nadu Legislative Assembly election: Panamarathupatty
Party	Candidate	Votes	%	±%
AIADMK	K. Rajaram	44,218	57.25%	12.21%
INC	P. M. Santhanantham	31,614	40.93%	26.06%
Independent	R. Arumugam	747	0.97%	
Independent	K. Ramalingam	659	0.85%	
Margin of victory		12,604	16.32%	−5.16%
Turnout		77,238	69.58%	10.29%
Registered electors		113,432		
AIADMK hold		Swing	12.21%	

=== 1977 ===
1977 Tamil Nadu Legislative Assembly election: Panamarathupatty
Party	Candidate	Votes	%	±%
AIADMK	N. Subbbarayan	27,676	45.04%	
DMK	S. C. Kanjamalai	14,478	23.56%	−30.86%
JP	R. Govindan	10,150	16.52%	
INC	N. M. Arjunan	9,140	14.88%	−25.91%
Margin of victory		13,198	21.48%	7.84%
Turnout		61,444	59.28%	−11.60%
Registered electors		105,129		
AIADMK gain from DMK		Swing	-9.38%	

=== 1971 ===
1971 Tamil Nadu Legislative Assembly election: Panamarathupatty
Party	Candidate	Votes	%	±%
DMK	Karipatti T. Ponnumalai	35,832	54.42%	0.72%
INC	P. Chinnu Alias Seperumal	26,854	40.79%	
Independent	K. S. Ayyasami	2,090	3.17%	
Independent	K. A. Sundaram	1,065	1.62%	
Margin of victory		8,978	13.64%	1.64%
Turnout		65,841	70.88%	−6.86%
Registered electors		95,939		
DMK hold		Swing	0.72%	

=== 1967 ===
1967 Madras Legislative Assembly election: Panamarathupatty
Party	Candidate	Votes	%	±%
DMK	Karipatti T. Ponnumalai	34,597	53.70%	
DMK	C. Sepperumal	26,870	41.70%	
CPI	K. K. Karuppannan	2,269	3.52%	
Independent	K. S. Ayyasamy	694	1.08%	
Margin of victory		7,727	11.99%	
Turnout		64,430	77.74%	
Registered electors		85,216		
DMK win (new seat)				
