= Salem South Assembly constituency =

State Legislative Assembly Constituency in Tamil Nadu

Coordinates: 11.61°N 78.15°E

Salem (South)
- Constituency No. 90 for the Tamil Nadu Legislative Assembly

Constituency details
- Country: India
- Region: South India
- State: Tamil Nadu
- District: Salem
- Lok Sabha constituency: Salem
- Established: 2008
- Total electors: 2,26,880

Member of Legislative Assembly
- 17th Tamil Nadu Legislative Assembly
- Incumbent Vijay Tamilan Parthiban. A
- Party: TVK
- Alliance: TVK+
- Elected year: 2026

Salem South or 'Salem (South)' is a state assembly constituency in the Indian state of Tamil Nadu that was formed after the constituency delimitations of 2008. Its State Assembly Constituency number is 90. The previous constituencies, Salem I and Salem II, were redrawn as Salem North, Salem South and Salem West. It is one of the 234 State Legislative Assembly Constituencies in Tamil Nadu.

Salem South comprises Salem Municipal Corporation Wards No. 37 to 60. It is a part of the wider Salem Lok Sabha constituency for national elections to the Parliament of India.

== Demographics ==
Demographics
Category	Data
Created	2016
Sourashtra Chetty/Devanga Chettiar	16%
Sozhiya Velalar / Pillaimar	10%
Sengunthar Mudliyar	24%
Vanniyar	10%
Adi Dravida	10.5%
Others	28.5%
Total Electorate	2,63,233

== Members of Legislative Assembly ==
Year	Winner	Party
2011	M. K. Selvaraju	All India Anna Dravida Munnetra Kazhagam
2016	A. B. Sakthivel	All India Anna Dravida Munnetra Kazhagam
2021	E. Balasubramanian	All India Anna Dravida Munnetra Kazhagam
2026	Vijay Tamilan Parthiban. A	Tamilaga Vettri Kazhagam

== Election results ==
Vote share of winning candidates
2026	43.95%
2021	49.22%
2016	51.39%
2011	64.97%

=== 2026 ===
2026 Tamil Nadu Legislative Assembly election: Salem (South)
Party	Candidate	Votes	%	±%
TVK	Vijay Tamilan Parthiban	91,371	43.95	New
DMK	Loganathan. M	58,002	27.90	▼9.90
AIADMK	Vinoth. J	50,216	24.15	▼25.07
NTK	Sofia. S	5,819	2.80	▼2.34
NOTA	NOTA	745	0.36	▼0.58
Margin of victory		33,369	16.05	▲4.64
Turnout		2,07,902	91.64	▲15.55
Registered electors		2,26,880		▼33,492
TVK gain from AIADMK		Swing	▲43.95	

=== 2021 ===
2021 Tamil Nadu Legislative Assembly election: Salem South
Party	Candidate	Votes	%	±%
AIADMK	E. Balasubramanian	97,506	49.22	−2.18
DMK	A. S. Saravanan	74,897	37.80	1.80
MNM	M. Prabu Manikandan	10,368	5.23	
NTK	S. Mariamma	10,176	5.14	4.23
AMMK	Se. Venkatajalam	2,970	1.50	
NOTA	Nota	1,860	0.94	−1.14
Margin of victory		22,609	11.41	−3.98
Turnout		1,98,122	76.09	0.92
Rejected ballots		184	0.09	
Registered electors		2,60,372		
AIADMK hold		Swing	-2.18	

=== 2016 ===
2016 Tamil Nadu Legislative Assembly election: Salem South
Party	Candidate	Votes	%	±%
AIADMK	Sakthivel A B	101,696	51.39	−13.57
DMK	Gunasekaran M	71,243	36.00	5.75
PMK	Kumar K	6,325	3.20	
BJP	Annadurai N	4,686	2.37	1.00
NOTA	None Of The Above	4,121	2.08	
VCK	Jayachandran G	3,983	2.01	
NTK	Prema B	1,788	0.90	
Margin of victory		30,453	15.39	−19.32
Turnout		1,97,889	75.18	−3.69
Registered electors		2,63,233		
AIADMK hold		Swing	-13.57	

=== 2011 ===
2011 Tamil Nadu Legislative Assembly election: Salem South
Party	Candidate	Votes	%	±%
AIADMK	Selvaraju. M. K.	112,691	64.97	
DMK	S. R. Sivalingam	52,476	30.25	
BJP	Annadurai. N	2,377	1.37	
UCPI	Mahalingam. N	2,325	1.34	
Margin of victory		60,215	34.71	{{{change}}}
Turnout		2,19,949	78.87	
Registered electors		1,73,464		
AIADMK win (new seat)				
