= Veerapandy S. Arumugam =

Indian politician

Veerapandi S. Arumugam
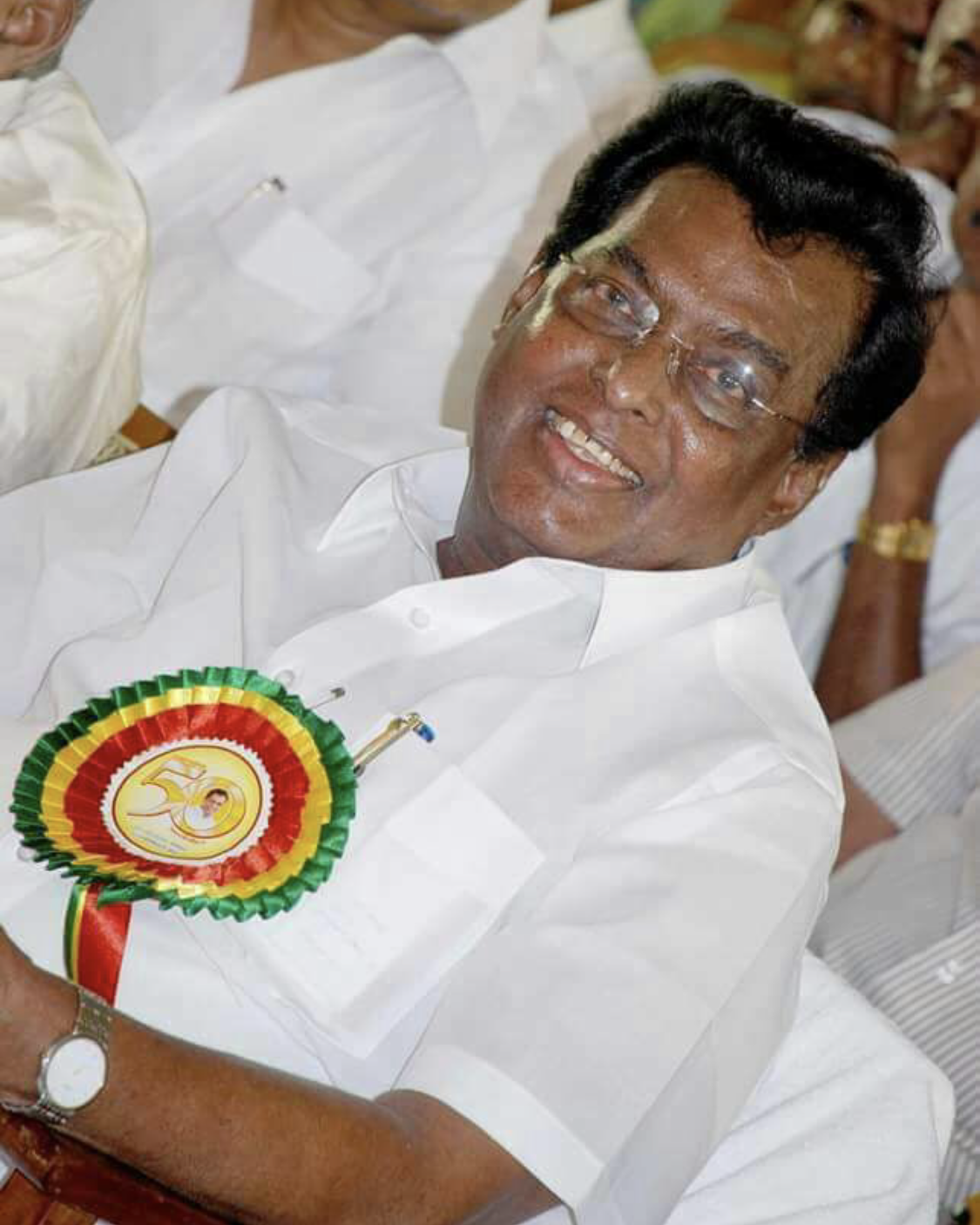
- Arumugam at a function in Salem to mark 50 years of public life

Member of the Madras State Assembly and Tamil Nadu State Assembly
- In office 1962 - 1977
- Preceded by: M. R. Kandasamy Mudaliar
- Succeeded by: P. Venga Gounder
- Constituency: Veerapandi
- In office 1996 - 2001
- Preceded by: K. Arjunan
- Succeeded by: K. Arjunan
- Constituency: Veerapandi
- In office 1989 - 1991
- Preceded by: Arumugam
- Succeeded by: M. Natesan
- Constituency: Salem – II
- In office 2006 - 2011
- Preceded by: M. Karthe
- Succeeded by: constituency abolished
- Constituency: Salem – II

Member of the Tamil Nadu Legislative Council
- In office 1978–1984
- Constituency: Elected by MLAs

Personal details
- Born: Veerapandi Solai Aarumugam; 26 January 1937 Poolavari, Salem district, Tamil Nadu
- Died: 23 November 2012 (aged 75) Chennai, Tamil Nadu
- Occupation: politician

Veerapandi S Arumugam (26 January 1937 – 23 November 2012) was a Tamil Nadu politician. He was born to Solai Goundar in Poolavari, Salem.

He died on 23 November 2012 in Chennai due to illness.

== Political career ==
Arumugam first became a Dravida Munnetra Kazhagam member in 1957.

In his early age he was inspired by the writings and speeches of the late Chief Minister and DMK founder C. N. Annadurai and party chief M Karunanidhi, Arumugam plunged into politics when he was 14. He was elected to the Tamil Nadu Legislative Assembly five times. Arumugam was among the few non-founding leaders in the DMK, who enjoyed unquestioned respect and stature. He also served as the Minister for Rural Development and Local Administration and the Minister for Agriculture.
