= Kanampulla Nayanar =

Personal life
- Born: Pullirukkuveloor (Vaitheeswaran Kovil)
- Honors: Nayanar saint,

Religious life
- Religion: Hinduism
- Philosophy: Shaivism, Bhakti

Kanampulla Nayanar is the 46th Nayanar saint. Traditional hagiographies such as the Periya Puranam (13th century CE) and Thiruthondar Thogai (10th century CE) describe him as a great devotee of the Hindu god Shiva.

Kanampulla Nayanar was a grass cutter; selling the special Kanampul grass used for lamp wicks in Shiva temples. Because of this Kanampul has become associated with his name.

== Hagiographical account of Life ==
Kanampulla Nayanar was born into a farming family in Pullirukkuveloor or Irukkuveloor, located at Sirkazhi Taluk, Nagapattinam District, Tamil Nadu. The Vaitheeswaran Temple dedicated to him, is located in Pullirukkuveloor.

As a farmer, Kanampulla Nayanar spent all his money in lighting the lamps in various Shiva temples. The Nayanar saint sang hymns to Shiva and served the deity and his devotees. Due to his devotional practices, Kanampulla Nayanar's wealth quickly eroded; he moved to Thillai Nataraja Temple, Chidambaram, where he earned a living by cutting and selling Kanampul grass. With the money he earned, the saint purchased ghee (clarified butter) to light lamps in the Shiva temple.

Legend has it that Shiva decided to test Kanampulla Nayanar's devotion. Due to a famine, he was unable a to sell grass, but the Nayanar saint wanted to continue to serve Shiva by lighting lamps in his temple. He prepared a wick from the dry grass and burnt it, but it soon extinguished. In despair, he offered his own hair for burning. He extended his head near the lamp and spread his hair to be burnt. Pleased by the Nayanar's deep devotion, Shiva appeared before him and released him from the cycle of rebirth.

Tamil month karthikai - Kiruthikai star is widely celebrated as Guru Puja Day of Kanampulla Nayanar.
