= Valliamma Munuswami Mudliar =

South African Hindu

Valliamma Mudliar
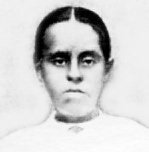
- Born: 22 February 1898; Johannesburg, Transvaal
- Died: 22 February 1914 (aged 16); Johannesburg, South Africa
- Other name: Thillaiyadi Valliammai

Valliamma Munuswami Mudliar (also written as Munuswamy Mudaliar), also known as Thillaiyadi Valliammai (22 February 1898 – 22 February 1914), was a South African Indian Tamil girl who worked with Mahatma Gandhi in her early years when she developed her nonviolent methods in South Africa fighting its apartheid regime.

== Biography ==
She was born to R. Munuswamy Mudaliar and Mangalam, a young immigrant couple from a small village called Thillaiyadi in Tanjore (current Mayiladuthurai district), India to Johannesburg – the gold-city of South Africa to work for their way out of difficulty. She was from Sengunthar Kaikola Mudaliar community. Her father was a trader and owner of a confectionery shop. Since her mother Mangalam was from Thillaiyadi in Madras (now Tamil Nadu), her daughter Valliammai came to be popularly called Thillaiyadi Valliammai. Valliammai had never been to India. She grew in an environment that was rather hostile to Indians. But the young child did not even know that it was not right to be segregated so, until she was in her early teens.

A law was passed that any marriage that is not according to the Church or according to the marriage law of South Africa would be held null and void, which disproportionately affected the Indian community in that country. Doubts regarding of inheritance arose. Mohandas Karamchand Gandhi began his opposition. Young Valliammai joined her mother in the march by women from Transvaal to Natal – which was not legally permitted without passes.

Valliamma, and her mother Mangalam, joined the second batch of Transvaal women who went to Natal in October 1913 to explain the inequity of the three pound tax to the workers and persuade them to strike. (Valliamma’s father, R. Munuswamy Mudaliar, owner of a fruit and vegetable shop in Johannesburg and a satyagrahi in the Transvaal, was recovering from an operation). They visited different centres and addressed meetings. They were sentenced in December to three months with hard labour, and sent to the Maritzburg prison. Valliamma fell ill soon after her conviction, but refused an offer of early release by the prison authorities. She died shortly after release, on 22 February 1914.

Gandhi wrote in Satyagraha in South Africa:

"Valliamma R. Munuswami Mudaliar was a young girl of Johannesburg only sixteen years of age. She was confined to bed when I saw her. As she was a tall girl, her emaciated body was a terrible thing to behold.

'Valliamma, you do not repent of your having gone to jail?’ I asked.

'Repent? I am even now ready to go to jail again if I am arrested,’ said Valliamma.

"But what if it results in your death?’ I pursued.

'I do not mind it. Who would not love to die for one’s motherland?’ was the reply.

"Within a few days after this conversation Valliamma was no more with us in the flesh, but she left us the heritage of an immortal name…. And the name of Valliamma will live in the history of South African Satyagraha as long as India lives".

On 15 July 1914, three days before he left South Africa, Gandhi attended the unveiling of the gravestones of Nagappan and Valliamma in the Braamfontein cemetery in Johannesburg.

== Honors ==
Thillaiyadi Valliammai Memorial Hall, including a public library, was instituted in 1971 on 2452 square meters of land by the Indian Government in the village of Thillaiyadi, now in Tharangambadi Taluk, Mayavaram, India. The Library is functioning regularly in this memorial. Other buildings in her name include Thillaiyadi Valliammai Nagar and the Thillaiyadi Valliammai High School in Vennanthur.

India released a commemorative stamp for her on 31 December 2008.

American-Tamil Hip-Hop artist Professor A.L.I. releases the song "Herstory" about Thillaiyadi Valliammai

== Gallery ==
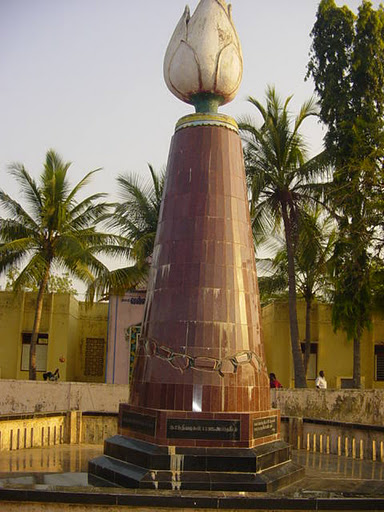
Memorial pillar for the Sathyagrahis (including Valliamma) in Thillaiyadi.

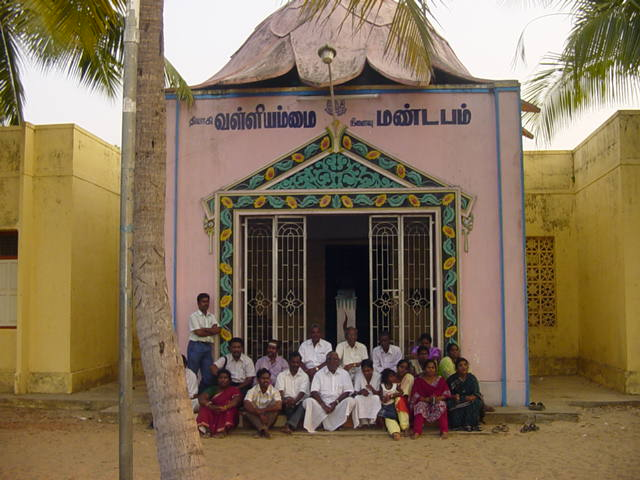
Thillaiyadi Valliammai memorial building, in her ancestral village.

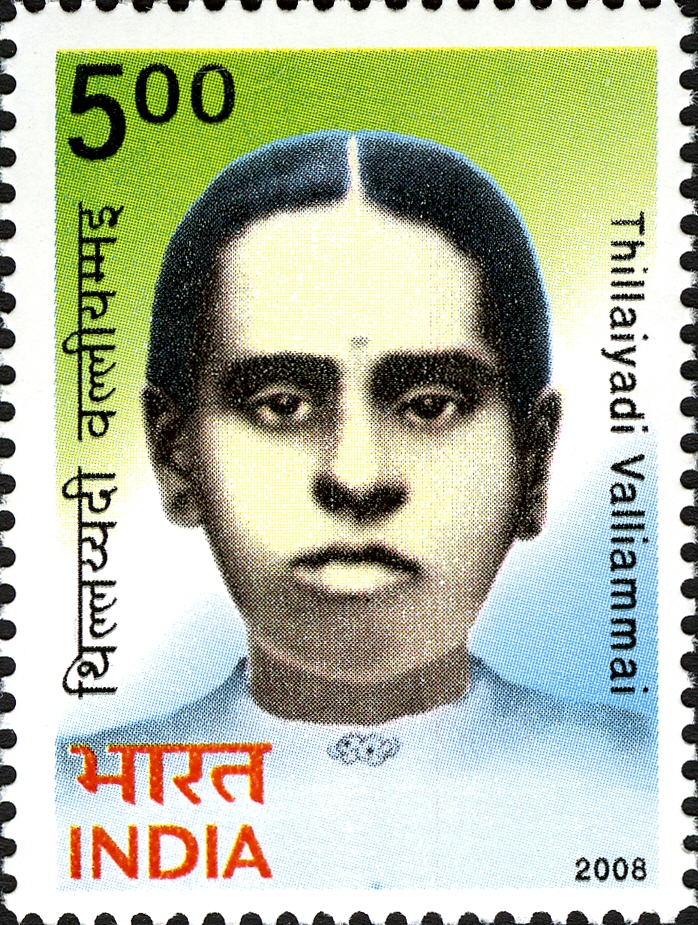
Valliamma on a 2008 Indian stamp, under her popular Indian name.
