= Karur Vysya Bank =

Indian private sector bank

The Karur Vysya Bank Limited
- Type: Public
- Traded as: NSE: KARURVYSYA; BSE: 590003
- Industry: Banking; Financial services
- Founded: 1916
- Headquarters: Karur, Tamil Nadu, India
- Key people: Meena Hemchandra (Chairperson); Ramesh Babu B (MD & CEO)
- Products: Consumer banking, Corporate banking, Finance and Insurance, Investment banking, Mortgage loans, Private banking, Wealth management, Credit cards
- Revenue: ▲₹11,602 crore (US$1.2 billion) (FY2024–25)
- Operating income: ▲₹4,259 crore (US$450 million) (FY2024–25)
- Net income: ▲₹1,856 crore (US$190 million) (FY2024–25)
- Total assets: ▲₹220,000 crore (US$23 billion) (FY2024–25)
- Number of employees: 9,100 (2025)
- Capital ratio: 16.7% (Capital adequacy)
- Website: kvb.bank.in

Karur Vysya Bank (KVB) is an Indian private sector bank, headquartered in Karur, Tamil Nadu. Established in 1916, the bank provides retail, corporate, and treasury banking services, and operates branches across India.

== History ==
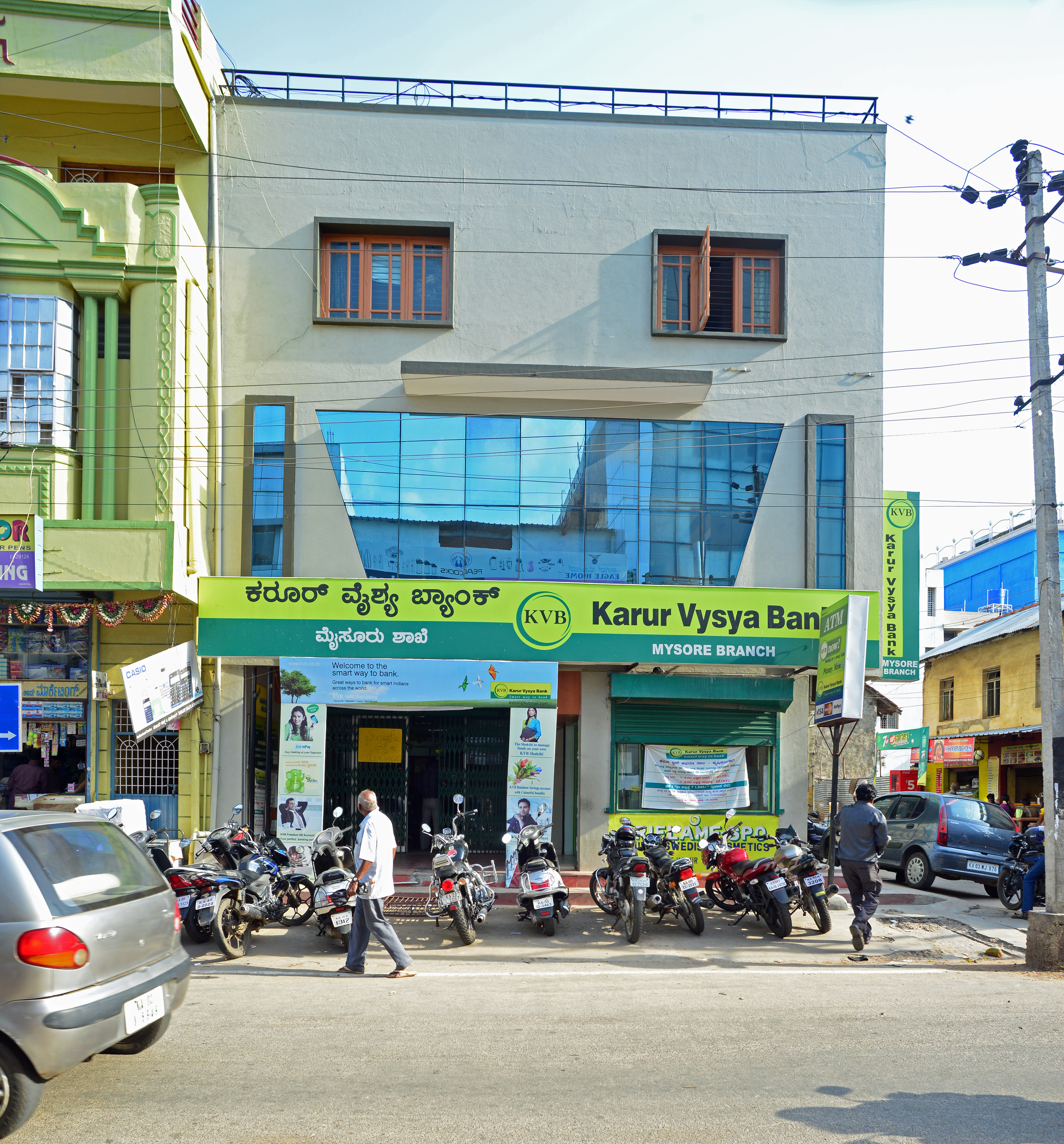
A Karur Vysya Bank branch in Mysore

Karur Vysya Bank was founded on 25 July 1916 by M. A. Venkatarama Chettiar and Athi Krishna Chettiar to serve the banking requirements of traders and agricultural communities in and around Karur, Tamil Nadu. The institution gradually expanded beyond its regional base and developed into a pan-India banking network over the following decades.

The bank's centenary celebrations were held in 2016 in Chennai, and were attended by the then President of India, Pranab Mukherjee.

== Operations and network ==
As of February 2026, Karur Vysya Bank operated had 900 branches and 1,650 automated teller machines (ATMs) across multiple states in India.

The bank provides services in:

- Retail and personal banking
- Corporate and wholesale banking
- Micro, Small and Medium Enterprises (MSME) financing
- Agricultural and rural banking
- Treasury and foreign exchange services

Its operations are regulated by the Reserve Bank of India and governed by statutory disclosures filed with Indian stock exchanges.

== See also ==
- Banking in India
- List of banks in India
- Reserve Bank of India
- Indian Financial System Code
