= The Chennai Silks =

Retail textile chain in India

- Type: Private
- Industry: Retail
- Founded: 1962
- Founder: Thiru. A. Kulandaivel Mudaliar
- Area served: Southern India
- Key people: TK Chandiran; K Sivalingam; K Manickam; P K Arumugam; K Nandhagopal; K Vinayagam; K Paramasivam
- Products: Textiles, ready-made, silk sarees
- Number of employees: 50000
- Parent: SCM Group
- Website: www.thechennaisilks.com

The Chennai Silks is chain of retail textile shops in South India.

== History ==
Its founder Thiru. A. Kulandaivel Mudaliar, who was born in a village Devarayampalayam, near Avinashi, entered the business in 1962. However its first textile shop was started in Tirupur in 1991 as "Kumaran Silks" later renamed as "The Chennai Silks" in 2001. They also export clothes for chain stores in the United States and Europe including Decathlon, Carrefour and Hanes.

A fire in 2017 destroyed the Chennai Silks building in Chennai.

In November 2025, the company partnered with Tamil Nadu Government and established a garment manufacturing unit worth ₹50 crore near Mannargudi.

== Records ==
In 2007, a Guinness world record – "most expensive silk saree" was created by Chennai Silks. It was worth about $100,021; £50,679 (worth ₹41 lakhs) and features reproductions of 11 famous paintings by the Indian artist Raja Ravi Varma. The main image is a reproduction of Raja Ravi Varma's Galaxy of Musicians. It took around 4760 hours to complete the design.
