= Pallikondan =

- Village
- Country: India
- State: Tamil Nadu
- District: Thanjavur
- Taluk: Pattukkottai

Languages
  - Official: Tamil
- Time zone: UTC+5:30 (IST)
- Postal code: 6
- Website: www.pallikondanmuthumariyamman.in

Pallikondan is a town in the Thanjavur (administrative district) of Thanjavur, Tamil Nadu, India.

== Etymology ==
- The origin of "pallikonda" is uncertain. The word may be derived from pallikondan, "the country of the pallikondan". According to a Hindu legend, vishnu descended lying on Ranganathar Temple
