= Salem – I Assembly constituency =

Former Legislative Assembly constituency in Tamil Nadu, India

Coordinates: 11.63°N 78.139°E

Salem-I
- Former constituency for the Tamil Nadu Legislative Assembly

Constituency details
- Country: India
- Region: South India
- State: Tamil Nadu
- District: Salem
- Lok Sabha constituency: Salem
- Established: 1951
- Abolished: 2008
- Total electors: 206,400
- Reservation: None

Salem-I is a former state assembly constituency in Tamil Nadu.

== History ==
Until 2008, the city of Salem was part of the Salem I and Salem II assembly constituencies. Since 1977, the ADMK party won the Salem I assembly seat five times (1977, 1980, 1984, 2001 and 2006); Dravida Munnetra Kazhagam won twice (1989 and 1996), and the Indian National Congress (INC) won in 1991.

The constituencies of Salem were redrawn as Salem North, Salem South and Salem West in 2008.

== Members of the Legislative Assembly ==
Year	Winner	Party
Madras State
1951	Varadarajulu Naidu	Indian National Congress
1957	A. Mariappan Mudaliar	Indian National Congress
1962	G. Venkataraman	Indian National Congress
1967	K. Jayaraman	Dravida Munnetra Kazhagam
Tamil Nadu
1971	K. Jayaraman	Dravida Munnetra Kazhagam
1977	S. V. Varadarajan	All India Anna Dravida Munnetra Kazhagam
1980	G. Krishnaraj	All India Anna Dravida Munnetra Kazhagam
1984	G. Krishnaraj	All India Anna Dravida Munnetra Kazhagam
1989	K. R. G. Dhanapalan	Dravida Munnetra Kazhagam
1991	S. R. Jayaraman	Indian National Congress
1996	K. R. G. Dhanapalan	Dravida Munnetra Kazhagam
2001	S. Venkatachalam	All India Anna Dravida Munnetra Kazhagam
2006	L. Ravichandran	All India Anna Dravida Munnetra Kazhagam

== Election results ==
Vote share of winning candidates
2006	44.13%
2001	60.01%
1996	58.82%
1991	65.97%
1989	43.67%
1984	51.80%
1980	52.55%
1977	38.21%
1971	50.92%
1967	57.92%
1962	50.67%
1957	45.21%

=== 2006 ===
2006 Tamil Nadu Legislative Assembly election: Salem-I
Party	Candidate	Votes	%	±%
AIADMK	L. Ravichandran	69,083	44.13%	−15.88%
INC	M. R. Suresh	56,266	35.94%	
DMDK	S. J. Dhanasekar	27,218	17.38%	
BJP	N. Annadurai	2,095	1.34%	
Independent	M. A. Shajahan	576	0.37%	
LJP	V. Poongodi	253	0.16%	
BSP	B. Sanaullakhan	237	0.15%	
Independent	S. Suresh	209	0.13%	
Independent	G. Srinivasan	190	0.12%	
Independent	S. Manickam	188	0.12%	
Independent	P. Rajagopal	157	0.10%	
Margin of victory		12,817	8.19%	−14.54%
Turnout		156,561	75.85%	11.99%
Registered electors		206,400		
AIADMK hold		Swing	-15.88%	

=== 2001 ===
2001 Tamil Nadu Legislative Assembly election: Salem-I
Party	Candidate	Votes	%	±%
AIADMK	S. E. Venkatajalam	66,365	60.01%	
DMK	M. A. Elangovan	41,234	37.29%	−21.53%
MDMK	T. Ravikrishnan	976	0.88%	−0.21%
Independent	L. S. Anburaj	847	0.77%	
Independent	S. Rajkumar	431	0.39%	
Independent	B. V. Prakash	198	0.18%	
Independent	N. Sakthivel	106	0.10%	
Independent	P. Duraisamy	100	0.09%	
Independent	I. Babu	91	0.08%	
Independent	P. Madhesu	87	0.08%	
Independent	A. Saravanakumar	85	0.08%	
Margin of victory		25,131	22.72%	−3.62%
Turnout		110,590	63.87%	−1.50%
Registered electors		173,264		
AIADMK gain from DMK		Swing	1.19%	

=== 1996 ===
1996 Tamil Nadu Legislative Assembly election: Salem-I
Party	Candidate	Votes	%	±%
DMK	K. R. G. Dhanapalan	67,566	58.82%	30.09%
INC	A. T. Natarajan	37,299	32.47%	−33.50%
AIIC(T)	S. R. Jeyaraman	4,437	3.86%	
BJP	B. Venugopalan	2,182	1.90%	−0.03%
MDMK	T. Ravikrishnan	1,259	1.10%	
Independent	R. Kasilingam	413	0.36%	
Independent	R. Sudhakaran	386	0.34%	
Independent	S. A. Samarasam	179	0.16%	
Independent	A. S. Saleem	124	0.11%	
Independent	K. M. Arumugam	112	0.10%	
Independent	K. Goverthanan	111	0.10%	
Margin of victory		30,267	26.35%	−10.90%
Turnout		114,875	65.36%	4.85%
Registered electors		180,579		
DMK gain from INC		Swing	-7.16%	

=== 1991 ===
1991 Tamil Nadu Legislative Assembly election: Salem-I
Party	Candidate	Votes	%	±%
INC	S. R. Jayaraman	72,792	65.97%	47.80%
DMK	G. K. Subash	31,698	28.73%	−14.94%
BJP	V. Ramanathan	2,130	1.93%	1.41%
IUML	M. B. Khader Hussain	1,806	1.64%	
JP	M. Kannamma Ganapathy	1,010	0.92%	
Independent	T. B. S. Arthanariasamy Chetty	125	0.11%	
Independent	P. M. Selvakumaran	102	0.09%	
Independent	S. Shan Muga Sundaram	93	0.08%	
Independent	P. Ravikumar	76	0.07%	
Independent	M. Vanaraji	68	0.06%	
TDI	M. Usharaj	67	0.06%	
Margin of victory		41,094	37.24%	17.25%
Turnout		110,335	60.52%	−9.06%
Registered electors		185,710		
INC gain from DMK		Swing	22.30%	

=== 1989 ===
1989 Tamil Nadu Legislative Assembly election: Salem-I
Party	Candidate	Votes	%	±%
DMK	K. R. G. Dhanapalan	49,498	43.67%	−2.56%
Independent	C. N. K. A. Periasamy	26,837	23.68%	
INC	A. Thiruselvam	20,598	18.17%	
AIADMK	V. P. Eswaran	13,654	12.05%	−39.76%
BJP	A. Vaiyapuri	588	0.52%	
Independent	O. P. Damodharan	299	0.26%	
Independent	A. T. P. Chandrasekaran	234	0.21%	
Independent	V. Vijaya Sarathi Mohan	173	0.15%	
Independent	P. M. Selvakumaran	152	0.13%	
Independent	S. Prakasam	136	0.12%	
Independent	K. Manicka Achari	106	0.09%	
Margin of victory		22,661	19.99%	14.42%
Turnout		113,343	69.58%	−7.23%
Registered electors		164,974		
DMK gain from AIADMK		Swing	-8.13%	

=== 1984 ===
1984 Tamil Nadu Legislative Assembly election: Salem-I
Party	Candidate	Votes	%	±%
AIADMK	G. Krishnaraj	54,749	51.80%	−0.74%
DMK	G. K. Subasu	48,863	46.24%	
Independent	P. L. Rasan	790	0.75%	
Independent	C. S. Rajan	276	0.26%	
Independent	R. Ragunath	240	0.23%	
Independent	S. Venkatesa Iyer	127	0.12%	
Independent	N. Thiyagaraj	108	0.10%	
Independent	P. Sivalingam	84	0.08%	
Independent	S. R. V. Rajendran	80	0.08%	
Independent	P. K. Selvaraj	77	0.07%	
Independent	E. Alagiri	75	0.07%	
Margin of victory		5,886	5.57%	−14.25%
Turnout		105,683	76.81%	6.12%
Registered electors		141,927		
AIADMK hold		Swing	-0.74%	

=== 1980 ===
1980 Tamil Nadu Legislative Assembly election: Salem-I
Party	Candidate	Votes	%	±%
AIADMK	G. Krishnaraj	50,976	52.55%	14.34%
Independent	Amanullah Khan	31,745	32.72%	
JP	A. K. Palaniyeppan	12,391	12.77%	
BJP	S. A. Palanisami	597	0.62%	
Independent	V. Soundappan	467	0.48%	
Independent	S. R. V. Rajendran	286	0.29%	
Independent	M. Ganesadasan	228	0.24%	
Independent	O. R. A. Ramakrishnan	145	0.15%	
Independent	Balu (Alias) Balasubramaniam	123	0.13%	
Independent	T. K. Jayagopal	52	0.05%	
Margin of victory		19,231	19.82%	10.29%
Turnout		97,010	70.69%	8.11%
Registered electors		138,312		
AIADMK hold		Swing	14.34%	

=== 1977 ===
1977 Tamil Nadu Legislative Assembly election: Salem-I
Party	Candidate	Votes	%	±%
AIADMK	S. V. Varadarajan	34,708	38.21%	
JP	S. S. Mahadeva Mudaliar	26,046	28.67%	
DMK	P. S. Manickam	21,093	23.22%	−27.70%
INC	K. Mahadevan	8,135	8.95%	−38.23%
Independent	S. Jotheeswaran	281	0.31%	
Independent	P. S. Venugopal	261	0.29%	
Independent	S. K. Muthaiah	249	0.27%	
Independent	Theliammal	71	0.08%	
Margin of victory		8,662	9.54%	5.80%
Turnout		90,844	62.59%	−12.02%
Registered electors		146,078		
AIADMK gain from DMK		Swing	-12.72%	

=== 1971 ===
1971 Tamil Nadu Legislative Assembly election: Salem-I
Party	Candidate	Votes	%	±%
DMK	K. Jayaraman	46,262	50.92%	−7.00%
INC	P. Thiagarajan	42,867	47.19%	6.68%
ABJS	P. Ramakrishnan	1,718	1.89%	
Margin of victory		3,395	3.74%	−13.68%
Turnout		90,847	74.61%	−7.98%
Registered electors		123,835		
DMK hold		Swing	-7.00%	

=== 1967 ===
1967 Madras Legislative Assembly election: Salem-I
Party	Candidate	Votes	%	±%
DMK	K. Jayaraman	46,776	57.92%	11.76%
INC	P. Thiagarajan	32,710	40.51%	−10.16%
ABJS	N. P. Vasudevan	835	1.03%	
Independent	S. C. Gopal	432	0.53%	
Margin of victory		14,066	17.42%	12.91%
Turnout		80,753	82.59%	0.43%
Registered electors		99,374		
DMK gain from INC		Swing	7.25%	

=== 1962 ===
1962 Madras Legislative Assembly election: Salem-I
Party	Candidate	Votes	%	±%
INC	G. Venkataraman	43,726	50.67%	5.46%
DMK	E. R. Krishnan	39,838	46.16%	
ABJS	N. P. Vasudevan	2,732	3.17%	
Margin of victory		3,888	4.51%	4.13%
Turnout		86,296	82.16%	23.20%
Registered electors		106,662		
INC hold		Swing	5.46%	

=== 1957 ===
1957 Madras Legislative Assembly election: Salem-I
Party	Candidate	Votes	%	±%
INC	A. Mariappan Mudaliar	24,920	45.21%	
Independent	V. R. Nedunchezhiyan	24,713	44.83%	
CPI	Samuel	5,487	9.95%	
Margin of victory		207	0.38%	
Turnout		55,120	58.96%	
Registered electors		93,489		
INC win (new seat)				

=== 1952 ===
1952 Madras Legislative Assembly election: Salem Town
Party	Candidate	Votes	%	±%
INC	Varadarajulu Naidu	19,674	35.47%	
CPI	Mohan Kumaramangalam	17,554	31.65%	
Independent	Poorniah	9,090	16.39%	
Independent	Bali Chettiar	5,540	9.99%	
KMPP	Jagannathan	1,978	3.57%	
Socialist Party (India)	Rangaswamy	1,160	2.09%	
Independent	Krishnan	464	0.84%	
Margin of victory		2120	3.82%	
Turnout		55,460	67.25%	
INC win (new seat)				
