= Veerapandi Assembly constituency =

State Legislative Assembly Constituency in Tamil Nadu

Coordinates: 11°34′32″N 78°04′06″E

Veerapandi
- Constituency No. 91 for the Tamil Nadu Legislative Assembly

Constituency details
- Country: India
- Region: South India
- State: Tamil Nadu
- District: Salem
- Lok Sabha constituency: Salem
- Established: 1957
- Total electors: 2,50,504

Member of Legislative Assembly
- 17th Tamil Nadu Legislative Assembly
- Incumbent Palanivel. M.S
- Party: TVK
- Elected year: 2026

Veerapandi is a legislative assembly constituency in Salem district in the Indian state of Tamil Nadu. Its State Assembly Constituency number is 91. It comprises a portion of Salem taluk and is a part of the wider Salem Lok Sabha constituency for national elections to the Parliament of India. The constituency has been in existence since the 1957 election. It is one of the 234 State Legislative Assembly Constituencies in Tamil Nadu, India. Elections and winners in the constituency are listed below.

== Demographics ==
Demographics
| Category | Data |
|---|---|
| Created | 2016 |
| Vanniyar | 24% |
| Kongu Vellalar Gounder | 20% |
| Nadar | 17% |
| Senguntha kaikola Mudaliyar | 11% |
| Adi Dravida | 7% |
| Arunthathiyar | 05% |
| Others | 16% |
| Total Electorate | 2,39,268 |

== Members of Legislative Assembly ==
=== Madras State ===
| Year | Winner | Party |
|---|---|---|
| 1957 | M. R. Kandasami Mudaliar | Indian National Congress |
| 1962 | S. Arumugam | Dravida Munnetra Kazhagam |
| 1967 | S. Arumugam | Dravida Munnetra Kazhagam |

=== Tamil Nadu ===
| Year | Winner | Party |
|---|---|---|
| 1971 | S. Arumugam | Dravida Munnetra Kazhagam |
| 1977 | P. Venga Gounder | All India Anna Dravida Munnetra Kazhagam |
| 1980 | P. Vijayalakshmi | All India Anna Dravida Munnetra Kazhagam |
| 1984 | P. Vijayalakshmi | All India Anna Dravida Munnetra Kazhagam |
| 1989 | P. Venkatachalam | Dravida Munnetra Kazhagam |
| 1991 | K. Arjunan | All India Anna Dravida Munnetra Kazhagam |
| 1996 | S. Arumugam | Dravida Munnetra Kazhagam |
| 2001 | S. K. Selvam | All India Anna Dravida Munnetra Kazhagam |
| 2006 | A. Rajendran | Dravida Munnetra Kazhagam |
| 2011 | S. K. Selvam | All India Anna Dravida Munnetra Kazhagam |
| 2016 | P. Manonmani | All India Anna Dravida Munnetra Kazhagam |
| 2021 | M. Rajamuthu | All India Anna Dravida Munnetra Kazhagam |
| 2026 | Palanivel. M.S | Tamilaga Vettri Kazhagam |

== Election results ==
Vote share of winning candidates
| 2026 | 33.88% |
| 2021 | 50.24% |
| 2016 | 45.86% |
| 2011 | 55.73% |
| 2006 | 42.51% |
| 2001 | 58.38% |
| 1996 | 54.34% |
| 1991 | 68.12% |
| 1989 | 34.53% |
| 1984 | 63.70% |
| 1980 | 57.95% |
| 1977 | 44.87% |
| 1971 | 62.23% |
| 1967 | 66.11% |
| 1962 | 54.78% |
| 1957 | 55.21% |

=== 2026 ===
2026 Tamil Nadu Legislative Assembly election: Veerapandi
| Party | Candidate | Votes | % | ±% |
|---|---|---|---|---|
| TVK | M. S. Palanivel | 79,907 | 33.88 | New |
| AIADMK | Sri Balaji Sugumar. S | 75,836 | 32.15 | ▼18.09 |
| DMK | Tharun. A.K | 69,296 | 29.38 | ▼11.91 |
| NTK | Rajeshkumar. S | 6,820 | 2.89 | ▼1.52 |
| TVK | Bramamoorthi. M | 642 | 0.27 | New |
| NOTA | NOTA | 594 | 0.25 | ▼0.38 |
| Margin of victory | | 4,071 | 1.73 | ▼7.22 |
| Turnout | | 2,35,875 | 94.16 | ▲8.68 |
| Registered electors | | 2,50,504 | | ▼9,560 |
| TVK gain from AIADMK | | Swing | ▲33.88 | |

=== 2021 ===
2021 Tamil Nadu Legislative Assembly election: Veerapandi
| Party | Candidate | Votes | % | ±% |
|---|---|---|---|---|
| AIADMK | M. Rajamuthu | 111,682 | 50.24% | +4.39 |
| DMK | A. K. Tharun | 91,787 | 41.29% | +2.44 |
| NTK | S. Rajeshkumar | 9,806 | 4.41% | +3.81 |
| AMMK | S. K. Selvam | 4,986 | 2.24% | New |
| NOTA | NOTA | 1,409 | 0.63% | −0.73 |
| IJK | R. Amutha | 1,302 | 0.59% | New |
| Margin of victory | | 19,895 | 8.95% | 1.94% |
| Turnout | | 222,293 | 85.48% | −0.92% |
| Rejected ballots | | 1063 | 0.48% | |
| Registered electors | | 260,064 | | |
| AIADMK hold | | Swing | 4.39% | |

=== 2016 ===
2016 Tamil Nadu Legislative Assembly election: Veerapandi
| Party | Candidate | Votes | % | ±% |
|---|---|---|---|---|
| AIADMK | P. Manonmani | 94,792 | 45.86% | −9.87 |
| DMK | A. Rajendran | 80,311 | 38.85% | −2.13 |
| PMK | A. R. B. Samraj | 17,218 | 8.33% | New |
| CPI | A. Mohan | 6,483 | 3.14% | New |
| NOTA | NOTA | 2,828 | 1.37% | New |
| NTK | M. Sasi Kumar | 1,233 | 0.60% | New |
| KMDK | K. P. Kamaraaj | 1,198 | 0.58% | New |
| Margin of victory | | 14,481 | 7.01% | −7.74% |
| Turnout | | 206,718 | 86.40% | −2.73% |
| Registered electors | | 239,268 | | |
| AIADMK hold | | Swing | -9.87% | |

=== 2011 ===
2011 Tamil Nadu Legislative Assembly election: Veerapandi
| Party | Candidate | Votes | % | ±% |
|---|---|---|---|---|
| AIADMK | S. K. Selvam | 100,155 | 55.73% | +13.99 |
| DMK | A. Rajendran | 73,657 | 40.98% | −1.53 |
| Independent | M. Vaithi | 1,558 | 0.87% | New |
| Independent | K. Tamizharasan | 1,355 | 0.75% | New |
| Margin of victory | | 26,498 | 14.74% | 13.97% |
| Turnout | | 179,729 | 89.12% | 9.95% |
| Registered electors | | 201,660 | | |
| AIADMK gain from DMK | | Swing | 13.22% | |

=== 2006 ===
2006 Tamil Nadu Legislative Assembly election: Veerapandi
| Party | Candidate | Votes | % | ±% |
|---|---|---|---|---|
| DMK | A. Rajendran | 90,477 | 42.51% | +4.59 |
| AIADMK | P. Vijayalakshmi Palanisamy | 88,839 | 41.74% | −16.64 |
| DMDK | S. Salem Govindaraj | 28,254 | 13.27% | New |
| BJP | A. Annadurai | 1,576 | 0.74% | New |
| Margin of victory | | 1,638 | 0.77% | −19.68% |
| Turnout | | 212,846 | 79.18% | 8.14% |
| Registered electors | | 268,821 | | |
| DMK gain from AIADMK | | Swing | -15.87% | |

=== 2001 ===
2001 Tamil Nadu Legislative Assembly election: Veerapandi
| Party | Candidate | Votes | % | ±% |
|---|---|---|---|---|
| AIADMK | S. K. Selvam | 85,657 | 58.38% | +19.25 |
| DMK | Veerapandy S. Arumugam | 55,645 | 37.92% | −16.42 |
| MDMK | A. Anburajendran | 1,318 | 0.90% | −0.37 |
| Independent | S. Amirthalingam | 1,067 | 0.73% | New |
| Independent | V. Nehrurajan | 962 | 0.66% | New |
| Margin of victory | | 30,012 | 20.45% | 5.24% |
| Turnout | | 146,733 | 71.03% | 2.12% |
| Registered electors | | 206,595 | | |
| AIADMK gain from DMK | | Swing | 4.04% | |

=== 1996 ===
1996 Tamil Nadu Legislative Assembly election: Veerapandi
| Party | Candidate | Votes | % | ±% |
|---|---|---|---|---|
| DMK | Veerapandy S. Arumugam | 75,563 | 54.34% | +34.3 |
| AIADMK | K. Arjunan | 54,412 | 39.13% | −28.99 |
| PMK | M. Chinnappan | 6,303 | 4.53% | New |
| MDMK | Anbu Rajendran | 1,760 | 1.27% | New |
| Margin of victory | | 21,151 | 15.21% | −32.88% |
| Turnout | | 139,054 | 68.92% | 6.83% |
| Registered electors | | 210,273 | | |
| DMK gain from AIADMK | | Swing | -13.78% | |

=== 1991 ===
1991 Tamil Nadu Legislative Assembly election: Veerapandi
| Party | Candidate | Votes | % | ±% |
|---|---|---|---|---|
| AIADMK | K. Arjunan | 79,725 | 68.12% | +37.56 |
| DMK | P. Venkatachalam | 23,451 | 20.04% | −14.49 |
| PMK | M. Chinnappan | 11,799 | 10.08% | New |
| JP | P. Palaniappan | 798 | 0.68% | New |
| Margin of victory | | 56,274 | 48.09% | 44.12% |
| Turnout | | 117,028 | 62.09% | −1.25% |
| Registered electors | | 194,734 | | |
| AIADMK gain from DMK | | Swing | 33.59% | |

=== 1989 ===
1989 Tamil Nadu Legislative Assembly election: Veerapandi
| Party | Candidate | Votes | % | ±% |
|---|---|---|---|---|
| DMK | P. Venkatachalam | 36,040 | 34.53% | −0.16 |
| AIADMK | S. K. Selvam | 31,899 | 30.56% | −33.14 |
| INC | K. Mariappan | 20,291 | 19.44% | New |
| AIADMK | P. Vijayalakshmi | 10,635 | 10.19% | −53.52 |
| Independent | M. G. C. Prabhakar | 2,300 | 2.20% | New |
| Independent | N. Krishnamoorthy | 1,618 | 1.55% | New |
| Independent | M. Govindan | 673 | 0.64% | New |
| Margin of victory | | 4,141 | 3.97% | −25.05% |
| Turnout | | 104,369 | 63.34% | −8.81% |
| Registered electors | | 168,878 | | |
| DMK gain from AIADMK | | Swing | -29.17% | |

=== 1984 ===
1984 Tamil Nadu Legislative Assembly election: Veerapandi
| Party | Candidate | Votes | % | ±% |
|---|---|---|---|---|
| AIADMK | P. Vijayalakshmi | 61,609 | 63.70% | +5.75 |
| DMK | Subramaniam | 33,549 | 34.69% | −5.12 |
| Independent | C. Raja | 552 | 0.57% | New |
| Margin of victory | | 28,060 | 29.01% | 10.88% |
| Turnout | | 96,710 | 72.15% | 1.15% |
| Registered electors | | 141,355 | | |
| AIADMK hold | | Swing | 5.75% | |

=== 1980 ===
1980 Tamil Nadu Legislative Assembly election: Veerapandi
| Party | Candidate | Votes | % | ±% |
|---|---|---|---|---|
| AIADMK | P. Vijayalakshmi | 51,034 | 57.95% | +13.08 |
| DMK | K. P. Srinivasan | 35,061 | 39.81% | +14.31 |
| JP | M. M. Nallathambi | 1,331 | 1.51% | New |
| Independent | T. K. Thangavel | 508 | 0.58% | New |
| Margin of victory | | 15,973 | 18.14% | −1.23% |
| Turnout | | 88,061 | 71.00% | 9.83% |
| Registered electors | | 125,608 | | |
| AIADMK hold | | Swing | 13.08% | |

=== 1977 ===
1977 Tamil Nadu Legislative Assembly election: Veerapandi
| Party | Candidate | Votes | % | ±% |
|---|---|---|---|---|
| AIADMK | P. Venga Gounder | 31,920 | 44.87% | New |
| DMK | M. Muthuswamy | 18,144 | 25.50% | −36.72 |
| INC | T. V. Thirumalai | 10,777 | 15.15% | −12.6 |
| JP | P. C. Kolandavelu | 9,898 | 13.91% | New |
| Independent | R. Viruppannan | 401 | 0.56% | New |
| Margin of victory | | 13,776 | 19.36% | −15.11% |
| Turnout | | 71,140 | 61.17% | −6.99% |
| Registered electors | | 117,964 | | |
| AIADMK gain from DMK | | Swing | -17.36% | |

=== 1971 ===
1971 Tamil Nadu Legislative Assembly election: Veerapandi
| Party | Candidate | Votes | % | ±% |
|---|---|---|---|---|
| DMK | Veerapandy S. Arumugam | 41,369 | 62.23% | −3.88 |
| INC | T. V. Thirumalai | 18,449 | 27.75% | −6.13 |
| CPI(M) | K. Rangannan | 4,221 | 6.35% | New |
| Independent | M. Malaikolundupillai | 2,440 | 3.67% | New |
| Margin of victory | | 22,920 | 34.48% | 2.25% |
| Turnout | | 66,479 | 68.16% | −4.92% |
| Registered electors | | 101,883 | | |
| DMK hold | | Swing | -3.88% | |

=== 1967 ===
1967 Madras Legislative Assembly election: Veerapandi
| Party | Candidate | Votes | % | ±% |
|---|---|---|---|---|
| DMK | Veerapandy S. Arumugam | 42,681 | 66.11% | +11.33 |
| INC | N. S. Sundararajan | 21,876 | 33.89% | −5.5 |
| Margin of victory | | 20,805 | 32.23% | 16.83% |
| Turnout | | 64,557 | 73.08% | 0.73% |
| Registered electors | | 90,758 | | |
| DMK hold | | Swing | 11.33% | |

=== 1962 ===
1962 Madras Legislative Assembly election: Veerapandi
| Party | Candidate | Votes | % | ±% |
|---|---|---|---|---|
| DMK | Veerapandy S. Arumugam | 30,840 | 54.78% | New |
| INC | A. Mariappan | 22,171 | 39.39% | −15.82 |
| Independent | V. Siddha Chetty | 1,450 | 2.58% | New |
| Independent | K. Chinnathambi Gounder | 937 | 1.66% | New |
| Independent | K. Samuel | 895 | 1.59% | New |
| Margin of victory | | 8,669 | 15.40% | −9.26% |
| Turnout | | 56,293 | 72.35% | 20.62% |
| Registered electors | | 80,507 | | |
| DMK gain from INC | | Swing | -0.42% | |

=== 1957 ===
1957 Madras Legislative Assembly election: Veerapandi
| Party | Candidate | Votes | % | ±% |
|---|---|---|---|---|
| INC | M. R. Kandasamy Mudaliar | 21,264 | 55.21% | New |
| Independent | Chelliah | 11,765 | 30.54% | New |
| Independent | K. V. Palanisamy | 2,838 | 7.37% | New |
| Independent | Shanmuga Mudali | 1,589 | 4.13% | New |
| Independent | Muthusamy Konan | 1,062 | 2.76% | New |
| Margin of victory | | 9,499 | 24.66% | |
| Turnout | | 38,518 | 51.74% | |
| Registered electors | | 74,451 | | |
| INC win (new seat) | | | | |
