= P. Manonmani =

P. Manonmani is an Indian politician and a member of the Tamil Nadu Legislative Assembly. She was elected to the Tamil Nadu Legislative Assembly in the 2016 elections as a candidate of the All India Anna Dravida Munnetra Kazhagam (AIADMK) from the Veerapandi Assembly constituency.

== Electoral Performance ==
=== 2016 ===
2016 Tamil Nadu Legislative Assembly election: Veerapandi
Party	Candidate	Votes	%	±%
AIADMK	P. Manonmani	94,792	45.86%	−9.87
DMK	A. Rajendran	80,311	38.85%	−2.13
PMK	A. R. B. Samraj	17,218	8.33%	New
CPI	A. Mohan	6,483	3.14%	New
NOTA	NOTA	2,828	1.37%	New
NTK	M. Sasi Kumar	1,233	0.60%	New
KMDK	K. P. Kamaraaj	1,198	0.58%	New
Margin of victory		14,481	7.01%	−7.74%
Turnout		206,718	86.40%	−2.73%
Registered electors		239,268		
AIADMK hold		Swing	-9.87%	
