= L. Ravichandran =

Indian politician

L. Ravichandran was elected to the Tamil Nadu Legislative Assembly from the Salem-I constituency in the 2006 elections. He was a candidate of the All India Anna Dravida Munnetra Kazhagam (ADMK) party.
