= Godumalai =

Reserve Forest

Godumalai Forest Reserve
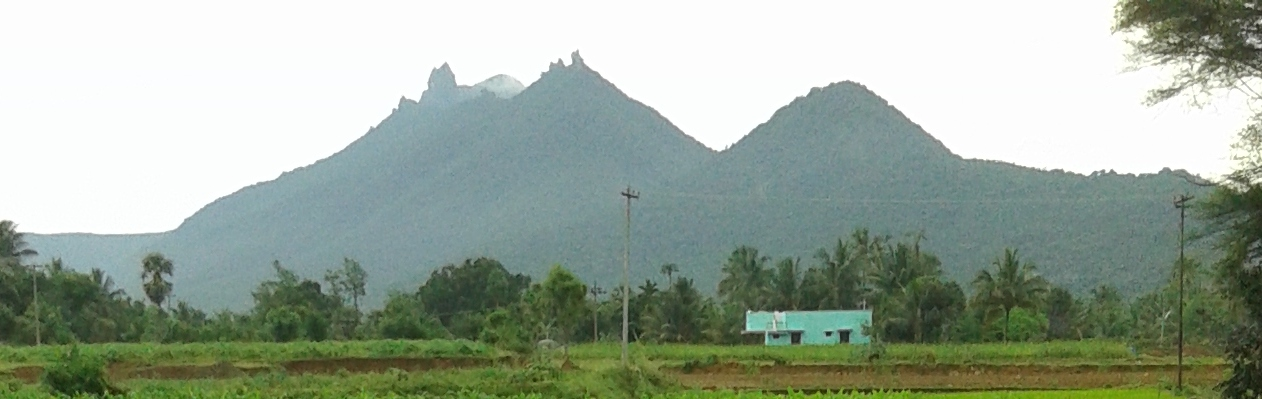
- Interactive map of Godumalai Forest Reserve
- Location: Salem, India
- Nearest city: Salem, India
- Coordinates: 11°40′55.38″N 78°21′2.96″E

Godumalai is a reserve forest and is located on the east side of Salem District of Tamil Nadu, India. The estimated terrain elevation is 553 meters above sea level. It located 20 km away from Salem town. Godumalai is also known as Godhamalai.

As per research data from Periyar University, Godumalai hill contains an estimated iron ore reserve of 12.7 million tonnes down to a depth of 30.5 meters, while the other regions around the hill are estimated to contain 10.7 million tonnes in the same depth.
