= A. Mariappan Mudaliar =

Indian politician and philanthropist

A. Mariappan Mudaliar is an Indian politician, philanthropist and was a Member of the Legislative Assembly of Tamil Nadu. He was elected to the Tamil Nadu legislative assembly as an Indian National Congress candidate from the Salem - I constituency in 1957.

He was born into the Sengunthar family in the Salem district.

Mariappan Mudaliar was president of the Ammapettai Handloom Weavers' Cooperative Society from 1952 to 1971. This cooperative society is the oldest and biggest in Tamil Nadu. The Society improved the economy of thousands of weavers.
