= K. Arjunan =

Indian politician

Kattiannan Arjunan

Member of Parliament, Lok Sabha
- In office 1980-1984
- Preceded by: Vazhappady K. Ramamurthy
- Succeeded by: M. Thambi Durai
- Constituency: Dharmapuri, Tamil Nadu

Member of Tamil Nadu Legislative Assembly
- In office 1989-1991
- Preceded by: S. Semmalai
- Succeeded by: R. Palanisamy
- Constituency: Taramangalam
- In office 1991-1996
- Preceded by: P. Venkatachalam
- Succeeded by: S. Arumugam
- Constituency: Veerapandi

Personal details
- Born: 22 September 1944 (age 81) M.N.Patti Village, Mettur Taluk, Salem District, Madras Presidency, British India
- Party: Anna Dravida Munnetra Kazhagam
- Other political affiliations: Dravida Munnetra Kazhagam
- Spouse: Kalavathi
- Education: Loyola College

Kattiannan Arjunan is an Indian politician of the All India Anna Dravida Munnetra Kazhagam (AIADMK).

== Politics ==
He was elected to the Lok Sabha the lower house of Indian Parliament from Dharmapuri in 1980 as a member of the Dravida Munnetra Kazhagam (DMK). He then joined the AIADMK.

Arjunan was elected as a Member of the legislative assembly(MLA) from Tharamangalam, Salem district on 1989 as a member of the AIADMK and again elected as a MLA from Veerapandi on 1991 as a member of the AIADMK.

== Early life ==
Arjunan was born on 22 September 1944 at M. N. Patti Village, Mettur Taluk of Salem District. He has a B.sc degree from Loyola college, Madras. He got married on 24 November 1969.

Arjunan served as a Sub-Inspector of Police from 1967 to 1978 and as a Deputy Inspector of Police from 1978 to 1979.
