= M. R. Kandasamy Mudaliar =

Indian politician

M. R. Kandasamy Mudaliar is an Indian politician, Textile merchant and former Member of the Legislative Assembly of Tamil Nadu from Veerapandi constituency as an Indian National Congress candidate in 1957 election. He was born in Sengunthar family in Salem district.
