= A. B. Sakthivel Mudaliar =

Indian politician

A. B. Sakthivel Mudaliar is an Indian politician and incumbent member of the Tamil Nadu Legislative Assembly from the Salem South constituency. He represents the All India Anna Dravida Munnetra Kazhagam party.
