= 2009 Indian general election in Puducherry =

Indian general election in Puducherry, 2009
- 13 May 2009 (5A phase)

1 seat
- Turnout: 79.81% (▲3.74)
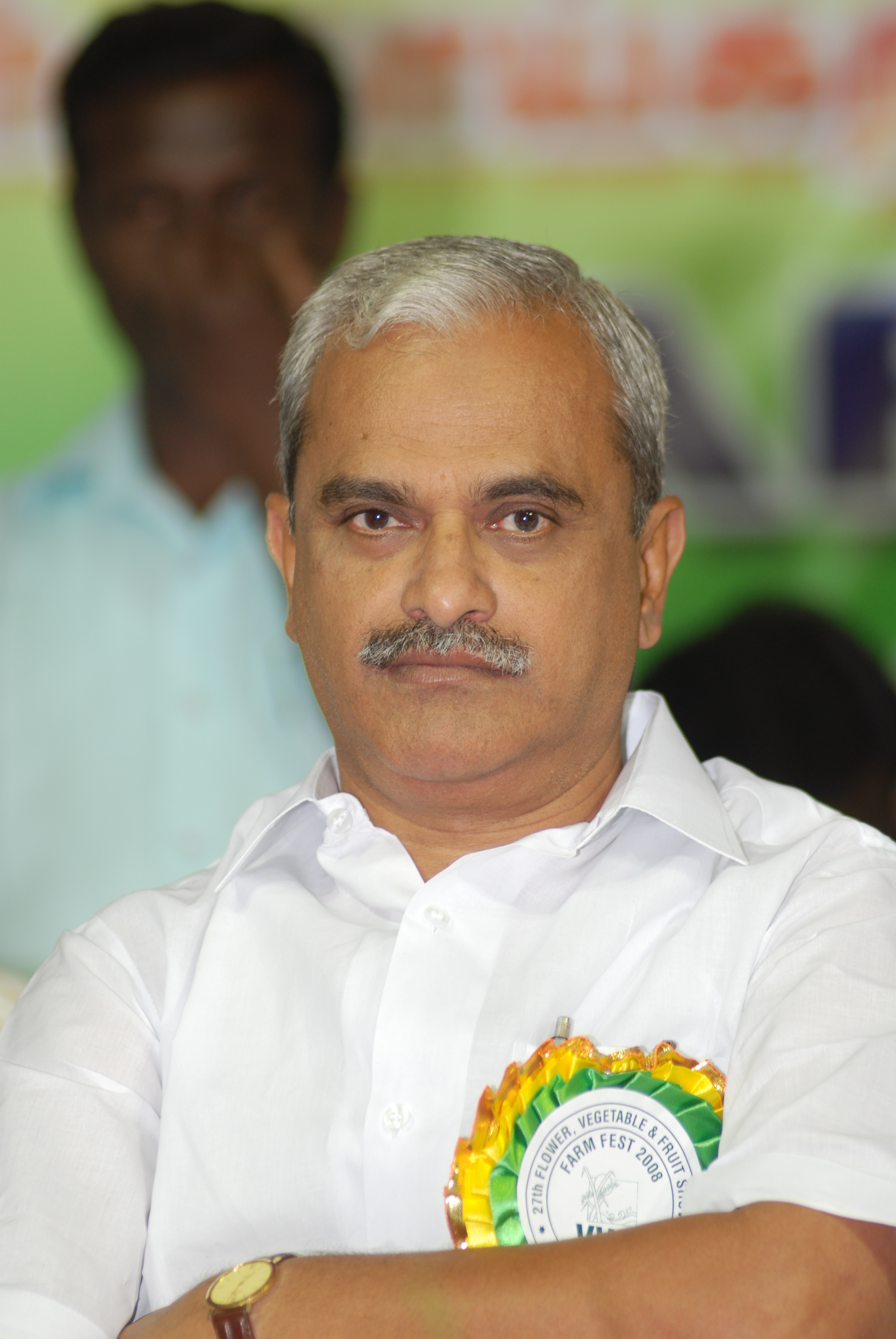

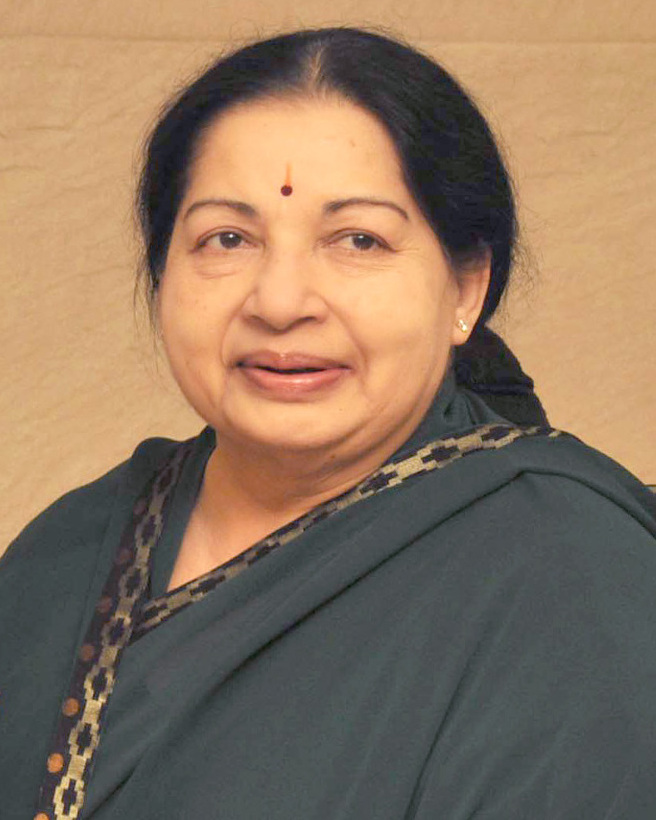
| | First party | Second party |
|---|---|---|
| Leader | V. Vaithilingam | J. Jayalalithaa |
| Party | INC | AIADMK |
| Alliance | UPA+DPA | TF |
| Seats won | 1 | 0 |
| Seat change | Steady | Steady |
| Popular vote | 300,391 | 208,619 |
| Percentage | 49.41% | 34.32% |

The 2009 Indian general election in Puducherry, occurred for 1 seat in the territory. The seat is part of the Puducherry constituency. The UPA, fielded Narayanswamy, of the Indian National Congress, while the Third Front fielded PMK incumbent candidate M. Ramadass. Due to the high Vanniyar population in Puducherry, many expected that it will be a bitter contest, unlike the previous election, when PMK was part of the UPA. The results reflected the general trend shown in Tamil Nadu, where DMK and its alliance UPA, were able to beat its rival ADMK and its allies which are part of the Third Front. The results here also reflects the poor performance of PMK in this election, losing all 7 seats, it contested in Tamil Nadu, as opposed to winning all of its 6 seats in the last election.

== Candidates ==
| Constituency | | | | | | | |
| Constituency | | UPA | | UNPA | | Others | |
| 1 | Puducherry | INC | V. Narayanasamy | PMK | M. Ramadass | DMDK | K. A. U. Asanaa |
| 1 | Puducherry | INC | V. Narayanasamy | PMK | M. Ramadass | BJP | M. Visweswaran |

== Full Results ==
=== Results by Party ===
Source: Election Commission of India

| Party Name | Popular vote | | | Seats | | |
| Party Name | Votes | % | ±pp | Contested | Won | +/− |
|---|---|---|---|---|---|---|
| INC | 3,00,391 | 49.41 | New | 1 | 1 | ▲1 |
| PMK | 2,08,619 | 34.32 | ▼15.63 | 1 | 0 | ▼1 |
| DMDK | 52,638 | 8.66 | New | 1 | 0 | Steady |
| BJP | 13,442 | 2.21 | ▼33.44 | 1 | 0 | Steady |
| Others | 6,845 | 1.13 | Steady | 6 | 0 | Steady |
| IND | 26,013 | 4.28 | ▼2.99 | 18 | 0 | Steady |
| Total | 6,07,948 | 100% | - | 28 | 1 | - |

=== Detailed Result ===
| Constituency | | Winner | | | | Runner-up | | | | Margin | |
| Constituency | | Candidate | Party | Votes | % | Candidate | Party | Votes | % | Votes | % |
|---|---|---|---|---|---|---|---|---|---|---|---|
| 1 | Puducherry | Narayanasamy | INC | 3,00,391 | 49.41 | M. Ramadass | PMK | 2,08,619 | 34.32 | 91,772 | 15.09 |

== Post-election Union Council of Ministers from Puducherry ==
| # | Name | Constituency | Designation | Department | From | To | Party |
|---|---|---|---|---|---|---|---|
| 1 | V. Narayanasamy | Puducherry (Lok Sabha) | MoS | Parliamentary Affairs | 28 May 2009 | 12 July 2011 | INC |
| 1 | V. Narayanasamy | Puducherry (Lok Sabha) | MoS | Planning | 28 May 2009 | 19 January 2011 | INC |
| 1 | V. Narayanasamy | Puducherry (Lok Sabha) | MoS | Personnel, Public Grievances and Pensions | 15 November 2010 | 26 May 2014 | INC |
| 1 | V. Narayanasamy | Puducherry (Lok Sabha) | MoS | Prime Minister's Office | 19 January 2011 | 26 May 2014 | INC |

== Assembly Seat wise leads ==
| Constituency | | Winner | | | Runner-up | | | Margin |
| # | Name | Candidate | Party | Votes | Candidate | Party | Votes | Margin |
|---|---|---|---|---|---|---|---|---|
| 1 | Mannadipet | V. Narayanasamy | INC | 10,585 | M. Ramadass | PMK | 8,552 | 2,033 |
| 2 | Thirubuvanai (SC) | V. Narayanasamy | INC | 9,957 | M. Ramadass | PMK | 7,859 | 2,098 |
| 3 | Oussudu (SC) | V. Narayanasamy | INC | 10,668 | M. Ramadass | PMK | 6,642 | 4,026 |
| 4 | Mangalam | V. Narayanasamy | INC | 11,931 | M. Ramadass | PMK | 8,809 | 3,122 |
| 5 | Villianur | V. Narayanasamy | INC | 12,050 | M. Ramadass | PMK | 6,597 | 5,453 |
| 6 | Ozhukarai | V. Narayanasamy | INC | 8,694 | M. Ramadass | PMK | 6,934 | 1,760 |
| 7 | Kadirgamam | M. Ramadass | PMK | 9,731 | V. Narayanasamy | INC | 6,015 | 3,716 |
| 8 | Indira Nagar | M. Ramadass | PMK | 11,422 | V. Narayanasamy | INC | 5,139 | 6,283 |
| 9 | Thattanchavady | M. Ramadass | PMK | 8,141 | V. Narayanasamy | INC | 6,972 | 1,169 |
| 10 | Kamaraj Nagar | V. Narayanasamy | INC | 7,433 | M. Ramadass | PMK | 6,365 | 1,068 |
| 11 | Lawspet | V. Narayanasamy | INC | 6,976 | M. Ramadass | PMK | 6,282 | 694 |
| 12 | Kalapet | V. Narayanasamy | INC | 8,350 | M. Ramadass | PMK | 8,124 | 226 |
| 13 | Muthialpet | V. Narayanasamy | INC | 8,942 | M. Ramadass | PMK | 7,105 | 1,837 |
| 14 | Raj Bhavan | V. Narayanasamy | INC | 10,008 | M. Ramadass | PMK | 5,123 | 4,885 |
| 15 | Oupalam | M. Ramadass | PMK | 9,591 | V. Narayanasamy | INC | 7,678 | 1,913 |
| 16 | Orleanpeth | V. Narayanasamy | INC | 9,314 | M. Ramadass | PMK | 5,081 | 4,233 |
| 17 | Nellithope | V. Narayanasamy | INC | 9,651 | M. Ramadass | PMK | 7,295 | 2,356 |
| 18 | Mudaliarpet | M. Ramadass | PMK | 9,072 | V. Narayanasamy | INC | 9,061 | 11 |
| 19 | Ariankuppam | V. Narayanasamy | INC | 10,310 | M. Ramadass | PMK | 9,858 | 452 |
| 20 | Manavely | V. Narayanasamy | INC | 9,997 | M. Ramadass | PMK | 9,449 | 548 |
| 21 | Embalam (SC) | V. Narayanasamy | INC | 13,593 | M. Ramadass | PMK | 6,014 | 7,579 |
| 22 | Nettpakkam (SC) | V. Narayanasamy | INC | 14,144 | M. Ramadass | PMK | 5,618 | 8,526 |
| 23 | Bahour | V. Narayanasamy | INC | 10,296 | M. Ramadass | PMK | 7,728 | 2,568 |
| 24 | Nedungadu (SC) | V. Narayanasamy | INC | 10,832 | M. Ramadass | PMK | 5,172 | 5,660 |
| 25 | Thirunallar | V. Narayanasamy | INC | 10,437 | M. Ramadass | PMK | 5,490 | 4,947 |
| 26 | Karaikal North | V. Narayanasamy | INC | 8,965 | M. Ramadass | PMK | 4,318 | 4,647 |
| 27 | Karaikal South | V. Narayanasamy | INC | 9,808 | M. Ramadass | PMK | 1,887 | 7,921 |
| 28 | Neravy T.R. Pattinam | V. Narayanasamy | INC | 10,901 | M. Ramadass | PMK | 4,750 | 6,151 |
| 29 | Mahe | V. Narayanasamy | INC | 12,170 | M. Ramadass | PMK | 5,654 | 6,516 |
| 30 | Yanam | V. Narayanasamy | INC | 19,489 | M. Ramadass | PMK | 3,952 | 15,537 |

== See also ==
Brisk polling in Tamil Nadu, Puducherry
