= List of Rajya Sabha members from Puducherry =

Members of the Upper House of Parliament from Puducherry

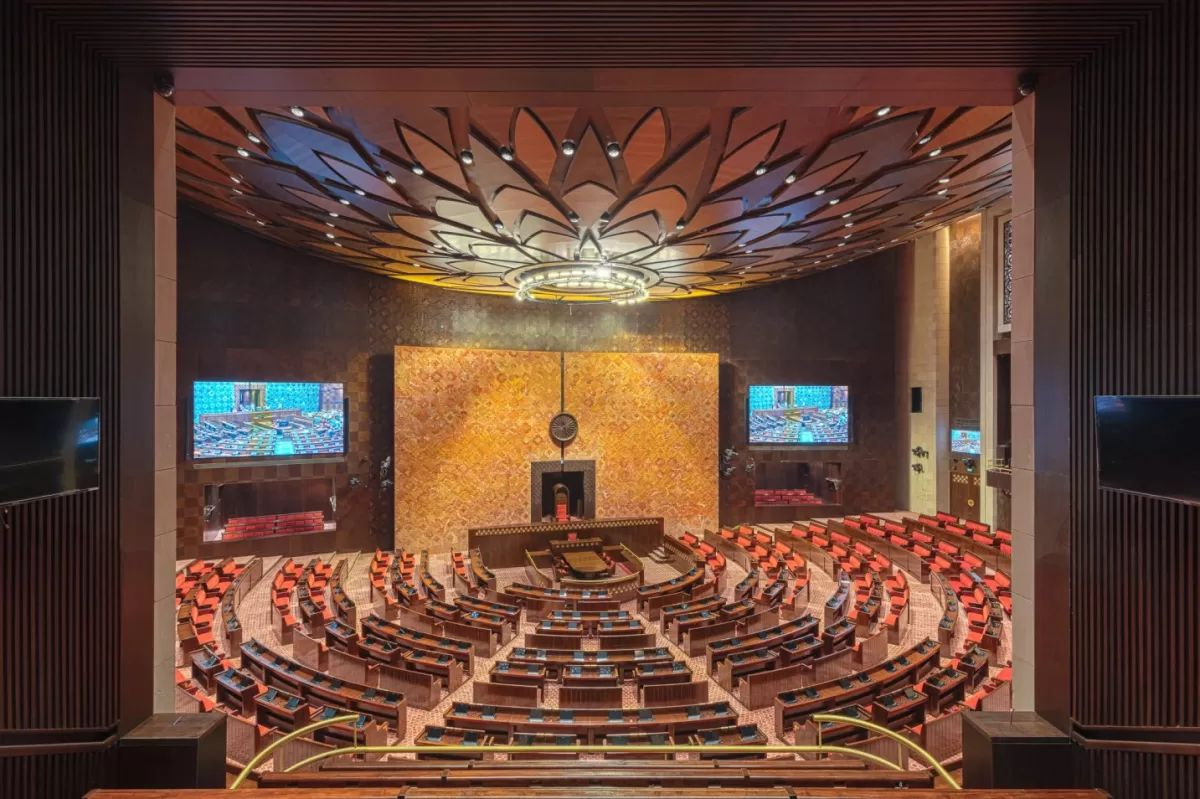
Rajya Sabha
(Council of States)

Members of parliament in the Rajya Sabha (Council of States) from Puducherry are not directly elected by being voted upon by all adult citizens of the state but by the members of the Puducherry Legislative Assembly. Candidates who win the Rajya Sabha elections are called "Members of Parliament" and hold their seats for six years. The house meets in the Rajya Sabha Chamber of the Sansad Bhavan in New Delhi on matters relating to the creation of new laws or removing or improving the existing laws that affect all citizens of India. Elections take place to elect one member from Puducherry.

== Current member ==
Source: Digital Sansad

No.	Name	Political party	Alliance	Date of		Total Term
No.	Name	Political party	Alliance	Appointment	Retirement	Total Term
1	S. Selvaganabathy	Bharatiya Janata Party	NDA	7 October 2021	6 October 2027	1

== Chronological list of all members ==
Name	Political party	Date of		Total Term	Vacation Date/Reason
Name	Political party	Appointment	Retirement	Total Term	Vacation Date/Reason
S. Selvaganabathy	BJP	7 October 2021	6 October 2027	1	Incumbent
N. Gokulakrishnan	AIADMK	7 October 2015	6 October 2021	1	Retirement
P. Kannan	INC	7 October 2009	6 October 2015	1	Retirement
V. Narayanasamy	INC	7 October 2003	6 October 2009	3	Elected to LS on 16 May 2009
C. P. Thirunavukkarasu	DMK	7 October 1997	6 October 2003	1	Retirement
V. Narayanasamy	INC	5 August 1991	4 August 1997	2	Retirement
V. Narayanasamy	INC	5 August 1985	4 August 1991	1	Retirement
V. P. M. Samy	AIADMK	28 July 1977	27 July 1983	1	Retirement
S. Sivaprakasam	DMK	7 August 1969	6 August 1975	1	Retirement
P. Abraham	INC	7 August 1963	6 August 1969	1	Retirement

== See also ==
- List of current members of the Rajya Sabha
- List of nominated members of the Rajya Sabha
