= Secular Social Justice Victory Alliance =

Indian political alliance

- மதச்சார்பற்ற சமூகநீதி வெற்றிக் கூட்டணி Secular Social Justice Victory Alliance
- Abbreviation: SSJVA
- Chairman: C. Joseph Vijay
- Founder: C. Joseph Vijay; Manickam Tagore; Thol. Thirumavalavan; K. M. Kader Mohideen; Vaiko
- Founded: 6 May 2026 (6 months ago)
- Headquarters: 8th Avenue, Panaiyur, Chennai, Tamil Nadu, India – 600119
- Ideology: Egalitarianism; Secularism; Social justice
- Political position: Centre-left
- Colours: Dark Red; Sky Blue
- ECI status: Not Required
- Seats in Rajya Sabha: 3 / 19
- Seats in Lok Sabha: 14 / 40
- Seats in State Legislative Assemblies: 118 / 234 (Tamil Nadu Legislative Assembly) 4 / 33 (Puducherry Legislative Assembly)
- Number of states and union territories in government: 1 / 31

The Secular Social Justice Victory Alliance (SSJVA) is an Indian regional political alliance in the state of Tamil Nadu and the union territory Puducherry led by Tamilaga Vettri Kazhagam (TVK). It was founded by TVK President C. Joseph Vijay in 2026. The alliance was formed as part of an attempt to form a popular government that fulfills the simple-majority requirement.

== History ==
In March 2026, TVK and Neyam Makkal Kazhagam (NMK) contested the 2026 Puducherry Legislative Assembly election as part of an alliance led by TVK. Under the seat-sharing agreement, NMK was allotted two constituencies: Orleampeth and Thattanchavady.

In May, following a hung assembly in the 2026 Tamil Nadu Legislative Assembly election, TVK, led by Vijay, invited the Indian National Congress (INC), Viduthalai Chiruthaigal Katchi (VCK), Indian Union Muslim League (IUML), Communist Party of India (Marxist), and Communist Party of India (CPI) to form the government.

On 6 May, the INC agreed to form an alliance with TVK, stating that the alliance would “bring back the legacy of K. Kamaraj, the social justice ideals of Periyar E. V. Ramasamy, and the constitutional principles of B. R. Ambedkar in Tamil Nadu.”

On 21 May, the IUML formally nominated sitting MLA A. M. Shahjahan for a cabinet position in the TVK-led government. This decision was announced by national president K. M. Kader Mohideen, signifying the party's departure from the DMK-led Secular Progressive Alliance. On the same day, the VCK, in coordination with the IUML, formally nominated sitting MLA Vanni Arasu for a cabinet position in the TVK-led government. This decision signifies the party's departure from the Secular Progressive Alliance. The Left parties subsequently declared that they were no longer part of the DMK alliance. On 9 September 2026, TVK-led front was formally named "Secular Social Justice Victory Alliance".

== List of members ==
| No. | Political party | Flag | Election symbol | National Alliance | State/Local Leader | National Leader | ECI Status | | | | | |
|---|---|---|---|---|---|---|---|---|---|---|---|---|
| No. | Political party | Flag | Election symbol | National Alliance | State/Local Leader | National Leader | ECI Status | 1 | Tamilaga Vettri Kazhagam | Indian National Developmental Inclusive Alliance (INDIA) | C. Joseph Vijay (Tamil Nadu) | State Party in Puducherry and Tamil Nadu |
| 2 | Indian National Congress | | | Manickam Tagore (Tamil Nadu) V. Vaithilingam (Puducherry) | Mallikarjun Kharge | National Party | | | | Indian National Developmental Inclusive Alliance (INDIA) | | |
| 3 | Viduthalai Chiruthaigal Katchi | | | Thol. Thirumavalavan (Tamil Nadu) | | State Party in Tamil Nadu. Registered Unrecognised in Puducherry | | | | Indian National Developmental Inclusive Alliance (INDIA) | | |
| 4 | Indian Union Muslim League | | | K. M. Kader Mohideen (Tamil Nadu) | | Registered Unrecognised in Tamil Nadu and Puducherry | | | | Indian National Developmental Inclusive Alliance (INDIA) | | |
| 5 | Marumalarchi Dravida Munnetra Kazhagam | | | Durai Vaiko | | Registered Unrecognised in Tamil Nadu | | | | Indian National Developmental Inclusive Alliance (INDIA) | | |
| 6 | Neyam Makkal Kazhagam | | | G. Nehru Kuppusamy | | Registered Unrecognised in Puducherry | | | | Indian National Developmental Inclusive Alliance (INDIA) | | |

== Outside support and confidence ==
The following parties and one independent have provided unconditional outside support and confidence in the Tamil Nadu Legislative Assembly to form a stable government led by the TVK. Initially, the All India Anna Dravida Munnetra Kazhagam (Rebel Faction), comprising 25 MLAs out of AIADMK's total 47, pledged its support to TVK and stated it supports no other party, thus indicating its departure from the parent AIADMK-led Alliance as well as the BJP-led NDA at the national level. The faction leaders patched up with the parent organization led by Edappadi K. Palaniswami and this resulted in taking back the support for the government.

| No. | Political party | Flag | Election symbol | State Alliance | National Alliance | State/Local Leader | National Leader | Seats | | | | ECI Status |
| No. | Political party | Flag | Election symbol | State Alliance | National Alliance | State/Local Leader | National Leader | Lok Sabha in TN and PY | Rajya Sabha in TN and PY | Tamil Nadu Legislative Assembly | Puducherry Legislative Assembly | ECI Status |
|---|---|---|---|---|---|---|---|---|---|---|---|---|
| 1 | Communist Party of India (Marxist) | | | Left Front | Indian National Developmental Inclusive Alliance (INDIA) | P. Shanmugam (Tamil Nadu) | M. A. Baby | 2 / 40 | 0 / 19 | 2 / 234 | 0 / 30 | National Party |
| 2 | Communist Party of India | | | Left Front | Indian National Developmental Inclusive Alliance (INDIA) | M. Veerapandian (Tamil Nadu) | D. Raja | 2 / 40 | 0 / 19 | 2 / 234 | 0 / 30 | State Party in Tamil Nadu |
| 3 | Others | Independent | | | | | | 0 / 40 | 0 / 19 | 1 / 234 | 0 / 30 | NA |
| Total | | | | | | | | 4 / 40 | 0 / 19 | 5 / 234 | 0 / 30 | Steady |

== Strength in Legislative Assemblies ==
| No. | Political party | Tamil Nadu Legislative Assembly | Puducherry Legislative Assembly |
|---|---|---|---|
| 1 | Tamilaga Vettri Kazhagam | 109 / 234 | 2 / 30 |
| 2 | Indian National Congress | 5 / 234 | 1 / 30 |
| 3 | Viduthalai Chiruthaigal Katchi | 2 / 234 | 0 / 30 |
| 4 | Indian Union Muslim League | 2 / 234 | 0 / 30 |
| 5 | Marumalarchi Dravida Munnetra Kazhagam | 0 / 234 | 0 / 30 |
| 6 | Neyam Makkal Kazhagam | 0 / 234 | 1 / 30 |
| Total | | 118 / 234 | 4 / 30 |

== Strength in Parliament ==
| No. | Political party | Seats | |
| No. | Political party | Lok Sabha in TN and PY | Rajya Sabha in TN and PY |
|---|---|---|---|
| 1 | Indian National Congress | 10 / 40 | 3 / 19 |
| 2 | Viduthalai Chiruthaigal Katchi | 2 / 40 | 0 / 19 |
| 3 | Indian Union Muslim League | 1 / 40 | 0 / 19 |
| 4 | Marumalarchi Dravida Munnetra Kazhagam | 1 / 40 | 0 / 19 |
| Total | | 14 / 40 | 3 / 19 |

== Governments ==
List of current SSJV Alliance governments

| S.No. | State/UT | SSJV Alliance Govt. since | Chief Minister | | | | Alliance Partners | Outside Support & Confidence | Total Seats | Last Election |
| S.No. | State/UT | SSJV Alliance Govt. since | Name | Party | Seats | Since | Alliance Partners | Outside Support & Confidence | Total Seats | Last Election |
|---|---|---|---|---|---|---|---|---|---|---|
| 1. | Tamil Nadu (list) | May 10, 2026 | C. Joseph Vijay | Tamilaga Vettri Kazhagam | 109 / 234 | May 4, 2026 | Indian National Congress 5 / 234 | Communist Party of India (Marxist) 2 / 234 | 123 / 234 | May 4, 2026 |
| 1. | Tamil Nadu (list) | May 10, 2026 | C. Joseph Vijay | Tamilaga Vettri Kazhagam | 109 / 234 | May 4, 2026 | Viduthalai Chiruthaigal Katchi 2 / 234 | Communist Party of India 2 / 234 | 123 / 234 | May 4, 2026 |
| 1. | Tamil Nadu (list) | May 10, 2026 | C. Joseph Vijay | Tamilaga Vettri Kazhagam | 109 / 234 | May 4, 2026 | Indian Union Muslim League 2 / 234 | Others 1 / 234 | 123 / 234 | May 4, 2026 |

== See also ==
- AINRC-led Alliance
- National Democratic Alliance
- DMK-led alliance
- Indian National Developmental Inclusive Alliance
