= V. Saminathan =

Indian politician

Nominated Member of the Puducherry Legislative Assembly
- In office 4 July 2017 – 20 February 2021
- Preceded by: M. Visweswaran
- Succeeded by: K. Venkatesan
- Constituency: Nominated

President of the Bharatiya Janata Party, Puducherry
- In office 12 January 2016 – 25 September 2023
- Preceded by: M. Visweswaran
- Succeeded by: S. Selvaganapathy

Personal details
- Party: Tamilaga Vettri Kazhagam (Since 2025 -)
- Other political affiliations: Bhartiya Janata Party (1990 - 2025)

V. Saminathan is an Indian politician and member of the Tamilaga Vettri Kazhagam. He's formerly a president of Pondicherry BJP. Saminathan is a member of the Puducherry Legislative Assembly from 4 July 2017 as Nominated by Central Government of India.

V. Saminathan was serving BJP from last 1990s and he is the seniormost of BJP Pondicherry. He was elected as BJP Pondicherry State President three times. He's a prominent leader in Puducherry who belongs to Sengunthar. He is a popular Neta from Lawspet constituency, Puducherry. He contested 2016 Puducherry Legislative Assembly election from Lawspet constituency and got 8,891 votes. He is the ex President of BJP Puducherry unit.
