= K. Venkatesan =

Indian politician

Nominated Member of Puducherry Legislative Assembly
- Incumbent
- Assumed office May 11, 2021
- Preceded by: V. Saminathan

Member of Puducherry Legislative Assembly
- In office 2019–2021
- Preceded by: Ashok Anand
- Succeeded by: N. Rangaswamy
- Constituency: Thattanchavady

Personal details
- Born: K. Venkatesan
- Party: Bharatiya Janata Party
- Other political affiliations: Dravida Munnetra Kazhagam
- Education: 8th
- Profession: Businessman

K. Venkatesan is an Indian politician. He was elected to the Puducherry Legislative Assembly from Thattanchavady, Puducherry in the by-election in 2019 by a narrow margin of about 1000 votes as a member of the Dravida Munnetra Kazhagam.

During the 2021 Puducherry political crisis 2021, Venkatesan was one of the six MLAs who resigned from the Assembly, which led to the fall of V. Narayanasamy's Congress government in the Union Territory of Puducherry.

In May 2021, Venkatesan became a member of the Puducherry Legislative Assembly from May 11, 2021, as he was nominated by the Central Government of India.
