= Providence Mall =

Coordinates: 11.9286661°N 79.817829°E

- Location: Cuddalore Road, Ambedkar Nagar, Orleanpet, Puducherry, India
- Opened: 12 November 2017
- Owner: Prashanth Properties Private Limited
- Architect: Cheralathan Associates

Providence Mall is a shopping mall in Pondicherry promoted by Prashanth Properties Private Limited. Its total area is 0.25 million square feet. The rather small mall contains shops, sale outlets, a food court and a cinema. It was inaugurated on 12 November 2017 by V. Narayanasamy, the Chief Minister of Puducherry.
