= B. Ravicoumar =

Indian politician

Member of the Puducherry Legislative Assembly
- Incumbent
- Assumed office 2026
- Preceded by: R. Siva
- Constituency: Villianur

Personal details
- Party: All India N. R. Congress
- Profession: Politician

B. Ravicoumar is an Indian politician and member of the All India N. R. Congress. He was elected as a Member of the Puducherry Legislative Assembly from the Villianur constituency in the 2026 Puducherry Legislative Assembly election.
