= Bharatiya Janata Party – Puducherry =

Puducherry affiliate of the Bharatiya Janata Party

Bharatiya Janata Party – Puducherry பாரதிய ஜனதா பார்ட்டி, புதுச்சேரி
- President: V. P. Ramalingam
- Founder: Atal Bihari Vajpayee; L. K. Advani
- Founded: 6 April 1980 (46 years ago)
- Headquarters: Pandit Deendayal Upadhyaya Bhavan, Plot No. 45-46, 3rd Cross, Sithananda Nagar, Pondicherry-605005, Puducherry, India
- Youth wing: Bharatiya Janata Yuva Morcha, Puducherry
- Women's wing: BJP Mahila Morcha, Puducherry
- Ideology: Integral humanism; Social conservatism; Economic nationalism; Cultural nationalism; Hindu nationalism
- Colours: Saffron
- Alliance: National Democratic Alliance
- Seats in Rajya Sabha: 1 / 1
- Seats in Lok Sabha: 0 / 1
- Seats in Puducherry Legislative Assembly: 7 / 33

Election symbol

Party flag

The Bharatiya Janata Party – Puducherry (or BJP Puducherry) is the state unit of the Bharatiya Janata Party in Puducherry. Its head office is situated at Pandit Deendayal Upadhyaya Bhavan, Plot No 45,46, Sithananda Nagar, Puducherry-605005. The current president of BJP Puducherry is V. P. Ramalingam.

== Electoral Performance ==
=== Rajya Sabha Members ===
No.	Name	Term start	Term end	Term
1.	S. Selvaganapathy	4-Oct-2021	Incumbent	1

=== List of Speakers of Puducherry Legislative Assembly ===
No.	Name	Term start	Term end	Term
1.	Embalam R. Selvam	16-Jun-2021	Incumbent	1

=== Lok Sabha Election ===
Year	Party leader	Seats contested	Seats won	Change in seats	Result
2024	A. Namassivayam	1	0	0	Government
2019	Not contested but supported to AINRC				Government
2014	Not contested but supported to AINRC				Government
2009	M. Visweswaran	1	0	0	Opposition
2004	Lalitha Kumaramangalam	1	0	0	Opposition
1999	Not contested but supported to PMK				Government
1998	Not contested				Government
1996	S. Thiyagarajan	1	0	0	Government, later Opposition
1991	J. R. Ramasami	1	0	0	Opposition

=== Legislative Assembly Election ===
Year	Assembly	Seats contested	Seats won	(+/-) in seats	% of votes	Vote swing	Popular vote	Alliance	Outcome
1985	7th	3	0 / 30	New entry	0.05%	New entry	158	None	Lost
1990	8th	8	0 / 30	Steady	0.51%	▲0.46	2,154	None	Lost
1991	9th	12	0 / 30	Steady	0.78%	▲0.27	3,045	None	Lost
1996	10th	14	0 / 30	Steady	1.13%	▲0.35	5,217	None	Lost
2001	11th	5	1 / 30	▲1	4.65%	▲3.52	22,164	DMK+	Opposition
2006	12th	27	0 / 30	▼1	3.07%	▼1.58	17,356	None	Lost
2011	13th	20	0 / 30	Steady	1.32%	▼1.75	9,183	None	Lost
2016	14th	30	0 / 30	Steady	2.41%	▲1.09	19,303	None	Lost
2021	15th	9	6 / 30	▲6	13.66%	▲11.25	1,14,298	AINRC+	Government
2026	16th	10	4 / 30	▼2	12.19%	▼1.47	1,05,583	AINRC+	Government

== See also ==
- Bharatiya Janata Party
- National Democratic Alliance
- Puducherry Legislative Assembly
- All India N.R. Congress
