= Villianur Assembly constituency =

Constituency of the Puducherry legislative assembly in India

Coordinates: 11.910°N 79.758°E

Villianur
- Constituency No. 5 for the Puducherry Legislative Assembly
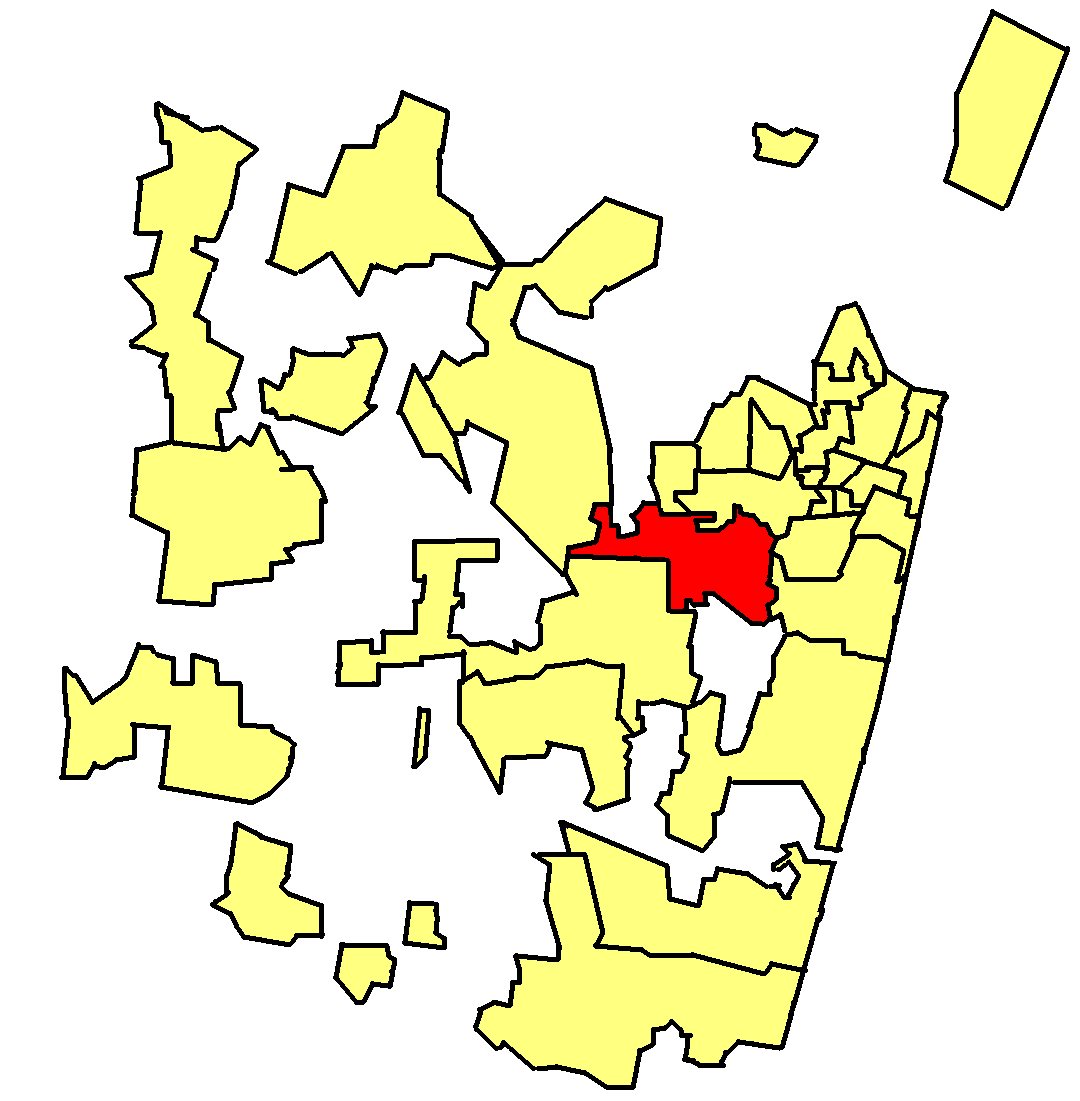

Constituency details
- Country: India
- Region: South India
- Union Territory: Puducherry
- District: Puducherry
- Lok Sabha constituency: Puducherry
- Established: 1964
- Total electors: 42,329
- Reservation: None

Member of Legislative Assembly
- 16th Puducherry Legislative Assembly
- Incumbent R. Siva
- Party: DMK
- Elected year: 2021

Villianur is a legislative assembly constituency in the Union territory of Puducherry in India. Villianur Assembly constituency is part of Puducherry Lok Sabha constituency.

== Members of the Legislative Assembly ==
Year	Member	Party
1964	Thillai Kanakarasu	Indian National Congress
1969	S. Arumugam	Dravida Munnetra Kazhagam
1974	M. K. Jeevarathina Odayar	Indian National Congress
1977	S. Pazhaninathan	All India Anna Dravida Munnetra Kazhagam
1980	M. Venugopal	Dravida Munnetra Kazhagam
1985	R. Subbaraya Gounder	Indian National Congress
1990	P. Anandabaskaran	Indian National Congress
1991	P. Anandabaskaran	Indian National Congress
1996	C. Jayakumar	Tamil Maanila Congress (Moopanar)
2001	C. Jayakumar	Tamil Maanila Congress (Moopanar)
2006	J. Narayanasamy	Independent politician
2011	A. Namassivayam	Indian National Congress
2016	A. Namassivayam	Indian National Congress
2021	R. Siva	Dravida Munnetra Kazhagam
2026	Ravikumar	All India N.R. Congress

== Election results ==
Vote share of winning candidates
2021	55.73%
2016	57.09%
2011	52.03%
2006	49.35%
2001	50.51%
1996	64.56%
1991	54.09%
1990	54.30%
1985	52.34%
1980	44.23%
1977	35.00%
1974	37.00%
1969	59.95%
1964	57.70%

=== 2026 ===
2026 Puducherry Legislative Assembly election: Villianur
Party	Candidate	Votes	%	±%
AINRC	B. Ravicoumar	16,970	43.13	
DMK	R. Siva	15,000	38.12	
TVK	R. Ramesh	6,248	15.88	
NOTA	None of the above	266	0.68	
PMK	V. Krishnamoorthy	82	0.21	
IND	Shakul Hamed	77	0.20	
AIPTMMK	M. Nandagopal	55	0.14	
IND	D. Pavithiran	37	0.09	
IND	S. Hari Suresh Babu	35	0.09	
IND	A. Thiyagu	25	0.06	
IND	S. Jayapal	17	0.04	
IND	M. Ganapathy	16	0.04	
Majority		1,970	5.01	
Turnout		39,346	91.75	
AINRC gain from DMK		Swing		

=== Assembly Election 2021 ===
2021 Puducherry Legislative Assembly election: Villianur
Party	Candidate	Votes	%	±%
DMK	R. Siva	19,653	55.73%	
AINRC	S. V. Sugumaran	12,703	36.02%	
MNM	A. Banumathi	609	1.73%	
NOTA	Nota	478	1.36%	−0.06%
Amma Makkal Munnettra Kazagam	Kumaravel	162	0.46%	
Margin of victory		6,950	19.71%	−6.54%
Turnout		35,266	83.08%	−2.70%
Registered electors		42,448		15.44%
DMK gain from INC		Swing	-1.36%	

=== Assembly Election 2016 ===
2016 Puducherry Legislative Assembly election: Villianur
Party	Candidate	Votes	%	±%
INC	A. Namassivayam	18,009	57.09%	5.06%
AINRC	Jayakumar	9,728	30.84%	
VCK	A. Mohamad Halid	1,598	5.07%	
AIADMK	V. Subramanian	704	2.23%	
NOTA	None of the Above	445	1.41%	
BJP	S. Mohankumar	361	1.14%	0.41%
SDPI	A. Rabick Mansure	195	0.62%	
Margin of victory		8,281	26.25%	20.13%
Turnout		31,545	85.79%	−2.66%
Registered electors		36,772		29.12%
INC hold		Swing	5.06%	

=== Assembly Election 2011 ===
2011 Puducherry Legislative Assembly election: Villianur
Party	Candidate	Votes	%	±%
INC	A. Namassivayam	13,105	52.03%	8.91%
AINRC	K. Nadarajan	11,564	45.91%	
BJP	M. S. Perumal	186	0.74%	−0.44%
Independent	Sivakumar	155	0.62%	
Independent	K. Athiriyen	136	0.54%	
Margin of victory		1,541	6.12%	−0.11%
Turnout		25,188	88.45%	−0.65%
Registered electors		28,478		4.78%
INC gain from Independent		Swing	2.68%	

=== Assembly Election 2006 ===
2006 Pondicherry Legislative Assembly election: Villianur
Party	Candidate	Votes	%	±%
Independent	J. Narayanasamy	11,950	49.35%	
INC	C. Djeacoumar	10,441	43.12%	
PMC	C. Ramadassou	1,101	4.55%	
BJP	P. Cannane	286	1.18%	
Independent	A. Selvalatchoumy	196	0.81%	
DMDK	Dr. C. Rajasekaran	127	0.52%	
Margin of victory		1,509	6.23%	−13.75%
Turnout		24,216	89.10%	8.38%
Registered electors		27,179		7.21%
Independent gain from TMC(M)		Swing	-1.16%	

=== Assembly Election 2001 ===
2001 Pondicherry Legislative Assembly election: Villianur
Party	Candidate	Votes	%	±%
TMC(M)	C. Djeacoumar	10,335	50.51%	
PMC	J. Narayanasamy	6,246	30.52%	
Independent	Ananda Baskaran	2,926	14.30%	
AIADMK	Ramane	546	2.67%	
Independent	R. Arunachalam	215	1.05%	
Independent	B. Sandanam	107	0.52%	
Margin of victory		4,089	19.98%	−10.14%
Turnout		20,462	80.72%	5.73%
Registered electors		25,350		9.43%
TMC(M) hold		Swing	-3.58%	

=== Assembly Election 1996 ===
1996 Pondicherry Legislative Assembly election: Villianur
Party	Candidate	Votes	%	±%
TMC(M)	C. Jayakumar	12,205	64.56%	
INC	P. Anandabaskaran	6,509	34.43%	−19.66%
Margin of victory		5,696	30.13%	20.55%
Turnout		18,906	83.35%	8.36%
Registered electors		23,166		11.58%
TMC(M) gain from INC		Swing	10.46%	

=== Assembly Election 1991 ===
1991 Pondicherry Legislative Assembly election: Villianur
Party	Candidate	Votes	%	±%
INC	P. Anandabaskaran	8,190	54.09%	−0.21%
JD	C. Jayakumar	6,740	44.51%	
Margin of victory		1,450	9.58%	−14.46%
Turnout		15,141	74.99%	−1.75%
Registered electors		20,762		1.59%
INC hold		Swing	-0.21%	

=== Assembly Election 1990 ===
1990 Pondicherry Legislative Assembly election: Villianur
Party	Candidate	Votes	%	±%
INC	P. Anandabaskaran	8,442	54.30%	1.96%
DMK	M. Venugopal	4,706	30.27%	−17.39%
PMK	R. Thulasidasan	2,252	14.49%	
Margin of victory		3,736	24.03%	19.35%
Turnout		15,546	76.74%	−3.40%
Registered electors		20,438		48.59%
INC hold		Swing	1.96%	

=== Assembly Election 1985 ===
1985 Pondicherry Legislative Assembly election: Villianur
Party	Candidate	Votes	%	±%
INC	R. Subbaraya Gounder	5,696	52.34%	
DMK	M. Venugopal	5,187	47.66%	3.43%
Margin of victory		509	4.68%	−3.97%
Turnout		10,883	80.15%	−2.05%
Registered electors		13,755		23.91%
INC gain from DMK		Swing	8.11%	

=== Assembly Election 1980 ===
1980 Pondicherry Legislative Assembly election: Villianur
Party	Candidate	Votes	%	±%
DMK	M. Venugopal	3,810	44.23%	23.63%
AIADMK	S. Sellappan Alias Meenakshisundaram	3,065	35.58%	0.58%
Independent	N. Sinnathambi	1,739	20.19%	
Margin of victory		745	8.65%	6.68%
Turnout		8,614	82.20%	2.38%
Registered electors		11,101		5.97%
DMK gain from AIADMK		Swing	9.23%	

=== Assembly Election 1977 ===
1977 Pondicherry Legislative Assembly election: Villianur
Party	Candidate	Votes	%	±%
AIADMK	S. Pazhaninathan	2,891	35.00%	0.72%
JP	P. Varadarassu	2,728	33.03%	
DMK	M. A. Shanmugam	1,701	20.60%	−8.12%
INC	N. Devadass	939	11.37%	
Margin of victory		163	1.97%	−0.74%
Turnout		8,259	79.82%	−7.83%
Registered electors		10,476		16.75%
AIADMK gain from INC(O)		Swing	-1.99%	

=== Assembly Election 1974 ===
1974 Pondicherry Legislative Assembly election: Villianur
Party	Candidate	Votes	%	±%
INC(O)	M. K. Jeevarathina Odayar	2,812	37.00%	
AIADMK	K. Thirukamu	2,606	34.28%	
DMK	S. Arumugam	2,183	28.72%	−31.23%
Margin of victory		206	2.71%	−17.20%
Turnout		7,601	87.65%	2.92%
Registered electors		8,973		8.03%
INC(O) gain from DMK		Swing	-22.96%	

=== Assembly Election 1969 ===
1969 Pondicherry Legislative Assembly election: Villianur
Party	Candidate	Votes	%	±%
DMK	S. Arumugam	4,132	59.95%	
INC	S. V. Murugesa Nadar	2,760	40.05%	−17.65%
Margin of victory		1,372	19.91%	−1.70%
Turnout		6,892	84.73%	3.44%
Registered electors		8,306		−5.04%
DMK gain from INC		Swing	2.26%	

=== Assembly Election 1964 ===
1964 Pondicherry Legislative Assembly election: Villianur
Party	Candidate	Votes	%	±%
INC	Thillai Kanakarasu	4,025	57.70%	
IPF	M. Abdul Rahiman	2,518	36.10%	
Independent	Pakir Mohamed Sahib	433	6.21%	
Margin of victory		1,507	21.60%	
Turnout		6,976	81.30%	
Registered electors		8,747		
INC win (new seat)				

== See also ==
- List of constituencies of the Puducherry Legislative Assembly
- Puducherry district
