= P. Karthikeyan (Puducherry politician) =

Indian politician

Member of the Puducherry Legislative Assembly
- Incumbent
- Assumed office 2026
- Preceded by: S. P. Sivakumar
- Constituency: Ossudu
- In office 2011 - 2016
- Preceded by: A Elumalai
- Succeeded by: E. Theeppainthan
- Constituency: Ossudu

Personal details
- Born: 2 August 1975 (age 51) Karasur, Puducherry, India
- Party: Indian National Congress
- Profession: Politician

P. Karthikeyan is an Indian politician and member of the Indian National Congress. He was elected as a Member of the Puducherry Legislative Assembly from the Ossudu constituency in the 2026 Puducherry Legislative Assembly election.
