= Ossudu Assembly constituency =

Constituency of the Puducherry legislative assembly in India

Coordinates: 11.959°N 79.725°E

Oussudu
- Constituency No. 3 for the Puducherry Legislative Assembly
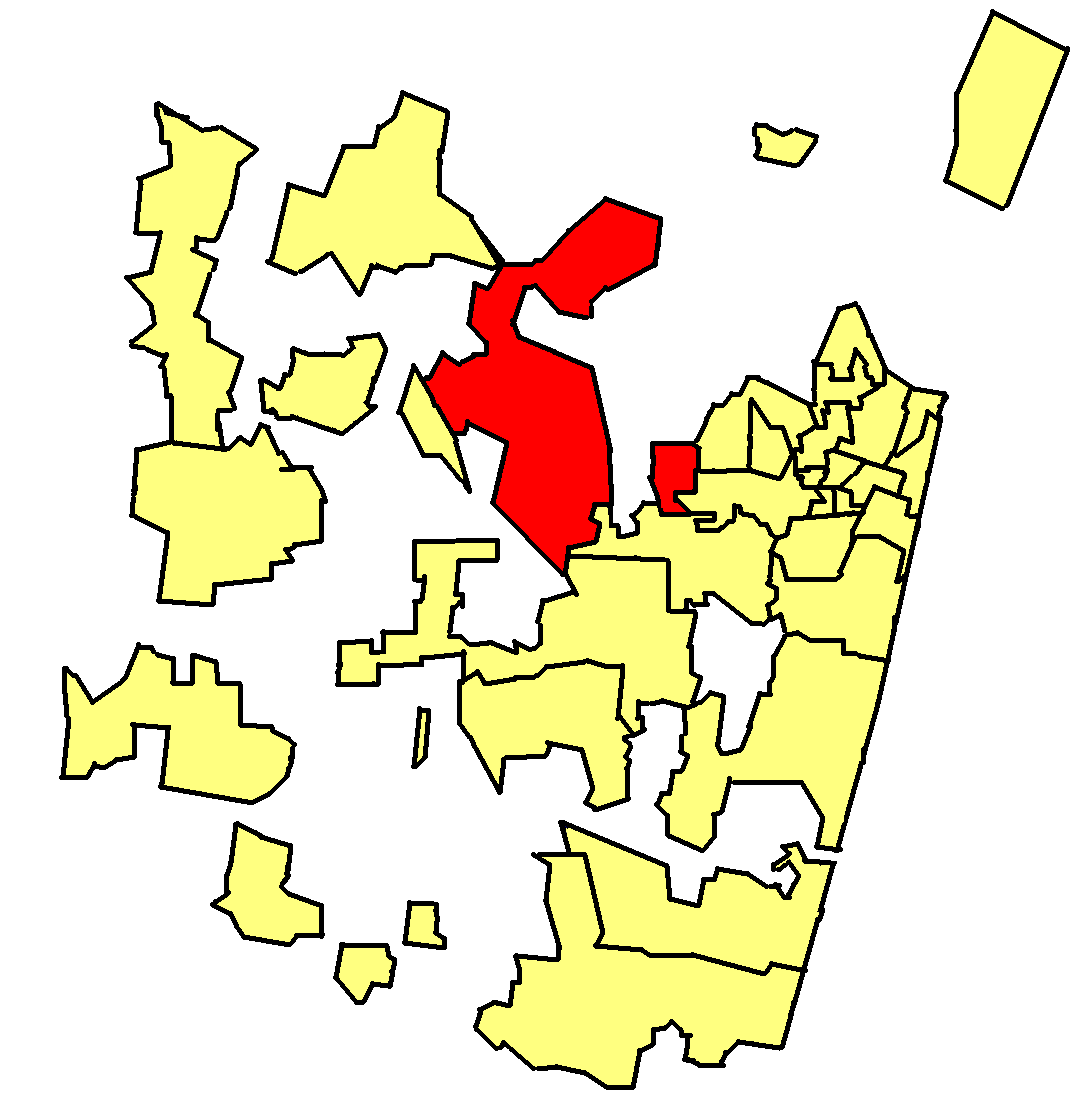

Constituency details
- Country: India
- Region: South India
- Union Territory: Puducherry
- District: Puducherry
- Lok Sabha constituency: Puducherry
- Established: 1964
- Reservation: SC

Member of Legislative Assembly
- 16th Puducherry Legislative Assembly
- Incumbent P. Karthikeyan
- Party: INC

Ossudu is a legislative assembly constituency in the Union territory of Puducherry in India. Ossudu Assembly constituency is part of Puducherry Lok Sabha constituency. This assembly constituency is reserved for SC candidates.

== Members of the Legislative Assembly ==
Year	Member	Political Party
1964	N. Harikrishnan	Indian National Congress
1969	V. Nagarathinam	Indian National Congress
1974	T. Ezhumalai	All India Anna Dravida Munnetra Kazhagam
1977	M. Thangavelu	All India Anna Dravida Munnetra Kazhagam
1980	P. Murthy	Dravida Munnetra Kazhagam
1985	V. Nagarathinam	Indian National Congress
1990	N. Marimuthu	Indian National Congress
1991	N. Marimuthu	Indian National Congress
1996	V. Nagarathinam	Tamil Maanila Congress
2001	A. Elumalai	Pondicherry Makkal Congress
2006	A. Elumalai	Independent politician
2011	P. Karthikeyan	All India N.R. Congress
2016	E. Theeppainthan	Indian National Congress
2021	Sai J. Saravanan Kumar	Bharatiya Janata Party
2026	P. Karthikeyan	Indian National Congress

== Election results ==
Vote share of winning candidates
2021	48.78%
2016	33.00%
2011	58.78%
2006	34.58%
2001	34.65%
1996	53.78%
1991	63.00%
1990	40.77%
1985	69.24%
1980	66.48%
1977	41.96%
1974	47.83%
1969	50.60%
1964	55.07%

=== Assembly Election 2026 ===
2026 Puducherry Legislative Assembly election: Ossudu
Party	Candidate	Votes	%	±%
INC	P. Karthikeyan	15,400	49.2	▲
BJP	E. Theeppainthan	11,382	36.36	▼
TVK	S. Saraganabava	3,698	11.81	New
NOTA	NOTA	273	0.87	
Margin of victory		4,018	12.84	
Turnout		31,301		
Rejected ballots				
Registered electors		32,807		
INC gain from BJP		Swing		

=== Assembly Election 2021 ===
2021 Puducherry Legislative Assembly election: Ossudu
Party	Candidate	Votes	%	±%
BJP	A. K. Sai J. Saravanan Kumar	14,121	48.78	24.64
INC	P. Karthikeyan	12,241	42.29	9.28
Amma Makkal Munnettra Kazagam	Muthalu Vengadesan	496	1.71	
NOTA	Nota	409	1.41	−0.06
Independent	N. Ambigapathy	320	1.11	
MNM	K. Sankar	293	1.01	
Independent	A. Murali	165	0.57	
Margin of victory		1,880	6.49	−2.37
Turnout		28,947	89.50	−1.22
Registered electors		32,342		11.63
BJP gain from INC		Swing	15.78	

=== Assembly Election 2016 ===
2016 Puducherry Legislative Assembly election: Ossudu
Party	Candidate	Votes	%	±%
INC	E. Theeppainthan	8,675	33.00	
BJP	A. K. Sai J. Saravanan Kumar	6,345	24.14	
AINRC	M. Vaithiyanathan	5,687	21.64	
Independent	P. Karthikeyan	3,397	12.92	
AIADMK	M. Selvarassou	942	3.58	
VCK	D. Angalan	479	1.82	
NOTA	None of the Above	388	1.48	
Independent	P. Asaravel	166	0.63	
Margin of victory		2,330	8.86	−13.89
Turnout		26,284	90.72	−0.81
Registered electors		28,973		16.97
INC gain from AINRC		Swing	-25.78	

=== Assembly Election 2011 ===
2011 Puducherry Legislative Assembly election: Ossudu
Party	Candidate	Votes	%	±%
AINRC	P. Karthikeyan	13,327	58.78	
DMK	Abar Elumalai	8,169	36.03	18.98
Independent	P. Sundararasu Ponnas	756	3.33	
LJP	M. Pitchekarane @ Pitchaiappan	224	0.99	
Margin of victory		5,158	22.75	8.41
Turnout		22,672	91.53	−0.65
Registered electors		24,770		23.03
AINRC gain from Independent		Swing	24.21	

=== Assembly Election 2006 ===
2006 Pondicherry Legislative Assembly election: Ossudu
Party	Candidate	Votes	%	±%
Independent	Abar Elumalai	6,417	34.58	
Independent	P. Soundiraradjou Ponnas	3,755	20.23	
DMK	T. Mathivanan	3,164	17.05	
Independent	N. Marimuthu	3,061	16.49	
Independent	S. Balaraman	900	4.85	
AIADMK	S. Arasi	642	3.46	
DMDK	A. Pugazhendhy	250	1.35	
LJP	Ilavarassane	202	1.09	
Independent	Arounassalame	88	0.47	
Margin of victory		2,662	14.34	13.28
Turnout		18,559	92.18	10.96
Registered electors		20,134		5.62
Independent gain from PMC		Swing	-0.07	

=== Assembly Election 2001 ===
2001 Pondicherry Legislative Assembly election: Ossudu
Party	Candidate	Votes	%	±%
PMC	Abar Elumalai	5,364	34.65	
PMK	S. Balaraman	5,200	33.59	32.76
TMC(M)	P. Sundhararaju	4,072	26.30	
Independent	N. Marimuthu	200	1.29	
MDMK	M. Dayalan	196	1.27	
Puratchi Bharatham	S. Kalai	95	0.61	
Independent	M. Sivanandham	94	0.61	
Independent	P. Ganapathy	79	0.51	
LJP	N. Arikishnan	78	0.50	
Margin of victory		164	1.06	−14.59
Turnout		15,481	81.22	7.94
Registered electors		19,063		5.68
PMC gain from TMC(M)		Swing	-28.35	

=== Assembly Election 1996 ===
1996 Pondicherry Legislative Assembly election: Ossudu
Party	Candidate	Votes	%	±%
TMC(M)	V. Nagarathinam	7,380	53.78	
INC	N. Marimuthu	5,232	38.13	−24.87
Independent	I. Elumalai	226	1.65	
Independent	P. Murugan	192	1.40	
Independent	T. Arulselvi	185	1.35	
Independent	S. Iyyanar	117	0.85	
BSP	P. Sundar Rajan	115	0.84	
PMK	M. P. Datchinamurthy	114	0.83	
Independent	G. Narayanasamy	81	0.59	
Margin of victory		2,148	15.65	−11.39
Turnout		13,722	80.14	6.86
Registered electors		18,038		9.45
TMC(M) gain from INC		Swing	-9.22	

=== Assembly Election 1991 ===
1991 Pondicherry Legislative Assembly election: Ossudu
Party	Candidate	Votes	%	±%
INC	N. Marimuthu	7,293	63.00	22.23
JD	S. Balaraman	4,162	35.95	
JP	S. Vijayakumar	77	0.67	
Margin of victory		3,131	27.05	13.61
Turnout		11,576	73.28	−5.65
Registered electors		16,480		0.30
INC hold		Swing	22.23	

=== Assembly Election 1990 ===
1990 Pondicherry Legislative Assembly election: Ossudu
Party	Candidate	Votes	%	±%
INC	N. Marimuthu	5,242	40.77	−28.47
JD	P. Sundararasu	3,514	27.33	
Independent	P. Murthy	2,058	16.01	
PMK	C. Rajendiran	1,957	15.22	
Margin of victory		1,728	13.44	−30.56
Turnout		12,857	78.93	1.63
Registered electors		16,430		40.96
INC hold		Swing	-28.47	

=== Assembly Election 1985 ===
1985 Pondicherry Legislative Assembly election: Ossudu
Party	Candidate	Votes	%	±%
INC	V. Nagarathinam	6,176	69.24	
CPI	R. Thangavelu Clemanso	2,251	25.24	
JP	N. Arikrishnane	493	5.53	
Margin of victory		3,925	44.00	8.33
Turnout		8,920	77.31	−3.40
Registered electors		11,656		15.17
INC gain from DMK		Swing	2.75	

=== Assembly Election 1980 ===
1980 Pondicherry Legislative Assembly election: Ossudu
Party	Candidate	Votes	%	±%
DMK	P. Murthy	5,122	66.48	54.79
AIADMK	K. Dhakshinamurthy	2,374	30.82	−11.15
Independent	D. Arumugam	208	2.70	
Margin of victory		2,748	35.67	17.42
Turnout		7,704	80.70	7.31
Registered electors		10,121		5.65
DMK gain from AIADMK		Swing	24.52	

=== Assembly Election 1977 ===
1977 Pondicherry Legislative Assembly election: Ossudu
Party	Candidate	Votes	%	±%
AIADMK	M. Thangavelu	2,902	41.96	−5.87
INC	V. Nagarathinam	1,640	23.71	−10.64
JP	R. Sivaparakasam	1,451	20.98	
DMK	M. Veerammal Vanamayil	809	11.70	−6.12
Independent	P. Rajalashumi	62	0.90	
Independent	N. Arikrishnan	52	0.75	
Margin of victory		1,262	18.25	4.78
Turnout		6,916	73.39	−13.19
Registered electors		9,580		10.27
AIADMK hold		Swing	-5.87	

=== Assembly Election 1974 ===
1974 Pondicherry Legislative Assembly election: Ossudu
Party	Candidate	Votes	%	±%
AIADMK	T. Ezhumalai	3,426	47.83	
INC	V. Nagarathinam	2,461	34.36	−16.24
DMK	G. Thanagarassu	1,276	17.81	
Margin of victory		965	13.47	12.28
Turnout		7,163	86.58	10.30
Registered electors		8,688		−2.93
AIADMK gain from INC		Swing	-2.77	

=== Assembly Election 1969 ===
1969 Pondicherry Legislative Assembly election: Ossudu
Party	Candidate	Votes	%	±%
INC	V. Nagarathinam	3,386	50.60	−4.47
CPI	P. S. Perumal	3,306	49.40	
Margin of victory		80	1.20	−8.94
Turnout		6,692	76.28	8.08
Registered electors		8,950		7.42
INC hold		Swing	-4.47	

=== Assembly Election 1964 ===
1964 Pondicherry Legislative Assembly election: Ossudu
Party	Candidate	Votes	%	±%
INC	N. Harikrishnan	3,027	55.07	
IPF	S. Perumal	2,470	44.93	
Margin of victory		557	10.13	
Turnout		5,497	68.19	
Registered electors		8,332		
INC win (new seat)				
