= Ashok Anand =

Indian politician

Puducherry Legislative Assembly
- Incumbent
- Assumed office 14 October 2026
- Preceded by: N. Rangaswamy
- Constituency: Thattanchavady
- In office 2011–2019
- Preceded by: N. Rangasamy
- Succeeded by: K. Venkatesan

Personal details
- Born: Ashok Anand
- Party: All India NR Congress (2011– )
- Other political affiliations: Indian National Congress

Ashok Anand is an Indian politician. He was elected to the Puducherry Legislative Assembly from Thattanchavady, Puducherry in the 2011 Puducherry Legislative Assembly election as a member of the All India NR Congress.
