= M. Ramadass =

Indian politician

MP (2004–2009)
- Preceded by: M. O. H. Farook
- Succeeded by: V Narayanasamy
- Constituency: Pondicherry

Personal details
- Born: 11 October 1949 (age 76) Tanjore, Tamil Nadu
- Party: PMK
- Spouse: R. Dhan Lakshami
- As of 16 September, 2006

M. Ramadass (born 11 October 1949) is an Indian politician who was a member of the 14th Lok Sabha of India. He represented the Pondicherry constituency and is a member of the Pattali Makkal Katchi (PMK) political party led by S. Ramadoss. He lost to Narayanaswamy in the 15th Lok Sabha election, in the renamed Puducherry constituency
