= R. Siva =

Indian politician

13th Leader of the Opposition in Puducherry Legislative Assembly
- In office 8 May 2021 – 4 May 2026
- Lieutenant Governor: Tamilisai Soundararajan; C. P. Radhakrishnan; Kuniyil Kailashnathan
- Preceded by: N. Rangaswamy
- Succeeded by: A. M. H. Nazeem
- Constituency: Villianur

Member of the Puducherry Legislative Assembly
- In office 8 May 2021 – 4 May 2026
- Preceded by: A. Namassivayam
- Constituency: Villianur
- In office 8 May 2016 – 7 May 2021
- Preceded by: G. Nehru Kuppusamy
- Succeeded by: G. Nehru Kuppusamy
- Constituency: Orleampeth
- In office 8 May 1996 – 7 May 2011
- Preceded by: K. Parasuraman
- Succeeded by: G. Nehru Kuppusamy
- Constituency: Orleampeth

Secretary of the Dravida Munnetra Kazhagam, Puducherry
- Incumbent
- Assumed office 8 May 2021
- Preceded by: Position Established

Personal details
- Born: 29 April 1967 (age 59) Puducherry, India
- Party: Dravida Munnetra Kazhagam
- Profession: Politician

Ragavapillai Siva (born 29 April 1967) is an Indian politician and a prominent member of the Dravida Munnetra Kazhagam (DMK). He served as the 13th Leader of the Opposition in the Puducherry Legislative Assembly and represented the Villianur constituency.

== Political career ==
Siva began his political journey as a member of the Dravida Munnetra Kazhagam (DMK). He was first elected to the Puducherry Legislative Assembly in 1996, representing the Orleampeth constituency. He continued serving as a member of the assembly from 1996 to 2011 and again from 2016 to 2021. Throughout his political career, Siva has been known for his dedication to the people of Puducherry.

In the 2021 elections, Siva was elected from the Villianur constituency, marking his return to the Legislative Assembly after a brief hiatus. Following his election, he was appointed the Leader of the Opposition in the Puducherry Legislative Assembly on 8 May 2021. His leadership was recognized by DMK President M. K. Stalin, who also appointed him as the first secretary of the DMK, Puducherry unit.

== Leadership in DMK ==
Siva's political alignment has always been with the DMK, and under his leadership, the Puducherry unit has strengthened its presence. His appointment as the Leader of the Opposition reflects his political influence and his ability to lead the party through challenging times in the assembly.

== Political Roles and Positions ==
Political Roles and Positions of R. Siva
Role	Constituency / Position	Term	Notes
Leader of the Opposition	Puducherry Legislative Assembly	8 May 2021 - 4 May 2026	Appointed after the 2021 elections by DMK President M. K. Stalin.
Member of the Legislative Assembly	Villianur	8 May 2021 – 4 May 2026	Won the 2021 Puducherry Assembly election.
Member of the Legislative Assembly	Orleampeth	1996 – 2011, 2016 – 2021	Served three consecutive terms (1996–2011) and one more (2016–2021).
Secretary – Puducherry Unit	Dravida Munnetra Kazhagam (DMK)	8 May 2021 – present	Appointed as DMK Puducherry unit secretary.

== Electoral history ==
Electoral History of R. Siva
Year	Constituency	Winner	Party	Result (Symbol)	Runner-up	Runner-up Party
1996	Orleampeth	R. Siva	DMK		K. Parasuraman	AIADMK
2001	Orleampeth	R. Siva	DMK		G. Chezhian	AIADMK
2006	Orleampeth	R. Siva	DMK		G. Nehru Kuppusamy	Independent
2011	Orleampeth	G. Nehru Kuppusamy	AINRC		R. Siva	DMK
2016	Orleampeth	R. Siva	DMK		G. Nehru Kuppusamy	AINRC
2021	Villianur	R. Siva	DMK		S. V. Sugumaran	AINRC

== See also ==
- List of leaders of the opposition in the Puducherry Legislative Assembly
- Dravida Munnetra Kazhagam
- Puducherry Legislative Assembly
