= S. Selvaganapathy =

Indian politician

S. Selvaganabathy

Member of Parliament, Rajya Sabha
- Incumbent
- Assumed office 4 October 2021
- Preceded by: N. Gokulakrishnan
- Constituency: Puducherry

Nominated Member of the Puducherry Legislative Assembly
- In office 4 July 2017 – 20 February 2021
- Preceded by: N/A
- Succeeded by: V. P. Ramalingam
- Constituency: Nominated Member

State President of the Bharatiya Janata Party, Puducherry
- In office 25 September 2023 – 29 June 2025
- Preceded by: V. Saminathan
- Succeeded by: V. P. Ramalingam

Personal details
- Party: Bharatiya Janata Party
- Profession: Educationist

S. Selvaganabathy is an Indian politician and current member of the Rajya Sabha from Bharatiya Janata Party. He represents Puducherry. Selvaganapathy was a member of the Puducherry Legislative Assembly from 3 June 2017 to 2 May 2021, as he was nominated by the Central Government of India. He is an educationist, runs Schools and BEd College.
