= V. P. Ramalingame =

Indian politician

Nominated Member of Puducherry Legislative Assembly
- Incumbent
- Assumed office May 11, 2021
- Preceded by: S. Selvaganapathy
- Constituency: Nominated Member

State President of the Bharatiya Janata Party, Puducherry
- Incumbent
- Assumed office 30 June 2025
- President: J. P. Nadda; Nitin Nabin
- Preceded by: S. Selvaganapathy

Personal details
- Party: Bharatiya Janata Party
- Other political affiliations: Indian National Congress
- Relatives: V. P. Sivakolundhu (brother)

V. P. Ramalingame is an Indian politician and member of the Bharatiya Janata Party. Ramalingam is a member of the Puducherry Legislative Assembly from May 11, 2021, as Nominated by the Central Government of India. He is the brother of the former Congress speaker of Puducherry Legislative Assembly V. P. Sivakolundhu. He is the current state president of the Bharatiya Janata Party, Puducherry.
