= Orleampeth Assembly constituency =

Constituency of the Puducherry legislative assembly in India

Coordinates: 11.937°N 79.824°E

Orleampeth
- Constituency No. 16 for the Puducherry Legislative Assembly
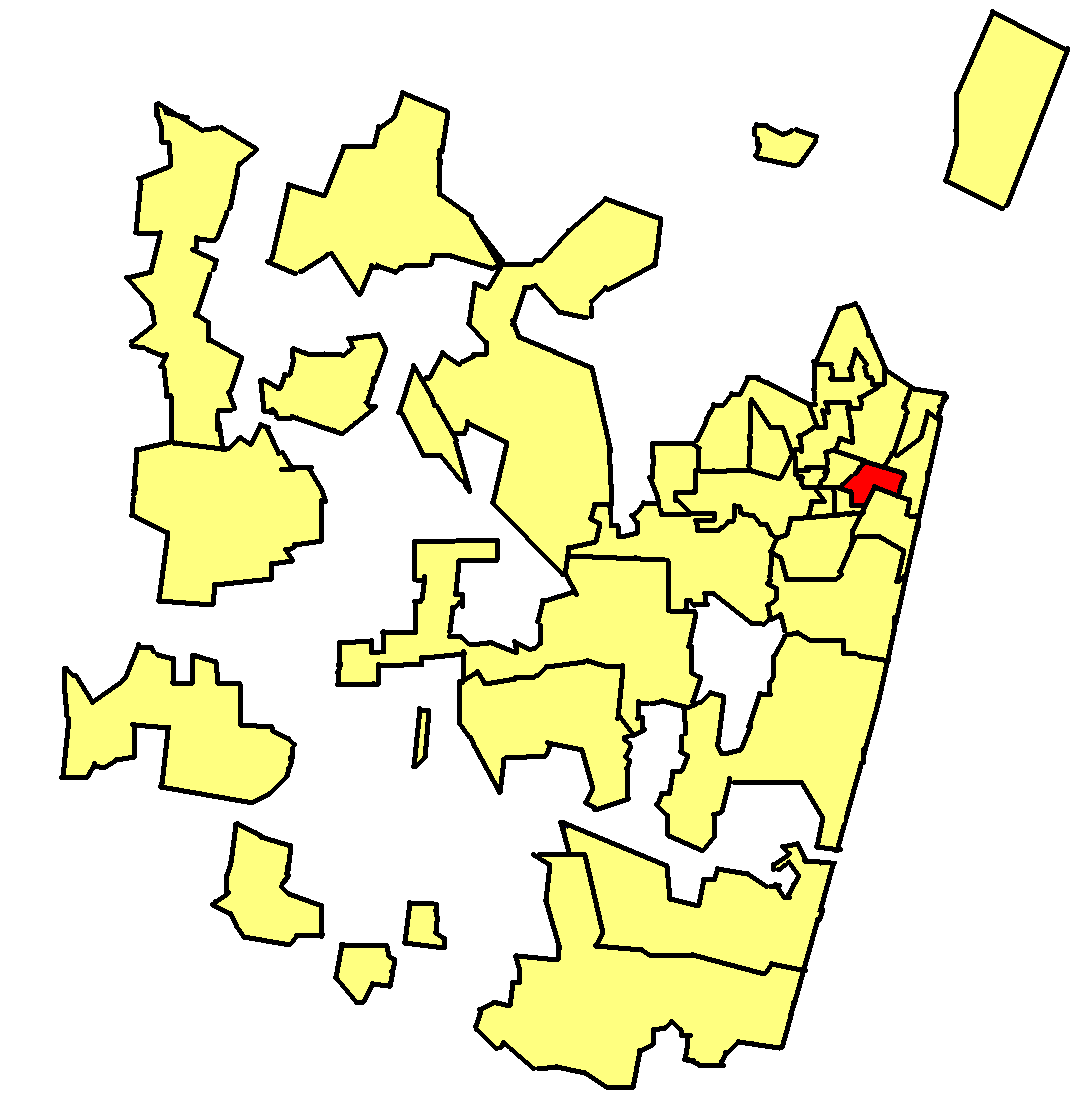

Constituency details
- Country: India
- Region: South India
- Union Territory: Puducherry
- District: Puducherry
- Lok Sabha constituency: Puducherry
- Established: 1974
- Total electors: 24,723
- Reservation: None

Member of Legislative Assembly
- 16th Puducherry Legislative Assembly
- Incumbent G. Nehru Kuppusamy
- Party: Neyam Makkal Kazhagam
- Elected year: 2021

Orleampeth is a legislative assembly constituency in the Union territory of Puducherry in India. Orleampeth Assembly constituency is a part of Puducherry Lok Sabha constituency.

== Members of Legislative Assembly ==
Election	Member	Party
1977	N. Manimaram Marimuthu	All India Anna Dravida Munnetra Kazhagam
1980	Na. Manimaran	Dravida Munnetra Kazhagam
1985	M.A.S. Subramanian	All India Anna Dravida Munnetra Kazhagam
1990	N. Manimaran	Dravida Munnetra Kazhagam
1991	K. Parasuraman	All India Anna Dravida Munnetra Kazhagam
1996	R. Siva	Dravida Munnetra Kazhagam
2001	R. Siva	Dravida Munnetra Kazhagam
2006	R. Siva	Dravida Munnetra Kazhagam
2011	G. Nehru Kuppusamy	All India N.R. Congress
2016	R. Siva	Dravida Munnetra Kazhagam
2021	G. Nehru Kuppusamy	Independent
2026	G. Nehru Kuppusamy	Neyam Makkal Kazhagam

== Election results ==
Vote share of winning candidates
2021	47.29%
2016	53.81%
2011	55.26%
2006	52.61%
2001	49.41%
1996	49.16%
1991	59.44%
1990	50.47%
1985	55.70%
1980	59.70%
1977	44.54%
1974	48.45%

=== Assembly Election 2026 ===
2026 Puducherry Legislative Assembly election: Orleampeth
Party	Candidate	Votes	%	±%
NMK	G. Nehru Kuppusamy	9,960	50.83	
DMK	S. Gopal	8,759	44.70	
AIADMK	A. Gandhi	300	1.53	
NOTA	None of the Above	153	0.78	
Margin of victory		1,021	6.13	
Turnout		19,594		
Rejected ballots				
Registered electors		21,611		
Independent hold		Swing		

=== Assembly Election 2021 ===
2021 Puducherry Legislative Assembly election: Orleampeth
Party	Candidate	Votes	%	±%
Independent	G. Nehru Kuppusamy	9,580	47.29	
DMK	S. Gopal	7,487	36.96	−16.85
AIADMK	Omsakthisekar	1,787	8.82	6.76
MNM	S. Saktivel	364	1.80	
NOTA	Nota	181	0.89	−1.02
Independent	V. Hariharane	113	0.56	
Margin of victory		2,093	10.33	−4.10
Turnout		20,257	81.95	−3.07
Registered electors		24,718		1.79
Independent gain from DMK		Swing	-6.52	

=== Assembly Election 2016 ===
2016 Puducherry Legislative Assembly election: Orleampeth
Party	Candidate	Votes	%	±%
DMK	R. Siva	11,110	53.81	11.72
AINRC	G. Nehru Kuppusamy	8,130	39.38	
AIADMK	A. Ravindran	425	2.06	
NOTA	None of the Above	395	1.91	
BJP	R. Rajendran	164	0.79	
Margin of victory		2,980	14.43	1.26
Turnout		20,647	85.02	0.90
Registered electors		24,284		2.76
DMK gain from AINRC		Swing	-1.45	

=== Assembly Election 2011 ===
2011 Puducherry Legislative Assembly election: Orleampeth
Party	Candidate	Votes	%	±%
AINRC	G. Nehru Kuppusamy	10,986	55.26	
DMK	R. Siva	8,368	42.09	−10.52
Independent	S. Nehru	247	1.24	
Margin of victory		2,618	13.17	1.05
Turnout		19,880	84.13	−1.36
Registered electors		23,631		24.91
AINRC gain from DMK		Swing	2.65	

=== Assembly Election 2006 ===
2006 Pondicherry Legislative Assembly election: Orleampeth
Party	Candidate	Votes	%	±%
DMK	R. Siva	8,509	52.61	3.20
Independent	G. Nehru Kuppusamy	6,549	40.49	
AIADMK	S. Anandharaj	710	4.39	−23.03
DMDK	R. Vijayalakshmi	149	0.92	
BJP	K. Sundari	83	0.51	
Independent	S. Nehru	83	0.51	
Margin of victory		1,960	12.12	−9.86
Turnout		16,174	85.49	15.21
Registered electors		18,919		−13.70
DMK hold		Swing	3.20	

=== Assembly Election 2001 ===
2001 Pondicherry Legislative Assembly election: Orleampeth
Party	Candidate	Votes	%	±%
DMK	R. Siva	7,608	49.41	0.25
AIADMK	G. Chezhian	4,223	27.42	−3.55
INC	C. Pandourangame	3,313	21.51	
Independent	B. Dayalarajan	154	1.00	
MDMK	M. Abdul Majeed	101	0.66	
Margin of victory		3,385	21.98	3.80
Turnout		15,399	70.28	12.13
Registered electors		21,923		−12.23
DMK hold		Swing	-10.04	

=== Assembly Election 1996 ===
1996 Pondicherry Legislative Assembly election: Orleampeth
Party	Candidate	Votes	%	±%
DMK	R. Siva	8,105	49.16	10.79
AIADMK	K. Parasuraman	5,107	30.97	−28.47
MDMK	C. Pandourangame	2,925	17.74	
Independent	V. Mohanraj	135	0.82	
Margin of victory		2,998	18.18	−2.90
Turnout		16,488	68.14	9.99
Registered electors		24,977		−2.96
DMK gain from AIADMK		Swing	-10.29	

=== Assembly Election 1991 ===
1991 Pondicherry Legislative Assembly election: Orleampeth
Party	Candidate	Votes	%	±%
AIADMK	K. Parasuraman	8,697	59.44	12.14
DMK	N. Manimaran	5,613	38.36	−12.10
JP	T. Harikrishnan	215	1.47	
Margin of victory		3,084	21.08	17.91
Turnout		14,631	58.15	−4.99
Registered electors		25,738		0.91
AIADMK gain from DMK		Swing	8.98	

=== Assembly Election 1990 ===
1990 Pondicherry Legislative Assembly election: Orleampeth
Party	Candidate	Votes	%	±%
DMK	N. Manimaran	8,076	50.47	7.83
AIADMK	M. Pandurangan	7,569	47.30	−8.40
Independent	Serge Venance	169	1.06	
PMK	G. K. Bascaran @ Gothandapani Dascara	116	0.72	
Margin of victory		507	3.17	−9.89
Turnout		16,003	63.14	−30.75
Registered electors		25,505		98.93
DMK gain from AIADMK		Swing	-5.23	

=== Assembly Election 1985 ===
1985 Pondicherry Legislative Assembly election: Orleampeth
Party	Candidate	Votes	%	±%
AIADMK	M. A. S. Subramanian	6,635	55.70	26.27
DMK	Na. Marimuthu	5,079	42.64	−17.06
Independent	N. Thirukkamu	87	0.73	
Independent	Serge Venance	82	0.69	
Margin of victory		1,556	13.06	−17.21
Turnout		11,912	93.89	18.27
Registered electors		12,821		−4.03
AIADMK gain from DMK		Swing	-4.00	

=== Assembly Election 1980 ===
1980 Pondicherry Legislative Assembly election: Orleampeth
Party	Candidate	Votes	%	±%
DMK	Na. Marimuthu	5,721	59.70	45.48
AIADMK	P. K. Loganathan	2,820	29.43	−15.12
Independent	Bhavani Maduragavi	573	5.98	
Independent	S. Kandavel	154	1.61	
Independent	S. Sinnaveerappan	141	1.47	
INC(U)	V. Dhalapathipandian Alias Kalidas	117	1.22	
Margin of victory		2,901	30.27	6.95
Turnout		9,583	75.61	9.30
Registered electors		13,359		3.17
DMK gain from AIADMK		Swing	15.16	

=== Assembly Election 1977 ===
1977 Pondicherry Legislative Assembly election: Orleampeth
Party	Candidate	Votes	%	±%
AIADMK	N. Manimaran	3,779	44.54	−3.90
JP	S. Ramalingam	1,800	21.22	
DMK	D. Bavani	1,206	14.21	−6.20
CPI	N. Ranganathan	1,176	13.86	
Independent	K. Muthu	523	6.16	
Margin of victory		1,979	23.33	4.66
Turnout		8,484	66.31	−13.90
Registered electors		12,949		28.65
AIADMK hold		Swing	-3.90	

=== Assembly Election 1974 ===
1974 Pondicherry Legislative Assembly election: Orleampeth
Party	Candidate	Votes	%	±%
AIADMK	N. Manimaran	3,833	48.45	
INC	R. Vaidyanathan	2,356	29.78	
DMK	N. Ganesan	1,615	20.41	
Independent	V. G. Muniswamy	57	0.72	
Independent	Marius Bala	51	0.64	
Margin of victory		1,477	18.67	
Turnout		7,912	80.22	
Registered electors		10,065		
AIADMK win (new seat)				

== See also ==
- List of constituencies of the Puducherry Legislative Assembly
- Puducherry district
