= N Gokulakrishnan =

Indian politician

N. Gokulakrishnan

Member of Parliament, Rajya Sabha
- In office 6 October 2015 – 1 October 2021
- Preceded by: P. Kannan
- Succeeded by: Selvaganapathy
- Constituency: Puducherry

Personal details
- Born: N. Gokulakrishnan; February 25, 1954 (age 72) Velangudi, Thiruvarur District
- Party: All India Anna Dravida Munnetra Kazhagam
- Spouse: G. Mangayarkarasi
- Children: Daughter: Two
- Education: B.A. (Economics)
- Alma mater: Arignar Anna Government Arts College, Karaikal

N Gokulakrishnan is a politician. He was a Member of Parliament, representing Puducherry in the Rajya Sabha (the upper house of India's Parliament).He was elected on 6 October 2015 and served till 5 October 2021.

He belongs to the Indian All India Anna Dravida Munnetra Kazhagam (ADMK) political party.
