= Thattanchavady Assembly constituency =

Constituency of the Puducherry legislative assembly in India

Coordinates: 11.945°N 79.804°E

Thattanchavady
- Constituency No. 9 for the Puducherry Legislative Assembly
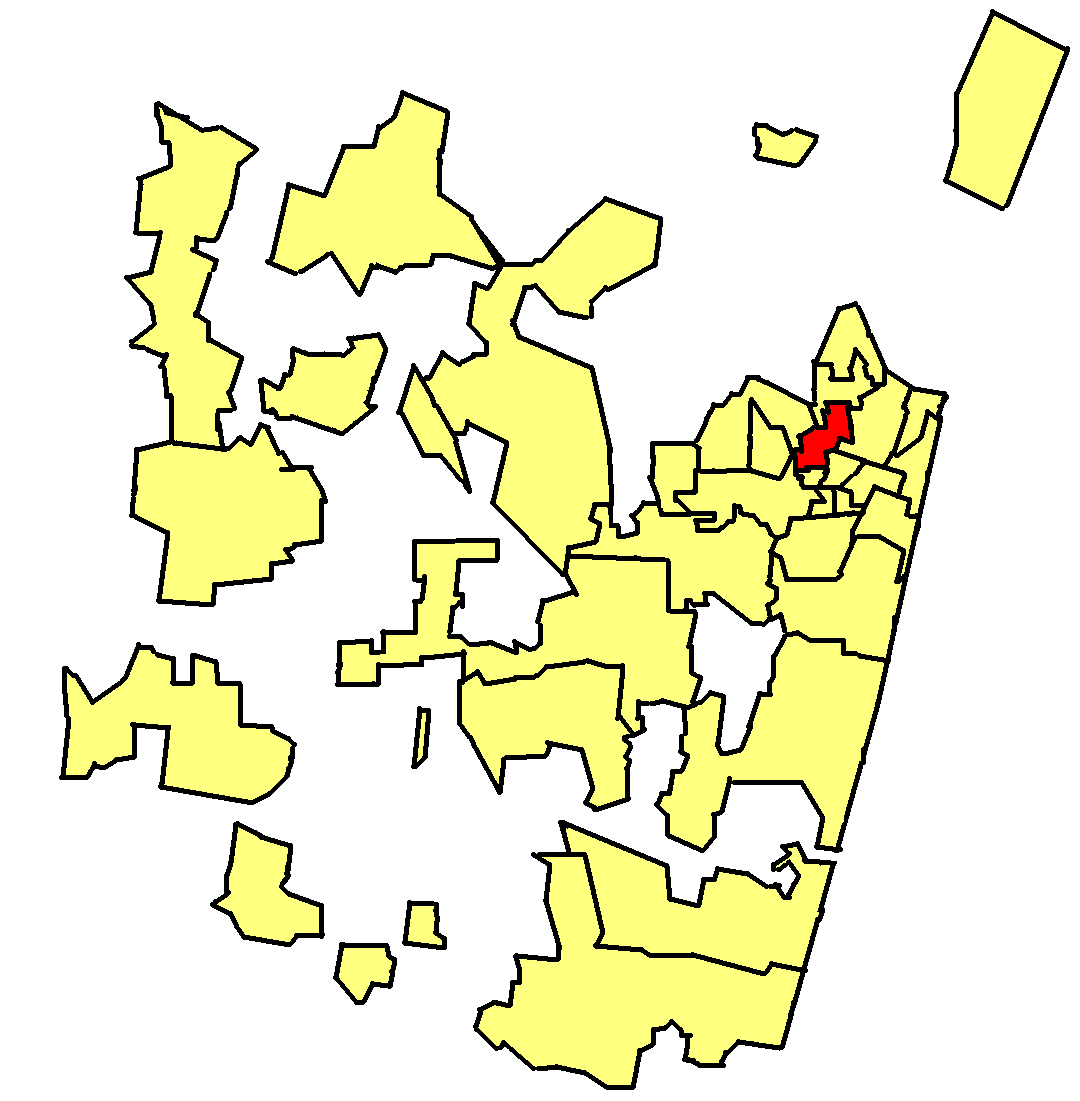

Constituency details
- Country: India
- Region: South India
- Union Territory: Puducherry
- District: Puducherry
- Lok Sabha constituency: Puducherry
- Established: 1974
- Total electors: 30,483
- Reservation: None

Member of Legislative Assembly
- 16th Puducherry Legislative Assembly
- Incumbent Ashok Anand
- Party: AINRC
- Alliance: NDA
- Elected year: 2026

Thattanchavady is a Assembly Constituency in the Union territory of Puducherry in India.

== Members of the Legislative Assembly ==
| Year | Name | Party |
|---|---|---|
| 1974 | V. Pethaperumal | Indian National Congress |
| 1977 | V. Pethaperumal | Janata Party |
| 1980 | V. Pethaperumal | Janata Party |
| 1985 | V. Pethaperumal | Janata Party |
| 1990 | V. Pethaperumal | Janata Dal |
| 1991 | N. Rangasamy | Indian National Congress |
| 1996 | N. Rangasamy | Indian National Congress |
| 2001 | N. Rangasamy | Indian National Congress |
| 2006 | N. Rangasamy | Indian National Congress |
| 2011 | Ashok Anand | All India N.R. Congress |
| 2016 | Ashok Anand | All India N.R. Congress |
| 2019^ | K. Venkatesan | Dravida Munnetra Kazhagam |
| 2021 | N. Rangaswamy | All India N.R. Congress |
| 2026 | N. Rangaswamy | All India N.R. Congress |
| 2026^ | Ashok Anand | All India N.R. Congress |

- ^ denotes by-election

== Election Results ==
Vote share of winning candidates
| 2026 by-election | 61.12% |
| 2026 | 42.51% |
| 2021 | 55.02% |
| 2019 by-election | 48.84% |
| 2016 | 53.81% |
| 2011 | 67.99% |
| 2006 | 90.16% |
| 2001 | 58.90% |
| 1996 | 42.95% |
| 1991 | 69.71% |
| 1990 | 51.31% |
| 1985 | 44.66% |
| 1980 | 48.85% |
| 1977 | 54.46% |
| 1974 | 46.85% |

=== 2026 by-election ===
2026 Puducherry Legislative Assembly Bye-election: Thattanchavady
| Party | Candidate | Votes | % | ±% |
|---|---|---|---|---|
| AINRC | Ashok Anand | 13,358 | 61.12 | ▲18.61 |
| INC | E. Vinayagam | 4,876 | 22.31 | ▲9.63 |
| DMK | K. Sethuselvam | 2,664 | 12.19 | New entry |
| CPI | A. M. Saleem | 310 | 1.42 | New entry |
| NOTA | None of the above | 225 | 1.03 | |
| Margin of victory | | 8,482 | 38.81 | |
| Turnout | | 21,857 | 80.81 | |
| Registered electors | | 30,483 | | |
| AINRC hold | | Swing | | |

=== Assembly Election 2026 ===
2026 Puducherry Legislative Assembly election: Thattanchavady
| Party | Candidate | Votes | % | ±% |
|---|---|---|---|---|
| AINRC | N. Rangaswamy | 10,024 | 42.51 | ▼ |
| NMK | E. Vinayagam | 5,483 | 23.68 | New |
| Independent | K. Sethuselvam | 3,984 | 16.90 | New |
| INC | V. Vaithilingam | 2,990 | 12.68 | |
| NOTA | None of the above | 196 | 0.83 | |
| Margin of victory | | 4,441 | 18.83 | |
| Turnout | | 23,578 | | |
| Rejected ballots | | | | |
| Registered electors | | 26,452 | | |
| AINRC hold | | Swing | | |

=== Assembly Election 2021 ===
2021 Puducherry Legislative Assembly election: Thattanchavady
| Party | Candidate | Votes | % | ±% |
|---|---|---|---|---|
| AINRC | N. Rangaswamy | 12,978 | 55.02% | |
| CPI | K. Sethuselvam | 7,522 | 31.89% | 9.55% |
| MNM | R. Rajendran | 1,029 | 4.36% | |
| NOTA | None of the above | 438 | 1.86% | −2.03% |
| Independent | C. Anusuya | 128 | 0.54% | |
| Margin of victory | | 5,456 | 23.13% | −8.33% |
| Turnout | | 23,586 | 76.89% | −0.70% |
| Registered electors | | 30,674 | | 0.40% |
| AINRC gain from DMK | | Swing | 1.22% | |

=== 2019 By-election ===
2019 Puducherry Legislative Assembly Bye-election: Thattanchavady
| Party | Candidate | Votes | % | ±% |
|---|---|---|---|---|
| DMK | K. Venkatesan | 10,906 | 48.84 | |
| AINRC | P. Nedounzejiane | 9,367 | 41.94 | |
| Other | Others Independents/parties | 2,059 | 9.22 | |
| Margin of victory | | 1,539 | 6.90 | |
| Turnout | | | | |
| Registered electors | | | | |
| DMK gain from AINRC | | Swing | | |

=== Assembly Election 2016 ===
2016 Puducherry Legislative Assembly election: Thattanchavady
| Party | Candidate | Votes | % | ±% |
|---|---|---|---|---|
| AINRC | Ashok Anand | 12,754 | 53.81% | |
| CPI | K. Sethuselvam | 5,296 | 22.34% | |
| AIADMK | S. Cassinadin | 1,649 | 6.96% | |
| DMK | N. Kaliaperumal | 1,467 | 6.19% | −1.94% |
| NOTA | None of the Above | 922 | 3.89% | |
| BJP | P. Sivanandame | 897 | 3.78% | 1.10% |
| PMK | M. Murugasamy | 227 | 0.96% | |
| Margin of victory | | 7,458 | 31.46% | −17.47% |
| Turnout | | 23,704 | 77.59% | −2.44% |
| Registered electors | | 30,551 | | 13.88% |
| AINRC hold | | Swing | -14.18% | |

=== Assembly Election 2011 ===
2011 Puducherry Legislative Assembly election: Thattanchavady
| Party | Candidate | Votes | % | ±% |
|---|---|---|---|---|
| AINRC | Ashok Anand | 14,597 | 67.99% | |
| Independent | N. Arjunan | 4,091 | 19.05% | |
| DMK | A. Ilango | 1,745 | 8.13% | |
| BJP | P. Sivanandame | 577 | 2.69% | 1.49% |
| Independent | E. Bastian | 192 | 0.89% | |
| Independent | Masthanji Mohamed Kalimulla | 179 | 0.83% | |
| Margin of victory | | 10,506 | 48.93% | −34.46% |
| Turnout | | 21,470 | 80.03% | −4.27% |
| Registered electors | | 26,827 | | −24.55% |
| AINRC gain from INC | | Swing | -22.17% | |

=== Assembly Election 2006 ===
2006 Pondicherry Legislative Assembly election: Thattanchavady
| Party | Candidate | Votes | % | ±% |
|---|---|---|---|---|
| INC | N. Rangaswamy | 27,024 | 90.16% | 31.26% |
| AIADMK | T. Gunasekaran | 2,026 | 6.76% | 4.14% |
| BJP | Baskaran | 359 | 1.20% | |
| RSP | K. Lenin | 241 | 0.80% | |
| Independent | M. R. Govindan | 173 | 0.58% | |
| Margin of victory | | 24,998 | 83.40% | 60.56% |
| Turnout | | 29,975 | 84.30% | 16.43% |
| Registered electors | | 35,557 | | −0.85% |
| INC hold | | Swing | 31.26% | |

=== Assembly Election 2001 ===
2001 Pondicherry Legislative Assembly election: Thattanchavady
| Party | Candidate | Votes | % | ±% |
|---|---|---|---|---|
| INC | N. Rangaswamy | 14,323 | 58.90% | 15.94% |
| JD(U) | V. Pethaperumal | 8,769 | 36.06% | |
| AIADMK | N. Ragupathy | 638 | 2.62% | |
| Independent | A. Perumal | 358 | 1.47% | |
| MDMK | S. Apparsamy | 231 | 0.95% | |
| Margin of victory | | 5,554 | 22.84% | 12.99% |
| Turnout | | 24,319 | 67.87% | 3.17% |
| Registered electors | | 35,863 | | 9.33% |
| INC hold | | Swing | -10.81% | |

=== Assembly Election 1996 ===
1996 Pondicherry Legislative Assembly election: Thattanchavady
| Party | Candidate | Votes | % | ±% |
|---|---|---|---|---|
| INC | N. Rangaswamy | 9,989 | 42.95% | −26.76% |
| JD | V. Pethaperumal | 7,699 | 33.11% | |
| DMK | V. Rathinavelu | 5,223 | 22.46% | |
| Independent | K. Rajasekaran | 112 | 0.48% | |
| Independent | R. Manogaran | 110 | 0.47% | |
| Margin of victory | | 2,290 | 9.85% | −30.49% |
| Turnout | | 23,255 | 72.14% | 7.43% |
| Registered electors | | 32,803 | | 15.54% |
| INC hold | | Swing | -26.76% | |

=== Assembly Election 1991 ===
1991 Pondicherry Legislative Assembly election: Thattanchavady
| Party | Candidate | Votes | % | ±% |
|---|---|---|---|---|
| INC | N. Rangaswamy | 12,545 | 69.71% | 23.71% |
| JD | V. Pethaperumal | 5,285 | 29.37% | |
| PMK | S. Radhakrishnan | 113 | 0.63% | −1.54% |
| Margin of victory | | 7,260 | 40.34% | 35.04% |
| Turnout | | 17,996 | 64.70% | −2.12% |
| Registered electors | | 28,392 | | 1.76% |
| INC gain from JD | | Swing | 18.40% | |

=== Assembly Election 1990 ===
1990 Pondicherry Legislative Assembly election: Thattanchavady
| Party | Candidate | Votes | % | ±% |
|---|---|---|---|---|
| JD | V. Pethaperumal | 9,503 | 51.31% | |
| INC | N. Rangaswamy | 8,521 | 46.00% | 17.85% |
| PMK | T. Govindasamy | 401 | 2.16% | |
| Margin of victory | | 982 | 5.30% | −11.21% |
| Turnout | | 18,522 | 66.83% | −8.13% |
| Registered electors | | 27,900 | | 48.97% |
| JD gain from JP | | Swing | 6.64% | |

=== Assembly Election 1985 ===
1985 Pondicherry Legislative Assembly election: Thattanchavady
| Party | Candidate | Votes | % | ±% |
|---|---|---|---|---|
| JP | V. Pethaperumal | 6,228 | 44.66% | |
| INC | T. Murugesan | 3,926 | 28.16% | |
| DMK | A. V. Shunmugam | 3,790 | 27.18% | |
| Margin of victory | | 2,302 | 16.51% | −6.48% |
| Turnout | | 13,944 | 74.96% | −3.90% |
| Registered electors | | 18,729 | | 43.03% |
| JP hold | | Swing | -4.19% | |

=== Assembly Election 1980 ===
1980 Pondicherry Legislative Assembly election: Thattanchavady
| Party | Candidate | Votes | % | ±% |
|---|---|---|---|---|
| JP | V. Pethaperumal | 4,824 | 48.85% | |
| CPI | N. Kandeban | 2,554 | 25.86% | 2.48% |
| INC(I) | A. R. Soosairaj | 2,497 | 25.29% | |
| Margin of victory | | 2,270 | 22.99% | −8.09% |
| Turnout | | 9,875 | 78.86% | 7.56% |
| Registered electors | | 13,094 | | 8.18% |
| JP hold | | Swing | -5.61% | |

=== Assembly Election 1977 ===
1977 Pondicherry Legislative Assembly election: Thattanchavady
| Party | Candidate | Votes | % | ±% |
|---|---|---|---|---|
| JP | V. Pethaperumal | 4,669 | 54.46% | |
| CPI | V. Narayanasamy | 2,005 | 23.39% | −13.22% |
| AIADMK | N. Jayaraman | 1,355 | 15.81% | |
| DMK | M. C. Thanagavelan | 402 | 4.69% | −11.85% |
| Independent | K. S. Kullayappa | 142 | 1.66% | |
| Margin of victory | | 2,664 | 31.07% | 20.83% |
| Turnout | | 8,573 | 71.30% | −12.43% |
| Registered electors | | 12,104 | | 32.73% |
| JP gain from INC(O) | | Swing | 7.61% | |

=== Assembly Election 1974 ===
1974 Pondicherry Legislative Assembly election: Thattanchavady
| Party | Candidate | Votes | % | ±% |
|---|---|---|---|---|
| INC(O) | V. Pethaperumal | 3,468 | 46.85% | |
| CPI | N. Gurusamy | 2,710 | 36.61% | |
| DMK | P. K. Veeraragavalu | 1,224 | 16.54% | |
| Margin of victory | | 758 | 10.24% | |
| Turnout | | 7,402 | 83.73% | |
| Registered electors | | 9,119 | | |
| INC(O) win (new seat) | | | | |

== See also ==
- List of constituencies of the Puducherry Legislative Assembly
- Puducherry district
