= G. Nehru Kuppusamy =

Indian politician

Member of Puducherry Legislative Assembly
- Incumbent
- Assumed office 2 May 2021
- Preceded by: R. Siva
- Constituency: Orleampeth

Personal details
- Party: Neyam Makkal Kazhagam (2025–present)
- Other political affiliations: All India N. R. Congress (2021–2023); Independent (2023–2025)
- Profession: Politician

G. Nehru Kuppusamy is an Indian politician who founded the political party Neyam Makkal Kazhagam. He was elected as a member of the Puducherry Legislative Assembly from Orleampeth constituency.

== Politics ==
=== All India N. R. Congress & Independent ===
Nehru's political career is marked by a strong local presence in Orleampeth. He won the seat in 2011 representing the AINRC. After losing the seat in 2016 to the DMK, he made a successful comeback in 2021 as an independent candidate, securing 47.29% of the vote.

Known for his grassroots activism, Nehru has frequently staged unconventional protests to highlight public grievances, such as wheeling patients on stretchers to the Lok Niwas (the Lieutenant Governor’s residence) to protest inadequate medical care.

=== Neyam Makkal Kazhagam ===
In March 2026, ahead of the Puducherry Legislative Assembly elections, NMK joined the TVK-led Alliance headed by Vijay's Tamilaga Vettri Kazhagam (TVK). As part of the seat-sharing agreement, NMK was allotted two constituencies: Orleampeth and Thattanchavady.
