= V. Narayanasamy =

10th Chief Minister of Puducherry, India

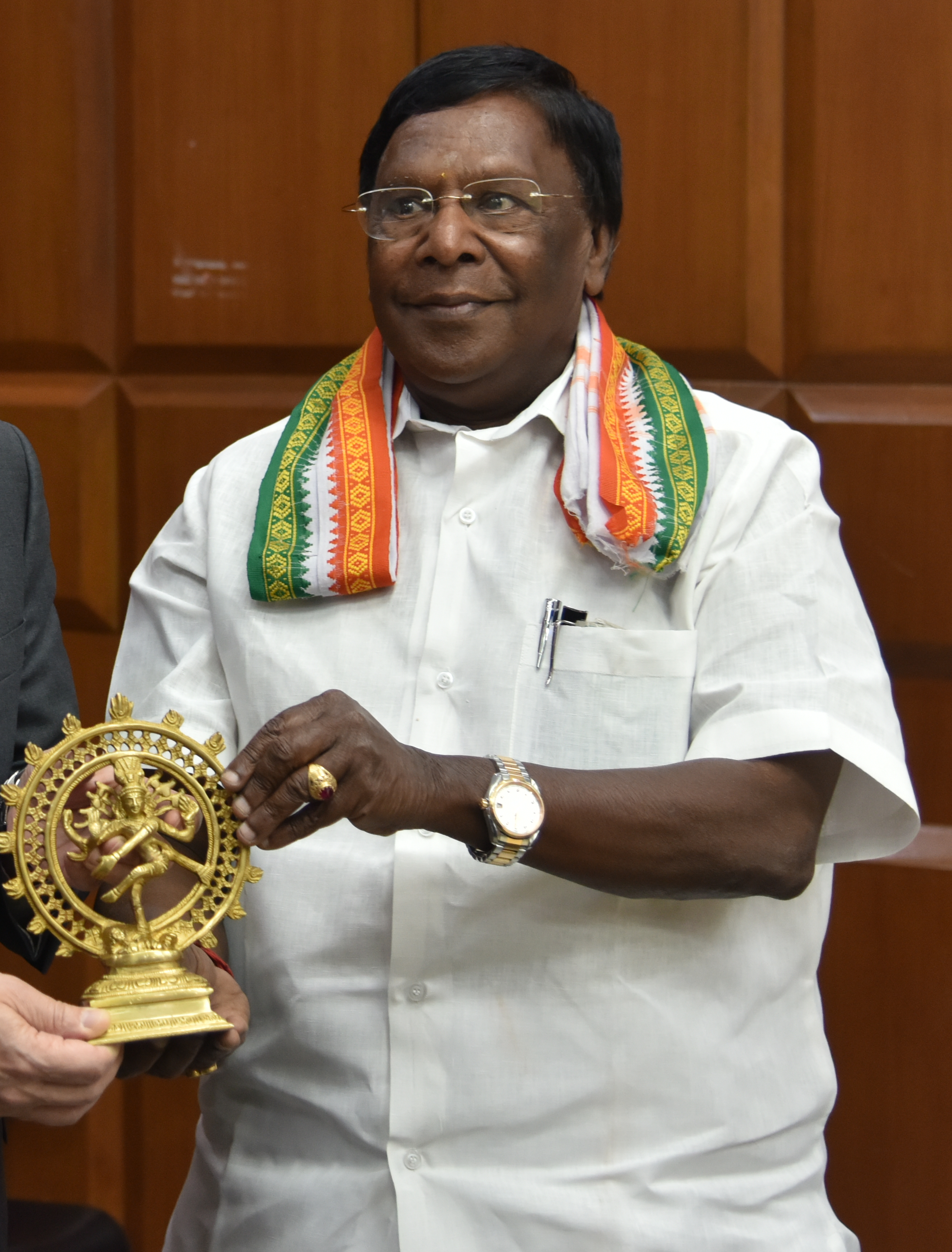
- Narayanaswami in 2016

10th Chief Minister of Puducherry
- In office 6 June 2016 – 22 February 2021
- Lieutenant Governor: Kiran Bedi; Tamilisai Soundararajan (additional charge)
- Preceded by: N. Rangaswamy
- Succeeded by: President's Rule
- Constituency: Nellithope

Union Minister of State for Personnel, Public Grievances and Pensions
- In office 22 May 2009 – 26 May 2014
- Minister: Manmohan Singh
- Preceded by: Suresh Pachouri
- Succeeded by: Jitendra Singh

Member of Parliament, Lok Sabha
- In office 2 June 2009 – 18 May 2014
- Preceded by: M. Ramadass
- Succeeded by: R. Radhakrishnan
- Constituency: Puducherry

Union Minister of State for Parliamentary Affairs
- In office 22 May 2004 – 22 May 2009
- Minister: Ghulam Nabi Azad (2004–2005); Priya Ranjan Dasmunsi (2005–2008); Vayalar Ravi (2008–2009)
- Preceded by: Santosh Gangwar
- Succeeded by: Rajeev Shukla

Member of Parliament, Rajya Sabha
- In office 7 October 2003 – 16 May 2009
- Preceded by: C. P. Thirunavukkarasu
- Succeeded by: P. Kannan
- Constituency: Puducherry
- In office 5 August 1985 – 4 August 1997
- Preceded by: V. P. M. Samy
- Succeeded by: C. P. Thirunavukkarasu
- Constituency: Puducherry

Personal details
- Born: Velu Narayanasamy; 30 May 1947 (age 79) Pondichéry, French India (present-day Puducherry, India)
- Party: Indian National Congress
- Spouse: Kalai Sevi (m. 1977)
- Children: 2
- Occupation: Politician

Velu Narayanasamy (born 30 May 1947) is an Indian politician who served as the 10th Chief Minister of Puducherry from 2016 to 2021. He is a member of the Indian National Congress.

He previously served as Member of Parliament, representing Puducherry in the Lok Sabha. He served as a Union Minister of State in the Prime Minister's Office in the Manmohan Singh government.

In the 2014 general elections, he was defeated by the NDA candidate R. Radhakrishnan, who was backed by the ruling All India N.R. Congress. He is a member of the Congress Working Committee as well as All India Congress Committee's General Secretary.

== Early life ==
V. Narayanasamy was born in Pondicherry, the son of Velu, and Iswary. He did his B.A. from Tagore Arts College, Pondicherry. B.L. from Madras Law College, Chennai and M.L. from Annamalai University.

== Political career ==
V. Narayanasamy served three tenures as Rajya Sabha MP and was a member of Lok Sabha from Puducherry constituency from 2009 to 2014. He was minister of state in Prime Minister's office in Manmohan Singh's second government as well as minister of state, Parliamentary Affairs in the first UPA government.

== Chief Minister ==
He was named the Chief Minister of Puducherry in May 2016 after Indian National Congress and Dravida Munnetra Kazhagam alliance won Puducherry Legislative Assembly election.

He was chosen over Namassivayam who was candidate for Chief Minister of Puducherry in that year election.

On 6 June 2016, he replaced N. Rangaswamy and was sworn in as Chief Minister of Puducherry. (Note: A. Johnkumar vacated his seat nellithope to contest)

On 22 February 2021, Narayanasamy resigned from the post after the Congress government lost its majority in the legislative assembly and the trust vote on floor.

== Elections Contested ==
=== Lok Sabha ===
Year	Constituency	Party	Votes	%	Opponent	Opponent Party	Opponent Votes	%	Result	Margin	%
2009	Puducherry	INC	300,391	49.41	M. Ramadass	PMK	208,619	34.32	Won	91,772	15.09
2014	Puducherry	INC	194,972	26.35	Radhakrishnan	AINRC	255,826	34.57	Lost	-60,854	-8.22

=== Rajya Sabha ===
Position	Party	Constituency	From	To	Tenure
Member of Parliament, Rajya Sabha (1st Term)	INC	Puducherry	5 August 1985	4 August 1991	11 years, 364 days
Member of Parliament, Rajya Sabha (2nd Term)	INC	Puducherry	5 August 1991	4 August 1997	11 years, 364 days
Member of Parliament, Rajya Sabha (3rd Term)	INC	Puducherry	7 October 2003	16 May 2009	5 years, 221 days

=== Puducherry Legislative Assembly ===
Year	Constituency	Party	Votes	%	Opponent	Opponent Party	Opponent Votes	%	Result	Margin	%
2016	Nellithope (by-election)	INC	18,506	69.07	Omsakthi Sekar	AIADMK	6,365	23.75	Won	12,141	45.31

== See also ==
- V. Narayanasamy ministry

Lok Sabha
Preceded by M. Ramadass	Member of Parliament for Puducherry; 2009 – 2014	Succeeded by R. Radhakrishnan
Political offices
Preceded by N. Rangaswamy	Member of Parliament for Chief minister of Puducherry; 2016 – 2021	Succeeded by President's rule
