= V. P. M. Samy =

Indian politician

V P M Samy is an Indian politician from Puducherry.

He was elected to the Rajya Sabha, the upper house of the Indian Parliament, for the term 1977-1983 from the All India Anna Dravida Munnetra Kazhagam party.
