= C. P. Thirunavukkarasu =

Indian politician

Chinnamma Chilikamma (CP) Thirunavukkarasu is an Indian politician from Puducherry union territory.

A member of the Dravida Munnetra Kazhagam (DMK) party, he was elected to the Rajya Sabha, the upper house of the Indian Parliament, for the 1997–2003 term.
