= Member of the Legislative Assembly (India) =

Member of a State Legislature in India

- Emblem of India

- Flag of India
- Legislative Assembly
- Abbreviation: MLA
- Reports to: Speaker and Deputy Speaker of the Respective Legislative Assemblies of India
- Nominator: Elected By Voting
- Term length: 5 Years
- Inaugural holder: 1952 State Legislative Assembly
- Formation: 1952 (74 years ago)

A member of the Legislative Assembly (MLA) is a representative elected by the voters of an electoral district (constituency) to the legislature of a state government in the Indian system of government. From each constituency, the people elect one representative who then becomes a member of the Legislative Assembly (MLA). Each state has between seven and nine MLAs for every Member of Parliament (MP) that it has in the Lok Sabha, the lower house of India's bicameral parliament. There are also members in three unicameral legislatures in Union Territories: the Delhi Legislative Assembly, Jammu and Kashmir Legislative Assembly and the Puducherry Legislative Assembly. Only an MLA can work as a minister for more than six months. If a non-MLA becomes a Chief Minister or a minister, they must become an MLA within six months to continue in the job. Only an MLA can become the Speaker of the Legislature.

== Introduction ==
In states where there are two houses, there is a State Legislative Council, and a State Legislative Assembly. In such a case, the Legislative Council is the upper house, while the Legislative Assembly is the lower house of the state legislature.

The Governor shall not be a member of the Legislature or Parliament, shall not hold any office of profit, and shall be entitled to emoluments and allowances. (Article 158 of the Indian constitution).

The Legislative Assembly consists of not more than 500 members and not fewer than 60. The biggest state, Uttar Pradesh, has 403 members in its Assembly. States which have small populations and are small in size have a provision for having an even smaller number of members in the Legislative Assembly. Puducherry has 33 members, of which three are nominated by central government. Mizoram and Goa have only 40 members each. Sikkim has 32. All members of the Legislative Assembly are elected based on adult franchise, and one member is elected from one constituency. Until January 2020, the President had the power to nominate two Anglo Indians to the Lok Sabha and the Governor had the power to nominate one member from the Anglo Indian community deems fit if the governor thinks that they are not adequately represented in the Assembly. In January 2020, the Anglo-Indian reserved seats in the Parliament and State legislatures of India were abolished by the 104th Constitutional Amendment Act, 2019.

== Nominated MLAs in states and UTs ==
Up to three MLAs can be nominated in the union territory of Puducherry by the central government who enjoy equal powers as elected MLAs. As clarified by the Supreme Court of India, these MLAs hold the same voting powers as the elected MLAs.

Since 2019, Jammu and Kashmir has five nominated MLAs. The nominated MLAs are appointed by the lieutenant governor and enjoy the same voting powers as the elected MLA's.

== Qualification ==
The qualifications to become a member of the Legislative Assembly are largely similar to the qualifications to be a member of Parliament.

1. The person should be a citizen of India.
2. Not less than 25 years of age to be a member of the Legislative Assembly and not less than 30 years (as per Article 173 of Indian Constitution) to be a member of the Legislative Council.
3. No person can become a member of the Legislative Assembly or the Legislative Council of any state unless the individual is a voter from any constituency of the state. Those who cannot become members of Parliament also cannot become members of the state legislature.
4. The person should not be convicted of any offence and sentenced to imprisonment of 2 years or more.
5. Person must be sound of mind.

== Term ==
The term of the Legislative Assembly is five years. However, it may be dissolved earlier than that by the Governor at the request of the Chief Minister, when the Chief Minister has actual majority support in the Assembly. The Assembly may be dissolved earlier if no one can prove majority support and become Chief Minister. The term of the Legislative Assembly may be extended during an emergency, but not more than six months at a time. The Legislative Council is the upper house of the State. Just like the Rajya Sabha, it is a permanent House. The members of the state's upper house are selected based on the strength of each party in the lower house and by state gubernatorial nomination. The term is six years, and a third of the members of the House retire after every two years. The upper house of a state legislature, known as a state legislative council, unlike the upper house of the Parliament, can be abolished by the lower house, if it passes a specific law bill, which states to dissolve the upper house, and gets it attested in both houses of parliament and then signed by the president into law. Only Andhra Pradesh, Bihar, Karnataka, Maharashtra, Telangana, and Uttar Pradesh have their upper houses in existence with a six-year term. All other states have abolished the upper house by the above-mentioned method, as the upper house causes unnecessary problems, expenditures and issues.

== Powers ==
The most important function of the legislature is law-making. The state legislature has the power to make laws on all items on which Parliament cannot legislate. Some of these items are police, prisons, irrigation, agriculture, local governments, public health, pilgrimage, and burial grounds. Some topics on which both Parliament and states can make laws are education, marriage and divorce, forests, and the protection of wild animals and birds.

As regards money bills, the position is the same. Bills can originate only in the Legislative Assembly. The Legislative Council can either pass the bill within 14 days of the date of the receipt of the Bill or suggest changes to it within 14 days. These changes may or may not be accepted by the Assembly.

The state legislature, besides making laws, has one electoral power, in electing the President of India. Elected members of the Legislative Assembly along with the elected members of Parliament are involved in this process.

Some parts of the Constitution can be amended by Parliament with the approval of half of the state legislatures. Thus, the state legislatures take part in the process of amendment to the Constitution.

== MLAs by states and union territories ==
Members of the state and union territory legislative assemblies by governing coalition and party bloc (As of 21 November 2026):

Composition of Indian State and Union Territory Legislative Assemblies (as of 21 November 2026)
State / UT	Total	Governing Party & Alliance		Main Opposition Party & Alliance		Other Parties / Blocs	IND	NOM	Vacant
State / UT	Total	Ruling Bloc	Governing Parties (Seats)	Opp. Bloc	Opposition Parties (Seats)	Party (Seats)	IND	NOM	Vacant
Andhra Pradesh	175	NDA (164)	TDP (135)	YSRCP (11)	YSRCP (11)	0	0	0	0
Andhra Pradesh	175	NDA (164)	JSP (21)	YSRCP (11)	YSRCP (11)	0	0	0	0
Andhra Pradesh	175	NDA (164)	BJP (8)	YSRCP (11)	YSRCP (11)	0	0	0	0
Arunachal Pradesh	60	NDA (56)	BJP (46)	INDIA (1)	INC (1)	0	3	0	0
Arunachal Pradesh	60	NDA (56)	PPA (6)	INDIA (1)	INC (1)	0	3	0	0
Arunachal Pradesh	60	NDA (56)	NCP (3)	INDIA (1)	INC (1)	0	3	0	0
Arunachal Pradesh	60	NDA (56)	NPP (1)	INDIA (1)	INC (1)	0	3	0	0
Assam	126	NDA (102)	BJP (82)	INDIA (20)	INC (19)	AIUDF (2)	0	0	0
Assam	126	NDA (102)	AGP (10)	INDIA (20)	INC (19)	AIUDF (2)	0	0	0
Assam	126	NDA (102)	BPF (10)	INDIA (20)	MAITC (1)	RD (2)	0	0	0
Bihar	243	NDA (201)	BJP (88)	MGB (INDIA) (35)	RJD (25)	AIMIM (5)	0	0	0
Bihar	243	NDA (201)	JD(U) (85)	MGB (INDIA) (35)	INC (6)	AIMIM (5)	0	0	0
Bihar	243	NDA (201)	LJP(RV)(19)	MGB (INDIA) (35)	CPI(ML)L (2)	JSP (1)	0	0	0
Bihar	243	NDA (201)	HAM(S) (5)	MGB (INDIA) (35)	CPI(M) (1)	BSP (1)	0	0	0
Bihar	243	NDA (201)	RLM (4)	MGB (INDIA) (35)	IIP (1)	BSP (1)	0	0	0
Chhattisgarh	90	NDA (53)	BJP (53)	INDIA (35)	INC (35)	GGP (1)	0	0	1
Delhi	70	NDA (48)	BJP (48)	AAP (22)	AAP (22)	0	0	0	0
Goa	40	NDA (28)	BJP (26)	INDIA (3)	INC (3)	AAP (2)	3	0	2
Goa	40	NDA (28)	BJP (26)	INDIA (3)	INC (3)	RGP (1)	3	0	2
Goa	40	NDA (28)	MGP (2)	INDIA (3)	INC (3)	GFP (1)	3	0	2
Gujarat	182	NDA (162)	BJP (162)	INDIA (13)	INC (12)	AAP (3)	3	0	1
Gujarat	182	NDA (162)	BJP (162)	INDIA (13)	SP (1)	AAP (3)	3	0	1
Haryana	90	NDA (48)	BJP (48)	INDIA (37)	INC (37)	INLD (2)	3	0	0
Himachal Pradesh	68	INDIA (39)	INC (39)	NDA (28)	BJP (28)	0	0	0	1
Jammu and Kashmir	95	INDIA (48)	JKNC (41)	NDA (29)	BJP (29)	JKPDP (4)	6	5 (Note: Five members are nominated by the Lieutenant Governor under the Jammu and Kashmir Reorganisation Act, 2019.)	0
Jammu and Kashmir	95	INDIA (48)	JKNC (41)	NDA (29)	BJP (29)	AAP (1)	6	5	0
Jammu and Kashmir	95	INDIA (48)	INC (6)	NDA (29)	BJP (29)	JKAIP (1)	6	5	0
Jammu and Kashmir	95	INDIA (48)	CPI(M) (1)	NDA (29)	BJP (29)	JKPC (1)	6	5	0
Jharkhand	81	MGB (INDIA) (55)	JMM (33)	NDA (24)	BJP (21)	JLKM (1)	0	0	1
Jharkhand	81	MGB (INDIA) (55)	INC (16)	NDA (24)	AJSU (1)	JLKM (1)	0	0	1
Jharkhand	81	MGB (INDIA) (55)	RJD (4)	NDA (24)	JD(U) (1)	JLKM (1)	0	0	1
Jharkhand	81	MGB (INDIA) (55)	CPI(ML)L (2)	NDA (24)	LJP(RV) (1)	JLKM (1)	0	0	1
Karnataka	224	INDIA (140)	INC (137)	NDA (81)	BJP (63)	SKP (1)	1	0	1
Karnataka	224	INDIA (140)	IND (3)	NDA (81)	JD(S) (18)	SKP (1)	1	0	1
Keralam	140	UDF (INDIA) (99)	INC (63)	LDF (35)	CPI(M) (26)	BJP (3)	3	0	0
Keralam	140	UDF (INDIA) (99)	IUML (22)	LDF (35)	CPI(M) (26)	BJP (3)	3	0	0
Keralam	140	UDF (INDIA) (99)	KEC (7)	LDF (35)	CPI(M) (26)	BJP (3)	3	0	0
Keralam	140	UDF (INDIA) (99)	RSP (3)	LDF (35)	CPI (8)	BJP (3)	3	0	0
Keralam	140	UDF (INDIA) (99)	RMPI (1)	LDF (35)	CPI (8)	BJP (3)	3	0	0
Keralam	140	UDF (INDIA) (99)	DCK (1)	LDF (35)	CPI (8)	BJP (3)	3	0	0
Keralam	140	UDF (INDIA) (99)	CMP (1)	LDF (35)	RJD (1)	BJP (3)	3	0	0
Keralam	140	UDF (INDIA) (99)	KC(J) (1)	LDF (35)	RJD (1)	BJP (3)	3	0	0
Madhya Pradesh	230	NDA (165)	BJP (165)	INDIA (65)	INC (64)	0	0	0	0
Madhya Pradesh	230	NDA (165)	BJP (165)	INDIA (65)	BAP (1)	0	0	0	0
Maharashtra	288	Maha Yuti (NDA) (234)	BJP (132)	MVA (INDIA) (50)	SS(UBT) (20)	AIMIM (1)	3	0	0
Maharashtra	288	Maha Yuti (NDA) (234)	SS (57)	MVA (INDIA) (50)	INC (16)	AIMIM (1)	3	0	0
Maharashtra	288	Maha Yuti (NDA) (234)	NCP (41)	MVA (INDIA) (50)	NCP-SP (10)	AIMIM (1)	3	0	0
Maharashtra	288	Maha Yuti (NDA) (234)	JSS (2)	MVA (INDIA) (50)	SP (2)	AIMIM (1)	3	0	0
Maharashtra	288	Maha Yuti (NDA) (234)	RSPS (1)	MVA (INDIA) (50)	CPI(M) (1)	AIMIM (1)	3	0	0
Maharashtra	288	Maha Yuti (NDA) (234)	RSVA (1)	MVA (INDIA) (50)	PWPI (1)	AIMIM (1)	3	0	0
Manipur	60	NDA (51)	BJP (36)	INDIA (7)	INC (5)	0	0	0	2
Manipur	60	NDA (51)	NPP (6)	INDIA (7)	INC (5)	0	0	0	2
Manipur	60	NDA (51)	NPF (5)	INDIA (7)	INC (5)	0	0	0	2
Manipur	60	NDA (51)	JD(U) (1)	INDIA (7)	KPA (2)	0	0	0	2
Manipur	60	NDA (51)	IND (3)	INDIA (7)	KPA (2)	0	0	0	2
Meghalaya	60	MDA (NDA) (51)	NPP (36)	INDIA (5)	MAITC (5)	VPP (4)	0	0	0
Meghalaya	60	MDA (NDA) (51)	BJP (10)	INDIA (5)	MAITC (5)	VPP (4)	0	0	0
Meghalaya	60	MDA (NDA) (51)	UDP (1)	INDIA (5)	MAITC (5)	VPP (4)	0	0	0
Meghalaya	60	MDA (NDA) (51)	HSPDP (2)	INDIA (5)	MAITC (5)	VPP (4)	0	0	0
Meghalaya	60	MDA (NDA) (51)	IND (2)	INDIA (5)	MAITC (5)	VPP (4)	0	0	0
Mizoram	40	ZPM (27)	ZPM (27)	MNF (10)	MNF (10)	BJP (2)	0	0	0
Mizoram	40	ZPM (27)	ZPM (27)	MNF (10)	MNF (10)	INC (1)	0	0	0
Nagaland	60	PDA (NDA) (60)	NPF (39)	No Opposition (0)		0	0	0	0
Nagaland	60	PDA (NDA) (60)	BJP (12)	No Opposition (0)		0	0	0	0
Nagaland	60	PDA (NDA) (60)	LJP(RV) (2)	No Opposition (0)		0	0	0	0
Nagaland	60	PDA (NDA) (60)	RPI(A) (2)	No Opposition (0)		0	0	0	0
Nagaland	60	PDA (NDA) (60)	IND (5)	No Opposition (0)		0	0	0	0
Odisha	147	NDA (79)	BJP (79)	BJD (50)	BJD (50)	INC (14)	3	0	0
Odisha	147	NDA (79)	BJP (79)	BJD (50)	BJD (50)	CPI(M) (1)	3	0	0
Puducherry	33	NDA (18)	AINRC (12)	SPA (6)	DMK (5)	TVK (2)	3	3 (Note: Three members are nominated by the Union Government.)	0
Puducherry	33	NDA (18)	BJP (4)	SPA (6)	DMK (5)	TVK (2)	3	3	0
Puducherry	33	NDA (18)	AIADMK (1)	SPA (6)	NMK (1)	INC (1)	3	3	0
Puducherry	33	NDA (18)	LJK (1)	SPA (6)	NMK (1)	INC (1)	3	3	0
Punjab	117	AAP (95)	AAP (95)	INDIA (16)	INC (16)	BJP (2)	1	0	0
Punjab	117	AAP (95)	AAP (95)	INDIA (16)	INC (16)	SAD (2)	1	0	0
Punjab	117	AAP (95)	AAP (95)	INDIA (16)	INC (16)	BSP (1)	1	0	0
Rajasthan	200	NDA (126)	BJP (117)	INDIA (71)	INC (67)	0	2	0	1
Rajasthan	200	NDA (126)	SS (2)	INDIA (71)	INC (67)	0	2	0	1
Rajasthan	200	NDA (126)	RLD (1)	INDIA (71)	BAP (4)	0	2	0	1
Rajasthan	200	NDA (126)	IND (6)	INDIA (71)	BAP (4)	0	2	0	1
Sikkim	32	SKM (NDA) (32)	SKM (32)	No Opposition (0)		0	0	0	0
Tamil Nadu	234	SSJVA (INDIA) (121)	TVK (108)	DMK+ (60)	DMK (59)	AIADMK (41)	1	0	6
Tamil Nadu	234	SSJVA (INDIA) (121)	INC (5)	DMK+ (60)	DMK (59)	AIADMK (41)	1	0	6
Tamil Nadu	234	SSJVA (INDIA) (121)	CPI(M) (2)	DMK+ (60)	DMK (59)	PMK (4)	1	0	6
Tamil Nadu	234	SSJVA (INDIA) (121)	CPI (2)	DMK+ (60)	DMK (59)	PMK (4)	1	0	6
Tamil Nadu	234	SSJVA (INDIA) (121)	VCK (2)	DMK+ (60)	DMDK (1)	BJP (1)	1	0	6
Tamil Nadu	234	SSJVA (INDIA) (121)	IUML (2)	DMK+ (60)	DMDK (1)	BJP (1)	1	0	6
Telangana	119	INDIA (76)	INC (75)	BRS (27)	BRS (27)	BJP (7)	1	0	1
Telangana	119	INDIA (76)	CPI (1)	BRS (27)	BRS (27)	AIMIM (7)	1	0	1
Tripura	60	NDA (47)	BJP (33)	SDF (INDIA) (13)	CPI(M) (10)	0	0	0	0
Tripura	60	NDA (47)	TMP (13)	SDF (INDIA) (13)	CPI(M) (10)	0	0	0	0
Tripura	60	NDA (47)	IPFT (1)	SDF (INDIA) (13)	INC (3)	0	0	0	0
Uttar Pradesh	403	NDA (289)	BJP (256)	INDIA (102)	SP (100)	JSD(L) (2)	4	0	6
Uttar Pradesh	403	NDA (289)	AD(S) (13)	INDIA (102)	SP (100)	JSD(L) (2)	4	0	6
Uttar Pradesh	403	NDA (289)	RLD (9)	INDIA (102)	SP (100)	JSD(L) (2)	4	0	6
Uttar Pradesh	403	NDA (289)	SBSP (6)	INDIA (102)	INC (2)	JSD(L) (2)	4	0	6
Uttar Pradesh	403	NDA (289)	NISHAD (5)	INDIA (102)	INC (2)	JSD(L) (2)	4	0	6
Uttarakhand	70	NDA (47)	BJP (47)	INDIA (20)	INC (20)	BSP (1)	1	0	1
West Bengal	294	NDA (209)	BJP (209)	DTC (65)	DTC (65)	MAITC (15)	0	0	0
West Bengal	294	NDA (209)	BJP (209)	DTC (65)	DTC (65)	INC (2)	0	0	0
West Bengal	294	NDA (209)	BJP (209)	DTC (65)	DTC (65)	AISF (1)	0	0	0
West Bengal	294	NDA (209)	BJP (209)	DTC (65)	DTC (65)	CPI(M) (1)	0	0	0
West Bengal	294	NDA (209)	BJP (209)	DTC (65)	DTC (65)	AJUP (1)	0	0	0
Total	4,131	3,025		916		120	38	8	24

== MLAs by party affiliation ==
#	Party	MLAs
1	Bharatiya Janata Party	1817
2	Indian National Congress	662
3	Telugu Desam Party	135
4	Aam Aadmi Party	123
5	Tamilaga Vettri Kazhagam	110
6	Samajwadi Party	103
7	Janata Dal (United)	87
8	Independent	71
9	Democratic Trinamool Congress	65
10	Dravida Munnetra Kazhagam	64
11	Shiv Sena	59
12	Nationalist Congress Party	44
12	Naga People's Front	44
14	Communist Party of India (Marxist)	43
14	National People's Party	43
16	All India Anna Dravida Munnetra Kazhagam	42
16	Biju Janata Dal	42
18	Jammu and Kashmir National Conference	41
19	Jharkhand Mukti Morcha	33
20	Sikkim Krantikari Morcha	32
21	Rashtriya Janata Dal	30
22	Bharat Rashtra Samithi	27
22	Zoram People's Movement	27
24	Indian Union Muslim League	24
25	Lok Janshakti Party (Ram Vilas)	22
26	Jana Sena Party	21
26	Mamata All India Trinamool Congress	21
28	Shiv Sena (Uddhav Balasaheb Thackeray)	20
29	Janata Dal (Secular)	18
30	Apna Dal (Sonelal)	13
30	All India Majlis-e-Ittehadul Muslimeen	13
30	Tipra Motha Party	13
33	All India N.R. Congress	12
34	Communist Party of India	11
34	YSR Congress Party	11
36	Asom Gana Parishad	10
36	Bodoland People's Front	10
36	Mizo National Front	10
36	Nationalist Congress Party (Sharadchandra Pawar)	10
36	Rashtriya Lok Dal	10
41	Kerala Congress	7
42	Suheldev Bharatiya Samaj Party	6
42	People's Party of Arunachal	6
44	Bharat Adivasi Party	5
44	Hindustani Awam Morcha	5
44	NISHAD Party	5
47	Communist Party of India (Marxist–Leninist) Liberation	4
47	Jammu and Kashmir Peoples Democratic Party	4
47	Pattali Makkal Katchi	4
47	Rashtriya Lok Morcha	4
47	Voice of the People Party	4
52	Bahujan Samaj Party	3
52	Revolutionary Socialist Party	3
55	All India United Democratic Front	2
55	Hill State People's Democratic Party	2
55	Indian National Lok Dal	2
55	Jan Surajya Shakti	2
55	Jansatta Dal (Loktantrik)	2
55	Kuki People's Alliance	2
55	Maharashtrawadi Gomantak Party	2
55	Raijor Dal	2
55	Republican Party of India (Athawale)	2
55	Shiromani Akali Dal	2
55	Viduthalai Chiruthaigal Katchi	2
65	All India Secular Front	1
65	Aam Janata Unnayan Party	1
65	All Jharkhand Students Union	1
65	Communist Marxist Party	1
65	Desiya Murpokku Dravida Kazhagam	1
65	Goa Forward Party	1
65	Gondwana Ganatantra Party	1
65	Indian Inclusive Party	1
65	Indigenous People's Front of Tripura	1
65	Jammu and Kashmir People's Conference	1
65	Jammu and Kashmir Awami Ittehad Party	1
65	Jan Suraaj Party	1
65	Jharkhand Loktantrik Krantikari Morcha	1
65	Kerala Congress (Jacob)	1
65	Kerala Democratic Party	1
65	Latchiya Jananayaka Katchi	1
65	Neyam Makkal Kazhagam	1
65	Peasants and Workers Party of India	1
65	Rajendra Patil Yadravkar	1
65	Rashtriya Samaj Paksha	1
65	Revolutionary Goans Party	1
65	Revolutionary Marxist Party of India	1
65	Sarvodaya Karnataka Paksha	1
65	United Democratic Party	1
Vacant		32
Total		4131

== See also ==
- Election Commission of India
- 2024 elections in India
- List of members of the 18th Lok Sabha
- Member of the Legislative Assembly
- List of current members of the Rajya Sabha
- Rajya Sabha
