= 1980 Pondicherry Legislative Assembly election =

Indian union territory election

- 1 March 1980

30 seats in the Puducherry Legislative Assembly 16 seats needed for a majority
- Registered: 319,137
- Turnout: 80.41%

	Majority party	Minority party
Leader	M. D. R. Ramachandran
Party	DMK	INC(I)
Seats before	3	2
Seats won	14	10
Seat change	▲11	▲8
Popular vote	27.73%	23.92%
CM before election
President's rule
Elected CM
M. D. R. Ramachandran
DMK

Elections to the Puducherry Legislative Assembly were held in March 1980, to elect members of the 30 constituencies in Puducherry (then known as Pondicherry), in India. The Dravida Munnetra Kazhagam won the popular vote and the most seats, and M. D. R. Ramachandran was appointed as the Chief Minister of Puducherry.

== Background ==
After sweeping to power in Tamil Nadu in June 1977, M. G. Ramachandran led the AIADMK to victory in the Puducherry Assembly election in October, winning 14 seats , aided by the shared language and cultural ties between the two regions.

In 1978, Prime Minister Morarji Desai proposed merging smaller Union Territories with neighbouring states. Puducherry, a former French enclave, was considered for merger with Tamil Nadu (along with Karaikal), while Mahe and Yanam were proposed to be merged with Kerala and Andhra Pradesh, respectively. However, provisions in the treaty with France required the preservation of Puducherry’s distinct identity and mandated prior consultation with the French government before any change in its status.

MGR reportedly supported the proposal, describing it as a “bitter but helpful medicine,” triggering widespread opposition across the Union Territory. Despite being in power, local AIADMK leaders and cadres opposed the move. The AIADMK government was dismissed in November 1978, and anti-merger agitations in January 1979 turned violent. Following strong resistance from the opposition parties like DMK and Congress, the Centre abandoned the proposal. The controversy over a proposed merger, significantly dented AIADMK’s popularity, leading to its rout in the 1980 election, where it failed to win a single seat, paving the way for the DMK to form the government.

In the subsequent decades, political instability, defections, and dependence on the Centre, seen as contradictory to the Dravidian parties AIADMK and DMK advocacy of state autonomy, reportedly led them to view Puducherry as a political burden. Consequently, from the 1990s onward, their reduced focus enabled the Indian National Congress to re-emerge as a dominant force in the Union Territory.

== Results ==
Party	Votes	%	Seats	+/–
Dravida Munnetra Kazhagam	68,030	27.73	14	▲11
Indian National Congress (Indira)	58,680	23.92	10	▲8
Janata Party	22,892	9.33	3	▼4
Communist Party of India (Marxist)	4,944	2.02	1	▲1
Others	64,778	26.40	0	0
Independents	26,001	10.60	2	▼1
Total	245,325	100.00	30	0
Valid votes	245,325	95.60		
Invalid/blank votes	11,278	4.40		
Total votes	256,603	100.00		
Registered voters/turnout	319,137	80.41		
Source: ECI

== Elected members ==
Winner, runner-up, voter turnout, and victory margin in every constituency
Assembly Constituency		Turnout	Winner				Runner Up				Margin
#k	Names	%	Candidate	Party	Votes	%	Candidate	Party	Votes	%	Margin
1	Muthialpet	78.09%	G. Palani Raja	DMK	7,396	63.71%	A. V. Vaithilingam	AIADMK	3,456	29.77%	3,940
2	Cassicade	72.91%	V. Kathirvelu	INC(I)	3,948	51.63%	Ansari P. Duraisamy	JP	1,716	22.44%	2,232
3	Raj Bhavan	65.46%	L. Joseph Mariadass	DMK	1,880	45.92%	V. Subbiah	CPI	1,082	26.43%	798
4	Bussy	73.12%	C. M. Achraff	INC(I)	2,898	69.36%	R. P. Joseph	AIADMK	716	17.14%	2,182
5	Oupalam	77.39%	Sitha Vedanayagam	DMK	5,419	70.06%	C. N. Parthasarathy	AIADMK	2,177	28.14%	3,242
6	Orleampeth	75.61%	Na. Manimaran Alias Na. Marimuthu	DMK	5,721	59.70%	P. K. Loganathan	AIADMK	2,820	29.43%	2,901
7	Nellithope	77.64%	P. Ramalingam	DMK	4,019	53.80%	B. Manimaran	AIADMK	2,110	28.25%	1,909
8	Mudaliarpet	82.30%	V. Kothandaraman Sababathy	INC(I)	5,258	48.39%	M. Manjini	CPI	2,950	27.15%	2,308
9	Ariankuppam	81.94%	P. Subbarayan	DMK	5,900	57.57%	M. Pandurangan	AIADMK	3,628	35.40%	2,272
10	Embalam	83.58%	G. Murugesan	INC(I)	5,033	68.30%	N. Ramajayam	AIADMK	1,773	24.06%	3,260
11	Nettapakkam	89.86%	R. Subbaraya Gounder	JP	4,201	49.89%	V. Vaithilingam	INC(I)	4,076	48.40%	125
12	Kuruvinatham	88.52%	M. A. Shanmugam	DMK	3,738	42.59%	K. R. Subramaniya Padayachi	JP	2,725	31.05%	1,013
13	Bahour	84.08%	P. Uthiravelu	JP	4,154	51.40%	A. Ramamurthy	CPI	2,562	31.70%	1,592
14	Thirubuvanai	79.81%	P. Cattavarayane	INC(I)	6,001	72.08%	D. Annamalai	AIADMK	2,269	27.26%	3,732
15	Mannadipet	89.22%	D. Ramachandran	DMK	5,598	61.09%	S. Manickavachakan	AIADMK	3,566	38.91%	2,032
16	Ossudu	80.70%	P. Murthy	DMK	5,122	66.48%	K. Dhakshinamurthy	AIADMK	2,374	30.82%	2,748
17	Villianur	82.20%	M. Venugopal	DMK	3,810	44.23%	S. Sellappan Alias Meenakshisundaram	AIADMK	3,065	35.58%	745
18	Ozhukarai	84.39%	G. Perumal Raja	DMK	5,493	65.98%	R. Somasimdara	AIADMK	2,685	32.25%	2,808
19	Thattanchavady	78.86%	V. Pethaperumal	JP	4,824	48.85%	N. Kandeban	CPI	2,554	25.86%	2,270
20	Reddiarpalayam	76.53%	Renuka Appadurai	INC(I)	5,409	52.49%	N. Gurusamy	CPI	2,516	24.42%	2,893
21	Lawspet	82.88%	M. O. H. Farook	INC(I)	8,980	78.68%	G. Gopalakrishnan	AIADMK	2,126	18.63%	6,854
22	Cotchery	84.62%	G. Panjavarnam	DMK	4,133	49.93%	T. Subbaiya	Independent	2,504	30.25%	1,629
23	Karaikal North	68.80%	V. M. Salih Maricar	Independent	4,778	55.25%	M. Jembulingam	JP	2,194	25.37%	2,584
24	Karaikal South	78.17%	S. Savarirajan	INC(I)	4,867	64.40%	S. Ramassamy	AIADMK	2,218	29.35%	2,649
25	Neravy T R Pattinam	83.00%	V. M. C. Sivakumar	DMK	5,315	57.35%	V. M. C. Varada Pillai	AIADMK	3,953	42.65%	1,362
26	Thirunallar	84.00%	N. V. Ramalingam	DMK	3,573	44.44%	A. Soundararengam	AIADMK	3,400	42.29%	173
27	Nedungadu	83.45%	M. Chandirakasu	INC(I)	4,981	65.23%	P. Natesan	AIADMK	1,751	22.93%	3,230
28	Mahe	77.20%	K. V. Raghavan	CPI(M)	2,638	48.17%	C. V. Sulaiman Hajee	Independent	2,174	39.70%	464
29	Palloor	80.07%	N. K. Sachindranath	INC(I)	2,567	45.89%	A. V. Sreedharan	INC(U)	2,467	44.10%	100
30	Yanam	87.41%	Kamisetty Parasuram Naidu	Independent	2,433	48.43%	Abdul Khader Jeelani Mohammed	INC(I)	2,165	43.09%	268

== See also ==
- List of constituencies of the Puducherry Legislative Assembly
- 1980 elections in India
