= 2001 Pondicherry Legislative Assembly election =

Election in India

- 10 May 2001

30 seats in the Puducherry Legislative Assembly 16 seats needed for a majority
- Registered: 658,647
- Turnout: 70.10%

	Majority party	Minority party
Leader	P. Shanmugam	R. V. Janakiraman
Party	INC	DMK
Leader's seat	Yanam (won)
Seats before	9	7
Seats won	11	7
Seat change	▲2	Steady
CM before election
P. Shanmugam
INC
Elected CM
P. Shanmugam
INC

Elections to the Puducherry Legislative Assembly were held in 2001, to elect members of the 30 constituencies in Puducherry (then known as Pondicherry), in India. The Indian National Congress won the popular vote and the most seats, and P. Shanmugam was appointed as the Chief Minister of Puducherry.

== Schedule ==
Event	Date
Date for Nominations	16 April 2001
Last Date for filing Nominations	23 April 2001
Date for scrutiny of nominations	24 April 2001
Last date for withdrawal of candidatures	26 April 2001
Date of poll	10 May 2001
Date of counting	13 May 2001

== Seat allotments ==
Party/Alliance		Flag	Electoral symbol	Leader	Seats contested
INC+	Indian National Congress			P. Shanmugam	21
INC+	Tamil Maanila Congress			G. K. Moopanar	7
INC+	Communist Party of India			R. Nallakannu	2
NDA	Dravida Munnetra Kazhagam			M. Karunanidhi	15*
NDA	Puducherry Makkal Congress			P. Kannan	9
NDA	Bharatiya Janata Party			L. K. Advani	5
NDA	Janata Dal (United)			Nitish Kumar	1
AIADMK+	All India Anna Dravida Munnetra Kazhagam			J. Jayalalithaa	20
AIADMK+	Pattali Makkal Katchi			Dr. Ramadoss	10

NOTE:

- Including 2 Constituencies where Viduthalai Chiruthaigal Katchi contesting on Rising Sun symbol.

== List of Candidates ==
Constituency		INC+		NDA		AIADMK+PMK	
#	Name	Party	Candidate	Party	Candidate	Party	Candidate
1	Muthialpet	INC	G. Palaniraja	DMK	Raja Chandrasekaran	ADMK	A. Kasilingam
2	Cassicade	TMC	V. Balaji	PMC	K. Lakshminarayanan	PMK	R. Malar Mannan
3	Raj Bhavan	INC	A. Gandhiraj	DMK	S. P. Sivakumar	ADMK	M. Pandurangan
4	Bussy	CPI	A. Abdul Rachide	DMK	Annibal Kennedy	ADMK	S. Babu Ansardeen
5	Oupalamp	TMC	N. Naghamuthu	PMC	P. Pandian	ADMK	A. Anbalagan
6	Orleampeth	INC	C. Pandourangame	DMK	R. Siva	ADMK	G. Chezhian
7	Nellithope	INC	E. Puviarasu	DMK	R. V. Janakiraman	ADMK	Dr. J. Nannan
8	Modeliarpeth	INC	V. Sabapathy	DMK	Dr. M. A. S. Subramanian	ADMK	A. Ravindran
9	Ariankuppam	INC	K. Vinayagamourthy	DMK	S. Ilangovan	PMK	R. K. R. Anantharaman
10	Embalom (SC)	INC	N. Gangadaran	DMK	S. Palanivelu	ADMK	M. Nagamany
11	Nettapakkam	INC	V. Vaithilingam	PMC	V. Muthunarayanan	PMK	K. Dhanraju
12	Kuruvinatham	INC	T. Thiagarajan	PMC	R. Radhakrishnan	PMK	T. Vikkiraman
13	Bahour (SC)	TMC	M. Kandasamy	PMC	P. Rajavelu	PMK	K. Deivanayagam
14	Thirubuvanai (SC)	INC	P. Angalan	DMK	D. Angalan	ADMK	S. Arasi
15	Mannadipeth	INC	N. Rajaram	PMC	S. Srinivasan	ADMK	D. Ramachandran
16	Ossudu (SC)	TMC	P. Sundhararaju	PMC	A. Elumalai	PMK	S. Balaraman
17	Villenour	TMC	C. Djeacoumar	PMC	J. Narayanasamy	ADMK	Ramane
18	Ozhukarai	TMC	A. Namassivayam	DMK	N. Balane B.Sc.	ADMK	K. Natarajan
19	Thattanchavady	INC	N. Rangaswamy	JD(U)	V. Pethaperumal	ADMK	N. Ragupathy
20	Reddiarpalayam	CPI	R. Viswanathan	BJP	A. M. Krishnamurthy	PMK	N. G. Pannirselvam
21	Lawspet	INC	M. O. H. F. Shahjahan	DMK	N. Kesavan	ADMK	K. Kalaiselvi
22	Cotchery	INC	R. Nalamagarajan	BJP	S. Elangovan	PMK	M. Ramadass
23	Karaikal North	INC	S. Ramassamy	DMK	A. M. H. Nazeem	ADMK	A. J. Assana
24	Karaikal South	INC	A. V. Subramanian	PMC	V. K. Ganapathy	ADMK	S. P. Karuppaiya
25	Neravy-Grand Aldee	TMC	V. M. C. V. Ganapathy	DMK	V. M. C. Sivakumar	ADMK	V. M. C. Raja
26	Tirunallar	INC	R. Kamalakannan	DMK	N. V. R. Arivoli	PMK	S. Ambalavanan
27	Neduncadu (SC)	INC	M. Chandirakasu	DMK	A. Marimuthu	ADMK	P. Packirisamy
28	Mahe	INC	E. Valsaraj	BJP	East Namath Rajeendran	ADMK	K. Lakshmanan
29	Palloor	INC	A. V. Sreedharan	BJP	C. P. Ganeshan	PMK	N. K. Sachindranath
30	Yanam	INC	Elaprolu Chittibabu	BJP	Gollapalli G. Pratap	ADMK	Giddi Sri Hari Rao

== Results ==
Party	Votes	%	Seats	+/–
Indian National Congress	108,700	22.78	11	▲2
Dravida Munnetra Kazhagam	83,679	17.54	7	0
All India Anna Dravida Munnetra Kazhagam	59,926	12.56	3	0
Puducherry Makkal Congress	48,865	10.24	4	New
Tamil Maanila Congress	35,390	7.42	2	▼3
Bharatiya Janata Party	22,164	4.65	1	▲1
Others	66,981	14.04	0	0
Independents	51,402	10.77	2	0
Total	477,107	100.00	30	0
Valid votes	477,107	99.95		
Invalid/blank votes	252	0.05		
Total votes	477,359	100.00		
Registered voters/turnout	658,647	72.48		
Source: ECI

=== Results by Pre-Poll alliance ===
INC+	Contested	WON	NDA	Contested	WON	AIADMK+	Contested	WON	Others	WON
INC	21	11	DMK	13	7	AIADMK	20	3	IND	2
TMC	7	2	PMC	9	4	PMK	10	0		
CPI	2	0	BJP	5	1					
			DPI	2	0					
			JDU	1	0					
Total		13	Total		12	Total		3	Total	2
Change		▼3	Change		▲4	Change		▼1	Change	0

=== Results by Post-Poll alliance ===
INC+	SEATS	NDA	SEATS	Others	SEATS
INC	11	DMK	7	IND	2
TMC	2	PMC	4		
AIADMK	3	BJP	1		
Total	16	Total	12	Total	2

== Elected members ==
Winner, runner-up, voter turnout, and victory margin in every constituency
Assembly Constituency		Turnout	Winner				Runner Up				Margin
#k	Names	%	Candidate	Party	Votes	%	Candidate	Party	Votes	%	Margin
1	Muthialpet	64.67%	A. Kasilingam	AIADMK	6,857	38.02%	Raja Chandrasekaran	DMK	4,947	27.43%	1,910
2	Cassicade	68.44%	K. Lakshminarayanan	PMC	4,875	51.52%	R. Malar Mannan	PMK	3,097	32.73%	1,778
3	Raj Bhavan	65.75%	S. P. Sivakumar	DMK	2,408	57.79%	A. Gandhiraj	INC	1,308	31.39%	1,100
4	Bussy	51.02%	Annibal Kennedy	DMK	3,087	63.77%	S. Babu Ansardeen	AIADMK	904	18.67%	2,183
5	Oupalam	72.89%	A. Anbalagan	AIADMK	8,416	59.24%	P. Pandian	PMC	5,044	35.50%	3,372
6	Orleampeth	70.28%	R. Siva	DMK	7,608	49.41%	G. Chezhian	AIADMK	4,223	27.42%	3,385
7	Nellithope	75.41%	R. V. Janakiraman	DMK	7,780	51.42%	Dr. J. Nannan	AIADMK	5,839	38.59%	1,941
8	Mudaliarpet	73.23%	Dr. M. A. S. Subramanian	DMK	9,119	40.98%	V. Sababady Kothandraman	INC	7,616	34.22%	1,503
9	Ariankuppam	74.12%	T. Jayamoorthy	Independent	9,790	45.23%	K. R. Anantharaman	PMK	5,628	26.00%	4,162
10	Embalam	74.87%	N. Gangadaran	INC	3,723	25.44%	S. Palanivelu	DMK	3,087	21.10%	636
11	Nettapakkam	79.40%	V. Vaithilingam	INC	5,984	39.47%	K. Dhanraju	PMK	4,771	31.47%	1,213
12	Kuruvinatham	83.57%	R. Radhakrishnan	PMC	8,000	50.58%	T. Thiagarajan	INC	5,979	37.81%	2,021
13	Bahour	79.21%	P. Rajavelu	PMC	7,696	48.91%	M. Kandasamy	TMC(M)	5,063	32.18%	2,633
14	Thirubuvanai	76.21%	P. Angalane	INC	4,753	28.60%	Durai Arivudainambi	Independent	3,949	23.76%	804
15	Mannadipet	79.09%	D. Ramachandran	AIADMK	8,939	55.29%	N. Rajaram	INC	4,237	26.21%	4,702
16	Ossudu	81.22%	Abar Elumalai	PMC	5,364	34.65%	S. Balaraman	PMK	5,200	33.59%	164
17	Villianur	80.72%	C. Djeacoumar	TMC(M)	10,335	50.51%	J. Narayanasamy	PMC	6,246	30.52%	4,089
18	Ozhukarai	71.96%	A. Namassivayam	TMC(M)	10,164	45.49%	K. Natarajan	AIADMK	6,021	26.95%	4,143
19	Thattanchavady	67.87%	N. Rangaswamy	INC	14,323	58.90%	V. Pethaperumal	JD(U)	8,769	36.06%	5,554
20	Reddiarpalayam	70.12%	A. M. Krishnamurthy	BJP	11,446	44.85%	R. Viswanathan	CPI	7,985	31.29%	3,461
21	Lawspet	65.51%	M. O. H. F. Shahjahan	INC	12,929	38.51%	N. Kesavan	DMK	10,962	32.65%	1,967
22	Cotchery	71.10%	R. Nalamagarajan	INC	7,058	43.50%	M. Ramadass	PMK	5,382	33.17%	1,676
23	Karaikal North	61.17%	A. M. H. Nazeem	DMK	6,273	46.92%	A. J. Assana	AIADMK	3,969	29.69%	2,304
24	Karaikal South	69.85%	A. V. Subramanian	INC	6,138	51.39%	V. K. Ganapathy	PMC	5,229	43.78%	909
25	Neravy T R Pattinam	71.52%	V. M. C. Sivakumar	DMK	6,672	46.96%	V. M. C. V. Ganapathy	TMC(M)	3,741	26.33%	2,931
26	Thirunallar	74.22%	R. Kamalakkannan	INC	5,390	42.00%	N. V. R. Arivoli	DMK	4,615	35.96%	775
27	Nedungadu	76.17%	M. Chandirakasu	INC	5,720	45.35%	A. Marimuthu	DMK	4,660	36.95%	1,060
28	Mahe	72.95%	E. Valsaraj	INC	5,666	59.87%	Manoli Muhammad	Independent	3,131	33.08%	2,535
29	Palloor	71.01%	A. V. Sreedharan	INC	4,855	49.23%	P. Dineshan	CPI(M)	3,392	34.40%	1,463
30	Yanam	83.43%	Malladi Krishna Rao	Independent	8,959	57.34%	Gollapalli Gangadhara Pratap	BJP	5,981	38.28%	2,978

== See also ==
- List of constituencies of the Puducherry Legislative Assembly
- 2001 elections in India
