= 1996 Pondicherry Legislative Assembly election =

Indian union territory election

- 27 April 1996

30 seats in the Puducherry Legislative Assembly 16 seats needed for a majority
- Registered: 633,635
- Turnout: 75.33%
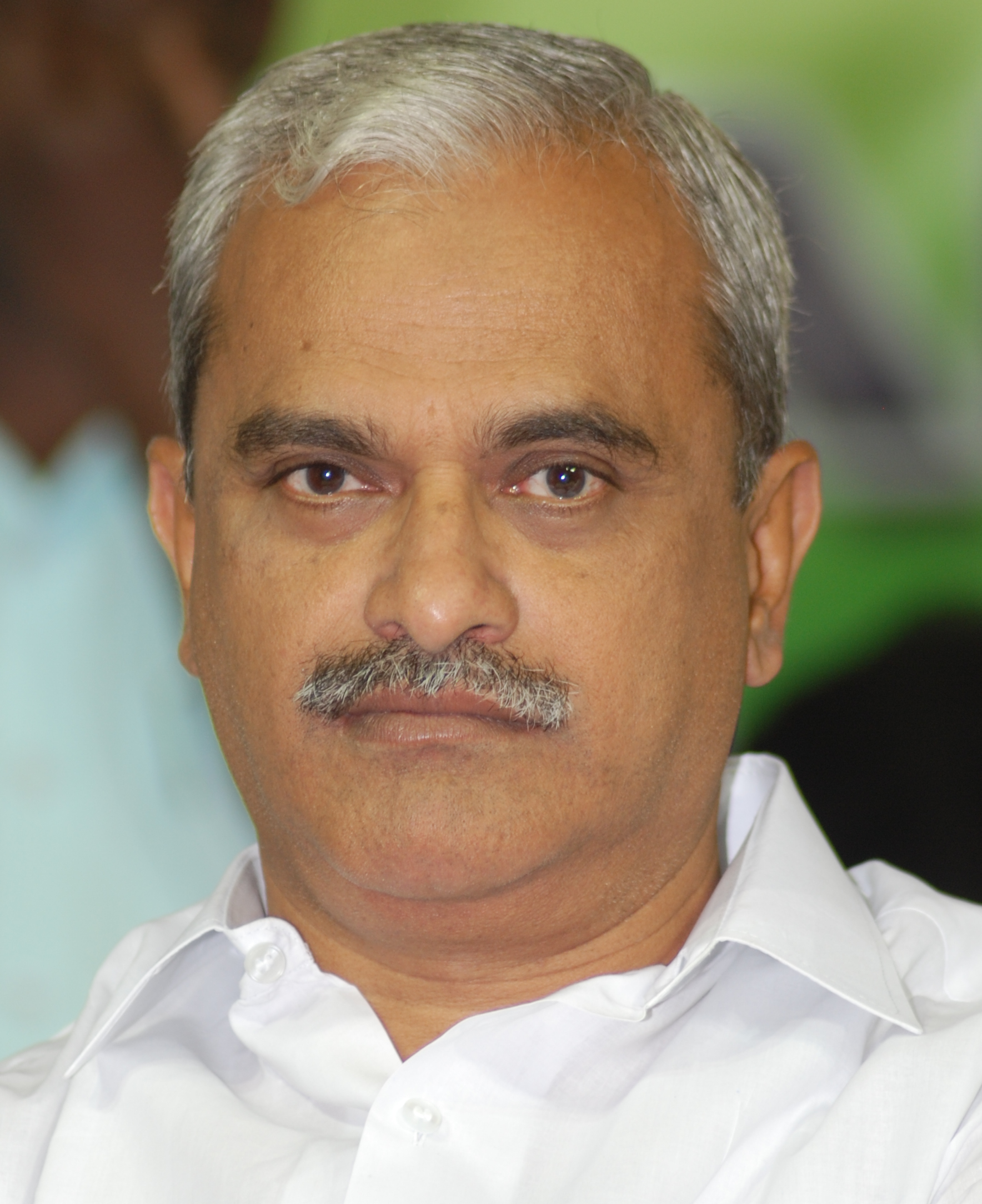

	Majority party	Minority party
Leader	V. Vaithilingam	R. V. Janakiraman
Party	INC	DMK
Seats before	15	4
Seats won	9	7
Seat change	▼6	▲3
Popular vote	28.39%	25.65%
CM before election
V. Vaithilingam
INC
Elected CM
R. V. Janakiraman
DMK

Elections to the Puducherry Legislative Assembly were held in April 1996, to elect members of the 30 constituencies in Puducherry (then known as Pondicherry), in India. The Indian National Congress won the most seats, but the Dravida Munnetra Kazhagam won the popular vote, and R. V. Janakiraman was appointed as the Chief Minister of Puducherry.

== Seat allotments ==
=== Congress Alliance ===
No.	Party	Election Symbol	Leader	Seats
1.	Indian National Congress		V. Vaithilingam	20
2.	All India Anna Dravida Munnetra Kazhagam		J. Jayalalithaa	10

=== DMK-led Alliance ===
No.	Party	Election Symbol	Leader	Seats
1.	Dravida Munnetra Kazhagam		M. Karunanidhi	18
2.	Tamil Maanila Congress		G. K. Moopanar	5
3.	Communist Party of India		Indrajit Gupta	3
4.	Independent			4

== List of Candidates ==
Constituency					
Constituency		INC+		DMK+	
1	Muthialpet	ADMK	S. Anandavelu	DMK	G. Palaniraja
2	Cassicade	INC	S. Narayanasamy	IND	P. Kannan
3	Raj Bhavan	INC	A. Gandhirasu	DMK	S.P. Sivakumar
4	Bussy	INC	C.M. Achraff	CPI	Abdul Rachide
5	Oupalam	ADMK	U.C. Arumugham	TMC	S. Rathinam @ Manohar
6	Orleampeth	ADMK	K. Parasuraman	DMK	R. Siva
7	Nellithope	ADMK	D. Ramachandiren	DMK	R.V. Janakiraman
8	Modeliarpeth	INC	V. Kothandaraman Sababathy	CPI	M. Manjini
9	Ariankuppam	ADMK	S. Sreedharan	DMK	T. Jayamoorthy
10	Embalom (SC)	INC	K. Pakkiriammal	DMK	P. Muthukrishnan
11	Nettapakkam	INC	V. Vaithilingam	DMK	P.M. Mathy @ Subbarayan
12	Kuruvinatham	INC	T. Thiagarajan	DMK	A. Annapoorni
13	Bahour (SC)	INC	P. Rajavelu	TMC	M. Kandasamy
14	Thirubuvanai (SC)	ADMK	S. Arasi	DMK	K. Jayaraj
15	Mannadipet	INC	N. Rajaram	TMC	K. Rajasegaran
16	Ossudu (SC)	INC	N. Marimuthu	TMC	V. Nagarathinam
17	Villenour	INC	P. Anandbaskaran	TMC	C. Jayakumar
18	Ozhukarai	ADMK	K. Natarajan	DMK	R.R. Somasundaram
19	Thattanchavady	INC	N. Rangasamy	DMK	V. Rathinavelu
20	Reddiarpalayam	ADMK	Na. Manimaran	CPI	R. Viswanathan
21	Lawspet	INC	M.O.H.F. Shajahan	DMK	N. Kesavan
22	Cotchery	INC	R. Nalamagarajan	DMK	S. Shanmugam
23	Karaikal	ADMK	H.M. Abdul Kader	DMK	A.M.H. Nazeem
24	Karaikal South	INC	A.V. Subramanian	DMK	S. Savarirajan
25	Neravy-Grand Aldee	ADMK	A.M.K. Balu	DMK	V.M.C. Sivakkumar
26	Tirunallar	INC	R. Kamalakannan	DMK	A. Soundarengan
27	Neduncadu (SC)	INC	M. Chandirakasu	DMK	A. Marimuthu
28	Mahe	INC	E. Valsaraj	IND	Manoly Muhammad
29	Palloor	INC	A.V. Sreedharan	IND	P.K. Sathyanandan
30	Yanam	INC	Velaga Rajeswara Rao	IND	Malladi Krishna Rao

== Results ==
Party	Votes	%	Seats	+/–
Indian National Congress	116,618	25.34	9	▼6
Dravida Munnetra Kazhagam	105,392	22.90	7	▲3
All India Anna Dravida Munnetra Kazhagam	57,678	12.53	3	▲3
Tamil Maanila Congress	42,485	9.23	5	New
Communist Party of India	29,964	6.51	2	▲1
Janata Dal	20,360	4.42	1	0
Pattali Makkal Katchi	11,544	2.51	1	New
Others	29,126	6.33	0	0
Independents	47,126	10.24	2	▼1
Total	460,293	100.00	30	0
Valid votes	460,293	96.43		
Invalid/blank votes	17,036	3.57		
Total votes	477,329	100.00		
Registered voters/turnout	633,635	75.33		
Source: ECI

== Elected members ==
Winner, runner-up, voter turnout, and victory margin in every constituency
Assembly Constituency		Turnout	Winner				Runner Up				Margin
#k	Names	%	Candidate	Party	Votes	%	Candidate	Party	Votes	%	Margin
1	Muthialpet	69.96%	S. Anandavelu	AIADMK	11,009	56.26%	G. Palani Raja	DMK	8,098	41.39%	2,911
2	Cassicade	66.08%	P. Kannan	IND	6,501	63.21%	S. Narayanasamy	INC	3,195	31.06%	3,306
3	Raj Bhavan	65.39%	S. P. Sivakumar	DMK	2,697	58.54%	A. Gandhirasu	INC	1,159	25.16%	1,538
4	Bussy	60.37%	C. M. Achraff	INC	2,208	46.26%	A. Abdul Rachide	CPI	1,378	28.87%	830
5	Oupalam	72.39%	S. Rathinam @ Manohar	TMC(M)	6,866	50.79%	U. C. Arumugam	AIADMK	5,866	43.39%	1,000
6	Orleampeth	68.14%	R. Siva	DMK	8,105	49.16%	K. Parasuraman	AIADMK	5,107	30.97%	2,998
7	Nellithope	69.88%	R. V. Janakiraman	DMK	8,803	52.31%	D. Ramachandiren	AIADMK	7,354	43.70%	1,449
8	Mudaliarpet	71.54%	M. Manjini	CPI	11,380	49.69%	V. Sababady Kothandraman	INC	8,278	36.15%	3,102
9	Ariankuppam	79.25%	S. Ramsingh	PMK	7,382	37.86%	T. Jayamoorthy	DMK	6,329	32.46%	1,053
10	Embalam	78.31%	R. Rajaraman	JD	8,311	62.73%	K. Pakkiriammal	INC	3,454	26.07%	4,857
11	Nettapakkam	83.58%	V. Vaithilingam	INC	7,563	54.86%	V. Muthunarayana Reddiar	IND	5,036	36.53%	2,527
12	Kuruvinatham	87.32%	T. Thiagarajan	INC	7,209	48.85%	R. Ramanathan	MDMK	7,022	47.58%	187
13	Bahour	83.48%	M. Kandasamy	TMC(M)	7,921	51.95%	P. Rajavelu	INC	7,221	47.36%	700
14	Thirubuvanai	79.23%	S. Arasi	AIADMK	5,707	37.08%	K. Jayaraj	DMK	5,586	36.29%	121
15	Mannadipet	82.77%	K. Rajasegaran	TMC(M)	8,113	51.63%	N. Rajaram	INC	6,866	43.69%	1,247
16	Ossudu	80.14%	V. Nagarathinam	TMC(M)	7,380	53.78%	N. Marimuthu	INC	5,232	38.13%	2,148
17	Villianur	83.35%	C. Jayakumar	TMC(M)	12,205	64.56%	P. Anandabaskaran	INC	6,509	34.43%	5,696
18	Ozhukarai	75.71%	K. Natarajan	AIADMK	7,794	41.10%	R. R. Somasundaram	DMK	6,252	32.97%	1,542
19	Thattanchavady	72.14%	N. Rangaswamy	INC	9,989	42.95%	V. Pethaperumal	JD	7,699	33.11%	2,290
20	Reddiarpalayam	62.82%	R. Viswanathan	CPI	17,206	65.58%	Na. Manimaran	AIADMK	5,966	22.74%	11,240
21	Lawspet	71.79%	N. Kesavan	DMK	16,442	54.40%	M. O. H. F. Shahjahan	INC	10,211	33.78%	6,231
22	Cotchery	78.37%	R. Nalamagarajan	INC	7,630	47.53%	G. Panjavarnam	IND	5,968	37.17%	1,662
23	Karaikal North	67.73%	A. M. H. Nazeem	DMK	9,474	71.01%	H. M. Abdul Kader	AIADMK	2,946	22.08%	6,528
24	Karaikal South	75.45%	A. V. Subramanian	INC	6,676	57.48%	S. Savarirajan	DMK	4,717	40.61%	1,959
25	Neravy T R Pattinam	78.01%	V. M. C. Sivakumar	DMK	7,595	53.44%	S. T. P. Diravidamani	IND	4,385	30.85%	3,210
26	Thirunallar	78.92%	R. Kamalakannan	INC	6,063	48.53%	A. Soundarengan	DMK	4,938	39.53%	1,125
27	Nedungadu	83.17%	A. Marimuthu	DMK	6,899	54.93%	M. Chandirakasu	INC	5,116	40.74%	1,783
28	Mahe	76.06%	E. Valsaraj	INC	4,184	45.58%	Manoli Muhammad	IND	3,915	42.65%	269
29	Palloor	74.44%	A. V. Sreedharan	INC	4,253	45.40%	Panangatil Khader	JD	2,929	31.27%	1,324
30	Yanam	86.68%	Malladi Krishna Rao	IND	8,445	62.31%	Velaga Rajeshwara Rao	INC	3,602	26.58%	4,843

== See also ==
- List of constituencies of the Puducherry Legislative Assembly
- 1996 elections in India
