= V. Vaithilingam =

Indian politician

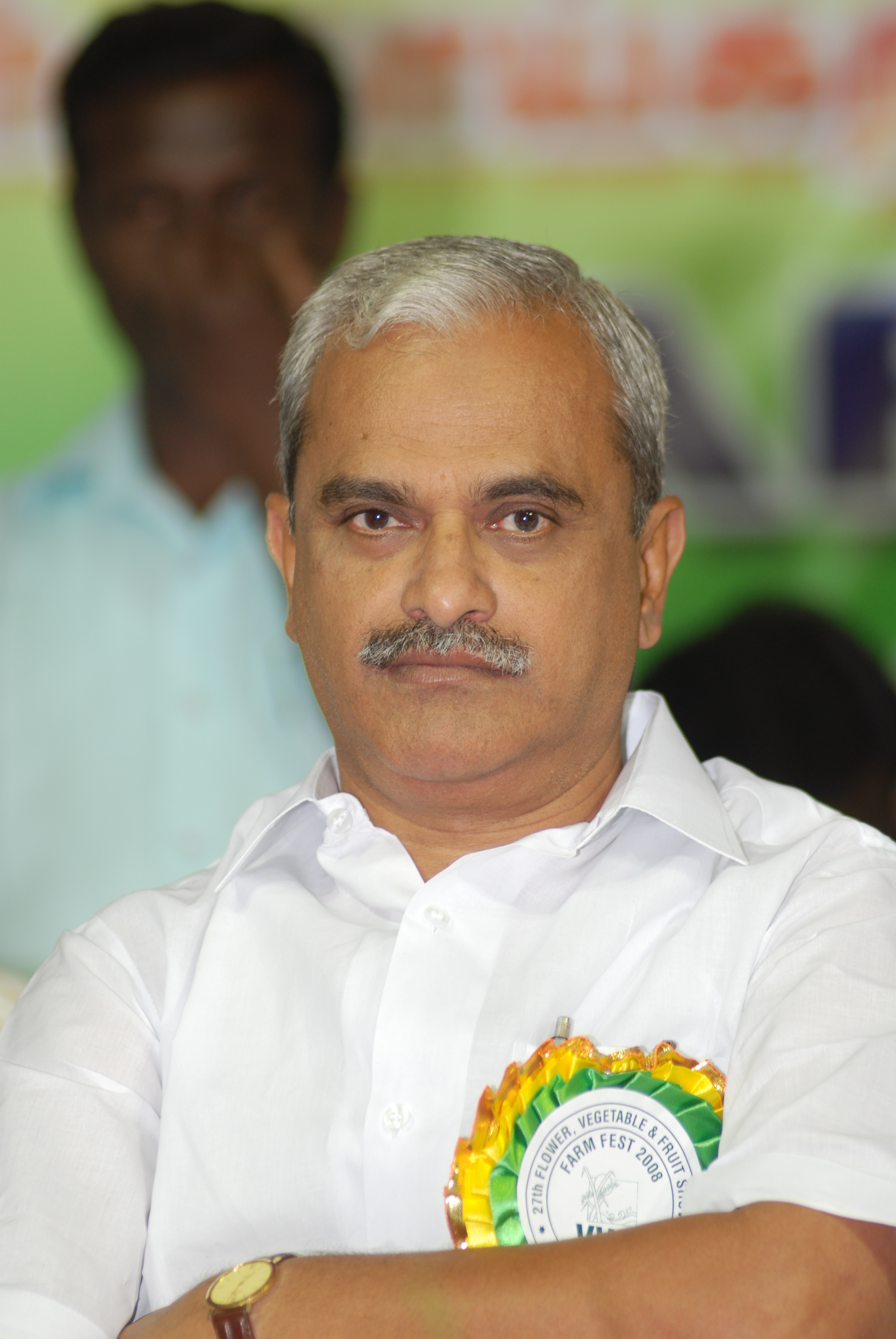
- V. Vaithilingam at 27th Flower, Vegetable and Fruit Show, Pondicherry

President of Puducherry Pradesh Congress Committee
- In office 9 June 2023 – 08 May 2026
- Preceded by: A. V. Subramanian

Member of Parliament, Lok Sabha
- Incumbent
- Assumed office 23 May 2019
- Preceded by: R. Radhakrishnan
- Constituency: Puducherry
- Majority: 136,516 (16.90%)

6th Chief Minister of Puducherry
- In office 4 July 1991 – 13 May 1996
- Preceded by: M. D. R. Ramachandran
- Succeeded by: R. V. Janakiraman
- In office 4 September 2008 – 15 May 2011
- Preceded by: N. Rangaswamy
- Succeeded by: N. Rangaswamy

Speaker of Puducherry Legislative Assembly
- In office 12 June 2016 – 21 March 2019
- Deputy: V.P. Sivakolundu
- Constituency: Kamaraj Nagar

Member of the Puducherry Legislative Assembly
- In office 13 May 2011 – 23 May 2019
- Preceded by: New constituency
- Succeeded by: A. Johnkumar
- Constituency: Kamaraj Nagar
- In office 13 May 1985 – 13 May 2011
- Preceded by: R. Subbaraya Gounder
- Succeeded by: L. Periyasamy
- Constituency: Nettapakkam

Personal details
- Born: Vaithilingam; 5 October 1950 (age 75) Cuddalore, Madras State, India
- Party: Indian National Congress
- Spouse: Sasikala
- Children: 1 son and 1 daughter
- Education: Loyola College, Chennai

V. Vaithilingam (born 5 October 1950) is an Indian politician belonging to the Indian National Congress, who currently represents Puducherry in the Lok Sabha. He held the position as the 11th Chief Minister of Pondicherry from 1991 to 1996 and the 16th Chief Minister of Puducherry again from 2008 to 2011. He is a senior legislator serving eight consecutive terms.

He headed the Pondicherry Government from 1991 to 1996 and the Congress Legislative party from 1991 to 2000. His priorities as Chief Minister were to minimize the budget deficit, increase private sector participation in public transport, and improve the health care system. He first became Chief Minister at the age of 40, making him the second youngest Chief Minister of Puducherry.

== Early life ==
He was born in Cuddalore and was raised in his native home Madukarai, Puducherry. After completing his schooling, he went to Loyola College in Chennai and later went to Madukkarai to take care of his family farms. In 1969, Vaithilingam married Miss Sasikala. He served as the Chairman of the Land Development Bank of Puducherry State.

The Vaithilingam family is known for their work as freedom fighters against French rule. His paternal grandfather late Vaithilingam Reddiar was the Mayor of Nettapakkam commune during the French rule in Puducherry. His father V. Venkatasubha Reddiar was a two time Chief Minister of Pondicherry.

== Political career ==
In 1980, at the age of 30, Vaithilingam ran for the Legislative Assembly and lost by a margin of 90 votes. In 1985, he was elected become Public Works and Power Minister, which he served until 1990. From 1991 to 1996 he served as the Chief Minister of Pondicherry. Under his administration, Pondicherry saw growth in the industrial and education sectors. He advocated for smaller government and greater participation of the private sector. Vaithilingam benefited from the economic liberalization policies followed by Prime Minister P. V. Narasimha Rao.

In 1996 elections, the Indian National Congress became the single largest party, but their alliance lost the elections and Vaithilingam was appointed the Leader of Opposition until 1999. In 2001, he won from Nettapakkam constituency, but was not able to serve as Chief Minister due to being falsely charged with an attempt to corrupt a fellow legislator. He was later acquitted on all charges. During this period, N. Rangaswamy was chosen as Chief Minister and Vaithilingam served as a Member of the Legislative Assembly in his cabinet until 2006.

From 2006 to 2008, Vaithilingam served as the Minister of Agriculture and Industries. He was elected Chief Minister in 2008 and he served until 2011. He became Leader of the Opposition in the 2011 election, became Speaker of the House in 2016, and resigned in 2019 after becoming a member of the Parliament of India for Puducherry.

In the 2019 Lok Sabha elections, V. Vaithilingam was chosen to represent the Indian National Congress party and defeated All India N.R. Congress candidate Dr. Narayanasamy Kesavan. In 2024, he was re-elected, defeating Bharatiya Janata Party candidate A. Namassivayam. As part of the Secular Progressive Alliance, he lost to N. Rangaswamy and placed fourth in the 2026 Puducherry Legislative Assembly election. He was defeated in Thattanchavady Assembly constituency and lost his security deposit.

== Electoral history ==
=== Legislative Assembly ===
Year	Constituency	Party	Votes	%	Opponent	Party	Votes	%	Result	Margin	%
2026	Thattanchavady	INC	2,990	12.68	N. Rangasamy	AINRC	10,024	42.51	Lost	▼7,034	▼29.83
2016	Kamaraj Nagar	INC	11,618	45.09	P. Ganesan	ADMK	6,512	25.27	Won	▲5,106	▲19.82
2011	Kamaraj Nagar	INC	12,570	59.01	Nara. Kalainathan	CPI	6,541	30.70	Won	▲6,029	▲28.31
2006	Nettapakkam	INC	9,166	52.24	V. Muthunarayanan	PMK	7,830	44.63	Won	▲1,336	▲7.61
2001	Nettapakkam	INC	5,984	39.47	K. Dhanraju	PMK	4,771	31.47	Won	▲1,213	▲8.00
1996	Nettapakkam	INC	7,563	54.86	V. Muthunarayana Reddiar	IND	5,036	36.53	Won	▲2,527	▲18.33
1991	Nettapakkam	INC	8,095	66.14	R. Subbaraya Counder	DMK	3,782	30.90	Won	▲4,313	▲35.24
1990	Nettapakkam	INC	7,332	55.34	N. Devadass	DMK	3,193	24.10	Won	▲4,139	▲31.24
1985	Nettapakkam	INC	6,946	72.94	P. Ramamurthy	DMK	2,577	27.06	Won	▲4,369	▲45.88
1980	Nettapakkam	INC(I)	4,076	48.40	R. Subbaraya Gounder	JP	4,201	49.89	Lost	▼125	▼1.49

=== Lok Sabha ===
- Member of Parliament

Year	Post	Constituency	Party	Opponent	Opposition Party	Result
2019	M.P	Puducherry	INC	Dr. Narayanasamy Kesavan	All India N.R. Congress	Won
2024	M.P	Puducherry	INC	A. Namassivayam	BJP	Won

== Comeback ==
In 2000, Vaithilingam was falsely charged with an attempt to corrupt a fellow legislator. Although he was found not guilty and acquitted on all charges, Vaithilingam lost leadership of the Congress Legislative party. In 2006, he was for the sixth time elected to the legislature and served as Industries and Power Minister in N. Rangaswamy cabinet.

== Positions held ==
Political offices
Preceded by D. Ramachandran	Chief Minister of Pondicherry; 4 July 1991–13 May 1996	Succeeded by R.V. Janakiraman
Preceded by V.M.C. Ganapathy	Leader of Opposition of Puducherry; 26 May 1996–21 March 2000	Succeeded by R.V. Janakiraman
Preceded by N. Rangaswamy	Chief Minister of Puducherry; 4 September 2008–15 May 2011	Succeeded by N. Rangaswamy
Preceded by A.M.H. Nazeem	Leader of Opposition of Puducherry; 2011–2016	Succeeded by N. Rangaswamy
Preceded by V. Sabapathy	Speaker of Puducherry; 10 June 2016–21 Mar. 2019	Succeeded by V.P. Sivakolundhu
