= 1990 Pondicherry Legislative Assembly election =

Indian union territory election

- 27 February 1990

30 seats in the Puducherry Legislative Assembly 16 seats needed for a majority
- Registered: 585,194
- Turnout: 72.38%
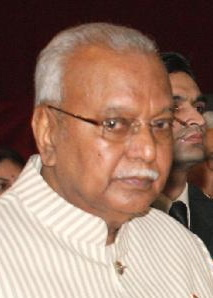

	Majority party	Minority party
Leader	M. O. H. Farook	M. D. R. Ramachandran
Party	INC	DMK
Seats before	15	5
Seats won	11	9
Seat change	▼4	▲4
Popular vote	25.04%	24.07%
CM before election
M. O. H. Farook
INC
Elected CM
M. D. R. Ramachandran
DMK

Elections to the Puducherry Legislative Assembly were held in February 1990, to elect members of the 30 constituencies in Puducherry (then known as Pondicherry), in India. The Indian National Congress won the popular vote, and the most seats, but M. D. R. Ramachandran of the Dravida Munnetra Kazhagam, was appointed as the Chief Minister of Puducherry. His party had an alliance with the CPI, and the Janata Dal.

== Seat allotments ==
=== Congress Alliance ===
No.	Party	Election Symbol	Leader	Seats
1.	Indian National Congress		V. Vaithilingam	17
2.	All India Anna Dravida Munnetra Kazhagam		J. Jayalalithaa	13

=== DMK-led Alliance ===
No.	Party	Election Symbol	Leader	Seats
1.	Dravida Munnetra Kazhagam		M. Karunanidhi	18
2.	Janata Dal		Sivaji Ganesan	7+1 (Note: Friendly Contest on Nettapakkam between DMK and JD.)
3.	Communist Party of India		Indrajit Gupta	3
4.	Communist Party of India (Marxist)		E. M. S. Namboodiripad	2

=== Others ===
Party	Seats contested
Bharatiya Janata Party	8
Indian Congress (Socialist-Sarat Chandra Sinha)	1
Janata Party (JP)	15
Lok Dal (B)	4
Bahujan Samaj Party	9
Ambedkar Makkal Iyakkam	2
Pattali Makkal Katchi	24
Tharasu Makkal Mandram	11
Independents	77

== List of Candidates ==
Constituency		AIADMK+		DMK+	
#	Name	Party	Candidate	Party	Candidate
1	Muthialpet	ADMK	R. Kalipaerumal	DMK	G. Palaniraja
2	Cassicade	INC	P. Kannan	DMK	S. Anandavelu
3	Raj Bhavan	INC	L. Joseph Mariadoss	DMK	S. P. Sivakumar
4	Bussy	INC	C. M. Achraff	DMK	S. Babu Ansardeen
5	Oupalam	ADMK	P. K. Loganathan	DMK	N. Naghamuthu
6	Orleampeth	ADMK	M. Pandurangan	DMK	N. Manimaran
7	Nellithope	ADMK	B. Manimaran	DMK	R. V. Jankiraman
8	Modeliarpeth	INC	V. Kothandaraman	CPI	M. Manjini
9	Ariankuppam	ADMK	G. D. Chandran	JD	A. Bakthkavachalam
10	Embalom (SC)	ADMK	K. Anbalagan	JD	K. Deivanayagam
11	Nettapakkam	INC	V. Vaithilingam	DMK	N. Devadass
11	Nettapakkam	INC	V. Vaithilingam	JD	R. Subbarayakcounder
12	Kuruvinatham	ADMK	P. Purushothaman	DMK	R. Ramanathan
13	Bahour (SC)	INC	M. Rajagopalan	JD	P. Rajavelu
14	Thirubuvanai (SC)	ADMK	D. Viswanathan	DMK	N. Veerappan
15	Mannadipeth	ADMK	R. Somasundaram	DMK	D. Ramachandiran
16	Ossudu (SC)	INC	N. Marimuthu	JD	P. Sundararasu
17	Villenour	INC	P. Ananda Baskaran	DMK	M. Venugopal
18	Ozhukarai	ADMK	M. Padmanabhan	DMK	M. Rasan Vazhumuni
19	Thattanchavady	INC	N. Rangasamy	JD	V. Pethaperumal
20	Reddiarpalayam	INC	V. Balaji	CPI	R. Viswanathan
21	Lawspet	INC	M. O. H. Farook	CPM	P. Sankaran
22	Cotchery	INC	M. Vaithilingam	DMK	R. Nalamagarajan
23	Karaikal	INC	S. M. Thavasu	JD	G. Rangayen
24	Karaikal South	ADMK	S. Ramassamy	DMK	S. Savarirajan
25	Neravy-Grand Aldee	ADMK	V. Ganapathy	DMK	V. M. C. Sivakumar
26	Tirunallar	ADMK	P. Sathiadasan	DMK	A. Soundararengan
27	Neduncadu (SC)	INC	M. Chandirakassu	CPI	P. Thangarasu
28	Mahe	INC	E. Valsaraj	CPM	Mukkath Jayan
29	Palloor	INC	A. V. Sreedharan	JD	P. Sreedharan Nambiar
30	Yanam	INC	Velaga Rajeshwara Rao	DMK	Raksha Harikrishna

== Election Statistics ==
#	Constituency	Electors (Note: Total number of registered voters in the constituency who are eligible to vote.)	Voters (Note: Total number of people who actually cast their vote (includes both valid and invalid votes).)	Poll % (Note: Percentage of registered electors who voted. Poll Percentage equals to (Voters ÷ Electors) × 100)	Valid votes (Note: Valid Votes that were accepted during counting because they were correctly cast. Invalid/rejected votes are excluded. It is calculated using: Valid Votes equals to "Voters − Rejected (Invalid) Votes")
1	Muthialpet	28,508	19,167	67.23%	18,965
2	Cassicade	17,494	11,597	66.29%	11,500
3	Raj Bhavan	8,625	5,354	62.08%	5,313
4	Bussy	9,555	5,634	58.96%	5,573
5	Oupalam	19,918	13,777	69.17%	13,674
6	Orleampeth	25,505	16,103	63.14%	16,003
7	Nellithope	24,612	15,985	64.95%	15,875
8	Modeliarpeth	27,566	19,761	71.69%	19,620
9	Ariankuppam	24,309	17,710	72.85%	17,563
10	Embalom (SC)	16,223	12,812	78.97%	12,634
11	Nettapakkam	17,322	13,391	77.31%	13,250
12	Kuruvinatham	16,477	13,929	84.54%	13,802
13	Bahour (SC)	18,225	14,347	78.72%	14,229
14	Thirubuvanai (SC)	19,795	14,650	74.01%	14,522
15	Mannadipeth	19,331	15,407	79.70%	15,299
16	Ossudu (SC)	16,430	12,969	78.93%	12,857
17	Villenour	20,438	15,685	76.74%	15,546
18	Ozhukarai	21,285	16,290	76.53%	16,178
19	Thattanchavady	27,900	18,645	66.83%	18,522
20	Reddiarpalayam	35,043	22,109	63.09%	21,946
21	Lawspet	33,391	24,049	72.02%	23,842
22	Cotchery	18,212	14,542	79.85%	14,417
23	Karaikal	20,424	13,072	64.00%	12,996
24	Karaikal South	15,662	10,763	68.72%	10,674
25	Neravy-Grand Aldee	17,113	13,849	80.93%	13,732
26	Tirunallar	15,100	11,615	76.92%	11,553
27	Neduncadu (SC)	14,509	11,189	77.12%	11,089
28	Mahe	11,666	9,206	78.91%	9,174
29	Palloor	11,876	9,111	76.72%	9,048
30	Yanam	12,680	10,869	85.72%	10,775
Total		5,85,194	4,23,587	72.38%	4,20,171

=== Trivia ===
A total of 212 candidates contested the election across all 30 constituencies, with an average of 7 candidates per constituency.

The minimum number of candidates in a constituency was 2, in Muthialpet, while the maximum number of candidates was 13, in Raj Bhavan.

Out of the 30 constituencies:

- 2 constituencies had 2–5 candidates.
- 22 constituencies had 6–10 candidates.
- 3 constituencies had 11–15 candidates.
- No constituency had more than 15 candidates.
- There were 5,85,194 registered electors, comprising 3,02,259 men and 2,82,935 women.
- A total of 4,23,587 electors voted, including 2,17,954 men and 2,05,633 women.
- The overall voter turnout was 72.38%. The turnout among men was 72.11%, while the turnout among women was 72.68%.
- A total of 4,20,171 valid votes were recorded.
- 3,416 votes were rejected, accounting for 0.81% of the total votes polled.
- Polling was conducted at 690 polling stations across the territory.
- The average number of electors per polling station was 848.
- A total of 212 candidates contested the election, comprising 206 men and 6 women.
- A total of 30 candidates were elected, all of whom were men. No woman candidate was elected.
- The security deposits of 144 candidates were forfeited, including 138 men and 6 women.

== Results ==
Party	Votes	%	Seats	+/–
Indian National Congress	105,207	25.04	11	▼4
Dravida Munnetra Kazhagam	101,127	24.07	9	▲4
All India Anna Dravida Munnetra Kazhagam	76,337	18.17	3	▼3
Janata Dal	38,145	9.08	4	New
Communist Party of India	21,323	5.07	2	▲2
Others	44,475	10.58	0	0
Independents	33,557	7.99	1	▼1
Total	420,171	100.00	30	0
Valid votes	420,171	99.19		
Invalid/blank votes	3,416	0.81		
Total votes	423,587	100.00		
Registered voters/turnout	585,194	72.38		
Source: ECI

== Elected members ==
Winner, runner-up, voter turnout, and victory margin in every constituency
Assembly Constituency		Turnout	Winner				Runner Up				Margin
#	Names	%	Candidate	Party	Votes	%	Candidate	Party	Votes	%	Margin
1	Muthialpet	67.23	G. Palani Raja	DMK	10,571	55.74	R. Kalipaerumal Alias Perumal	AIADMK	8,394	44.26	2,177
2	Cassicade	66.29	P. Kannan	INC	6,040	52.52	S. Anandavelu	DMK	5,095	44.30	945
3	Raj Bhavan	62.08	S. P. Sivakumar	DMK	2,528	47.58	L. Joseph Mariadoss	INC	2,377	44.74	151
4	Bussy	58.96	C. M. Achraff	INC	2,692	48.30	S. Babu Ansardeen	DMK	2,463	44.20	229
5	Oupalam	69.17	N. Naghamuthu	DMK	7,378	53.96	P. K. Loganathan	AIADMK	5,956	43.56	1,422
6	Orleampeth	63.14	N. Manimaran	DMK	8,076	50.47	M. Pandurangan	AIADMK	7,569	47.30	507
7	Nellithope	64.95	R. V. Janakiraman	DMK	6,601	41.58	B. Manimaran	AIADMK	6,071	38.24	530
8	Mudaliarpet	71.69	M. Manjini	CPI	8,905	45.39	V. Sababady Kothandraman	INC	8,049	41.02	856
9	Ariankuppam	72.85	A. Bakthkavachalam	JD	5,950	33.88	Gopalusamy Alias G. D. Chandran	AIADMK	5,265	29.98	685
10	Embalam	78.97	K. Deivanayagam	JD	4,669	36.96	K. Sivaloganathan	Independent	3,563	28.20	1,106
11	Nettapakkam	77.31	V. Vaithilingam	INC	7,332	55.34	N. Devadass	DMK	3,193	24.10	4,139
12	Kuruvinatham	84.54	R. Ramanathan	DMK	6,072	43.99	P. Purushothaman	AIADMK	4,307	31.21	1,765
13	Bahour	78.72	P. Rajavelu	JD	8,223	57.79	M. Rajagopalan	INC	5,179	36.40	3,044
14	Thirubuvanai	74.01	D. Viswanathan	AIADMK	6,743	46.43	N. Veerappan	DMK	5,219	35.94	1,524
15	Mannadipet	79.70	D. Ramachandran	DMK	7,802	51.00	R. Somasundaram	AIADMK	6,210	40.59	1,592
16	Ossudu	78.93	N. Marimuthu	INC	5,242	40.77	P. Sundararasu	JD	3,514	27.33	1,728
17	Villianur	76.74	P. Anandabaskaran	INC	8,442	54.30	M. Venugopal	DMK	4,706	30.27	3,736
18	Ozhukarai	76.53	M. Rasan Alias Vazhumuni	DMK	8,749	54.08	M. Padmanabhan	AIADMK	6,956	43.00	1,793
19	Thattanchavady	66.83	V. Pethaperumal	JD	9,503	51.31	N. Rangaswamy	INC	8,521	46.00	982
20	Reddiarpalayam	63.09	R. Viswanathan	CPI	11,153	50.82	V. Balaji	INC	8,482	38.65	2,671
21	Lawspet	72.02	M. O. H. Farook	INC	12,637	53.00	P. Sankaran	CPI(M)	9,738	40.84	2,899
22	Cotchery	79.85	M. Vaithilingam	INC	5,189	35.99	G. Panjavarnam	Independent	5,049	35.02	140
23	Karaikal North	64.00	S. M. Thavasu	INC	5,394	41.51	G. Rangayen	JD	3,783	29.11	1,611
24	Karaikal South	68.72	S. Ramassamy	AIADMK	6,012	56.32	S. Savarirajan	DMK	4,228	39.61	1,784
25	Neravy T R Pattinam	80.93	V. Ganapathy	AIADMK	7,102	51.72	V. M. C. Sivakumar	DMK	6,258	45.57	844
26	Thirunallar	76.92	R. Kamalakkannan	Independent	4,124	35.70	A. Soundararengan	DMK	3,698	32.01	426
27	Nedungadu	77.12	M. Chandirakasu	INC	6,174	55.68	R. Kuppusamy	Independent	2,591	23.37	3,583
28	Mahe	78.91	E. Valsaraj	INC	5,142	56.05	Mukkath Jayan	CPI(M)	3,304	36.01	1,838
29	Palloor	76.72	A. V. Sreedharan	INC	5,288	58.44	K. Gangadharan	Independent	2,576	28.47	2,712
30	Yanam	85.72	Raksha Harikrishna	DMK	4,632	42.99	Velaga Rajeshwara Rao	INC	3,027	28.09	1,605

== See also ==
- List of constituencies of the Puducherry Legislative Assembly
- 1990 elections in India
