= 1985 Pondicherry Legislative Assembly election =

Indian union territory election

- 3 May 1985

30 seats in the Puducherry Legislative Assembly 16 seats needed for a majority
- Registered: 388,472
- Turnout: 78.39%
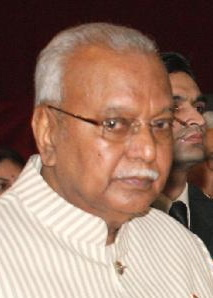

	Majority party	Minority party	Third party
Leader	M. O. H. Farook	M. D. R. Ramachandran	M. G. Ramachandran
Party	INC	DMK	AIADMK
Leader's seat	Lawspet	Mannadipet	Did not contest
Last election	23.92%, 10	27.73, 14	18.6%, 0
Seats before	10	14	0
Seats won	15	6	6
Seat change	▲5	▼9	▲6
Popular vote	98,601	87,754	47,521
Percentage	32.68%	29.08%	15.75%
Swing	▲8.76%	▲1.35%	▼2.85%
Chief Minister before election
President's rule
Elected Chief Minister
M. O. H. Farook
INC

Elections to the Puducherry Legislative Assembly were held in May 1985, to elect members of the 30 constituencies in Puducherry (then known as Pondicherry), in India. The Indian National Congress won the popular vote and the most seats, and M. O. H. Farook was appointed as the Chief Minister of Puducherry.

== Seat allotments ==
=== Congress Alliance ===
No.	Party	Election Symbol	Leader	Seats
1.	Indian National Congress		M. O. H. Farook	20
2.	All India Anna Dravida Munnetra Kazhagam		M. G. Ramachandran	10

=== DMK-led Alliance ===
No.	Party	Election Symbol	Leader	Seats
1.	Dravida Munnetra Kazhagam		M. Karunanidhi	22
2.	Communist Party of India		C. Rajeswara Rao	4
3.	Communist Party of India (Marxist)		E. M. S. Namboodiripad	2
4.	Independent			2

== List of Candidates ==
Constituency		AIADMK+		DMK+	
#	Name	Party	Candidate	Party	Candidate
1	Muthialpet	ADMK	A. Kasilingam	DMK	G. Palaniraja
2	Cassicade	INC	P. Kannan	CPI	Saraswathi Subbiah
3	Raj Bhavan	INC	L. Joseph Mariadoss	DMK	Louis Pragasam Cannaya
4	Bussy	INC	C. M. Achraff	DMK	S. Babu Ansardeen
5	Oupalam	ADMK	P. K. Loganathan	DMK	Sitha. Vedanayagam
6	Orleampeth	ADMK	M. A. S. Subramanian	DMK	Na. Marimuthu
7	Nellithope	ADMK	B. Manimaran	DMK	R. V. Janakiraman
8	Modeliarpeth	INC	V. Sabapathy Kothandaraman	CPI	M. Manjini
9	Ariankuppam	ADMK	P. Purushothaman	DMK	P. Suppurayan
10	Embalom (SC)	ADMK	K. Anbalagan	DMK	K. Siva Loganathan
11	Nettapakkam	INC	V. Vaithilingam	DMK	P. Ramamurthy
12	Kuruvinatham	ADMK	K. Parasuraman	DMK	R. Ramansthan
13	Bahour (SC)	INC	S. Narayanasamy	DMK	P. Murthy
14	Thirubuvanai (SC)	INC	P. Cattavarayane	DMK	S. Komala
15	Mannadipeth	INC	A. Krishnasamy	DMK	D. Ramachandran
16	Ossudu (SC)	INC	V. Nagarathinam	CPI	R. Thangavelu Clemenceau
17	Villenour	INC	R. Subraya Counder	DMK	M. Venugopal
18	Ozhukarai	ADMK	R. Somasundaram	DMK	G. Perumal Raja
19	Thattanchavady	INC	T. Murugesan	DMK	A. V. Shunmugam
20	Reddiarpalayam	INC	V. Balaji	CPI	N. Ranganathan
21	Lawspet	INC	M. O. H. Farook	DMK	S. Muthu
22	Cotchery	INC	N. Vengadasalam	DMK	G. Panjavarnam
23	Karaikal	INC	V. Govindarajan	IND	V. M. Salih Maricar
24	Karaikal South	INC	A. M. Kassim	DMK	R. Arumaikannu
25	Neravy-Grand Aldee	ADMK	V. M. C. Varada Pillai	DMK	V. M. C. Sivakumar
26	Tirunallar	ADMK	N. Ramadass	DMK	R. Kamalakkannan
27	Neduncadu (SC)	INC	M. Chandirakasu	CPM	M. Kaliaperumal
28	Mahe	INC	P. K. Sathyanandan	CPM	K. V. Raghavan
29	Palloor	INC	A. V. Sreedharan	IND	C. P. Pokku Haje
30	Yanam	INC	Kamisetty P. Naidu	DMK	Md. Ahamed Sirajuddin

== Results ==
Party	Votes	%	Seats	+/–
Indian National Congress	98,601	32.68	15	▲5
Dravida Munnetra Kazhagam	87,754	29.08	5	▼9
All India Anna Dravida Munnetra Kazhagam	47,521	15.75	6	▲6
Janata Party	25,966	8.61	2	▼1
Others	22,609	7.49	0	0
Independents	19,273	6.39	2	0
Total	301,724	100.00	30	0
Valid votes	301,724	99.08		
Invalid/blank votes	2,808	0.92		
Total votes	304,532	100.00		
Registered voters/turnout	388,472	78.39		
Source: ECI

== Elected members ==
Winner, runner-up, voter turnout, and victory margin in every constituency
Assembly Constituency		Turnout	Winner				Runner Up				Margin
#k	Names	%	Candidate	Party	Votes	%	Candidate	Party	Votes	%	Margin
1	Muthialpet	76.33%	G. Palani Raja	DMK	7,820	53.93%	A. Kasilingam	AIADMK	6,281	43.32%	1,539
2	Cassicade	68.84%	P. Kannan	INC	5,273	62.76%	Saraswati Subbiah	CPI	1,521	18.10%	3,752
3	Raj Bhavan	65.95%	L. Joseph Mariadoss	INC	2,419	54.77%	Louie Pragassa Kannaiya	DMK	1,578	35.73%	841
4	Bussy	63.57%	C. M. Achraff	INC	2,213	53.17%	S. Babu Ansardeen	DMK	1,516	36.42%	697
5	Oupalam	75.51%	P. K. Loganathan	AIADMK	3,898	38.99%	Sitha Vedanayagam	DMK	3,040	30.41%	858
6	Orleampeth	93.89%	M. A. S. Subramanian	AIADMK	6,635	55.70%	Na. Marimuthu	DMK	5,079	42.64%	1,556
7	Nellithope	71.31%	R. V. Janakiraman	DMK	5,526	51.78%	B. Manimaran	AIADMK	4,490	42.07%	1,036
8	Mudaliarpet	77.39%	V. Sababady Kothandraman	INC	6,260	47.06%	M. Manjini	CPI	5,874	44.16%	386
9	Ariankuppam	81.12%	P. Purushothaman	AIADMK	5,505	43.46%	P. Subbarayan	DMK	5,127	40.47%	378
10	Embalam	80.79%	K. Anbalagan	AIADMK	4,509	51.03%	K. Siva Loganathan	DMK	4,327	48.97%	182
11	Nettapakkam	82.73%	V. Vaithilingam	INC	6,946	72.94%	P. Ramamurthy	DMK	2,577	27.06%	4,369
12	Kuruvinatham	85.84%	R. Ramansthan	DMK	4,207	40.67%	K. Parasuraman	AIADMK	3,361	32.49%	846
13	Bahour	85.20%	P. Uthiravelu	JP	4,911	47.50%	S. Narayanasamy	INC	4,201	40.63%	710
14	Thirubuvanai	78.85%	S. Komala	DMK	5,745	54.39%	P. Cattavarayane	INC	4,751	44.98%	994
15	Mannadipet	86.26%	M. D. R. Ramachandran	DMK	6,383	56.48%	A. Krishnasamy	INC	4,918	43.52%	1,465
16	Ossudu	77.31%	V. Nagarathinam	INC	6,176	69.24%	R. Thangavelu Clemanso	CPI	2,251	25.24%	3,925
17	Villianur	80.15%	R. Subbaraya Gounder	INC	5,696	52.34%	M. Venugopal	DMK	5,187	47.66%	509
18	Ozhukarai	82.87%	R. Somasundaram	AIADMK	5,729	53.78%	G. Perumal Raja	DMK	4,428	41.57%	1,301
19	Thattanchavady	74.96%	V. Pethaperumal	JP	6,228	44.66%	T. Murugesan	INC	3,926	28.16%	2,302
20	Reddiarpalayam	70.04%	V. Balaji	INC	7,852	56.58%	N. Ranganathan	CPI	4,647	33.48%	3,205
21	Lawspet	78.33%	M. O. H. Farook	INC	8,804	60.36%	S. Muthu	DMK	5,157	35.36%	3,647
22	Cotchery	81.94%	N. Vengadasalam	INC	5,774	55.94%	G. Panjavarnam	DMK	4,441	43.02%	1,333
23	Karaikal North	66.51%	V. Govindarajan	INC	4,784	49.54%	V. M. Salih Maricar	Independent	3,671	38.02%	1,113
24	Karaikal South	73.55%	S. Ramassamy	Independent	3,808	46.73%	A. M. Kassim	INC	2,393	29.37%	1,415
25	Neravy T R Pattinam	83.30%	V. M. C. Varada Pillai	AIADMK	5,788	53.46%	V. M. C. Sivakumar	DMK	5,038	46.54%	750
26	Thirunallar	81.77%	A. Sonudararengan	Independent	4,246	45.19%	R. Kamalakkannan	DMK	3,475	36.99%	771
27	Nedungadu	79.40%	M. Chandirakasu	INC	5,870	67.60%	M. Kaliaperumal	CPI(M)	2,674	30.80%	3,196
28	Mahe	82.14%	P. K. Sathyanandan	INC	3,695	53.04%	K. V. Raghavan	CPI(M)	2,719	39.03%	976
29	Palloor	81.57%	A. V. Sreedharan	INC	3,766	54.05%	T. K. Chandrashekaran	JP	1,943	27.88%	1,823
30	Yanam	87.27%	Kamisetty Parasuram Naidu	INC	2,884	41.45%	Raksha Harikrishna	Independent	2,498	35.91%	386

== See also ==
- List of constituencies of the Puducherry Legislative Assembly
- 1985 elections in India
