= Chief Minister of Puducherry =

Leader of the executive branch of the Government of Puducherry

- Putuccēri Mutalamaiccar
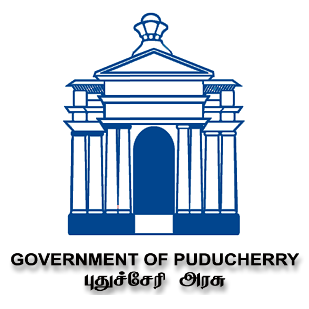
- Emblem of Puducherry

- Flag of India

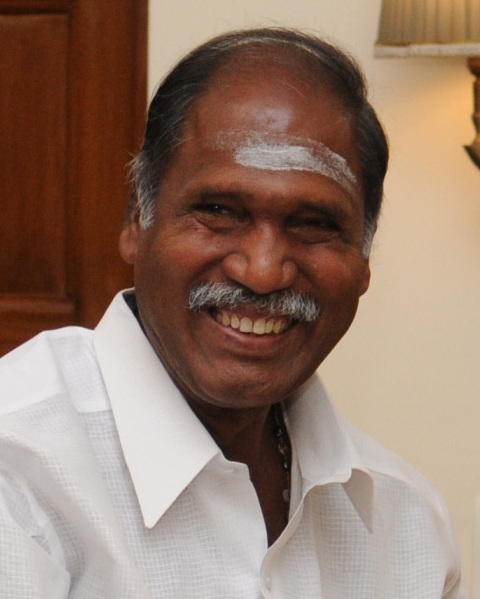
- Incumbent; N. Rangasamy since 7 May 2021
- Style: The Honourable (formal); Mr. Chief Minister (informal)
- Type: Head of government
- Abbreviation: CM
- Member of: Puducherry Legislative Assembly; Puducherry Council of Ministers
- Reports to: Lieutenant Governor of Puducherry; Puducherry Legislative Assembly
- Appointer: President of India
- Formation: 1 July 1963; 63 years ago
- First holder: Edouard Goubert
- Website: py.gov.in

The chief minister of Puducherry is the chief executive of the Indian union territory of Puducherry. In accordance with the Constitution of India, the lieutenant governor is a union territory's de jure head, but de facto executive authority rests with the chief minister. Following elections to the Puducherry Legislative Assembly, the lieutenant governor typically invites the party or coalition that holds a majority of seats to form the government as he is the ceremonial head. The president of India appoints the chief minister, along with their council of ministers, is collectively responsible to the assembly. As long as the chief minister maintains the assembly's confidence, their term lasts for five years and is not subject to any term limits.

Since 1963, Puducherry has had 10 chief ministers. The longest-serving and current chief minister, N. Rangasamy from the All India N.R. Congress (AINRC), held the office for over seventeen years in multiple tenures. M. O. H. Farook and V. Vaithilingam from the Indian National Congress (INC) have the second- and third-longest tenures, respectively. The first holder Edouard Goubert from the INC has the shortest tenure (only 1 year, 71 days). There have been seven instances of president's rule in Puducherry, most recently in 2021, which occurred due to political instability and the inability of the legislative assembly to function effectively.

The current incumbent is N. Rangasamy of the All India N.R. Congress (AINRC) since 7 May 2021.

== Predecessors ==
The French settlements in India were in a transition period between the de facto transfer day (i.e., 1 November 1954) and the de jure transfer day (i.e., 16 August 1962). In January 1955, the government of India, by an order, renamed these four French settlements in India as the State of Pondicherry. Both these transfer days are official holidays within the union territory of Puducherry.

Chief Counselors of Pondicherry
No.	Portrait	Name (Birth–Death)	Term in office		
No.	Portrait	Name (Birth–Death)	Assumed office	Left office	Time in office
1		Maurice Pakkiriswamy Pillai (1906–1956)	17 August 1955	13 January 1956	149 days
2		Edouard Goubert (1894–1979)	17 January 1956	24 October 1958	2 years, 280 days
–	Vacant (25 October 1958 – 8 September 1959)				
3		V. Venkatasubba Reddiar (1909–1982)	9 September 1959	30 June 1963	3 years, 294 days

Enactment of the Government of Union Territories Act

On 10 May 1963, the government of India enacted the Government of Union Territories Act, 1963, which came into force on 1 July 1963. It introduced the same pattern of government that prevailed in the rest of the country but was subject to certain limitations. Under Article 239 of the Indian Constitution, the president of India appoints the lieutenant governor of Puducherry with such designation as he may specify to head the administration of the territory. The president of India appoints the chief minister, along with their council of ministers.

Also, the representative assembly was converted into the legislative assembly of Pondicherry on 1 July 1963 as per Section 54(3) of the Union Territories Act, 1963, and its members were deemed to have been elected to the assembly. Thus, the first legislative assembly was formed without an election. Elections for the assembly have been held since 1964.

== List of Chief Ministers of Puducherry ==
Key

- ^{RES} Resigned
- ^{DIS} Dismissed by the Head of State
- ^{NC} Resigned following a no-confidence motion
- ^{§} Returned to office after a previous non-consecutive term

Chief Ministers of Puducherry
AIADMK (1) AINRC (1) DMK (3) INC (7)
No.	Portrait	Name (Birth–Death)	Elected constituency	Term of office (Note: The ordinal number of the term being served by the person specified in the row in the corresponding period.)			Assembly (Election)	Ministry	Appointer	Political party (Note: This column only names the chief minister's party. The union territory government he heads may be a complex coalition of several parties and independents; these are not listed here.)
No.	Portrait	Name (Birth–Death)	Elected constituency	Assumed office	Left office	Time in office	Assembly (Election)	Ministry	Appointer	Political party
1		Edouard Goubert (1894–1979)	Mannadipet	1 July 1963	10 September 1964	1 year, 71 days	1st (1959)	Goubert	Sarvepalli Radhakrishnan	Indian National Congress
2		V. Venkatasubba Reddiar (1909–1982)	Nettapakkam	11 September 1964	8 April 1967^{[RES]}	2 years, 209 days	2nd (1964)	Reddiar I	Sarvepalli Radhakrishnan	Indian National Congress
3		M. O. H. Farook (1937–2012)	Karaikal North	9 April 1967	5 March 1968^{[RES]}	331 days	2nd (1964)	Farook I	Sarvepalli Radhakrishnan	Indian National Congress
(2)		V. Venkatasubba Reddiar (1909–1982)	Nettapakkam	6 March 1968^{[§]}	18 September 1968^{[RES]}	196 days	2nd (1964)	Reddiar II	Zakir Husain	Indian National Congress
–		Vacant (President's rule)	N/A	18 September 1968	16 March 1969	179 days	Dissolved	N/A	–	N/A
(3)		M. O. H. Farook (1937–2012)	Kalapet	17 March 1969^{[§]}	3 January 1974^{[NC]}	4 years, 292 days	3rd (1969)	Farook II	Zakir Husain	Dravida Munnetra Kazhagam
–		Vacant (President's rule)	N/A	3 January 1974	5 March 1974	61 days	Dissolved	N/A	–	N/A
4		S. Ramassamy (1939–2017)	Karaikal South	6 March 1974	28 March 1974^{[NC]}	22 days	4th (1974)	Ramassamy I	Varahagiri Venkata Giri	All India Anna Dravida Munnetra Kazhagam
–		Vacant (President's rule)	N/A	28 March 1974	1 July 1977	3 years, 95 days	Dissolved	N/A	–	N/A
(4)		S. Ramassamy (1939–2017)	Karaikal South	2 July 1977^{[§]}	12 November 1978^{[DIS]}	1 year, 133 days	5th (1977)	Ramassamy II	B. D. Jatti	All India Anna Dravida Munnetra Kazhagam
–		Vacant (President's rule)	N/A	12 November 1978	15 January 1980	1 year, 64 days	Dissolved	N/A	–	N/A
5		M. D. R. Ramachandran (1934–2024)	Mannadipet	16 January 1980	24 June 1983^{[DIS]}	3 years, 159 days	6th (1980)	Ramachandran I	Neelam Sanjiva Reddy	Dravida Munnetra Kazhagam
–		Vacant (President's rule)	N/A	24 June 1983	16 March 1985	1 year, 265 days	Dissolved	N/A	–	N/A
(3)		M. O. H. Farook (1937–2012)	Lawspet	17 March 1985^{[§]}	7 March 1990	4 years, 355 days	7th (1985)	Farook III	Giani Zail Singh	Indian National Congress
(5)		M. D. R. Ramachandran (1934–2024)	Mannadipet	8 March 1990^{[§]}	4 March 1991^{[NC]}	361 days	8th (1990)	Ramachandran II	R. Venkataraman	Dravida Munnetra Kazhagam
–		Vacant (President's rule)	N/A	4 March 1991	3 July 1991	121 days	Dissolved	N/A	–	N/A
6		V. Vaithilingam (b. 1950)	Nettapakkam	4 July 1991	26 May 1996	4 years, 327 days	9th (1991)	Vaithilingam I	R. Venkataraman	Indian National Congress
7		R. V. Janakiraman (1941–2019)	Nellithope	27 May 1996	21 March 2000^{[NC]}	3 years, 299 days	10th (1996)	Janakiraman	Shankar Dayal Sharma	Dravida Munnetra Kazhagam
8		P. Shanmugam (1927–2013)	Yanam	22 March 2000	23 May 2001	1 year, 218 days	10th (1996)	Shanmugam I	K. R. Narayanan	Indian National Congress
8		P. Shanmugam (1927–2013)	Yanam	24 May 2001	26 October 2001^{[RES]}	1 year, 218 days	11th (2001)	Shanmugam II	K. R. Narayanan	Indian National Congress
9		N. Rangasamy (b. 1950)	Thattanchavady	27 October 2001	17 May 2006	6 years, 312 days	11th (2001)	Rangasamy I	K. R. Narayanan	Indian National Congress
9		N. Rangasamy (b. 1950)	Thattanchavady	18 May 2006	3 September 2008^{[RES]}	6 years, 312 days	12th (2006)	Rangasamy II	A. P. J. Abdul Kalam	Indian National Congress
(6)		V. Vaithilingam (b. 1950)	Nettapakkam	4 September 2008^{[§]}	15 May 2011	2 years, 253 days	12th (2006)	Vaithilingam II	Pratibha Devisingh Patil	Indian National Congress
(9)		N. Rangasamy (b. 1950)	Kadirkamam (Note: He also won the contested seat of Indira Nagar, but he vacated it.)	16 May 2011^{[§]}	5 June 2016	5 years, 20 days	13th (2011)	Rangasamy III	Pratibha Devisingh Patil	All India N.R. Congress
10		V. Narayanasamy (b. 1947)	Nellithope (by- elected) (Note: He did not contest any seat at the time of the election.)	6 June 2016	25 February 2021^{[NC]}	4 years, 264 days	14th (2016)	Narayanasamy	Pranab Mukherjee	Indian National Congress
–		Vacant (President's rule)	N/A	25 February 2021	6 May 2021	70 days	Dissolved	N/A	–	N/A
(9)		N. Rangasamy (b. 1950)	Thattanchavady (Note: He also contested the Yanam Assembly constituency, but he lost from there.)	7 May 2021^{[§]}	12 May 2026	5 years, 176 days	15th (2021)	Rangasamy IV	Ram Nath Kovind	All India N.R. Congress
(9)		N. Rangasamy (b. 1950)	Mangalam (Note: He also won the contested seat of Thattanchavady, but he vacated it.)	13 May 2026	Incumbent	5 years, 176 days	16th (2026)	Rangasamy V	Droupadi Murmu	All India N.R. Congress

Timeline

== Statistics ==
List of chief ministers by length of term

No.	Name	Party	Length of term	
No.	Name	Party	Longest continuous term	Total duration of the chief ministership
1	N. Rangasamy	AINRC/INC	6 years, 312 days	17 years, 143 days
2	M. O. H. Farook	INC/DMK	4 years, 355 days	10 years, 248 days
3	V. Vaithilingam	INC	4 years, 327 days	7 years, 215 days
4	V. Narayanasamy	INC	4 years, 264 days	4 years, 264 days
5	M. D. R. Ramachandran	DMK	3 years, 159 days	4 years, 155 days
6	R. V. Janakiraman	DMK	3 years, 299 days	3 years, 299 days
7	V. Venkatasubba Reddiar	INC	2 years, 209 days	3 years, 40 days
8	S. Ramassamy	AIADMK	1 year, 133 days	1 year, 155 days
9	P. Shanmugam	INC	1 year, 218 days	1 year, 218 days
10	Edouard Goubert	INC	1 year, 71 days	1 year, 71 days

List by party

Parties by total time-span of their member holding CMO (30 October 2026)
No.	Political party	Number of chief ministers	Total days of holding CMO
1	Indian National Congress	7	11306 days
2	Dravida Munnetra Kazhagam	3	4763 days
3	All India N.R. Congress	1	3849 days
4	All India Anna Dravida Munnetra Kazhagam	1	520 days

Parties by total duration (in days) of holding Chief Minister's Office

- INC
- DMK
- AINRC
- AIADMK

== See also ==
- President of India
- History of Puducherry
- Elections in Puducherry
- List of presidents of India
- Puducherry Legislative Assembly
- Lieutenant Governor of Puducherry
- List of current Indian chief ministers
- List of speakers of the Puducherry Legislative Assembly
- List of leaders of the opposition in the Puducherry Legislative Assembly
