= Kuruvinatham Assembly constituency =

Former constituency of the Puducherry Legislative Assembly

Coordinates: 11.80°N 79.73°E

Kuruvinatham
- Former constituency for the Puducherry Legislative Assembly

Constituency details
- Country: India
- Region: South India
- Union Territory: Puducherry
- Established: 1964
- Abolished: 2006

Kuruvinatham was a state assembly constituency in the Indian state of Puducherry. It was in existence from the 1964 to the 2006 state elections.

== Members of the Legislative Assembly ==
Year	Member	Party
1964	K. R. Subramaniya Padayachi	Independent politician
1969	K. R. Subramaniya Padayachi	Indian National Congress
1974	N. Vengadasamy	All India Anna Dravida Munnetra Kazhagam
1977	N. Vengadasamy	All India Anna Dravida Munnetra Kazhagam
1980	M. A. Shanmugam	Dravida Munnetra Kazhagam
1985	R. Ramanathan	Dravida Munnetra Kazhagam
1990	R. Ramanathan	Dravida Munnetra Kazhagam
1991	T. Thiagarajan	Indian National Congress
1996	T. Thiagarajan	Indian National Congress
2001	R. Radhakrishnan	Puducherry Makkal Congress
2006	R. Radhakrishnan	Indian National Congress

== Election results ==
Vote share of winning candidates
2006	74.66%
2001	50.58%
1996	48.85%
1991	51.72%
1990	43.99%
1985	40.67%
1980	42.59%
1977	39.87%
1974	44.50%
1969	56.13%
1964	47.91%

=== Assembly Election 2006 ===
2006 Pondicherry Legislative Assembly election: Kuruvinatham
Party	Candidate	Votes	%	±%
INC	R. Radhakrishnan	13,020	74.66%	36.85%
JD(S)	B. Navaneetha Kannan	3,557	20.40%	
Independent	P. Sivanandam	329	1.89%	
BJP	T. Vikraman	265	1.52%	
DMDK	A. Rajasekaran	156	0.89%	
BSP	S. Subramanian	101	0.58%	
Margin of victory		9,463	54.26%	41.48%
Turnout		17,439	90.10%	6.52%
Registered electors		19,356		2.28%
INC gain from PMC		Swing	24.08%	

=== Assembly Election 2001 ===
2001 Pondicherry Legislative Assembly election: Kuruvinatham
Party	Candidate	Votes	%	±%
PMC	R. Radhakrishnan	8,000	50.58%	
INC	T. Thiagarajan	5,979	37.81%	−11.04%
PMK	T. Vikkiraman	1,308	8.27%	
Independent	G. Rajasegar	233	1.47%	
JP	C. Soolaimani	125	0.79%	
Independent	S. Sundaramoorthy	111	0.70%	
Margin of victory		2,021	12.78%	11.51%
Turnout		15,815	83.57%	3.16%
Registered electors		18,924		7.60%
PMC gain from INC		Swing	-1.14%	

=== Assembly Election 1996 ===
1996 Pondicherry Legislative Assembly election: Kuruvinatham
Party	Candidate	Votes	%	±%
INC	T. Thiagarajan	7,209	48.85%	−2.88%
MDMK	R. Ramanathan	7,022	47.58%	
DMK	A. Annapoorni	305	2.07%	−28.62%
BSP	M. Shanmugam	89	0.60%	
Independent	M. Muthunarayanan	83	0.56%	
Margin of victory		187	1.27%	−19.77%
Turnout		14,758	87.32%	6.91%
Registered electors		17,587		5.82%
INC hold		Swing	-2.88%	

=== Assembly Election 1991 ===
1991 Pondicherry Legislative Assembly election: Kuruvinatham
Party	Candidate	Votes	%	±%
INC	T. Thiagarajan	6,765	51.72%	
DMK	N. Vengadasamy	4,014	30.69%	−13.30%
PMK	P. Venugopal	2,161	16.52%	−7.92%
Margin of victory		2,751	21.03%	8.25%
Turnout		13,079	80.41%	−4.13%
Registered electors		16,619		0.86%
INC gain from DMK		Swing	7.73%	

=== Assembly Election 1990 ===
1990 Pondicherry Legislative Assembly election: Kuruvinatham
Party	Candidate	Votes	%	±%
DMK	R. Ramanathan	6,072	43.99%	3.32%
AIADMK	P. Purushothaman	4,307	31.21%	−1.29%
PMK	C. Subramanian	3,373	24.44%	
Margin of victory		1,765	12.79%	4.61%
Turnout		13,802	84.54%	−1.30%
Registered electors		16,477		35.36%
DMK hold		Swing	3.32%	

=== Assembly Election 1985 ===
1985 Pondicherry Legislative Assembly election: Kuruvinatham
Party	Candidate	Votes	%	±%
DMK	R. Ramansthan	4,207	40.67%	−1.92%
AIADMK	K. Parasuraman	3,361	32.49%	
JP	K. R. Subramaniya Padayachi	2,776	26.84%	
Margin of victory		846	8.18%	−3.36%
Turnout		10,344	85.84%	−2.68%
Registered electors		12,173		16.25%
DMK hold		Swing	-1.92%	

=== Assembly Election 1980 ===
1980 Pondicherry Legislative Assembly election: Kuruvinatham
Party	Candidate	Votes	%	±%
DMK	M. A. Shanmugam	3,738	42.59%	32.34%
JP	K. R. Subramaniya Padayachi	2,725	31.05%	
Independent	N. Venkatasamy	2,313	26.36%	
Margin of victory		1,013	11.54%	6.56%
Turnout		8,776	88.52%	6.11%
Registered electors		10,471		1.39%
DMK gain from AIADMK		Swing	2.72%	

=== Assembly Election 1977 ===
1977 Pondicherry Legislative Assembly election: Kuruvinatham
Party	Candidate	Votes	%	±%
AIADMK	N. Vengadasamy	3,359	39.87%	−4.63%
JP	K. R. Subramaniya Padayachi	2,939	34.89%	
INC	S. Jegadeesan	1,262	14.98%	
DMK	V. Dhamodaran	864	10.26%	−11.11%
Margin of victory		420	4.99%	−5.39%
Turnout		8,424	82.42%	−6.63%
Registered electors		10,327		14.92%
AIADMK hold		Swing	-4.63%	

=== Assembly Election 1974 ===
1974 Pondicherry Legislative Assembly election: Kuruvinatham
Party	Candidate	Votes	%	±%
AIADMK	N. Vengadasamy	3,445	44.50%	
INC(O)	K. R. Subramaniya Padayachi	2,642	34.13%	
DMK	V. Dhamodaran	1,654	21.37%	
Margin of victory		803	10.37%	−5.52%
Turnout		7,741	89.05%	2.97%
Registered electors		8,986		5.37%
AIADMK gain from INC		Swing	-11.63%	

=== Assembly Election 1969 ===
1969 Pondicherry Legislative Assembly election: Kuruvinatham
Party	Candidate	Votes	%	±%
INC	K. R. Subramaniya Padayachi	4,050	56.13%	29.51%
CPI	M. Rajagopal	2,903	40.24%	
Independent	A. Deivasigamani	262	3.63%	
Margin of victory		1,147	15.90%	−5.39%
Turnout		7,215	86.08%	−1.79%
Registered electors		8,528		11.80%
INC gain from Independent		Swing	8.23%	

=== Assembly Election 1964 ===
1964 Pondicherry Legislative Assembly election: Kuruvinatham
Party	Candidate	Votes	%	±%
Independent	K. R. Subramaniya Padayachi	3,167	47.91%	
INC	R. L. Purushothaman	1,760	26.62%	
Independent	R. Ramachandran	1,625	24.58%	
IPF	S. Ramalingam	59	0.89%	
Margin of victory		1,407	21.28%	
Turnout		6,611	87.87%	
Registered electors		7,628		
Independent win (new seat)				
