= 1991 Pondicherry Legislative Assembly election =

Indian union territory election

- 15 June 1991

30 seats in the Puducherry Legislative Assembly 16 seats needed for a majority
- Registered: 593,318
- Turnout: 67.73%
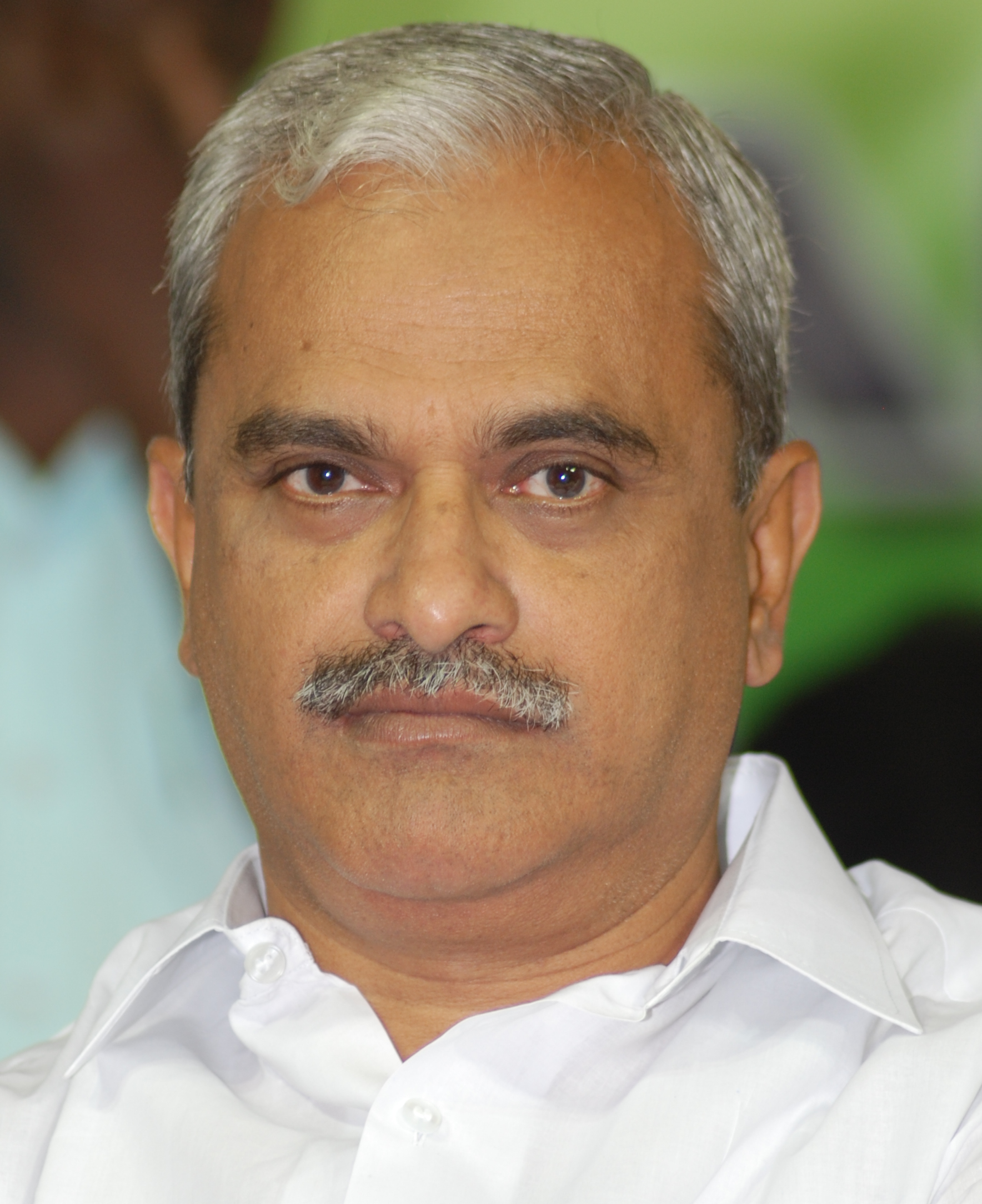

	Majority party	Minority party
Leader	V. Vaithilingam
Party	INC	DMK
Seats before	11	9
Seats won	15	4
Seat change	▲4	▼5
Popular vote	32.29%	24.71%
CM before election
President's rule
Elected CM
V. Vaithilingam
INC

Elections to the Puducherry Legislative Assembly were held in June 1991, to elect members of the 30 constituencies in Puducherry (then known as Pondicherry), in India. The Indian National Congress won the popular vote and the most seats, and V. Vaithilingam was appointed as the Chief Minister of Puducherry. The Indian National Congress was in an alliance with the AIADMK.

== Seat allotments ==
=== Congress Alliance ===
No.	Party	Election Symbol	Leader	Seats
1.	Indian National Congress		V. Vaithilingam	19
2.	All India Anna Dravida Munnetra Kazhagam		J. Jayalalithaa	10
3.	Independent		P. Rajavelu (In Bagoor constituency)	1

=== DMK-led Alliance ===
No.	Party	Election Symbol	Leader	Seats
1.	Dravida Munnetra Kazhagam		M. Karunanidhi	19
2.	Janata Dal		Sivaji Ganesan	6
3.	Communist Party of India		Indrajit Gupta	3
4.	Communist Party of India (Marxist)		Harkishan Singh Surjeet	2

== List of Candidates ==
Constituency		AIADMK+		DMK+	
#	Name (Note: SC indicate constituencies reserved for Scheduled Castes.)	Party	Candidate	Party	Candidate
1	Muthialpet	ADMK	M. Balasubramaniam	DMK	S. Anandavedlu
2	Cassicade	INC	P. Shanmugan	JD	M. Elango
3	Raj Bhavan	INC	A. Gandhiraj	DMK	S. P. Sivakumar
4	Bussy	INC	C. M. K. Achraff	DMK	G. Perularaja
5	Oupalam	ADMK	U. C. Arumugan	DMK	N. Nathamuthu
6	Orleampeth	ADMK	K. Parasuraman	DMK	N. Manimaran
7	Nellithope	ADMK	N. R. Shanmugam	DMK	R. V. Janakiraman
8	Modeliarpeth	INC	V. Bhalan	CPI	M. Manjini
9	Ariankuppam	ADMK	V. Kalivaradhan	DMK	P. Subburayan
10	Embalom (SC)	INC	K. Pakkiri Ammal	JD	R. Rajaraman
11	Nettapakkam	INC	V. Vaithilingam	DMK	R. Subbaraya Counder
12	Kuruvinatham	INC	T. Thiagarajan	DMK	N. Vengadasamy
13	Bahour (SC)	IND	P. Rajavelu	CPI	A. Ramamurthy
14	Thirubuvanai (SC)	ADMK	D. Viswanathan	DMK	M. Thangavelu
15	Mannadipeth	INC	N. Rajaram	DMK	D. Ramachandran
16	Ossudu (SC)	INC	N. Marimuthu	JD	S. Balaraman
17	Villenour	INC	P. Anandabaskaran	JD	C. Jayakumar
18	Ozhukarai	ADMK	K. Natarajan	DMK	M. Rasan Alias Vazhumuni
19	Thattanchavady	INC	N. Rangasamy	JD	V. Pethaperumal
20	Reddiarpalayam	ADMK	Indira Munusamy	CPI	R. Viswanathan
21	Lawspet	INC	P. Kanann	CPI(M)	P. Sankaran
22	Cotchery	INC	M. Vaithilingam	DMK	G. Panjavarnam
23	Karaikal	ADMK	M. Gnanadesigan	DMK	A. M. H. Nazeem
24	Karaikal South	INC	A. V. Subramanian	DMK	S. Savarirajan
25	Neravy-Grand Aldee	ADMK	V. M. C. V. Ganapathy	DMK	V. M. C. Sivakoumar
26	Tirunallar	INC	S. P. Selvashanmugham	DMK	A. Soundararengan
27	Neduncadu (SC)	INC	M. Chandirakasu	DMK	S. A. Marimuthu
28	Mahe	INC	E. Valsaraj	CPI(M)	K. V. Raghavan
29	Palloor	INC	A. V. Sreedharan	JD	K. M. Raju Master
30	Yanam	INC	Velaga Rajeswara Rao	DMK	Raksha Hart Krishna

== Results ==
Party	Votes	%	Seats	+/–
Indian National Congress	117,289	30.00	15	▲4
Dravida Munnetra Kazhagam	96,607	24.71	4	▼5
All India Anna Dravida Munnetra Kazhagam	67,792	17.34	6	▲3
Janata Dal	26,321	6.73	1	▼3
Communist Party of India	19,503	4.99	1	▼1
Others	27,678	7.08	0	0
Independents	35,739	9.14	3	▲2
Total	390,929	100.00	30	0
Valid votes	390,929	97.29		
Invalid/blank votes	10,895	2.71		
Total votes	401,824	100.00		
Registered voters/turnout	593,318	67.72		
Source: ECI

== Elected members ==
Constituency		Winner				Runner-up				Margin	
#	Name	Candidate	Party	Votes	%	Candidate	Party	Votes	%	Votes	%
1	Muthialpet	M. Balasubramaniam	ADMK	9,175	52.38	S. Anandavedlu	DMK	8,060	46.02	1,115	6.36
2	Cassicade	M. Elango	JD	4,927	49.97	P. Shanmugan	INC	4,478	45.42	449	4.55
3	Raj Bhavan	A. Gandhiraj	INC	2,381	48.45	S. P. Sivakumar	DMK	2,332	47.46	49	0.99
4	Bussy	C. M. K. Achraff	INC	3,083	58.80	G. Perularaja	DMK	2,042	38.95	1,041	19.85
5	Oupalam	U. C. Arumugan	ADMK	7,352	57.27	N. Nathamuthu	DMK	5,283	41.15	2,069	16.12
6	Orleampeth	K. Parasuraman	ADMK	8,697	59.44	N. Manimaran	DMK	5,613	38.36	3,084	21.08
7	Nellithope	R. V. Janakiraman	DMK	7,067	49.05	N. R. Shanmugam	ADMK	6,988	48.50	79	0.55
8	Modeliarpeth	V. Kothandaraman	IND	8,230	45.45	M. Manjini	CPI	4,295	23.72	3,935	21.73
9	Ariankuppam	P. Subburayan	DMK	5,794	35.59	S. Ramsing	PMK	4,624	28.40	1,170	7.19
10	Embalom (SC)	K. Pakkiri Ammal	INC	4,171	37.57	R. Rajaraman	JD	2,587	23.30	1,584	14.27
11	Nettapakkam	V. Vaithilingam	INC	8,095	66.14	R. Subbaraya Counder	DMK	3,782	30.90	4,313	35.24
12	Kuruvinatham	T. Thiagarajan	INC	6,765	51.72	N. Vengadasamy	DMK	4,014	30.69	2,751	21.03
13	Bahour (SC)	P. Rajavelu	IND	6,377	48.63	E. Rajalingam	IND	4,454	33.96	1,923	14.67
14	Thirubuvanai (SC)	D. Viswanathan	ADMK	7,453	55.69	M. Thangavelu	DMK	4,939	36.90	2,514	18.79
15	Mannadipet	N. Rajaram	INC	7,771	52.33	D. Ramachandran	DMK	6,874	46.29	897	6.04
16	Ossudu (SC)	N. Marimuthu	INC	7,293	63.00	S. Balaraman	JD	4,162	35.95	3,131	27.05
17	Villenour	P. Anandabaskaran	INC	8,190	54.09	C. Jayakumar	JD	6,740	44.51	1,450	9.58
18	Ozhukarai	K. Natarajan	ADMK	8,566	56.82	M. Rasan	DMK	6,279	41.65	2,287	15.17
19	Thattanchavady	N. Rangasamy	INC	12,545	69.71	V. Pethaperumal	JD	5,285	29.37	7,260	40.34
20	Reddiarpalayam	R. Viswanathan	CPI	13,134	64.00	Indira Munusamy	ADMK	6,517	31.76	6,617	32.24
21	Lawspet	P. Kanann	INC	13,475	61.51	P. Sankaran	CPI(M)	8,088	36.92	5,387	24.59
22	Cotchery	R. Nalamaharajan	IND	5,051	37.01	M. Vaithilingam	INC	4,592	33.64	459	3.37
23	Karaikal	A. M. H. Nazeem	DMK	6,809	59.31	M. Gnanadesigan	ADMK	4,389	38.23	2,420	21.08
24	Karaikal South	A. V. Subramanian	INC	6,189	61.10	S. Savarirajan	DMK	3,724	36.76	2,465	24.34
25	Neravy-Grand Aldee	V. M. C. V. Ganapathy	ADMK	6,384	49.67	V. M. C. Sivakoumar	DMK	6,145	47.81	239	1.86
26	Tirunallar	A. Soundararengan	DMK	4,401	41.37	R. Kamalakkannan	IND	2,994	28.14	1,407	13.23
27	Neduncadu (SC)	M. Chandirakasu	INC	5,955	55.25	S. A. Marimuthu	DMK	4,824	44.75	1,131	10.50
28	Mahe	E. Valsaraj	INC	5,099	62.62	K. V. Raghavan	CPI(M)	2,421	29.73	2,678	32.89
29	Palloor	A. V. Sreedharan	INC	4,922	59.02	K. M. Raju Master	JD	2,620	31.41	2,302	27.61
30	Yanam	Velaga Rajeswara Rao	INC	6,331	56.87	Raksha Hart Krishna	DMK	4,704	42.26	1,627	14.61

== See also ==
- List of constituencies of the Puducherry Legislative Assembly
- 1991 elections in India
