= Cassicade Assembly constituency =

Former constituency of the Puducherry Legislative Assembly

Coordinates: 11.938°N 79.828°E

Cassicade
- Former constituency for the State Legislative Assembly

Constituency details
- Country: India
- State: Puducherry
- Established: 1964
- Abolished: 2006

Cassicade was a state assembly constituency in the Indian state of Puducherry. It was in existence from the 1964 to the 2006 state elections.

== Members of the Legislative Assembly ==
Year	Member	Party
1964	A. S. Kankeyan	Indian National Congress
1969	Ansari P. Duraisamy	Indian National Congress
1974	Ansari P. Duraisamy	Indian National Congress
1977	Ansari P. Duraisamy	Janata Party
1980	V. Kathirvelu	Indian National Congress
1985	P. Kannan	Indian National Congress
1990	P. Kannan	Indian National Congress
1991	M. Elango	Janata Dal
1996	P. Kannan	Independent politician
2001	K. Lakshminarayanan	Puducherry Munnetra Congress
2006	K. Lakshminarayanan	Puducherry Munnetra Congress

== Election results ==
Vote share of winning candidates
2006	49.05%
2001	51.52%
1996	63.21%
1991	49.97%
1990	52.52%
1985	62.76%
1980	51.63%
1977	47.01%
1974	38.91%
1969	60.33%
1964	39.98%

=== Assembly Election 2006 ===
2006 Pondicherry Legislative Assembly election: Cassicade
Party	Candidate	Votes	%	±%
PMC	K. Lakshminarayanan	4,942	49.05%	
INC	G. Ravichandiran	4,726	46.90%	
BJP	D. Deenadhayalan	210	2.08%	
DMDK	V. Govindan	169	1.68%	
Margin of victory		216	2.14%	−16.65%
Turnout		10,076	77.76%	9.33%
Registered electors		12,957		−6.35%
PMC hold		Swing	-2.47%	

=== Assembly Election 2001 ===
2001 Pondicherry Legislative Assembly election: Cassicade
Party	Candidate	Votes	%	±%
PMC	K. Lakshminarayanan	4,875	51.52%	
PMK	R. Malar Mannan	3,097	32.73%	
TMC(M)	V. Balaji	1,360	14.37%	
Independent	Murali . D.	130	1.37%	
Margin of victory		1,778	18.79%	−13.35%
Turnout		9,462	68.44%	11.21%
Registered electors		13,835		−13.35%
PMC gain from Independent		Swing	1.55%	

=== Assembly Election 1996 ===
1996 Pondicherry Legislative Assembly election: Cassicade
Party	Candidate	Votes	%	±%
Independent	P. Kannan	6,501	63.21%	
INC	S. Narayanasamy	3,195	31.06%	−14.36%
BJP	S. Thiagarajan	304	2.96%	0.49%
AIIC(T)	Panneerselvam	125	1.22%	
JP	Devatha Oupendran	49	0.48%	
Margin of victory		3,306	32.14%	27.59%
Turnout		10,285	66.08%	8.86%
Registered electors		15,966		−10.11%
Independent gain from JD		Swing	13.23%	

=== Assembly Election 1991 ===
1991 Pondicherry Legislative Assembly election: Cassicade
Party	Candidate	Votes	%	±%
JD	M. Elango	4,927	49.97%	
INC	P. Shanmugan	4,478	45.42%	−7.10%
BJP	Balavengatraman	243	2.46%	0.62%
Independent	Mahavir Jain	85	0.86%	
Margin of victory		449	4.55%	−3.66%
Turnout		9,859	57.22%	−9.07%
Registered electors		17,761		1.53%
JD gain from INC		Swing	-2.55%	

=== Assembly Election 1990 ===
1990 Pondicherry Legislative Assembly election: Cassicade
Party	Candidate	Votes	%	±%
INC	P. Kannan	6,040	52.52%	−10.24%
DMK	S. Anandavelu	5,095	44.30%	
BJP	L. Balavengatraman	212	1.84%	
PMK	G. Alamelu	127	1.10%	
Margin of victory		945	8.22%	−36.44%
Turnout		11,500	66.29%	−2.55%
Registered electors		17,494		42.09%
INC hold		Swing	-10.24%	

=== Assembly Election 1985 ===
1985 Pondicherry Legislative Assembly election: Cassicade
Party	Candidate	Votes	%	±%
INC	P. Kannan	5,273	62.76%	
CPI	Saraswati Subbiah	1,521	18.10%	
JP	G. Sambath	1,090	12.97%	
IC(S)	S. Sukumaran	518	6.17%	
Margin of victory		3,752	44.66%	15.47%
Turnout		8,402	68.84%	−4.07%
Registered electors		12,312		12.41%
INC gain from INC(I)		Swing	11.13%	

=== Assembly Election 1980 ===
1980 Pondicherry Legislative Assembly election: Cassicade
Party	Candidate	Votes	%	±%
INC(I)	V. Kathirvelu	3,948	51.63%	
JP	Ansari P. Duraisamy	1,716	22.44%	
INC(U)	S. Sugumaran	849	11.10%	
Independent	S. Krishnaraj	531	6.94%	
Independent	Munisamy (Durai)	273	3.57%	
Independent	L. Ramalingam	112	1.46%	
Independent	U. Mahabal Kumar	107	1.40%	
Independent	D. Expo Ramanathan	47	0.61%	
Margin of victory		2,232	29.19%	17.40%
Turnout		7,647	72.91%	7.14%
Registered electors		10,953		−5.60%
INC(I) gain from JP		Swing	4.61%	

=== Assembly Election 1977 ===
1977 Pondicherry Legislative Assembly election: Cassicade
Party	Candidate	Votes	%	±%
JP	Ansari P. Duraisamy	3,551	47.01%	
AIADMK	N. Arumughom	2,661	35.23%	1.58%
INC	Ponnurangam S.	1,341	17.75%	
Margin of victory		890	11.78%	6.52%
Turnout		7,553	65.77%	−12.84%
Registered electors		11,603		15.66%
JP gain from INC(O)		Swing	8.10%	

=== Assembly Election 1974 ===
1974 Pondicherry Legislative Assembly election: Cassicade
Party	Candidate	Votes	%	±%
INC(O)	Ansari P. Duraisamy	2,996	38.91%	
AIADMK	Durai Munisami	2,591	33.65%	
DMK	Anandavelu	1,936	25.15%	
Independent	Sivaprakam. N.	78	1.01%	
Independent	Varadarajulu Alias Varadhan. P.	51	0.66%	
Independent	Subramanian. N. Alias Ramu	47	0.61%	
Margin of victory		405	5.26%	−23.83%
Turnout		7,699	78.61%	9.13%
Registered electors		10,032		51.11%
INC(O) gain from INC		Swing	-21.42%	

=== Assembly Election 1969 ===
1969 Pondicherry Legislative Assembly election: Cassicade
Party	Candidate	Votes	%	±%
INC	Ansari P. Duraisamy	2,721	60.33%	20.35%
CPI	R. Azhwar	1,409	31.24%	
Independent	Thillai Kanagaraj	380	8.43%	
Margin of victory		1,312	29.09%	15.38%
Turnout		4,510	69.48%	−1.57%
Registered electors		6,639		3.15%
INC hold		Swing	20.35%	

=== Assembly Election 1964 ===
1964 Pondicherry Legislative Assembly election: Cassicade
Party	Candidate	Votes	%	±%
INC	A. S. Kankeyan	1,799	39.98%	
Independent	Kuppusamy Mudaliar	1,182	26.27%	
IPF	Saraswati	880	19.56%	
Independent	Sivaprakasam	572	12.71%	
Independent	Siyali Venku Chetty	67	1.49%	
Margin of victory		617	13.71%	
Turnout		4,500	71.05%	
Registered electors		6,436		
INC win (new seat)				
