= Reddiarpalayam Assembly constituency =

Former constituency of the Puducherry Legislative Assembly

Coordinates: 11.930°N 79.799°E

Reddiarpalayam
- Former constituency for the Puducherry Legislative Assembly

Constituency details
- Country: India
- Region: South India
- Union Territory: Puducherry
- Established: 1974
- Abolished: 2006
- Total electors: 44,540
- Reservation: None

Reddiarpalayam was a state assembly constituency in the Indian state of Puducherry. It existed from the 1974 state election until the 2006 state election.

== Members of Legislative Assembly ==
Year	Winner	Party
1974	V. Subbiah	Communist Party of India
1977	V. Subbiah	Communist Party of India
1980	Renuka Appadurai	Indian National Congress
1985	V. Balaji	Indian National Congress
1990	R. Viswanathan	Communist Party of India
1991	R. Viswanathan	Communist Party of India
1996	R. Viswanathan	Communist Party of India
2001	A. M. Krishnamurthy	Bharatiya Janata Party
2006	R. Viswanathan	Communist Party of India

== Election results ==
Vote share of winning candidates
2001	44.85%
1996	65.58%
1991	64.00%
1990	50.82%
1985	56.58%
1980	52.49%
1977	35.35%
1974	44.09%

=== Assembly Election 2006 ===
2006 Pondicherry Legislative Assembly election: Reddiarpalayam
Party	Candidate	Votes	%	±%
CPI	R. Viswanathan	17,314	50.43%	19.15%
AIADMK	A. M. Krishnamurthy	13,925	40.56%	
DMDK	R. B. Ashokbabu	1,748	5.09%	
BJP	M. Elangovan	750	2.18%	−42.66%
Independent	Governor Shanmugam	191	0.56%	
Independent	B. Renuga	170	0.50%	
Margin of victory		3,389	9.87%	−3.69%
Turnout		34,330	77.08%	6.96%
Registered electors		44,540		22.27%
CPI gain from BJP		Swing	5.59%	

=== Assembly Election 2001 ===
2001 Pondicherry Legislative Assembly election: Reddiarpalayam
Party	Candidate	Votes	%	±%
BJP	A. M. Krishnamurthy	11,446	44.85%	39.92%
CPI	R. Viswanathan	7,985	31.29%	−34.30%
PMK	N. G. Pannirselvam	5,573	21.84%	
Independent	M. Rapheal	210	0.82%	
LJP	V. Sundaramoorthy	125	0.49%	
Margin of victory		3,461	13.56%	−29.28%
Turnout		25,522	70.12%	12.26%
Registered electors		36,429		−15.78%
BJP gain from CPI		Swing	-19.15%	

=== Assembly Election 1996 ===
1996 Pondicherry Legislative Assembly election: Reddiarpalayam
Party	Candidate	Votes	%	±%
CPI	R. Viswanathan	17,206	65.58%	1.58%
AIADMK	Na, Manimaran	5,966	22.74%	−9.02%
BJP	A. M. Krishnamurthy	1,294	4.93%	2.64%
MGRK	N. T. Sampathkumar	1,028	3.92%	
AIIC(T)	K. Venkatachalam	326	1.24%	
JP	D. Umasudan	231	0.88%	
Margin of victory		11,240	42.84%	10.60%
Turnout		26,235	62.82%	4.97%
Registered electors		43,254		17.87%
CPI hold		Swing	1.58%	

=== Assembly Election 1991 ===
1991 Pondicherry Legislative Assembly election: Reddiarpalayam
Party	Candidate	Votes	%	±%
CPI	R. Viswanathan	13,134	64.00%	13.18%
AIADMK	Indira Munusamy	6,517	31.76%	
BJP	M. Krishnamurthy	470	2.29%	0.80%
PMK	G. Ramamurthy	316	1.54%	−4.02%
Margin of victory		6,617	32.24%	20.07%
Turnout		20,522	57.85%	−5.24%
Registered electors		36,695		4.71%
CPI hold		Swing	13.18%	

=== Assembly Election 1990 ===
1990 Pondicherry Legislative Assembly election: Reddiarpalayam
Party	Candidate	Votes	%	±%
CPI	R. Viswanathan	11,153	50.82%	17.34%
INC	V. Balaji	8,482	38.65%	−17.93%
PMK	G. Ramamurthy	1,221	5.56%	
BJP	M. Krishnamurthy	326	1.49%	
Independent	N. Madurai	276	1.26%	
Independent	D. Purushothaman	241	1.10%	
Margin of victory		2,671	12.17%	−10.92%
Turnout		21,946	63.09%	−6.95%
Registered electors		35,043		75.36%
CPI gain from INC		Swing	-5.76%	

=== Assembly Election 1985 ===
1985 Pondicherry Legislative Assembly election: Reddiarpalayam
Party	Candidate	Votes	%	±%
INC	V. Balaji	7,852	56.58%	
CPI	N. Ranganathan	4,647	33.48%	9.07%
JP	P. Kannayan	1,379	9.94%	
Margin of victory		3,205	23.09%	−4.98%
Turnout		13,878	70.04%	−6.50%
Registered electors		19,983		43.00%
INC gain from INC(I)		Swing	4.09%	

=== Assembly Election 1980 ===
1980 Pondicherry Legislative Assembly election: Reddiarpalayam
Party	Candidate	Votes	%	±%
INC(I)	Renuka Appadurai	5,409	52.49%	
CPI	N. Gurusamy	2,516	24.42%	−10.93%
JP	R. Vengatachala Gounder	2,142	20.79%	
JP(S)	P. Durai	238	2.31%	
Margin of victory		2,893	28.07%	26.97%
Turnout		10,305	76.53%	9.31%
Registered electors		13,974		18.47%
INC(I) gain from CPI		Swing	17.14%	

=== Assembly Election 1977 ===
1977 Pondicherry Legislative Assembly election: Reddiarpalayam
Party	Candidate	Votes	%	±%
CPI	V. Subbiah	2,775	35.35%	−8.75%
JP	R. Vengatachala Gounder	2,688	34.24%	
AIADMK	P. K. Lognathan Velu	1,977	25.18%	
DMK	C. S. Jayalatchumi	343	4.37%	−13.62%
Independent	G. Manivannan	68	0.87%	
Margin of victory		87	1.11%	−5.07%
Turnout		7,851	67.22%	−15.19%
Registered electors		11,795		22.93%
CPI hold		Swing	-8.75%	

=== Assembly Election 1974 ===
1974 Pondicherry Legislative Assembly election: Reddiarpalayam
Party	Candidate	Votes	%	±%
CPI	V. Subbiah	3,345	44.09%	
INC(O)	V. Balaji	2,876	37.91%	
DMK	G. Perumal Raja	1,365	17.99%	
Margin of victory		469	6.18%	
Turnout		7,586	82.42%	
Registered electors		9,595		
CPI win (new seat)				
