= Cotchery Assembly constituency =

Former constituency of the Puducherry Legislative Assembly

Coordinates: 10.961°N 79.828°E

Cotchery
- Former constituency for the State Legislative Assembly

Constituency details
- Country: India
- State: Puducherry
- Established: 1964
- Abolished: 2006

Cotchery was a state assembly constituency in the Indian state of Puducherry. It was in existence from the 1964 to the 2006 state elections.

== Members of the Legislative Assembly ==
Year	Member	Party
1964	G. Nagarajan	Indian National Congress
1969	M. Balaya	Indian National Congress
1974	T. Subbaiya	All India Anna Dravida Munnetra Kazhagam
1977	T. Subbaiya	All India Anna Dravida Munnetra Kazhagam
1980	G. Panjavarnam	Dravida Munnetra Kazhagam
1985	N. Vengadasalam	Indian National Congress
1990	M. Vaithilingam	Indian National Congress
1991	R. Nalamaharajan	Independent politician
1996	R. Nalamagarajan	Indian National Congress
2001	R. Nalamagarajan	Indian National Congress
2006	V. Omalingam	All India Anna Dravida Munnetra Kazhagam

== Election results ==
Vote share of winning candidates
2006	50.25%
2001	43.50%
1996	47.53%
1991	37.01%
1990	35.99%
1985	55.94%
1980	49.93%
1977	37.84%
1974	46.04%
1969	47.41%
1964	70.34%

=== Assembly Election 2006 ===
2006 Pondicherry Legislative Assembly election: Cotchery
Party	Candidate	Votes	%	±%
AIADMK	V. Omalingam	10,116	50.25%	
INC	P. R. N. Thirumurugan	9,094	45.17%	1.67%
BJP	S. Elangovan	409	2.03%	−17.77%
Independent	S. Palanivelu	105	0.52%	
Independent	D. N. Suresh	99	0.49%	
DMDK	K. Senthil Velan	90	0.45%	
Margin of victory		1,022	5.08%	−5.25%
Turnout		20,133	87.29%	16.19%
Registered electors		23,065		0.99%
AIADMK gain from INC		Swing	6.75%	

=== Assembly Election 2001 ===
2001 Pondicherry Legislative Assembly election: Cotchery
Party	Candidate	Votes	%	±%
INC	R. Nalamagarajan	7,058	43.50%	−4.03%
PMK	M. Ramadass	5,382	33.17%	
BJP	S. Elangovan	3,212	19.80%	
LJP	S. Rajamani	183	1.13%	
Independent	K. Rajaguru	171	1.05%	
Independent	S. Kalyaperumal	112	0.69%	
Independent	K. Karunagaran	107	0.66%	
Margin of victory		1,676	10.33%	−0.02%
Turnout		16,225	71.10%	−5.09%
Registered electors		22,838		8.98%
INC hold		Swing	6.49%	

=== Assembly Election 1996 ===
1996 Pondicherry Legislative Assembly election: Cotchery
Party	Candidate	Votes	%	±%
INC	R. Nalamagarajan	7,630	47.53%	13.88%
Independent	G. Panjavarnam	5,968	37.17%	
DMK	S. Shanmugam	2,319	14.44%	−14.28%
Margin of victory		1,662	10.35%	6.99%
Turnout		16,054	78.37%	2.18%
Registered electors		20,957		13.18%
INC gain from Independent		Swing	10.52%	

=== Assembly Election 1991 ===
1991 Pondicherry Legislative Assembly election: Cotchery
Party	Candidate	Votes	%	±%
Independent	R. Nalamaharajan	5,051	37.01%	
INC	M. Vaithilingam	4,592	33.64%	−2.35%
DMK	G. Panjavarnam	3,921	28.73%	1.97%
JP	S. Dhismass	85	0.62%	
Margin of victory		459	3.36%	2.39%
Turnout		13,649	76.19%	−3.65%
Registered electors		18,517		1.67%
Independent gain from INC		Swing	1.01%	

=== Assembly Election 1990 ===
1990 Pondicherry Legislative Assembly election: Cotchery
Party	Candidate	Votes	%	±%
INC	M. Vaithilingam	5,189	35.99%	−19.95%
Independent	G. Panjavarnam	5,049	35.02%	
DMK	R. Nalamagarajan	3,858	26.76%	−16.26%
PMK	I. Panneerselvam	222	1.54%	
Margin of victory		140	0.97%	−11.94%
Turnout		14,417	79.85%	−2.09%
Registered electors		18,212		43.16%
INC hold		Swing	-19.95%	

=== Assembly Election 1985 ===
1985 Pondicherry Legislative Assembly election: Cotchery
Party	Candidate	Votes	%	±%
INC	N. Vengadasalam	5,774	55.94%	
DMK	G. Panjavarnam	4,441	43.02%	−6.90%
Independent	M. Jeanne D'Arc Marie	107	1.04%	
Margin of victory		1,333	12.91%	−6.76%
Turnout		10,322	81.94%	−2.68%
Registered electors		12,721		22.12%
INC gain from DMK		Swing	6.01%	

=== Assembly Election 1980 ===
1980 Pondicherry Legislative Assembly election: Cotchery
Party	Candidate	Votes	%	±%
DMK	G. Panjavarnam	4,133	49.93%	35.92%
Independent	T. Subbaiya	2,504	30.25%	
AIADMK	S. Krishnavelu	1,536	18.56%	−19.28%
Independent	F. Arockiasamy	105	1.27%	
Margin of victory		1,629	19.68%	2.67%
Turnout		8,278	84.62%	4.97%
Registered electors		10,417		1.92%
DMK gain from AIADMK		Swing	12.09%	

=== Assembly Election 1977 ===
1977 Pondicherry Legislative Assembly election: Cotchery
Party	Candidate	Votes	%	±%
AIADMK	T. Subbaiya	3,041	37.84%	−8.21%
Independent	G. Panjavarnam	1,674	20.83%	
JP	E. Rethinacadivelu	1,167	14.52%	
DMK	R. Nalamagarajan	1,126	14.01%	−9.18%
CPI	N. G. Rajan	1,029	12.80%	
Margin of victory		1,367	17.01%	1.74%
Turnout		8,037	79.65%	−10.54%
Registered electors		10,221		12.70%
AIADMK hold		Swing	-8.21%	

=== Assembly Election 1974 ===
1974 Pondicherry Legislative Assembly election: Cotchery
Party	Candidate	Votes	%	±%
AIADMK	T. Subbaiya	3,660	46.04%	
INC(O)	S. M. Jambulingam	2,446	30.77%	
DMK	R. Thirumeny	1,843	23.19%	−15.79%
Margin of victory		1,214	15.27%	6.84%
Turnout		7,949	90.19%	6.84%
Registered electors		9,069		13.76%
AIADMK gain from INC		Swing	-1.36%	

=== Assembly Election 1969 ===
1969 Pondicherry Legislative Assembly election: Cotchery
Party	Candidate	Votes	%	±%
INC	M. Balaya	3,097	47.41%	−22.93%
DMK	T. Jayaraman	2,546	38.97%	
Independent	G. Nagarajan	784	12.00%	
Independent	S. Appadurai	106	1.62%	
Margin of victory		551	8.43%	−35.58%
Turnout		6,533	83.34%	−0.35%
Registered electors		7,972		6.91%
INC hold		Swing	-22.93%	

=== Assembly Election 1964 ===
1964 Pondicherry Legislative Assembly election: Cotchery
Party	Candidate	Votes	%	±%
INC	G. Nagarajan	4,313	70.34%	
Independent	S. Sokalingame	1,614	26.32%	
Independent	V. Govindan	117	1.91%	
Independent	Kathaperumal Alias S. Kathan	88	1.44%	
Margin of victory		2,699	44.02%	
Turnout		6,132	83.69%	
Registered electors		7,457		
INC win (new seat)				
