= 1974 Pondicherry Legislative Assembly election =

Indian union territory election

- 24 February 1974

30 seats in the Puducherry Legislative Assembly 16 seats needed for a majority
- Registered: 264,103
- Turnout: 85.32%

	Majority party	Minority party
Leader	S. Ramassamy
Party	AIADMK	INC(R)
Seats before	New	10
Seats won	12	7
Seat change	NA	▼3
CM before election
President's Rule
Elected CM
S. Ramassamy
AIADMK

Elections to the Puducherry Legislative Assembly were held in February 1974, to elect members of the 30 constituencies in Puducherry (then known as Pondicherry), in India. The All India Anna Dravida Munnetra Kazhagam won the most seats, and its leader, S. Ramassamy was appointed as the Chief Minister of Puducherry (French: Ministre en chef de Pondichéry).

== Results ==
Party	Votes	%	Seats	+/–
All India Anna Dravida Munnetra Kazhagam	60,812	27.83	12	New
Dravida Munnetra Kazhagam	47,823	21.89	2	▼13
Indian National Congress (Organisation)	41,348	18.92	5	New
Indian National Congress	34,840	15.95	7	▼3
Communist Party of India	18,468	8.45	2	▼1
Communist Party of India (Marxist)	2,737	1.25	1	▲1
Independents	12,470	5.71	1	▲1
Total	218,498	100.00	30	0
Valid votes	218,498	96.97		
Invalid/blank votes	6,830	3.03		
Total votes	225,328	100.00		
Registered voters/turnout	264,103	85.32		
Source: ECI

== Elected members ==
Winner, runner-up, voter turnout, and victory margin in every constituency
Assembly Constituency		Turnout	Winner				Runner Up				Margin
#k	Names	%	Candidate	Party	Votes	%	Candidate	Party	Votes	%	Margin
1	Muthialpet	82.21%	G. Pajaniraja	AIADMK	4,315	43.87%	M. Thangapragasam	INC(O)	3,842	39.06%	473
2	Cassicade	78.61%	Ansari P. Duraisamy	INC(O)	2,996	38.91%	Durai Munisami	AIADMK	2,591	33.65%	405
3	Raj Bhavan	74.16%	Dhana Kantharaj	INC	2,399	56.00%	K. Jothi	AIADMK	1,104	25.77%	1,295
4	Bussy	75.48%	S. Pakkiam	AIADMK	1,680	38.59%	A. Jayaraj	INC(O)	1,441	33.10%	239
5	Oupalam	82.49%	C. N. Parthasarathy	AIADMK	3,198	46.84%	P. Raghava Chettiar	INC(O)	2,112	30.93%	1,086
6	Orleampeth	80.22%	N. Manimaran	AIADMK	3,833	48.45%	R. Vaidyanathan	INC	2,356	29.78%	1,477
7	Nellithope	80.84%	R. Kannan	INC(O)	2,495	37.77%	N. Ranganathan	CPI	2,369	35.86%	126
8	Mudaliarpet	87.12%	Sabapathy Alias V. Kothandaraman	INC(O)	3,889	43.06%	R. Alwar	CPI	3,328	36.85%	561
9	Ariankuppam	86.16%	P. C. Purushothaman	INC	3,364	37.06%	P. Subbarayan	DMK	3,017	33.24%	347
10	Embalam	87.38%	G. Murugesan	INC	3,140	47.13%	Sivaloganathan	DMK	1,994	29.93%	1,146
11	Nettapakkam	92.00%	V. Vengatasubba Reddi	INC	4,072	55.65%	S. Vengatachalapathi	AIADMK	2,598	35.51%	1,474
12	Kuruvinatham	89.05%	N. Vengadasamy	AIADMK	3,445	44.50%	K. R. Subramaniya Padayachi	INC(O)	2,642	34.13%	803
13	Bahour	88.37%	Thangavel Clamanso	CPI	2,727	38.77%	P. Utharavelu	Independent	2,211	31.43%	516
14	Thirubuvanai	87.20%	A. Gopal	INC	2,672	34.96%	Thangavelu	AIADMK	2,637	34.50%	35
15	Mannadipet	91.88%	D. Ramachandira Reddiar	AIADMK	3,467	46.00%	Kannappan	INC(O)	2,132	28.29%	1,335
16	Ossudu	86.58%	T. Ezhumalai	AIADMK	3,426	47.83%	V. Nagarathinam	INC	2,461	34.36%	965
17	Villianur	87.65%	M. K. Jeevarathina Odayar	INC(O)	2,812	37.00%	K. Thirukamu	AIADMK	2,606	34.28%	206
18	Ozhukarai	87.15%	Venugopal Alias G. Mannathan	AIADMK	2,982	39.44%	S. Muthu	DMK	2,278	30.13%	704
19	Thattanchavady	83.73%	V. Pethaperumal	INC(O)	3,468	46.85%	N. Gurusamy	CPI	2,710	36.61%	758
20	Reddiarpalayam	82.42%	V. Subbiah	CPI	3,345	44.09%	V. Balaji	INC(O)	2,876	37.91%	469
21	Lawspet	88.12%	M. O. H. Farook	DMK	3,461	39.21%	N. Varazhau	AIADMK	3,275	37.10%	186
22	Cotchery	90.19%	T. Subbaiya	AIADMK	3,660	46.04%	S. M. Jambulingam	INC(O)	2,446	30.77%	1,214
23	Karaikal North	80.49%	K. Kandhi	AIADMK	3,964	41.24%	P. Shanmugam	INC	3,666	38.14%	298
24	Karaikal South	84.85%	S. Ramassamy	AIADMK	3,296	46.80%	S. Savarirajan	INC(O)	1,857	26.37%	1,439
25	Neravy T R Pattinam	86.71%	V. M. C. Varada Pillai	AIADMK	5,313	59.89%	V. M. C. Siva Shanmuganathan	DMK	2,992	33.73%	2,321
26	Thirunallar	89.29%	A. Soundararengan	DMK	3,742	49.31%	S. Arangasamy	INC(O)	2,711	35.72%	1,031
27	Nedungadu	87.59%	R. Coupousamy	INC	2,934	41.18%	P. Selvaraj	AIADMK	2,225	31.23%	709
28	Mahe	85.02%	Kunnummal Raghavan	CPI(M)	1,816	33.03%	Iraye Kunnathitathil Kumaran	Independent	1,528	27.79%	288
29	Palloor	86.10%	Vanmeri Nadeyi Purushothaman	INC	1,980	41.41%	Mottamal Pocku	Independent	1,081	22.61%	899
30	Yanam	90.28%	Kamisetty Parasuram Naidu	Independent	2,284	52.74%	Naidou Maddimsetty Satyamurty	INC	1,986	45.86%	298

== See also ==
- List of constituencies of the Puducherry Legislative Assembly
- 1974 elections in India
