= 1977 Pondicherry Legislative Assembly election =

Indian union territory election

- 6 October 1977

30 seats in the Puducherry Legislative Assembly 16 seats needed for a majority
- Registered: 307,208
- Turnout: 76.21%
	Majority party	Minority party
		JP
Leader	S. Ramassamy
Party	AIADMK	JP
Seats before	12	New
Seats won	14	7
Seat change	▲2	New
Popular vote	30.16%	25.77%
CM before election
President's Rule
Elected CM
S. Ramassamy
AIADMK

Elections to the Puducherry Legislative Assembly were held in October 1977, to elect members of the 30 constituencies in Puducherry (then known as Pondicherry), in India. The All India Anna Dravida Munnetra Kazhagam won the popular vote and the most seats, and S. Ramassamy was appointed as the Chief Minister of Puducherry for his second term.

== List of Candidates ==
Constituency		AIADMK		INC+CPI		JP		DMK	
#	Name	Party	Candidate	Party	Candidate	Party	Candidate	Party	Candidate
1	Muthialpet	ADMK	G. Palani Raja	INC	A. Balasubramanian	JP	M. Velayudham	DMK	K. Murugaian
2	Cassicade	ADMK	Arumughom N.	INC	Ponnurangam S.	JP	Ansari Duraisamy		
3	Raj Bhavan	ADMK	Sadagopan S.	INC	Dana Kanthraj	JP	Ramajayam D.	DMK	Durai Subramanian
4	Bussy	ADMK	Susairaj S.	INC	Achraff C. M.	JP	Masthan N.	DMK	Narayanan J.
5	Oupalam	ADMK	C. N. Pathasarathy	CPI	Manjini M.	JP	Munisamy D.	DMK	Sitha Vedanayagam
6	Orleampeth	ADMK	Manimaram Marimuthu	CPI	N. Ranganathan	JP	S. Ramalingam	DMK	D. Bavani
7	Nellithope	ADMK	P. Vengatesan	CPI	Saraswathy Subbayya	JP	R. Kannan	DMK	D. Ariraman
8	Modeliarpeth	ADMK	A. Radharishanan	INC	V. Sababady Kothandraman	JP	Jeyaselan Padmanabhan	DMK	S. Muthu
9	Ariankuppam	ADMK	M. Pandurangan	INC	G. Dharmalingam	JP	A. Bakthavachalam	DMK	P. Subbarayan
10	Embalom (SC)	ADMK	Sivaloganathan K.	INC	Murugesan G.	JP	Ayyanar N. K.	DMK	Thangarasu G.
11	Nettapakkam	ADMK	Veerappan M. R.	INC	Srvaprakasam S.	JP	Subbaraya Goundar R.	DMK	Ramabadra Reddiar D.
12	Kuruvinatham	ADMK	N. Vengadasamy	INC	S. Jegadeesan	JP	K. R. Subramani Padayachi	DMK	V. Dhamodaran
13	Bahour (SC)	ADMK	A. Thulukkanam	CPI	R. Thangavelu Clemanso	JP	P. Uthiravelu	DMK	P. Ariakrishnan
14	Thirubuvanai (SC)	ADMK	Maniyam M.	INC	Munian K.	JP	Pichaikaran G.	DMK	Kalvarayan M.
15	Mannadipeth	ADMK	Ramachandran D.	INC	Rajaram P.	JP	Rajaram Reddiar N.	DMK	Selvarasu S.
16	Ossudu (SC)	ADMK	Thangavelu M.	INC	Nagarathinam V.	JP	Sivaparakasam R.	DMK	Veerammal Vanamayil M.
17	Villenour	ADMK	Pazhaninathan S.	INC	Devadass N.	JP	Varadarassu P.	DMK	Shanmugam M. A.
18	Ozhukarai	ADMK	G. Venugopal	CPI	N. Gurusamy	JP	P. Devaraj B. D. S.	DMK	G. Perumal Raja
19	Thattanchavady	ADMK	N. Jayaraman	CPI	V. Narayanasamy	JP	V. Pethaperumal	DMK	M. C. Thanagavelan
20	Reddiarpalayam	ADMK	P. K. Lognathan Velu	CPI	V. Subbiah	JP	R. Venkatachala Koundar	DMK	C. S. Jayalatchumi
21	Lawspet	ADMK	N. Varadhan	INC	M. K. Jeevarathina Odayar	JP	S. Ramalingam	DMK	P. Deivanayagam
22	Cotchery	ADMK	T. Subbiah	CPI	N. G. Rajan	JP	E. Rethinacadivelu	DMK	R. Nalamagarajan
23	Karaikal	ADMK	M. Y. Md. Ali Marraicar	INC	M. Govindarasu	JP	S. Ameerudeen	DMK	R. Rajayyan
24	Karaikal South	ADMK	S. Ramassamy	INC	A. Mariakulandai	JP	S. Savarirajan	DMK	N. Ramasamy
25	Neravy-Grand Aldee	ADMK	Somasundaram	INC	G. Jayabalan	JP	V. M. C. Varadhapillai	DMK	V. M. C. Srivakumar
26	Tirunallar	ADMK	A. Soundarangan	INC	P. Shanmugam	JP	S. Aragasamy	DMK	N. V. Ramalingam
27	Neduncadu (SC)	ADMK	P. Selvaraj	INC	R. Kuppusamy	JP	A. Munisamy	DMK	M. Packirisamy
28	Mahe			INC	Raman P. K.				
29	Palloor			INC	V. N. Purushothaman				
30	Yanam			INC	Abdul Khadar Jeelani Md.	JP	Kamisetty Parasuram Naidu		

== Results ==
Party	Votes	%	Seats	+/–
All India Anna Dravida Munnetra Kazhagam	69,873	30.16	14	▲2
Janata Party	59,705	25.77	7	New
Indian National Congress	39,343	16.98	2	▼5
Dravida Munnetra Kazhagam	30,441	13.14	3	▲1
Communist Party of India	18,468	7.97	1	▼1
Independents	13,872	5.99	3	▲2
Total	231,702	100.00	30	0
Valid votes	231,702	98.97		
Invalid/blank votes	2,407	1.03		
Total votes	234,109	100.00		
Registered voters/turnout	307,208	76.21		
Source: ECI

== Elected members ==
Constituency		Winner				Runner Up				Margin	%
#	Name	Candidate	Party	Votes	%	Candidate	Party	Votes	%	Margin	%
1	Muthialpet	G. Palani Raja	ADMK	4,170	42.69	M. Velayudham	JP	2,713	27.77	1,457	14.92
2	Cassicade	Ansari Duraisamy	JP	3,551	47.01	N. Arumughom	ADMK	2,661	35.23	890	11.78
3	Raj Bhavan	D. Ramajayam	JP	1,411	35.31	Dana Kanthraj	INC	1,397	34.96	14	0.35
4	Bussy	S. Susairaj	ADMK	1,289	31.87	C. M. Achraff	INC	1,162	28.73	127	3.14
5	Oupalam	C. N. Pathasarathy	ADMK	2,551	36.69	D. Munisamy	JP	2,304	33.14	247	3.55
6	Orleampeth	N. Manimaram Marimuthu	ADMK	3,779	44.54	S. Ramalingam	JP	1,800	21.22	1,979	23.32
7	Nellithope	R. Kannan	JP	2,757	38.20	P. Vengatesan	ADMK	2,137	29.61	620	8.59
8	Modeliarpeth	V. Sababady Kothandraman	INC	3,947	41.68	A. Radharishanan	ADMK	2,243	23.69	1,704	17.99
9	Ariankuppam	P. Subbarayan	DMK	3,345	34.86	G. Dharmalingam	INC	2,583	26.92	762	7.94
10	Embalom (SC)	K. Sivaloganathan	ADMK	2,442	36.55	G. Murugesan	INC	2,200	32.92	242	3.63
11	Nettapakkam	S. Srvaprakasam	INC	3,122	41.73	R. Subbaraya Goundar	JP	2,915	38.97	207	2.76
12	Kuruvinatham	N. Vengadasamy	ADMK	3,359	39.87	K. R. Subramani Padayachi	JP	2,939	34.89	420	4.98
13	Bahour (SC)	P. Uthiravelu	JP	3,399	45.56	A. Thulukkanam	ADMK	2,346	31.44	1,053	14.12
14	Thirubuvanai (SC)	M. Maniyam	ADMK	3,226	44.42	G. Pichaikaran	JP	1,413	19.45	1,813	24.97
15	Mannadipeth	D. Ramachandran	ADMK	3,824	44.53	N. Rajaram Reddiar	JP	2,096	24.41	1,728	20.12
16	Ossudu (SC)	M. Thangavelu	ADMK	2,902	41.96	V. Nagarathinam	INC	1,640	23.71	1,262	18.25
17	Villenour	S. Pazhaninathan	ADMK	2,891	35.00	P. Varadarassu	JP	2,728	33.03	163	1.97
18	Ozhukarai	G. Perumal Raja	DMK	2,477	31.68	G. Venugopal	ADMK	2,216	28.34	261	3.34
19	Thattanchavady	V. Pethaperumal	JP	4,669	54.46	V. Narayanasamy	CPI	2,005	23.39	2,664	31.07
20	Reddiarpalayam	V. Subbiah	CPI	2,775	35.35	R. Venkatachala Koundar	JP	2,688	34.24	87	1.11
21	Lawspet	N. Varadhan	ADMK	4,477	47.73	M. K. Jeevarathina Odayar	INC	2,530	26.97	1,947	20.76
22	Cotchery	T. Subbiah	ADMK	3,041	37.84	G. Panjavarnam	IND	1,674	20.83	1,367	17.01
23	Karaikal North	K. Kandhi	IND	3,995	42.84	S. Ameerudeen	JP	2,040	21.87	1,955	20.97
24	Karaikal South	S. Ramassamy	ADMK	3,424	47.36	S. Savarirajan	JP	2,698	37.32	726	10.04
25	Neravy-Grand Aldee	V. M. C. Varadhapillai	JP	3,314	36.71	V. M. C. Srivakumar	DMK	3,134	34.71	180	2.00
26	Tirunallar	N. V. Ramalingam	DMK	2,654	34.06	A. Soundarangan	ADMK	2,376	30.49	278	3.57
27	Neduncadu (SC)	P. Selvaraj	ADMK	2,789	39.15	R. Kuppusamy	INC	2,688	37.73	101	1.42
28	Mahe	K. V. Raghavan	IND	2,847	48.58	P. K. Raman	INC	2,835	48.38	12	0.20
29	Palloor	T. K. Chandrasekran	IND	2,853	54.21	V. N. Purushothaman	INC	2,297	43.64	556	10.57
30	Yanam	Kamisetty Naidu	JP	2,047	48.07	Abdul Khader Jeelani Md.	INC	1,981	46.52	66	1.55

== See also ==
- List of constituencies of the Puducherry Legislative Assembly
- 1977 elections in India
