= 2006 Pondicherry Legislative Assembly election =

Indian union territory election

- 8 May 2006

All 30 seats to the Puducherry Legislative Assembly 16 seats needed for a majority
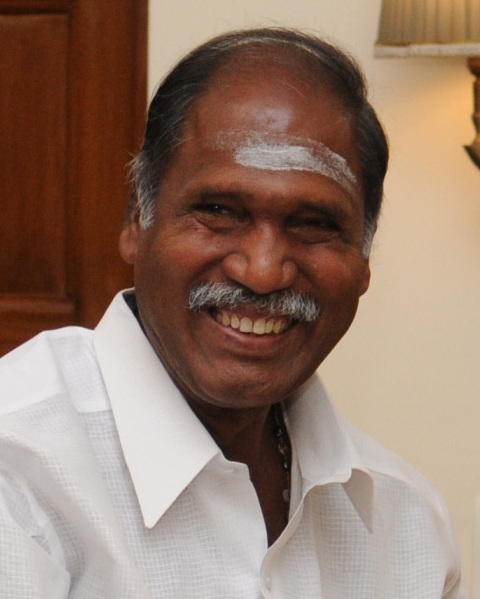

	First party	Second party
Leader	N. Rangaswamy	A. M. H. Nazeem
Party	INC	DMK
Leader's seat	Thattanchavady	Karaikal North
Seats before	11	7
Seats won	10	7
Seat change	▼1	Steady
Chief Minister before election
N. Rangaswamy
INC
Elected Chief Minister
N. Rangaswamy
INC

Elections to the Legislative Assembly of the Indian Union Territory of Pondicherry took place in May 2006 to constitute the Twelfth Assembly of Pondicherry. The UPA alliance comprising Congress, Dravida Munnetra Kazhagam, Pattali Makkal Katchi and Communist Party of India has won and N. Rangasamy of Congress got elected as chief minister.

== Parties and alliances ==
=== Secular Progressive Alliance+United Progressive Alliance ===
Party		Symbol	Leader	Contesting Seats
Indian National Congress	INC		N. Rangasamy	16
Dravida Munnetra Kazhagam	DMK		A. M. H. Nazeem	11
Pattali Makkal Katchi	PMK			2
Communist Party of India	CPI			1

=== All India Anna DMK-led Alliance ===
Party		Symbol	Leader	Contesting Seats
All India Anna Dravida Munnetra Kazhagam	AIADMK		A. Anbazhagan	18
Puducherry Munnetra Congress	PMC		P. Kannan	9
Marumalarchi Dravida Munnetra Kazhagam	MDMK			2+1
Janata Dal (Secular)	JD(S)		H. D. Deve Gowda	1

== List of Candidates ==
List Of Candidates
Constituency		UPA		AIADMK+	
No.	Name	Party	Candidate	Party	Candidate
1	Muthialpet	DMK	Nandha T. Saravanan	AIADMK	A. Kasilingam
2	Cassicade	INC	G. Ravichandiran	PMC	K. Lakshminarayanan
3	Raj Bhavan	DMK	S.P. Sivakumar	PMC	P.K. Devadoss
4	Bussy	DMK	Annibal Kennedy	PMC	Anand
5	Oupalam	DMK	U.C. Arumugam	AIADMK	A. Anbalagan
6	Orleampeth	DMK	R. Siva	AIADMK	S. Anandharaj
7	Nellithope	DMK	R.V. Janakiraman	AIADMK	Om Sakthi Sekar
8	Modeliarpeth	DMK	Dr. M.A.S. Subramanian	PMC	P. Kannan
9	Ariankuppam	PMK	R.K.R. Anantharaman	PMC	T. Djeamourthy
10	Embalom (SC)	DMK	R. Rajaraman	AIADMK	Su. Pavanan
11	Nettapakkam	INC	V. Vaithilingam	PMC	V. Muthunarayanan
12	Kuruvinatham	INC	R. Radhakrishnan	JD(S)	B. Navaneetha Kannan
13	Bahour (SC)	INC	M. Kandasamy	PMC	P. Rajavelu
14	Thirubuvanai (SC)	INC	Angalane	MDMK	Komala S.
15	Mannadipet	PMK	P. Arulmurugan	AIADMK	Venkateswaran @ Baskaran
16	Ossudu (SC)	DMK	T. Mathivanan	AIADMK	S. Arasi
17	Villenour	INC	C. Djeacoumar	PMC	C. Ramadassou
18	Ozhukarai	INC	A. Namassivayam	AIADMK	K. Natarajan
19	Thattanchavady	INC	N. Rangasamy	AIADMK	T. Gunasekaran
20	Reddiarpalayam	CPI	R. Viswanathan	AIADMK	A.M. Krishnamurthy
21	Lawspet	INC	M.O.H.F. Shahjahan	AIADMK	G. Anandhamurugesan
22	Cotchery	INC	P.R.N. Thirumurugan	AIADMK	Omalingam V.
23	Karaikal	DMK	A.M.H. Nazeem	AIADMK	S. Selvaganapathi
24	Karaikal South	INC	A.V. Subramanian	PMC	V.K. Ganapathy
25	Neravy-Grand Aldee	DMK	V.M.C. Sivakkumar	AIADMK	V. Jayabal
26	Tirunallar	INC	Kamalakkannan R.	MDMK	P.R. Siva
27	Neduncadu (SC)	INC	M. Chandirakasu	AIADMK	R. Vaithinathan
27	Neduncadu (SC)	INC	M. Chandirakasu	MDMK	K.M. Kaliyaperumal
28	Mahe	INC	E. Valsaraj	AIADMK	Vijayan
29	Palloor	INC	A.V. Sreedharan	AIADMK	Sadgamayil K. Lakshmanan
30	Yanam	INC	Malladi Krishna Rao	AIADMK	Manchala Satya Sai Kumar

== Results ==
Parties	Seats
Indian National Congress	10
Dravida Munnetra Kazhagam	7
All India Anna Dravida Munnetra Kazhagam	3
Pattali Makkal Katchi	2
Puducherry Munnetra Congress	3
Marumalarchi Dravida Munnetra Kazhagam	1
Communist Party of India	1
Independents	3

== Elected members ==
Constituency		Winner				Runner-up				Margin	
Constituency		Candidate	Party	Votes	%	Candidate	Party	Votes	%	Votes	%
1	Muthialpet	Nandha T. Saravanan	DMK	11,658	58.54	A. Kasilingam	AIADMK	6,779	34.04	4,879	24.50
2	Cassicade	K. Lakshminarayanan	PMC	4,942	49.05	G. Ravichandiran	INC	4,726	46.90	216	2.14
3	Raj Bhavan	S. P. Sivakumar	DMK	2,590	66.07	P. K. Devadoss	PMC	1,094	27.91	1,496	38.16
4	Bussy	Anand	PMC	2,423	54.12	Annibal Kennedy	DMK	1,952	43.60	471	10.52
5	Oupalam	Anbalagan, A.	AIADMK	9,200	58.07	U. C. Arumugam	DMK	6,131	38.70	3,069	19.37
6	Orleampeth	R. Siva	DMK	8,509	52.67	G. Nehru @ Kuppusamy	IND	6,549	40.54	1,960	12.13
7	Nellithope	Om Sakthi Sekar @ S. Sekar	AIADMK	9,933	51.69	R. V. Janakiraman	DMK	8,490	44.18	1,443	7.51
8	Modeliarpeth	Dr. M. A. S. Subramanian	DMK	10,783	37.26	P. Kannan	PMC	9,379	32.41	1,404	4.85
9	Ariankuppam	R. K. R. Anantharaman	PMK	13,314	51.47	T. Djeamourthy	PMC	11,512	44.50	1,802	6.97
10	Embalom (SC)	R. Rajaraman	DMK	7,208	40.57	L. Periyasamy	IND	6,683	37.62	525	2.96
11	Nettapakkam	V. Vaithilingam	INC	9,166	52.24	V. Muthunarayanan	PMC	7,830	44.63	1,336	7.61
12	Kuruvinatham	R. Radhakrishnan	INC	13,020	74.71	B. Navaneetha Kannan	JD(S)	3,557	20.41	9,463	54.30
13	Bahour (SC)	M. Kandasamy	INC	11,164	60.11	P. Rajavelu	PMC	6,888	37.09	4,276	23.02
14	Thirubuvana (SC)	Angalane	INC	10,534	49.91	Komala S.	MDMK	6,378	30.22	4,156	19.69
15	Mannadipeth	P. Arulmurugan	PMK	8,193	42.43	N. Rajaram	IND	6,386	33.07	1,807	9.36
16	Ossudu (SC)	A. Elumalai	IND	6,417	34.58	P. Soundiraradjou Ponnas	IND	3,755	20.24	2,662	14.35
17	Villenour	J. Narayanasamy	IND	11,950	49.38	C. Djeacoumar	INC	10,441	43.14	1,509	6.24
18	Ozhukarai	A. Namassivayam	INC	14,072	48.14	K. Natarajan	AIADMK	12,824	43.87	1,248	4.27
19	Thattanchavady	N. Rangasamy	INC	27,024	90.23	T. Gunasekaran	AIADMK	2,026	6.76	24,998	83.47
20	Reddiarpalayam	R. Viswanathan	CPI	17,314	50.43	A. M. Krishnamurthy	AIADMK	13,925	40.56	3,389	9.87
21	Lawspet	M. O. H. F. Shahjahan	INC	17,944	43.06	G. Anandhamurugesan	AIADMK	10,986	26.37	6,958	16.70
22	Cotchery	Omalingam V.	AIADMK	10,116	50.25	P. R. N. Thirumurugan	INC	9,094	45.17	1,022	5.08
23	Karaikal	A. M. H. Nazeem	DMK	5,742	45.20	A. J. Assana	DMDK	5,551	43.70	191	1.50
24	Karaikal South	V. K. Ganapathy	PMC	7,970	55.06	A. V. Subramanian	INC	6,231	43.05	1,739	12.01
25	Neravy-Grand Aldee	V. M. C. Sivakkumar	DMK	4,946	31.41	V. M. C. V. Ganapathy	IND	4,762	30.24	184	1.17
26	Tirunallar	P. R. Siva	MDMK	7,237	49.69	Kamalakkannan R.	INC	6,952	47.73	285	1.96
27	Neduncadu (SC)	A. Marimuthu	IND	6,143	43.47	Chandirakasu M.	INC	5,306	37.54	837	5.92
28	Mahe	E. Valsaraj	INC	5,647	55.76	Adv. T. Ashok Kumar	CPI(M)	3,700	36.54	1,947	19.23
29	Palloor	A. V. Sreedharan	INC	5,987	53.37	T. K. Gangadharan	CPI(M)	4,512	40.22	1,475	13.15
30	Yanam	Malladi Krishna Rao	INC	11,763	64.93	Rakshaharikrishna	IND	5,457	30.12	6,306	34.81

== See also ==
- Government of Puducherry
- Puducherry Legislative Assembly
- Pondicherry Representative Assembly
- List of chief ministers of Puducherry
- List of speakers of the Puducherry Legislative Assembly
- List of lieutenant governors of Puducherry
- 2011 Puducherry Legislative Assembly election
