= V. M. C. Sivakumar =

Indian politician

V.M.C. Sivakumar was the former agriculture minister and speaker of the union territory of Puducherry. His family had dominated the constituency of Neravy T.R.Pattinam for decades by winning about 10 elections. V.M.C. Sivakumar alone won 5 elections with 4 continuous win from 1996 to 2011. He had been a DMK leader who moved to AIADMK in the year 2016. He lost his last election in 2016 to Geetha Anandan from DMK. He was murdered by armed gang due to personal enmity in 2017 January.

== Term as MLA ==
V.M.C. Sivakumar as a DMK leader has won four elections in the 1980, 1996, 2001, 2006 elections in Neravy T R Pattinam (Union Territory Assembly constituency). In the election of 2011 he won as an independent candidate, which was his 5th term as MLA.

== Assassination ==
An armed gang murdered Sivakumar in January 2017. The reason was said to be the personal enmity between Sivakumar and a liquor baron Ramu's family. Days later, it was found Ramu's second wife Ezhilarasi's role was behind the murder.
