= Mahé Municipality =

Type
- Type: Municipality of the Mahé, Puducherry

Leadership
- Municipal Commissioner: Sunil Kumar
- Municipal Chairman: Vacant since 2011
- Seats: 10

Elections
- Voting system: First past the post
- Last election: 2006

Meeting place
- Mahé Municipality, Mahé

Website
- mahe.gov.in

Mahé Municipality is the seat of local administration of the Mahé Region which belongs to the union territory of Puducherry. Mahé Municipality has been in existence for more than 200 years since its establishment under the French regime. The Mahé Municipal area comprises 9 km^{2} with a single assembly constituency. The last mayor and the first chairman of this municipality was the late V. N. Purushothaman. A municipal council was not in existence with effect from 1978. Thereafter the regional administrator, Mahé / regional executive officer, Mahé exercised the power of the chairman and vice-chairman in the capacity of special officer of Mahé Municipal Council. After 1978, an elected municipal council was only in power during 2006–11.

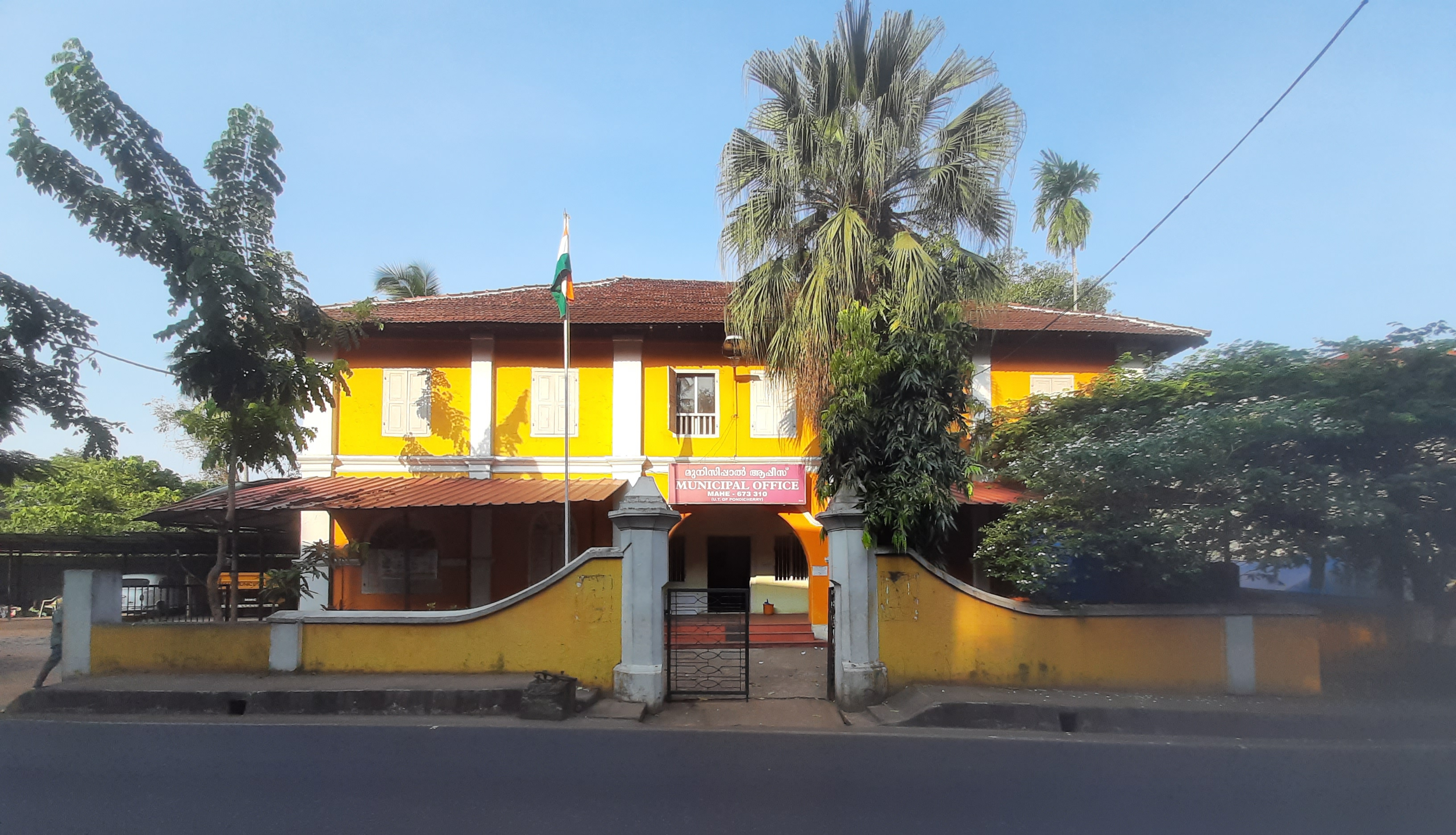
Mahé Municipal Office

== Wards of Mahé Municipality ==
Mahé Municipality consisted of 15 wards until 2021. These 15 wards were used for the 2006 municipal elections:

Mahé Pocket

- Manjakkal (W)
- Choodikotta
- Parakkal (W)
- Valavil (W)
- Mundock

Cherukallayi Pocket

- Cherukallayi (W)

Naluthara Pocket

- Chalakkara (Chalakkara (South))
- Chembra (Chalakkara (North))
- Palloor (South-West) (W)
- Palloor (South-East)
- Palloor (North-West)
- Palloor (North-East)
- Pandakkal (South)
- Pandakkal (Centre)
- Pandakkal (North)

== Present situation ==
Civic elections were held in 2006 after nearly 30 years. The chairman and vice-chairman of Mahé Municipality were Ramesh Parambath and P.P. Vinodan. The chairman and the fifteen councillors of Mahé Municipality were sworn in during July 2006.

The councillors were:

- A.P. Sheeja (Ward No.1 - Parakkal)
- P.P. Vinodan (Ward No.2 - Choodikotta; vice-chairman)
- P. Karthiyayani (Ward No.3 - Valavil)
- Pallian Pramod (Ward No.4 - Mundock)
- Sainaba (Ward No.5 - Manjakkal)
- Sathyan Keloth (Ward No.6 - Chalakkara [South])
- K.V. Shobha (Ward No.6A - Cherukallayi)
- Uthaman Thittayil (Ward No.7 - Chalakkara (North])
- P.T.C. Shobha (Ward No.8 - Palloor [South-West])
- E.V. Narayanan (Ward No.9 - Palloor [South-East])
- Arikulath M.P. Basheer (Ward No.10 - Palloor [North-East])
- Kannipoyil Babu (Ward No.11 - Palloor [North-West])
- Vadakkan Janardhanan (Ward No.12 - Pandakkal [South])
- T.K. Gangadharan (Ward No.13 - Pandakkal [Centre])
- K.V. Mohanan (Ward No.14 - Pandakkal [North])

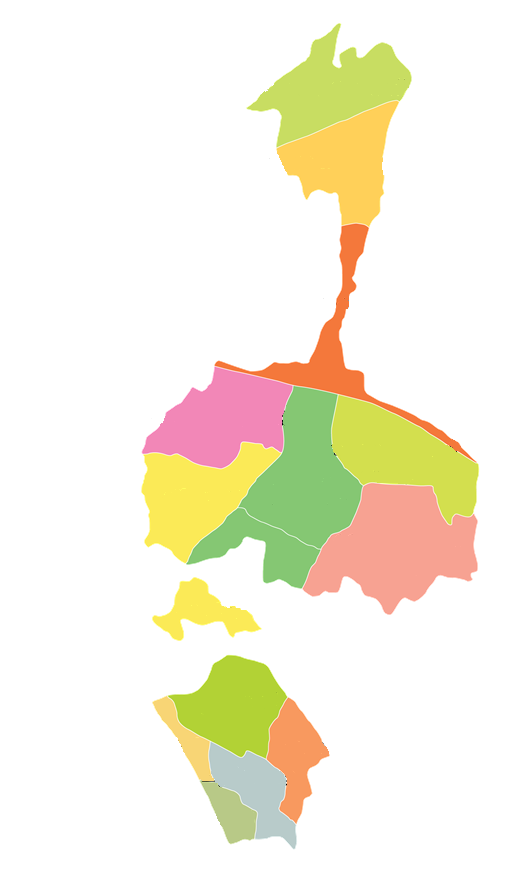
Mahé Municipality with ward boundaries used for the 2006 municipal election. There are 15 wards in total.

=== Since 2011 ===
Local body elections were not held in 2011 due to political issues and legal battles. Although there were some moves to conduct elections, they were thwarted by legal disputes and political infighting. The crisis became worse during the time of the 2016–21 Congress government when Kiran Bedi IPS (Retd.) was the lieutenant governor of Puducherry. The Supreme Court of India ordered the Government to conduct polls in 2018. But polls didn't take place. In 2019, the lieutenant governor did not accept the Government's choice for state election commissioner. Instead, the governor appointed a retired IFS officer, Roy P. Thomas, as state election commissioner. Legal and political battles on many issues like delimitation continued until 2021.

In 2021, a contempt petition was filed in the Supreme Court against the State Election Commission (SEC) for not holding local body elections. The Supreme Court heard the case and pronounced its verdict on 5 April 2021. The Court ordered that the State Government and the SEC should complete delimitation of wards, consider grievances from the people and hold the polls within four months of completing delimitation. It was widely expected that local body elections would be held between August and September.

Municipal wards in Mahé were determined on the basis of the 2011 Census. Contrary to normal practice across India, Mahé had its municipal wards reduced from the earlier 15 to 10, despite registering a growth in the population between the 2001 and 2011 Censuses. The State Election Commission released the final delimitation report in June 2021.

Mahé municipal wards from 2021 (based on the 2011 census):

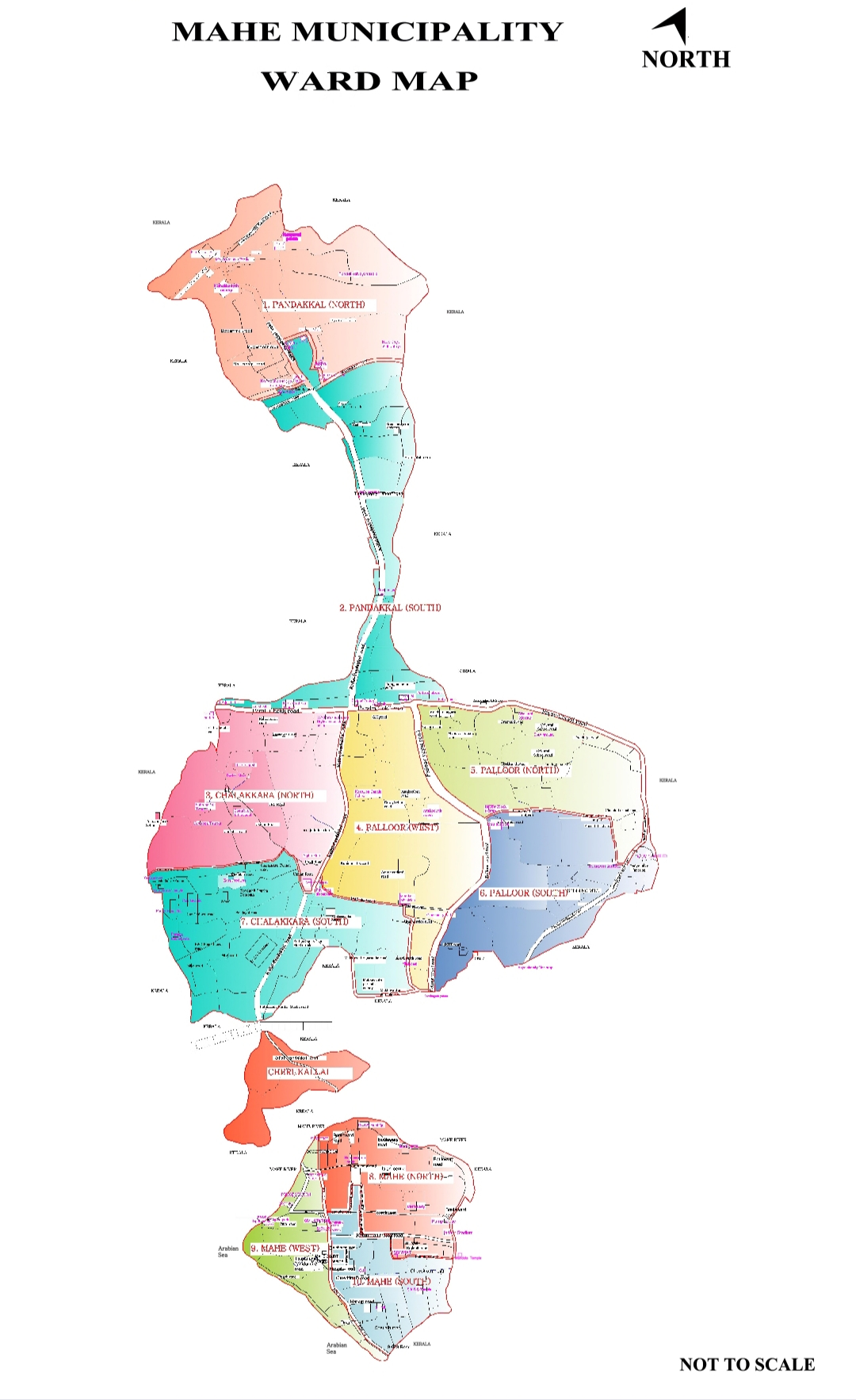
Mahé Municipality with 2021 ward boundaries

Mahé Municipal Council
Ward number	Ward name
1	Pandakkal (North)
2	Pandakkal (South)
3	Chalakkara (North)
4	Palloor (West)
5	Palloor (North)
6	Palloor (South)
7	Chalakkara (South)
8	Mahé (North)
9	Mahé (West)
10	Mahé (South)
