= Naluthara =

Naluthara enclave is one of three major regions in Mahé district, in the Union Territory of Puducherry, India. It is situated between Ponniyam river to the north and Kozhikode–Tellicherry road to the south.

French restitution of Naluthara enclave to India, including the villages of Chalakkara, Chembra, Palloor, and Pandakkal, took place in 1853.
