= Mahe Assembly constituency =

Constituency of the Puducherry legislative assembly in India

Coordinates: 11.700°N 75.539°E

Mahe
- Constituency No. 29 for the Puducherry Legislative Assembly
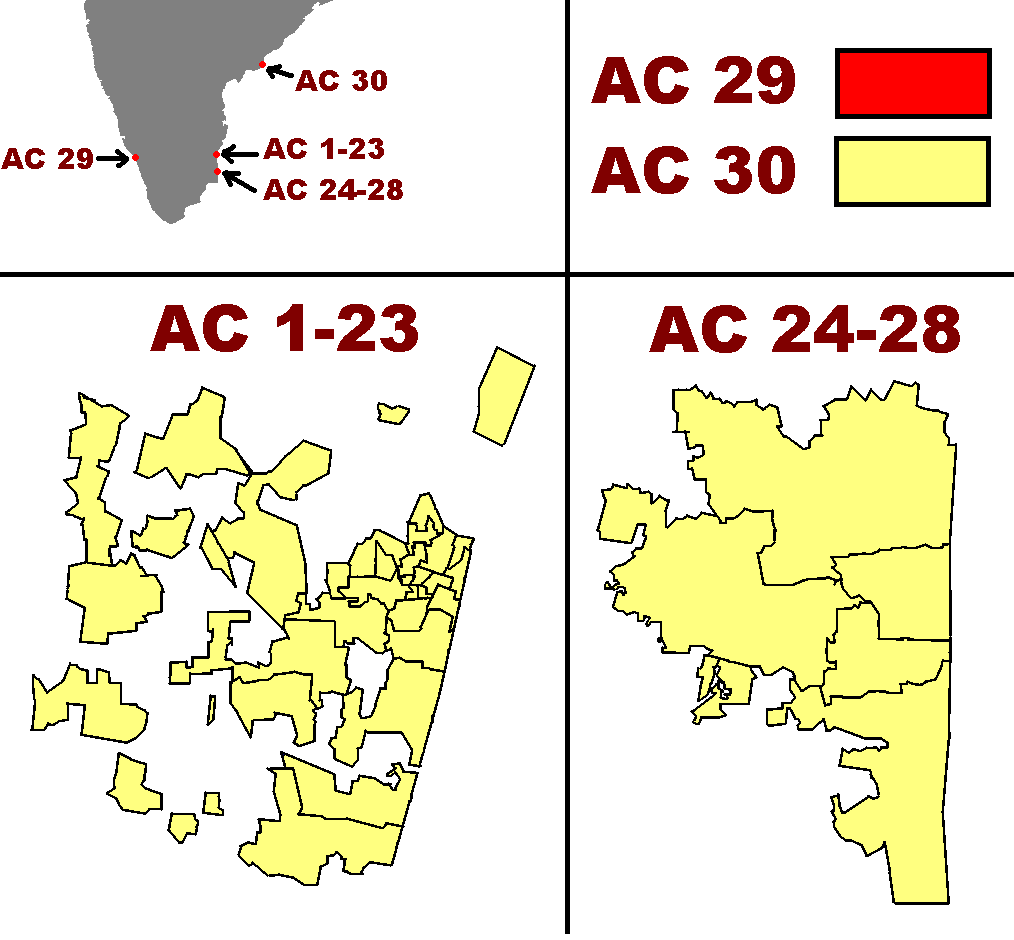

Constituency details
- Country: India
- Region: South India
- Union Territory: Puducherry
- District: Mahe
- Lok Sabha constituency: Puducherry
- Established: 1964
- Total electors: 31,092
- Reservation: None

Member of Legislative Assembly
- 16th Puducherry Legislative Assembly
- Incumbent Adv. T. Ashok Kumar
- Party: Independent
- Elected year: 2026

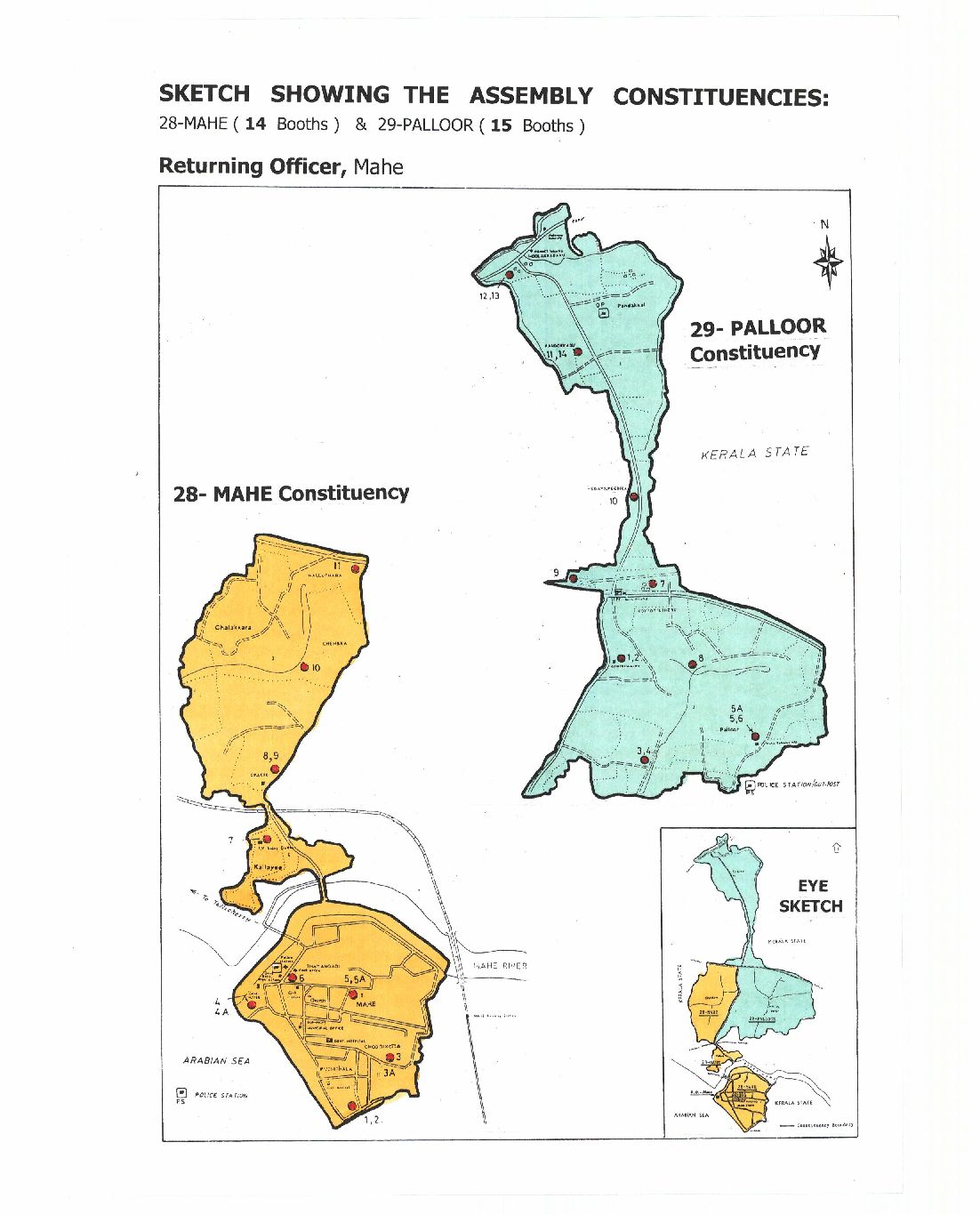
A map showing the erstwhile Mahe and Palloor Assembly Constituencies

Mahe is a legislative assembly constituency in the Union territory of Puducherry in India, covering the area of Mahe. Mahe Assembly constituency is part of Puducherry Lok Sabha constituency.

From 1964 to 2011, the Mahe region had two Assembly Constituencies - Mahe and Palloor. Mahe Assembly constituency included areas of Mahe, Cherukallayi and Chalakkara, whereas Palloor constituency comprised Palloor and Pandakkal areas.

Palloor Assembly constituency was abolished for the 2011 Assembly election. Thus, the whole of Mahe came under the enlarged Mahe Constituency since 2011.

== Members of Legislative Assembly ==
Year	Member	Party
1959	P. K. Raman	Indian National Congress
1964	Valavil Keshavan	Indian National Congress
1969	I. K. Kumaran	Independent
1969	Kunnummal Raghavan	Communist Party of India
1974	K. V. Raghavan	Communist Party of India
1977	K. V. Raghavan	Communist Party of India
1980	K. V. Raghavan	Communist Party of India
1985	P. K. Sathyanandan	Indian National Congress
1990	E. Valsaraj	Indian National Congress
1991	E. Valsaraj	Indian National Congress
1996	E. Valsaraj	Indian National Congress
2001	E. Valsaraj	Indian National Congress
2006	E. Valsaraj	Indian National Congress
2011	E. Valsaraj	Indian National Congress
2016	V. Ramachandran	Independent
2021	Ramesh Parambath	Indian National Congress
2026	Adv. T. Ashok Kumar	Independent

== Election results ==
Vote share of Winning candidates
2026	35.19%
2021	41.63%
2016	45.96%
2011	60.51%
2006	55.74%
2001	59.87%
1996	45.58%
1991	62.62%
1990	56.05%
1985	53.04%
1980	48.17%
1977	48.58%
1974	33.03%
1969	59.33%
1964	50.14%

=== 2026 ===
2026 Puducherry Legislative Assembly election: Mahe
Party	Candidate	Votes	%	±%
IND	Adv. T. Ashok Kumar	8,375	35.19	
INC	Ramesh Parambath	7,260	30.50	▼11.13
BJP	A. Dinesan	6,969	29.28	
IUML	Mohamed Sameel	800	3.36	
NOTA	None of the above	143	0.60	▼0.34
TVK	M. Prijesh	122	0.51	
IND	M. Ashokan	63	0.26	
IND	P. P. Saraswathi	45	0.19	
IND	Ramesh	24	0.10	
Majority		1,115	4.69	▲3.41
Turnout		23,801	78.67	▲3.38
Independent gain from INC		Swing		

=== 2021 ===
2021 Puducherry Legislative Assembly election: Mahe
Party	Candidate	Votes	%	±%
INC	Ramesh Parambath	9,744	41.63	▲4.75
IND	N. Haridasan Master	9,444	40.35	
AINRC	Adv. V. P. Abdul Rahman	3,532	15.09	▲8.05
SDPI	C. K. Ummer Master	319	1.36	▲0.48
NOTA	None of the above	221	0.94	▲0.48
DMDK	Janaky Teacher	86	0.37	
IND	Sarath S. Unnithan	62	0.26	
Majority		300	1.28	▼7.83
Turnout		23,408	75.29	▼2.50
INC gain from Independent		Swing		

=== 2016 ===
2016 Puducherry Legislative Assembly election: Mahe
Party	Candidate	Votes	%	±%
IND	Dr. V. Ramachandran	10,797	45.99	
INC	E. Valsaraj	8,658	36.88	▼23.63
BJP	P. T. Devarajan	1,653	7.04	▲0.29
AINRC	V. P. Abdul Rahman	1,653	7.04	
SDPI	C. K. Ummer Master	206	0.88	
IND	K. E. Sulochana	182	0.78	
NOTA	None of the above	109	0.46	
AIADMK	C. K. Bhaskaran	97	0.41	
IND	Janaky Teacher	51	0.22	
PMK	V. V. Shaj Kumar	49	0.21	
IND	Thayalakath Kadarkutty	24	0.10	
Majority		2,139	9.11	▼18.67
Turnout		23,479	77.79	▲0.64
Independent gain from INC		Swing		

=== 2011 ===
2011 Puducherry Legislative Assembly election: Mahe
Party	Candidate	Votes	%	±%
INC	E. Valsaraj	13,297	60.51	▲4.75
CPI(M)	T. K. Gangadharan	7,193	32.73	▼3.81
BJP	N. K. Rajeendran	1,484	6.75	▲0.91
Majority		6,104	27.78	▲8.56
Turnout		21,974	77.15	▼2.85
INC hold		Swing		

=== 2006 ===
2006 Pondicherry Legislative Assembly election: Mahe
Party	Candidate	Votes	%	±%
INC	E. Valsaraj	5,647	55.76	▼4.11
CPI(M)	Adv. T. Ashok Kumar	3,700	36.54	
BJP	V. Balan	591	5.84	▼0.46
AIADMK	Vijayan	189	1.87	▲1.12
Majority		1,947	19.22	▼7.57
Turnout		10,131	80.00	▲7.05
INC hold		Swing		

=== 2001 ===
2001 Pondicherry Legislative Assembly election: Mahe
Party	Candidate	Votes	%	±%
INC	E. Valsaraj	5,666	59.87	▲14.29
IND	Manoli Muhammad	3,131	33.08	
BJP	East Namath Rajeendran	596	6.30	▼5.11
AIADMK	K. Lakshmanan	71	0.75	
Majority		2,535	26.79	▲23.86
Turnout		9,468	72.95	▼3.11
INC hold		Swing		

=== 1996 ===
1996 Pondicherry Legislative Assembly election: Mahe
Party	Candidate	Votes	%	±%
INC	E. Valsaraj	4,184	45.58	▼17.04
IND	Manoly Muhammad	3,915	42.65	
BJP	V. P. Krishnaraj	1,047	11.41	▲4.75
IND	K. K. Musthafa	34	0.37	
Majority		269	2.93	▼29.96
Turnout		9,252	76.06	▲5.97
INC hold		Swing		

=== 1991 ===
1991 Pondicherry Legislative Assembly election: Mahe
Party	Candidate	Votes	%	±%
INC	E. Valsaraj	5,099	62.62	▲6.57
CPI(M)	K. V. Raghavan	2,421	29.73	▼6.28
BJP	P. Chandran	542	6.66	▲0.60
IND	C. P. Hamza	53	0.65	
IND	M. J. Razario	28	0.34	
Majority		2,678	32.89	▲12.85
Turnout		8,293	70.09	▼8.82
INC hold		Swing		

=== 1990 ===
1990 Pondicherry Legislative Assembly election: Mahe
Party	Candidate	Votes	%	±%
INC	E. Valsaraj	5,142	56.05	
CPI(M)	Mukkath Jayan	3,304	36.01	▼9.14
BJP	C. P. Ganeshan	556	6.06	
IND	M. Sidharthan	125	1.36	
IND	P. Chandran	30	0.33	
IND	Badaruddeen	17	0.19	
Majority		1,838	20.04	▲5.54
Turnout		9,206	78.91	▲4.94
INC hold		Swing		

=== 1985 ===
1985 Pondicherry Legislative Assembly election: Mahe
Party	Candidate	Votes	%	±%
INC	P. K. Sathyanandan	3,695	53.04	
CPI(M)	K. V. Raghavan	2,719	39.03	
IUML	C. V. Sulaiman Hajee	447	6.42	
IND	Valavil Sudhakaran	42	0.60	
IND	Abdul Gaffoor	38	0.55	
IND	V. K. Bharathan	25	0.36	
Majority		976	14.01	
Turnout		6,989	82.14	
INC gain from CPI(M)		Swing		

=== 1980 ===
1980 Pondicherry Legislative Assembly election: Mahe
Party	Candidate	Votes	%	±%
CPI(M)	K. V. Raghavan	2,638	48.17	
IND	C. V. Sulaiman Hajee	2,174	39.70	
IND	N. Chakrapani	358	6.54	
IND	Mani Bharathan	178	3.25	
IND	V. P. Ramakrishnan	117	2.14	
IND	Poothara Narayanan	11	0.20	
Majority		464	8.47	
Turnout		5,738	77.20	
CPI(M) gain from Independent		Swing		

=== 1977 ===
1977 Pondicherry Legislative Assembly election: Mahe
Party	Candidate	Votes	%	±%
IND	K. V. Raghavan	2,847	48.58	
INC	P. K. Raman	2,835	48.38	
IND	P. K. Muraleedharan	178	3.04	
Majority		12	0.20	
Turnout		5,903	80.46	
Independent gain from CPI(M)		Swing		

=== 1974 ===
1974 Pondicherry Legislative Assembly election: Mahe
Party	Candidate	Votes	%	±%
CPI(M)	Kunnummal Raghavan	1,816	33.03	
IND	Iraye Kunnathitathil Kumaran	1,528	27.79	
INC	Candotte Errambally Bharathan	1,268	23.06	
IND	Nalupurayil Velandi Chakrapani	824	14.99	
IND	Poothata Narayanan	62	1.13	
Majority		288	5.24	
Turnout		5,615	85.02	
CPI(M) gain from Independent		Swing		

=== 1969 ===
1969 Pondicherry Legislative Assembly election: Mahe
Party	Candidate	Votes	%	±%
IND	I. K. Kumaran	2,885	59.33	
INC	Valavil Kesavan	1,978	40.67	
Majority		907	18.66	
Turnout		4,903	83.50	
Independent gain from INC		Swing		

=== 1964 ===
1964 Pondicherry Legislative Assembly election: Mahe
Party	Candidate	Votes	%	±%
INC	Valavil Keshavan	2,283	50.14	
IND	Irayi Kunnethaduthil Kumaran	2,270	49.86	
Majority		13	0.28	
Turnout		4,600	90.18	
INC win (new seat)				

== See also ==
- List of constituencies of the Puducherry Legislative Assembly
- Mahe district
