= Kodur, Malappuram =

Census town in Kerala, India

Kodur
- Census town
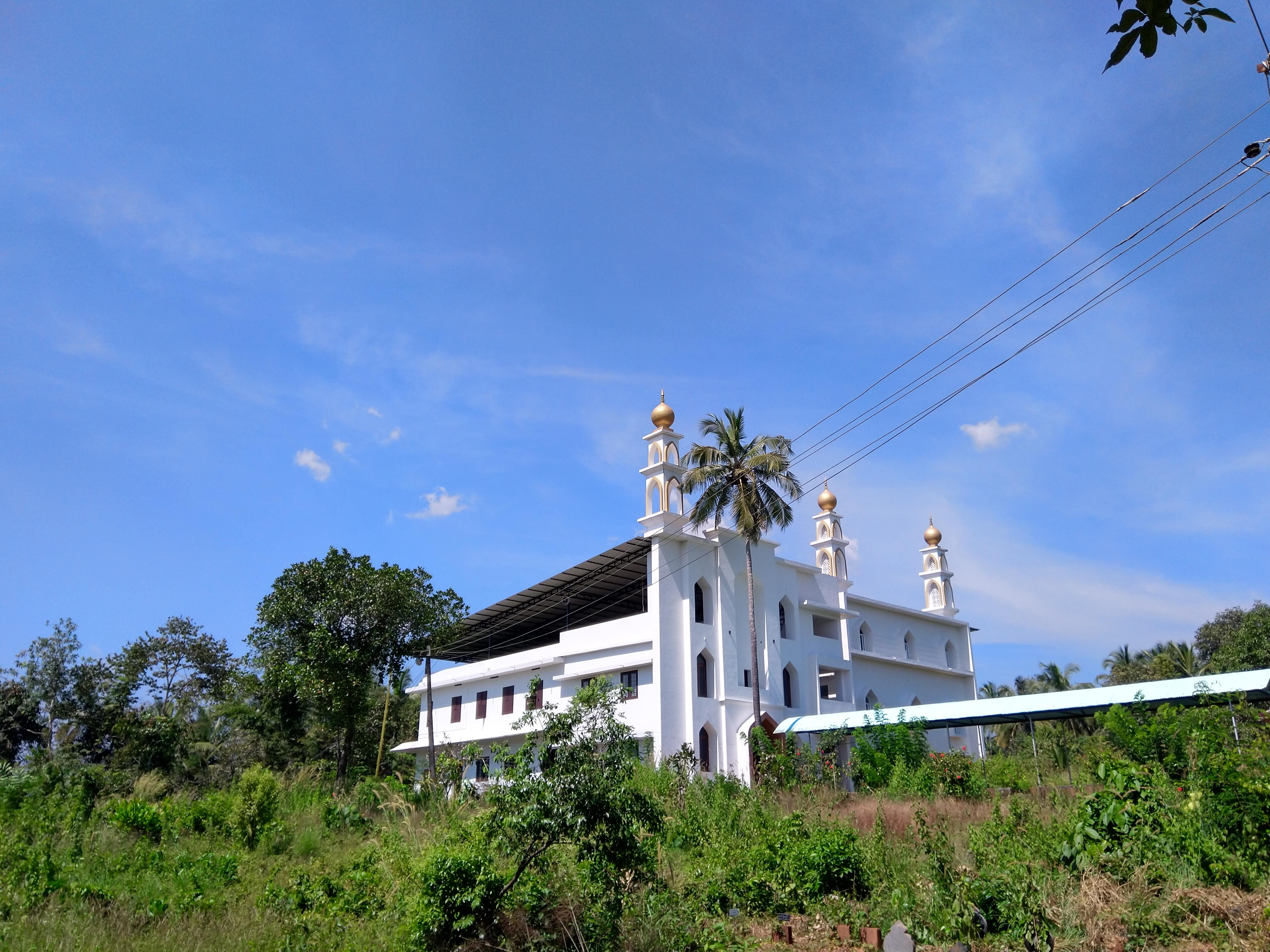
- A Mosque in Kodur

- Location in Kerala, India
- Coordinates: 11°1′0″N 76°4′0″E
- Country: India
- State: Kerala
- District: Malappuram

Population (2011)
  - Total: 45,459

Languages
  - Official: Malayalam
- Time zone: UTC+5:30 (IST)
- PIN: 676504
- Telephone code: 91-483
- Vehicle registration: KL-53
- Nearest city: Malappuram
- Lok Sabha constituency: Malappuram
- Vidhan Sabha constituency: Malappuram
- Climate: cool (Köppen)

Kodur is a census town and a suburb of Malappuram, India.

Kodur covers about 23 wards. The Kodur panchayat office is located in the ward called Thanikkal. It belongs to North Kerala Division. It is located 5 km towards South from District headquarters Malappuram. 11 km from Mankada. 346 km from State capital Thiruvananthapuram. Kodur is part of Malappuram Assembly constituency as well as Malappuram (Lok Sabha constituency).

== Places ==
- Chelur
- Chemmankadavu
- Palakkal
- Parakkal
- Valiyad

== Hospitals ==
- Health Center
- Ayurvedic Hospital

== Demographics ==
As of 2011 India census, Kodur had a population of 45459 with 21627 males and 23,832 females.

== Railway ==
There is no railway station near to Kodur in less than 10 km. However Kozhikode Rail Way Station is major railway station 47 km near to Kodur. Angadipuram at 16 km on Shoranur-Nilambur line is the nearest railway station thou with limited services and Tirur at 22 km is the nearest railway station with major services and stops for most long route trains.

== Government Offices ==
- Panchayath Office Thanikkal
- Public Health Center Thanikkal
- Agriculture Office Thanikkal
- Post Office Chemmankadavu
- Village Office Chemmankadavu
- GLPS Vadakkemanna
