= Ramesh Parambath =

Indian politician

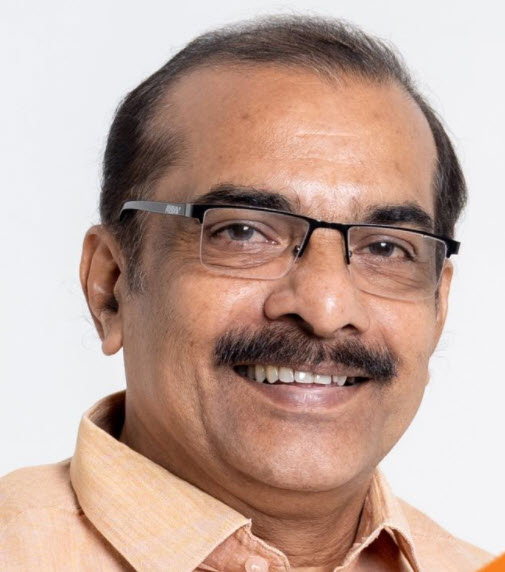

Member of the Puducherry Legislative Assembly
- In office 26 May 2021 – 4 May 2026
- Preceded by: V. Ramachandran
- Succeeded by: T. Ashok Kumar
- Constituency: Mahe

Personal details
- Born: 23 May 1961 (age 65) Palloor, Mahe, India
- Party: Indian National Congress
- Spouse: Sayana Ramesh
- Children: 2
- Parents: Late. P.P. Kannan; Late. K. Bharathy
- Education: Mahatma Gandhi Government Arts College

Ramesh Parambath (born 23 May 1961) is an Indian politician and was a former member of the Puducherry Legislative Assembly. He is a member of the Indian National Congress represented Mahe constituency.

== Political career ==
Parambath started his political life as a member of the Kerala Students Union. He was the unit president of the KSU at Mahatma Gandhi Govt Arts College Mahe. He was elected as the Chairman of the College Union of Mahatma Gandhi Govt Arts College Mahe, for two consecutive terms during 1984-85 and 1985-86. He became the President of Mahe Regional Youth Congress Committee during 1989 to 1997. He was also the member of Puducherry DCC. He was elected as the Municipal Chairman of Mahe Municipal Council from 2006 to 2011. He was the President of Block Congress Committee, Mahe region.

In the 2021 Puducherry Legislative Assembly election, he regained the Mahe Assembly Constituency for the Congress in a tight race by defeating LDF independent N. Haridasan Master.

In the 2026 Puducherry Legislative Assembly election, he again lost the Mahe Assembly Constituency for the Congress to LDF independent candidate T. Ashok Kumar.

== Personal life ==
Ramesh was born at Palloor on 23 May 1961 to Parambath Kannan and K. Bharathy. He is a B.Com graduate. He is married to Sayana and the couple have two sons Yadhukul Parambath and Anand Ram.
