= Indira Gandhi Polytechnic College, Mahe =

Indira Gandhi Polytechnic College Mahe
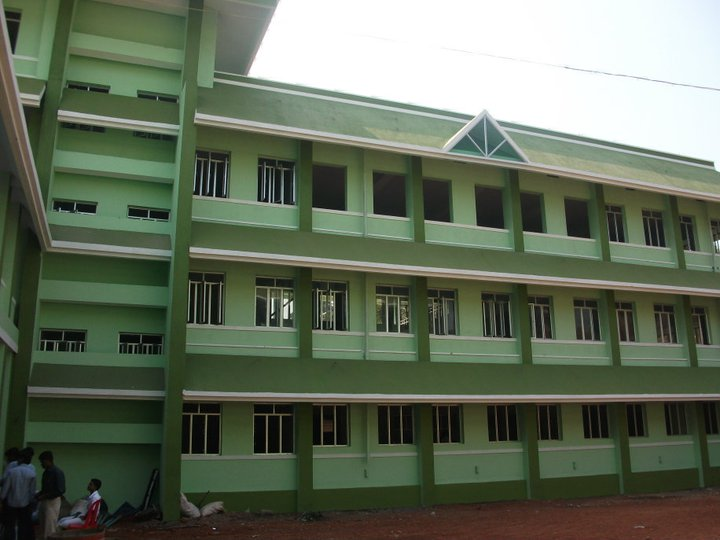
- Motto: Technology Triumphs.
- Type: Public Institution
- Established: October 2000
- Academic staff: ~30
- Location: Mahe, Kerala, India; 11.721°N 75.529°E
- Campus: Rural
- Website: https://www.igptc-mahe.org/

Indira Gandhi Polytechnic College is an educational institution in Mahe, Pondicherry. The Polytechnic College was established in the year 2000 under the supervision of PIPMATE and is funded by Government of Puducherry in collaboration with Department of Higher Education (Tamil Nadu). The college was initially named as "Mahe Polytechnic College" and commonly known as "IGPTC" among students and the alumni. The institute is named after the former prime minister of India, and social reformer Indira Priyadarshini Gandhi. The college campus was functioning temporarily in Rajiv Gandhi ITI Campus till 2012 and later shifted to its own campus.

== About ==
IGPTC campus is located off the Mahe-Palloor main road in Chalakkara. The campus houses two main blocks connected by a skywalk.

- The institute is provided with high-tech Laboratories with workstations interfaced with Computers, Digital and Microprocessor Labs have been established for Instrumentation & Control Engineering and Computer Engineering Department.
- A number of 30 desktop computers with i3 processor and one 10KVA UPS with 1 hour backup have been purchased for the PC. Lab of the Instrumentation & Control Engg. Department utilizing the MHRD fund during the financial year 2016-17.
- Training & Placement section has placed number of students in various Multi National Companies. Implant training is also provided to the final year students every year in reputed firms.
- The project "Centralized Automated Toll Station in Highways" the sixth semester students of the academic year 2003-2004 secured 1st place in the state Level Project exhibition among the entire polytechnic Colleges of Tamil Nadu and Puducherry region.
- The project “Intelligent Railway Control System" by the sixth semester students of the academic year 2004-2005 secured 1st place in the Regional Level Project exhibition held at Kongu polytechnic College, Perundurai., Erode on 19-08-2005 and qualified for participating in the State Level Competition.
- This Institution, in co-operation with D.R.D.A., Mahe conducts a seminar for students on the subject "Renewable Energy Sources" every year in connection with the Renewable Energy Day.

== Courses offered ==
- Diploma in Computer Engineering
- Diploma in Instrumentation and Control Engineering
- Diploma in Mechanical Engineering
- Diploma in Electrical & Electronics Engineering

== Laboratories ==
- Process control Instrumentation Lab & Instrumentation Lab
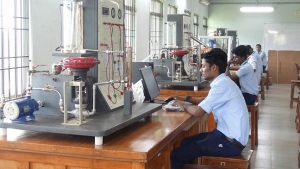
  Image of the Instrumentation lab the campus facilitates
- Electronics Lab & Microprocessor Lab
- Computer Centre
- Hardware & Networking Lab
- Physics Lab
- Chemistry Lab
- English Communication Lab
- Workshop for 1 year Engineering
- Auto cad lab
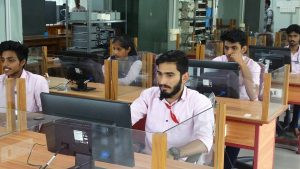
  Image of the computer lab the campus facilitates
- Wiring and Winding Lab
- Electrical Machines Lab
- Microprocessor & Microcontroller Lab
- Power Electronics Lab
- Electrical Machines Lab
- Metrology & Metallographic Lab
- Instrumentation PC Lab

== Admission ==
- The qualifying examination for admission is Matric/SSLC or equivalent examination. Another 19 students who have passed Higher Secondary Examination (10+2) (Academic/Vocational)/passed 2 year ITI are admitted in the second year class under the Lateral Entry Scheme.
- This institution is in its Seventeenth year and fifteen batches of students have passed out as on April’2017 with good academic record.
- Admission to the diploma courses is for Residents of U.T. of Puducherry only. However, as per order No: H/4/4/PIPMATE/2017/A4/877 dt: 11-08-2017 of the Member Secretary PIPMATE, Puducherry, the unfilled seats after admitting the resident students will be filled with the candidates from Other States on merit basis.
- Candidate seeking admission to First Year should have passed S.S.L.C. (10 years of schooling under new regulation with eligibility for admission to Higher Secondary course of study) or any other qualification recognized as equivalent and approved by the Director of School Education, Chennai, Tamil Nadu and endorsed by the Directorate of Technical Education, Chennai, and Tamil Nadu.
- Candidates seeking admission to second year under reservation for Academic Stream should have passed Higher Secondary Course (Academic Stream) examination with Mathematics, Physics & Chemistry subjects for Engineering Courses, Commerce & Accountancy for Modern Office Practice Course conducted by the Board of Higher Secondary Education, Tamil Nadu and endorsed by the Directorate of Technical Education, Chennai, Tamil Nadu with eligibility for admission to University course of study.

== MHRD assistance ==
Ministry of Human Resource Development (MHRD) Govt of India has sanctioned an assistance of Rs. 1.59 crores for improving the infrastructural facilities of this institution. In the first phase an amount of Rs. 20 Lakhs was released by the MHRD in the year 2011–12. In the second phase an amount of Rs. 1 crore has been released in the year 2015–16.

== Alumni ==
The Indira Gandhi Polytechnic College Alumni Association (IGPTCAA) has a highly active and growing community of over 500 alumni, living in over 20 countries. IGPTCAA is serving as forum to promote and foster good relationship between alumni, present students, management and teaching faculty. IGPTCAA has established endowment prize awards to the meritorious students.

It is the vision of the alumni of IGPTC-Mahe to project it as a successful and a leading institution of learning technology. One of the main components towards fulfilling such goal would be to motivate the students of the institution to win in their examinations and ultimately in life.

In order to encourage the financially unsound candidates the educational prospect at IGPTC-MAHE needs to be properly supported. These scholarships have been implemented by the contributions from the Alumni members across the globe and well wishers of IGPTC. We are confident that the relationship between the present and the past students will continue to grow in the years to come.

With this measure the Indira Gandhi polytechnic college alumni association with pleasure and pride launched an "INSPIRATION SCHOLARSHIP" for the economically backward students of IGPTC-MAHE.

== Achievements ==
- Project ”Centralized Automated Toll Station in Highways" by the sixth semester students of the academic year 2003-2004 secured 1st place in the state Level Project exhibition among the entire polytechnic colleges of Tamil Nadu and Puducherry region.
- Project “ Intelligent Railway Control System" by the sixth semester students of the academic year 2004-2005 secured 1st place in the Regional Level Project exhibition held at Kongu polytechnic College, Perundurai., Erode on 19-08-2005 and qualified for participating in the State Level Competition.
