= R. Raghuraman =

Administrator of Mahe
- In office 12 November 1975 – 30 June 1977
- Preceded by: S. Joseph Basil
- Succeeded by: C. A. Balaramasounarin

R. Raghuraman was an Indian civil servant and administrator. He was the administrator of Mahe from 12 November 1975 to 30 June 1977.
