= S. Joseph Basil =

Administrator of Mahe
- In office 27 November 1974 – 11 November 1975
- Preceded by: S. Malachamy
- Succeeded by: R. Raghuraman

S. Joseph Basil was an Indian civil servant and administrator. He was the administrator of Mahe from 27 November 1974 to 11 November 1975.
