= Pandakkal =

- Location within Kerala
- Country: India
- Union Territory: Puducherry
- District: Mahe

Government
  - Type: Municipality
  - Body: Mahe Municipality
  - MLA: Ramesh Parambath (INC)
- Time zone: UTC+05:30 (Indian Standard Time)
- Postal code: 673310

Pandakkal (IAST: pantakkal) is a town which forms a part of Mahé municipality of Puducherry, India. Pandhakkal is also known as "Pandhokaad". Pandhakkal is a small town which lies at the edge of Mahe.

== Institutions ==
=== Schools ===
- Jawahar Navodaya Vidyalaya, Mahe
- I. K. Kumaran Government Higher Secondary School
- Genesis International School
- Government Lower Primary School
- Moolakkadavu Lower Primary School
- Ideal Nursery and Upper Primary school

=== Temples ===
- Pandokkaavú Ayappa temple
- Pandokkooloth temple
- Manikkaampoil temple
