= S. Malachamy =

Indian civil servant and administrator

Administrator of Mahe
- In office 21 July 1973 – 26 November 1974
- Preceded by: C. A. Balaramasounarin
- Succeeded by: S. Joseph Basil

S. Malachamy was an Indian civil servant and administrator. He was the administrator of Mahe from 21 July 1973 to 26 November 1974.
