= T. Ashok Kumar =

Indian politician

Member of the Puducherry Legislative Assembly
- Incumbent
- Assumed office 2026
- Preceded by: Ramesh Parambath
- Constituency: Mahe

Personal details
- Party: Independent
- Profession: Politician

T. Ashok Kumar is an Indian politician from Puducherry. He is a member of the Puducherry Legislative Assembly from Mahe as an independent politician.

== Political career ==
Ashok Kumar won the Mahe seat in the 2026 Puducherry Legislative Assembly election as an independent candidate. He received 8,375 votes and defeated Ramesh Parambath of the Indian National Congress by a margin of 1,115 votes.
