= Manjakkal =

Ward in Pondicherry, India

Coordinates: 11°42′17.77″N 75°32′29.8″E

Manjakkal is a ward of Mahé municipality. It forms a part of the enclave Mahe district of Puducherry in India.
