= Kodiyeri Balakrishnan =

Indian politician and newspaper editor (1953–2022)

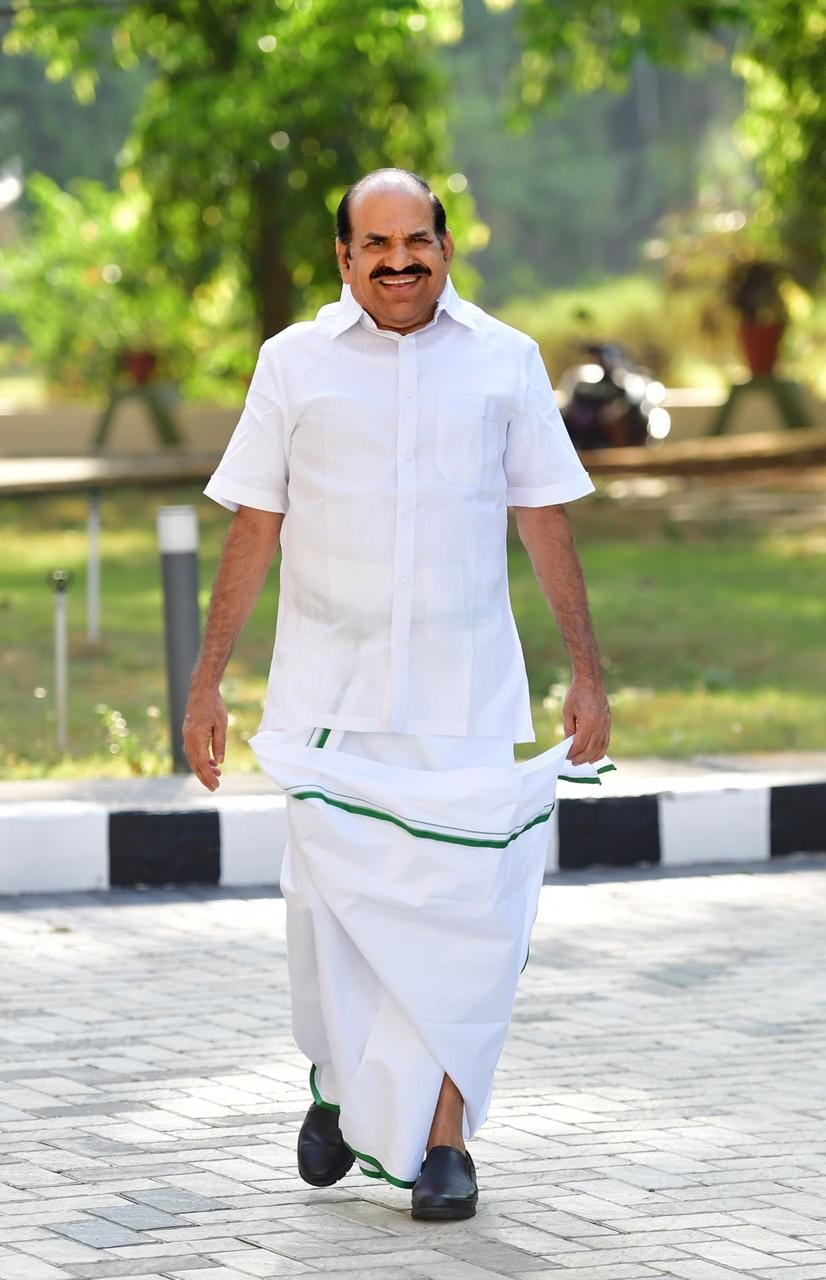

Minister for Home Affairs and Tourism, Kerala
- In office 18 May 2006 – 16 May 2011
- Chief minister: V. S. Achuthanandan
- Preceded by: Oommen Chandy
- Succeeded by: Oommen Chandy

Member of Legislative Assembly
- In office 2001 – 2016
- Constituency: Thalassery
- In office 1982 – 1991
- Constituency: Thalassery

Secretary of the Communist Party of India (Marxist) Kerala State Committee
- In office 23 February 2015 – 28 August 2022
- Preceded by: Pinarayi Vijayan
- Succeeded by: M. V. Govindan

Member of Politburo of the Communist Party of India (Marxist)
- In office 3 April 2008 – 1 October 2022

Personal details
- Born: 16 November 1953 Thalassery, Kerala, India
- Died: 1 October 2022 (aged 68) Chennai, Tamil Nadu, India
- Party: Communist Party of India (Marxist)
- Spouse: S. R. Vinodini (m. 1980)
- Children: 2
- Parents: Kunjunni Kurup; Narayani Amma
- Education: Mahatma Gandhi Government Arts College, Mahé; University College, Thiruvananthapuram

Kodiyeri Balakrishnan (16 November 1953 – 1 October 2022) was an Indian politician of the Communist Party of India (Marxist). He was the secretary of the CPI(M) Kerala State Committee from 2015 to 2022. He stepped down from the position of state secretary due to his failing health. He was the chief editor of the Malayalam newspaper Deshabhimani, the organ of the Kerala State Committee of the CPI(M).

Balakrishnan was the deputy leader of the opposition in the Kerala Legislative Assembly from 2001 to 2006 and again from 2011 to 2016, and also served as the state minister of home affairs and tourism from 2006 to 2011 under the Achuthanandan ministry. He represented Thalassery Assembly constituency in the Kerala Legislative Assembly from 1982 to 1991 and again from 2001 to 2016.

== Political life ==
Balakrishnan entered politics through the student wing of the CPI(M) in 1970. He was Secretary of the Kerala State Committee of the Students' Federation of India (SFI) and its All India Joint Secretary between 1973 and 1979. During the time of the emergency, Kodiyeri Balakrishnan was imprisoned under MISA for 16 months.

From 1980 to 1982, he was the Kannur District President of Democratic Youth Federation of India (DYFI). He was a CPI (M) Politburo member and was CPI (M) Parliamentary Party deputy leader. He was elected as an MLA to Kerala Legislative Assembly in 1982, 1987, 2001, 2006 and 2011 from Thalassery. He was Minister of Home Affairs and Tourism of Kerala during the V. S. Achudanandan Ministry. On 23 February 2015, he was elected as the secretary of the Communist Party of India (Marxist) Kerala State Committee for a period of three years. He was re-elected for a second term as a State Secretary in 2018 and for a third term in March 2022. On 28 August 2022, he stepped down from the position due to failing health and was succeeded by M. V. Govindan.

=== Ministry ===
Kodiyeri Balakrishnan served as the Deputy Leader of Opposition in the 11th Kerala Assembly. He served as the Home Minister of Government of Kerala in the 12th Kerala Assembly from 2006 to 2011. He is widely regarded for key initiatives in strengthening policing, modernisation, and community policing in his tenure. The Janamaithri Suraksha Project, launched during his tenure, marked a milestone in community policing and people friendly policing in Kerala.

== Personal life and death ==
Balakrishnan was born in Kodiyeri, Thalassery, to Kunjunni Kurup and Narayani Amma on 16 November 1953. He was the youngest child and only son of his parents. He had four elder sisters, all much older than him. He studied in Kodiyeri Junior Basic School and Oniyan High School. He became active in politics while studying at Mahatma Gandhi Government Arts College, Mahé and was active in University College, Thiruvananthapuram.

In 1980, he married S. R. Vinodini, daughter of ex-MLA M. V. Rajagopalan Master and had two children, Binoy Kodiyeri and Bineesh Kodiyeri.

Balakrishnan was diagnosed with pancreatic cancer and admitted to Apollo Hospital, Chennai from 28 August 2022 in view of worsening health. He died on 1 October 2022, at the age of 68. His body was taken to his hometown Kannur, and was cremated there with full state honours.
