= Kunhippalli =

Coordinates: 11.6783°N 75.5514°E

Kunhippalli is a place in Chombal near Mahe district, in the Union territory of Puducherry in India.

Kunhipalli has a mosque called Saidar Masjid where the burial place of Zainuddin Makhdoom II, who died in 1583 AD, is situated under a tree. A board in Malayalam inscribed with his name has been hung near his burial place.

Fat'h Ul Mueen, a textbook on Fiqh dealing with the Shafi'i school of Islamic jurisprudence, is one of the greatest works of Sheikh Zainuddin Makhdoom 2. His Tuhfat al-Mujahidin is a pioneering historical work dealing with the struggles of the Malabar Muslims against the Portuguese incursion in India. This work was first written in Arabic in the late 16th century based on the author's first-hand information of events and what he could gather from sources. In this book the author strongly encourages the people of Kerala, both Muslims and Non-Muslims to fight against Portuguese incursion in India.
