= St. Teresa's Shrine, Mahé =

St. Teresa’s Shrine Basilica, Mahé (Mahé Church)
- St. Teresa’s Shrine Basilica, Mahé (Mahé Basilica), India
- Basilica Sanctuaire de Sainte Thérèse, Mahé (Église de Mahé)
- St. Teresa’s Shrine Basilica, Mahé (Mahé Church)
- 11°42′4″N 75°32′12″E
- Location: Mahé
- Country: India
- Denomination: Roman Catholic Church
- Website: www.mahechurch.org

History
- Status: Minor Basilica
- Founded: 1736
- Dedication: St. Teresa of Avila
- Consecrated: 1736

Architecture
- Functional status: Active

Administration
- Archdiocese: Roman Catholic Archdiocese of Verapoly
- Diocese: Roman Catholic Diocese of Calicut

Clergy
- Archbishop: Joseph Kalathiparambil
- Bishop: Varghese Chakkalakal

St. Teresa's Shrine Basilica, Mahe (French: Basilica Sanctuaire de Sainte Thérèse) is a Catholic shrine to Saint Teresa of Ávila in Mahe, Puducherry. It is one of the most-visited shrines in India.

== History ==
According to a record which was discovered in the Carmelite Archives at Rome titled "De Missione Mahinensi in Malabaribus Commentarius" by Reverend Father Ignatius A.S Hippolytes O.C.D (dated 2 July 1757) the Shrine at Mahe was erected in 1736. According to the same document an Italian Reverend Father Dominic of St. John of the Cross came to Mahe and established the Mahe Mission in 1723 during the reign of King Bayanor, the Raja of Kadathanad near Vatakara. A small community of Christians gradually grew up at this place and in December 1736 the shrine was dedicated to this reformer Reverend Father Dominic of St. John of the Cross according to the solemn ritual of the Roman Catholic Church. Before becoming an established place of worship in 1736 the Shrine was constructed with thatches which were later modified several times.

The Carmelite Missionaries helped in the early and later formation of the church and the spiritual growth of the people of the place. More than 2000 adults, excluding children were baptized and received into the Church by them. However, in 1736 the Shrine is believed to have suffered some damage due to the wars between the French and the British. In March 1779 the shrine was damaged a greater extent or perhaps destroyed. But according to a government record about 1788 Abbe Duchenin renovated the shrine and gave it the form in which it is seen today. Afterwards the tower of the church was renovated in 1855 and a clock on the tower presented by the French Marines was fixed in the same year. In 1956 the shrine was once again renovated and was also electrified. During the subsequent years Avila Pilgrim Centre, Avila Bhavan (Sisters of Charity), St Teresa's Nursery and Primary School, Parish Hall and a New Presbytery were constructed. Many modifications to the Shrine have followed and a major renovation of the Shrine was undertaken in 2010.

Regarding the origin of the statue of St. Teresa there are two prominent beliefs. One is that this miraculous statue was carried in a ship along the West Coast and the ship was stopped at present Mahe and did not move afterward, whereupon the crew understood that it was the will of St. Teresa of Avila that this particular statue was to be enshrined at Mahe. The other tradition has it that this miraculous statue was caught in a fisherman's net in the sea near Mahe.

The Shrine of St. Teresa in Mahe is one of the most visited shrines in India. Situated in the Diocese of Calicut it has been elevated to the dignity of a Minor Basilica, thus becoming the first Minor Basilica in the environs of North Kerala. The Papal Decree conferring this honour on the popular place of devotion in Pondicherry was announced at a press conference by Bishop Varghese Chakkalakal on 19 December 2023.

== Feast of the Shrine ==
The feast of the Shrine is one of the important events of the place and it starts in the second week (5th) to fourth week (22nd) of every October with 14th and 15th being the main days of the feast. It is considered a festival of Mahe in which people from all over Kerala and from neighboring districts of Karnataka and Tamil Nadu take part irrespective of religion and caste.
