= Mahe Lighthouse =

Lighthouse in Kerala, India

Mahe Lighthouse Mayyazhi
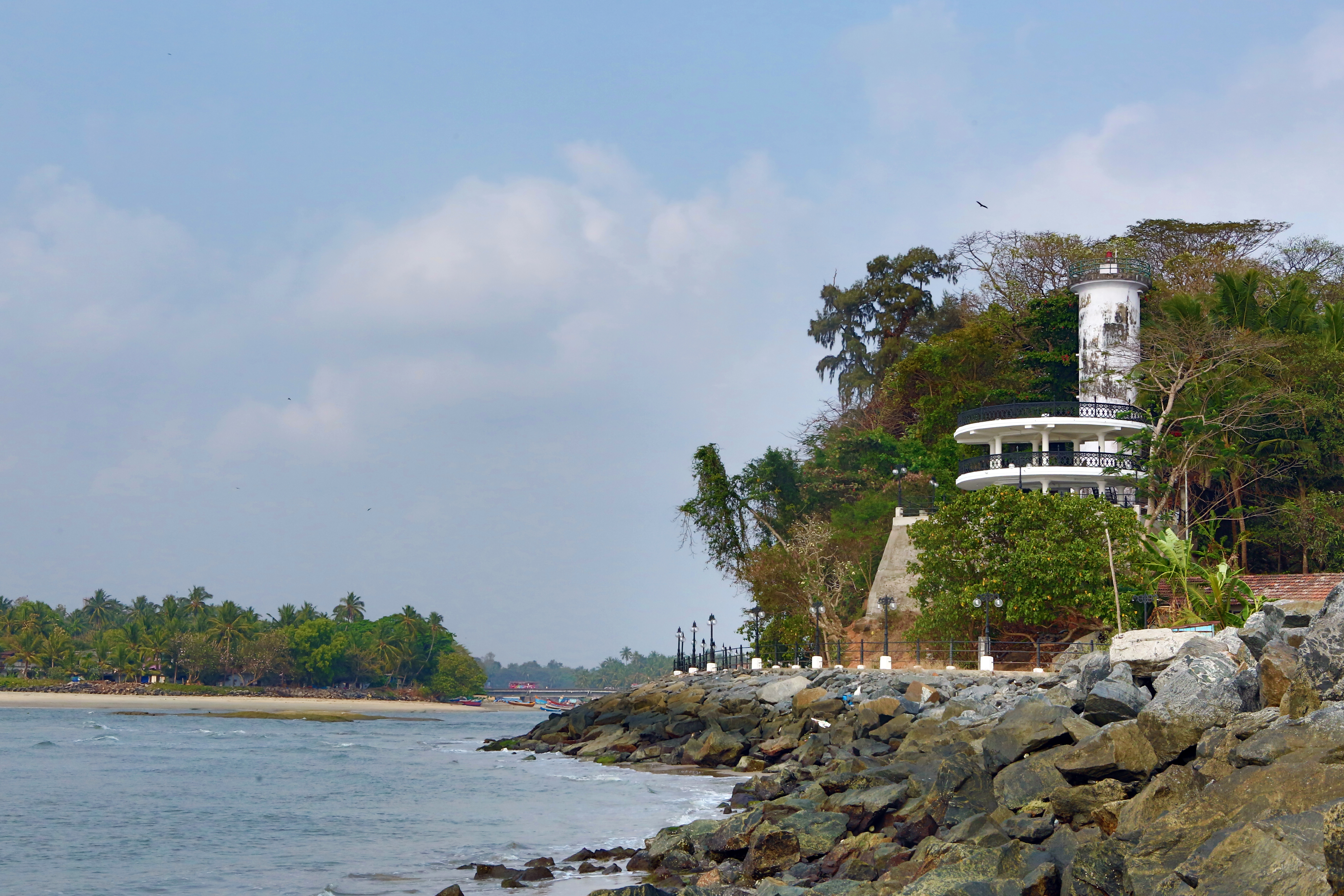
- The lighthouse in 2015
- Location: Mahé, India
- Coordinates: 11°42′08″N 75°31′48″E

Tower
- Constructed: 1893 (first)
- Construction: concrete tower
- Height: 13 metres (43 ft)
- Shape: cylindrical tower with balcony
- Markings: white tower

Light
- Focal height: 30 metres (98 ft)
- Light source: 400/500W Halogen Lamp (220/250 V AC)
- Range: 15 nautical miles (28 km; 17 mi)
- Characteristic: Fl (2) W 10s.

Mahe Lighthouse is a lighthouse situated on the south side of the entrance of Mayyazhi river in Mahe, Puducherry. It was established in the year 1893. There is a project by the Directorate General of Lighthouses and Lightships to upgrade the lighthouse.

== History ==
The Mahe Lighthouse station was established in 1885 by the British as a simple "white mast on a stone base" to guide vessels at the mouth of the Mayyazhi River. In 1893, a dedicated 13 m‑tall concrete cylindrical tower with a lantern gallery was constructed and first lit, providing the region's first permanent navigational light. Originally oil‑fed, its light source was upgraded in the late 20th century to a 400/500 W halogen lamp (220/250 V AC), extending its reliability and luminous range. In 2013, the Directorate General of Lighthouses and Lightships included Mahe Lighthouse in a nationwide tourism‑hub upgrade initiative, aiming to preserve and promote it as a heritage maritime landmark.

== Details ==
The focal plane of the beam is 30 m (98 ft). It emits two white flashes every 10 seconds. The structure is a 13-metre (43 feet) tall round cylindrical tower. It achieves a nominal range of 15 nautical miles. The original fourth‑order rotating drum optic remains in place, now driven by the halogen lamp assembly, and all maintenance is overseen by the DGLL under India's Ministry of Ports, Shipping and Waterways. The lighthouse stands at 11°51'5" N, 75°21'4" E on the south side of the river entrance, and continues active service as both a navigational aid and tourist attraction.

== See also ==
- List of lighthouses in India
- Pondicherry Lighthouse
