= Pondicherry Lighthouse =

Lighthouse in India

Pondicherry lighthouse Phare de Pondichéry
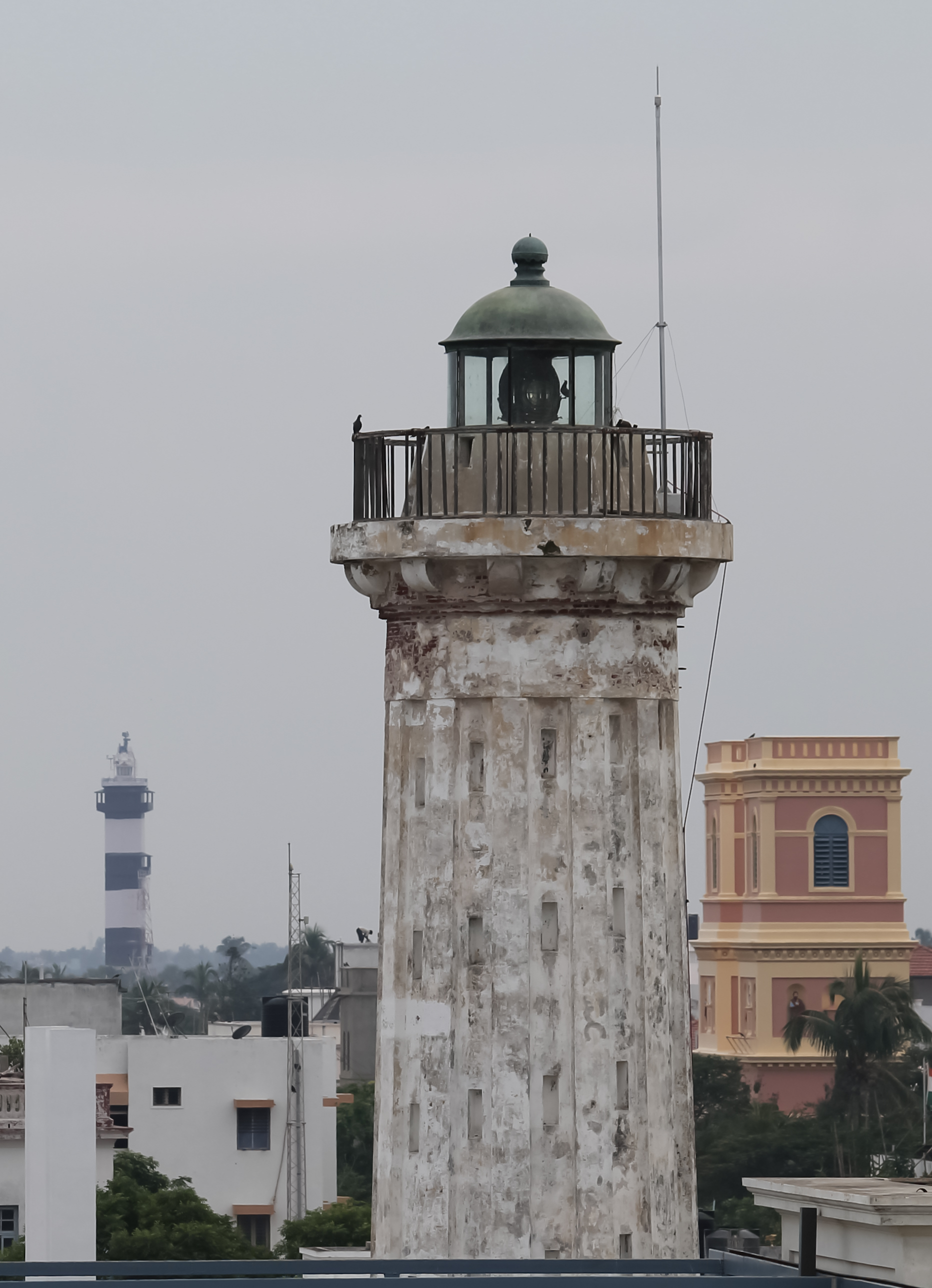
- The old lighthouse of Pondicherry. The new lighthouse is seen in the background.
- Location: Pondicherry, India
- Coordinates: 11°55′59″N 79°50′08″E

Tower
- Constructed: 1836
- Construction: stone (tower)
- Height: 27 m (89 ft)
- Shape: cylindrical tower with balcony and lantern
- Markings: White (tower), green (dome)

Light
- Deactivated: 1979
- Pondicherry lighthouse (new)
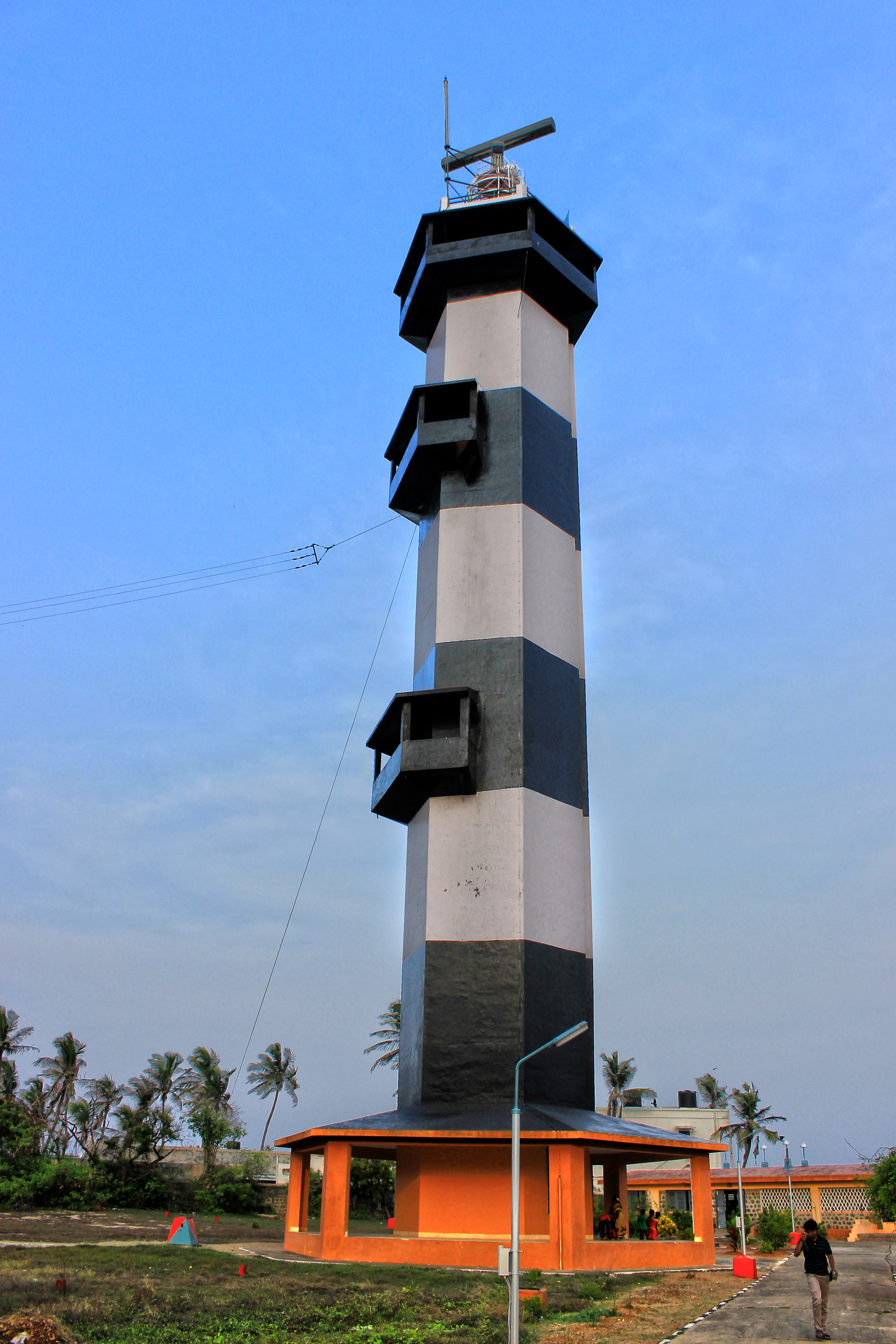
- Coordinates: 11°55′00″N 79°49′51″E
- Constructed: 1979
- Construction: concrete (tower)
- Height: 46 m (151 ft)
- Shape: hexagonal tower with balcony and lantern
- Markings: Black and white (tower)
- Focal height: 48 m (157 ft)
- Characteristic: Fl(2) W 15s

Pondicherry Lighthouse (French: Phare de Pondichéry) is a central government institution under ministry of ports, shipping and waterways, providing navigational aids to the mariners. The old lighthouse was constructed in Pondicherry in the nineteenth century by the French rulers. A new lighthouse was constructed in 20th century by the government of India. The old lighthouse had first beamed light on 1 September 1836. The new lighthouse started functioning in 1979.

== The old lighthouse ==
In nineteenth century, the only light to guide ships coming to Pondicherry was atop the Red Hills which was inadequate. The project was finally taken up during the tenure of Governor Saint Simon in 1835. Louis Guerre was the engineer of the project. The foundation stone for the lighthouse was laid at the end of 1835 and the inauguration ceremony took place in February 1836.

The height of the lighthouse is 29 meters. It has a round tower and a square base. The cost of construction was 10,000 francs. The foundation has a depth of nine meters. Its light beam could be seen from a distance of 15 miles. The light source consisted of six oil lamps and two reflectors. The light source was converted to electric lamps in 1913. The power of the lamp was increased in 1931. The new lamp had a range of 26 nautical miles. It took 36 seconds for one full rotation of the beam.

== Photographs ==
Old Lighthouse Pondicherry - after renovation

Old LightHouse Plaque

== See also ==
- List of lighthouses in India
- Mahe Lighthouse
