= Chemmankadavu =

Town in Kerala, India

Chemmankadavu is located in Kodur Panchayat of Malappuram district, Kerala state, India. The town is on Kolathur (Chattiparamb- Padapparamba) Road and about 4 km from the Malappuram Town. The Chemmankadavu junction has roads to Ottathara on Right and to Mundakkode through Cholakkal. The village Office, Post office are situated in the Chemmankadavu Town. GMUP School and PMSAM Higher Secondary School are also here. Ashwas_ Centre run by Kodur Charitable Trust function here.
