= Valavil =

Valavil is an enclave in the Mahe district of Puducherry and a part of the Mahé municipality.
