= Choodikotta =

Enclave in Mahe district, Puducherry, India

Coordinates: 11.698°N 75.541°E

Choodikotta is an enclave in the Mahe district of Puducherry and a part of the Mahé municipality.
