= Cherukallayi =

Village in India

Coordinates: 11.709°N 75.530°E

Cherukallayi is a revenue village which forms part of the municipality of Mahe in Puducherry, India.

== Geography ==
Cherukallayi Kunnu is a hill that is located on Mount Veera. Parts of Mahe can be seen from the hill's peak.

Kallai Pandakkal road passes through Cherukallayi, connecting it to one of the national highways in the union territory of Puducherry.

== Notable places ==
- St. George Fort, built during the French period, is located at the top of Cherukallayi Kunnu. Being a private place, anyone visiting may need proper permission to enter.
- A terrestrial relay antenna belonging to Doordarshan (by way of its parent Prasar Bharati) is also located at the hill's peak.
