= Parakkal =

Parakkal is an enclave in the Mahe district of Puducherry, India, and a part of the Mahé municipality.
