= Palakkal =

Palakkal Palissery
- town
- Location in Kerala, India
- Coordinates: 10°28′15″N 76°12′40″E
- Country: India
- State: Kerala
- District: Thrissur

Government
  - Body: Avinissery Grama Panchayath, Paralam Grama Panchayath, Thrissur Corporation

Languages
  - Official: Malayalam, English
- Time zone: UTC+5:30 (IST)
- PIN: 680027
- Vehicle registration: KL-8
- Nearest city: Thrissur
- Lok Sabha constituency: Thrissur

Palakkal is a ward of Thrissur district in the state of Kerala in south India. It is a suburb located about 6 km from Thrissur City. The main center of Palakkal is Palakkal market stop, where the St. Mathews church is situated. It is on the route between Thrissur and Kodungallur.
