= Mahé, India =

Town in Puducherry, India

Mahé Mayyazhi
- Municipality in Puducherry
- Location of Mahe surrounded by Kerala Mahé (India)
- Coordinates: 11°42′4″N 75°32′12″E
- Country: India
- Region: Puducherry
- District: Mahé

Government
  - Type: Municipality
  - Body: Mahé Municipality (Mairie de Mahé)

Area
  - Total: 10 km^{2} (3.9 sq mi)

Population (2011)
  - Total: 41,816 (approx)
  - Density: 4,646/km^{2} (12,030/sq mi)

Languages
  - Official: Malayalam
  - Additional: English, French
- Time zone: UTC+5:30 (IST)
- PIN: 673 310
- Telephone code: 91 (0) 490
- Vehicle registration: PY-03
- Sex ratio: 1,000 ♂/1,184♀
- Literacy: 97.87%
- Vidhan Sabha constituency: 1
- Climate: Tropical monsoon climate (Köppen)
- Website: mahe.gov.in

Mahé (English: /mɑːˈheɪ, ˈmɑːhiː/, French: [mɑˈe]), also known as Mayyazhi (Malayalam: [mɐjːɐɻi]), is a municipality and small town in the Mahe district of the Puducherry Union Territory. It is situated at the mouth of the Mahe River and is surrounded by the State of Kerala. The district of Kannur surrounds Mahe on three sides and Kozhikode district on one side.

Formerly part of French India, Mahe now forms a municipality in Mahe district, one of the four districts of the Union Territory of Puducherry. Mahe has one representative in the Puducherry Legislative Assembly.

== Etymology ==
The name Mahe derives from Mayyazhi, the name given to the local river and region in the Malayalam language. The original spelling found on French documents from the early 1720s is Mayé, with Mahe and Mahie also found on documents, maps and geographical dictionaries until the early 19th century when the spelling Mahe became the norm. Therefore, the belief that the name of the town was given in honour of Bertrand Francois Mahe de La Bourdonnais (1699–1753), whose later fame derived in good part from his association with India, including his capture of Maye in 1741, is incorrect.

Another claim that the spelling Mahe was officially adopted by the leader of the expedition that retook the city in 1726 in recognition of La Bourdonnais' role at the time is also unlikely. It is probable that the resemblance of Maye not to mention Mahe, with La Bourdonnais' family name prompted later generations to assume that the famous Frenchman was somehow directly or indirectly associated with the name to the town or the spelling of the name.

== History ==
Before the arrival of European trading companies to the Indian subcontinent, this area was part of Kolathu Nadu which comprised Tulu Nadu, Chirakkal and Kadathanadu. The French East India Company constructed a fort on the site of Mahe in 1724, in accordance with an accord concluded between André Mollandin and Raja Vazhunnavar of Vatakara three years earlier. In 1741, Mahe de La Bourdonnais retook the town after a short period of occupation by the Marathas.

In 1761, the British captured Mahe and the settlement was handed over to the Rajah of Kadathanadu. The British restored Mahe to the French as a part of the 1763 Treaty of Paris. In 1779, the Anglo-French war broke out, resulting in the French loss of Mahe. In 1783, the British agreed to restore to the French their settlements in India, and Mahe was handed over to the French in 1785.

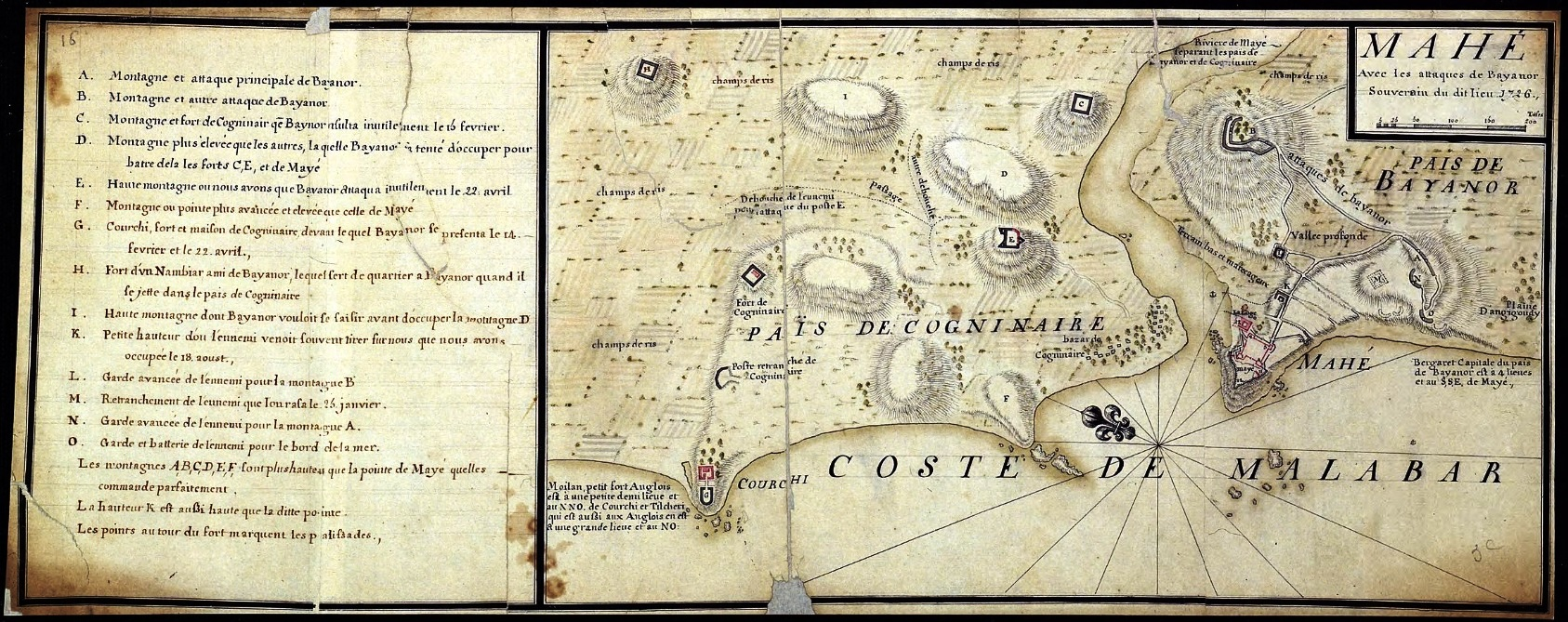
Mahe in 1726. Map made after taking possession of the place and the war against the Indian king of the region supported by the British.

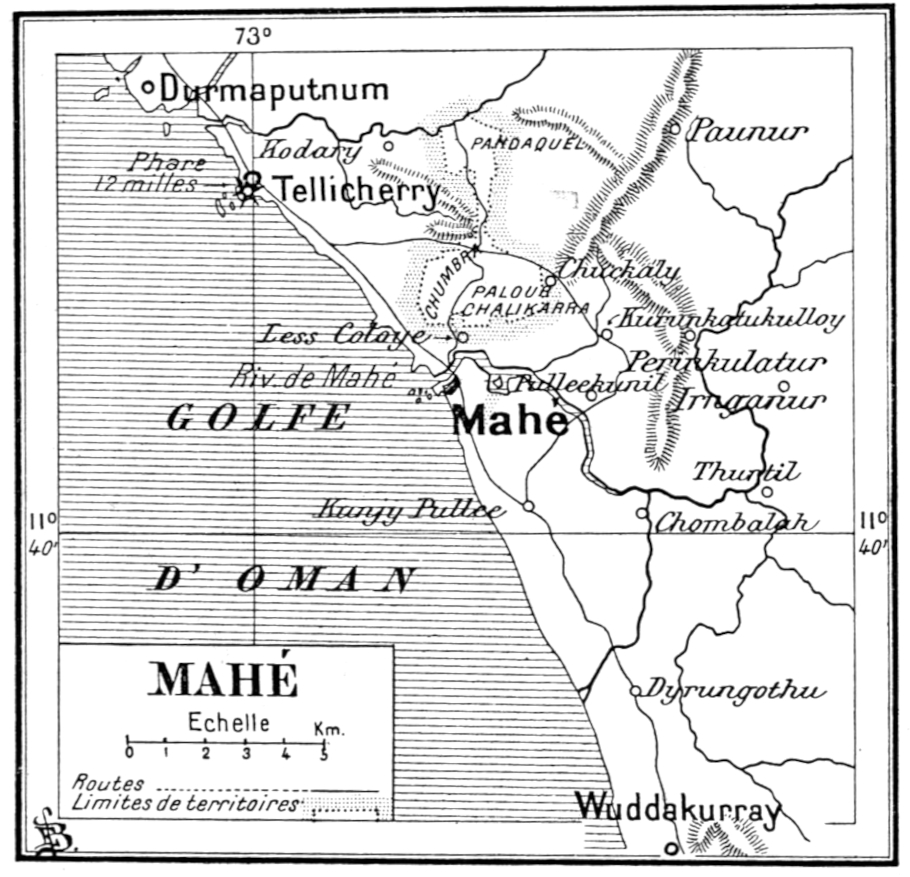
Map 1900.

On the outbreak of the French Revolutionary Wars in 1793, a British force under James Hartley captured Mahe. In 1816, the British restored Mahe to the French as a part of the 1814 Treaty of Paris, after the conclusion of the Napoleonic Wars. Mayyazhi remained under French jurisdiction as a small French colony, an enclave within British India, during the long span that began in 1816. After the independence of India the area continued to be French-ruled until 13 June 1954, when a long anti-colonial struggle culminated in its joining the Indian Union.

After the French left, Mahe became a district of Puducherry Union Territory. The area of Mahe begins from Mayyazhi Puzha in the north to Azhiyoor at the south. Mahe consists of Mahe town and Naluthara, which includes four villages: Pandakkal, Pallur, Chalakara and Chembra. The ruler of Kingdom of Mysore from the 1760s, Hyder Ali (ca 1722–1782), gifted Naluthara to the French as a token of appreciation for the assistance they provided in the war.

=== Liberation of Mahe ===
Gandhians like I. K. Kumaran led the struggle for union with India in Mahe after Indian independence in 1947. The municipal office of the French administration was attacked on 21 October 1948 at 9:00 PM. The French national flag was removed and the Indian national flag was hoisted on the municipal building (Mairie in French). On 26 October, a French navy ship anchored in Mahe and the French regained control of Mahe. The ship left Mahe on 31 October. Communists tried to capture Cherukallayi enclave in April 1954. Two Indians were killed during the struggle. The Indian flag was hoisted in the Naluthura enclave on 1 May. The freedom fighters conducted an embargo on Mahe from June that year. On 14 July 1954, the Mahajanasabha organized a march into Mahe, which was liberated on 16 July 1954.

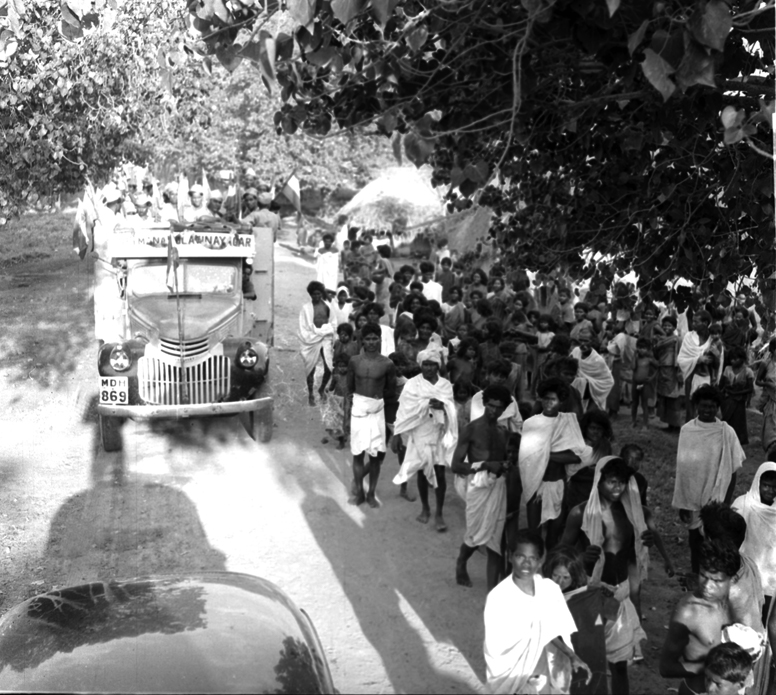
Freedom fighters in Mahe, 1954

== Demographics ==
As of the 2011 India census, Mahe had a population of 41,816, predominantly Malayalis. Males constitute 46.5% of the population with Females constituting the remaining 54.5%. Mahe has an average literacy rate of 97.87%; male and female literacy were 98.63% and 97.25%, respectively. Both the Sex ratio (1184 females per 1000 male) and the literacy rates in Mahe are relatively higher compared to the rest of the nation. The national Sex ratio is 940 females per male and the literacy rate is at 74.04 per cent.

In Mahe, 10.89% of the population consists of children under six years of age. In the 2011 census, the overall child sex ratio was 978 girls per 1000 boys compared to the previous figure of 910 girls per 1000 boys in the 2001 census data. In 2011, children under 6 formed 10.89 percent of Mahe District compared to 11.34 percent in 2001. There was an overall net decrease of 0.45 percent between 2001 and 2011.

The share of Hindus in the population is 66.8% (27,940) and Muslims are 30.7% (12,856) as per the 2011 census of India. Christians account for 2.29% (958) of the population.

=== Locationwise distribution ===
- Mahe 10630
- Chalakara 6855
- Pandakal 8944
- Palloor 14250
- Cherukallayi 1255

== Culture ==
The culture and geography of this area are like almost all of those in the Malabar Coast of Kerala. There are only very few French language speakers in the town (fewer than 100). Only a few influences of French remain in the area. These are mostly reflected in architecture and a few old buildings.

The major festivals of this region are Vishu, Christmas , Onam and Eid. The major language is Malayalam. The population also includes Arabic speakers. The major religion is Hinduism, practised by 66.8% of the populace.

The few places that upheld the rich French culture once prevalent in the area are:

- St. Teresa's Shrine, Mahe (built in 1736)
- Statue of Marianne commemorating the French Revolution (situated in Tagore Park)
- The Government House
- The River Walk
- Mahe Lighthouse
- The St. George Fort in Cherukallayi

== Climate ==
Mahe has a tropical monsoon climate (Köppen Am), typical for the Kerala and Karnataka coast. There is a dry season from December to March, but the location on the windward side of the Western Ghats means that during the westerly monsoon season the region receives exceedingly heavy rainfall, reaching up to 1,080 millimetres or 43 inches in July.

Climate data for Mahe, Puducherry, India
Month	Jan	Feb	Mar	Apr	May	Jun	Jul	Aug	Sep	Oct	Nov	Dec	Year
Mean daily maximum °C (°F)	31.6 (88.9)	32.0 (89.6)	33.0 (91.4)	33.2 (91.8)	32.7 (90.9)	29.6 (85.3)	28.3 (82.9)	28.7 (83.7)	29.5 (85.1)	30.4 (86.7)	31.0 (87.8)	31.4 (88.5)	31.0 (87.8)
Mean daily minimum °C (°F)	21.8 (71.2)	22.9 (73.2)	24.6 (76.3)	25.8 (78.4)	25.7 (78.3)	23.9 (75.0)	23.4 (74.1)	23.6 (74.5)	23.7 (74.7)	23.8 (74.8)	23.3 (73.9)	22.0 (71.6)	23.7 (74.7)
Average rainfall mm (inches)	3 (0.1)	4 (0.2)	13 (0.5)	76 (3.0)	295 (11.6)	905 (35.6)	1,083 (42.6)	539 (21.2)	274 (10.8)	237 (9.3)	106 (4.2)	22 (0.9)	3,557 (140)
Source: Climate-Data.org

== Transport ==
Mahe’s nearest airport is the recently commenced Kannur International Airport, Mattanur, at a distance of 40 kilometres (25 miles). The next nearest airport is the Kozhikode International Airport, Karipur, at a distance of 85 kilometres (53 miles).

The nearest Railway Station is Mahe railway station, where a few local and express trains stop. The nearest major railway stations, where several long-distance trains stop, are Thalassery, Kannur, Mangalore and Vatakara.

There are a few Puducherry Road Transport Corporation buses that operate in Mahe. Otherwise, the bulk of public transport, including private buses based in Malabar and auto rickshaws, is managed by the Kerala State Road Transport Corporation.

== Administration ==
Mahe municipality is the seat of the local administration of Mahe. The Mahe municipal area comprises 9 square kilometres (3.5 square miles) with one Assembly Constituency, i.e. Mahe. The municipal council was established in 1978. The Regional Administrator or Regional Executive Officer is used to exercise the power of the chairman and Vice-Chairman in the capacity of Special Officer of Mahe Municipal Council. Civic elections were held during 2006 after nearly 30 years. Based on the elections, the chairman and 15 councillors of Mahe Municipality were sworn in.

=== Divisions ===
Mahe Pocket

1. Mahe Town (Parakkal, Choodikotta, Manjakkal, Valavil, Mundock)

Cherukallayi Pocket

1. Cherukallayi

Naluthara Pocket

1. Chalakkara (Chalakkara South and a part of Chalakkara North)
2. Chembra (A part of Chalakkara North)
3. Palloor
4. Edayilpeedika (a narrow strip of land between Palloor and Pandakkkal, often considered as a part of Pandakkal)
5. Pandakkal

=== Wards ===
Mahe Municipality consists of 15 wards.

Mahe Pocket

1. Mundock
2. Manjakkal
3. Choodikotta
4. Parakkal
5. Valavil

Cherukallayi Pocket

1. Cherukallayi

Naluthara Pocket

1. Pandakkal North
2. Pandakkal Central
3. Pandakkal South (including Edayilpeedika)
4. Palloor North-East
5. Palloor North-West
6. Palloor South-West
7. Palloor South-East
8. Chalakkara North (including Chembra)
9. Chalakkara South

== Education ==
Mahatma Gandhi Government Arts College, Mahe, was established in 1970 by I. K. Kumaran. The Mahe Co-operative College of Teacher Education was established in 2005 and is part of the Mahe Co-operative Centre for Information Technology Ltd. Other institutions include Mahe Co-operative College of Higher Education & Technology, Mahe Institute of Dental Sciences & Hospital, Rajiv Gandhi Government Ayurveda College, Indira Gandhi Polytechnic College, Mahe and Rajiv Gandhi Govt Industrial Training Institute, Mahe.

The Pondicherry University Community College has a regional centre in Mahe.

There is a Jawahar Navodaya Vidyalaya (JNV Mahe) at Pandakkal. There are four higher secondary schools, three high schools, two middle schools and eight lower primary schools functioning in Mahe. The higher secondary schools are affiliated with the Board of Higher Secondary Education in Kerala and the high schools are affiliated with the state’s Board of Secondary Education. Out of the three high schools, one is a French Medium, the examinations of which are conducted by the Deputy Director of French Education, Govt. of Puducherry.

== Notable people ==
- M. Mukundan, Malayalam novelist and fiction writer.
- M. Night Shyamalan, Indian born American film director and screenwriter.
- I. K. Kumaran, leader of the French Indian Liberation Movement and the first administrator of free Mahe.
- V. N. Purushothaman, the last mayor and the first chairman of the Mahe municipality.

== In popular culture ==
- M. Mukundan's novel Mayyazhippuzhayude Theerangalil (transl. On the Banks of the River Mayyazhi) describes the political and social background of Mahe.
- The 1992 Malayalam feature film Daivathinte Vikrithikal, directed by Lenin Rajendran, based on the novel of the same name by M. Mukundan, is set in the ex-French colony of Mayyazhi (Mahe).

== See also ==
- Mahe (Union Territory Assembly constituency)
- Chandannagar
- French India
- French East India Company
- French people in India
- Indira Gandhi Polytechnic College
- Mahatma Gandhi Government Arts College, Mahe
- Municipal Administration in French India
- Bertrand-François Mahé de La Bourdonnais
- Malabar (Northern Kerala)
- St. Teresa's Shrine
- Treaty establishing De Jure Cession of French Establishments in India
- Yanam

== Image gallery ==
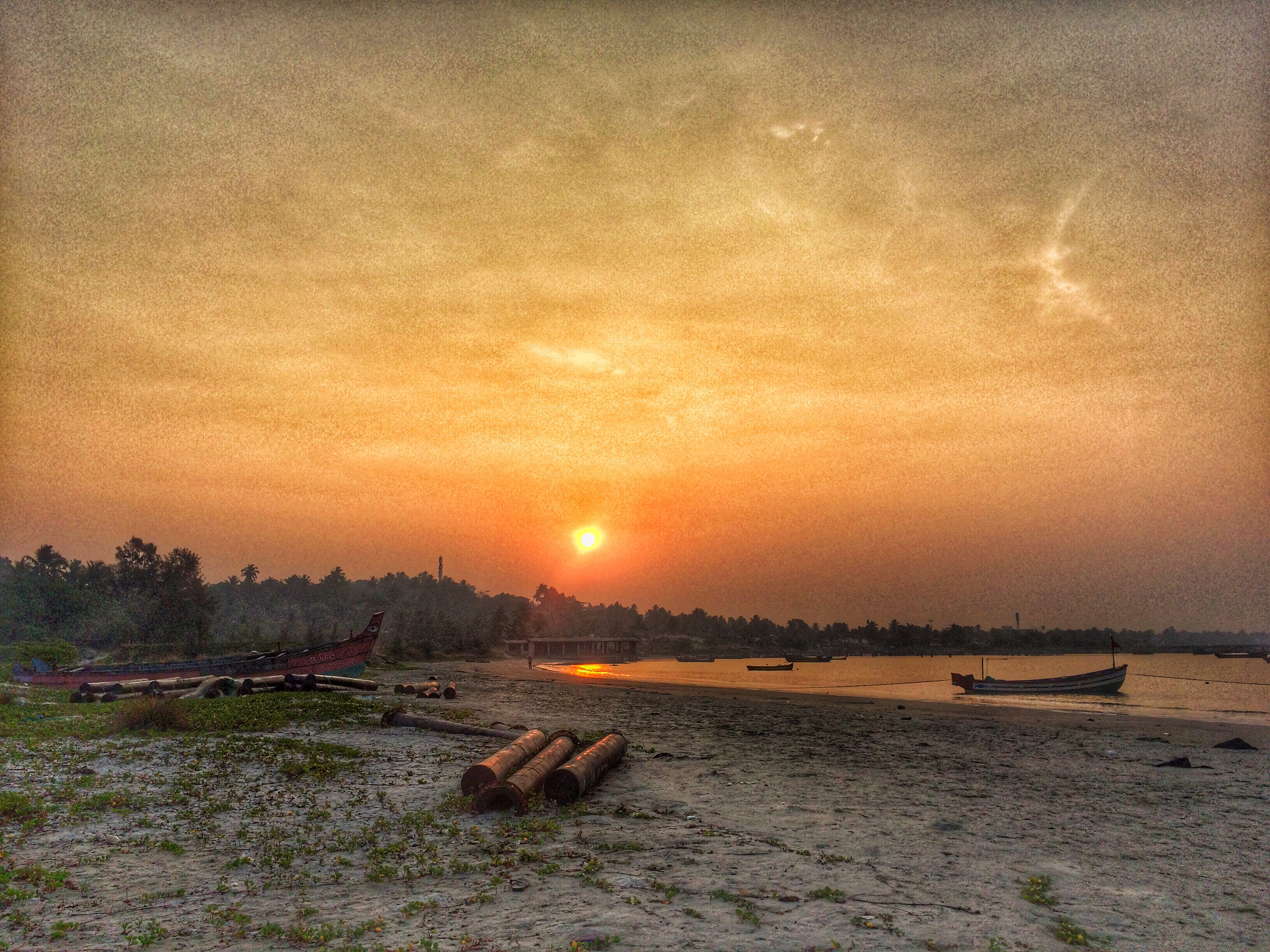
Morning in Mahe

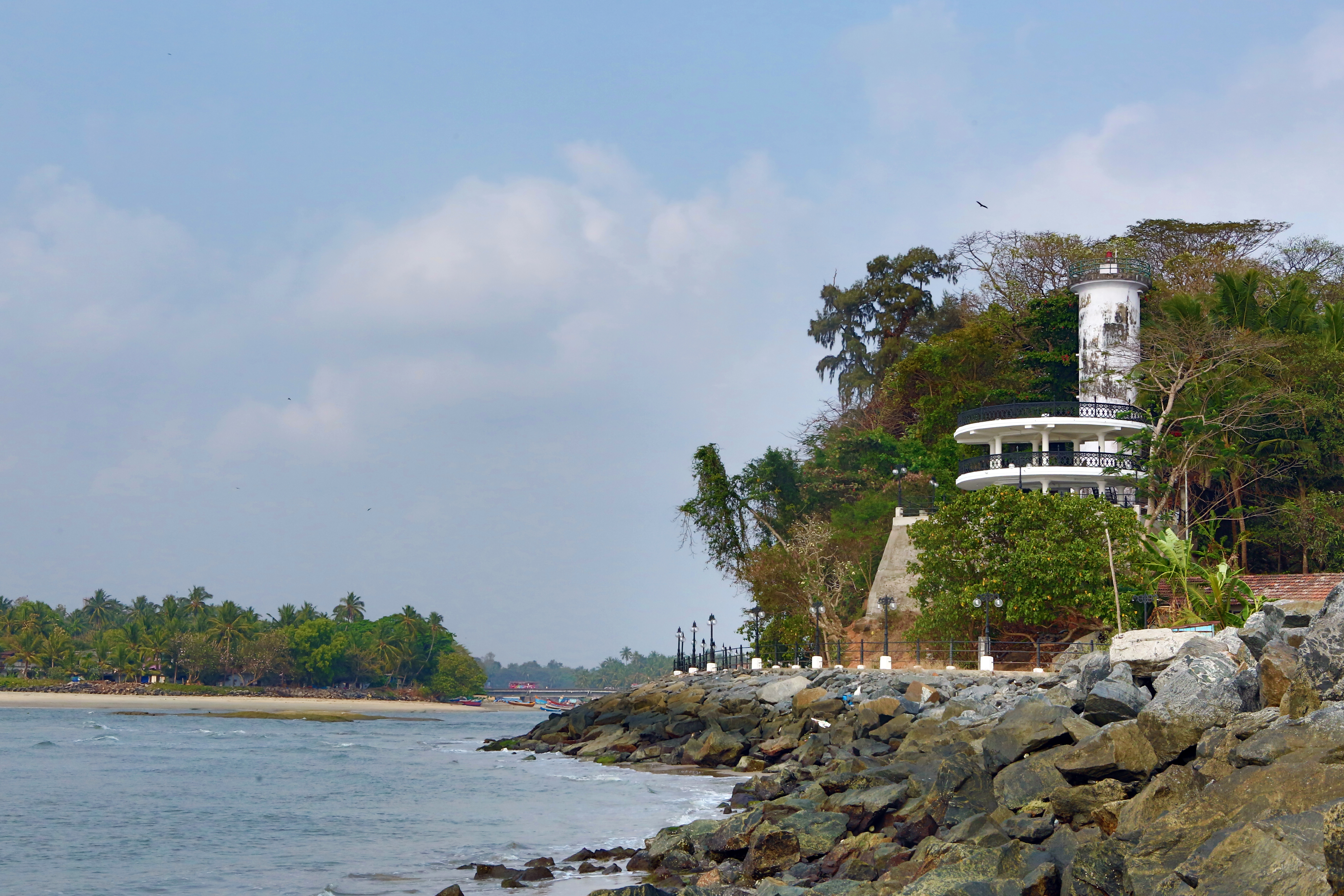
Mahe Light House

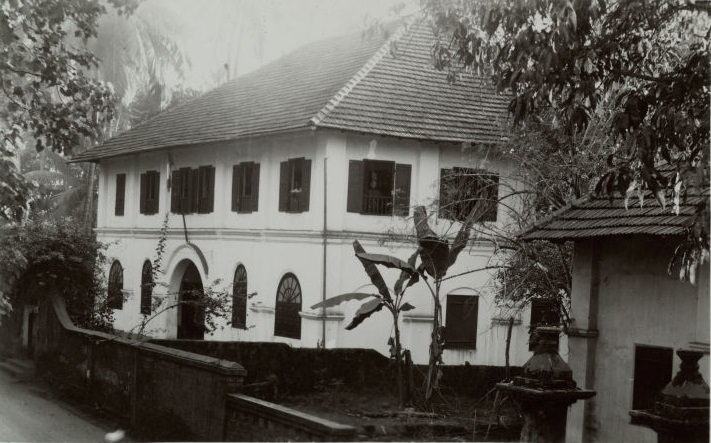
Mahe Town Hall

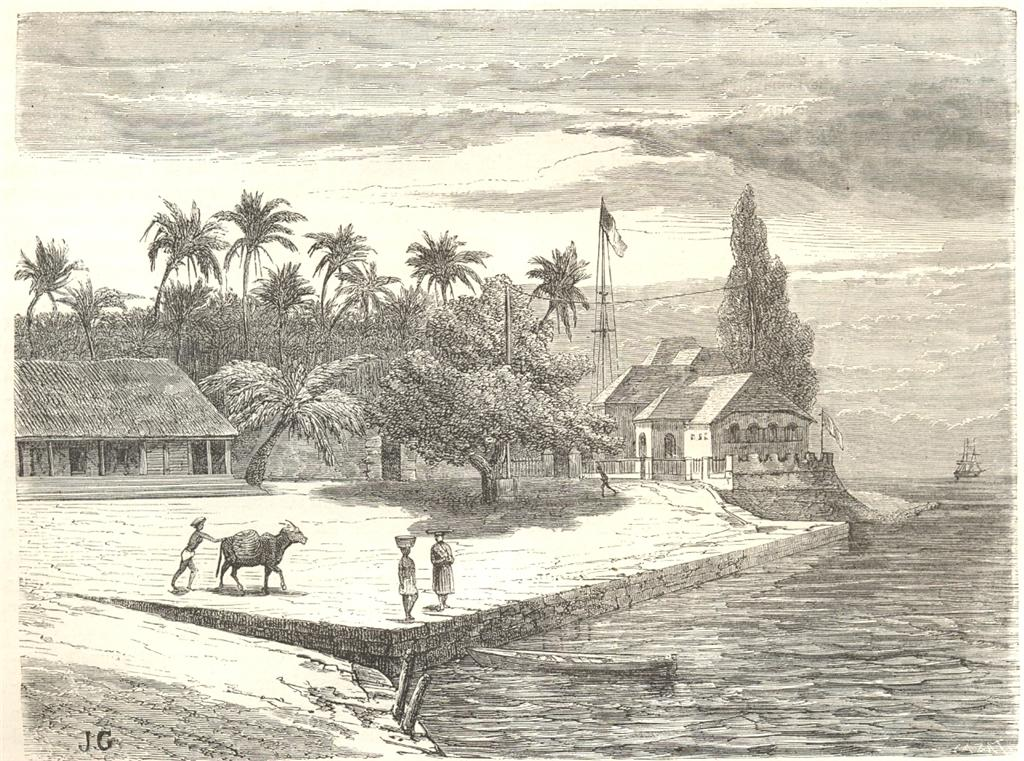
Mahe in 1867

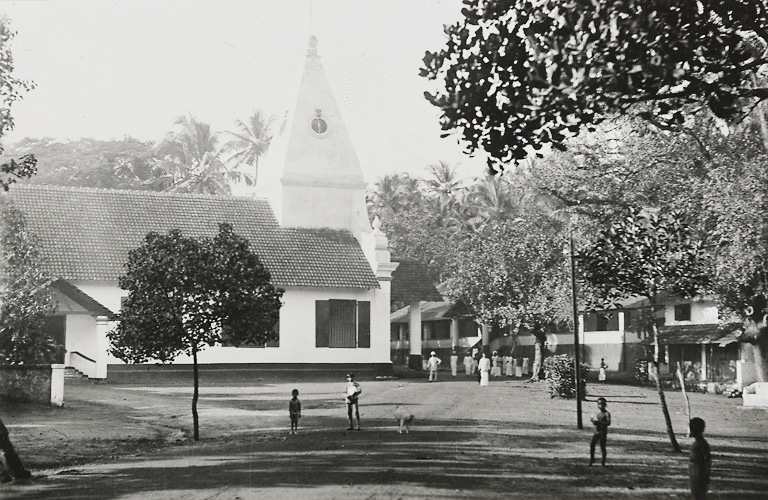
Mahe Church, 1940

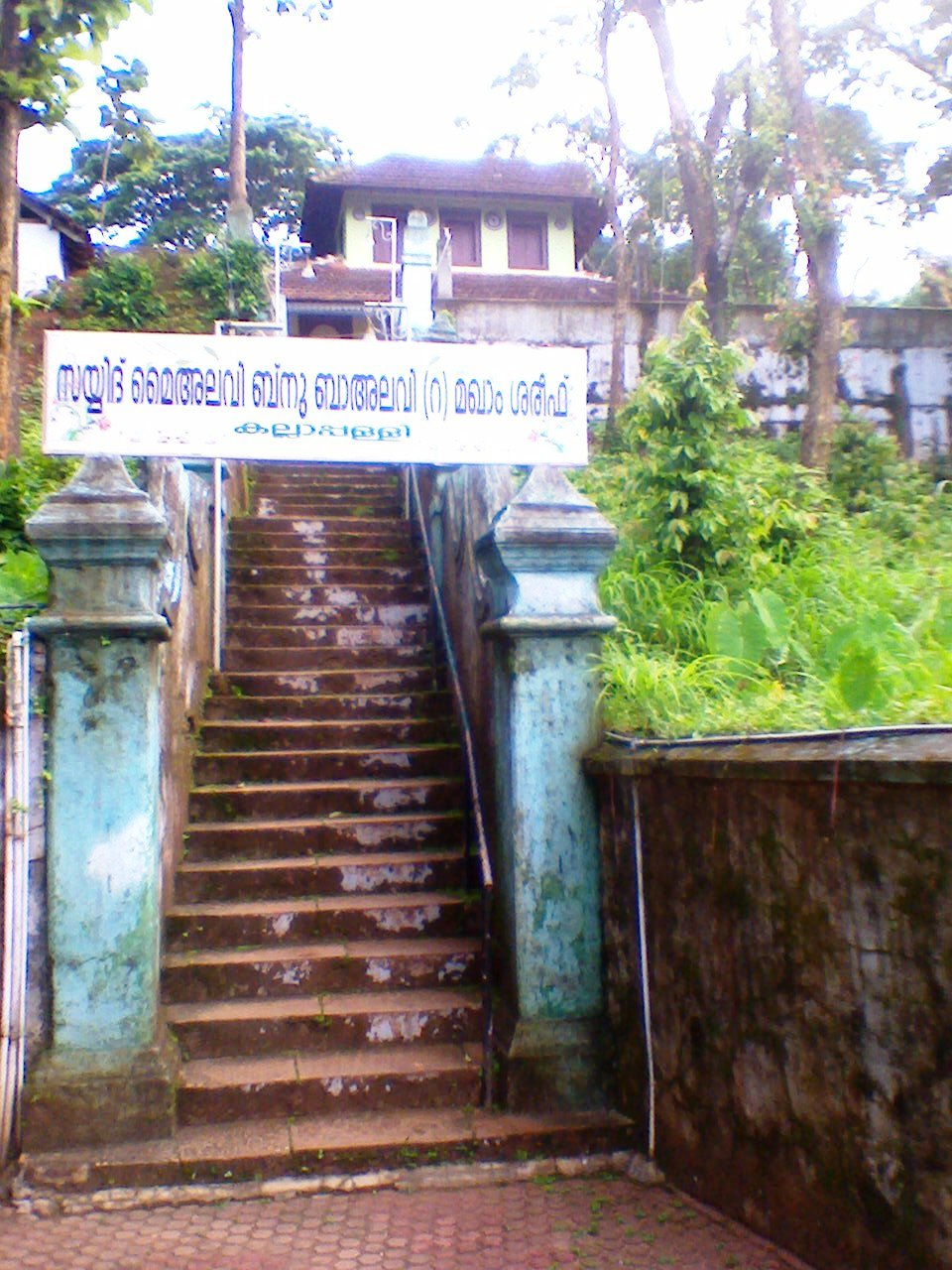
Kallappally Mosque

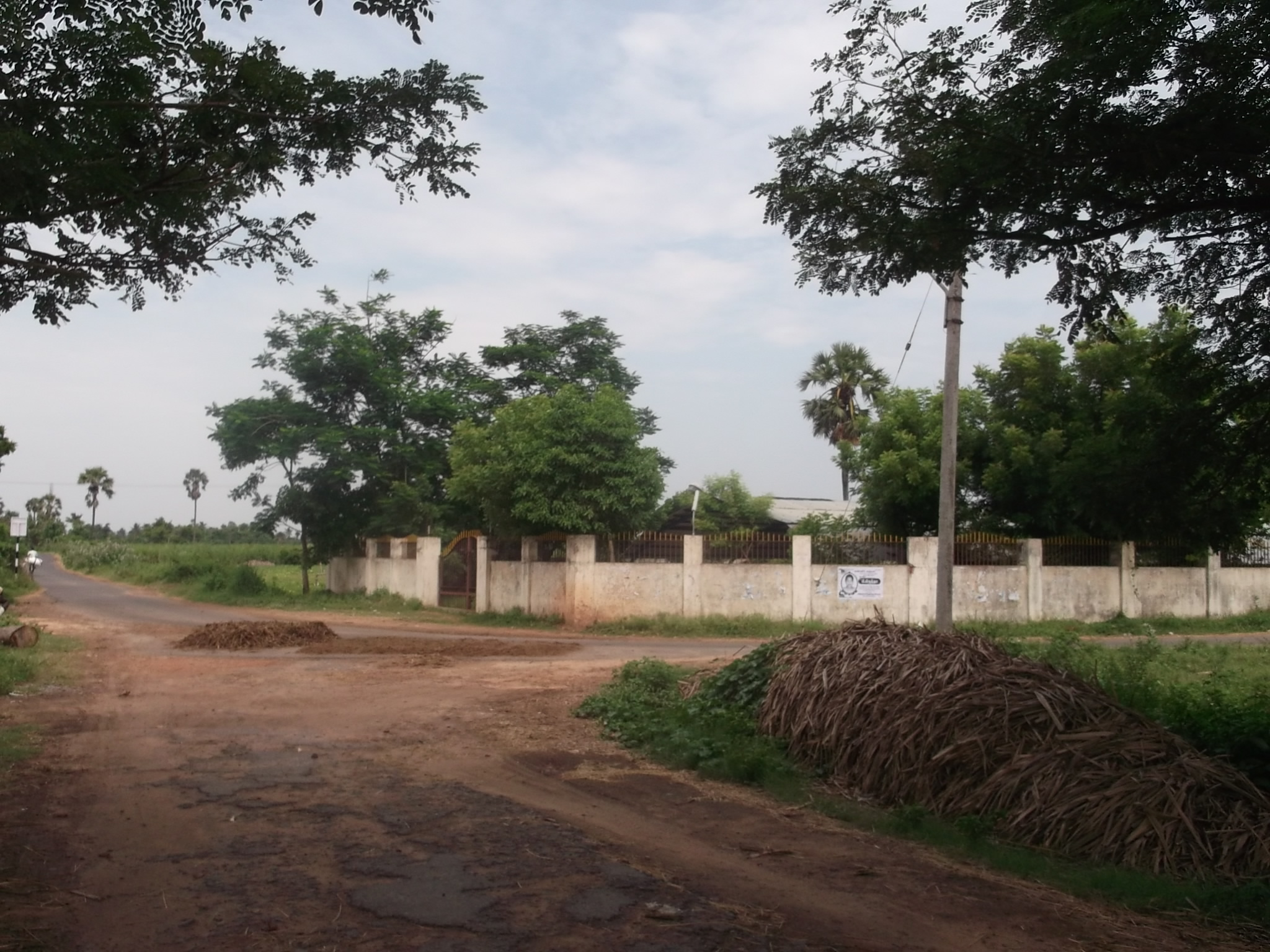
Keezhur Monument

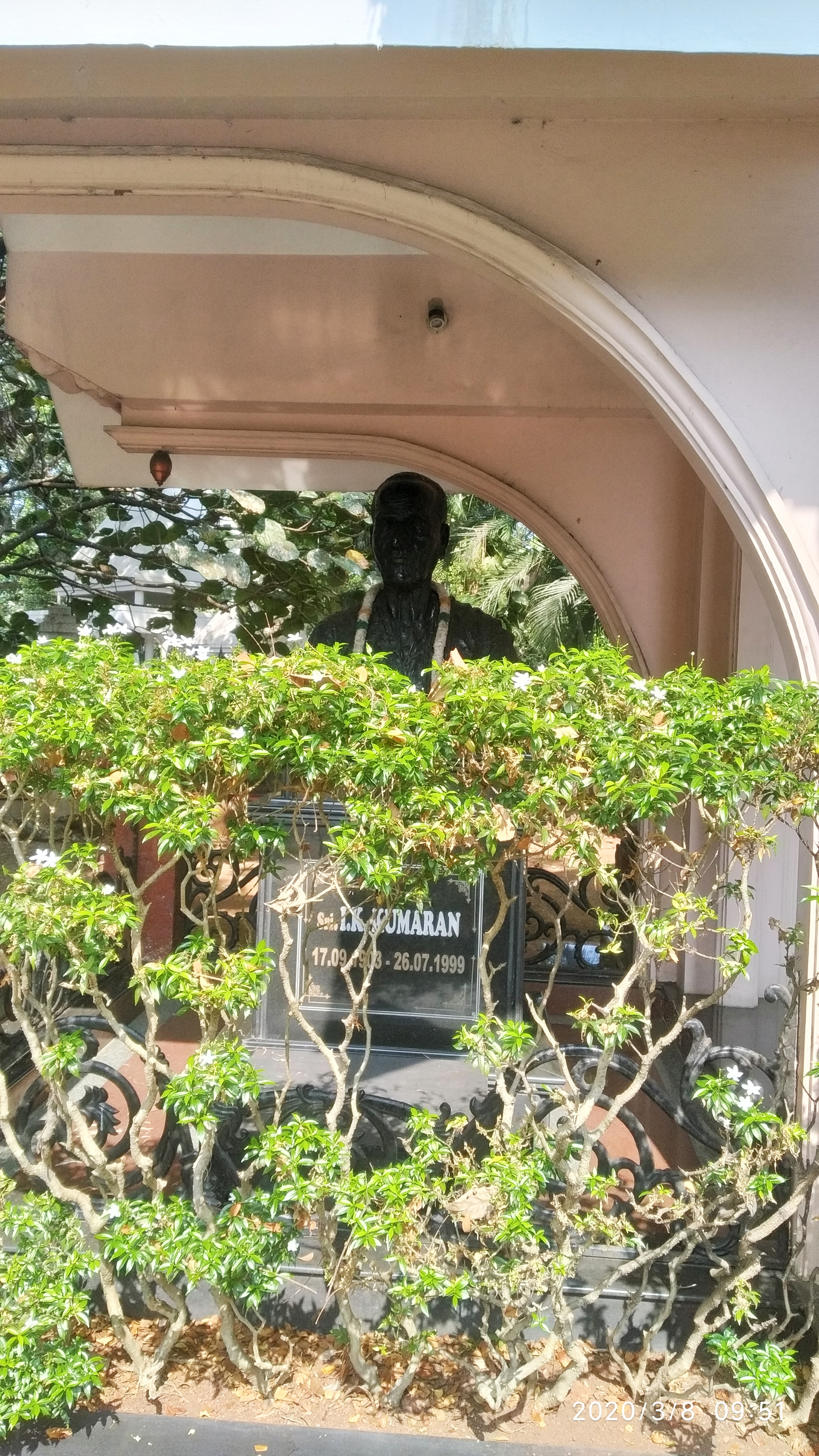
Statue of freedom fighter Kumaran
