= Chembra =

Coordinates: 11.733°N 75.525°E

Chembra is a village situated in Naluthara pocket in Mahé district of Puducherry, India.

It is part of Mahé municipality.
