= Mahatma Gandhi Government Arts College =

Mahatma Gandhi Government Arts College, Mahe
- Motto: Light to Enlighten
- Type: Public
- Established: 1970; 56 years ago
- Affiliations: Pondicherry University
- Principal: Dr. Sivadasan K. K.
- Location: Chalakkara, Mahé, Puducherry, India
- Campus: Urban
- Website: https://mggacmahe.ac.in

Mahatma Gandhi Government Arts College, Mahe (MGGAC Mahe), is a general degree college located in Chalakkara, Mahé, Puducherry. It was established in the year 1970. The college is affiliated with Pondicherry University. This college offers different courses in arts, commerce, and science.

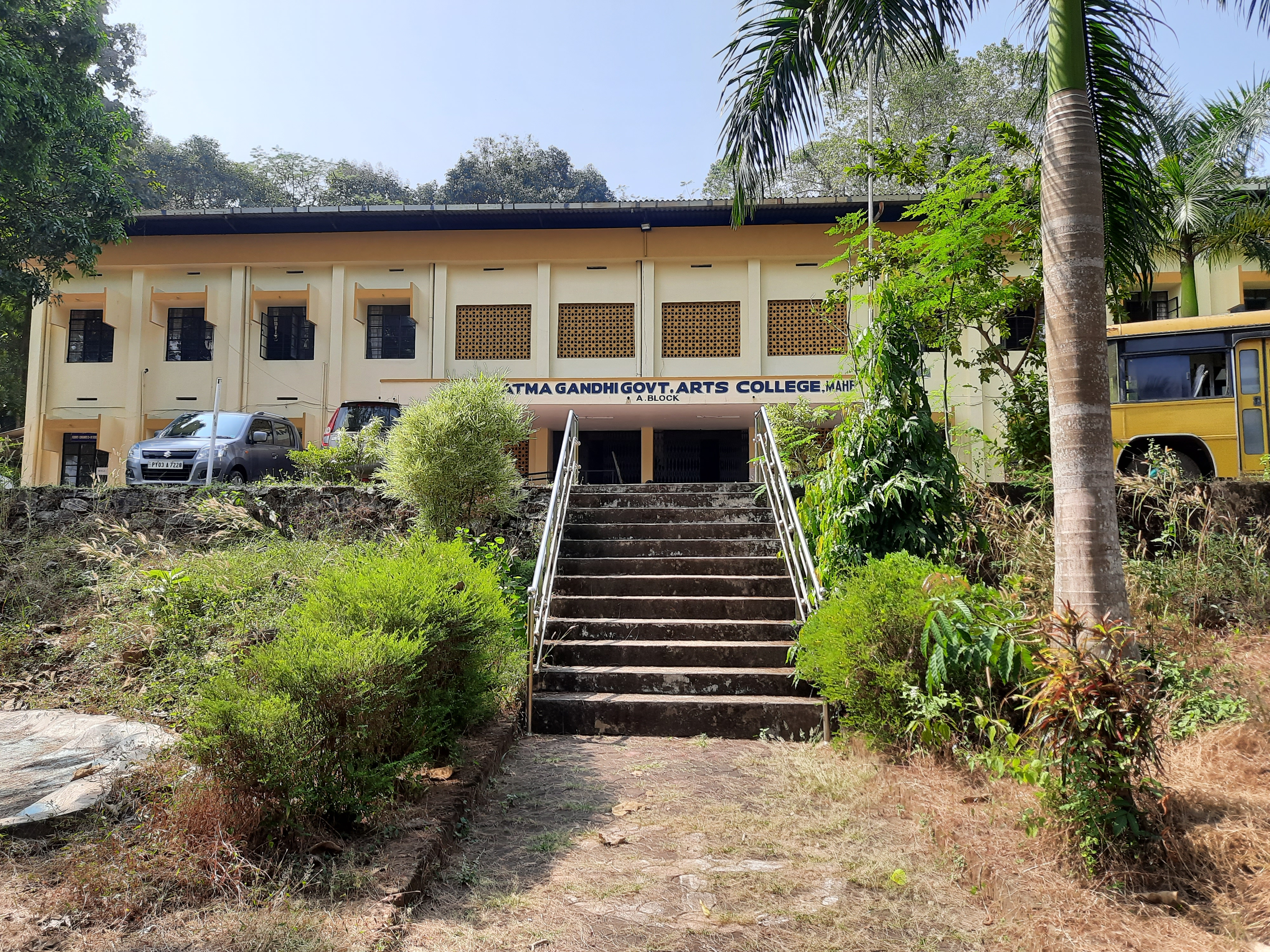
A view of the MGGAC Mahe main block.

== Departments ==
Department of Physics

Department of Chemistry

Department of Mathematics

Department of Zoology

PG Department of Botany

Department of Computer Science

Department of Commerce

Department of Economics

Department of English

PG Department of Hindi

Department of Malayalam

== Accreditation ==
The college is recognized by the University Grants Commission (UGC).

== Notable alumni ==
- Late. Kodiyeri Balakrishnan, Politician, Former Minister of Home Affairs State of Kerala
- Ramesh Parambath, Politician, Member of Puducherry Legislative Assembly
