= I. K. Kumaran =

Indian Politician, Freedom Fighter

Irayi Kunnathidathil Kumaran Master

Administrator of Mahe
- In office 16 July 1954 – 31 October 1954
- Succeeded by: Jejurikkar

Irayi Kunnathidathil Kumaran Master (17 September 1903 – 27 July 1999), was a freedom fighter from Mahe or Mayyazhi, Union territory of India, who fought for liberation from France, in 1954. He also unsuccessfully fought for the unification of Mayyazhi with Kerala. He is known as "Mahe Gandhi". Kumaran was the first Administrator of Mahe after Indian independence.

== Biography ==
Born in Kunnathodam, a fairly wealthy family in Mayyazhi, IK Kumaran's father Kunkan Janmi was a liquor shop owner. The mother sighed. After completing his studies at Basel Mission School and Calve Branch School in Mayyazhi, he passed the school final examination from Thalassery Basel Mission School. He then passed the Intermediate examination from Brennan College, Thalassery.

He passed the exam to become a sub-inspector in British India but was denied a job because he was a French citizen. From 1928 he worked as a teacher at Choodikotta Madrasa and Ottapilakool Mappila School. It was during this period that IK Kumaran became involved in politics at the instigation of Muchikal Padmanabhan. IK Kumaran Master entered the social and political arena through the Youth League movement. He resigned in 1940 to become more active in politics. He later became the President of the Congress Committee in Vadakara. He actively campaigned for the reorganization of the Congress in Kottayam Taluk. He also served as the President of the Youth League for some time. Kumaran Master has made his mark not only in politics but also in various social activities such as untouchability, mixed eating, bhudanam, Harijan upliftment, khadi propaganda and prohibition of liquor.

Mahatma Gandhi Government Arts College, Mahé, was established in the year 1970 by I K Kumaran. The Mahé Co-operative College of Teacher Education was established in 2005 and is part of the Mahé Co-operative Centre for Information Technology Ltd.

== Liberation Movement ==
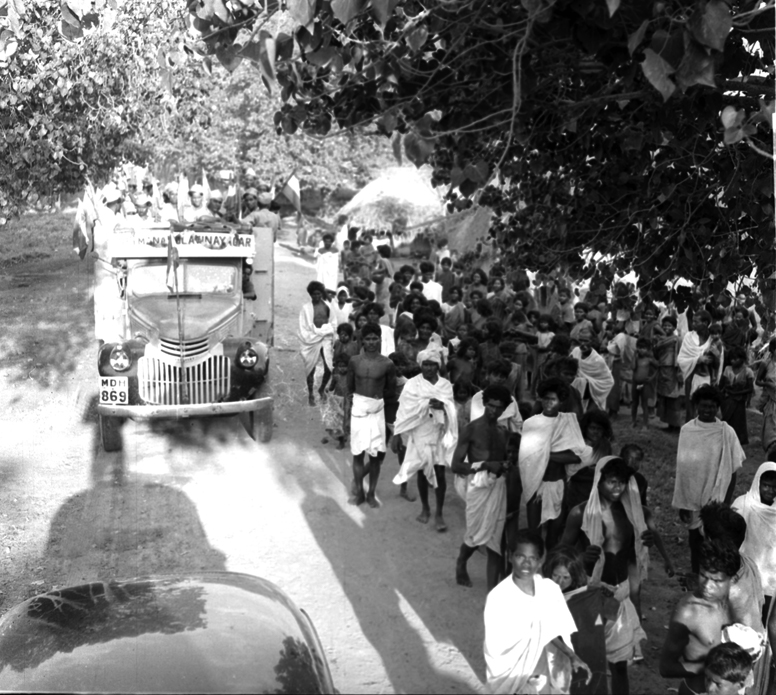
Freedom fighters in Mahé, 1954

Gandhians like I. K. Kumaran led the struggle for union with India in Mahé after Indian independence in 1947. The municipal office of the French administration was attacked. on 21 October 1948 at 9:00 PM. The French national flag was removed and the Indian national flag was hoisted on the municipal building (Mairie in French). On 26 October, a French navy ship anchored in Mahé and the French regained control of Mahé. The ship left Mahé on 31 October. Communists tried to capture Cherukallayi enclave in April 1954. Two Indians were killed during the struggle. The Indian flag was hoisted in the Naluthura enclave on 1 May. The freedom fighters conducted an embargo on Mahé from June that year. On 14 July 1954, the Mahajanasabha organized a march into Mahé, which was liberated on 16 July 1954.
