= Palloor =

Coordinates: 11.7324°N 75.5395°E

Palloor is a revenue village which forms a part of the Mahe district of Puducherry UT, India. The Pincode is 673310. There is a spinning mill in Palloor, which has been running since the British era.
