= Chalakkara =

Coordinates: 11°44′N 75°32′E

Chalakkara is a revenue village which forms a part of Mahé municipality of Puducherry, India.Chalakara is a hilly area. The Mahe Institute of Dental Science is located in Chalakkara. The famous keezhanthoor temple is also in Chalakkara.

Rajiv Gandhi Ayurveda Medical College (a Government of Puducherry institution) and Mahatma Gandhi Government Arts College is in Chalakkara.
