= Mahe district =

Mahé district Mayyazhi
- District
- District of Mahé
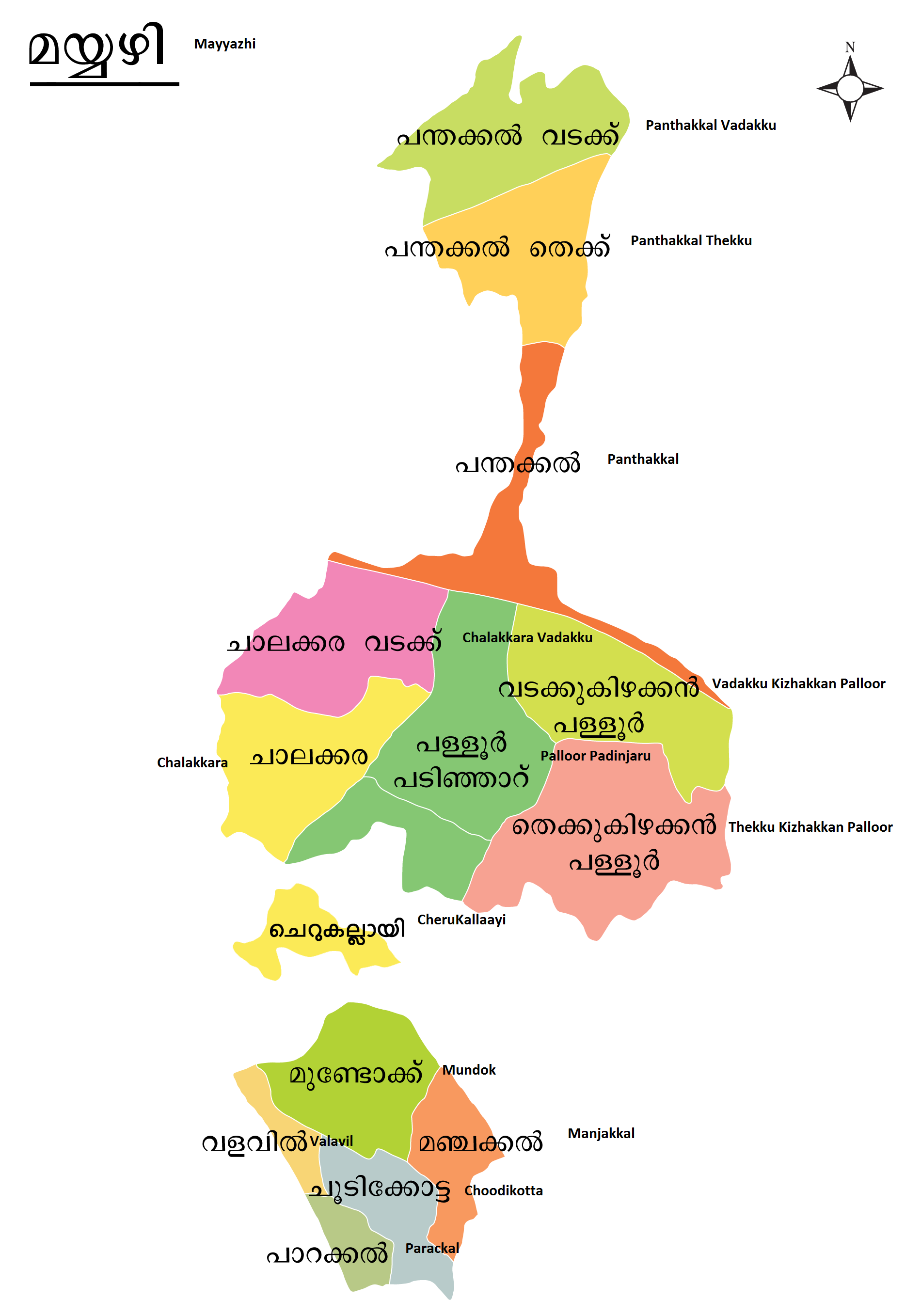
- Map of Mahé showing the names of subdivisions.

- Location within Kerala, India
- Coordinates: 11°42′7.141″N 75°32′9.388″E
- Country: India
- Union territory: Puducherry

Government
  - Regional Administrator: Shivraj Meena, PCS

Area
  - Total: 8.69 km^{2} (3.36 sq mi)
  - Rank: 750th (Smallest in India)
- Elevation: 15 m (49 ft)

Population (2011)
  - Total: 41,816
  - Rank: 635th (out of 640 in 2011)
  - Density: 4,810/km^{2} (12,500/sq mi)
- Demonym: Mahean

Languages
  - Official: Malayalam
  - Additional: English, French
- Time zone: UTC+5:30 (IST)
- PIN: 673310
- Telephone code: +91 490
- Vehicle registration: PY-03
- Website: https://mahe.gov.in/

Mahé district, (/ˈmɑːheɪ/) natively known as Mayyazhi (Malayalam: [mɐjːɐɻi]), is one of the four non-contiguous districts that comprise the union territory of Puducherry, India. It encompasses the entire geographic area of the Mahé region. Mahé is the smallest district in India by total land area, measuring just 8.69 square kilometres (3.36 sq mi).

Geographically positioned along the Malabar Coast, the district functions as a coastal enclave bordered on three sides by Kannur district and on the south by Kozhikode district of the neighbouring state of Kerala. Culturally and historically, the district forms an integral part of the North Malabar region. Due to its small scale, it ranks among the least populous districts in India.

== Geography ==
Mahé district occupies an area of 8.69 square kilometres (3.36 sq mi).

== Demographics ==
According to the 2011 census Mahé district has a population of 41,816, roughly equal to the nation of Liechtenstein. This gives it a ranking of 635th in India (out of a total of 640). The district has a population density of 4,659 inhabitants per square kilometre (12,070/sq mi). Its population growth rate over the decade 2001-2011 was 13.86%. Mahé has a sex ratio of 1,176 females for every 1,000 males, and a literacy rate of 98.35%.

=== Religion ===
Religion in Mahé district (2011)
1. Hinduism (66.8%)
2. Islam (30.7%)
3. Christianity (2.29%)
4. Other or none (0.15%)

Hinduism is the majority religion in Mahé district. Muslims form a significant minority.

Sri Puthalam Bhagavathy Temple in Mahé is an ancient historic temple of Bhagavathi. The legend of the temple relates the events that occurred during the conflict between the French and Indian armies. There is a historic St Theresa Church in Mahé district; it was constructed by the Christian missionary Ignatius A.S. Hippolytes in 1757 as a part of Mahé Mission.

=== Language ===
Languages in Mahé district (2011)
1. Malayalam (98.3%)
2. Tamil (1.14%)
3. Others (0.55%)

According to the 2011 census, Malayalam is the primary spoken language and mother tongue of the vast majority of the population in the district, aligning with its geographical location as an enclave within Kerala. Tamil is spoken by a small minority, primarily due to administrative ties with the Union Territory of Puducherry, alongside minor pockets of other languages including Arabic and English.

== Tourism ==
=== Mooppenkunnu (Hillock) ===
The Mooppenkunnu is a Hillock. It is a Heritage picnic spot in Mahé district. There are pavements to walk, benches to rest and a restroom facility for the tourists. The hillock contains the historic Light House and is a famous sunset view point.

=== Walkway ===
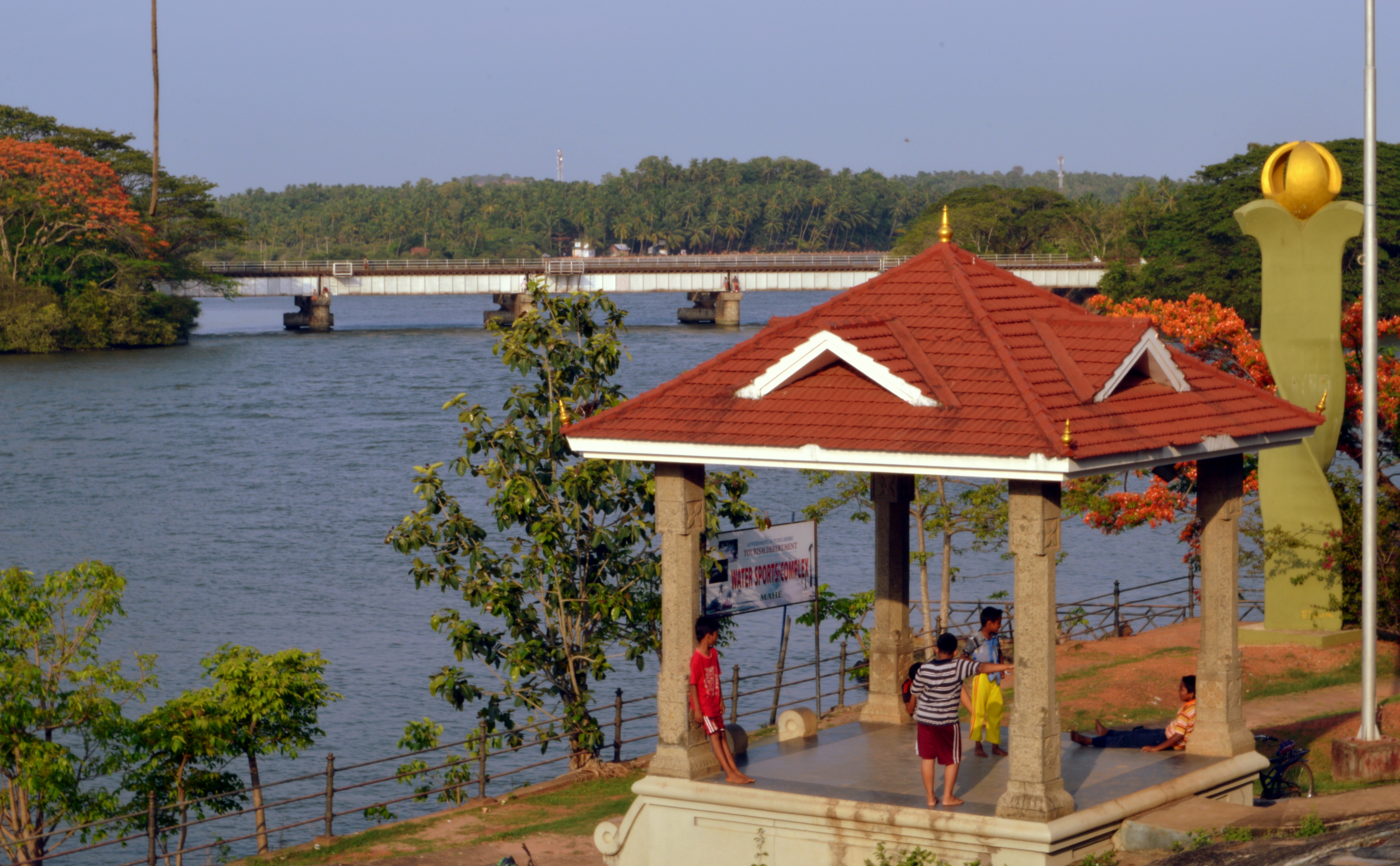

The walkway on the banks of Mahé River is a major tourist attraction. The walkway surrounds around the landscape of the Mahé town. The Walkway has park benches to relax and enjoy the beauty of Mahé River.

=== Azhimukham ===
Azhimukham is the estuary of Mahé River and the Arabian Sea. There is a small Tagore Park situated here. Recently there has been a reconstruction which added a 2 km walkway along the bank of river from the estuary towards Mahé Bridge.

== Notable people ==
- M. Mukundan
- I. K. Kumaran
- V. N. Purushothaman
- M. Night Shyamalan
- Zainuddin Makhdoom II

== See also ==
- Mahé (disambiguation)
- Karaikal district
- Kunhippalli
- North Malabar
- Puducherry district
- Yanam district
