= Purushothaman =

Purushothaman is a surname. Notable people with the surname include:

- Arun Prabu Purushothaman, Indian film director
- D. Purushothaman, Indian politician
- E. Purushothaman, Indian civil servant
- Kamukara Purushothaman (1930 1995), Indian singer
- K. M. Purushothaman, Indian civil servant
- M. K. Purushothaman (died 2013), Indian politician
- Murali Purushothaman, Indian judge
- P. Purushothaman (c. 1948–2019), Indian politician
- Shoba Purushothaman, Malaysian entrepreneu
- Suguna Purushothaman (1941–2015), Indian vocalist
- T. G. Purushothaman (born 1979), Indian footballer
- Vakkom Purushothaman (1928–2023), Indian politician
- V. N. Purushothaman (1909–1990), Indian politician
- Purushothaman Madheshwaran Born 1990, still finding their goles .
