= 1964 Pondicherry Legislative Assembly election =

Indian union territory election

← 1959	23 August 1964	1969 →

All 30 seats to the Puducherry Legislative Assembly 16 seats needed for a majority
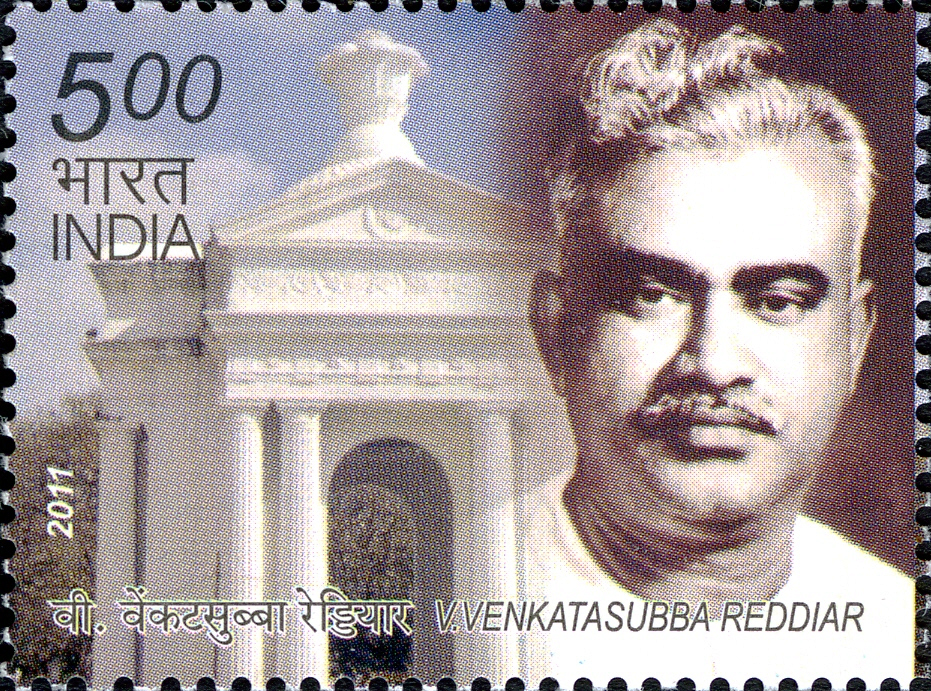

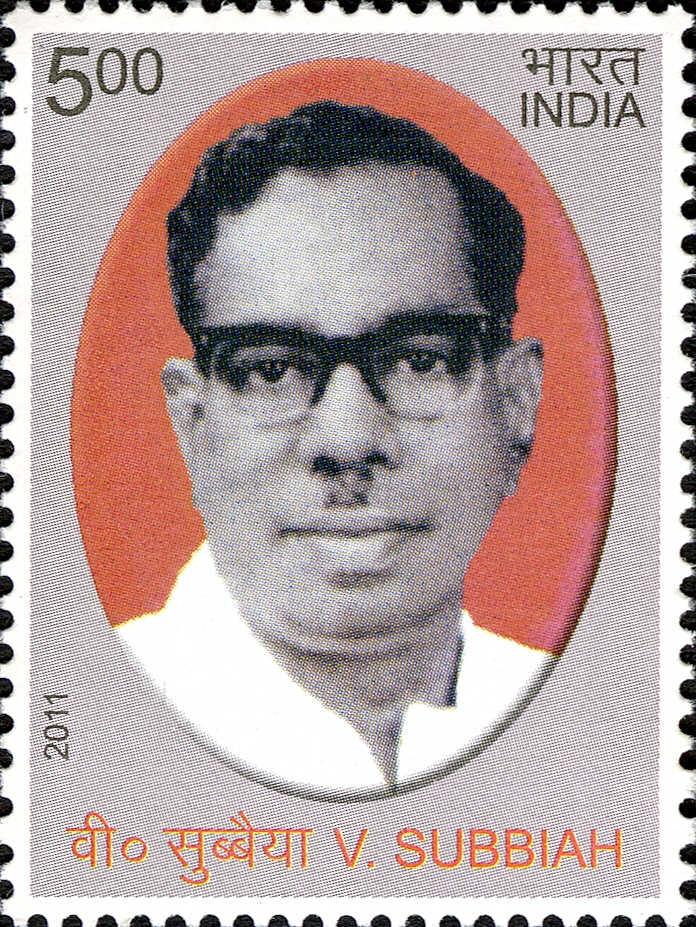
	First party	Second party
Leader	V. Venkatasubba Reddiar	V.Subbiah
Party	INC	People's Front
Leader's seat	Nettapakkam	Murungapakkam-Nainar Mandapam
Last election	21	13
Seats before	21	13
Seats won	22	4
Seat change	▲1	▼9
Percentage	54.3%	13.4%
Swing	▲15.9%	▼15.9%
Chief Minister before election
Edouard Goubert
INC
Elected Chief Minister
V. Venkatasubba Reddiar
INC

Elections to the Legislative Assembly of the Indian Union Territory of Pondicherry took place on 23 August 1964 to constitute the Second Assembly of Pondicherry. These were the first Legislative Assembly elections after the formation of the new Union Territory. The elections marked the end of the rule of Edouard Goubert in Pondicherry.

== Outgoing Assembly ==
The outgoing Legislative Assembly had 39 members (out of whom 25 belonged to the Indian National Congress, 11 to the People's Front (Makkaḷ Munnaṇi (Tamil:மக்கள் முன்னணி), 1 to the Praja Socialist Party and 2 independents).

== Delimitation ==
As per The Union Territories Act, 1963, thirty members would be elected through direct suffrage. Before the Elections to the Pondicherry Legislative Assembly were held in August 1964, the constituencies were delimited by the Delimitation Commission (as per Delimitation Commission Act, 1962) and the entire territory was divided into 30 single-member constituencies-21 for Pondicherry region, 6 for Karaikal region, 2 for Mahe region and 1 for Yanam region. Out of these 5 seats were reserved for Scheduled Castes, four in Pondicherry region and one in Karaikal region.

== Contenders ==
A total of 85 candidates contested the election. Three of the candidates were women (Saraswathi Subbiah of the People's Front, P. Angammal and Padmini Chandrasekaran from the Congress Party).

=== Congress Party ===
In the run-up to the election, there was dissent within the local unit of the Indian National Congress over the nomination of candidates. Until these polls Édouard Goubert had maintained control over the local Congress Party apparatus. Goubert had been pro-colonialist who had switched sides just as French power ended in Pondicherry. He had survived politically through political intrigues and maintaining the image that he could keep the communists from seizing power in the Union Territory. Now a group led by V. Venkatasubha Reddiar challenged his hegemony. Reddiar had been the Minister of Planning in the Pondicherry cabinet since 1954, and enjoyed the support by a sector of contractors and bootleggers. K. Kamaraj, the president of the Congress Party in the Madras State, was called on to heal the split. The Madras State Minister for Industries R. Venkataraman (acting on behalf of the All India Congress Committee) was assigned the task to ensure that the party was reunited for the polls. The AICC wholeheartedly sided with Reddiar. Effectively Goubert's group was marginalised in the process. The Congress Party contested all 30 seat in the election. However, Goubert organised some of his sympathizers to contest as independents. In total there were 38 independent candidates, including Goubert's followers.

=== People's Front ===
Apart from the intra-Congress conflict, the main contender was the communist-led People's Front. The People's Front contested 17 out of the 30 seats.

== Result ==
The Congress Party candidates obtained 91,338 votes (54.3%), the People's Front 30,495 votes (18.2%) and independents gathered 46,218 votes (27.58%). One candidate, Kamishetty Sri Parasurama Vara Prasada Rao Naidu (Congress), was elected unopposed from the Yanam constituency. 17 out of the 22 Congress candidates elected belonged to the Reddiar group, the remaining five were part of the Goubert group. Another three pro-Goubert independents were elected.

Reddiar himself won the Nettapacom seat with 4,965 votes (83.54% of the votes in the constituency). Goubert won the Raj Nivas seat, with 2,722 votes (78.47%) A fourth independent (unaffiliated with Goubert) also emerged victorious. Four People's Front candidates were elected, a result which was seen as a backlash for the communists. Amongst the elected People's Front members was V. Subbiah, who won the Modeliarpeth seat with 3,878 votes (51.80%).

The results of 1964 election were summarized below

Parties and Coalitions	Won	Votes	Vote %	Change
Indian National Congress	22 (Note: One candidate elected uncontested)	91,338	54.3	1
People's Front	4	30,495	31.6	▼9
Independent politician	4	46,218	27.5	▼1

== List of winners ==
Winner, runner-up, voter turnout, and victory margin in every constituency
Assembly Constituency		Turnout	Winner				Runner Up				Margin
#k	Names	%	Candidate	Party	Votes	%	Candidate	Party	Votes	%	Margin
1	Muthialpet	81.41%	P. Shanmugam	INC	1,726	33.06%	Thangaprakasam	Independent	1,429	27.37%	297
2	Kurusukuppam	72.81%	Padmini Chandrasekaran	INC	3,605	53.23%	M. Murugesa Mudaliar	Independent	3,168	46.77%	437
3	Cassicade	71.05%	A. S. Kankeyan	INC	1,799	39.98%	Kuppusamy Mudaliar	Independent	1,182	26.27%	617
4	Raj Bhavan	65.47%	Édouard Goubert	INC	2,722	78.47%	S. Pakiam	Independent	662	19.08%	2,060
5	Bussy	65.11%	C. M. Achraff	Independent	2,367	62.72%	Paul Ambroise	INC	789	20.91%	1,578
6	Oupalam	70.78%	G. Perumal Raja	Independent	3,098	55.47%	D. Munisamy	INC	2,487	44.53%	611
7	Nellithope	72.56%	N. Ranganathan	IPF	3,627	50.11%	R. T. Purushothaman	INC	3,611	49.89%	16
8	Mudaliarpet	82.77%	V. Subbiah	IPF	3,878	51.80%	K. Srinivasan	INC	3,609	48.20%	269
9	Ariankuppam	78.18%	P. Rathinavelu	INC	3,376	48.82%	V. Thulasingam	IPF	3,135	45.34%	241
10	Kuruvinatham	87.87%	K. R. Subramaniya Padayachi	Independent	3,167	47.91%	R. L. Purushothaman	INC	1,760	26.62%	1,407
11	Bahour	79.68%	Thangavel Clamanso	IPF	2,612	49.81%	A. Siva	INC	2,405	45.86%	207
12	Nettapakkam	88.20%	V. Venkatasubba Reddiar	INC	4,965	83.54%	S. Ramaputhiran	Independent	978	16.46%	3,987
13	Thirubuvanai	77.95%	R. Kulandai	Independent	3,698	61.93%	S. Thangavely	Independent	2,273	38.07%	1,425
14	Mannadipet	84.37%	Manickavasaga Reddiar	INC	3,369	51.40%	M. Venugopal	IPF	1,347	20.55%	2,022
15	Ossudu	68.19%	N. Harikrishnan	INC	3,027	55.07%	S. Perumal	IPF	2,470	44.93%	557
16	Villianur	81.30%	Thillai Kanakarasu	INC	4,025	57.70%	M. Abdul Rahiman	IPF	2,518	36.10%	1,507
17	Embalam	79.00%	P. Angammal	INC	4,924	79.83%	S. Andavan	IPF	1,244	20.17%	3,680
18	Oulgaret	79.46%	N. Damodaran	Independent	1,144	18.64%	S. Govindasamy	INC	2,511	40.92%	-1,367
19	Kalapet	79.37%	Jeevarathina Udayar	INC	4,078	58.58%	P. Narayanasamy	IPF	1,555	22.34%	2,523
20	Poudousaram	72.93%	N. Gurusamy	IPF	2,698	46.86%	G. Rajamanickam	INC	2,426	42.14%	272
21	Cotchery	83.69%	G. Nagarajan	INC	4,313	70.34%	S. Sokalingame	Independent	1,614	26.32%	2,699
22	Karaikal North	80.80%	Farook Maricar	INC	4,211	56.39%	M. Sembulingam	Independent	2,033	27.23%	2,178
23	Karaikal South	79.16%	Mohamed Ibrahim Maricar	Independent	2,491	50.70%	Ramassamy Pillai	INC	2,422	49.30%	69
24	Neravy T R Pattinam	86.47%	Nagamuttou Pillai	INC	3,222	56.80%	Ramassamy	Independent	2,163	38.13%	1,059
25	Grand’ Aldee	86.96%	V. M. C. Varada Pillai	INC	3,544	70.58%	Pandarinathan	Independent	1,477	29.42%	2,067
26	Thirunallar	85.64%	Subarayalu	INC	4,000	68.92%	Sathiamourthy	Independent	1,772	30.53%	2,228
27	Nedungadu	86.15%	P. Shanmugam	INC	3,697	65.60%	Maric Paul Andre Alias Paul	Independent	1,939	34.40%	1,758
28	Mahe	90.18%	Valavil Kesavan	INC	2,283	50.14%	I. K. Kumaran	Independent	2,270	49.86%	13
29	Palloor	92.18%	Vanmeri Nadeyi Purushothaman	INC	2,436	64.62%	Poothara Narayanan	Independent	1,334	35.38%	1,102
30	Yanam	-	Kamisetty Parasuram Naidu	INC	Elected Unopposed						

== Election of CM ==
A meeting of the members of Pondicherry Congress Legislature Party to elect its new Leader was held on 31 August 1964. R. Venkatraman, then Minister of Industries, Madras was presentin the meeting as Observer of the AICC. VenkataSubba Reddiar elected was unanimously elected Leader.

== New assembly and cabinet ==
After the election the Congress Party formed a four-member cabinet led by Reddiar. Likewise Reddiar was elected, unanimously, as the leader of the Congress Legislature Party in the new assembly.

== See also ==
- Puducherry Legislative Assembly
- 1955 Pondicherry Representative Assembly election
- 1959 Pondicherry Representative Assembly election
- Second Assembly of Pondicherry
