= P. R. Siva =

Indian politician

Member of Puducherry Legislative Assembly
- In office 2 May 2021 – 2026
- Preceded by: R. Kamalakannan
- Succeeded by: G. N. S. Rajasekaran
- Constituency: Thirunallar

Personal details
- Party: Independent
- Other political affiliations: All India N.R. Congress
- Education: B.A., L.L.B.
- Profession: Advocate

P. R. Siva is an independent politician from India. He was elected as a member of the Puducherry Legislative Assembly from Thirunallar (constituency). He defeated S. Rajasekaran of Bharatiya Janata Party by 1,380 votes in 2021 Puducherry Assembly election.
