= T. K. S. M. Meenatchisundaram =

Indian politician

TKSM Meenatchisundaram

Member of the Puducherry Legislative Assembly
- Incumbent
- Assumed office 2026
- Preceded by: M. Nagathiyagarajan
- Constituency: Neravy T. R. Pattinam

Personal details
- Party: Bharatiya Janata Party
- Profession: Politician

TKSM Meenatchisundaram is an Indian politician from Puducherry. He is a member of the Puducherry Legislative Assembly from Neravy T. R. Pattinam representing the Bharatiya Janata Party.

== Political career ==
Meenatchisundaram won the Neravy T. R. Pattinam seat in the 2026 Puducherry Legislative Assembly election as a candidate of the Bharatiya Janata Party. He received 10,818 votes and defeated M. Nagathiyagarajan of the Dravida Munnetra Kazhagam by a margin of 2,018 votes.
