= Vaiyapuri Manikandan =

Indian politician

Member of the Puducherry Legislative Assembly
- Incumbent
- Assumed office 2026
- Preceded by: J. Prakash Kumar
- Constituency: Muthialpet

Personal details
- Party: All India N.R. Congress
- Profession: Politician

Vaiyapuri Manikandan is an Indian politician and member of the All India N.R. Congress. He was elected as a Member of the Puducherry Legislative Assembly from the Muthialpet constituency in the 2026 Puducherry Legislative Assembly election.
