= C. Aiyappan =

Indian politician

Member of the Puducherry Legislative Assembly
- Incumbent
- Assumed office 2026
- Preceded by: R. Baskar Datchanamourtty
- Constituency: Ariankuppam

Personal details
- Party: All India N.R. Congress
- Profession: Politician

C. Aiyappan is an Indian politician from Puducherry. He is a member of the Puducherry Legislative Assembly from Ariankuppam representing the All India N.R. Congress.

== Political career ==
Aiyappan won the Ariankuppam seat in the 2026 Puducherry Legislative Assembly election as a candidate of the All India N.R. Congress. He received 14,210 votes and defeated D. Vijayalakshmy of the Indian National Congress by a margin of 603 votes.
