= Prodipto Ghosh =

Administrator of Mahe
- In office 9 August 1972 – 7 June 1973
- Preceded by: E. Purushothaman
- Succeeded by: C. A. Balaramasounarin

Prodipto Ghosh was an Indian civil servant and administrator. He was the administrator of Mahe from 9 August 1972 to 7 June 1973.
