= 1969 Pondicherry Legislative Assembly election =

Indian union territory election

- 9 March 1969

30 seats in the Puducherry Legislative Assembly 16 seats needed for a majority
- Registered: 228,754
- Turnout: 81.59%
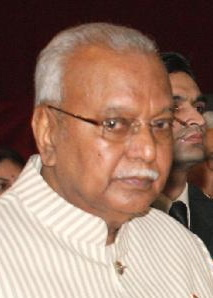

	Majority party	Minority party
Leader	M. O. H. Farook
Party	DMK	INC(R)
Leader's seat	Kalapet
Last election	Did not contest
Seats won	15	10
Seat change	-	▼12
Popular vote	61,717	78,052
Percentage	33.70%	42.62%
Swing	_	▼9.45pp
Chief Minister before election
President's rule
Elected Chief Minister
M. O. H. Farook
DMK

Elections to the Puducherry Legislative Assembly (French: Assemblée législative de Pondichéry) were held in March 1969, to elect members of the 3rd Puducherry Assembly. The Indian National Congress won the popular vote, but the Dravida Munnetra Kazhagam won the most seats, and M. O. H. Farook was appointed as the Chief Minister of Puducherry.

The territory of Pondicherry was delimited by the Delimitation Commission of India into 30 single-member constituencies.

== Results ==
Party	Votes	%	Seats	+/–
Indian National Congress (R)	78,052	42.62	10	▼12
Dravida Munnetra Kazhagam	61,717	33.70	15	New
Communist Party of India	23,115	12.62	3	New
Independents	20,250	11.06	2	▼2
Total	183,134	100.00	30	0
Valid votes	183,134	98.13		
Invalid/blank votes	3,497	1.87		
Total votes	186,631	100.00		
Registered voters/turnout	228,754	81.59		
Source: ECI

== Elected members ==
Winner, runner-up, voter turnout, and victory margin in every constituency
Assembly Constituency		Turnout	Winner				Runner Up				Margin
#k	Names	%	Candidate	Party	Votes	%	Candidate	Party	Votes	%	Margin
1	Muthialpet	83.78%	K. Murugaiyan	DMK	3,290	55.52%	M. Thangapragasam	INC	2,636	44.48%	654
2	Kurusukuppam	76.26%	G. Perumal Raja	DMK	4,068	59.89%	N. Govindaraj	INC	1,550	22.82%	2,518
3	Cassicade	69.48%	P. Ansari Dorasamy	INC	2,721	60.33%	R. Azhwar	CPI	1,409	31.24%	1,312
4	Raj Bhavan	67.81%	D. Kantharaj	INC	1,766	51.62%	S. Sadagopan	DMK	1,655	48.38%	111
5	Bussy	63.87%	C. M. Achraff	DMK	2,336	75.94%	M. J. Vincent	INC	740	24.06%	1,596
6	Oupalam	75.00%	S. Govindarajalu	DMK	2,676	46.59%	K. Karunakaran	Independent	1,730	30.12%	946
7	Nellithope	72.63%	N. Ranganathan	CPI	4,372	57.11%	B. Chandrasekaran	INC	2,759	36.04%	1,613
8	Mudaliarpet	85.10%	Y. Kailasa Surbian	CPI	4,748	62.01%	A. S. Janakipaman	INC	2,909	37.99%	1,839
9	Ariankuppam	84.70%	S. Perumal	DMK	3,774	50.11%	P. C. Purushothaman	INC	3,758	49.89%	16
10	Kuruvinatham	86.08%	K. R. Subramaniya Padayachi	INC	4,050	56.13%	M. Rajagopal	CPI	2,903	40.24%	1,147
11	Bahour	85.99%	K. Krishnasamy	INC	3,211	52.22%	R. Thangavelu Clemanso	CPI	2,938	47.78%	273
12	Nettapakkam	92.09%	D. Ramachandran	DMK	3,545	51.10%	V. Venkatasubba Reddiar	INC	3,393	48.90%	152
13	Thirubuvanai	77.89%	M. Thangavelu	DMK	3,277	51.52%	R. Mannathan	INC	2,338	36.76%	939
14	Mannadipet	88.02%	S. M. Subbarayan	DMK	3,499	50.99%	D. Kannappan	INC	2,315	33.74%	1,184
15	Ossudu	76.28%	V. Nagarathinam	INC	3,386	50.60%	P. S. Perumal	CPI	3,306	49.40%	80
16	Villianur	84.73%	S. Arumugam	DMK	4,132	59.95%	S. V. Murugesa Nadar	INC	2,760	40.05%	1,372
17	Embalam	83.41%	M. Veerammal	INC	3,682	55.69%	M. Veerappan	DMK	2,930	44.31%	752
18	Uzhavarkarai	83.20%	S. Muthu	DMK	3,452	50.15%	G. Rajamanickam	INC	1,823	26.49%	1,629
19	Kalapet	87.21%	M. O. H. Farook	DMK	4,261	59.84%	M. Murugesa Mudaliar	INC	2,860	40.16%	1,401
20	Poudousaram	78.41%	N. Gurusamy	CPI	3,439	53.34%	M. Krishnasamy	INC	2,866	44.45%	573
21	Cotchery	83.34%	M. Balaya	INC	3,097	47.41%	T. Jayaraman	DMK	2,546	38.97%	551
22	Karaikal North	78.59%	M. Jambulingam	INC	4,208	52.07%	A. M. Hameed Maricar	Independent	3,873	47.93%	335
23	Karaikal South	71.71%	Marie Lourdes Silvaradjou	DMK	2,439	50.91%	N. M. Mohamed Yussouf	INC	2,041	42.60%	398
24	Neravy T R Pattinam	89.67%	S. Ramasamy	DMK	3,447	53.88%	M. Kaliappa Naicker	INC	2,951	46.12%	496
25	Grand’ Aldee	85.47%	Y. Pandari Nathan	DMK	3,852	70.82%	G. Muthukrishnan	Independent	1,026	18.86%	2,826
26	Thirunallar	87.91%	R. Supprayalu Naicker	DMK	3,455	54.12%	V. Arunasalam	INC	2,814	44.08%	641
27	Nedungadu	89.87%	P. Shanmugam	INC	3,103	50.16%	A. Savundararangan	DMK	3,083	49.84%	20
28	Mahe	83.50%	I. K. Kumaran	Independent	2,885	59.33%	Valavil Kesavan	INC	1,978	40.67%	907
29	Palloor	82.69%	Vanmeri Nadeyi Purushothaman	INC	2,609	67.64%	Pondeatte Anandin	Independent	1,248	32.36%	1,361
30	Yanam	89.65%	Kamisetty Parasuram Naidu	Independent	2,287	55.56%	Yarra Zagannadharao	INC	1,829	44.44%	458

== See also ==
- List of constituencies of the Puducherry Legislative Assembly
- 1969 elections in India
