= Bahour Assembly constituency =

Constituency of the Puducherry legislative assembly in India

Coordinates: 11.806°N 79.751°E

Bahour
- Constituency No. 23 for the Puducherry Legislative Assembly
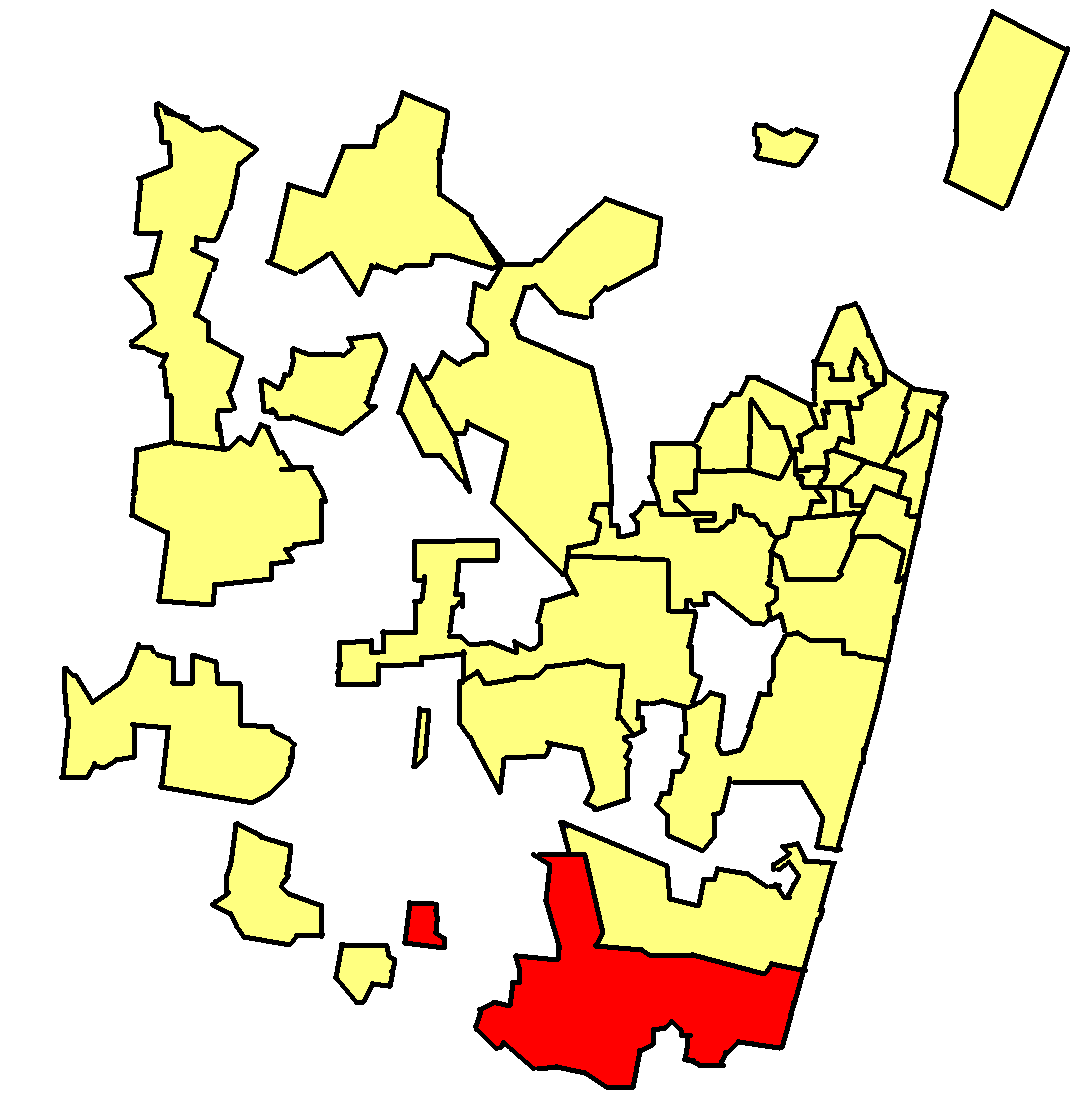

Constituency details
- Country: India
- Region: South India
- Union Territory: Puducherry
- District: Puducherry
- Lok Sabha constituency: Puducherry
- Established: 1964
- Total electors: 29,762
- Reservation: None

Member of Legislative Assembly
- 16th Puducherry Legislative Assembly
- Incumbent R. Senthilkumar
- Party: Dravida Munnetra Kazhagam
- Elected year: 2021

Bahour is a legislative assembly constituency in the Union territory of Puducherry in India. Bahour Assembly constituency is part of Puducherry Lok Sabha constituency.

== Members of the Legislative Assembly ==
Year	Name	Party
1964	Thangavel Clamanso	Indian People's Front
1969	K. Krishnasamy	Indian National Congress
1974	Thangavel Clamanso	Communist Party of India
1977	P. Uthiravelu	Janata Party
1980	P. Uthiravelu	Janata Party
1985	P. Uthiravelu	Janata Party
1990	P. Rajavelu	Janata Dal
1991	P. Rajavelu	Independent politician
1996	M. Kandasamy	Tamil Maanila Congress
2001	P. Rajavelu	Puducherry Makkal Congress
2006	M. Kandasamy	Indian National Congress
2011	T. Thiagarajan	All India N.R. Congress
2016	N. Danavelou	Indian National Congress
2021	R. Senthilkumar	Dravida Munnetra Kazhagam
2026	R. Senthilkumar	Dravida Munnetra Kazhagam

== Election results ==
Vote share of winning candidates
2021	44.56%
2016	44.58%
2011	53.42%
2006	60.06%
2001	48.91%
1996	51.95%
1991	48.63%
1990	57.79%
1985	47.50%
1980	51.40%
1977	45.56%
1974	38.77%
1969	52.22%
1964	49.81%

=== 2026 ===
2026 Puducherry Legislative Assembly election: Bahour
Party	Candidate	Votes	%	±%
DMK	R. Senthil Kumar	10,520	38.32	
AINRC	T. Thiagarajan	8,123	29.59	
TVK	N. Dhanavelou	8,043	29.29	
NOTA	None of the above	147	0.54	
IND	A. Arulprakash	135	0.49	
TMTHK (Note: Tamilaga Makkal Thannurimai Katchi)	G. Sathiyamoorthy	94	0.34	
IND	M. Vengatesan	69	0.25	
PMK	K. Kirubanidhi	49	0.18	
IND	M. Mugilan	11	0.04	
Majority		2,397	8.73	
Turnout		27,456	95.78	
DMK hold		Swing		

=== Assembly Election 2021 ===
2021 Puducherry Legislative Assembly election: Bahour
Party	Candidate	Votes	%	±%
DMK	R. Senthilkumar	11,789	44.56%	
AINRC	N. Dhanavelou	11,578	43.76%	
Amma Makkal Munnettra Kazagam	P. Velmurugan	1,408	5.32%	
Independent	V. Ruthiramoorthy	470	1.78%	
NOTA	Nota	294	1.11%	0.45%
MNM	C. Dinesh	126	0.48%	
Margin of victory		211	0.80%	−10.30%
Turnout		26,456	89.60%	−0.91%
Registered electors		29,527		5.64%
DMK gain from INC		Swing	-0.02%	

=== Assembly Election 2016 ===
2016 Puducherry Legislative Assembly election: Bahour
Party	Candidate	Votes	%	±%
INC	N. Danavelou	11,278	44.58%	0.10%
AINRC	T. Thiagarajan	8,471	33.49%	
AIADMK	P. Velmurugan	3,732	14.75%	
CPI(M)	P. Sivakami	457	1.81%	
PMK	P. Venugopal	257	1.02%	
NOTA	None of the Above	168	0.66%	
Margin of victory		2,807	11.10%	2.16%
Turnout		25,297	90.51%	−2.25%
Registered electors		27,950		12.75%
INC gain from AINRC		Swing	-8.84%	

=== Assembly Election 2011 ===
2011 Puducherry Legislative Assembly election: Bahour
Party	Candidate	Votes	%	±%
AINRC	T. Thiagarajan	12,284	53.42%	
INC	R. Radhakrishnan	10,229	44.49%	−15.57%
Independent	B. R. Sundaramoorthy	315	1.37%	
BJP	Thanga Vikraman	166	0.72%	
Margin of victory		2,055	8.94%	−14.07%
Turnout		22,994	92.76%	1.89%
Registered electors		24,790		21.18%
AINRC gain from INC		Swing	-6.63%	

=== Assembly Election 2006 ===
2006 Pondicherry Legislative Assembly election: Bahour
Party	Candidate	Votes	%	±%
INC	M. Kandasamy	11,164	60.06%	
PMC	P. Rajavelu	6,888	37.05%	
Independent	M. Rajavelu	256	1.38%	
DMDK	M. Anbumani	110	0.59%	
Margin of victory		4,276	23.00%	6.27%
Turnout		18,589	90.87%	11.66%
Registered electors		20,457		2.98%
INC gain from PMC		Swing	11.15%	

=== Assembly Election 2001 ===
2001 Pondicherry Legislative Assembly election: Bahour
Party	Candidate	Votes	%	±%
PMC	P. Rajavelu	7,696	48.91%	
TMC(M)	M. Kandasamy	5,063	32.18%	
PMK	K. Deivanayagam	2,490	15.82%	
Independent	M. Rajavelu	381	2.42%	
Margin of victory		2,633	16.73%	12.14%
Turnout		15,735	79.21%	5.91%
Registered electors		19,865		6.43%
PMC gain from TMC(M)		Swing	0.28%	

=== Assembly Election 1996 ===
1996 Pondicherry Legislative Assembly election: Bahour
Party	Candidate	Votes	%	±%
TMC(M)	M. Kandasamy	7,921	51.95%	
INC	P. Rajavelu	7,221	47.36%	
Independent	N. Jayaraman	81	0.53%	
Margin of victory		700	4.59%	−10.07%
Turnout		15,246	83.48%	10.18%
Registered electors		18,664		1.65%
TMC(M) gain from Independent		Swing	3.33%	

=== Assembly Election 1991 ===
1991 Pondicherry Legislative Assembly election: Bahour
Party	Candidate	Votes	%	±%
Independent	P. Rajavelu	6,377	48.63%	
Independent	E. Rajalingam	4,454	33.96%	
CPI	A. Ramamurthy	2,074	15.82%	
PMK	G. K. Baskaran	183	1.40%	−4.04%
Margin of victory		1,923	14.66%	−6.73%
Turnout		13,114	73.30%	−5.42%
Registered electors		18,361		0.75%
Independent gain from JD		Swing	-9.16%	

=== Assembly Election 1990 ===
1990 Pondicherry Legislative Assembly election: Bahour
Party	Candidate	Votes	%	±%
JD	P. Rajavelu	8,223	57.79%	
INC	M. Rajagopalan	5,179	36.40%	−4.24%
PMK	K. Thiagarajan	774	5.44%	
Margin of victory		3,044	21.39%	14.53%
Turnout		14,229	78.72%	−6.48%
Registered electors		18,225		48.93%
JD gain from JP		Swing	10.29%	

=== Assembly Election 1985 ===
1985 Pondicherry Legislative Assembly election: Bahour
Party	Candidate	Votes	%	±%
JP	P. Uthiravelu	4,911	47.50%	
INC	S. Narayanasamy	4,201	40.63%	
DMK	P. Murthy	1,063	10.28%	−1.02%
LKD	S. Thanigasalam	164	1.59%	
Margin of victory		710	6.87%	−12.83%
Turnout		10,339	85.20%	1.12%
Registered electors		12,237		21.24%
JP hold		Swing	-3.90%	

=== Assembly Election 1980 ===
1980 Pondicherry Legislative Assembly election: Bahour
Party	Candidate	Votes	%	±%
JP	P. Uthiravelu	4,154	51.40%	
CPI	A. Ramamurthy	2,562	31.70%	11.50%
DMK	D. Brem Jeyandan	913	11.30%	8.50%
INC(U)	G. K. Baskaran	453	5.61%	
Margin of victory		1,592	19.70%	5.58%
Turnout		8,082	84.08%	3.05%
Registered electors		10,093		8.60%
JP hold		Swing	5.84%	

=== Assembly Election 1977 ===
1977 Pondicherry Legislative Assembly election: Bahour
Party	Candidate	Votes	%	±%
JP	P. Uthiravelu	3,399	45.56%	
AIADMK	A. Thulukkanam	2,346	31.44%	
CPI	R. Thangavelu Clemanso	1,507	20.20%	−18.57%
DMK	P. Ariakrishnan	209	2.80%	−5.13%
Margin of victory		1,053	14.11%	6.78%
Turnout		7,461	81.03%	−7.34%
Registered electors		9,294		10.33%
JP gain from CPI		Swing	6.79%	

=== Assembly Election 1974 ===
1974 Pondicherry Legislative Assembly election: Bahour
Party	Candidate	Votes	%	±%
CPI	Thangavel Clamanso	2,727	38.77%	−9.01%
Independent	P. Utharavelu	2,211	31.43%	
INC(O)	S. Narayanaswamy	1,538	21.87%	
DMK	K. Krishnaswamy	558	7.93%	
Margin of victory		516	7.34%	2.90%
Turnout		7,034	88.37%	2.38%
Registered electors		8,424		15.40%
CPI gain from INC		Swing	-13.45%	

=== Assembly Election 1969 ===
1969 Pondicherry Legislative Assembly election: Bahour
Party	Candidate	Votes	%	±%
INC	K. Krishnasamy	3,211	52.22%	6.36%
CPI	R. Thangavelu Clemanso	2,938	47.78%	
Margin of victory		273	4.44%	0.49%
Turnout		6,149	85.99%	6.31%
Registered electors		7,300		8.05%
INC gain from IPF		Swing	2.41%	

=== Assembly Election 1964 ===
1964 Pondicherry Legislative Assembly election: Bahour
Party	Candidate	Votes	%	±%
IPF	Thangavel Clamanso	2,612	49.81%	
INC	A. Siva	2,405	45.86%	
Independent	S. Perumal	227	4.33%	
Margin of victory		207	3.95%	
Turnout		5,244	79.68%	
Registered electors		6,756		
IPF win (new seat)				

== See also ==
- List of constituencies of the Puducherry Legislative Assembly
- Puducherry district
