= Oulgaret Assembly constituency =

Former constituency of the Puducherry Legislative Assembly

Coordinates: 11.931°N 79.776°E

Oulgaret
- Former constituency for the State Legislative Assembly

Constituency details
- Country: India
- State: Puducherry
- Established: 1964
- Abolished: 1969
- Total electors: 8,447

Oulgaret was a state assembly constituency in the Indian state of Puducherry. It was in existence for the 1964 and 1969 assembly elections.

== Members of the Legislative Assembly ==
Year	Name	Party
1964	S. Govindasamy	Indian National Congress
1969	S. Muthu	Dravida Munnetra Kazhagam

== Election results ==
Vote share of winning candidates
1969	50.15%
1964	40.92%

=== 1969 ===
1969 Pondicherry Legislative Assembly election: Oulgaret
Party	Candidate	Votes	%	±%
DMK	S. Muthu	3,452	50.15%	
INC	G. Rajamanickam	1,823	26.49%	−14.44%
Independent	S. Govindasamy	1,163	16.90%	
Independent	Latour Paul Joseph	445	6.47%	
Margin of victory		1,629	23.67%	23.18%
Turnout		6,883	83.20%	3.74%
Registered electors		8,447		7.78%
DMK gain from INC		Swing	9.23%	

=== 1964 ===
1964 Pondicherry Legislative Assembly election: Oulgaret
Party	Candidate	Votes	%	±%
INC	S. Govindasamy	2,511	40.92%	
IPF	V. Narayanasamy	2,481	40.43%	
Independent	N. Damodaran	1,144	18.64%	
Margin of victory		30	0.49%	
Turnout		6,136	79.46%	
Registered electors		7,837		
INC win (new seat)				
