= Thirunallar Assembly constituency =

Constituency of the Puducherry legislative assembly in India

Coordinates: 10.934°N 79.786°E

Thirunallar
- Constituency No. 25 for the Puducherry Legislative Assembly
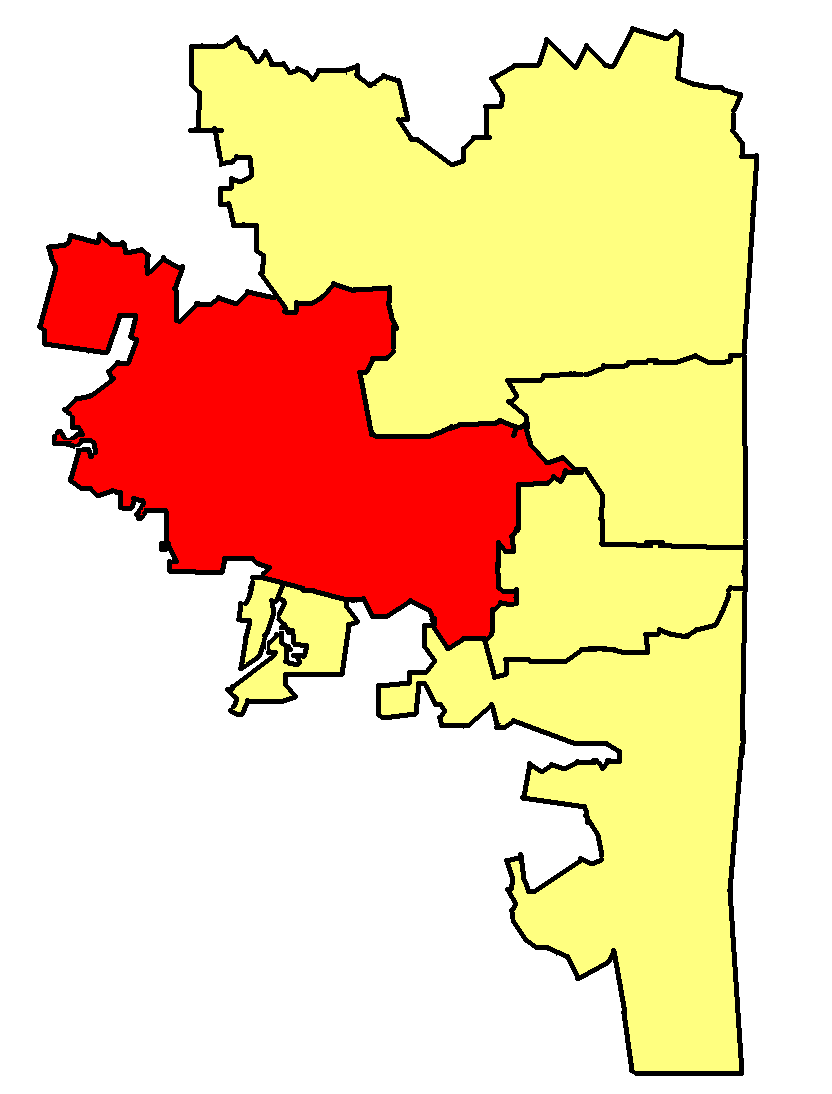

Constituency details
- Country: India
- Region: South India
- Union Territory: Puducherry
- District: Karaikal
- Lok Sabha constituency: Puducherry
- Established: 1964
- Total electors: 31,204
- Reservation: None

Member of Legislative Assembly
- 16th Puducherry Legislative Assembly
- Incumbent G. N. S. Rajasekaran
- Party: Bhartiya Janata Party
- Elected year: 2026

Thirunallar is a legislative assembly constituency in the Union territory of Puducherry in India. Thirunallar Assembly constituency was part of Puducherry Lok Sabha constituency.

== Members of Legislative Assembly ==
Year	Name	Party
1964	Subarayalu	Indian National Congress
1969	R. Supprayalu Naicker	Dravida Munnetra Kazhagam
1974	A. Soundararengan	Dravida Munnetra Kazhagam
1977	N. V. Ramalingam	Dravida Munnetra Kazhagam
1980	N. V. Ramalingam	Dravida Munnetra Kazhagam
1985	A. Soundararengan	Independent politician
1990	R. Kamalakannan	Independent politician
1991	A. Soundararengan	Dravida Munnetra Kazhagam
1996	R. Kamalakannan	Indian National Congress
2001	R. Kamalakannan	Indian National Congress
2006	P. R. Siva	Marumalarchi Dravida Munnetra Kazhagam
2011	P. R. Siva	All India N.R. Congress
2016	R. Kamalakannan	Indian National Congress
2021	P. R. Siva	Independent politician
2026	G. N. S. Rajasekaran	Bharatiya Janata Party

== Election results ==
Vote share of winning candidates
2021	36.45%
2016	51.30%
2011	50.77%
2006	49.69%
2001	42.00%
1996	48.53%
1991	41.37%
1990	35.70%
1985	45.19%
1980	44.44%
1977	34.06%
1974	49.31%
1969	54.12%
1964	68.92%

=== 2026 ===
2026 Puducherry Legislative Assembly election: Thirunallar
Party	Candidate	Votes	%	±%
BJP	G. N. S. Rajasekaran	16,829	60.18	
INC	R. Kamalakannan	7,303	26.11	
TVK	A. Raja Mohamed	3,201	11.45	
NOTA	None of the above	133	0.48	
Majority		9,526	34.07	
Turnout		27,966	89.75	
BJP gain from Independent		Swing		

=== Assembly Election 2021 ===
2021 Puducherry Legislative Assembly election: Thirunallar
Party	Candidate	Votes	%	±%
Independent	P. R. Siva	9,796	36.45	
BJP	S. Rajasekaran	8,416	31.32	
INC	R. Kamalakkannan	7,731	28.77	−22.53
NOTA	Nota	173	0.64	−0.27
DMDK	K. Guru @ Sintha	127	0.47	
Margin of victory		1,380	5.14	−6.09
Turnout		26,874	85.93	1.03
Registered electors		31,276		3.67
Independent gain from INC		Swing	-14.85	

=== Assembly Election 2016 ===
2016 Puducherry Legislative Assembly election: Thirunallar
Party	Candidate	Votes	%	±%
INC	R. Kamalakannan	13,138	51.30	4.17
AINRC	P. R. Siva	10,263	40.07	
PMK	K. Devamani	1,261	4.92	
NOTA	None of the Above	233	0.91	
AIADMK	G. Murugaiyan	220	0.86	
MDMK	Ambalavanan	129	0.50	
Independent	R. Lourdumary	115	0.45	
Margin of victory		2,875	11.23	7.58
Turnout		25,611	84.89	−1.38
Registered electors		30,169		12.92
INC gain from AINRC		Swing	0.53	

=== Assembly Election 2011 ===
2011 Puducherry Legislative Assembly election: Thirunallar
Party	Candidate	Votes	%	±%
AINRC	P. R. Siva	11,702	50.77	
INC	R. Kamalakannan	10,862	47.12	−0.61
Independent	G. Chandrasekaran	198	0.86	
Independent	M. Srinivasan	174	0.75	
BSP	V. Maheswari	114	0.49	−0.12
Margin of victory		840	3.64	1.69
Turnout		23,050	86.27	−1.58
Registered electors		26,718		61.16
AINRC gain from MDMK		Swing	1.08	

=== Assembly Election 2006 ===
2006 Pondicherry Legislative Assembly election: Thirunallar
Party	Candidate	Votes	%	±%
MDMK	P. R. Siva	7,237	49.69	
INC	R. Kamalakkannan	6,952	47.73	5.73
BJP	J. Arumugam	177	1.22	
DMDK	R. Sivakumar	109	0.75	
BSP	M. Sadick Ali	90	0.62	
Margin of victory		285	1.96	−4.08
Turnout		14,565	87.85	13.64
Registered electors		16,579		−4.13
MDMK gain from INC		Swing	7.68	

=== Assembly Election 2001 ===
2001 Pondicherry Legislative Assembly election: Thirunallar
Party	Candidate	Votes	%	±%
INC	R. Kamalakkannan	5,390	42.00	−6.53
DMK	N. V. R. Arivoli	4,615	35.96	−3.56
PMK	S. Ambalavanan	2,827	22.03	10.09
Margin of victory		775	6.04	−2.97
Turnout		12,832	74.22	2.12
Registered electors		17,294		7.37
INC hold		Swing	0.64	

=== Assembly Election 1996 ===
1996 Pondicherry Legislative Assembly election: Thirunallar
Party	Candidate	Votes	%	±%
INC	R. Kamalakannan	6,063	48.53	26.38
DMK	A. Soundarengan	4,938	39.53	−1.84
PMK	S. Ambalavanan	1,492	11.94	4.59
Margin of victory		1,125	9.01	−4.22
Turnout		12,493	78.92	6.83
Registered electors		16,107		5.81
INC gain from DMK		Swing	7.16	

=== Assembly Election 1991 ===
1991 Pondicherry Legislative Assembly election: Thirunallar
Party	Candidate	Votes	%	±%
DMK	A. Soundararengan	4,401	41.37	9.36
Independent	R. Kamalakkannan	2,994	28.14	
INC	S. P. Selvashanmugham	2,357	22.15	
PMK	S. Ambalavanan	782	7.35	−2.13
Independent	D. K. Durairaj	50	0.47	
Margin of victory		1,407	13.22	9.54
Turnout		10,639	72.09	−4.83
Registered electors		15,222		0.81
DMK gain from Independent		Swing	5.67	

=== Assembly Election 1990 ===
1990 Pondicherry Legislative Assembly election: Thirunallar
Party	Candidate	Votes	%	±%
Independent	R. Kamalakkannan	4,124	35.70	
DMK	A. Soundararengan	3,698	32.01	−4.98
AIADMK	P. Sathiadasan	2,487	21.53	7.42
PMK	S. Ambalavanan	1,095	9.48	
JP	Pon. Selvaraj	135	1.17	
Margin of victory		426	3.69	−4.52
Turnout		11,553	76.92	−4.85
Registered electors		15,100		29.99
Independent hold		Swing	-9.50	

=== Assembly Election 1985 ===
1985 Pondicherry Legislative Assembly election: Thirunallar
Party	Candidate	Votes	%	±%
Independent	A. Sonudararengan	4,246	45.19	
DMK	R. Kamalakkannan	3,475	36.99	−7.45
AIADMK	N. Ramadass	1,325	14.10	−28.19
JP	D. Ramadoss	311	3.31	
Margin of victory		771	8.21	6.05
Turnout		9,395	81.77	−2.23
Registered electors		11,616		15.87
Independent gain from DMK		Swing	0.75	

=== Assembly Election 1980 ===
1980 Pondicherry Legislative Assembly election: Thirunallar
Party	Candidate	Votes	%	±%
DMK	N. V. Ramalingam	3,573	44.44	10.38
AIADMK	A. Soundararengam	3,400	42.29	11.80
Independent	V. Arunachalam	629	7.82	
Independent	R. Renganathan	222	2.76	
Independent	S. R. Indirsetan	216	2.69	
Margin of victory		173	2.15	−1.42
Turnout		8,040	84.00	4.42
Registered electors		10,025		1.44
DMK hold		Swing	10.38	

=== Assembly Election 1977 ===
1977 Pondicherry Legislative Assembly election: Thirunallar
Party	Candidate	Votes	%	±%
DMK	N. V. Ramalingam	2,654	34.06	−15.25
AIADMK	A. Soundarengan	2,376	30.49	15.52
INC	P. Shanmugam	1,811	23.24	
JP	S. Aragasamy	952	12.22	
Margin of victory		278	3.57	−10.02
Turnout		7,793	79.58	−9.71
Registered electors		9,883		13.60
DMK hold		Swing	-15.25	

=== Assembly Election 1974 ===
1974 Pondicherry Legislative Assembly election: Thirunallar
Party	Candidate	Votes	%	±%
DMK	A. Soundararengan	3,742	49.31	−4.81
INC(O)	S. Arangasamy	2,711	35.72	
AIADMK	S. M. A. Mohamed Arif	1,136	14.97	
Margin of victory		1,031	13.59	3.54
Turnout		7,589	89.29	1.38
Registered electors		8,700		17.05
DMK hold		Swing	-4.81	

=== Assembly Election 1969 ===
1969 Pondicherry Legislative Assembly election: Thirunallar
Party	Candidate	Votes	%	±%
DMK	R. Supprayalu Naicker	3,455	54.12	
INC	V. Arunasalam	2,814	44.08	−24.84
Independent	S. Kathaperumal	115	1.80	
Margin of victory		641	10.04	−28.35
Turnout		6,384	87.91	2.27
Registered electors		7,433		7.94
DMK gain from INC		Swing	-14.80	

=== Assembly Election 1964 ===
1964 Pondicherry Legislative Assembly election: Thirunallar
Party	Candidate	Votes	%	±%
INC	Subarayalu	4,000	68.92	
Independent	Sathiamourthy	1,772	30.53	
Independent	Arunachalam	32	0.55	
Margin of victory		2,228	38.39	
Turnout		5,804	85.64	
Registered electors		6,886		
INC win (new seat)				

== See also ==
- List of constituencies of the Puducherry Legislative Assembly
- Puducherry district
