= Poudousaram Assembly constituency =

Former constituency of the Puducherry Legislative Assembly

Poudousaram
- Former constituency for the State Legislative Assembly

Constituency details
- Country: India
- State: Puducherry
- Established: 1964
- Abolished: 1969

Poudousaram was a state assembly constituency in the India state of Puducherry. It was in existence from 1964 to 1969 state elections.

== Members of the Legislative Assembly ==
Election	Member	Party
1964	N. Gurusamy	Indian People's Front
1969	N. Gurusamy	Communist Party of India

== Election results ==
=== Assembly Election 1969 ===
1969 Pondicherry Legislative Assembly election : Poudousaram
Party	Candidate	Votes	%	±%
CPI	N. Gurusamy	3,439	53.34%	New
INC	M. Krishnasamy	2,866	44.45%	▲2.31
Independent	A. D. Dinadayalan	142	2.20%	New
Margin of victory		573	8.89%	▲4.16
Turnout		6,447	78.41%	▲5.67
Registered electors		8,352		▲3.76
CPI gain from IPF		Swing	▲6.48	

=== Assembly Election 1964 ===
1964 Pondicherry Legislative Assembly election : Poudousaram
Party	Candidate	Votes	%	±%
IPF	N. Gurusamy	2,698	46.86%	New
INC	G. Rajamanickam	2,426	42.14%	New
Independent	Munisamy (Varadarasu)	633	11.00%	New
Margin of victory		272	4.72%	
Turnout		5,757	72.93%	
Registered electors		8,049		
IPF win (new seat)				
