= Thirubuvanai Assembly constituency =

Constituency of the Puducherry legislative assembly in India

Coordinates: 11.924°N 79.649°E

Thirubhuvanai
- Constituency No. 2 for the Puducherry Legislative Assembly
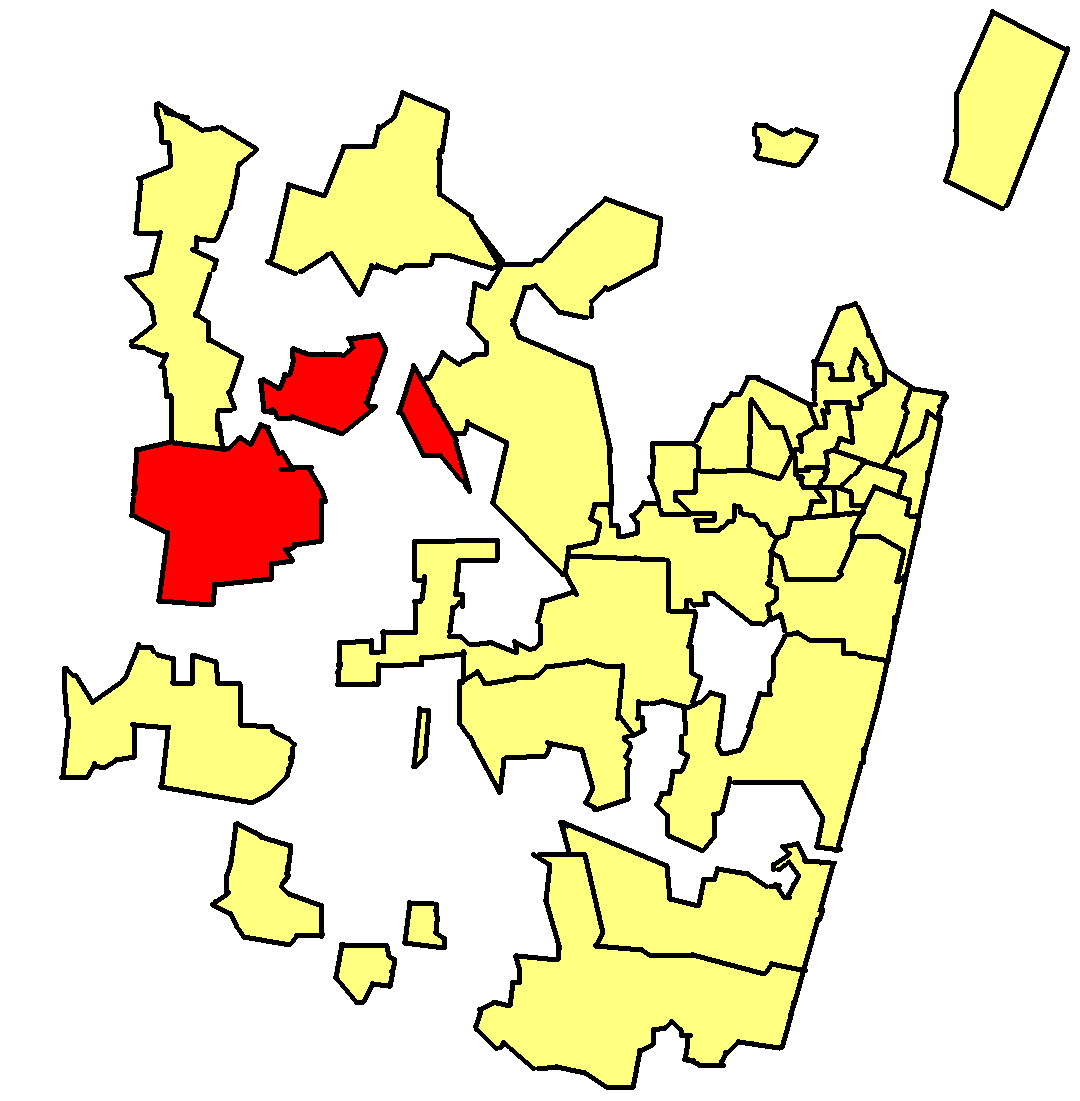

Constituency details
- Country: India
- Region: South India
- Union Territory: Puducherry
- District: Puducherry
- Lok Sabha constituency: Puducherry
- Established: 1964
- Reservation: SC

Member of Legislative Assembly
- 16th Puducherry Legislative Assembly
- Incumbent P. Angalane
- Party: Independent

Thirubuvanai is a legislative assembly constituency in the Union territory of Puducherry in India. Thirubuvanai Assembly constituency is a part of the Puducherry Lok Sabha constituency. This assembly constituency is reserved for SC candidates.

== Members of the Legislative Assembly ==
Year	Member	Party
1964	R. Kulandai	Independent politician
1969	M. Thangavelu	Dravida Munnetra Kazhagam
1974	A. Gopal	Indian National Congress
1977	M. Maniyam	All India Anna Dravida Munnetra Kazhagam
1980	P. Cattavarayane	Indian National Congress
1985	S. Komala	Dravida Munnetra Kazhagam
1990	D. Viswanathan	All India Anna Dravida Munnetra Kazhagam
1991	D. Viswanathan	All India Anna Dravida Munnetra Kazhagam
1996	S. Arasi	All India Anna Dravida Munnetra Kazhagam
2001	P. Angalane	Indian National Congress
2006	P. Angalane	Indian National Congress
2011	P. Angalane	All India N.R. Congress
2016	B. Kobiga	All India N.R. Congress
2021	P. Angalane	Independent politician
2026	Sai J. Saravanan Kumar	Tamilaga Vettri Kazhagam

== Election results ==
Vote share of winning candidates
2026	32.15%
2021	36.78%
2016	44.69%
2011	59.02%
2006	49.91%
2001	28.60%
1996	37.08%
1991	55.69%
1990	46.43%
1985	54.39%
1980	72.08%
1977	44.42%
1974	34.96%
1969	51.52%
1964	61.93%

=== Assembly Election 2026 ===
2026 Puducherry Legislative Assembly election: Thirubuvanai
Party	Candidate	Votes	%	±%
TVK	A. K. Sai J. Saravanan Kumar	9,740	32.15	New entry
AINRC	B. Gopika	9,039	29.83	▲1.23
DMK	P. Angalane	6,630	21.88	▼4.65
INC	K. Velu	3,561	11.75	New entry
CPI(M)	M. Datchanamurthy	255	0.84	New entry
NOTA	NOTA	203	0.67	▼0.32
Margin of victory		701		
Turnout		30,299		
Registered electors		31,903		
TVK gain from Independent		Swing		

=== Assembly Election 2021 ===
2021 Puducherry Legislative Assembly election: Thirubuvanai
Party	Candidate	Votes	%	±%
Independent	P. Angalane	10,597	36.78	
AINRC	B. Kobiga	8,238	28.60	
DMK	A. Muhilan	7,644	26.53	
MNM	Durai Ramesh	482	1.67	
NOTA	Nota	284	0.99	−0.84
Amma Makkal Munnettra Kazagam	Dr. K. Silambarasan	229	0.79	
Independent	S. T. Paramasivam @ Cale	182	0.63	
Margin of victory		2,359	8.19	2.92
Turnout		28,808	87.61	−1.70
Registered electors		32,883		8.08
Independent gain from AINRC		Swing	-7.90	

=== Assembly Election 2016 ===
2016 Puducherry Legislative Assembly election: Thirubuvanai
Party	Candidate	Votes	%	±%
AINRC	B. Kobiga	12,143	44.69	
INC	P. Angalane	10,711	39.42	0.89
AIADMK	M. Sankar @ Vadivelan	1,618	5.95	
CPI(M)	L. Kalivarathan	1,484	5.46	
NOTA	None of the Above	496	1.83	
Independent	S. T. Paramasivam @ Cale	213	0.78	
BJP	Sundaramoorthy	208	0.77	−0.15
Margin of victory		1,432	5.27	−15.22
Turnout		27,172	89.31	−1.51
Registered electors		30,424		18.75
AINRC hold		Swing	-14.33	

=== Assembly Election 2011 ===
2011 Puducherry Legislative Assembly election: Thirubuvanai
Party	Candidate	Votes	%	±%
AINRC	P. Angalane	13,733	59.02	
INC	K. Jayaraj	8,965	38.53	−11.38
Independent	M. Dhandapani	241	1.04	
BJP	M. Sundaramoorthy	212	0.91	−0.39
BSP	V. M. Velmurugan	118	0.51	0.00
Margin of victory		4,768	20.49	0.80
Turnout		23,269	90.82	1.90
Registered electors		25,620		7.93
AINRC gain from INC		Swing	9.11	

=== Assembly Election 2006 ===
2006 Pondicherry Legislative Assembly election: Thirubuvanai
Party	Candidate	Votes	%	±%
INC	Angalane	10,534	49.91	21.30
MDMK	S. Komala	6,378	30.22	
CPI(M)	L. Kalivaradhan	2,644	12.53	−1.38
DMDK	P. Velu	795	3.77	
Independent	D. Viswanathan	374	1.77	
BJP	N. Arumugam	274	1.30	
BSP	M. Sundaramoorthy	106	0.50	
Margin of victory		4,156	19.69	14.85
Turnout		21,108	88.92	12.71
Registered electors		23,737		8.86
INC hold		Swing	21.30	

=== Assembly Election 2001 ===
2001 Pondicherry Legislative Assembly election: Thirubuvanai
Party	Candidate	Votes	%	±%
INC	P. Angalane	4,753	28.60	
Independent	Durai Arivudainambi	3,949	23.76	
DMK	D. Angalan	3,466	20.86	−15.44
CPI(M)	L. Kalivardhan	2,311	13.91	−5.07
AIADMK	S. Arasi	1,177	7.08	−30.00
Independent	D. Viswanathan	716	4.31	
Independent	S. Komala	133	0.80	
LJP	K. Sivasacty	112	0.67	
Margin of victory		804	4.84	4.05
Turnout		16,617	76.21	6.87
Registered electors		21,805		5.26
INC gain from AIADMK		Swing	-27.08	

=== Assembly Election 1996 ===
1996 Pondicherry Legislative Assembly election: Thirubuvanai
Party	Candidate	Votes	%	±%
AIADMK	S. Arasi	5,707	37.08	−18.61
DMK	K. Jayaraj	5,586	36.29	−0.61
CPI(M)	L. Kalivaradan	2,921	18.98	
Independent	S. Komala	456	2.96	
BSP	M. Kuppusamy	119	0.77	
Independent	M. Krishnamurthy	113	0.73	
Independent	S. Deivasigamani	99	0.64	
Independent	M. Rangasamy	96	0.62	
Independent	D. Angalan	87	0.57	
Margin of victory		121	0.79	−18.00
Turnout		15,391	79.23	9.88
Registered electors		20,715		4.31
AIADMK hold		Swing	-18.61	

=== Assembly Election 1991 ===
1991 Pondicherry Legislative Assembly election: Thirubuvanai
Party	Candidate	Votes	%	±%
AIADMK	D. Viswanathan	7,453	55.69	9.25
DMK	M. Thangavelu	4,939	36.90	0.96
PMK	Iranian Alias Ethiraj	829	6.19	−10.06
THMM	N. Singaram	65	0.49	
Margin of victory		2,514	18.78	8.29
Turnout		13,384	69.35	−4.66
Registered electors		19,860		0.33
AIADMK hold		Swing	9.25	

=== Assembly Election 1990 ===
1990 Pondicherry Legislative Assembly election: Thirubuvanai
Party	Candidate	Votes	%	±%
AIADMK	D. Viswanathan	6,743	46.43	
DMK	N. Veerappan	5,219	35.94	−18.45
PMK	R. Perumal	2,360	16.25	
JP	N. Balaraman	97	0.67	
Margin of victory		1,524	10.49	1.08
Turnout		14,522	74.01	−4.84
Registered electors		19,795		46.32
AIADMK gain from DMK		Swing	-7.95	

=== Assembly Election 1985 ===
1985 Pondicherry Legislative Assembly election: Thirubuvanai
Party	Candidate	Votes	%	±%
DMK	S. Komala	5,745	54.39	
INC	P. Cattavarayane	4,751	44.98	
Independent	A. Selvarasu	67	0.63	
Margin of victory		994	9.41	−35.42
Turnout		10,563	78.85	−0.97
Registered electors		13,529		26.14
DMK gain from INC(I)		Swing	-17.70	

=== Assembly Election 1980 ===
1980 Pondicherry Legislative Assembly election: Thirubuvanai
Party	Candidate	Votes	%	±%
INC(I)	P. Cattavarayane	6,001	72.08	
AIADMK	D. Annamalai	2,269	27.26	−17.16
Independent	M. Manian	55	0.66	
Margin of victory		3,732	44.83	19.87
Turnout		8,325	79.81	5.38
Registered electors		10,725		8.29
INC(I) gain from AIADMK		Swing	27.67	

=== Assembly Election 1977 ===
1977 Pondicherry Legislative Assembly election: Thirubuvanai
Party	Candidate	Votes	%	±%
AIADMK	M. Maniyam	3,226	44.42	9.92
JP	G. Pichaikaran	1,413	19.45	
INC	K. Munian	1,065	14.66	−20.29
DMK	M. Kalvarayan	1,035	14.25	−12.42
Independent	A. Murugesan	524	7.21	
Margin of victory		1,813	24.96	24.50
Turnout		7,263	74.43	−12.77
Registered electors		9,904		9.73
AIADMK gain from INC		Swing	9.46	

=== Assembly Election 1974 ===
1974 Pondicherry Legislative Assembly election: Thirubuvanai
Party	Candidate	Votes	%	±%
INC	A. Gopal	2,672	34.96	−1.80
AIADMK	Thangavelu	2,637	34.50	
DMK	Samikannu	2,039	26.67	−24.84
CPI(M)	Govindhan	270	3.53	
Margin of victory		35	0.46	−14.30
Turnout		7,644	87.20	9.31
Registered electors		9,026		7.93
INC gain from DMK		Swing	-16.56	

=== Assembly Election 1969 ===
1969 Pondicherry Legislative Assembly election: Thirubuvanai
Party	Candidate	Votes	%	±%
DMK	M. Thangavelu	3,277	51.52	
INC	R. Mannathan	2,338	36.76	
Independent	R. Kulanthai	746	11.73	
Margin of victory		939	14.76	−9.10
Turnout		6,361	77.89	−0.06
Registered electors		8,363		6.40
DMK gain from Independent		Swing	-10.42	

=== Assembly Election 1964 ===
1964 Pondicherry Legislative Assembly election: Thirubuvanai
Party	Candidate	Votes	%	±%
Independent	R. Kulandai	3,698	61.93	
Independent	S. Thangavely	2,273	38.07	
Margin of victory		1,425	23.87	
Turnout		5,971	77.95	
Registered electors		7,860		
Independent win (new seat)				
