= Kuruchikuppam Assembly constituency =

Former constituency of the Puducherry Legislative Assembly

Kuruchikuppam
- Former constituency for the State Legislative Assembly

Constituency details
- Country: India
- State: Puducherry
- Established: 1964
- Abolished: 1969

Kuruchikuppam also known as 'Couroussoucoupom' and 'Kurusukuppam' was a state assembly constituency in the India state of Puducherry. It was in existence from 1964 to 1969 state elections.

== Members of the Legislative Assembly ==
Election	Name	Party
1964	Padmini Chandrasekaran	Indian National Congress
1969	G. Perumal Raja	Dravida Munnetra Kazhagam

== Election results ==
Vote share of Winning candidates
1969	59.89%
1964	53.23%

=== Assembly Election 1969 ===
1969 Pondicherry Legislative Assembly election : Kuruchikuppam
Party	Candidate	Votes	%	±%
DMK	G. Perumal Raja	4,068	59.89%	
INC	N. Govindaraj	1,550	22.82%	−30.41%
Independent	R. Lakshmanasamy Odayar	1,175	17.30%	
Margin of victory		2,518	37.07%	30.62%
Turnout		6,793	76.26%	3.45%
Registered electors		9,043		−4.06%
DMK gain from INC		Swing	6.66%	

=== Assembly Election 1964 ===
1964 Pondicherry Legislative Assembly election : Kuruchikuppam
Party	Candidate	Votes	%	±%
INC	Padmini Chandrasekaran	3,605	53.23%	
Independent	Murugesa Mudaliar. M.	3,168	46.77%	
Margin of victory		437	6.45%	
Turnout		6,773	72.81%	
Registered electors		9,426		
INC win (new seat)				
