= A. P. Padmanabhan =

Indian civil servant and administrator

Administrator of Mahe
- In office 18 June 1984 – 11 December 1988
- Preceded by: K. Ramachandran
- Succeeded by: K. M. Purushothaman

A. P. Padmanabhan was an Indian civil servant and administrator. He was the administrator of Mahe from 18 June 1984, to 11 December 1988.
