= Bussy Assembly constituency =

Former constituency of the Puducherry Legislative Assembly

Coordinates: 11.930°N 79.828°E

Bussy
- Former constituency for the State Legislative Assembly

Constituency details
- Country: India
- State: Puducherry
- Established: 1964
- Abolished: 2006

Bussy was a state assembly constituency in the Indian union territory of Puducherry. It was in existence from the 1964 to 2006 state elections.

== Members of the Legislative Assembly ==
Year	Member	Party
1964	C. M. Achraff	Independent
1969	C. M. Achraff	Dravida Munnetra Kazhagam
1974	S. Pakkiam	All India Anna Dravida Munnetra Kazhagam
1977	S. Susairaj	All India Anna Dravida Munnetra Kazhagam
1980	C. M. Achraff	Indian National Congress (I)
1985	C. M. Achraff	Indian National Congress
1990	C. M. Achraff	Indian National Congress
1991	C. M. Achraff	Indian National Congress
1996	C. M. Achraff	Indian National Congress
2001	Annibal Kennedy	Dravida Munnetra Kazhagam
2006	Bussy N. Anand	Puducherry Munnetra Congress

== Election results ==
Vote share of winning candidates
2006	54.06%
2001	63.77%
1996	46.26%
1991	58.80%
1990	48.30%
1985	53.17%
1980	69.36%
1977	31.87%
1974	38.59%
1969	75.94%
1964	62.72%

=== Assembly Election 2006 ===
2006 Pondicherry Legislative Assembly election: Bussy
Party	Candidate	Votes	%	±%
PMC	Bussy N. Anand	2,423	54.06	
DMK	Annibal Kennedy	1,952	43.55	−20.22
BJP	M. Gopalakrishnan	50	1.12	
DMDK	S. Prabhakaran	29	0.65	
Independent	B. Nafisha Begam	23	0.51	
Margin of victory		471	10.51	−34.59
Turnout		4,482	79.65	28.64
Registered electors		5,627		−40.74
PMC gain from DMK		Swing	-9.71	

=== Assembly Election 2001 ===
2001 Pondicherry Legislative Assembly election: Bussy
Party	Candidate	Votes	%	±%
DMK	Annibal Kennedy	3,087	63.77	
AIADMK	S. Babu Ansardeen	904	18.67	
CPI	A. Abdul Rachide	850	17.56	−11.31
Margin of victory		2,183	45.09	27.70
Turnout		4,841	51.02	−3.95
Registered electors		9,495		17.11
DMK gain from INC		Swing	4.97	

=== Assembly Election 1996 ===
1996 Pondicherry Legislative Assembly election: Bussy
Party	Candidate	Votes	%	±%
INC	C. M. Achraff	2,208	46.26	−12.54
CPI	A. Abdul Rachide	1,378	28.87	
JD	R. Ravindiran	954	19.99	
Independent	M. Arumaiselvam	118	2.47	
BJP	Pa. Rajalakshmi	46	0.96	0.11
Independent	B. Irudaya Raj @ B. Idayavendhane	25	0.52	
Margin of victory		830	17.39	−2.47
Turnout		4,773	60.37	5.41
Registered electors		8,108		−16.80
INC hold		Swing	-12.54	

=== Assembly Election 1991 ===
1991 Pondicherry Legislative Assembly election: Bussy
Party	Candidate	Votes	%	±%
INC	C. M. Achraff	3,083	58.80	10.50
DMK	G. Perularaja	2,042	38.95	−5.25
BJP	Andre Zeganaden Ashok	45	0.86	
Margin of victory		1,041	19.86	15.75
Turnout		5,243	54.96	−4.00
Registered electors		9,745		1.99
INC hold		Swing	10.50	

=== Assembly Election 1990 ===
1990 Pondicherry Legislative Assembly election: Bussy
Party	Candidate	Votes	%	±%
INC	C. M. Achraff	2,692	48.30	−4.87
DMK	S. Babu Ansardeen	2,463	44.20	7.77
Independent	S. Pakkiam	230	4.13	
Independent	A. Raja Manickam	84	1.51	
Independent	R. Narayanasamy	41	0.74	
JP	J. Subramanian Alias Sankar	39	0.70	
Margin of victory		229	4.11	−12.64
Turnout		5,573	58.96	−4.61
Registered electors		9,555		44.18
INC hold		Swing	-4.87	

=== Assembly Election 1985 ===
1985 Pondicherry Legislative Assembly election: Bussy
Party	Candidate	Votes	%	±%
INC	C. M. Achraff	2,213	53.17	
DMK	S. Babu Ansardeen	1,516	36.42	
JP	M. Loganathan	264	6.34	
Independent	C. A. Gaffour	169	4.06	
Margin of victory		697	16.75	−35.48
Turnout		4,162	63.57	−9.55
Registered electors		6,627		12.51
INC gain from INC(I)		Swing	-16.19	

=== Assembly Election 1980 ===
1980 Pondicherry Legislative Assembly election: Bussy
Party	Candidate	Votes	%	±%
INC(I)	C. M. Achraff	2,898	69.36	
AIADMK	R. P. Joseph	716	17.14	−14.74
Independent	A. Jayaraj	469	11.23	
Independent	E. Ramachandran	60	1.44	
JP(S)	A. Philomina	35	0.84	
Margin of victory		2,182	52.23	49.09
Turnout		4,178	73.12	10.37
Registered electors		5,890		−9.31
INC(I) gain from AIADMK		Swing	37.49	

=== Assembly Election 1977 ===
1977 Pondicherry Legislative Assembly election: Bussy
Party	Candidate	Votes	%	±%
AIADMK	S. Susairaj	1,289	31.87	−6.71
INC	C. M. Achraff	1,162	28.73	
JP	N. Masthan	1,033	25.54	
DMK	J. Narayanan	546	13.50	−14.82
Margin of victory		127	3.14	−2.35
Turnout		4,044	62.76	−12.72
Registered electors		6,495		9.99
AIADMK hold		Swing	-6.71	

=== Assembly Election 1974 ===
1974 Pondicherry Legislative Assembly election: Bussy
Party	Candidate	Votes	%	±%
AIADMK	S. Pakkiam	1,680	38.59	
INC(O)	A. Jayaraj	1,441	33.10	
DMK	C. M. Achraff	1,233	28.32	−47.62
Margin of victory		239	5.49	−46.40
Turnout		4,354	75.48	11.60
Registered electors		5,905		20.04
AIADMK gain from DMK		Swing	-37.36	

=== Assembly Election 1969 ===
1969 Pondicherry Legislative Assembly election: Bussy
Party	Candidate	Votes	%	±%
DMK	C. M. Achraff	2,336	75.94	
INC	M. J. Vincent	740	24.06	3.15
Margin of victory		1,596	51.89	10.07
Turnout		3,076	63.87	−1.24
Registered electors		4,919		−16.41
DMK gain from Independent		Swing	13.22	

=== Assembly Election 1964 ===
1964 Pondicherry Legislative Assembly election: Bussy
Party	Candidate	Votes	%	±%
Independent	C. M. Achraff	2,367	62.72	
INC	Paul Ambroise	789	20.91	
IPF	Muhammed Houssain	618	16.38	
Margin of victory		1,578	41.81	
Turnout		3,774	65.11	
Registered electors		5,885		
Independent win (new seat)				
