= Neravy T. R. Pattinam Assembly constituency =

Constituency of the Puducherry legislative assembly in India

Coordinates: 10.868°N 79.831°E

Neravy-TR-Pattinam
- Constituency No. 28 for the Puducherry Legislative Assembly
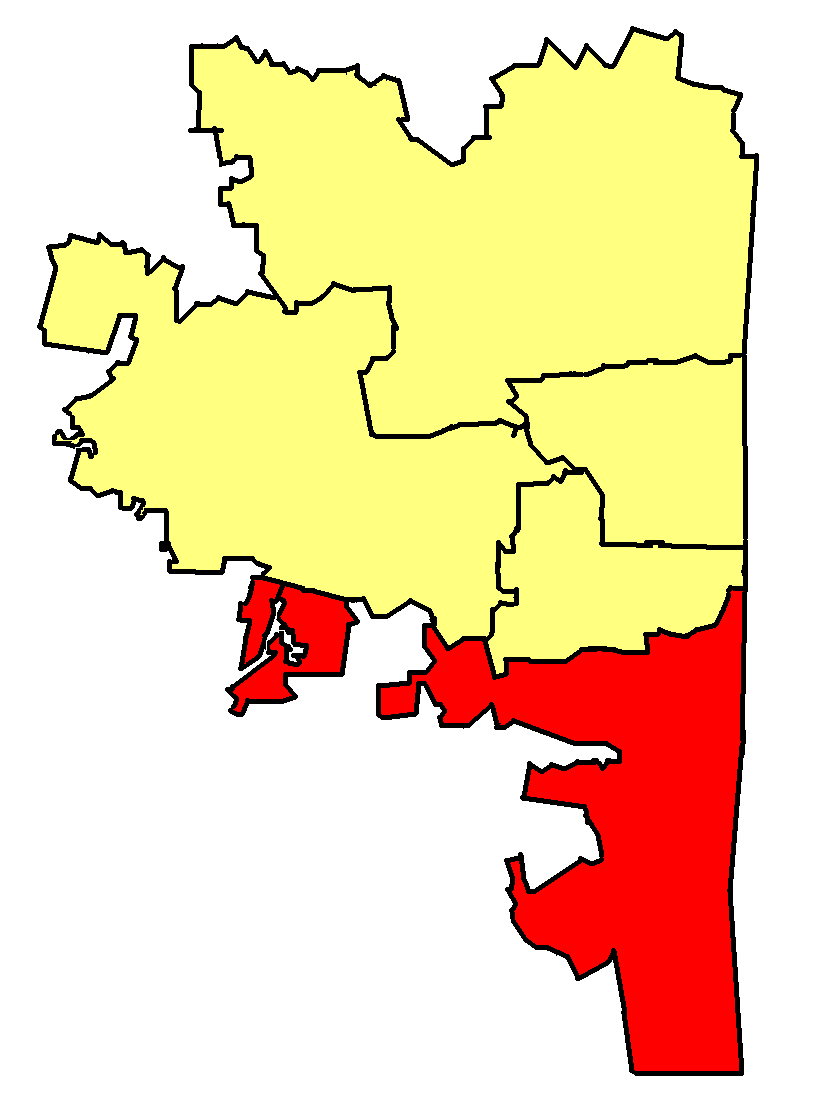

Constituency details
- Country: India
- Region: South India
- Union Territory: Puducherry
- District: Karaikal
- Lok Sabha constituency: Puducherry
- Established: 1964
- Total electors: 31,277
- Reservation: None

Member of Legislative Assembly
- 16th Puducherry Legislative Assembly
- Incumbent T. K. S. M. Meenatchisundaram
- Party: Bharatiya Janata Party
- Elected year: 2026

Neravy -TR- Pattinam is a legislative assembly constituency in the Union territory of Puducherry in India. Neravy T. R. Pattinam Assembly constituency is part of Puducherry Lok Sabha constituency.

== Members of the Legislative Assembly ==
Year	Member	Party
1964	Nagamuttou Pillai	Indian National Congress
1969	S. Ramasamy	Dravida Munnetra Kazhagam
1974	V. M. C. Varada Pillai	All India Anna Dravida Munnetra Kazhagam
1977	V. M. C. Varada Pillai	Janata Party
1980	V. M. C. Sivakumar	Dravida Munnetra Kazhagam
1985	V. M. C. Varada Pillai	All India Anna Dravida Munnetra Kazhagam
1990	V. M. C. V. Ganapathy	All India Anna Dravida Munnetra Kazhagam
1991	V. M. C. V. Ganapathy	All India Anna Dravida Munnetra Kazhagam
1996	V. M. C. Sivakumar	Dravida Munnetra Kazhagam
2001	V. M. C. Sivakumar	Dravida Munnetra Kazhagam
2006	V. M. C. Sivakumar	Dravida Munnetra Kazhagam
2011	V. M. C. Sivakumar	Independent politician
2016	A. Geetha	Dravida Munnetra Kazhagam
2021	M. Nagathiyagarajan	Dravida Munnetra Kazhagam
2026	T. K. S. M. Meenatchisundaram	Bharatiya Janata Party

== Election results ==
Vote share of winning candidates
2021	55.74%
2016	60.16%
2011	39.30%
2006	31.41%
2001	46.96%
1996	53.44%
1991	49.67%
1990	51.72%
1985	53.46%
1980	57.35%
1977	36.71%
1974	59.89%
1969	53.88%
1964	56.80%

=== Assembly Election 2026 ===
2026 Puducherry Legislative Assembly election: Neravy T. R. Pattinam
Party	Candidate	Votes	%	±%
BJP	T. K. S. M. Meenatchisundaram	10,818	40.75	▲6.20
DMK	M. Nagathiyagarajan	8,800	33.15	▼22.59
Independent	V. M. C. S. Manoharen	3,296	12.42	New
TVK	G. Ganesh	2,878	10.84	New
NOTA	NOTA	137	0.52	▼0.20
Margin of victory		2,018	7.60	▼13.59
Turnout		26545		
Rejected ballots				
Registered electors		29,815		
BJP gain from DMK		Swing		

=== Assembly Election 2021 ===
2021 Puducherry Legislative Assembly election: Neravy T R Pattinam
Party	Candidate	Votes	%	±%
DMK	M. Nagathiyagarajan	14,496	55.74	−4.42
BJP	V. M. C. S. Manoharen	8,985	34.55	33.60
Independent	Geetha Anandan	1,495	5.75	
NOTA	Nota	186	0.72	−0.21
Independent	S. Sridhar	140	0.54	
Margin of victory		5,511	21.19	−6.64
Turnout		26,006	83.40	−1.45
Registered electors		31,183		6.16
DMK hold		Swing	-4.42	

=== Assembly Election 2016 ===
2016 Puducherry Legislative Assembly election: Neravy T R Pattinam
Party	Candidate	Votes	%	±%
DMK	A. Geetha	14,993	60.16	22.44
AIADMK	V. M. C. Sivakumar	8,057	32.33	23.17
AINRC	K. R. Udayakumar	373	1.50	
CPI(M)	S. Mohamed Thameem Ansari	334	1.34	
BJP	M. Kumaravelu	237	0.95	
NOTA	None of the Above	231	0.93	
PMK	Chelladurai	203	0.81	
SDPI	Z. Sultan Ghouse Hameed Malim	187	0.75	−0.33
Margin of victory		6,936	27.83	26.24
Turnout		24,922	84.85	−0.72
Registered electors		29,373		11.50
DMK gain from Independent		Swing	20.86	

=== Assembly Election 2011 ===
2011 Puducherry Legislative Assembly election: Neravy T R Pattinam
Party	Candidate	Votes	%	±%
Independent	V. M. C. Sivakumar	8,860	39.30	
DMK	A. Geetha	8,502	37.72	6.31
Independent	V. M. C. V. Ganapathy	2,809	12.46	
AIADMK	Er. M. Selvaraj	2,065	9.16	−9.67
SDPI	H. Badouroudine	243	1.08	
Margin of victory		358	1.59	0.42
Turnout		22,542	85.57	−0.99
Registered electors		26,343		44.81
Independent gain from DMK		Swing	7.90	

=== Assembly Election 2006 ===
2006 Pondicherry Legislative Assembly election: Neravy T R Pattinam
Party	Candidate	Votes	%	±%
DMK	V. M. C. Sivakumar	4,946	31.41	−15.55
Independent	V. M. C. V. Ganapathy	4,762	30.24	
AIADMK	V. Jayabal	2,965	18.83	−3.74
Independent	M. Selvaraj	2,932	18.62	
BJP	S. Vadivel	72	0.46	
Independent	U. Ganapathy	71	0.45	
Margin of victory		184	1.17	−19.46
Turnout		15,748	86.57	15.04
Registered electors		18,192		−8.50
DMK hold		Swing	-15.55	

=== Assembly Election 2001 ===
2001 Pondicherry Legislative Assembly election: Neravy T R Pattinam
Party	Candidate	Votes	%	±%
DMK	V. M. C. Sivakumar	6,672	46.96	−6.48
TMC(M)	V. M. C. V. Ganapathy	3,741	26.33	
AIADMK	V. M. C. Raja Alias V. M. C. Sivashanmuganathan	3,207	22.57	7.38
MDMK	R. Raja	589	4.15	
Margin of victory		2,931	20.63	−1.96
Turnout		14,209	71.52	−4.40
Registered electors		19,881		6.44
DMK hold		Swing	-2.71	

=== Assembly Election 1996 ===
1996 Pondicherry Legislative Assembly election: Neravy T R Pattinam
Party	Candidate	Votes	%	±%
DMK	V. M. C. Sivakumar	7,595	53.44	5.63
Independent	S. T. P. Diravidamani	4,385	30.85	
AIADMK	A. M. K. Balu	2,159	15.19	−34.47
Margin of victory		3,210	22.59	20.73
Turnout		14,212	78.01	2.09
Registered electors		18,678		7.75
DMK gain from AIADMK		Swing	3.78	

=== Assembly Election 1991 ===
1991 Pondicherry Legislative Assembly election: Neravy T R Pattinam
Party	Candidate	Votes	%	±%
AIADMK	V. M. C. V. Ganapathy	6,384	49.67	−2.05
DMK	V. M. C. Sivakumar	6,145	47.81	2.23
Pondicherry Mannila Makkal Munnani	S. Gunasegaran	219	1.70	
BJP	V. A. Kannaiyan	66	0.51	
Margin of victory		239	1.86	−4.29
Turnout		12,854	75.92	−5.01
Registered electors		17,334		1.29
AIADMK hold		Swing	-2.05	

=== Assembly Election 1990 ===
1990 Pondicherry Legislative Assembly election: Neravy T R Pattinam
Party	Candidate	Votes	%	±%
AIADMK	V. Ganapathy	7,102	51.72	−1.75
DMK	V. M. C. Sivakumar	6,258	45.57	−0.96
PMK	V. Ramalingam	239	1.74	
Independent	K. S. M. Ameed Sultan	74	0.54	
Margin of victory		844	6.15	−0.78
Turnout		13,732	80.93	−2.37
Registered electors		17,113		30.38
AIADMK hold		Swing	-1.75	

=== Assembly Election 1985 ===
1985 Pondicherry Legislative Assembly election: Neravy T R Pattinam
Party	Candidate	Votes	%	±%
AIADMK	V. M. C. Varada Pillai	5,788	53.46	10.81
DMK	V. M. C. Sivakumar	5,038	46.54	−10.81
Margin of victory		750	6.93	−7.77
Turnout		10,826	83.30	0.30
Registered electors		13,125		14.34
AIADMK gain from DMK		Swing	-3.88	

=== Assembly Election 1980 ===
1980 Pondicherry Legislative Assembly election: Neravy T R Pattinam
Party	Candidate	Votes	%	±%
DMK	V. M. C. Sivakumar	5,315	57.35	22.63
AIADMK	V. M. C. Varada Pillai	3,953	42.65	16.22
Margin of victory		1,362	14.70	12.70
Turnout		9,268	83.00	4.44
Registered electors		11,479		−1.00
DMK gain from JP		Swing	20.64	

=== Assembly Election 1977 ===
1977 Pondicherry Legislative Assembly election: Neravy T R Pattinam
Party	Candidate	Votes	%	±%
JP	V. M. C. Varada Pillai	3,314	36.71	
DMK	V. M. C. Sivakumar	3,134	34.71	0.99
AIADMK	T. K. S. M. Soma Sundaram	2,386	26.43	−33.46
INC	G. Jayabalan	194	2.15	−3.74
Margin of victory		180	1.99	−24.17
Turnout		9,028	78.57	−8.14
Registered electors		11,595		11.48
JP gain from AIADMK		Swing	-23.18	

=== Assembly Election 1974 ===
1974 Pondicherry Legislative Assembly election: Neravy T R Pattinam
Party	Candidate	Votes	%	±%
AIADMK	V. M. C. Varada Pillai	5,313	59.89	
DMK	V. M. C. Siva Shanmuganathan	2,992	33.73	−20.15
INC	A. Abdul Jabbar	522	5.88	−40.24
Independent	G. Rethinavel	44	0.50	
Margin of victory		2,321	26.16	18.41
Turnout		8,871	86.71	−2.96
Registered electors		10,401		44.00
AIADMK gain from DMK		Swing	6.02	

=== Assembly Election 1969 ===
1969 Pondicherry Legislative Assembly election: Neravy T R Pattinam
Party	Candidate	Votes	%	±%
DMK	S. Ramasamy	3,447	53.88	
INC	M. Kaliappa Naicker	2,951	46.12	−10.67
Margin of victory		496	7.75	−10.91
Turnout		6,398	89.67	3.21
Registered electors		7,223		8.37
DMK gain from INC		Swing	-2.92	

=== Assembly Election 1964 ===
1964 Pondicherry Legislative Assembly election: Neravy T R Pattinam
Party	Candidate	Votes	%	±%
INC	Nagamuttou Pillai	3,222	56.80	
Independent	Ramassamy	2,163	38.13	
IPF	Ambiga Sudiramourthy	288	5.08	
Margin of victory		1,059	18.67	
Turnout		5,673	86.47	
Registered electors		6,665		
INC win (new seat)				

== See also ==
- List of constituencies of the Puducherry Legislative Assembly
- Karaikal district
