= Grandi Aldee Assembly constituency =

Former constituency of the Puducherry Legislative Assembly

Grand’ Aldee
- Former constituency for the State Legislative Assembly

Constituency details
- Country: India
- State: Puducherry
- Established: 1964
- Abolished: 1969

Grandi Aldee was a state assembly constituency in the Indian state of Puducherry. It was in existence from the 1964 to the 1969 state elections.

== Members of the Legislative Assembly ==
Year	Member	Party
1964	V. M. C. Varada Pillai	Indian National Congress
1969	Y. Pandari Nathan	Dravida Munnetra Kazhagam

== Election results ==
Vote share of winning candidates
1969	70.82%
1964	70.58%

=== 1969 ===
1969 Pondicherry Legislative Assembly election: Grand’ Aldee
Party	Candidate	Votes	%	±%
DMK	Y. Pandari Nathan	3,852	70.82%	
Independent	G. Muthukrishnan	1,026	18.86%	
INC	V. Ganabadhi Pillai	561	10.31%	−60.27%
Margin of victory		2,826	51.96%	10.79%
Turnout		5,439	85.47%	−1.49%
Registered electors		6,461		9.56%
DMK gain from INC		Swing	0.24%	

=== 1964 ===
1964 Pondicherry Legislative Assembly election: Grand’ Aldee
Party	Candidate	Votes	%	±%
INC	V. M. C. Varada Pillai	3,544	70.58%	
Independent	Pandarinathan	1,477	29.42%	
Margin of victory		2,067	41.17%	
Turnout		5,021	86.96%	
Registered electors		5,897		
INC win (new seat)				
