= Muthialpet Assembly constituency =

Constituency of the Puducherry legislative assembly in India

Coordinates: 11.954°N 79.834°E

Muthialpeth
- Constituency No. 13 for the Puducherry Legislative Assembly
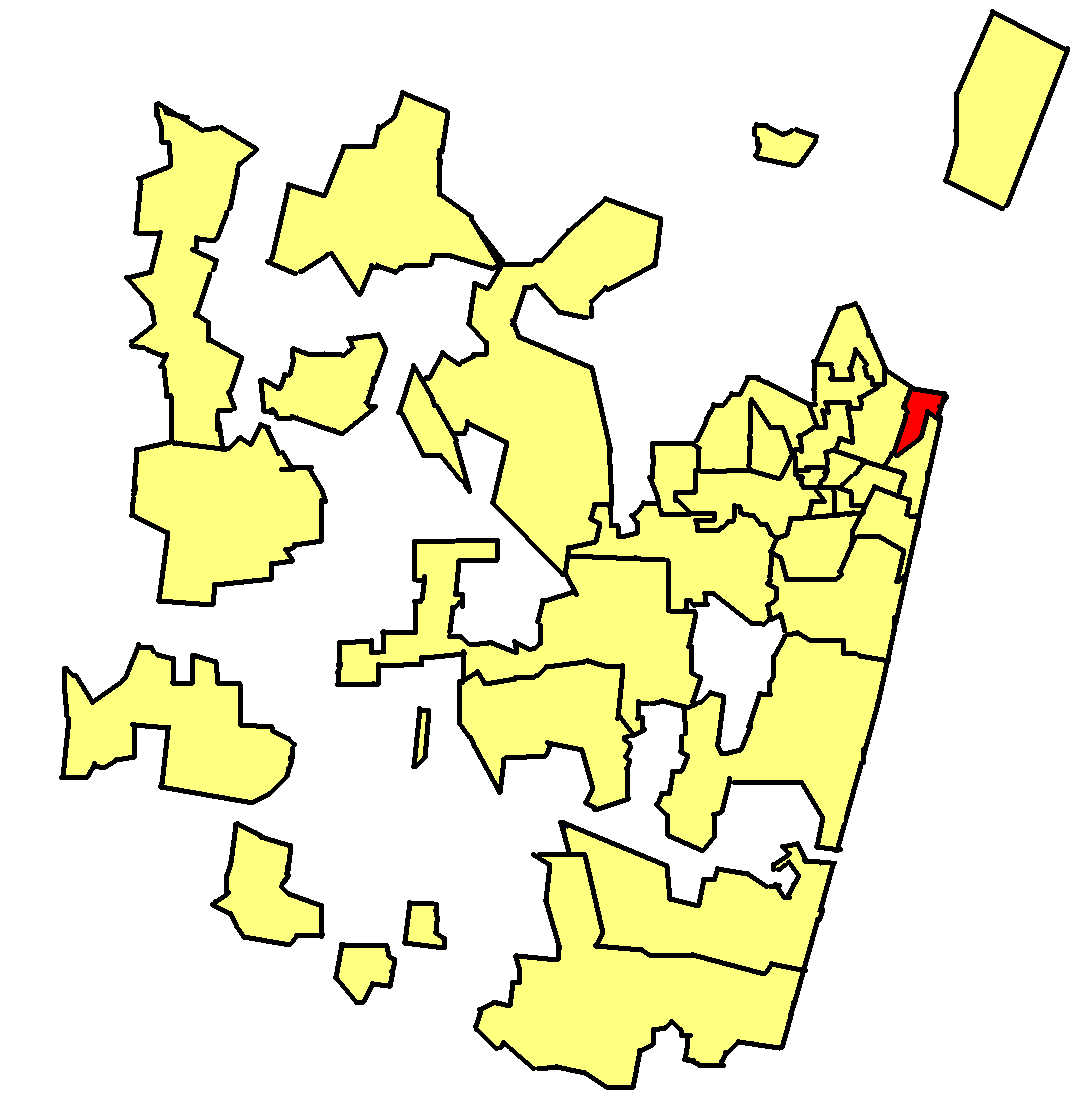

Constituency details
- Country: India
- Region: South India
- Union Territory: Puducherry
- District: Puducherry
- Lok Sabha constituency: Puducherry
- Established: 1964
- Total electors: 29,924
- Reservation: None

Member of Legislative Assembly
- 16th Puducherry Legislative Assembly
- Incumbent J. Prakash Kumar
- Party: Tamilaga Vettri Kazhagam
- Elected year: 2021

Muthialpet is a legislative assembly constituency in the Union territory of Puducherry in India. This constituency covers the area under wards 1-4 and 6-8 of Puducherry Municipality. Muthialpet Assembly constituency is a part of Puducherry Lok Sabha constituency.

== Members of Legislative Assembly ==
Year	Member	Party
1964	P. Shanmugam	Indian National Congress
1969	K. Murugaiyan	Dravida Munnetra Kazhagam
1974	G. Pajani Raja	All India Anna Dravida Munnetra Kazhagam
1977	G. Pajani Raja	All India Anna Dravida Munnetra Kazhagam
1980	G. Pajani Raja	Dravida Munnetra Kazhagam
1985	G. Pajani Raja	Dravida Munnetra Kazhagam
1990	G. Pajani Raja	Dravida Munnetra Kazhagam
1991	M. Balasubramaniam	All India Anna Dravida Munnetra Kazhagam
1996	S. Anandavelu	All India Anna Dravida Munnetra Kazhagam
2001	A. Kasilingam	All India Anna Dravida Munnetra Kazhagam
2006	Nandha T. Saravanan	Dravida Munnetra Kazhagam
2011	Nandha T. Saravanan	Dravida Munnetra Kazhagam
2016	Vaiyapuri Manikandan	All India Anna Dravida Munnetra Kazhagam
2021	J. Prakash Kumar	Independent politician
2026	Vaiyapuri Manikandan	All India N.R. Congress

== Election results ==
Vote share of winning candidates
2021	37.48%
2016	39.20%
2011	47.82%
2006	56.37%
2001	38.02%
1996	56.26%
1991	52.38%
1990	55.74%
1985	53.93%
1980	63.71%
1977	42.69%
1974	43.87%
1969	55.52%
1964	33.06%

=== Assembly Election 2026 ===
2026 Puducherry Legislative Assembly election: Muthialpet
Party	Candidate	Votes	%	±%
AINRC	Vaiyapuri Manikandan	8382	35.58	
INC	M. Rajendran	7430	31.54	
TVK	J. Prakash Kumar	3611	15.33	New
NOTA	NOTA	162	0.69	
Margin of victory		952		
Turnout		23560		
Rejected ballots				
Registered electors		25,993		
gain from		Swing		

=== Assembly Election 2021 ===
2021 Puducherry Legislative Assembly election: Muthialpet
Party	Candidate	Votes	%	±%
Independent	J. Prakash Kumar	8,778	37.48	
AIADMK	Vaiyapuri Manikandan	7,844	33.49	−5.71
INC	S. Senthil Kumaran	4,402	18.79	
MNM	K. Saravanan	732	3.13	
CPI(M)	R. Saravanan	321	1.37	
NOTA	Nota	264	1.13	−1.20
Margin of victory		934	3.99	−5.18
Turnout		23,423	78.64	−3.17
Registered electors		29,785		3.20
Independent gain from AIADMK		Swing	-1.73	

=== Assembly Election 2016 ===
2016 Puducherry Legislative Assembly election: Muthialpet
Party	Candidate	Votes	%	±%
AIADMK	Vaiyapuri Manikandan	9,257	39.20	5.11
AINRC	J. Pregash Kumar	7,093	30.04	
DMK	S. P. Sivakumar	5,268	22.31	−25.51
NOTA	None of the Above	549	2.32	
BJP	T. Sivakumar	496	2.10	0.91
CPI	K. Murugan	339	1.44	
PMK	G. Ganapathy	135	0.57	
Margin of victory		2,164	9.16	−4.57
Turnout		23,613	81.81	0.79
Registered electors		28,862		7.92
AIADMK gain from DMK		Swing	-8.62	

=== Assembly Election 2011 ===
2011 Puducherry Legislative Assembly election: Muthialpet
Party	Candidate	Votes	%	±%
DMK	Nandha T. Saravanan	10,364	47.82	−8.55
AIADMK	A. Kasilingam	7,388	34.09	1.31
Independent	A. Paramasivam	3,427	15.81	
BJP	Krishnakanthan @ Baskar	257	1.19	−2.11
CPI(ML)L	S. Mothilal	148	0.68	
Margin of victory		2,976	13.73	−9.86
Turnout		21,671	81.03	0.06
Registered electors		26,745		4.71
DMK hold		Swing	-8.55	

=== Assembly Election 2006 ===
2006 Pondicherry Legislative Assembly election: Muthialpet
Party	Candidate	Votes	%	±%
DMK	Nandha T. Saravanan	11,658	56.37	28.94
AIADMK	A. Kasilingam	6,779	32.78	−5.24
BJP	M. Visweswaran	682	3.30	
DMDK	K. Mullai	504	2.44	
Margin of victory		4,879	23.59	13.00
Turnout		20,680	80.97	16.30
Registered electors		25,541		−8.50
DMK gain from AIADMK		Swing	18.35	

=== Assembly Election 2001 ===
2001 Pondicherry Legislative Assembly election: Muthialpet
Party	Candidate	Votes	%	±%
AIADMK	A. Kasilingam	6,857	38.02	−18.24
DMK	Raja Chandrasekaran	4,947	27.43	−13.95
INC	G. Pajaniraja	3,645	20.21	
MDMK	R. K. Sathish Kumar	2,195	12.17	
Independent	Vinayagamoorthy Alias Vinayagam	163	0.90	
Independent	E. Kuppan	136	0.75	
CPI(ML)L	S. Arul	90	0.50	
Margin of victory		1,910	10.59	−4.29
Turnout		18,033	64.67	0.98
Registered electors		27,915		−2.42
AIADMK hold		Swing	-14.36	

=== Assembly Election 1996 ===
1996 Pondicherry Legislative Assembly election: Muthialpet
Party	Candidate	Votes	%	±%
AIADMK	S. Anandavelu	11,009	56.26	3.88
DMK	G. Palani Raja	8,098	41.39	−4.63
MDMK	S. Rajamanickam @ Elango	157	0.80	
Independent	N. Ezhilarasan	95	0.49	
Margin of victory		2,911	14.88	8.51
Turnout		19,567	69.96	6.27
Registered electors		28,606		1.47
AIADMK hold		Swing	3.88	

=== Assembly Election 1991 ===
1991 Pondicherry Legislative Assembly election: Muthialpet
Party	Candidate	Votes	%	±%
AIADMK	M. Balasubramaniam	9,175	52.38	8.12
DMK	S. Anandavelu	8,060	46.02	−9.72
Independent	D. Sivaraj	167	0.95	
Margin of victory		1,115	6.37	−5.11
Turnout		17,515	63.69	−3.54
Registered electors		28,191		−1.11
AIADMK gain from DMK		Swing	-3.36	

=== Assembly Election 1990 ===
1990 Pondicherry Legislative Assembly election: Muthialpet
Party	Candidate	Votes	%	±%
DMK	G. Palani Raja	10,571	55.74	1.81
AIADMK	R. Kalipaerumal Alias Perumal	8,394	44.26	0.94
Margin of victory		2,177	11.48	0.87
Turnout		18,965	67.23	−9.10
Registered electors		28,508		48.96
DMK hold		Swing	1.81	

=== Assembly Election 1985 ===
1985 Pondicherry Legislative Assembly election: Muthialpet
Party	Candidate	Votes	%	±%
DMK	G. Palani Raja	7,820	53.93	−9.78
AIADMK	A. Kasilingam	6,281	43.32	13.55
JP	A. Savarimuthu	259	1.79	
Margin of victory		1,539	10.61	−23.33
Turnout		14,500	76.33	−1.76
Registered electors		19,138		23.38
DMK hold		Swing	-9.78	

=== Assembly Election 1980 ===
1980 Pondicherry Legislative Assembly election: Muthialpet
Party	Candidate	Votes	%	±%
DMK	G. Palani Raja	7,396	63.71	50.21
AIADMK	A. V. Vaithilingam	3,456	29.77	−12.92
Independent	K. Murugaiyan	605	5.21	
INC(U)	Adrien	152	1.31	
Margin of victory		3,940	33.94	19.02
Turnout		11,609	78.09	9.64
Registered electors		15,512		7.74
DMK gain from AIADMK		Swing	21.02	

=== Assembly Election 1977 ===
1977 Pondicherry Legislative Assembly election: Muthialpet
Party	Candidate	Votes	%	±%
AIADMK	G. Palani Raja	4,170	42.69	−1.19
JP	M. Velayudham	2,713	27.77	
DMK	K. Murugaian	1,319	13.50	−3.56
INC	A. Balasubramanian	1,295	13.26	
Independent	G. Bhuvanendiran	203	2.08	
Independent	M. Velayudham Chettiar	69	0.71	
Margin of victory		1,457	14.91	10.11
Turnout		9,769	68.46	−13.75
Registered electors		14,397		17.34
AIADMK hold		Swing	-1.19	

=== Assembly Election 1974 ===
1974 Pondicherry Legislative Assembly election: Muthialpet
Party	Candidate	Votes	%	±%
AIADMK	G. Pajaniraja	4,315	43.87	
INC(O)	M. Thangapragasam	3,842	39.06	
DMK	K. Murugaiyan	1,678	17.06	−38.46
Margin of victory		473	4.81	−6.23
Turnout		9,835	82.21	−1.57
Registered electors		12,269		69.37
AIADMK gain from DMK		Swing	-11.64	

=== Assembly Election 1969 ===
1969 Pondicherry Legislative Assembly election: Muthialpet
Party	Candidate	Votes	%	±%
DMK	K. Murugaiyan	3,290	55.52	
INC	M. Thangapragasam	2,636	44.48	11.42
Margin of victory		654	11.04	5.35
Turnout		5,926	83.78	2.37
Registered electors		7,244		11.39
DMK gain from INC		Swing	22.46	

=== Assembly Election 1964 ===
1964 Pondicherry Legislative Assembly election: Muthialpet
Party	Candidate	Votes	%	±%
INC	P. Shanmugam	1,726	33.06	
Independent	Thangaprakasam	1,429	27.37	
IPF	Dhatchanamurthy	1,011	19.36	
Independent	K. Murugaian	882	16.89	
Independent	A. Arul Raj	173	3.31	
Margin of victory		297	5.69	
Turnout		5,221	81.41	
Registered electors		6,503		
INC win (new seat)				

== See also ==
- List of constituencies of the Puducherry Legislative Assembly
- Puducherry district
