= Palloor Assembly constituency =

Former constituency of the Puducherry Legislative Assembly

Coordinates: 11.7324°N 75.5395°E

Palloor
- Former constituency for the Puducherry Legislative Assembly

Constituency details
- Country: India
- Region: South India
- Union Territory: Puducherry
- Established: 1964
- Abolished: 2011

Palloor was a state assembly constituency in the India state of Puducherry. It was in existence from the 1964 to the 2006 state elections.

== Members of the Legislative Assembly ==
| Year | Member | Party |
|---|---|---|
| 1964 | Vanmeri Nadeyi Purushothaman | Indian National Congress |
| 1969 | Vanmeri Nadeyi Purushothaman | Indian National Congress |
| 1974 | Vanmeri Nadeyi Purushothaman | Indian National Congress |
| 1977 | T. K. Chandrashekaran | Independent politician |
| 1980 | N. K. Sachindranath | Indian National Congress |
| 1985 | A. V. Sreedharan | Indian National Congress |
| 1990 | A. V. Sreedharan | Indian National Congress |
| 1991 | A. V. Sreedharan | Indian National Congress |
| 1996 | A. V. Sreedharan | Indian National Congress |
| 2001 | A. V. Sreedharan | Indian National Congress |
| 2006 | A. V. Sreedharan | Indian National Congress |

== Election results ==
Vote share of winning candidates
| 2006 | 53.35% |
| 2001 | 49.23% |
| 1996 | 45.40% |
| 1991 | 59.02% |
| 1990 | 58.44% |
| 1985 | 54.05% |
| 1980 | 45.89% |
| 1977 | 54.21% |
| 1974 | 41.41% |
| 1969 | 67.64% |
| 1964 | 64.62% |

=== Assembly Election 2006 ===
2006 Pondicherry Legislative Assembly election: Palloor
| Party | Candidate | Votes | % | ±% |
|---|---|---|---|---|
| INC | A. V. Sreedharan | 5,987 | 53.35% | 4.11% |
| CPI(M) | T. K. Gangadharan | 4,512 | 40.20% | 5.81% |
| BJP | K. Sathyan | 625 | 5.57% | −3.85% |
| AIADMK | Sadgamayil K. Lakshmanan | 93 | 0.83% | |
| Margin of victory | | 1,475 | 13.14% | −1.69% |
| Turnout | | 11,223 | 78.14% | 7.13% |
| Registered electors | | 14,363 | | 3.39% |
| INC hold | | Swing | 4.11% | |

=== Assembly Election 2001 ===
2001 Pondicherry Legislative Assembly election: Palloor
| Party | Candidate | Votes | % | ±% |
|---|---|---|---|---|
| INC | A. V. Sreedharan | 4,855 | 49.23% | 3.83% |
| CPI(M) | P. Dineshan | 3,392 | 34.40% | |
| BJP | C. P. Ganeshan | 929 | 9.42% | −1.56% |
| PMK | N. K. Sachindranath | 512 | 5.19% | |
| Independent | P. M. Shamsudheen | 92 | 0.93% | |
| Margin of victory | | 1,463 | 14.84% | 0.70% |
| Turnout | | 9,861 | 71.01% | 0.60% |
| Registered electors | | 13,892 | | 7.99% |
| INC hold | | Swing | -9.78% | |

=== Assembly Election 1996 ===
1996 Pondicherry Legislative Assembly election: Palloor
| Party | Candidate | Votes | % | ±% |
|---|---|---|---|---|
| INC | A. V. Sreedharan | 4,253 | 45.40% | −13.61% |
| JD | Panangatil Khader | 2,929 | 31.27% | |
| Independent | P. K. Sathyanandan | 1,131 | 12.07% | |
| BJP | C. P. Ganeshan | 1,029 | 10.99% | 1.42% |
| Margin of victory | | 1,324 | 14.13% | −13.47% |
| Turnout | | 9,367 | 74.44% | 4.03% |
| Registered electors | | 12,864 | | 7.43% |
| INC hold | | Swing | -13.61% | |

=== Assembly Election 1991 ===
1991 Pondicherry Legislative Assembly election: Palloor
| Party | Candidate | Votes | % | ±% |
|---|---|---|---|---|
| INC | A. V. Sreedharan | 4,922 | 59.02% | 0.57% |
| JD | K. M. Raju Master | 2,620 | 31.41% | |
| BJP | C. P. Ganeshan | 798 | 9.57% | 1.85% |
| Margin of victory | | 2,302 | 27.60% | −2.37% |
| Turnout | | 8,340 | 70.41% | −6.31% |
| Registered electors | | 11,974 | | 0.83% |
| INC hold | | Swing | 0.57% | |

=== Assembly Election 1990 ===
1990 Pondicherry Legislative Assembly election: Palloor
| Party | Candidate | Votes | % | ±% |
|---|---|---|---|---|
| INC | A. V. Sreedharan | 5,288 | 58.44% | 4.40% |
| Independent | K. Gangadharan | 2,576 | 28.47% | |
| BJP | K. P. Chandran | 698 | 7.71% | |
| JD | P. Sreedharan Nambiar | 476 | 5.26% | |
| Margin of victory | | 2,712 | 29.97% | 3.81% |
| Turnout | | 9,048 | 76.72% | −4.85% |
| Registered electors | | 11,876 | | 38.29% |
| INC hold | | Swing | 4.40% | |

=== Assembly Election 1985 ===
1985 Pondicherry Legislative Assembly election: Palloor
| Party | Candidate | Votes | % | ±% |
|---|---|---|---|---|
| INC | A. V. Sreedharan | 3,766 | 54.05% | |
| JP | T. K. Chandrashekaran | 1,943 | 27.88% | |
| Independent | C. P. Pokku Haje | 802 | 11.51% | |
| Independent | Kunnummal Sreedharan | 309 | 4.43% | |
| Independent | P. N. K. Satheeshan | 87 | 1.25% | |
| Margin of victory | | 1,823 | 26.16% | 24.37% |
| Turnout | | 6,968 | 81.57% | 1.50% |
| Registered electors | | 8,588 | | 19.46% |
| INC gain from INC(I) | | Swing | 8.16% | |

=== Assembly Election 1980 ===
1980 Pondicherry Legislative Assembly election: Palloor
| Party | Candidate | Votes | % | ±% |
|---|---|---|---|---|
| INC(I) | N. K. Sachindranath | 2,567 | 45.89% | |
| INC(U) | A. V. Sreedharan | 2,467 | 44.10% | |
| Independent | T. K. Chandrashekaran | 540 | 9.65% | |
| Margin of victory | | 100 | 1.79% | −8.78% |
| Turnout | | 5,594 | 80.07% | −0.67% |
| Registered electors | | 7,189 | | 9.16% |
| INC(I) gain from Independent | | Swing | -8.32% | |

=== Assembly Election 1977 ===
1977 Pondicherry Legislative Assembly election: Palloor
| Party | Candidate | Votes | % | ±% |
|---|---|---|---|---|
| Independent | T. K. Chandrashekaran | 2,853 | 54.21% | |
| INC | Vanmeri Nadeyi Purushothaman | 2,297 | 43.64% | 2.23% |
| Independent | K. K. Govindan Nambiar | 109 | 2.07% | |
| Margin of victory | | 556 | 10.56% | −8.24% |
| Turnout | | 5,263 | 80.73% | −5.37% |
| Registered electors | | 6,586 | | 16.20% |
| Independent gain from INC | | Swing | 12.79% | |

=== Assembly Election 1974 ===
1974 Pondicherry Legislative Assembly election: Palloor
| Party | Candidate | Votes | % | ±% |
|---|---|---|---|---|
| INC | Vanmeri Nadeyi Purushothaman | 1,980 | 41.41% | −26.23% |
| Independent | Mottamal Pocku | 1,081 | 22.61% | |
| Independent | Threpraveetil Natayi Karayi Sachindranath | 1,076 | 22.51% | |
| Independent | Valappkath Cheryath P. Ummercutty Haji | 644 | 13.47% | |
| Margin of victory | | 899 | 18.80% | −16.48% |
| Turnout | | 4,781 | 86.10% | 3.40% |
| Registered electors | | 5,668 | | 20.06% |
| INC hold | | Swing | -26.23% | |

=== Assembly Election 1969 ===
1969 Pondicherry Legislative Assembly election: Palloor
| Party | Candidate | Votes | % | ±% |
|---|---|---|---|---|
| INC | Vanmeri Nadeyi Purushothaman | 2,609 | 67.64% | 3.03% |
| Independent | Pondeatte Anandin | 1,248 | 32.36% | |
| Margin of victory | | 1,361 | 35.29% | 6.06% |
| Turnout | | 3,857 | 82.69% | −9.49% |
| Registered electors | | 4,721 | | 14.25% |
| INC hold | | Swing | 3.03% | |

=== Assembly Election 1964 ===
1964 Pondicherry Legislative Assembly election: Palloor
| Party | Candidate | Votes | % | ±% |
|---|---|---|---|---|
| INC | Vanmeri Nadeyi Purushothaman | 2,436 | 64.62% | |
| Independent | Poothara Narayanan | 1,334 | 35.38% | |
| Margin of victory | | 1,102 | 29.23% | |
| Turnout | | 3,770 | 92.18% | |
| Registered electors | | 4,132 | | |
| INC win (new seat) | | | | |
