= Ariankuppam Assembly constituency =

Constituency of the Puducherry legislative assembly in India

Coordinates: 11.893°N 79.808°E

Ariankuppam
- Constituency No. 19 for the Puducherry Legislative Assembly
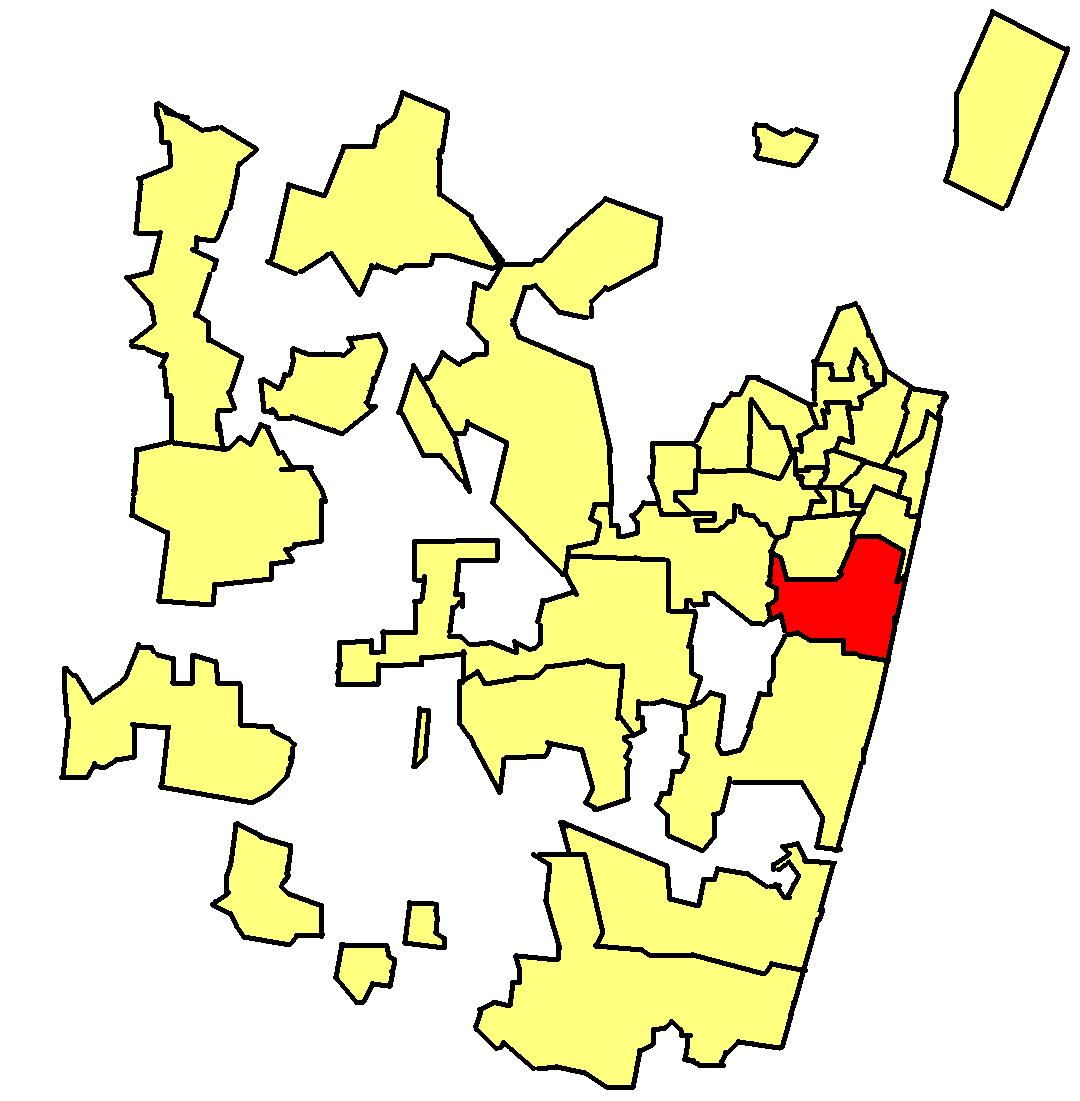

Constituency details
- Country: India
- Region: South India
- Union Territory: Puducherry
- District: Puducherry
- Lok Sabha constituency: Puducherry
- Established: 1964
- Total electors: 39,001
- Reservation: None

Member of Legislative Assembly
- 16th Puducherry Legislative Assembly
- Incumbent R. Baskar Datchanamourtty
- Party: AINRC
- Alliance: NDA
- Elected year: 2021

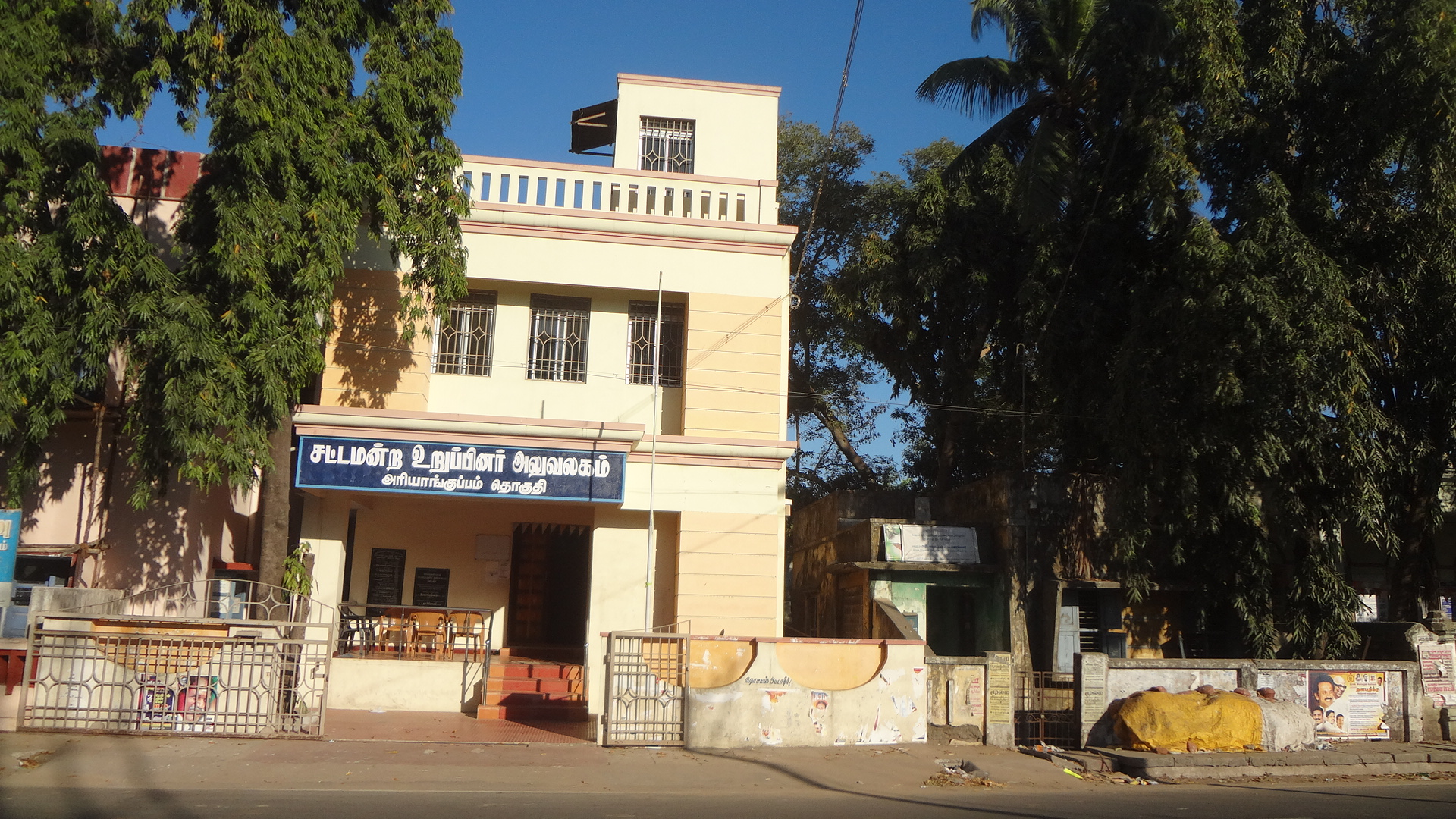
Ariyankuppam MLA Office

Ariankuppam is a legislative assembly constituency in the Union territory of Puducherry in India. Ariankuppam Assembly constituency is part of Puducherry Lok Sabha constituency.

== Members of Legislative Assembly ==
Year	Member	Political party
1964	P. Rathinavelu	Indian National Congress
1969	S. Perumal	Dravida Munnetra Kazhagam
1974	P. C. Purushothaman	Indian National Congress
1977	P. Subbarayan	Dravida Munnetra Kazhagam
1980	P. Subbarayan	Dravida Munnetra Kazhagam
1985	P. Purushothaman	All India Anna Dravida Munnetra Kazhagam
1990	A. Bakthkavachalam	Janata Dal
1991	P. Subbarayan	Dravida Munnetra Kazhagam
1996	S. Ramsingh	Pattali Makkal Katchi
2001	T Jayamurthy	Independent
2006	R. K. R. Anantharaman	Pattali Makkal Katchi
2011	V. Sabapathyn	All India N.R. Congress
2016	T Jayamurthy	Indian National Congress
2021	R. Baskar Datchanamourtty	All India N.R. Congress
2026	C. Aiyappan	All India N.R. Congress

== Election results ==
Vote share of winning candidates
2021	54.32%
2016	45.20%
2011	49.12%
2006	51.39%
2001	45.23%
1996	37.86%
1991	35.59%
1990	33.88%
1985	43.46%
1980	57.57%
1977	34.86%
1974	37.06%
1969	50.11%
1964	48.82%

=== 2026 ===
2026 Puducherry Legislative Assembly election: Ariankuppam
Party	Candidate	Votes	%	±%
AINRC	C. Aiyappan @ Mouttayappan	14,210	41.18	
INC	Vizayalakshmy Djeamourthy	13,607	39.43	
TVK	Kumaravelu	5,424	15.72	
NOTA	None of the above	262	0.76	
IND	Selvakumar V.	137	0.40	
IND	A. Ragu @ Ragunathan	107	0.31	
NAMK (Note: Naadaalum Makkal Katchi)	Rathinam	94	0.27	
IND	L. Manivannan	61	0.18	
IND	Venkatesh Babu	57	0.17	
IND	B. Narayanan	55	0.16	
PMK	L. G. Sekar	34	0.10	
Majority		603	1.75	
Turnout		34,510	92.03	
AINRC hold		Swing		

=== Assembly Election 2021 ===
2021 Puducherry Legislative Assembly election: Ariankuppam
Party	Candidate	Votes	%	±%
AINRC	R. Baskar Datchanamourtty	17,858	54.32%	
INC	T. Jayamoorthy	11,440	34.80%	−10.40%
MNM	V. Ruthrakumaran	1,055	3.21%	
Independent	S. Kumaravelu	823	2.50%	
NOTA	Nota	382	1.16%	−0.38%
Margin of victory		6,418	19.52%	−1.65%
Turnout		32,874	84.23%	−2.33%
Registered electors		39,027		8.85%
AINRC gain from INC		Swing	9.12%	

=== Assembly Election 2016 ===
2016 Puducherry Legislative Assembly election: Ariankuppam
Party	Candidate	Votes	%	±%
INC	T. Jayamoorthy	14,029	45.20%	5.74%
AIADMK	Dr. M. A. S. Subramanian	7,458	24.03%	
AINRC	V. Sabapathy @ Kothandaraman	7,248	23.35%	
Independent	S. Kumaravelu	501	1.61%	
NOTA	None of the Above	478	1.54%	
PMK	G. Lakshmanan	297	0.96%	
BJP	C. Deivassigamany	228	0.73%	0.09%
MDMK	A. Chandirasegaran	208	0.67%	
Independent	R. Ganesan	171	0.55%	
Independent	G. Thamizhvendhan	141	0.45%	
Margin of victory		6,571	21.17%	11.51%
Turnout		31,036	86.56%	−1.39%
Registered electors		35,854		15.77%
INC gain from AINRC		Swing	-3.92%	

=== Assembly Election 2011 ===
2011 Puducherry Legislative Assembly election: Ariankuppam
Party	Candidate	Votes	%	±%
AINRC	V. Sabapathy @ Kothandaraman	13,381	49.12%	
INC	T. Jayamoorthy	10,750	39.47%	
Independent	S. Kumaravelu	2,581	9.48%	
Independent	G. C. Chandran	225	0.83%	
BJP	P. Nagaradjou	176	0.65%	0.15%
IJK	G. Sathiyanandham	126	0.46%	
Margin of victory		2,631	9.66%	2.70%
Turnout		27,239	87.95%	−1.37%
Registered electors		30,970		6.77%
AINRC gain from PMK		Swing	-2.26%	

=== Assembly Election 2006 ===
2006 Pondicherry Legislative Assembly election: Ariankuppam
Party	Candidate	Votes	%	±%
PMK	R. K. R. Anantharaman	13,314	51.39%	25.38%
PMC	T. Jayamoorthy	11,512	44.43%	
DMDK	S. Kumaravelu	485	1.87%	
Independent	M. Jayamoorthi	301	1.16%	
BJP	S. Jalendiran	128	0.49%	
Margin of victory		1,802	6.95%	−12.27%
Turnout		25,910	89.32%	15.21%
Registered electors		29,007		−0.74%
PMK gain from Independent		Swing	6.16%	

=== Assembly Election 2001 ===
2001 Pondicherry Legislative Assembly election: Ariankuppam
Party	Candidate	Votes	%	±%
Independent	T. Jayamoorthy	9,790	45.23%	
PMK	K. R. Anantharaman	5,628	26.00%	−11.86%
DMK	S. Ilangovan	3,371	15.57%	−16.89%
INC	K. Vinayagamourthy	1,794	8.29%	
MDMK	T. Sadagopan	327	1.51%	
Independent	A. S. Coumaravelou	267	1.23%	
Independent	R. Jayamurthy	260	1.20%	
CPI(M)	Durai Arumugam	208	0.96%	
Margin of victory		4,162	19.23%	13.83%
Turnout		21,645	74.12%	4.72%
Registered electors		29,222		14.64%
Independent gain from PMK		Swing	9.64%	

=== Assembly Election 1996 ===
1996 Pondicherry Legislative Assembly election: Ariankuppam
Party	Candidate	Votes	%	±%
PMK	S. Ramsingh	7,382	37.86%	9.46%
DMK	T. Jayamoorthy	6,329	32.46%	−3.13%
AIADMK	S. Sreedharan	3,770	19.34%	5.39%
Independent	P. Purushothaman	1,754	9.00%	
Margin of victory		1,053	5.40%	−1.79%
Turnout		19,496	79.25%	9.85%
Registered electors		25,491		4.13%
PMK gain from DMK		Swing	2.27%	

=== Assembly Election 1991 ===
1991 Pondicherry Legislative Assembly election: Ariankuppam
Party	Candidate	Votes	%	±%
DMK	P. Subbarayan	5,794	35.59%	
PMK	S. Ramsing	4,624	28.40%	−1.42%
Independent	P. Purushothaman	2,873	17.65%	
AIADMK	V. Kalivaradhan	2,271	13.95%	−16.03%
JP	K. Chandrashekharan	635	3.90%	
Margin of victory		1,170	7.19%	3.29%
Turnout		16,279	69.40%	−3.46%
Registered electors		24,480		0.70%
DMK gain from JD		Swing	1.71%	

=== Assembly Election 1990 ===
1990 Pondicherry Legislative Assembly election: Ariankuppam
Party	Candidate	Votes	%	±%
JD	A. Bakthkavachalam	5,950	33.88%	
AIADMK	Gopalusamy Alias G. D. Chandran	5,265	29.98%	−13.48%
PMK	S. Ramsing	5,238	29.82%	
Independent	Arumugam Alias P. Chinnathambi	888	5.06%	
JP	A. Karthikeyan	175	1.00%	
Margin of victory		685	3.90%	0.92%
Turnout		17,563	72.85%	−8.27%
Registered electors		24,309		54.58%
JD gain from AIADMK		Swing	-9.58%	

=== Assembly Election 1985 ===
1985 Pondicherry Legislative Assembly election: Ariankuppam
Party	Candidate	Votes	%	±%
AIADMK	P. Purushothaman	5,505	43.46%	8.05%
DMK	P. Subbarayan	5,127	40.47%	−17.10%
JP	S. Narasingam	1,989	15.70%	
Margin of victory		378	2.98%	−19.19%
Turnout		12,668	81.12%	−0.82%
Registered electors		15,726		17.69%
AIADMK gain from DMK		Swing	-14.12%	

=== Assembly Election 1980 ===
1980 Pondicherry Legislative Assembly election: Ariankuppam
Party	Candidate	Votes	%	±%
DMK	P. Subbarayan	5,900	57.57%	22.71%
AIADMK	M. Pandurangan	3,628	35.40%	8.97%
INC(U)	Savoundararaja Alias Radha	390	3.81%	
Independent	V. Arumugam Alias Vinayagam	257	2.51%	
Independent	S. Perumal	73	0.71%	
Margin of victory		2,272	22.17%	14.23%
Turnout		10,248	81.94%	3.79%
Registered electors		13,362		7.78%
DMK hold		Swing	22.71%	

=== Assembly Election 1977 ===
1977 Pondicherry Legislative Assembly election: Ariankuppam
Party	Candidate	Votes	%	±%
DMK	P. Subbarayan	3,345	34.86%	1.62%
INC	G. Dharmalingam	2,583	26.92%	−10.14%
AIADMK	M. Pandurangan Rama Krishnan	2,536	26.43%	
JP	A. Bakthavachalam	1,048	10.92%	
Independent	S. Rasendiran	83	0.87%	
Margin of victory		762	7.94%	4.12%
Turnout		9,595	78.15%	−8.01%
Registered electors		12,397		12.97%
DMK gain from INC		Swing	-2.20%	

=== Assembly Election 1974 ===
1974 Pondicherry Legislative Assembly election: Ariankuppam
Party	Candidate	Votes	%	±%
INC	P. C. Purushothaman	3,364	37.06%	−12.83%
DMK	P. Subbarayan	3,017	33.24%	−16.86%
CPI	Saraswati Subbiah	2,460	27.10%	
CPI(M)	P. Chakrapani	235	2.59%	
Margin of victory		347	3.82%	3.61%
Turnout		9,076	86.16%	1.46%
Registered electors		10,974		20.86%
INC gain from DMK		Swing	-13.04%	

=== Assembly Election 1969 ===
1969 Pondicherry Legislative Assembly election: Ariankuppam
Party	Candidate	Votes	%	±%
DMK	S. Perumal	3,774	50.11%	
INC	P. C. Purushothaman	3,758	49.89%	1.07%
Margin of victory		16	0.21%	−3.27%
Turnout		7,532	84.70%	6.52%
Registered electors		9,080		0.10%
DMK gain from INC		Swing	1.28%	

=== Assembly Election 1964 ===
1964 Pondicherry Legislative Assembly election: Ariankuppam
Party	Candidate	Votes	%	±%
INC	P. Rathinavelu	3,376	48.82%	
IPF	V. Thulasingam	3,135	45.34%	
Independent	S. Sundararajan	360	5.21%	
Independent	T. Palani Gramany	44	0.64%	
Margin of victory		241	3.49%	
Turnout		6,915	78.18%	
Registered electors		9,071		
INC win (new seat)				

== See also ==
- List of constituencies of the Puducherry Legislative Assembly
- Puducherry district
