= R. Baskar Datchanamourtty =

Indian politician

Member of Puducherry Legislative Assembly
- Incumbent
- Assumed office 2 May 2021
- Preceded by: T. Jayamoorthy
- Constituency: Ariankuppam (constituency)

Personal details
- Party: All India NR Congress
- Education: 12th Pass
- Profession: Agriculture & Real Estate

R. Baskar Datchanamourtty, a politician from All India NR Congress. He was elected as a member of the Puducherry Legislative Assembly from Ariankuppam (constituency). He defeated T. Jayamoorthy of Indian National Congress by 6,418 votes in 2021 Puducherry Assembly election.
