= R. Kamalakannan =

Indian politician

R. Kamalakkannan is an Indian politician belonging to the Indian National Congress. He was elected from the Thirunallar constituency in 2016 Puducherry Legislative Assembly election. He became the minister of Agriculture, Electricity, Education including Collegiate Education, DRDA, Community Development, Fire Services and Sainik Welfare in V. Narayanasamy government.
