= J. Prakash Kumar =

Indian politician

Member of Puducherry Legislative Assembly
- Incumbent
- Assumed office 2 May 2021
- Preceded by: Vaiyapuri Manikandan
- Constituency: Muthialpet

Personal details
- Party: Tamilaga Vettri Kazhagam
- Education: Bachelor of Computer Applications
- Alma mater: Pondicherry University
- Profession: Businessman

J. Prakash Kumar is a politician from India. He was elected as a member of the Puducherry Legislative Assembly from Muthialpet (constituency). He defeated Vaiyapuri Manikandan of All India Anna Dravida Munnetra Kazhagam by 934 votes in 2021 Puducherry Assembly election.

He was represented in the National Democratic Alliance (NDA) led by the All India NR Congress has won the majority.
