= G. N. S. Rajasekaran =

Indian politician

Member of the Puducherry Legislative Assembly
- Incumbent
- Assumed office 2026
- Preceded by: P. R. Siva
- Constituency: Thirunallar

Personal details
- Party: Bharatiya Janata Party
- Profession: Politician

G. N. S. Rajasekaran is an Indian politician from Puducherry. He is a member of the Puducherry Legislative Assembly from Thirunallar representing the Bharatiya Janata Party.

== Political career ==
Rajasekaran won the Thirunallar seat in the 2026 Puducherry Legislative Assembly election as a candidate of the Bharatiya Janata Party. He received 16,829 votes and defeated R. Kamalakannan of the Indian National Congress by a margin of 9,526 votes.
