= P. Purushothaman =

Indian politician (04/08/1948–2019)

Secretary of Puducherry All India Anna Dravida Munnetra Kazhagam
- In office 2014 – 2 November 2019

Puducherry Legislative Assembly
- In office 1985–1990
- Preceded by: P. Subbarayan
- Succeeded by: A. Bakthkavachalam
- Constituency: Ariankuppam
- In office 2011–2016
- Preceded by: Constituency Established
- Succeeded by: R. K. R. Anantharaman
- Constituency: Manavely

Personal details
- Born: 1948
- Died: 2 November 2019 (aged 71)
- Party: All India Anna Dravida Munnetra Kazhagam

P. Purushothaman (c. 1948 – 2 November 2019) was an Indian politician belonging to All India Anna Dravida Munnetra Kazhagam. He was elected twice as a legislator of the Puducherry Legislative Assembly and served as the secretary of Puducherry All India Anna Dravida Munnetra Kazhagam.

== Biography ==
He born in manavely village pondicherry state he started working in DMK with is brother p subbarayan mla after that he going to ADMK Purushothaman was elected as a legislator of the Puducherry Legislative Assembly from Ariankuppam in 1985 defeating is brother subbarayan and after 26 years he was elected as a legislator of the Puducherry Legislative Assembly from Manavely in 2011. He was appointed the secretary of Puducherry All India Anna Dravida Munnetra Kazhagam in 2014.

Purushothaman was married to Jayalakshmi. They had one son name kumuthan deputy secretary of AIADMK in pondicherry stateand five daughters.

Purushothaman died on 2 November 2019 at the age of 71.
