= M. Nagathiyagarajan =

Indian politician

Manokaran Nagathiyagarajan (born 1979) is an Indian politician from Puducherry. He is a member of the Puducherry Legislative Assembly from Neravy TR Pattinam Assembly constituency in Karaikal district. He won the 2021 Puducherry Legislative Assembly election representing the Dravida Munnetra Kazhagam.

== Early life and education ==
Nagathiyagarajan is from Neravy TR Pattinam, Karaikal district, Puducherry. He is the son of K.Murali Manokaran. He studied MSc in Bio Technology at Bharathidasan University but did not complete the course. He is a farmer.

== Career ==
Nagathiyagarajan won from Neravy TR Pattinan Assembly constituency representing Dravida Munnetra Kazhagam in the 2021 Puducherry Legislative Assembly election. He polled 14,496 votes and defeated his nearest rival, V. M. C. S. Manokaran of the Bharatiya Janata Party, by a margin of 5,511 votes.
