= K. M. Purushothaman =

Indian civil servant and administrator

Administrator of Mahe
- In office 12 December 1988 – 22 April 1991
- Preceded by: A. P. Padmanabhan
- Succeeded by: S. M. Khannaji

K. M. Purushothaman was an Indian civil servant and administrator. He was the administrator of Mahe from 12 December 1988 to 22 April 1991.
