= E. Purushothaman =

Indian civil servant

Administrator of Mahe
- In office 9 January 1970 – 8 August 1972
- Preceded by: V. Krishnamurthy
- Succeeded by: Prodipto Ghosh

E. Purushothaman was an Indian civil servant and administrator. He was the administrator of the town of Mahe from 9 January 1970 to 8 August 1972.
