= V. N. Purushothaman =

Indian politician

V.N. Purushottaman
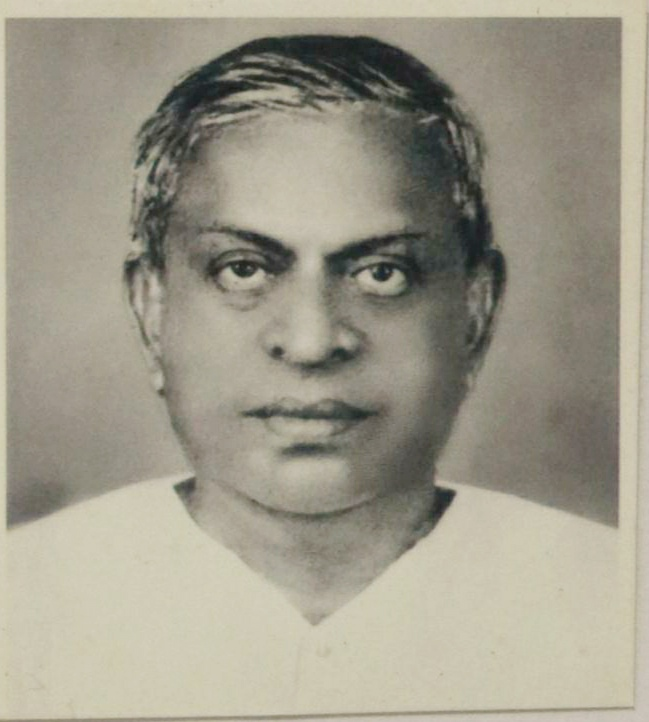

Member of the Puducherry Legislative Assembly
- In office 1964–1977
- Constituency: Palloor

Vanmeri Nadeyi Purushothaman (9 April 1909, in Mahé, Pondicherry, French India – 29 April 1990, at Pallur, Mahé) was an Indian Congress leader. He was elected as MLA several times from Palloor from 1964 to 1977. He also had held office as deputy speaker in the Pondicherry assembly between 1964 and 1968. He has been awarded the status of freedom fighter as he fought against the French during their regime in Mahe. He was reputed to be quite well-versed in the French Language.

He was the last Mayor and the first chairman of the Mahé Municipality. He is survived by his sons K.V. Jinadas, N.K. Mithran, and a daughter N.K. Rajalakhsmi.

== See also ==
- List of speakers of the Puducherry Legislative Assembly
