= B. Satyanarayanan =

Indian politician

B. Satyanarayana is an Indian politician and member of All India Anna Dravida Munnetra Kazhagam (AIADMK). He was elected Member of the Legislative Assembly (MLA) for the Thiyagarayanagar constituency in Chennai district, Tamil Nadu, having won the seat in the 2016 Tamil Nadu Legislative Assembly election. He lost the seat to J. Karunanithi of the Dravida Munnetra Kazhagam (DMK) in the 2021 Tamil Nadu state assembly elections by a margin of 137 votes.
