= N. Anand =

Indian politician (born 1964)

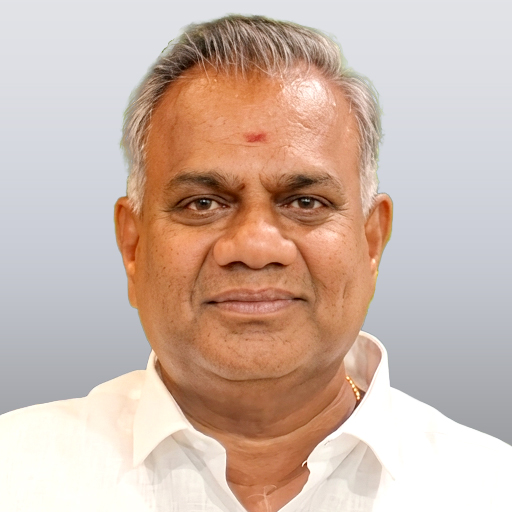

Minister for Rural Development and Water Resources Government of Tamil Nadu
- Incumbent
- Assumed office 10 May 2026
- Governor: Rajendra Arlekar
- Chief Minister: C. Joseph Vijay
- Ministry and Departments: Rural Development; Water Resources
- Preceded by: I. Periyasamy As Panchayat Raj Minister; Durai Murugan As Water Resources Minister

Member of the Tamil Nadu Legislative Assembly
- Incumbent
- Assumed office 4 May 2026
- Preceded by: J. Karunanithi (DMK)
- Constituency: Thiyagarayanagar

General Secretary of the Tamilaga Vettri Kazhagam
- Incumbent
- Assumed office 2 February 2024
- President: C. Joseph Vijay
- Preceded by: Position established

Member of Puducherry Legislative Assembly
- In office 11 May 2006 – 13 May 2011
- Preceded by: Annibal Kennedy, DMK
- Succeeded by: constituency abolished
- Constituency: Bussy

General Secretary Of Vijay Makkal Iyakkam
- In office 26 July 2009 – 28 February 2021
- Preceded by: "Position established"
- Succeeded by: "Office abolished"

Personal details
- Born: Narayanasamy Anand; 18 July 1964 (age 62) Pondicherry, India
- Party: Tamilaga Vettri Kazhagam (2024–present)
- Other political affiliations: Puducherry Munnetra Congress; All India N.R. Congress
- Relations: Son-in-law: Chandra Balan
- Parent: D. Narayanasamy (father)
- Education: Calve College, Puducherry
- Occupation: Politician
- Nickname: Bussy Anand

Narayanasamy Anand (born 18 July 1964), popularly known as Bussy Anand, is an Indian politician and the General Secretary of the Tamilaga Vettri Kazhagam (TVK). He is serving as a Cabinet Minister in the Government of Tamil Nadu, holding the portfolio of Rural Development and Water Resources. He is also the elected Member of Legislative Assembly (MLA) representing the Thiyagarayanagar assembly constituency in Chennai, having won the seat in the 2026 Tamil Nadu Legislative Assembly election. He previously served as a Member of the Puducherry Legislative Assembly from the Bussy constituency in the Union Territory of Puducherry.

== Political career ==
=== Early career and Puducherry politics ===
Anand began his political career with the Puducherry Munnetra Congress (PMC). He was elected to the Puducherry Legislative Assembly from the Bussy constituency in the 2006 Pondicherry Legislative Assembly election, defeating DMK's Annibal Kennedy. The constituency was subsequently abolished after delimitation. He later contested from the Oupalam constituency in the 2011 and 2016 elections, first as an independent and then under the All India N.R. Congress (AINRC), but was unsuccessful on both occasions.

=== Tamilaga Vettri Kazhagam ===
On 2 February 2024, when actor Vijay launched the Tamilaga Vettri Kazhagam (TVK), Anand was appointed as the party's inaugural General Secretary, a position he continues to hold. In this capacity, he has been a prominent spokesperson for the party, and ahead of the 2026 elections publicly declared that TVK's leader would assume office as Chief Minister of Tamil Nadu.

=== 2026 Tamil Nadu Legislative Assembly election ===
In the 2026 Tamil Nadu Legislative Assembly election, Anand contested from the Thiyagarayanagar assembly constituency in Chennai, a constituency historically alternating between the DMK and the AIADMK. He defeated DMK's Raja Anbazhagan to win the seat, securing 51,632 votes.

2026 Tamil Nadu Legislative Assembly election: T. Nagar
| Party | Candidate | Votes | % | ±% |
|---|---|---|---|---|
| TVK | N. Anand | 51,632 | 38.55 | New |
| AIADMK | B. Sathyanarayanan | 38,605 | 28.83 | ▼12.12 |
| DMK | Raja Anbazhagan | 37,017 | 27.64 | ▼13.41 |
| NTK | V. Anusha | 4,554 | 3.40 | ▼2.67 |
| NOTA | NOTA | 878 | 0.66 | ▼0.52 |
| Margin of victory | | 13,027 | 9.72 | ▲9.62 |
| Turnout | | 1,33,928 | 84.34 | ▲28.63 |
| Registered electors | | 1,58,791 | | ▼86,214 |
| TVK gain from DMK | | Swing | ▲38.55 | |

== Electoral history ==
| Elections | Constituency | Party | Result | Vote % | Opposition Candidate | Opposition Party | Opposition Vote % | Notes |
|---|---|---|---|---|---|---|---|---|
| 2006 Pondicherry Legislative Assembly election | Bussy | PMC | Won | 54.06 | Annibal Kennedy | DMK | 43.55 | |
| 2011 Puducherry Legislative Assembly election | Oupalam | Independent | Lost | 28.28 | A. Anbalagan | AIADMK | 42.59 | |
| 2016 Puducherry Legislative Assembly election | Oupalam | AINRC | Lost | 20.07 | A. Anbalagan | AIADMK | 39.95 | |
| 2026 Tamil Nadu Legislative Assembly election | Thiyagarayanagar | TVK | Won | 38.55 | B. Sathiyanarayanan | AIADMK | 28.83 | |
