= COVID-19 pandemic in Tamil Nadu =

- Disease: COVID-19
- Pathogen: SARS-CoV-2
- Location: Tamil Nadu, India
- First outbreak: Wuhan, Hubei, China
- Index case: Chennai and Erode
- Arrival date: 20 December 2019
- Confirmed cases: 28,68,500 As of January 14, 2022
- Active cases: 1,03,610 As of January 14, 2022
- Recovered: 27,27,960 As of January 14, 2022
- Deaths: 60,930 As of April 04, 2022
- Fatality rate: 2.12%
- Territories: All 38 districts (Note: Cases from newly split Mayiladuthurai district is officially reported along with its parent district Nagapattinam)

Government website
- stopcorona.tn.gov.in Tamil Nadu COVID-19 Public dashboard

The first case of the COVID-19 pandemic in the Indian state of Tamil Nadu was reported on 7 March 2020.

The largest single-day spike (36,987 cases) was reported on 13 May 2021 and Tamil Nadu now has the fourth highest number of confirmed cases in India after Maharashtra, Kerala and Karnataka. All 38 districts of the state are affected by the pandemic, with capital district Chennai being the worst affected.

As per the Health Department, 88% of the patients are asymptomatic while 84% of deaths were among those with co-morbidities. In June, the state saw a surge in deaths with 209 deaths (36% of the state's recorded deaths) occurring between 11 and 16 June 2020. Another large local cluster in Koyambedu of Chennai was identified in May 2020.

The state government has responded to the outbreak by following a contact-tracing, testing and surveillance model. The state has 85 laboratories approved by Indian Council of Medical Research (ICMR), capable of conducting tests.The state was under a lockdown since 25 March which was relaxed to an extent from 4 May onwards. The lockdown was further extended until 30 June with significant relaxations from 1 June 2020. The state enforced a stricter lockdown in four majorly-affected districts, which included Chennai and its three neighbouring districts of Chengalpattu, Thiruvallur and Kancheepuram from 19 to 30 June 2020.

== Timeline of events ==
=== March ===
Major events in COVID19 pandemic in Tamil Nadu till 30 April
07 March	First confirmed case
15 March	Closure of commercial establishments, schools and colleges
20 March	State borders closed
22 March	Janta Curfew - Nationwide
24 March	Section 144 imposed
25 March	First reported death Nationwide lockdown imposed till 14 April
31 March	100 confirmed cases First case identified from Sivan Temple function
11 April	10 reported deaths
12 April	1000 confirmed cases
14 April	Nationwide lockdown extended till 3 May
15 April	100 reported recoveries
21 April	500 reported recoveries
25 April	Reported recoveries surpassed active cases
26 April	1000 reported recoveries
28 April	25 reported deaths 2000 confirmed cases

The first case of coronavirus was confirmed on 7 March in a resident from Kanchipuram in Chennai. He had returned from Oman and started developing symptoms including fever and cough. He was isolated in Rajiv Gandhi Government General Hospital. Later, on 10 March, he recovered and tested negative.

After more than a week without new cases, on 18 March, the second person who had travelled by train from Delhi to Chennai confirmed positive. He did not have any history of foreign travel and was described as a domestic case by the state health minister C. Vijayabaskar.

On 19 March, a 21-year-old student who returned from Ireland tested positive.

On 21 March, a further three were confirmed positive - A Chennai man who had travelled from New Zealand and two Thailand nationals in Erode. They were admitted to IRT Hospital in Perundurai in Erode. More than 300 people who had come in contact with the three patients were quarantined.

On 25 March, the first virus-related death in the state was reported after a 54-year-old man in Madurai died. Five others were infected - four Indonesians and their travel guide from Chennai. The five were in quarantine since 22 March in Salem Medical College.

On 28 March, a 21-year-old youth who had just returned from a trip to Dublin, Ireland was discharged from the hospital. Two new cases - one each in Kumbakonam and Katpadi were reported. With this, the total number of confirmed cases had reached 40 in the state.

On 29 March, the state reported eight more cases (four each from Coimbatore and Erode), all of which were linked to the two Thai nationals and their group who had tested positive. The eight included a 10-month-old baby. The total number of confirmed cases reached 50.

On 30 March, 17 new cases were reported, highest to date in the state - 10 male patients from Erode, all of whom have travelled to Delhi were in contact with the Thailand tourists, 5 in Chennai and 1 each in Karur and Madurai.

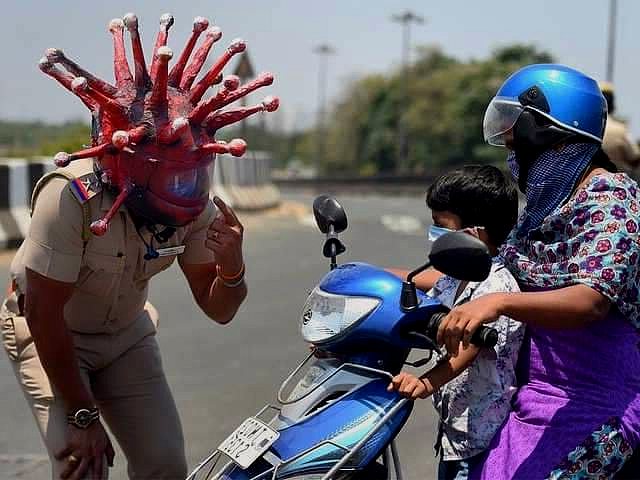
A police official in Chennai wearing a unique 'Corona' helmet to dissuade commuters from venturing out during the lockdown.

On 31 March, 57 new cases were reported, all with a history of travel predominately to Delhi, bringing the total to 124. It was the highest single day rise to date. 50 of these cases were from Namakkal (18), Tirunelveli (22), Kanyakumari (4) Villupuram (3), Madurai (2) and Thoothukudi (1), all had travel history to Delhi. Officials had discovered that at least 80 out of 124 confirmed cases (79 per cent) in Tamil Nadu were from one cluster as they are direct or indirect contact of the two Thai nationals who had tested positive for on 21 March. The Thai nationals, identified as patients 5 and 6 were part of a large group from countries including Thailand, Indonesia, Malaysia, etc. who had visited the state for an annual pilgrimage. This group had also attended a 3-day Tablighi Jamaat congregation in Nizamuddin Markaz mosque, New Delhi in early March. It was estimated that more than 1,500 people from the state had participated in this event. Officials also confirmed that the 54-year-old patient who had died the previous week had also participated in the gathering. Of 1,500 people who were in the gathering, 1,130 had returned to the state. The government had identified and isolated 515 of the 1,130 people. It faced difficulty while trying to map the rest. It had urged people who attended the gathering to step forward and get tested. Following this, the Nizamuddin Markaz emerged as a new virus hotspot.

=== April ===
On 1 April, the state reported 110 new cases, all attended the Delhi Nizamuddin event. The total became 234. Health Secretary Beela Rajesh said that 1103 out of 1500 attendees of the event had been traced and isolated. 658 of their samples had been tested of which,190 tested positive. Some of the participants approached officials themselves after government's request. Family members and close contacts were either taken to quarantine facilities or home quarantined.

On 2 April, 75 new cases were reported, of which 74 of them attended Tablighi Jamaat in Delhi.

On 3 April, 102 new cases were reported, of which 100 were Delhi event participants. Two others were from Chennai, one with co-morbid condition and one US-returnee.

On 4 April, 74 new cases were reported, of which 69 were Delhi event participants, 4 were contacts of the event participants. One was from Chennai. Two more deaths were reported, a 51 years old male who attended Tablighi Jamaat at Villupuram and a female at Theni Government hospital.

On 5 April, 86 new cases were reported of which 85 are related to Delhi event directly or indirectly. A 71 year old from Ramanathapuram who died on Thursday was tested positive. A 60 year old also died in the same hospital as previous patient. The Health department revealed that 1246 contacts of Tablighi Jamaat participants have been traced and isolated so far.

On 6 April, 50 new cases were reported bringing the total cases to 621. 48 of them were returnees of Delhi event. 101 people who attended a COVID-19 victim's burial were home-quarantined in Ramanathapuram. They were not aware of his condition as the test result returned positive after only two days his burial.

On 7 April, 69 new cases were reported, of which 63 were related to Delhi event.

On 8 April, 48 new cases were reported bringing total to 738. 42 of those are connected to Tablighi Jamaat in Delhi. One among the 42 is a Malaysian national. Government had revealed that 1480 attendees of the Delhi event were traced and isolated. 1716 samples from them and their contacts were tested, of which 679 had returned positive.

On 9 April, the state reported 96 new cases which brought the total cases to 834.

On 10 April, 77 new cases were reported bringing total to 911. 17 cases were clinically recovered, bringing the total recovered to 44.

On 11 April, 58 new cases were reported bringing the total to 969 of which, 47 belonged to the Delhi cluster. One more died in IRT Government Hospital at Perundurai in Erode, taking the death toll to 10. The state government revealed that it will decide on the lockdown extension based on Centre's announcement.

On 12 April, 106 new cases were reported bringing the total to 1075. One death was reported, a 45-year-old women died on previous day evening, she was undergoing treatment at a Government Hospital in Chennai. The new infections were found in clusters in Chennai - where four were primary sources and Coimbatore - where two primary sources were identified. According to the health department, of the 106 new cases, 90 contracted the infection from them 16 people who had travel history.

On 13 April, 98 new cases were reported bringing the total to 1173.

On 14 April, 31 new cases were reported bringing the total to 1204. It was the lowest daily rise since 31 March. A 96-year-old died, making the total of 12 deaths in the state.

On 15 April, 38 new cases were reported in the state of which, 34 were related to Delhi cluster. Deaths of two men were reported, a 47-year-old man with SARI in Stanley Government hospital, Chennai and a 59-year-old man in a private hospital, making the total of 14 deaths in the state.

On 16 April, 25 new cases were reported bringing total to 1267. One death was reported making total of 15 deaths in the state

On 17 April, 56 new cases were reported which brought the total to 1323.

On 18 April, 49 new cases were reported which brought the total to 1372. 82 patients were discharged making total recovered cases as 365. On 19 April, 105 new cases were reported, third highest daily increase to date. 46 patients were discharged making total recovered cases as 411.

On 20 April, 43 new cases reported in Tamil Nadu bringing the total cases in Tamil Nadu to 1,520. The infection rate in the state had dropped from 13% on 1 April 2020 to 3.6%.

On 22 April, 33 new cases reported in Tamil Nadu bringing the total cases to 1,629. 27 patients were discharged making total discharged to 662. No death were reported for the day.

On 23 April, Dharmapuri district reported its first COVID-19 case, 54 new cases were reported in the state bringing the total cases to 1,683. 2 more died. 90 patients were discharged making total discharged to 752.

On 24 April, 72 new cases were reported, of which 52 cases are from Chennai, Total confirmed cases stood at 1755. 2 more died which took the total fatality to 22. 114 patients were discharged making total discharged to 886.

On 28 April, with 121 new reported cases, the total number crossed 2000 to become 2058. Chennai continued to be the worst-hit district with 103 new cases. It had 673 cases, which was 33% of all the cases in Tamil Nadu.

=== May ===
Major events in COVID19 pandemic in Tamil Nadu since 30 April
First week of May	Koyambedu Wholesale Market Complex cluster identified
2 May	Active cases again surpasses recoveries
3 May	3000 confirmed cases
5 May	4000 confirmed cases
6 May	1500 reported recoveries
8 May	5000 confirmed cases
11 May	8000 confirmed cases
15 May	10000 confirmed cases
29 May	20000 confirmed cases
6 June	30000 confirmed cases
17 June	50000 confirmed cases
27 June	1000 confirmed deaths

In May, the Koyambedu Wholesale Market Complex emerged as a new hotspot in Chennai. By 3 May, 113 infections were traced back to the market. The infected were spread across Chennai, Tiruvallur, Kancheepuram, Cuddalore and Chengalpattu districts as there were loaders who travelled out of Chennai even during the lockdown. Areas around Koyambedu were sealed and the infected vendors' contacts were being traced. Thiruvanmiyur market in South Chennai was also closed after a vegetable vendor who used to visit Koyambedu market tested positive.

On 6 May, 771 cases were reported in the state, which took the total to 4829. It was the highest single day rise to date.

On 8 May, 600 new cases were reported. The Koyambedu cluster accounted for 1589 cases in the state.

On 11 May, with 798 new cases, the total surpassed 8000 to become 8002 in the state. Chennai continued to be the worst-hit district. It recorded its highest single-day rise with 538 cases which brought the total to 4371. The state health minister said, "Chennai has cases from the Koyambedu cluster, front line workers cluster, hospital cluster and mediapersons cluster. Royapuram, Thiru Vi Ka Nagar, Kodambakkam and Teynampet are the four highly-affected zones in the city".

On 14 May, state reported 447 confirmed cases, of which 24 cases were among interstate and international returnees to the state.

On 15 May, state reported 434 confirmed cases, of which 49 cases were among interstate and international returnees to the state.

On 16 May, state reported 477 confirmed cases, of which 93 cases were among interstate and international returnees to the state. The state reported 939 recoveries, highest reported discharges in a single day.

On 26 May, the state reported its highest single day rise of 805, bringing the total to 17,082. Chennai accounted for more than 11,000 of the cases. The worst-affected regions of Chennai include Royapuram, Tondiarpet, Kodambakkam, Thiru Vi Ka Nagar, Anna Nagar and Teynampet.

On 30 May, 938 new cases were reported, of which 616 were from Chennai. The recovery rate have improved to around 56%, with a total of 12,000 recoveries across the state. The number of active cases stood at 9,021. 31 prisoners in Puzhal prison have tested positive.

=== June ===
On 6 June, the state recorded 1458 new cases which took the total number of cases to 30,152. It had recorded over 1000 cases consecutively in last seven days. Chennai with 20,993 total cases had about 70% of state's cases. 16,395 patients have recovered across the state.

On 9 June, the state government announced that it has cancelled the Class 10th board examinations which were scheduled to be held from June 15 and all students will be declared as passed.

On 10 June, MLA J. Anbazhagan from Dravida Munnetra Kazhagam party died due to COVID-19 in Chennai.

On 15 June, the state crossed 46,000 cases mark to reach 46,504 after recording 1843 new cases. Owing to the rise, the state government announced 12-day lockdown in four districts including Chennai, between 19 and 30 June 2020.

On 17 June, the state witnessed over 2000 new cases for the first time after recording 2174 cases. It took the total number of cases over 50,000 cases to 50,193. The state had also tested over 25,000 samples in a day, its highest ever. The private secretary of Chief Minister's Office, Damodharan died due to COVID-19. Balamurali, a police inspector from Chennai died due to COVID-19 which was the state's first police personnel death.

In mid-June, non-hotspot districts such as Madurai, Vellore, Cuddalore, Ranipet and Ramanathapuram saw rise in number of new cases. Officials thought that it might be due to the 'unlocking' of the state, mass influx of from Chennai and inter-district movement. Starting from 24 June, Madurai and Theni districts entered stricter lockdowns following the rise. The state also re-imposed restrictions on inter-district travel until June 30.

=== July ===
The total case count crossed 2 lakh mark in the state, with 2,06,737 cases on 25 July. The recovery rate was 73% while the case fatality rate was 1.65%, comparatively lower than other Indian states as of 25 July.

The case growth rate in Chennai saw a dip in July. The number of daily new cases dropped from 2400 in the first week of July to 1013 on 31 July. Recovery rate improved from 60% to 85%. The city's positivity rate stood around 9% at the end of July.

The disease spread intensified in other districts of the states like Madurai, where cases crossed 11,000 on 31 July. The districts Chennai, Kancheepuram, Chengalpattu, Tiruvallur and Madurai accounted for about 63.5% of the state's total cases.

=== August ===
The total case count crossed 2.5 lakh mark in the state, with 2,51,738 cases on 1 August. The number of confirmed cases in Chennai crossed 1 lakh mark on 2 August. On August 3, Tamil Nadu's single day COVID-19 death toll crossed the 100 mark, after registering 109 fatalities.

== Cases ==
The data below are based on Health and Family Welfare Department of Tamil Nadu daily reports.

=== By cluster ===
==== Delhi Tablighi Jamaat cluster ====
The Delhi Tablighi Jamaat cluster accounts for 1,113 cases of all reported according to the Department of Health. The first case was reported on 31 March 2020. The highest single day rise due to the cluster was on 1 April when 110 cases linked to it were reported.

==== Koyambedu cluster ====
As of 5 May 2020, the cluster accounts for over 600 cases in the state.

As of 9 May, the cluster accounts for 1867 cases in the state.

=== By demographic ===
Most infected are between the age range of 13-60 and are predominantly male.

== Testing ==
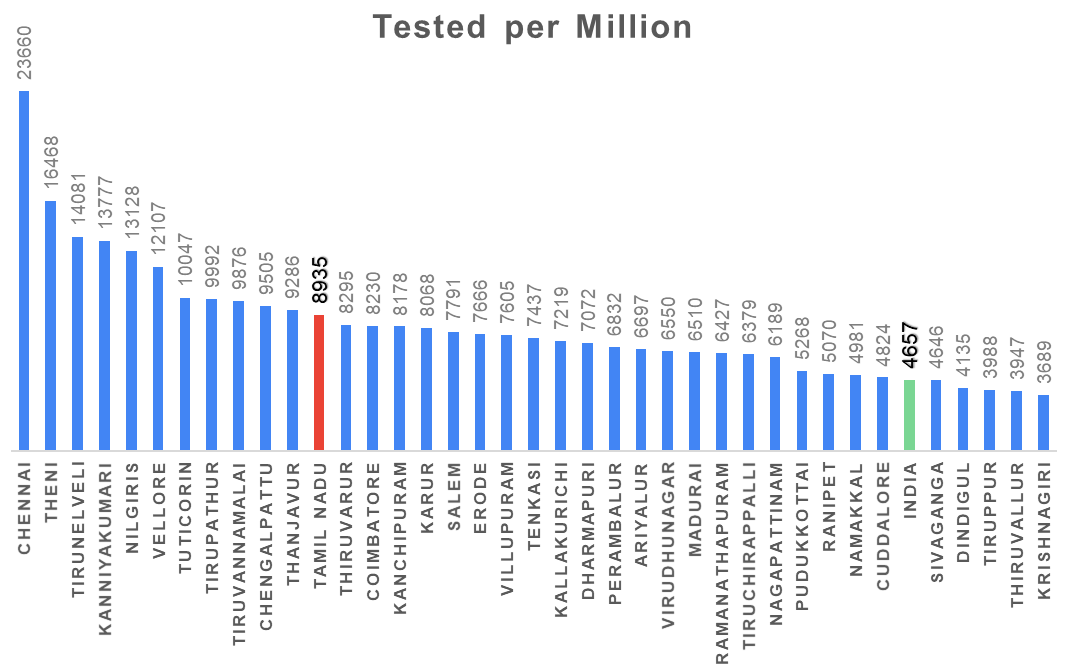
Tested per million in districts as of 20 June 2020 (Department of Health and Family Welfare)

As per the protocol set by the ICMR and the state, patients with Severe Acute Respiratory Illness (SARI) are tested for COVID-19. Their contacts are traced and quarantined; tested if they develop symptoms. If they are a high-risk contact, they are tested even if they are asymptomatic. International travel passengers and passengers from other states are tested and quarantined until their results come. If found positive, they are moved to hospitals. Health care workers are tested if they show symptoms.

During the first half of March, the state faced criticism for the low number of tests. By 16 March, it had only tested 90 samples while neighbouring Kerala and Karnataka had tested more than 1500 and 750 samples. The director of Public Health defended the state's low number of tests by saying that Kerala saw more travel from coronavirus-affected countries which is why it had detected more cases. The Public Health department had also said that the state follows test protocols established by the Union Health Ministry. Following the Delhi Nizamuddin event, the families of all identified participants were tested regardless of whether they showed symptoms or not. By 16 March, following ICMR's guidelines to test for community transmission, the state had tested 22 random samples of people with influenza and SARI for coronavirus. All tested negative. By 10 April, of 577 SARI patients tested, five were positive. In June, 199 Influenza Like Illness (ILI) cases were identified among the 3048 people who attended fever camps set up in Chennai's worst-affected Royapuram zone.

In early April, Tamil Nadu had the highest the percentage of positive samples among total samples tested in the country at 13%. It was attributed to detection of cases related to the Tablighi Jamaat gathering in Delhi. On 12 April, the state health officials changed the testing strategy to "aggressive testing", also including asymptomatic individuals for tests. The Health Secretary also said that the state will employ the 24,000 real time Reverse-Transcription Polymerase Chain Reaction (RT-PCR) test kits that it has in possession for more stringent testing. The move was welcomed health professionals. On 14 April, the Chennai Corporation revealed that it plans to collect 40,000 swab samples, including 10,000 from the containment zones. It had set up 35 walk-in kiosks for the purpose.

By 19 April, the state's number of tests per 10,000 people had increased from 0.4 on 1 April to 4.1, which was almost a seven-fold increase. In mid-May, the state was testing at a rate of 10,000 to 14,000 samples per day, on an average. The state procured 100,000 RT-PCR test kits from a South Korean firm, as part of a 10 lakh kit order. On 2 June, the chief minister Edappadi Palaniswami said that the state had received 11.51 lakh RT-PCR kits so far (of which 5.03 lakh were expended).

On 17 June, daily testing crossed 25,000 in the state for the first time. Tamil Nadu also became the first state in the country to cross the 20,000 test per day mark. Total tests to date was 773,707. Most of tests were being done in Chennai (23% of all samples) and neighboring districts. As of 8 June, the district with highest positivity rate was Chennai (18.13%), followed by Chengalpattu (13.28%), Tiruvallur (11.96) and Ariyalur (9.62%).

Amid strict 14-day lockdown from 19 to 30 June in Chennai and three other districts, the government looked to increase testing and tracing of the disease in a bid to control its spread. The chief minister said that the curbs were being used to further augment detection of COVID-19 cases in Chennai by conducting more door-to-door surveys and fever camps. On the second day of the lockdown, 33,231 samples were tested which was the state's highest in a single day.

=== Rapid test kits ===
On 6 April after ICMR's approval, the state government placed an independent order to purchase around one lakh serology-based rapid test kits from China, that can return quick results and are expected to be used for mass testing in smaller towns and rural areas. They were expected to be delivered by 9 April. On 11 April, the Chief Secretary K Shanmugam said that the consignment meant for India was reportedly diverted to the United States, causing delay. The delay affected the testing rate of the state. The director of public health K Kolandaswamy said "It is admittedly one of our biggest weakness, but we decided there is no point in waiting for the kits. We have to use every minute in this period resourcefully." Instead of waiting, the health department has decided to use the existing RT-PCR kits for mass screening.

After several delays, 24,000 rapid test kits reached Chennai on 17 April. The state aims to use it for initial testing of close contacts of people who have tested positive and in areas around the containment zones. If tested positive, their samples are sent for a confirmatory PCR test. The state had also ordered an additional 5 lakh rapid test kits and 1 lakh RT-PCR kits. In late-April, the state returned the 24,000 rapid test kits that it had purchased from the Chinese firm Guangzhou Wondfo after ICMR's advise.

Chief Minister E Palaniswami had urged Prime Minister Narendra Modi to provide COVID-19 rapid test kits and ₹1,000 crore (US$100 million) immediately to procure medical supplies in a video-conference chaired by Modi and attended by the Chief Ministers of other states on 11 April. By June, the central government had provided 50,000 testing kits the state.

=== Testing facilities ===
Initially, the state only had four government labs for conducting tests for the coronavirus. As of 20 June 2020, the state had 85 laboratories (45 government and 40 private) approved by ICMR for testing. According to reports, private labs has fixed a rate of Rs 4,500 for testing a COVID-19 sample. The state government had announced that it will bear all the expenses.

== Mathematical models ==
In late March 2020, two researchers from the University of Cambridge came up with a new mathematical model that predicts a flat 49-day countrywide lockdown or sustained lockdown with periodic relaxation extending over two months may be necessary to prevent COVID-19 resurgence in India.

In June 2020, epidemiologists at Tamil Nadu Dr. M.G.R. Medical University projected that Chennai may witness 150,000 infections and up to 1,600 deaths by the second week of July at the current rate of growth. The team also predicted that the state may record 130,000 infections and 769 deaths by 30 June 2020. Epidemiologists have also advised the government that herd immunity in Tamil Nadu is possible only if 55–60% of the population contracts a mild infection. An official said, "It means there will be many more cases and the idea is to keep the spread slow so that it can happen over many months to ensure that our health infrastructure is sufficient."

== Treatment ==
=== Diagnosis ===
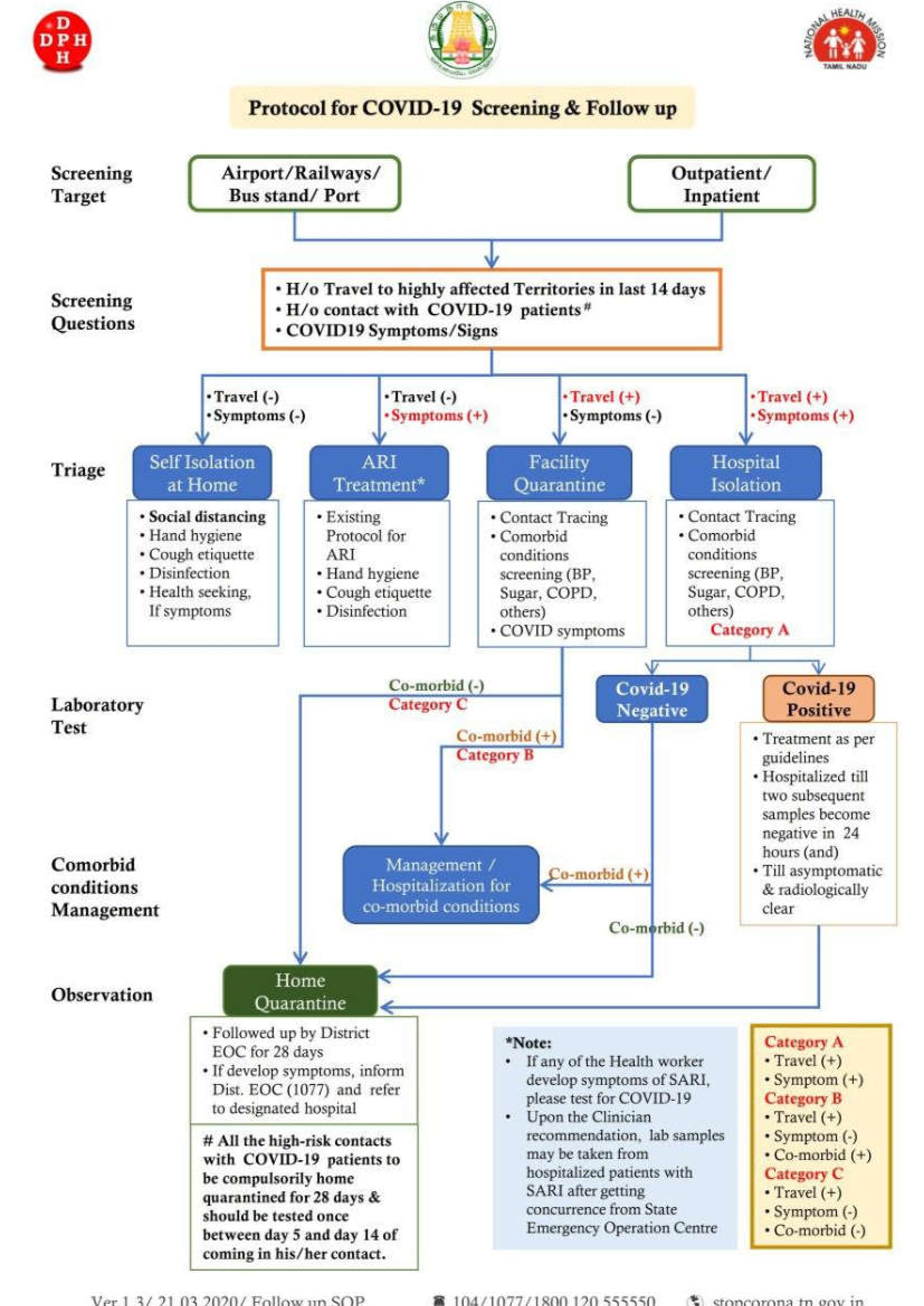
Protocol for COVID-19 Screening and Follow up

COVID-19 patients in the state are treated in four categories of facilities — severe cases require hospitalisation, moderate cases are admitted to 'health centres' and mild cases are accommodated at 'care centres'. The remaining asymptomatic cases are required to remain in home quarantine. According to a health official, about ten percent of the total active patients in the state need hospitalisation, about 20% need health centres, another 50% need care centres and the rest can go under home quarantine. He also added, "On an average, a patient with severe symptoms requires a bed for about 10 days. This means that a bed will be occupied for 10 days."

The Standard Operating Procedure (SOP) by Health & Family Welfare Department guides the medical staff in the clinical assessment of suspected COVID-19 patients. Any patient arriving with a fever, cough and difficulty in breathing is screened to determine if they are a suspect for COVID-19.

A suspect case is one of the following:

- A patient with acute respiratory illness (fever and at least one sign/symptom of respiratory disease), and a history of travel to or residence in a country/area or territory reporting local transmission of COVID-19 disease during the 14 days prior to symptom onset;
- A patient/Health care worker with any acute respiratory illness and having been in contact with a confirmed COVID-19 case in the last 14 days prior to onset of symptoms;
- A patient with severe acute respiratory infection and requiring hospitalization;
- A case for with inconclusive COVID-19 test result.

Once a patient is suspected of COVID-19, their pulse, respiratory rate, blood pressure and oxygen saturation are checked and their samples are collected for testing. The guideline defines mild and moderate-severe as follows:

Classification of patients prior to testing
Mild	Moderate to Severe (Note: If patient has one of the following)
Pulse below 100 per minute; Respiratory rate below 20 per minute; Oxygen saturation (SpO2) more than 94%; Systolic BP more than 90mm Hg; Diastolic BP more than 60mm Hg	Pulse above 100 per minute; Respiratory rate above 20 per minute; Oxygen saturation (SpO2) less than 94%; Systolic BP less than 90mm Hg; Diastolic BP less than 60mm Hg

Mild cases are admitted to standard isolation while moderate to severe are taken to critical care unit (CCU) regardless of the test result. If the results arrive positive, they are treated as per the SOP.

The contacts of the confirmed COVID-19 patients are identified and isolated.

==== Definition of contacts ====
A contact is someone who had either provided direct care without proper personal protective equipment (PPE) for a COVID-19 patient; stayed in the same close environment of a COVID-19 patient (including workplace, classroom, household, gatherings) or travelled in close proximity (1 m) with a symptomatic person who later tested positive for COVID-19. The contacts are classified into two based on the following:

Low risk contact	High risk contact
Shared the same space such as same class for school/worked in the same room/similar without having a high-risk exposure to a confirmed or suspect case of COVID-19; Travelled in the same environment (bus/train/flight/any mode of transit) but not having a highrisk- exposure.	Touched body fluids of a patient; Had direct physical contact with the body of a patient including physical examination without proper PPE; Touched or cleaned the linens, clothes, or dishes of a patient; Lives in the same household as a patient; Anyone in close proximity (within 3 ft) of a confirmed case without precautions; Passenger in close proximity (within 3 ft) of a conveyance with a symptomatic person who later tested positive for COVID-19 for more than 6 hours.

High risk-contacts are tested within 5–14 days of coming into contact. Others undergo testing if they develop symptoms. If they don't develop symptoms, they are cleared to leave isolation after 28 days.

=== Drugs ===
Drugs are given only after confirmation of the lab tests. The drugs used in the treatment of mild COVID-19 cases are Paracetamol, Oseltamavir 150 mg and antibiotics if needed. Their vitals are monitored twice a day.

For moderate to severe COVID-19 cases in CCUs, the following drugs are used:

- Azithromycin 500 mg, once daily for five days;
- Hydroxychloroquine 400 mg on day 1 followed by 200 mg, twice daily for four days (under close medical supervision with monitoring for side effects including QTc interval);
- Omeprazole 40 mg, twice daily for five days;
- Ondansetron 4 mg, twice daily for five days;
- Zinc and Vitamin C supplements;
- Paracetamol 500 mg, three times a day.
- O2 supplementation given to maintain SpO2 more than 94%

Patient's vitals are monitored closely. They are also given a nutritious diet and mental health counseling. If their condition worsens, they are shifted to intensive care unit. A patient is discharged once they are clinically stable and two of their samples taken 24 hours apart test negative.

=== Healthcare system ===
The state has 3,371 ventilators and 29,074 beds in isolation wards according to the Department of Health and Family Welfare as of April 2. It has ordered an additional 2,571 ventilators. The number of hospital beds available is 1.1 per 1000 population and 7.8 per 1000 for elderly population according to a Brookings report. As of 2 April, 21 government facilities are designated for treating COVID-19 illness cost free. As of 3 April, 25 private colleges and 110 private hospitals in the state are designated for treating COVID-19 illness. As of 15 June 2020, officials said that the state can accommodate about one lakh moderately or mildly symptomatic COVID-19 patients in schools and colleges. Government has also begun identifying more public spaces to create care facilities across the state.

The Chennai Trade Center in Nandambakkam was converted into a 550-bed COVID-19 quarantine ward on April 14. As many as 747 marriage halls and 50 schools were identified in Chennai to be converted as COVID-19 care centres. The Greater Chennai Corporation commissioner G Prakash said that the city plans to create 50,000 bed spaces to treat asymptomatic COVID-19 patients while adding that more than 98% of the cases in Chennai were asymptomatic. These milder cases will be sent to the care centres instead of a government hospital with intensive care. As of 4 May 2020, there were 4,000 such beds in Chennai at care centres and the Communicable Diseases Hospital in Tondiarpet. By 2 June, Chennai alone had 17,500 beds for COVID-19 care. The whole state had 75,000 beds.

On 7 June, the state government capped the COVID-19 treatment fees charged by private hospitals in the state. According to the issued guidelines, the maximum allowable daily treatment charges in higher grade (A1 and A2) hospitals were ₹7,500 and ₹15,000 for general and ICU wards respectively. In lower grade hospitals (A3 and A4), they were ₹5,000 and ₹15,000. On 17 June, a 400-bed COVID-19 care facility of Christian Medical College was opened in Kannigapuram, Ranipet.

== Government response ==
The state government was among the first to launch measures against COVID-19. On 30 January, it had put 78 people who arrived from China under quarantine. The state government had announced a ₹3,280 crore (equivalent to ₹39 billion or US$400 million in 2023) relief package on 24 March. It included financial support of ₹1,000 (equivalent to ₹1,200 or US$12 in 2023) to all ration card holders, free rice and other essential commodities in the wake of lockdown. It also provided registered street vendors, autorickshaw drivers, migrant labourers and construction workers in the state with similar provisions. It had also announced extension periods of three months to make loan and tax payments for all citizens, and one month to pay house rent for workers including migrants across the state. Currently, the government operates 311 relief camps and shelters for migrant workers.

Earlier, it had allocated sum of ₹60 crore (US$6.2 million) from disaster relief fund to deal with the crisis. It had also taken steps to provide medicines for the next two months to patients with hypertension, diabetes mellitus, HIV and TB while also monitoring pregnant women who are due within that time. The government had started screening passengers arriving at the airports in January. It had screened 2,10,538 passengers as of 1 April. As of 16 April, More than 1 lakh passengers have been placed under quarantine.

The government has established helplines for public. It also released an app for officials to monitor people under home quarantine. The government has announced a compensation of ₹50 lakh (US$52,000) to the families of those who die during COVID-19 duty.

On 31 March in the wake of the nationwide lockdown, the government announced a one-month rent freeze for students and workers, including migrant labourers. It also extended the time to make payments including loans and taxes by three months.

Disinfection tunnel set up in a market in Tiruppur before ban on its usage.

On 2 April, the government announced care package of ₹1,000 (equivalent to ₹1,200 or US$12 in 2023) and monthly allowed ration of food supply for each household.

On 13 April, Coimbatore district administration made usage of face masks compulsory for all.

On 26 April, the state government enacted a new ordinance to punish who try to block burial or cremation under Tamil Nadu Public Health Act, 1939.

The government agreed to allow flight operations from 25 May 2020. It limited incoming flights to Chennai International Airport to 25. Passengers showing symptoms will be subjected to tests and taken to hospitals if found positive, while ones without symptoms or with mild symptoms shall undergo 14 day home quarantine. All passengers are stamped with quarantine seals.

=== Suspensions and closedowns ===
On 15 March 2020, Chief minister Edappadi K Palaniswami ordered closure of primary schools throughout the state while shutting theatres, commercial complexes and malls. He had also ordered to close state borders with Karnataka, Kerala and Andhra Pradesh on March 20 until March 31 and constituted a task force to closely monitor the preventive measures against the viral outbreak.

On 22 March 2020, the state government extended 'Janata curfew' to Monday morning 5 am. The next day, it announced that prohibitory orders under Section 144 will start from 24 March 6 pm until March 31 which prohibits gatherings of more than 5 people. On the same day, Prime Minister Narendra Modi announced a nationwide lockdown. On 11 April, the state's chief secretary K Shanmugam said that it favoured a two-week extension of the lockdown, but would wait for PM's announcement.

==== Lockdown extensions and relaxations ====
===== 2020 =====
- 13 April, the state government extended the lock-down until 30 April.
- 20 April, the state government extended the lockdown until May 3 without any further relaxation.
- 23 April, the government issued an order to relax the lockdown in non-containment zones. This included MGNREGA works, construction in rural areas and continuous process industries including refineries, steel, glass and cement plants.
- 24 April, the Chief Minister announced that a complete lockdown would be imposed in Chennai, Coimbatore, Madurai, Salem and Tiruppur corporations. The lockdown will be in effect from 6 a.m. on 26 April to 9 p.m. on 29 April in Chennai, Coimbatore and Madurai. Meanwhile, in Salem and Tiruppur, it will be imposed from 6 a.m. on 26 April to 9 p.m. on 28 April. The statement said that except certain essential services, no shops will be allowed to open.
- 29 April, the Chief Minister announced that the regular lockdown would continue after the complete lockdown imposed until 29 April. Shops will be open from 6am to 5pm on 30 April and from May 1 onwards, shops will be only open until 1pm.
- 2 May, the state government announced the extension of lockdown from 4 May to 17 May 2020 with some relaxations. While the relaxations did not apply to containment zones (hotspots), it applied to non-containment zones inside all red, orange and green zones. Sectors like construction, textile, IT, SEZs are permitted to operate in certain locations with limited employees while adhering to social distancing. Shops dealing non-essential goods are allowed to function between 11 a.m. to 5 p.m. while essential goods shop are to be open 6 a.m. to 5 p.m. Self-employed may work after obtaining necessary permissions from district collector or city police commissioner.
- 31 May, the state extended the lockdown until 30 June. It partially allowed public transport and other relaxations in districts except Chennai, Kancheepurm, Tiruvallur and Chengalpattu. The lockdown still prohibits places of worship, shopping malls, metro rails, interstate bus and suburban train services from functioning across the state.
- 15 June, strict quarantine in the containment zones from 19 to 30 June was announced by the government after recommendation from an expert medical panel in four districts worst hit by the pandemic. The districts include, Chennai, Kanchipuram, Chengalpattu and Tiruvallur. All previously applied relaxations are to be negated. Experts in the panel met with the CM, said that the spread in Tamil Nadu was at its peak and cases will decline but warned about a possible second wave of infection in next three to four months. Through a special notification that was issued by the state's Chief Secretary, these districts had to face an intense lockdown due to an increase in COVID-19 cases "due to the large urban population and also the fact that in many zones the houses are located in close proximity and the average living space is also small". As per Chennai City police commissioner, people are not to be allowed to use private vehicles unless for a medical emergency.
- 25 June, the state again curbed the inter-district movement of the state transport corporation's buses and private vehicles as a strategy to control the spread of new COVID-19 cases in the state.
- 30 July, the lockdown was further extended until 31 August 2020 with added relaxations.

=== Sanitisation Measures ===
State government also responded by undertaking various sanitation measures. The fire services department is amongst the key government agencies undertaking the disinfecting drives. Various means and modes have been used including disinfectant tunnels, drones, and royal enfields. In the early weeks of COVID's incidence in the state, some of the cities had set up disinfectant tunnels however once the harmful impact of these tunnels (their chemicals) was known, Tamil Nadu government advised the District Collectors to discontinue their use. The state also is using the drones to disinfect parts of the state. For example, drones were used to disinfect crowded parts of Chennai. Similarly, mist cannons (trucks carrying huge blowers), butterfly sprinklers were also used. Jet spray guns mounted on vehicles were also used in narrow lanes to spray disinfectants. Recently, Chief Minister Edappadi K Palaniswami inaugurated the use of nine Royal Enfield bikes which were fitted with disinfectant sprayers. They are to be used in the narrow streets of containment zones.

=== Containment measures ===
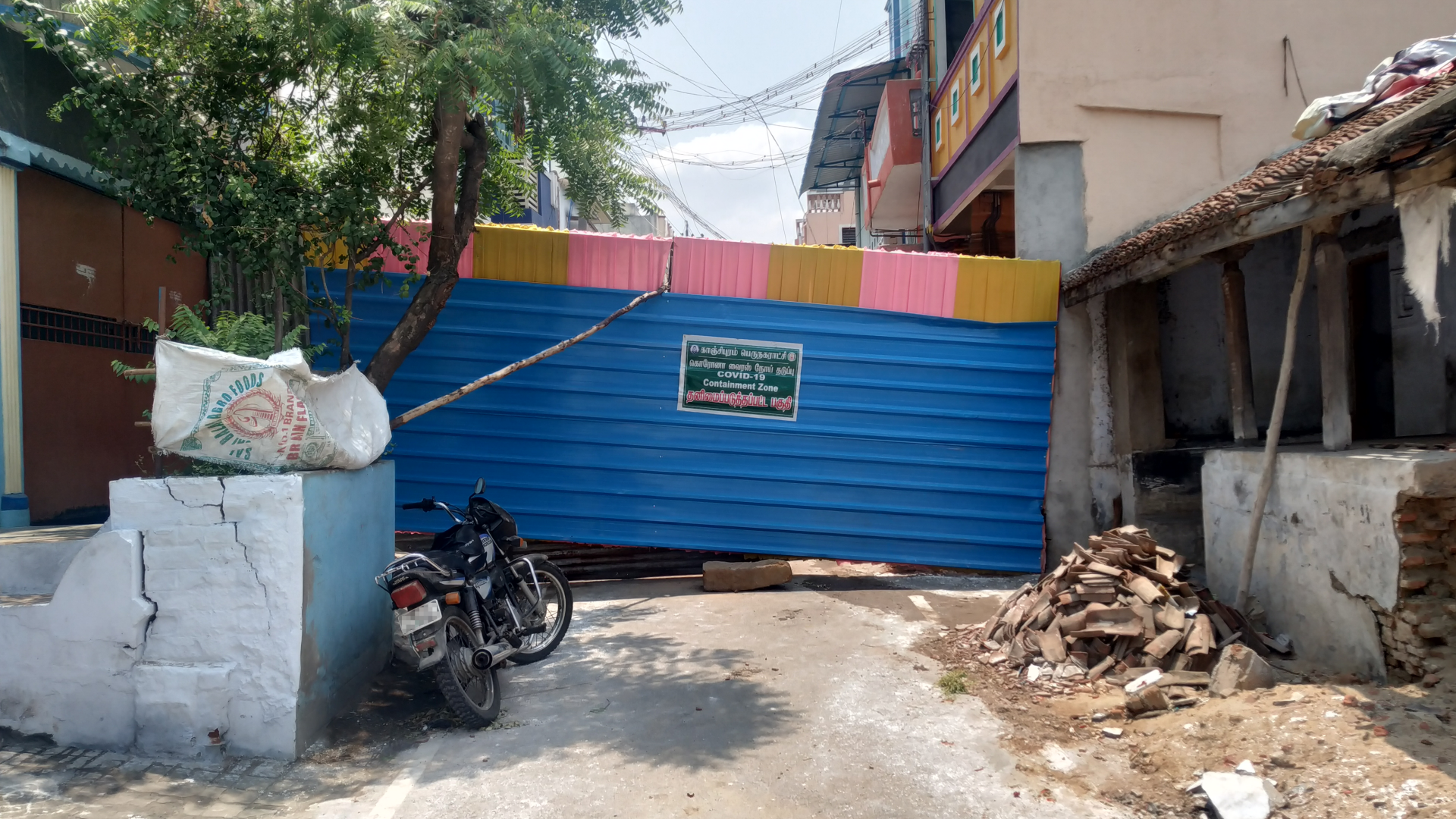
A street is closed-off by municipality in Kanchipuram as a containment measure in April 2020

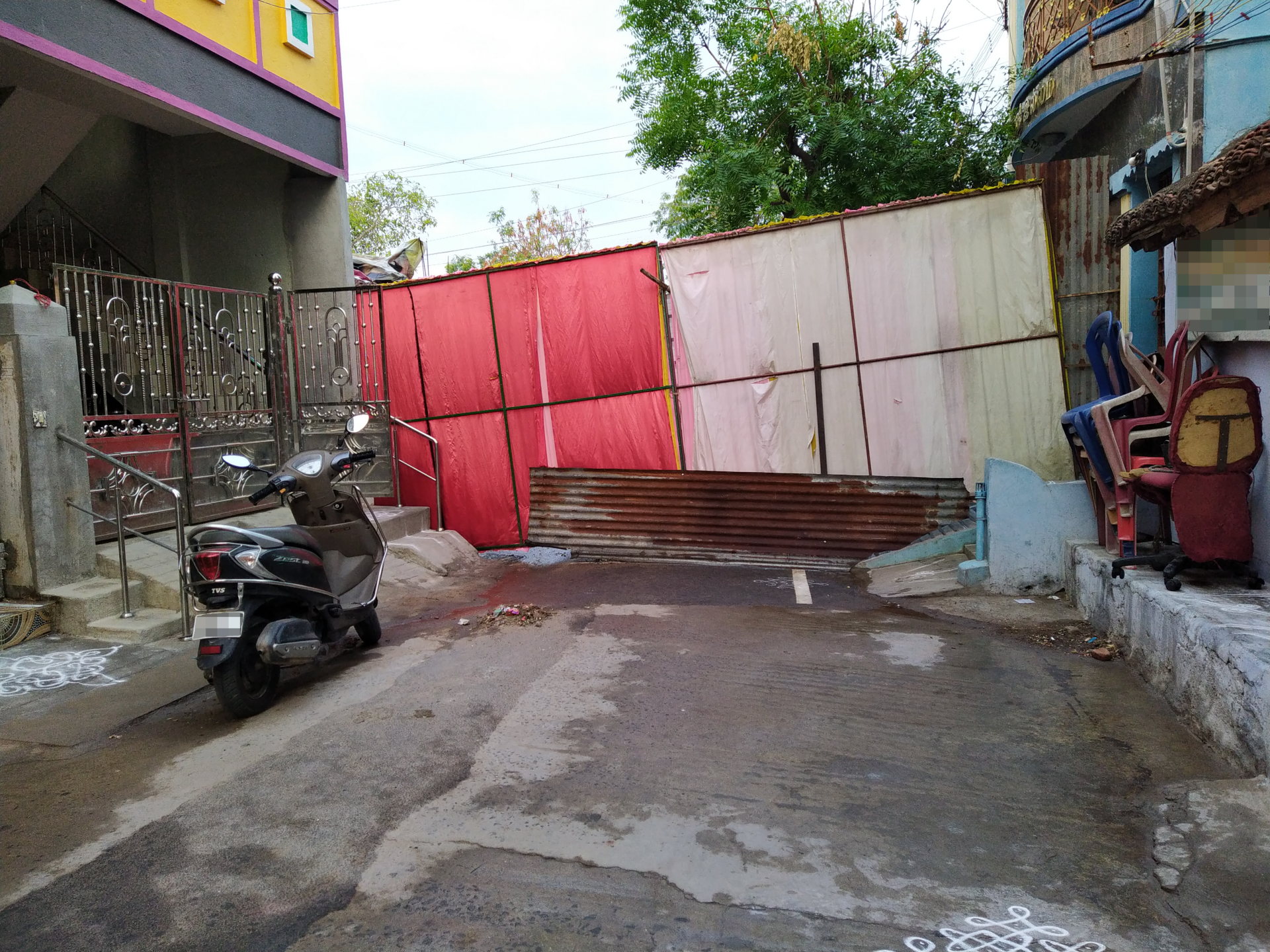
Same street from inside the containment.

If a street records more than five COVID-19 cases, it is designated as a containment zone and the entire street would be sealed. If a containment zone does not have positive cases for at least 14 days, it can be denotified. Previously, in April 2020, as per the government's initial containment plan, every infected persons' residence were demarcated as containment zones of 5 km^{2} radius in 16 districts. It was ringed by an additional 3 km^{2} buffer zone. People found infected were quarantined and the area where they lived is added into the containment plan. Houses inside the containment zones are and disinfected every day. Fever camps and door-to-door screening are also carried out in the identified hotspots. As of 9 June, Chennai has the most containment zones in the state with 369. It is followed by Tiruvannamalai and Cuddalore with 29 and 26 zones.

From 29 March, as part of its containment plan, the government had screened 3,96,147 people in their houses inside containment zones of 16 affected districts for fever and other symptoms. It was in process of screening up to 7 lakh persons.

Stickers announcing that "COVID-19/Do not Visit/Home under quarantine," were pasted on the doors of houses of foreign returnees to warn the public. Authorities had also marked their arms with home quarantine stamps. Government launched a mobile application to allow people under home quarantine to interact healthcare professionals for getting medical advice and counselling.

As of 31 March, 74,533 passengers who had returned from affected countries are being monitored under 28 day home quarantine. 3470 have completed this quarantine. 79 are currently in institutional quarantine facilities across the state.

On 11 April, the state deployed 12 'Special Task Teams' each comprising an IAS/IPS officers to coordinate with the respective district collectors to manage the pandemic-affected districts. The teams monitor contact tracing and ensures quick sampling, testing and release of results.

=== Social distancing measures ===
Tamil Nadu Government's Health and Family Welfare Dept had issued Standard Operating Procedures for social distancing for offices, workplaces, factories and establishments in April 2020. These SOPs provided measures regarding disinfecting, transport of people, gatherings, guidance on use of common spaces, lifts and others. Social distancing is being enforced as per contextual needs of various kinds of organisations. Tamil Nadu Government said that a total of 12,690 examination centres have been readied for the 10th class students to take their board exams. It also planned to distribute masks to about 46.37 lakh students of class 10 and higher secondary, besides teachers and other staff during the examination period. Per exam hall, only 10 students were to be allowed to take exams to ensure social distancing. State government resumed the operations of public buses from June 1 and to ensure social distancing, only 50% buses were being operated and the commuter capacity was capped to 60%. However the social distancing was hard to implement as people rushed onto the buses. The government also mentioned use of Paytm for contactless ticketing.

=== Medical supplies ===
The newly built Omandurar Government Multispeciality Hospital in Chennai was converted with 500 beds to exclusively treat COVID-19 patients. The government had also issued appointment order to recruit 530 doctors, 1,000 nurses and 1,508 lab technicians with immediate effect due to the situation. Orders for 200 new ambulances in the state have also been placed.

On 3 April, in order to ease the strain on the state's healthcare system, the government announced an incentive package of 30% capital investment with a cap of ₹20 crore (US$2.1 million) for new manufacturers of medical equipment such as ventilators, PPE kits, N-95 masks, multi para monitors and drugs such as hydroxychloroquine, azithromycin and vitamin C tablets. After the announcement, eight small and medium-scale companies approached the government to manufacture the required medical equipment. Tamil Nadu Medical Services Corporation said that it would purchase at least 50% of the equipment manufactured by these companies between May and June.

=== Legal action ===
As of 10 June 2020, 5,66,897 violations have been reported and 4,59,771 vehicles have been seized in the state for defying lockdown. According to state police, 6,11,064 violators were arrested for venturing out without a valid reason. A total fine of ₹11.39 crore has been collected.

== Impact ==
=== Economy ===
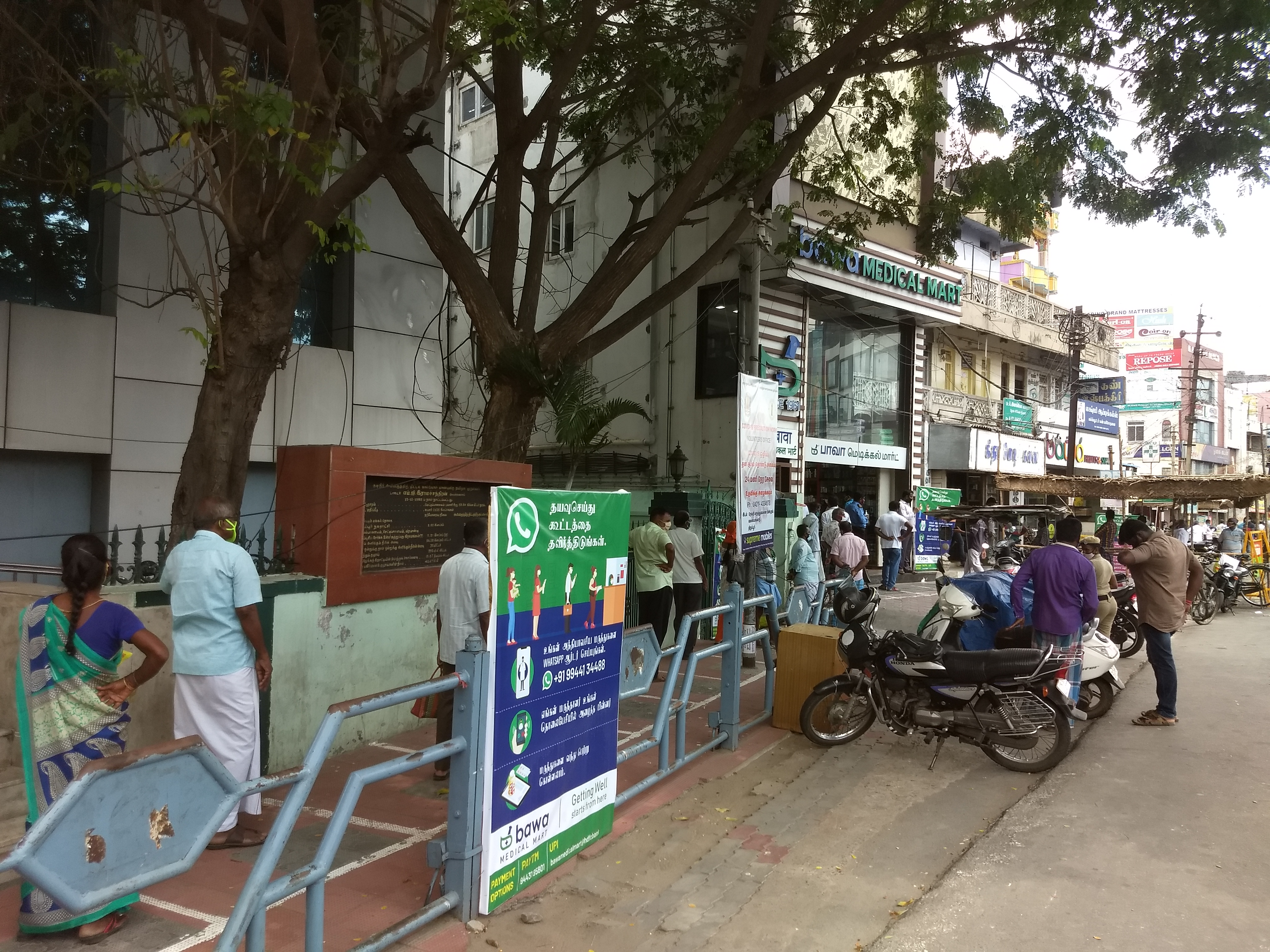
People queuing to buy medicines in Tiruppur

The Chief Minister shared a projection of the revenue losses that the state may face due to the pandemic. He said that the state may face a loss of about ₹85,000 crore and that a loss of about ₹35,000 crore has already been incurred. He said, "Revenue receipts have dried up over the past two months. With industries and businesses remaining shut, we would sustain a loss of about ₹12,000-13,000 crore a month as per the Finance Secretary's projections". Previously, he had cited and estimate of the Finance Department and pegged the revenue loss at ₹35,000 crore.

On 23 April, the state government exempted e-commerce companies of food processing units, export/import packing houses, research facilities agriculture and horticulture activities from lockdown restrictions. It also exempted bed-side attendants and caregivers of senior citizens.

Due to the financial crisis, the state government froze dearness allowance and earned leave encashment for its employees and pensioners until July 2021.

==== Agriculture ====
The nationwide lockdown has impacted farmers and floriculturists in the state. The Tamil Nadu Federation of All Farmers' Association said that about 15 lakh acres of summer paddy and 8 lakh acres of groundnuts across the state were affected due absence of labour for harvesting amid lockdown. Perishables such as fruits and vegetables cannot be taken to markets without transportation.

==== Food and grocery supply ====
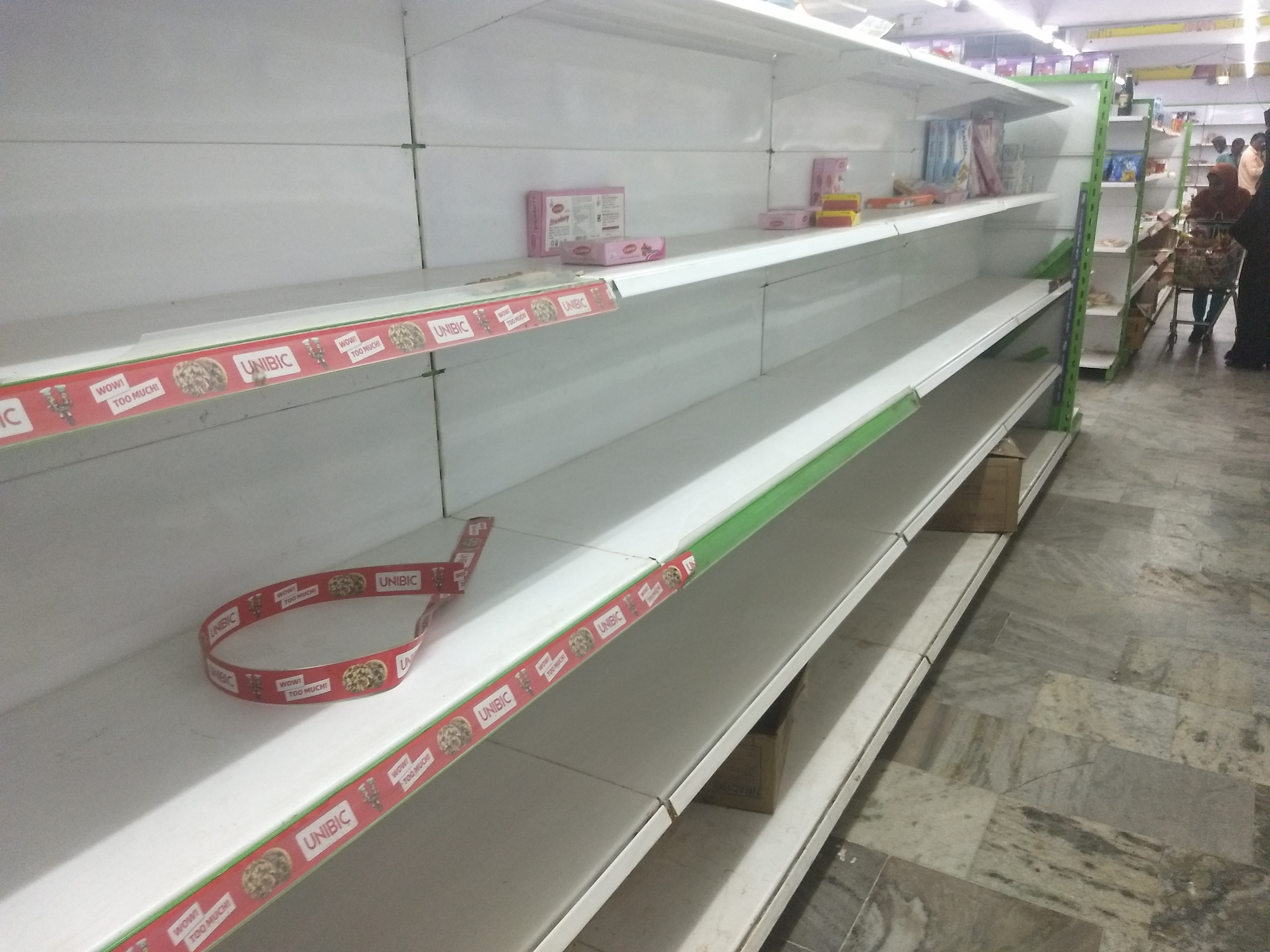
Empty store shelves in Tiruppur due to panic buying prior to lockdown

Shops dealing food takeaways, groceries, fruits and vegetables, dairy, meat and fish were allowed to function during the lockdown. Online food delivery services were briefly banned and allowed later by the government after imposing some regulations. The government has also issued identification cards for essential service providers that allow supply of goods and services without being stopped by the police. On 4 April, the operating hours of essential stores during lock-down was reduced to 6 am to 1 pm.

To avoid overcrowding and to in markets, the state has converted bus stations in towns and cities into vegetable markets. They were also installed with disinfectant tunnels. Later, the government ordered a ban on such tunnels since it was ineffective. In Chennai, the corporation and horticulture department has started door delivery service of vegetables. Amma canteens were also functional. They provided free food for sanitation workers during the lockdown period in Chennai.

=== Education ===
Primary schools were closed in the state as early as 15 March. On 21 March, the Class 10 SSLC board exams were postponed to beyond April 14, which were due to begin from March 27. Students of class 1–9 in the state will be promoted automatically considering the closure of schools. On 16 April, the Department of Higher Education postponed the summer semester exams for academic year 2019–20 to the beginning of next academic year for all colleges and universities in Tamil Nadu.

=== Social ===
Evidence, a Non Governmental Organization based on Madurai reported that violence against Scheduled Caste members increased during the period of lockdown and at least 25 instances of violence were recorded in 30 days from March 24. In one incident on April 22, 15 huts belonging to the Dalit community were destroyed.

On 10 April in Ariyalur, a 60-year-old man in the COVID-19 isolation ward of Ariyalur Government Hospital committed suicide while awaiting his test results. However his results returned negative. Reports of thefts from liquor shops, which were shut by the state government, have emerged.

On 20 April, an ambulance carrying the body of a doctor who had died due to COVID-19 was blocked and attacked by locals in Chennai, who protested against the burial at their locality fearing virus spread. The ambulance driver was injured and the body had to be cremated in a different cemetery. 20 were arrested.

=== Entertainment ===
==== Television industry ====
Indian channel Sun TV abruptly officially ended four of its running television soap operas such as Chocolate, Azhagu, Kalyana Parisu and Tamil Selvi owing to COVID-19 lockdown in India which also resulted in inter-district ban and due to artists refusing to shoot for the relevant television serials amid COVID-19 fears. Alongside Sun TV, other satellite television channels Star Vijay, Zee Tamil and Colors Tamil also started airing old television serials and movies from 23 March 2020. Tamil Nadu state government granted permission to start shooting for the television soap operas in the mid of May 2020 (21 May 2020) with allowing only a maximum of 20 cast artists in indoors and cautioned to maintain strict health guidelines during shooting procedures. As of 25 May 2020, shooting of television soap operas commenced but government in Tamil Nadu imposed another lockdown between 19 June to 30 June which resulted in yet another halting of television production. However, on 7 July 2020, most of the shooting of television soap operas resumed again to telecast all new episodes.

Sun TV Network revealed that it will telecast new episodes of their current television soap operas such as Kalyana Veedu, Nayagi, Roja and Kanmani with effect from 27 July 2020. Vijay TV also stated that its prime time television soap operas such as Pandian Stores, Bharathi Kannamma, Ayutha Ezhuthu, Kaatrin Mozhi, Thaenmozhi B.A and Baakiyalakshmi will be telecast with new episodes from 27 July 2020. Zee Tamil also confirmed that their prime time serials such as Sembaruthi, Rettai Roja, Yaaradi Nee Mohini, Oru Oorla Oru Rajakumari, Gokulathil Seethai, Rajamagal, Endrendrum Punnagai (TV series), Sathya and Neethane Enthan Ponvasantham will also be telecast with new episodes from 27 July 2020.

== Misinformation and discrimination ==
False information regarding the coronavirus started circulating in the social media platform WhatsApp which led to several arrests in the state. A 33-year-old quack was detained for deceiving the local people with a vaccine for COVID-19 in Ranipet. The government had warned of legal action against people spreading misinformation on COVID-19. Twitter removed actor Rajinikanth's video citing as misinformation after he claimed a 14-hour stay at home during the Janata Curfew can stop the disease going from "stage-2" to "stage-3". The police filed a case against the creator of a right wing YouTube channel Maridhas Answers for stoking communal sentiments against Muslims by blaming them of deliberately spreading the disease.

The chief minister Edappadi Palaniswami had asked people not to communalise the coronavirus infection. He also asked people to avoid discrimination saying, "people should avoid looking at the infected people and families with disgust". The state police filed cases against functionaries belonging to the Sangh Parivar outfits of Vishva Hindu Parishad and Hindu Munnani in various areas in the state for posting hate messages against a minority community by linking them with the spread of COVID-19 on Social Media.

== High profile deaths ==
High-profile deaths in Tamil Nadu due to COVID-19
Date	Name	Position
2 June 2020	J. Anbazhagan	Member of the Tamil Nadu Legislative Assembly
25 September 2020	S. P. Balasubrahmanyam	Indian playback singer
10 August 2020	H. Vasanthakumar	Member of parliament, Lok Sabha

== See also ==
- COVID-19 pandemic in India
- COVID-19 pandemic
- COVID-19 pandemic in Kerala
