= Beela Venkateshan =

Indian Administrative Service officer (1969–2025)

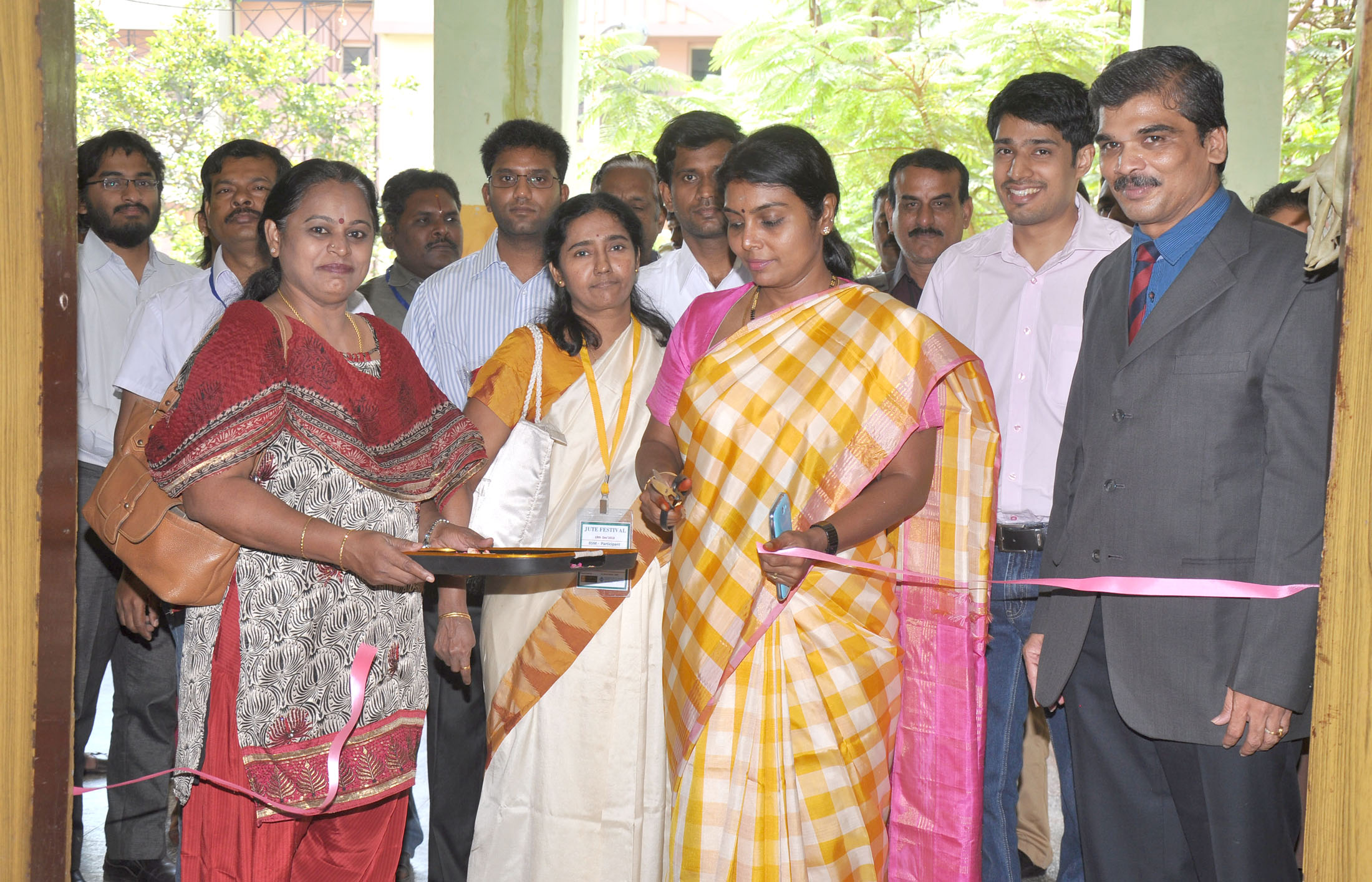
- Beela in the checkered saree

Secretary at the Commercial Taxes and Registration Department of State of Tamil Nadu
- In office 12 June 2020 – 24 September 2025

Health Secretary at the Department of Health and Family Welfare of State of Tamil Nadu
- In office 17 February 2019 – 12 June 2020
- Preceded by: J. Radhakrishnan
- Succeeded by: J. Radhakrishnan

Personal details
- Born: 15 November 1969 Thoothukudi, Tamil Nadu, India
- Died: 24 September 2025 (aged 55) Chennai, India
- Children: 2

Beela Venkatesan (15 November 1969 – 24 September 2025) was an Indian Administrative Service (IAS) officer serving as the Secretary of Commercial Taxes and Registration, known for her role in managing the COVID-19 pandemic in Tamil Nadu.

== Background ==
Beela Venkatesan was born in Thoothukudi District on 15 November 1969, and was later based in the Kottivakkam locality of Chennai. She was born in an influential family with her mother, Rani Venkatesan, being a senior Congress leader and a former MLA, and her father, L. N. Venkatesan, a retired Director general of police. Beela Venkatesan was an MBBS graduate from Madras Medical College and an IAS officer from the 1997 batch.

Her husband Rajesh Das IPS is accused of sexually harassing a woman Superintendent of Police in February. The incident allegedly happened when he and the woman officer were part of a security detail for the then Chief Minister Edappadi K. Palaniswami during an election campaign.

Venkatesan died from a brain tumour on 24 September 2025, at the age of 56.

== Career ==
In February 2019, Beela Venkatesan was appointed Health Secretary at the Department of Health and Family Welfare of State of Tamil Nadu. Prior to taking charge as the Health Secretary, she served as Commissioner, Indian Medicine and Homeopathy for the state. As a Health Secretary, Beela Venkatesan was instrumental in initiating Hospital Management Information System, under which patients data across Tamil Nadu would be digitised and stored in cloud for future reference and research purposes. She played vital role in minimising the number of Dengue cases reported in the state in 2019.
