= V. P. Kalairajan =

Indian politician

Member of the Tamil Nadu Legislative Assembly
- In office 11 May 2006 – 20 May 2016
- Preceded by: J. Anbazhagan
- Succeeded by: Sathyanarayan
- Constituency: Theagaraya Nagar

Personal details
- Born: 15 June 1961 (age 65) Orathanadu, Madras State, India
- Party: Tamilaga Vettri Kazhagam
- Other political affiliations: Dravida Munnetra Kazhagam (2019-2026); Amma Makkal Munnetra Kazhagam (2018-2019); All India Anna Dravida Munnetra Kazhagam (Until 2017)
- Children: 2

V. P. Kalairajan (born 15 June 1961) is an Indian politician and was a member of the 13th and 14th Tamil Nadu Legislative Assemblies from the Theagaraya Nagar constituency in Chennai district. He represented the All India Anna Dravida Munnetra Kazhagam (AIADMK) party. Now, he is a member of DMK.

Kalairajan won the Theagaraya Nagar constituency as an AIADMK candidate in the 2006 and 2011 state assembly elections.

The elections of 2016 resulted in Kalairajan's constituency being won by B. Sathyanarayanan of the AIADMK. He was one of thirteen AIADMK MLAs in the Greater Chennai area who were deselected by the party, apparently in an attempt to thwart a potential anti-incumbency backlash from the electorate following the recent flooding. It was felt that fresh faces would put some distance between the past and the present.

As of December 2016, Kalairajan was AIADMK district secretary for South Chennai (North) unit, a position from which he had been removed by Jayalalithaa, the then Chief Minister, in October 2015. Following the death of Jayalalitha in December 2016, he supported the move to have V. K. Sasikala installed as Chief Minister in place of O. Paneerselvam.

== Personal life ==
Kalairajan was born on 15 June 1961 in Orathanadu. He has MA and BL degrees, has worked as an advocate and is married with two children.
