= Ameerin Aadhi Bhagavan =

2013 Indian film by Ameer Sultan

- Theatrical release poster
- Directed by: Ameer
- Written by: Ameer
- Produced by: J. Anbazhagan
- Starring: Ravi Mohan; Neetu Chandra; Sudha Chandran; Saiju Kurup
- Cinematography: R. B. Gurudev; K. Devaraj
- Edited by: S. P. Ahmed; Ram Sudharsan
- Music by: Yuvan Shankar Raja
- Production company: Anbu Pictures
- Distributed by: Teamwork Production House
- Release date: 22 February 2013
- Running time: 157 minutes
- Country: India
- Language: Tamil

Ameerin Aadhi Bhagavan (transl. Ameer's Aadhi-Bhagavan) previously known as Aadhi Bhagavan, is a 2013 Indian Tamil-language action film written and directed by Ameer. Produced by DMK politician J. Anbazhagan, the film stars Ravi Mohan (credited as Jayam Ravi) in the titular dual role as the protagonist (Aadhi) and the antagonist (Bhagavan) along with Neetu Chandra, Saiju Kurup and Sudha Chandran. The film follows Aadhi, a Thailand-based gangster living separately from his mother and sister due to his criminal activities. His life changes when he rescues a young waitress from goons and soon finds himself drawn in a violent conspiracy hatched by Bhagavan, his Mumbai-based lookalike.

The cinematography was handled by R. B. Gurudev and K. Devaraj, while Ram Sudharsan and S. P. Ahmed both edited the film. The film features a background score from the 2011 Telugu-language film Panjaa composed by Yuvan Shankar Raja, who composed the music for both the films. It also features a Hindi-language song Agadam Bagadam sung by Mohit Chauhan. It is the second Asian film to make use of Auro 3D audio technology after Vishwaroopam. Following a formal announcement in February 2010, the film was in production for a period of three years and filmed primarily across Thailand, in the Indian states of Rajasthan and Goa, as well as the locales of Chennai, Mumbai, Toronto, Ontario and Canada.

The film had to undergo a title change following protests from Hindu religious groups. The film also faced censorship issues as the Central Board of Film Certification gave it an A (adults only) certificate in spite of 24 cuts. The film was released theatrically on 22 February 2013 and received mixed reviews from critics. The action sequences and Ravi's performance were praised, but the writing was criticized. In spite of its moderate box office success, Ameer announced a sequel. In 2014, Neetu Chandra won the award for Best Actor in a Negative Role (Tamil) at the 3rd South Indian International Movie Awards.

== Plot ==
Posing as a CBI official, Aadhi Shanmugham robs a Hyderabad politician with the help of his team and flees away from the country as the politician orders his men to hunt him down. Aadhi is a Bangkok-based gangster who is despised by his mother and sister due to his criminal activities. They reject all his offered help despite his attempts to mend their relations. Aadhi comes across a waitress named Karishma and one night sees her getting kidnapped. He fights off the kidnappers, pays them to free her the next day and allows her to stay with him. During a drug deal, Aadhi and the dealer get attacked. The ensuing shootout leaves Aadhi nearly dead, only to be rescued by Karishma, who treats him. Aadhi confesses his love for her, and they plan to depart for Mumbai. At the airport, Karishma is found talking to the man Aadhi paid to get her freed, and it is revealed they've been working together to trap Aadhi. In the meanwhile, it is revealed that Aadhi has a lookalike named Bhagavan, a gangster with slightly feminine behavior. Once Aadhi and Karishma land in Mumbai, she gives him a drink that puts him to sleep. He's taken to a place where his hair is shortened, mustache and beard are shaved. ACP Ranadev Patel, a corrupt officer, publicly announces the capture of Bhagavan. When a politician tries to kill Aadhi, mistaking him for Bhagavan, due to his brother's death, Ranadev stops him, and Aadhi is left alone with an inmate who reveals Karishma is actually Bhagavan's girlfriend, and her real name is Rani.

When told by the politician to deal with a Tamil Nadu MP, Bhagavan fought off rowdies who told him about the MP's location, following which he killed him and got invited to a party by the politician along with Rani. There, he found out that the politician's brother Sushil was attracted to Rani, and later even tried to force himself on her while drunk. The politician offered Bhagavan money to spare Sushil, but he set the money on fire and killed Sushil for his behavior. The politician enlisted police help to find Bhagavan, who had gone into hiding with Karishma. When Ranadev informed them about the same, Karishma received pictures of Aadhi, clicked by a partner and decided to trap Aadhi in order to get him framed for Bhagavan's crimes. Learning this, Aadhi is shocked and is taken away by the police before Rani personally meets and explains how she trapped him. Ranadev gets paid by the politicians: Sushil's brother and the Hyderabad politician, to kill Aadhi. Despite being wounded, Aadhi fights off the goons and escapes with his inmate. Believing Ranadev to have sold out Aadhi due to greed for money, Bhagavan kills him. Aadhi and his inmate meet a man who arranges a Malaysian passport for Aadhi to flee and also informs him Bhagavan and Rani are still in Mumbai. Aadhi decides to seek revenge and pursues Rani after learning of her location through a source. A shootout ensues, followed by a chase and resulting in a fight between Aadhi and Rani in which both are equally matched but Aadhi manages to get the upper hand and stabs Rani to death. Bhagavan enters and witnesses Aadhi murdering Rani and is heartbroken to see Rani's corpse. Aadhi challenges Bhagavan to a fight. An infuriated Bhagavan brutally beats up Aadhi. But after a lengthy battle Aadhi brutally stabs Bhagavan and tells him that 2 people in a world can't exist with the same face and leaves as a bloodied Bhagavan drags himself near Rani's corpse. After Aadhi leaves, Bhagavan is no longer near Rani's corpse implying that he escaped.

== Cast ==
- Ravi Mohan in dual role as:
  - Aadhi Shanmugam
  - Bhagavan Bhai
- Neetu Chandra as Rani Sampatha / Karishma (voiceover by Krithika Nelson)
- Sudha Chandran as Indra Sundaramurthy, Aadhi's mother
- Saiju Kurup as ACP Ranadev Patel IPS
- Babu Antony as Sam
- Karuna as Prabha Sundaramurthy, Aadhi's sister
- P. Ravi Shankar as photographer (henchman)
- Bagla as Bagla
- Mohan Raj as Kondal Rao
- Tarjan
- Shyamili Sukumar
- Sakshi Shivanand in an item number

== Production ==
=== Development ===
Ameer initially wanted to direct a project titled Kannabiran. He later decided to do a "quickie" with Ravi Mohan (known at the time as Jayam Ravi), with whom he had discussions for nearly two years, and shelved Kannabiran. In February 2010, Ameer officially announced the project at a press meet, titled Aadhi Bhagavan.

=== Casting ===
Early reports suggested that Mohan would enact the role of a gangster; later he was many-times reported to be playing double roles in the film.

During the official announcement, Ameer revealed that the lead actress had not yet been chosen. Mamta Mohandas to play the role of a modern NRI, with the latter even confirming in May 2010 to be part of the film, However, almost two months later, she reportedly opted out as she was unwilling to give almost a year of her dates. She was eventually replaced by Neetu Chandra, who was approached by Ameer, while working with him in Mysskin's Yuddham Sei. Being a black belt holder in taekwondo, Chandra performed her own stunts in the film. For a pivotal role as the lead character's mother, television actress Sudha Chandran was signed up in May 2010. Malayalam actor Saiju Kurup was roped in to essay the role of the main antagonist; he would portray a Mumbai-based Assistant Police Commissioner. Sakshi Shivanand was selected to perform an item number alongside 150 foreign dancers at specially erected set in April 2011.

=== Filming ===
The first schedule, primarily featuring Mohan, was held in May 2010 in Bangkok, Thailand. After the lead actress had been finalized, the film crew returned to Thailand in September that year for the subsequent schedule that took place at the beach resort Pattaya which was decorated as hero's office by art director Jacki, following which couple of scenes were canned in Mumbai and Chennai. Ameer started the third schedule in early February 2011 with shoots being held in Jaisalmer, Rajasthan and Bhuj, Gujarat. Mohan then moved on to finish his other ongoing project, Engeyum Kadhal for that he also sported a different look, as a result of which the filming of Aadhi Bhagavan came to a halt; it recommenced in December 2011. In April 2012, filming was carried out in Goa. Although filming was supposed to be completed with the Goa schedule, the crew moved to Rajasthan by early July 2012 to shoot a couple of climax action sequences in the deserts of Jaisalmer and Jaipur, which could not be shot during the previous schedule due to Neetu Chandra's absence, who had left to shoot for an international project. A fight sequence between both Mohan characters was shot in Bhojpur district during a 15-day schedule, seven cameras were said to have been used for the scene. Neetu Chandra finished shooting her portion on 25 July, while the entire filming was eventually completed on 31 July 2012, following its final schedule in Bikaner, Rajasthan.

Post-production works commenced by early 2012, while filming was still carried out, and the first look posters were published in July 2012. A press statement in June 2012 announced that Aadhi Bhagavan would become the first Tamil film to feature 7.1 surround sound at standard resolution. The film was recorded at composer A. R. Rahman's AM Studios, Chennai, India.

== Music ==
Aadhi Bhagavan

Soundtrack album by Yuvan Shankar Raja
- Released: 6 October 2012
- Recorded: 2010–2011
- Genre: Feature film soundtrack
- Length: 25:37
- Language: Tamil
- Label: Gemini Audio
- Producer: Yuvan Shankar Raja

Yuvan Shankar Raja chronology
Dhenikaina Ready (2012)	Aadhi Bhagavan (2012)	Aadhalal Kadhal Seiveer (2012)

As with Ameer's previous directorials, Yuvan Shankar Raja was assigned to score music for the film, as did lyricist Snehan who wrote three songs for the album. In July 2010, Ameer, Yuvan and Snehan left to Singapore for music compositions and finalised the tunes by August. One of the songs was reported to be a club number, featuring completely Hindi lyrics; Mohit Chauhan was recruited to lend his voice to this song. The song "Oru Thuli Vishamai" was recorded in late November 2010. Yuvan described it as "one of his toughest compositions", as while usually completing his songs within a couple of days, the track took him more than a week to finish after revising it more than 7–8 times.

Aadhi Bhagavan's soundtrack took more than a year to be composed and recorded due to Yuvan's commitments on Avan Ivan, Mankatha and Panjaa (all 2011). In late July 2012, the composer was working on the final sound mixing with Kausikan Sivalingam handling the mixing in Berlin, Germany. He also worked with several German instrumentalists and sound engineers for the album. Tamil Canadian rapper Rajeev ThaProphecy collaborated with Yuvan and performed a rap number titled "Bhagavan Rap Song". A promotional music video featuring ThaProphecy and Ameer, was shot in Canada, and edited with stills from the film, released in January 2013.

Yuvan reused the background score from the Telugu film Panjaa (2011), which was also composed by himself. The score was recorded at A. R. Rahman's AM Studios, in Chennai with 7.1 surround sound and Auro 3D technology.

The producers intended to host an event in Canada on 29 September 2012 to launch the film's music, which would mark the first ever Tamil audio launch event held in North America. The event was however held on 6 October 2012 at the Powerade Centre in Brampton, Ontario. It saw the presence of several noted film personalities, along with the film's cast and crew. Besides the live performance of the film's soundtrack as well as popular songs from the director and composer's previous collaborations, the event saw a dance performance by South African dancers.

Track listing
No.	Title	Lyrics	Singer(s)	Length
1.	"Eisalaamey Eisalaam"	Snehan	Manasi Scott, Rahul Nambiar	4:58
2.	"Kaatriley Nadanthene"	Arivumathi	Udit Narayan, Shweta Pandit	4:55
3.	"Yaavum Poithaanaa"	Snehan	Madhushree	4:20
4.	"Oru Thuli Vishamai"	Snehan	Sharib Sabri, Shreya Ghoshal	5:36
5.	"Agadam Bagadam"	Manoj	Mohit Chauhan	4:22
6.	"Bhagavan Rap Song"	Rajeev ThaProphecy	Rajeev ThaProphecy, Sathyan	3:43

== Release ==
=== Theatrical ===
Aadhi Bhagavan was filmed around a span of two years. It was speculated that the film was scheduled to release on the eve of Pongal festival, which falls on 10 January 2013. Later, the film was scheduled to be released on 24 January 2013, to avoid clashing with another delayed film Samar. then postponed to avoid clashing with the Kamal Haasan-starrer Vishwaroopam (2013), which was scheduled on the same date. Moreover, the sudden postponement and the uncertainty prevailing over the release of Vishwaroopam, affected the film's release by pushing towards the end of February. It was also speculated that the film would be scheduled for a Valentine's Day release, on 14 February 2013. But, the makers confirmed that the film will be released on 22 February 2013.

The film was awarded an A certificate by the censor board, citing the action sequences and violence, with 24 cuts. Ameer criticised the censor board officials, regarding that the film was given A certificate, unnecessarily. A member from the censor board registered a complaint against Ameer, to the city police commissioner citing that, the officials had asked him for a bribe amount to receive a U/A or U certificate to the film. The officials claimed that post the release of Vishwaroopam, the censor board tightened the rules and the film was given an A certificate for the mafia storyline.

The film faced criticisms from Hindu groups, as the film, as well as its former title, Aadhi Bhagavan, was mentioned as offensive to their religion. Later Vishwa Hindu Parishad (VHP), filed a petition against the film, seeking a ban on it, as the title was meant objectionable to the group, and they also demanded a statewide protest. Before its release, the censor board officials requested to change its title, by adding a prefix Ameerin, which was named as Ameerin Aadhi-Bhagavan.

Reservations for the film were started three days before the release, on 19 February 2013. The film was released in 1200 screens worldwide clashing with Haridas (2013).

=== Marketing ===
As a part of the film's promotions, director Ameer launched an official website and official Facebook page for the film. The trailer of the film was released at a grand launch event held in Chennai on 8 November 2012, with the presence of the film's cast and crew. The making video of the film's shooting in Thailand was released in December 2012. A new trailer was launched on 17 January 2013.

=== Home media ===
The satellite rights of the film were sold to Sun TV. A censored version of the film was released digitally on Sun NXT.

== Critical response ==
Writing for Rediff.com, S. Saraswathi praised the performances and action sequences but felt the film might not appeal to everyone due to the heavy amount of violence and "every second scene being a fight scene". Writing for The Hindu, Malathi Rangarajan praised Ravi's performance and Chandra's martial arts skills showcased in the action scenes, but found the characters and situations predictable. She also criticized the placement of voice-overs translating the Hindi dialogues into Tamil, as they gave the feel of a dubbed film.
