= S. A. Ganesan =

Indian politician (1930–2018)

Sa. Ganesan (21 September 1930 – 13 April 2018) was an Indian politician of the Dravida Munnetra Kazhagam who served as mayor of Madras during 1970–71. He was elected to the Tamil Nadu Legislative Assembly from Thiyagarayanagar constituency contesting as a DMK contestant in 1989.
