= Oupalam Assembly constituency =

Constituency of the Puducherry legislative assembly in India

Coordinates: 11.921°N 79.825°E

Oupalam
- Constituency No. 15 for the Puducherry Legislative Assembly
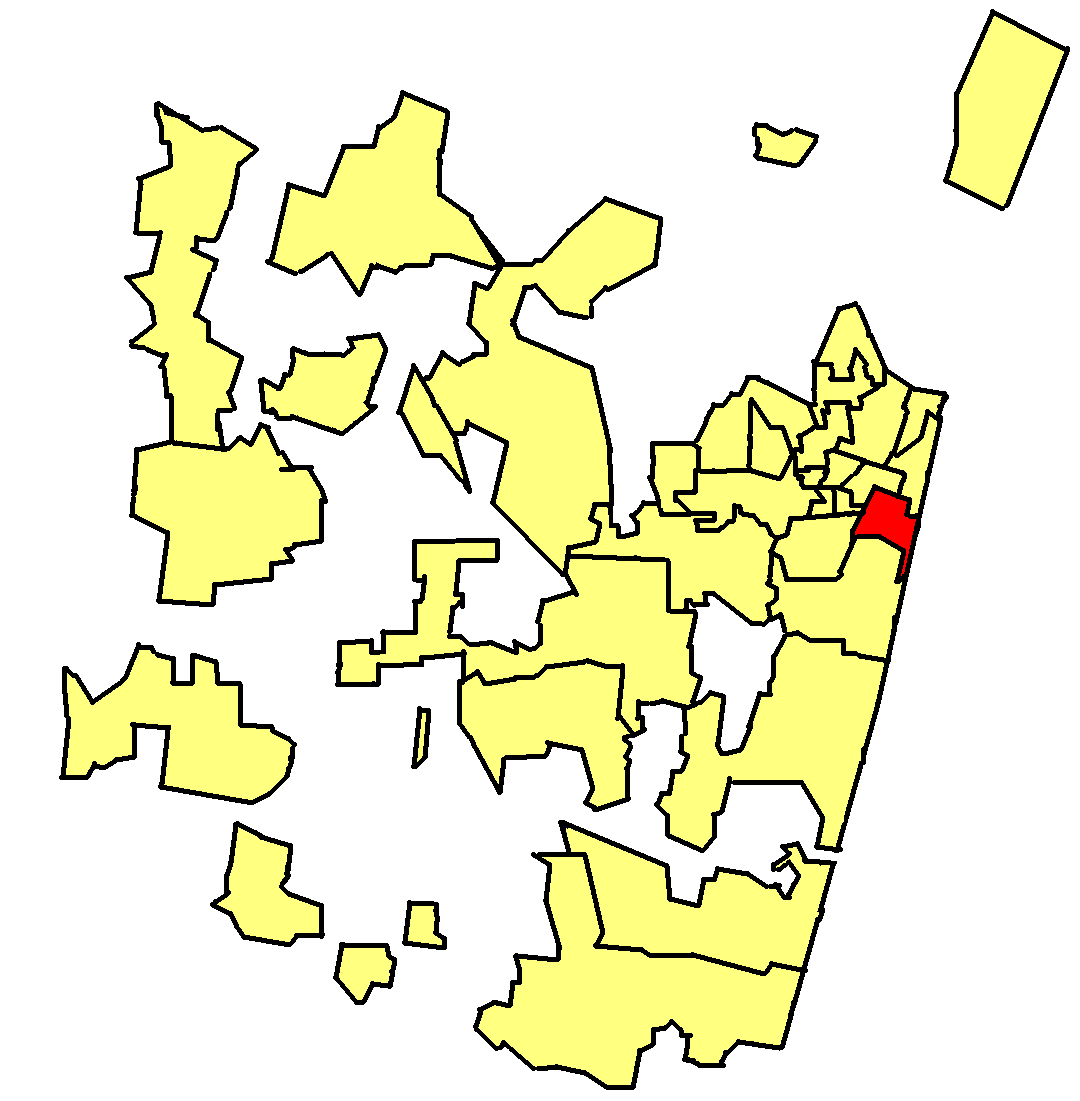

Constituency details
- Country: India
- Region: South India
- Union Territory: Puducherry
- District: Puducherry
- Lok Sabha constituency: Puducherry
- Established: 1964
- Total electors: 27,913
- Reservation: None

Member of Legislative Assembly
- 16th Puducherry Legislative Assembly
- Incumbent A. Anbalagan
- Party: AIADMK
- Alliance: NDA
- Elected year: 2026

Oupalam is a legislative assembly constituency in the Union territory of Puducherry in India. Oupalam Assembly constituency was part of Puducherry Lok Sabha constituency.

== Members of the Legislative Assembly ==
Year	Member	Party
1964	G. Perumal Raja	Independent politician
1969	S. Govindarajalu	Dravida Munnetra Kazhagam
1974	C. N. Parthasarathy	All India Anna Dravida Munnetra Kazhagam
1977	C. N. Parthasarathy	All India Anna Dravida Munnetra Kazhagam
1980	Sitha Vedanayagam	Dravida Munnetra Kazhagam
1985	P. K. Loganathan	All India Anna Dravida Munnetra Kazhagam
1990	N. Naghamuthu	Dravida Munnetra Kazhagam
1991	U. C. Arumugan	All India Anna Dravida Munnetra Kazhagam
1996	S. Rathinam @ Manohar	Tamil Maanila Congress
2001	A. Anbalagan	All India Anna Dravida Munnetra Kazhagam
2006	A. Anbalagan	All India Anna Dravida Munnetra Kazhagam
2011	A. Anbalagan	All India Anna Dravida Munnetra Kazhagam
2016	A. Anbalagan	All India Anna Dravida Munnetra Kazhagam
2021	Annibal Kennedy	Dravida Munnetra Kazhagam
2026	A. Anbalagan	All India Anna Dravida Munnetra Kazhagam

== Election results ==
Vote share of winning candidates
2026	39.51%
2021	56.64%
2016	39.95%
2011	42.59%
2006	58.05%
2001	59.24%
1996	50.79%
1991	57.27%
1990	53.96%
1985	38.99%
1980	70.06%
1977	36.69%
1974	46.84%
1969	46.59%
1964	55.47%

=== 2026 ===
2026 Puducherry Legislative Assembly election: Oupalam
Party	Candidate	Votes	%	±%
AIADMK	A. Anbalagan	9,099	39.51	
TVK	S. Siva	8,073	35.05	
DMK	Annibal Kennedy	5,327	23.13	
NOTA	None of the above	151	0.66	
TMTHK (Note: Tamilaga Makkal Thannurimai Katchi)	Subramaniyan	28	0.12	
PMK	Selvanathan	26	0.11	
Majority		1,026	4.46	
Turnout		23,030	90.26	
AIADMK gain from DMK		Swing		

=== Assembly Election 2021 ===
2021 Puducherry Legislative Assembly election: Oupalam
Party	Candidate	Votes	%	±%
DMK	Annibal Kennedy	13,433	56.64	20.54
AIADMK	A. Anbalagan	8,653	36.48	−3.47
MNM	Santhosh Kumar	629	2.65	
NOTA	Nota	219	0.92	−0.77
Margin of victory		4,780	20.15	16.30
Turnout		23,717	85.06	−2.53
Registered electors		27,882		3.67
DMK gain from AIADMK		Swing	16.69	

=== Assembly Election 2016 ===
2016 Puducherry Legislative Assembly election: Oupalam
Party	Candidate	Votes	%	±%
AIADMK	A. Anbalagan	9,411	39.95	−2.64
DMK	Annibal Kennedy	8,503	36.10	8.75
AINRC	Bussy N. Anand	4,725	20.06	
NOTA	None of the Above	398	1.69	
BJP	Sivaraj	113	0.48	
Margin of victory		908	3.85	−10.46
Turnout		23,557	87.59	0.27
Registered electors		26,895		4.90
AIADMK hold		Swing	-2.64	

=== Assembly Election 2011 ===
2011 Puducherry Legislative Assembly election: Oupalam
Party	Candidate	Votes	%	±%
AIADMK	A. Anbalagan	9,536	42.59	−15.45
Independent	N. Anand	6,332	28.28	
DMK	Annibal Kennedy	6,122	27.35	−11.34
Independent	Moulana Abdul Khadir	159	0.71	
Independent	R. Anand	112	0.50	
Margin of victory		3,204	14.31	−5.05
Turnout		22,388	87.32	−1.76
Registered electors		25,639		44.11
AIADMK hold		Swing	-15.45	

=== Assembly Election 2006 ===
2006 Pondicherry Legislative Assembly election: Oupalam
Party	Candidate	Votes	%	±%
AIADMK	A. Anbalagan	9,200	58.05	−1.19
DMK	U. C. Arumugam	6,131	38.68	
DMDK	S. Elangovan	234	1.48	
Independent	C. Arumugam	124	0.78	
Margin of victory		3,069	19.36	−4.37
Turnout		15,849	89.08	16.20
Registered electors		17,791		−8.76
AIADMK hold		Swing	-1.19	

=== Assembly Election 2001 ===
2001 Pondicherry Legislative Assembly election: Oupalam
Party	Candidate	Votes	%	±%
AIADMK	A. Anbalagan	8,416	59.24	15.85
Pondicherry Makkal Congress	P. Pandian	5,044	35.50	
TMC(M)	N. Naghamuthu	655	4.61	
LJP	C. Angappin Alias Rousseau Angappin	92	0.65	
Margin of victory		3,372	23.73	16.34
Turnout		14,207	72.89	7.73
Registered electors		19,499		1.08
AIADMK gain from TMC(M)		Swing	1.97	

=== Assembly Election 1996 ===
1996 Pondicherry Legislative Assembly election: Oupalam
Party	Candidate	Votes	%	±%
TMC(M)	S. Rathinam @ Manohar	6,866	50.79	
AIADMK	U. C. Arumugam	5,866	43.39	−13.88
MGRK	P. K. Loganathan	226	1.67	
Independent	V. M. Murugan	158	1.17	
MDMK	A. Gabrial	141	1.04	
BSP	T. Kalaimaran	102	0.75	
Margin of victory		1,000	7.40	−8.72
Turnout		13,519	72.39	7.23
Registered electors		19,290		−3.98
TMC(M) gain from AIADMK		Swing	-6.48	

=== Assembly Election 1991 ===
1991 Pondicherry Legislative Assembly election: Oupalam
Party	Candidate	Votes	%	±%
AIADMK	U. C. Arumugan	7,352	57.27	13.71
DMK	N. Nathamuthu	5,283	41.15	−12.81
PMK	Gopi Alias Gopalakrishnan	73	0.57	−0.56
Margin of victory		2,069	16.12	5.72
Turnout		12,838	65.16	−4.01
Registered electors		20,090		0.86
AIADMK gain from DMK		Swing	3.31	

=== Assembly Election 1990 ===
1990 Pondicherry Legislative Assembly election: Oupalam
Party	Candidate	Votes	%	±%
DMK	N. Naghamuthu	7,378	53.96	23.55
AIADMK	P. K. Loganathan	5,956	43.56	4.57
PMK	S. James	154	1.13	
Margin of victory		1,422	10.40	1.82
Turnout		13,674	69.17	−6.34
Registered electors		19,918		48.61
DMK gain from AIADMK		Swing	14.96	

=== Assembly Election 1985 ===
1985 Pondicherry Legislative Assembly election: Oupalam
Party	Candidate	Votes	%	±%
AIADMK	P. K. Loganathan	3,898	38.99	10.85
DMK	Sitha Vedanayagam	3,040	30.41	−39.65
Independent	N. Nagamuthu	2,035	20.36	
JP	R. Krishnasamy	1,008	10.08	
Margin of victory		858	8.58	−33.33
Turnout		9,997	75.51	−1.88
Registered electors		13,403		29.94
AIADMK gain from DMK		Swing	-31.07	

=== Assembly Election 1980 ===
1980 Pondicherry Legislative Assembly election: Oupalam
Party	Candidate	Votes	%	±%
DMK	Sitha Vedanayagam	5,419	70.06	52.87
AIADMK	C. N. Parthasarathy	2,177	28.14	−8.54
Independent	Gadjendirin Baskara	52	0.67	
Independent	S. Rajaram	48	0.62	
Independent	R. Krishnan	39	0.50	
Margin of victory		3,242	41.91	38.36
Turnout		7,735	77.39	6.81
Registered electors		10,315		3.46
DMK gain from AIADMK		Swing	33.37	

=== Assembly Election 1977 ===
1977 Pondicherry Legislative Assembly election: Oupalam
Party	Candidate	Votes	%	±%
AIADMK	C. N. Parthasarathy	2,551	36.69	−10.15
JP	D. Munisamy	2,304	33.14	
DMK	Sitha Vedanayagam	1,195	17.19	−1.59
CPI	M. Manjini	864	12.43	
Independent	G. Kothanlapani Baskara Alias G. K. Baskaran	39	0.56	
Margin of victory		247	3.55	−12.35
Turnout		6,953	70.58	−11.90
Registered electors		9,970		16.80
AIADMK hold		Swing	-10.15	

=== Assembly Election 1974 ===
1974 Pondicherry Legislative Assembly election: Oupalam
Party	Candidate	Votes	%	±%
AIADMK	C. N. Parthasarathy	3,198	46.84	
INC(O)	P. Raghava Chettiar	2,112	30.93	
DMK	S. Govindarajulu	1,282	18.78	−27.81
INC	T. Bakhtavachalam	236	3.46	−19.84
Margin of victory		1,086	15.91	−0.56
Turnout		6,828	82.49	7.49
Registered electors		8,536		9.67
AIADMK gain from DMK		Swing	0.25	

=== Assembly Election 1969 ===
1969 Pondicherry Legislative Assembly election: Oupalam
Party	Candidate	Votes	%	±%
DMK	S. Govindarajalu	2,676	46.59	
Independent	K. Karunakaran	1,730	30.12	
INC	N. Rangarajah	1,338	23.29	−21.24
Margin of victory		946	16.47	5.53
Turnout		5,744	75.00	4.22
Registered electors		7,783		−3.47
DMK gain from Independent		Swing	-8.88	

=== Assembly Election 1964 ===
1964 Pondicherry Legislative Assembly election: Oupalam
Party	Candidate	Votes	%	±%
Independent	G. Perumal Raja	3,098	55.47	
INC	D. Munisamy	2,487	44.53	
Margin of victory		611	10.94	
Turnout		5,585	70.78	
Registered electors		8,063		
Independent win (new seat)				

== See also ==
- List of constituencies of the Puducherry Legislative Assembly
- Puducherry district
