= A. Anbalagan =

Indian politician

Member of the Puducherry Legislative Assembly
- Incumbent
- Assumed office 4 May 2026
- Preceded by: Annibal Kennedy
- Constituency: Oupalam
- In office 13 May 2001 – 2 May 2021
- Preceded by: S. Rathinam
- Succeeded by: Annibal Kennedy
- Constituency: Oupalam

Pro tem Speaker of the Puducherry Legislative Assembly
- Incumbent
- Assumed office May 2026

Personal details
- Party: All India Anna Dravida Munnetra Kazhagam
- Parent: Arumugam (father)

Arumugam Anbalagan better known as A. Anbalagan is an Indian politician from Puducherry who currently serves as the pro term speaker in the Puduchery Legislative Assembly. He is the only ruling side (NDA) MLA of AIADMK in India. He is a member of the Puducherry Legislative Assembly from Oupalam Assembly constituency in Puducherry district. He was served as an MLA for four consecutive terms since 2001. In 2021 election he lost to DMK candidate Annibal Kennedy. He won in the 2026 election representing AIADMK.

== Electoral History ==
Year	Constituency	Party	Votes	%	Opponent	Party	Votes	%	Result	Margin	%
2026	Oupalam	AIADMK	9,099	39.51	S. Siva	TVK	8,073	35.05	Won	▲1,026	▲4.46
2021	Oupalam	AIADMK	8,653	36.48	Annibal Kennedy	DMK	13,433	56.64	Lost	▼4,780	▼20.16
2016	Oupalam	AIADMK	9,411	39.97	Annibal Kennedy	DMK	8,503	36.11	Won	▲908	▲3.86
2011	Oupalam	AIADMK	9,536	42.59	N. Anand	IND	6,332	28.28	Won	▲3,204	▲14.31
2006	Oupalam	AIADMK	9,200	58.07	U.C. Arumugam	DMK	6,131	38.70	Won	▲3,069	▲19.37
2001	Oupalam	AIADMK	8,416	59.24	P. Pandian	PMC	5,044	35.50	Won	▲3,372	▲23.74
