= K. Sourirajan =

Indian politician

K. Sourirajan is an Indian politician and former Member of the Legislative Assembly of Tamil Nadu. He was elected to the Tamil Nadu legislative assembly from Theagaraya Nagar constituency as a Gandhi Kamaraj Congress Party candidate in 1980 election, and as an Indian National Congress candidate in 1984 election.
