= J. Radhakrishnan =

Indian civil servant and administrator (born 1966)

Jagannathan Radhakrishnan

Commissioner of Greater Chennai Corporation
- In office 2023–2024
- Preceded by: Gagandeep Singh Bedi
- Succeeded by: J. Kumaragurubaran

Personal details
- Born: September 16, 1966 (age 60) Madras, India
- Education: Veterinary College, Hebbal
- Occupation: Civil servant

Jagannathan Radhakrishnan (born 16 September 1966) is an Indian civil servant and administrator who served as Commissioner of Greater Chennai Corporation from 2023 to 2025. He is known for his work as District Collector of Nagapattinam and Thanjavur districts during the 2004 Indian Ocean earthquake and tsunami and as Health Secretary of Tamil Nadu during the Covid-19 pandemic in India which have been widely appreciated.

== Early life and education ==
Radhakrishnan was born on 16 September 1966 in Madras, India. He had his schooling in Kanpur, Chandigarh, Nashik and Deolali and graduated in Veterinary Science in First Class from Bangalore. Radhakrishnan did his post-graduation in Veterinary Science (Animal Breeding and Genetics).

== Early career ==
Radhakrishnan successfully completed his Civil service examinations and qualified for the Indian Administrative Service in 1992. After his initial training was over, Radhakrishnan was appointed Sub-Collector of Tuticorin on 9 August 1994. He served as Tamil Nadu's Deputy Secretary of Finance from 1996 to 1999 and Family Health and Welfare from March 1999 to March 2000 and as Commissioner of Land Revenue and District Administration of Chennai district from March 2000 to July 2001 before being appointed as Collector of Salem district in July 2001.

Radhakrishnan served as District Collector of Salem from 1 July 2001 to 15 July 2003 where he successfully carries out battle against social evil Female infanticide and Thanjavur from 29 May 2004 to 10 January 2005. Radhakrishnan was the Collector of Thanjavur district when the Indian Ocean tsunami struck the Tamil Nadu coast on 26 December 2004 and organized the relief operations in the district. His efficiency in handling the situation and his disaster recovery and relief measures gained considerable appreciation. On 10 January 2005, Radhakrishnan was transferred from Thanjavur to the worse-hit Nagapattinam district to make up for the laxity in relief operations in the district. Radhakrishnan served as District Collector of Nagapattinam from 10 January 2005 to 16 May 2006 and oversaw the creation of a number of relief camps.

== Recognition ==
Radhakrishnan gained international media attention for the first time during the aftermath of the 2004 tsunami when his relief measures helped organize a speedy recovery in Thanjavur district. His administrative skills were lauded by former American President, Bill Clinton when he visited Nagapattinam district as the United Nations Secretary General's Special Envoy for Tsunami Recovery on May 27, 2005. Following Clinton's visit, Radhakrishnan was invited by United States Department of Education to lecture on tsunami-related issues in Washington D. C, Seattle, San Francisco and Hawaii. Radhakrishan was also invited by the Government of Sri Lanka to share his expertise with Sri Lankan relief workers and officials. From March 2009 to March 2012 Radhakrishnan headed the Disaster Management team of the United Nations Development Programme in his homeland India and has since returned to Tamil Nadu and was posted as Secretary Special Programmes and Initiatives in March 2012 and later from September 2012 to February 2019 he served as the Principal Secretary to the Government, Health and Family Welfare Department in Tamil Nadu. During his long tenure as health secretary TN health department reached important milestones in maternal morality rate and organ donation. He did commendable task in preventing outbreak of epidemics after chennai flood, and controlling the rise of dengue cases. On February 18, 2019, he took over as principal secretary of the Transport Department in Government of Tamil Nadu.

In April 2021 he rejoined Tamil Nadu Government as the Secretary of the Special Programme Implementation department. In late September he was posted as Secretary to the Government Health and Family welfare department in Tamil Nadu.
