= Thiyagarayanagar Assembly constituency =

State Legislative Assembly constituency in Tamil Nadu, India

Coordinates: 8.72°N 77.75°E

Thiyagarayanagar
- Constituency No. 24 for the Tamil Nadu Legislative Assembly

Constituency details
- Country: India
- Region: South India
- State: Tamil Nadu
- District: Chennai
- Lok Sabha constituency: Chennai South
- Established: 1957
- Total electors: 1,58,791
- Reservation: None

Member of Legislative Assembly
- 17th Tamil Nadu Legislative Assembly
- Incumbent N. Anand
- Party: TVK
- Elected year: 2026

Thiyagarayanagar is the legislative assembly constituency located in the southern part of Chennai district of the Indian state of Tamil Nadu. Its State Assembly Constituency number is 24. It is a part of Chennai South Lok Sabha constituency during national elections. Thiyagarayanagar has been in existence since the 1957 election. It currently covers T. Nagar and adjacent localities, such as Pondy Bazaar, Kodambakkam, Ashok Nagar, K. K. Nagar, MGR Nagar, Vadapalani and West Mambalam. It is one of the 234 State Legislative Assembly Constituencies in Tamil Nadu.

== Members of Legislative Assembly ==
=== Madras State ===
Year	Winner	Party
1957	K. Vinayakam	Indian National Congress
1962	Kanchi Manimozhiyar	Dravida Munnetra Kazhagam
1967	M. P. Sivagnanam	Dravida Munnetra Kazhagam

=== Tamil Nadu ===
Assembly	Year	Winner	Party
Fifth	1971	K. M. Subramaniam	Indian National Congress (O)
Sixth	1977	R. E. Chandran Jayapal	Dravida Munnetra Kazhagam
Seventh	1980	K. Sourirajan	Indian National Congress
Eighth	1984	K. Sourirajan	Indian National Congress
Ninth	1989	S. A. Ganesan	Dravida Munnetra Kazhagam
Tenth	1991	S. Jayakumar	All India Anna Dravida Munnetra Kazhagam
Eleventh	1996	A. Chellakumar	Tamil Maanila Congress (Moopanar)
Twelfth	2001	J. Anbazhagan	Dravida Munnetra Kazhagam
Thirteenth	2006	V. P. Kalairajan	All India Anna Dravida Munnetra Kazhagam
Fourteenth	2011	V. P. Kalairajan	All India Anna Dravida Munnetra Kazhagam
Fifteenth	2016	B. Sathyanarayanan	All India Anna Dravida Munnetra Kazhagam
Sixteenth	2021	J. Karunanithi	Dravida Munnetra Kazhagam
Seventeenth	2026	N. Anand	Tamilaga Vettri Kazhagam

== Election results ==
Vote share of winning candidates
2026	38.55%
2021	41.05%
2016	37.47%
2011	58.48%
2006	48.57%
2001	48.55%
1996	67.16%
1991	61.19%
1989	43.03%
1984	49.26%
1980	50.58%
1977	30.91%
1971	48.32%
1967	57.36%
1962	41.02%
1957	45.10%

=== 2026 ===
2026 Tamil Nadu Legislative Assembly election: T. Nagar
Party	Candidate	Votes	%	±%
TVK	N. Anand	51,632	38.55	New
AIADMK	B. Sathyanarayanan	38,605	28.83	▼12.12
DMK	Raja Anbazhagan	37,017	27.64	▼13.41
NTK	V. Anusha	4,554	3.40	▼2.67
NOTA	NOTA	878	0.66	▼0.52
Margin of victory		13,027	9.72	▲9.62
Turnout		1,33,928	84.34	▲28.63
Registered electors		1,58,791		▼86,214
TVK gain from DMK		Swing	▲38.55	

=== 2021 ===
2021 Tamil Nadu Legislative Assembly election: Thiyagarayanagar
Party	Candidate	Votes	%	±%
DMK	J. Karunanithi	56,035	41.05	+5.8
AIADMK	B. Sathyanarayanan	55,898	40.95	+3.48
MNM	Pala. Karuppiah	14,567	10.67	New
NTK	S. Sivasankari	8,284	6.07	+4.61
NOTA	NOTA	1,617	1.18	−1.33
AMMK	R. Bharaneeswaran	782	0.57	New
Margin of victory		137	0.10	−2.12
Turnout		136,497	55.71	−2.22
Rejected ballots		84	0.06	
Registered electors		245,005		
DMK gain from AIADMK		Swing	3.58	

=== 2016 ===
2016 Tamil Nadu Legislative Assembly election: Thiyagarayanagar
Party	Candidate	Votes	%	±%
AIADMK	B. Sathyanarayanan	53,207	37.47	−21.01
DMK	Kanimozhi N. V. N. Somu	50,052	35.25	New
BJP	H. Raja	19,888	14.01	+10.48
DMDK	V. Kumar	6,210	4.37	New
PMK	V. Vinoth	5,071	3.57	New
NOTA	NOTA	3,570	2.51	New
NTK	Padmanapan	2,072	1.46	New
Margin of victory		3,155	2.22	−22.80
Turnout		141,982	57.93	−8.64
Registered electors		245,101		
AIADMK hold		Swing	-21.01	

=== 2011 ===
2011 Tamil Nadu Legislative Assembly election: Thiyagarayanagar
Party	Candidate	Votes	%	±%
AIADMK	V. P. Kalairajan	75,883	58.48	+9.92
INC	A. Chellakumar	43,421	33.46	New
BJP	K. Ravichandran	4,575	3.53	+0.75
Independent	Traffic Ramaswamy	1,305	1.01	New
IJK	G. Sarada	958	0.74	New
Independent	E. Sarathbabu	830	0.64	New
Margin of victory		32,462	25.02	14.22
Turnout		129,751	66.57	3.69
Registered electors		194,922		
AIADMK hold		Swing	9.92	

=== 2006 ===
2006 Tamil Nadu Legislative Assembly election: Thiyagarayanagar
Party	Candidate	Votes	%	±%
AIADMK	V. P. Kalairajan	74,131	48.57	+2.12
DMK	J. Anbazhagan	57,654	37.77	−10.77
DMDK	T. Pandian	8,824	5.78	New
LKPT	S. Arvind	6,323	4.14	New
BJP	Muktha V. Srinivasan	4,235	2.77	New
Margin of victory		16,477	10.80	8.70
Turnout		152,632	62.87	19.99
Registered electors		242,771		
AIADMK gain from DMK		Swing	0.02	

=== 2001 ===
2001 Tamil Nadu Legislative Assembly election: Thiyagarayanagar
Party	Candidate	Votes	%	±%
DMK	J. Anbazhagan	57,875	48.55	New
AIADMK	E. V. K. Sulochana Sampath	55,376	46.45	+22.33
MDMK	K. Thyagarajan	3,697	3.10	New
Margin of victory		2,499	2.10	−40.94
Turnout		119,216	42.88	−12.82
Registered electors		277,999		
DMK gain from TMC(M)		Swing	-18.61	

=== 1996 ===
1996 Tamil Nadu Legislative Assembly election: Thiyagarayanagar
Party	Candidate	Votes	%	±%
TMC(M)	A. Chellakumar	76,461	67.16	New
AIADMK	S. Vijayan	27,463	24.12	−37.07
BJP	S. Srinivasan	5,285	4.64	+0.39
JD	K. Jagaveera Pandian	1,959	1.72	New
PMK	D. Kuppusamy	940	0.83	New
Margin of victory		48,998	43.04	13.31
Turnout		113,853	55.70	3.63
Registered electors		208,349		
TMC(M) gain from AIADMK		Swing	5.97	

=== 1991 ===
1991 Tamil Nadu Legislative Assembly election: Thiyagarayanagar
Party	Candidate	Votes	%	±%
AIADMK	S. Jayakumar	64,460	61.19	+39.65
DMK	S. A. Ganesan	33,147	31.47	−11.56
BJP	R. Durai	4,479	4.25	+2.94
PMK	A. Krishnamurthy Alias A. K. Morthy	2,137	2.03	New
Margin of victory		31,313	29.73	10.62
Turnout		105,341	52.07	−13.24
Registered electors		204,830		
AIADMK gain from DMK		Swing	18.16	

=== 1989 ===
1989 Tamil Nadu Legislative Assembly election: Thiyagarayanagar
Party	Candidate	Votes	%	±%
DMK	S. A. M. Ganesan	49,772	43.03	New
INC	K. Sourirajan	27,668	23.92	−25.34
AIADMK	V. Balasubramainan	24,920	21.54	New
AIADMK	Jeppiaar	8,268	7.15	New
BJP	M. S. Nithyanandam	1,517	1.31	−5.66
Independent	N. Manickam	821	0.71	New
Independent	A. Kittappan	663	0.57	New
Margin of victory		22,104	19.11	10.19
Turnout		115,667	65.31	1.88
Registered electors		178,867		
DMK gain from INC		Swing	-6.23	

=== 1984 ===
1984 Tamil Nadu Legislative Assembly election: Thiyagarayanagar
Party	Candidate	Votes	%	±%
INC	K. Sourirajan	49,038	49.26	New
JP	G. Kalivaradan	40,154	40.34	New
BJP	K. Jana Krishnamurthi	6,945	6.98	+2.56
Independent	M. K. Srinivasan	2,137	2.15	New
Margin of victory		8,884	8.92	1.24
Turnout		99,550	63.43	7.99
Registered electors		160,537		
INC gain from GKC		Swing	-1.32	

=== 1980 ===
1980 Tamil Nadu Legislative Assembly election: Thiyagarayanagar
Party	Candidate	Votes	%	±%
GKC	K. Sourirajan	42,566	50.58	New
DMK	R. E. Chandran Jeyapal	36,100	42.89	+11.98
BJP	K. Sanckar	3,716	4.42	New
JP	T. Swaminathan	1,462	1.74	New
Margin of victory		6,466	7.68	6.32
Turnout		84,164	55.44	13.32
Registered electors		153,113		
GKC gain from DMK		Swing	19.66	

=== 1977 ===
1977 Tamil Nadu Legislative Assembly election: Thiyagarayanagar
Party	Candidate	Votes	%	±%
DMK	R. E. Chandran Jayapal	23,346	30.91	−16.27
AIADMK	K. Krishnamoorthy	22,316	29.55	New
JP	Jana Krishnamoorthi	18,020	23.86	New
INC	A. J. Doss	7,833	10.37	−37.95
Independent	K. Sowrirajan	2,387	3.16	New
Independent	K. Kalyanasundaram	560	0.74	New
Independent	D. Jayakanthan	481	0.64	New
Margin of victory		1,030	1.36	0.22
Turnout		75,522	42.12	−23.54
Registered electors		180,871		
DMK gain from INC		Swing	-17.41	

=== 1971 ===
1971 Tamil Nadu Legislative Assembly election: Thiyagarayanagar
Party	Candidate	Votes	%	±%
INC	K. M. Subramaniam	37,100	48.32	New
DMK	D. V. Narayanasamy	36,221	47.18	−10.18
ABJS	K. Narayan Rao	1,880	2.45	New
Independent	Thirunagar Rathinam	1,187	1.55	New
Margin of victory		879	1.14	−14.07
Turnout		76,775	65.66	−6.68
Registered electors		121,232		
INC gain from DMK		Swing	-9.03	

=== 1967 ===
1967 Madras Legislative Assembly election: Thiyagarayanagar
Party	Candidate	Votes	%	±%
DMK	M. P. Sivagnanam	37,662	57.36	+16.34
Independent	K. M. Subramaniam	27,669	42.14	New
ABJS	Lakshminarasimhan	333	0.51	New
Margin of victory		9,993	15.22	5.29
Turnout		65,664	72.34	2.74
Registered electors		92,089		
DMK hold		Swing	16.34	

=== 1962 ===
1962 Madras Legislative Assembly election: Thiyagarayanagar
Party	Candidate	Votes	%	±%
DMK	Kanchi Manimozhiar	35,402	41.02	New
INC	Guntur Narasimha Rao	26,834	31.09	−14.01
SWA	C. Damodaram	9,196	10.65	New
Independent	Krishnamoorthy	8,002	9.27	New
TNP	K. Murugesan	4,653	5.39	New
Independent	M. K. Srinivasan	1,424	1.65	New
Independent	A. S. Jesubatham	566	0.66	New
Margin of victory		8,568	9.93	−2.53
Turnout		86,308	69.61	36.26
Registered electors		128,854		
DMK gain from INC		Swing	-4.08	

=== 1957 ===
1957 Madras Legislative Assembly election: Thiyagarayanagar
Party	Candidate	Votes	%	±%
INC	K. Vinayakam	16,813	45.10	New
Independent	A. S. Jesupatham	12,170	32.65	New
Independent	S. Krishnamoorthy	8,296	22.25	New
Margin of victory		4,643	12.45	
Turnout		37,279	33.35	
Registered electors		111,797		
INC win (new seat)				
