= Annibal Kennedy =

Indian politician

Annibal Kennedy (born 1965) is an Indian politician from Puducherry. He is a member of the Puducherry Legislative Assembly from Oupulam Assembly constituency in Puducherry district. He won the 2021 Puducherry Legislative Assembly election representing the Dravida Munnetra Kazhagam.

== Early life and education ==
Kennedy is from Puducherry, India. He resides at Sarvarirayalu Street, Puducherry. He is the son of Annibal Victor. He completed his BA in 1990 at Tagore Arts and Sciences college, Puducherry. He is a real estate agent.

== Career ==
He won from Aupulam Assembly constituency representing the Dravida Munnetra Kazhagam in the 2021 Puducherry Legislative Assembly election. He polled 13,433 votes and defeated his nearest rival and four time MLA, A. Anbalagan of the All India Anna Dravida Munnetra Kazhagam, by a margin of 4,780 votes. In the 2016 Puducherry Legislative Assembly election, he polled 8,503 votes but lost to A. Anbalagan of AIADMK, by a margin of 908 votes.
