= J. Anbazhagan =

Indian politician (1958–2020)

Member of the Tamil Nadu Legislative Assembly
- In office 13 May 2011 – 10 June 2020
- Preceded by: M. Karunanidhi
- Succeeded by: Udhayanidhi Stalin
- Constituency: Chepauk-Thiruvallikeni
- In office 13 May 2001 – 11 May 2006
- Preceded by: A. Chellakumar
- Succeeded by: V. P. Kalairajan
- Constituency: Theagaraya Nagar

Personal details
- Born: 10 June 1958
- Died: 10 June 2020 (aged 62) Chennai, Tamil Nadu, India
- Cause of death: COVID-19
- Party: Dravida Munnetra Kazhagam
- Relations: J. Karunanithi (younger brother)
- Parent: Jayaraman(father)

Jayaraman Anbazhagan (10 June 1958 – 10 June 2020) was an Indian politician and a 3 times MLA (2001, 2011 & 2016), a Member of the Tamil Nadu Legislative Assembly from the Chepauk-Thiruvallikeni constituency in Chennai District from 2011 to 2020.

As a representative of the Dravida Munnetra Kazhagam party, he was previously elected to the Theagaraya Nagar Constituency in 2001 elections, and was also defeated in the year 2006 election.

== Biography ==
He was elected in the elections of 2011 and was re-elected from the same Chepauk-Thiruvallikeni constituency in Chennai District in the elections of 2016.

A diehard party loyalist, Anbazhagan was also bold and was often referred to as the second Veerapandy S. Arumugam (a senior leader and former DMK minister from Salem who died a few years ago) within the DMK. A three time MLA - though he was a strong man, he could not become a Minister as he returned to the Assembly all the times when his party DMK was sitting in opposition.

Anbazhagan died from COVID-19 on his 62nd birthday on 10 June 2020, in Rela Institute & Medical Centre in Chromepet, Chennai during the COVID-19 pandemic in India, making him the first legislator in India to have died from the virus.

== Filmography ==
As producer

- Aadhi Baghavan (2013)

As distributor

- Yaaruda Mahesh (2013)
