= J. Karunanithi =

Indian politician

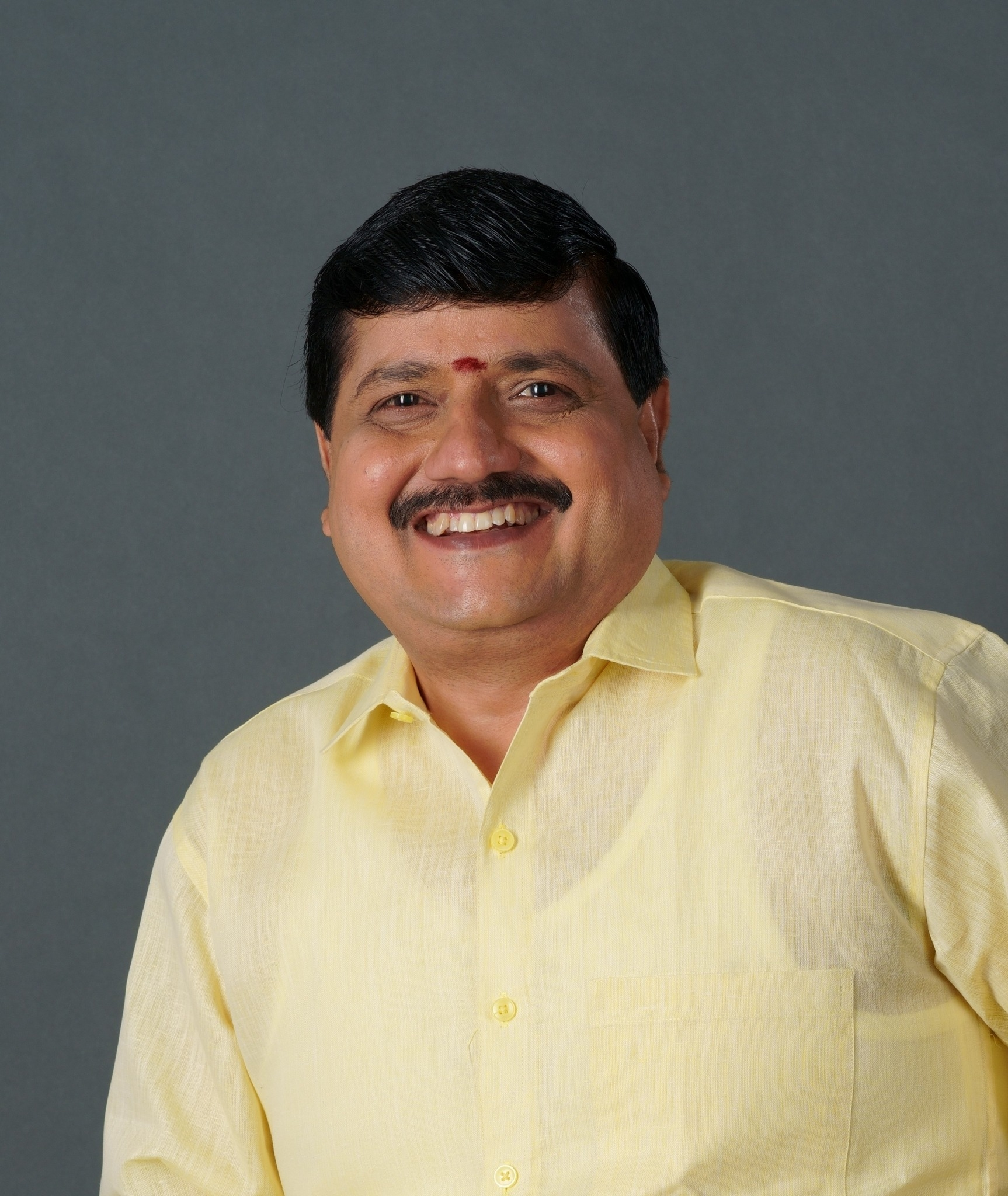

Member of the Tamil Nadu Legislative Assembly
- In office 2 May 2021 – 4 May 2026
- Preceded by: B. Sathiyanaarayanan
- Constituency: Thiyagaraya Nagar

Personal details
- Party: Dravida Munnetra Kazhagam
- Spouse: Punithavalli Karunanithi
- Relations: J. Anbazhagan (elder brother)
- Parent: K. Jayaraman (father)

Jayaraman Karunanithi is an Indian politician. He is a Member of Legislative Assembly of Tamil Nadu. He was elected from Thiyagaraya Nagar as a Dravida Munnetra Kazhagam candidate in 2021. He is the younger brother of Chennai J. Anbazhagan . Anbazhagan and Karunanithi learned politics together under the guidance of M. K. Stalin. Karunanithi brought in good infrastructure projects for his constituency. These include South Usman Road Flyovers, multiple Urban Primary Health Centers, and an integrated stormwater system. Anbazhagan endorsed Karunanithi as his political successor and gave him the opportunity to serve as a member of Corporation in 2006.

== Electoral performance ==
2021 Tamil Nadu Legislative Assembly election: Thiyagarayanagar
Party	Candidate	Votes	%	±%
DMK	J. Karunanithi	56,035	41.05	+5.8
AIADMK	B. Sathyanarayanan	55,898	40.95	+3.48
MNM	Pala. Karuppiah	14,567	10.67	New
NTK	S. Sivasankari	8,284	6.07	+4.61
NOTA	NOTA	1,617	1.18	−1.33
AMMK	R. Bharaneeswaran	782	0.57	New
Margin of victory		137	0.10	−2.12
Turnout		136,497	55.71	−2.22
Rejected ballots		84	0.06	
Registered electors		245,005		
DMK gain from AIADMK		Swing	3.58	
