= Pondicherry Municipal Council =

Regional government body in India

Pondicherry City Municipal Council புதுச்சேரி நகராட்சி Conseil Municipal de Pondichéry

Type
- Type: Municipality of the Pondicherry, Puducherry

Leadership
- Municipal Commissioner: Gowri Saroja
- Municipal Chairman: Vacant since 2011
- Seats: 42

Elections
- Voting system: First Past the Post
- Last election: 2006

Meeting place
- Pondicherry Municipality, Puducherry

Website
- pdymun.in

The Pondicherry Municipal Council (French: Conseil Municipal de Pondichéry; Tamil: புதுச்சேரி நகராட்சி) is the municipality of Pondicherry, India. Pondicherry has had a French system of municipal administration since 1880 and till the last poll held in 1968. Recently, in 2006 again municipal elections were held.

== History ==
The French Metropolitan Decree dated 12 March 1880 adopted a six-year term of office for mayors, municipal councillors and commune panchayats. From then all the civil record were maintained perfectly in Puducherry Union Territory.

In the past, municipal administration was virtually the pivot of the whole administrative machinery in Puducherry. It had several features that could serve as a role model for hassle-free administration. Puducherry had four municipalities in the past namely, Pondicherry, Karaikal, Mahe and Yanam.

It was the municipal elections that decided cession of the old colonies of French India to the Republic of India.

== Area and population ==
Area of Pondicherry Municipality is 19.46 km^{2} and its population is 220,750.

== Past communes ==
French Metropolitan Decree (12 March 1880) divided the entire region into 8 communes. Each commune was provided with a conseil municipal (municipal council) consisting of mayors and deputy mayors and councillors for the administration of its affairs. Pondichéry had 18 sièges while other 7 communes had 12 sièges each, thus making Pondichéry settlement a total of 102 sièges.

- Pondicherry
- Ariyankuppam
- Mudaliarpettai
- Ozukarai
- Bahour
- Nettapakkam
- Villianur
- Mannadipet

== La Mairie De Pondichéry (Hotel de Ville) ==
There was a magnificent and elegant 19th-century municipality building situated close to the sea on the beach road in Pondicherry. The beautiful building was destroyed due to neglect. Now the Mairie functions from a makeshift building in Subbiah Salai in Pondicherry.

Le Dupleix, a villa built in the 18th century, was the residence of Mayor of Pondicherry. It is now a 14-roomed luxury heritage hotel.

== Election results of 1948 ==
In June 1948 the French and Indian governments came to an agreement as to how the future of the French settlements should be determined.

Municipal elections were held in Pondicherry, Karikal and Yanam on 24 October 1948. The two main parties were the French India Socialist Party (Socialists), who favoured the continuance of French rule, and the Indian National Congress Party, who favoured union with India.

- Total seats-102
  - Socialists-83
  - Congress-13
  - Independents-09

== Past mayors ==
- Léon Guerre (1880, first mayor of Pondicherry)
- Munusamy Naicker - Villenour commune Mayor (1896-1899)
- Jean Henri Frederic Gaebelé (1860–1936), Mayor of Pondicherry (1899 and 1908–1928)
- Selvaraj Chettiar
- Joseph Latour (1955–1956)
- H.M. Cassime (1956–1961)
- Édouard Goubert (ex-mayor of Pondicherry and first chief minister of Puducherry)
- Dr. B. Sridevi (2006–2011) (last mayor of Pondicherry)

== Post-merger period ==
The areas comprising the French establishments of India were merged de facto with India on 1 November 1954. At the time of merger, the subject of local administration was dealt with by the Bureau des Affaires Politiques, and the Municipal Administration was covered by the decree of 12 March 1880. The Local Administration Department was constituted only on 1 July 1963 to deal with all matters connected with Local Administration at the secretariat level. The inspectorate of Municipal councils and Local Boards were formed in June 1967, to exercise control over the municipalities. Except a few changes the Municipal Administration continued to carry on according to French laws.

== Reorganization of local bodies in 1973 ==
While in Puducherry Union Territory, the decree of 12 March 1880, which provided for a common structure of municipal administration for urban as well as rural areas, continued to be in force. The Panchayat Raj system was in vogue in other parts of the country, and village administration has been carried out through people's representatives from the village level to the block level. Moreover, the old French laws had become so outdated that its replacement by a new law to meet the requirements of the changed circumstances was felt necessary. More over, the municipalities remained stagnant and the establishment charges had increased gradually to reach almost half of the income of the municipalities. Adequate funds were not left to meet even the essential as well as basic needs of the population. Further, much of the powers conferred on the municipalities by the various French laws ceased to have effect as these laws had been replaced by Indian laws. As a result, the municipal administration as conceived in the nineteenth century stood eroded, substantially. Hence, the system was replaced by the Pondicherry Village and Commune Panchayat Act, 1973 and the Pondicherry Municipalities Act, 1973 respectively to govern village and town administration. Both these acts came into force from 26 January 1974. Commune Panchayat Act provides for a two-tier system of Panchayat administration, one at the village level and the other at the commune level. The mayors and deputy mayors ceased to function with effect from that date. All the executive powers of the mayors stood transferred to the commissioners appointed under these acts.

Under the re-organized set up, the Inspectorate of Local Bodies was converted into a directorate headed by a director to deal with the administrative matters. He was conferred the ex officio secretariat status with two deputy directors to deal with "municipal administration" and "rural development" respectively.

== Absence of civil elections for three decades ==
For more than three decades, the municipalities and commune panchayats were staffed by the bureaucracy. Special officers stepped into the shoes of mayors and took charge after the civic bodies, formed in 1968, completed their six-year term in 1974.

== Current municipalities ==
- Pondicherry Municipality
- Ozhukarai Municipality
- Karaikal Municipality
- Yanam Municipality
- Mahe Municipality

Following the introduction of the Pondicherry Municipalities Act, 1973, four municipalities came into existence in Pondicherry, Karaikal, Mahe and Yanam towns. The jurisdiction of the Pondicherry Municipality extended to Pondicherry and Mudaliarpettai commune, which stood amalgamated to form a single municipality. The entities of Karaikal, Mahe and Yanam communes formed the municipalities of Karaikal, Mahe and Yanam. Under the new law, all functions excluding those assigned to the chairman, i.e., those hitherto exercised by the mayor appointed under the municipal decree came to be exercised by the commissioner. The mayors were also relieved of their day-to-day administrative responsibilities enabling them to be in greater contact with the public. Commissioners were appointed as the chief executive heads of the municipalities, in different ranks according to the grade of the municipalities. The erstwhile Ozhukarai Commune Panchayat was upgraded as a municipality with effect from 14 January 1994, and thereby the number of municipalities in this Union Territory has increased to five, and the Commune Panchayat became 10 in number.

== Current commune panchayats of Pondicherry district ==
Map showing 5 Communes of Pondicherry district with Ozhukarai and Pondicherry Municipality

- Ariankuppam
- Bahour
- Nettapakkam
- Villianur
- Mannadipet

== Present situation ==
The basic Law of Municipalities decree has now been replaced by the Pondicherry Municipalities Act 1973, which come into force on 26 January 1974. The Pondicherry Municipality constituted under the Act of 1973 is a selection grade municipality, and comprises the erstwhile Communes of Pondicherry, and Mudaliarpet and its headquarters in Pondicherry. The total number of council wards is 42. Out of 42 wards, 4 wards have been reserved for Scheduled caste. The mayor and deputy mayor have been re-designated as chairman and vice-chairman as per the act. The municipal council was dissolved on 31 March 1978 and a special officer has been appointed to exercise the powers and to perform the duties conferred and imposed upon the municipal council, including the standing committee and other Committees and that of the chairman and vice-chairman and other authorities other than the commissioner.

== Villianur ==
This is a rural town in Pondicherry district located 10 km from the city. Thirukaameeswarar Temple is one of the ancient, beautiful, and huge temples that is located in a beautiful rural town called "Villianur" (the ancient name is Vilvanallur, which means "vilva maranGal niraindha nalla vUr"), which is located about 10 km away (towards Villupuram) from Pondicherry. This temple is Renowned As "Periya Koil", which MeANs "BiG Temple" in Puducherry locality. The prime god is Lord Shiva and the prime goddess is Goddess Kokilambigai. In addition, there are also other Hindu gods such as Murugan, Vinayagar, ThakShAnaMoorthY, Perumal, Bhramah, Chandikeshwarar, Natarajar, Navagrahah, and 63 Naayanmaars. The pioneers in this temple say that the age of this temple is about 1000+ years. This seemed to be constructed by one of the Chola Kings. There is also a huge "temple pond". One of the famous festivals of this temple is the "Ther Thiruvizha" (Car Festival).

== See also ==
- Municipal Administration in French India
- Puducherry Legislative Assembly
- Municipalities of Puducherry
- Yanam Municipal Council
