= French establishments in India (constituency) =

The Établissements français de l'Inde, previously known as Indes orientales was a constituency in the French National Assembly between 1789 and 1954.

It was succeeded by India's Puducherry constituency in the Lok Sabha.

== Constituent Assembly of 1789 ==
Député des Indes orientales elected by the Assembly of Pondichéry.

- Philibert-Augustin-Bernard de Beylié (1789–1791)
- Joseph de Kerjean (1789–1790, abstentionist)
- Jean-Louis Monneron (1790–1791)

== Second Republic ==
- Lecour de Grandmaison (Jan–May 1849)
- Auguste Bourgoin (His deputy, sat from 24 April 1849 to 26 May 1849)

== Third Republic ==
- Pierre Desbassayns de Richemont (1871–1876, then senator from 1876 to 1882)
- Jules Godin (1876–1881, then senator from 1891 to 1900)
- Louis Alype dit Pierre-Alype (1881–1898)
- Louis Henrique-Duluc (1898–1906)
- Philema Lemaire (1906–1910)
- Paul Bluysen (1910–1924, then senator from 1924 to 1928)
- Gabriel Louis Angoulvant (from 1924 to 1928)
- Jean Coponat (1928–1932)
- Pierre Dupuy (1932–1942)

== Fourth Republic ==
- Deiva Zivarattinam (1945–1946) - UDSR
- Lambert Saravane (1946–1951) - UDSR, later with French India Socialist Party
- Édouard Goubert (1951–1954) - French India Socialist Party (UDSR affiliate)
