= Yanam Assembly constituency =

Constituency of the Puducherry legislative assembly in India

Coordinates: 16.737°N 82.211°E

Yanam
- Constituency No. 30 for the Puducherry Legislative Assembly
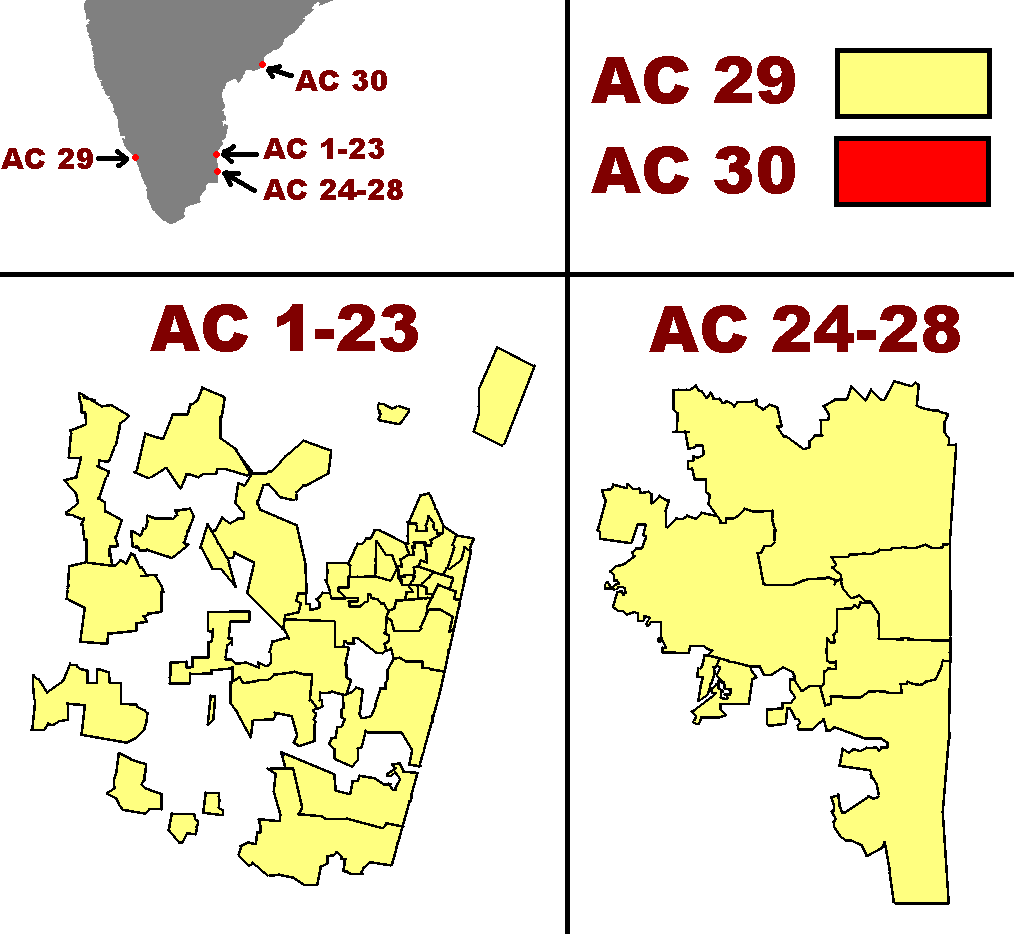

Constituency details
- Country: India
- Region: South India
- Union Territory: Puducherry
- District: Yanam
- Lok Sabha constituency: Puducherry
- Established: 1964
- Total electors: 37,747
- Reservation: None

Member of Legislative Assembly
- 16th Puducherry Legislative Assembly
- Incumbent Malladi Krishna Rao
- Party: All India N. R. Congress
- Elected year: 2026

Yanam is a legislative assembly constituency in the Union territory of Puducherry in India, covering the area of Yanam. Yanam assembly constituency is part of Puducherry Lok Sabha constituency.

== Member of the Assembly ==
=== Member of Representative Assembly of French India ===
- 1946: Madimchetty Satianarayanamourty; Kamichetty Sri Parassourama Varaprassada Rao Naidu,
- 1951: Madimchetty Satianarayanamourty; Canacala Tataya.

The de facto transfer of French settlements in India has happened on 1 November 1954. These four French settlements were organized as State of Pondicherry. Later, on 11 June 1955, The Government of India has dissolved the Representative Assembly by State of Pondicherry (Representative Assembly Decree Amendment) Order, 1955.

=== Member of Pondicherry Representative Assembly ===
- 1955: Erra Jagannadha Rao (Congress); Kamichetty Sri Parassourama Varaprassada Rao Naidu (Congress).
- 1959: Kanakalapeta constituency: Kamichetty Savithri (Ind.) (Note: For Kanakalapeta constituency, two independents secured exactly 707 votes each and so to decide the winner, lots were cast. Finally, Kamichetty Savithri was declared winner. In the same constituency, Congress candidate polled only 8 votes.); Adiandhrapeta constituency: Kamichetty Sri Parassourama Varaprassada Rao Naidu (Ind.).

As the people aspired for a popular government, the Indian Parliament enacted The Union Territories Act, 1963 that came into force on 1 July 1963, and the pattern of government prevailing in the rest of the country was introduced in this territory. The Pondicherry Representative Assembly was converted into the Legislative Assembly of Pondicherry on 1 July 1963 as per Section 54(3) of The Union Territories Act, 1963 and its members were deemed to have been elected to the Assembly. Thus, the MLAs of Yanam to the First Legislvative Assembly (1963–1964) were Smt.Kamichetty Savithri and Shri Kamichetty Sri Parassourama Varaprassada Rao Naidu.

== Members of the Legislative Assembly ==
The elections for the Puducherry Legislative Assembly are held since 1964. Before the Elections to the Pondicherry Legislative Assembly were held in August 1964, the constituencies were delimited by the delimitation commission and the entire territory was divided into 30 single-member constituencies and a single seat is allocated for Yanam region.

Year	Assembly	Member	Party
1964	2nd	Kamisetty Parasuram Naidu	Indian National Congress
1969	3rd	Kamisetty Parasuram Naidu	Independent
1974	4th	Kamisetty Parasuram Naidu	Independent
1977	5th	Kamisetty Parasuram Naidu	Janata Party
1980	6th	Kamisetty Parasuram Naidu	Independent
1985	7th	Kamisetty Parasuram Naidu	Indian National Congress
1990	8th	Raksha Harikrishna	Dravida Munnetra Kazhagam
1991	9th	Velaga Rajeswara Rao	Indian National Congress
1996	10th	Malladi Krishna Rao	Independent
2000^	10th	P. Shanumugam (politician)	Indian National Congress
2001	11th	Malladi Krishna Rao	Independent
2006	12th	Malladi Krishna Rao	Indian National Congress
2011	13th	Malladi Krishna Rao	Indian National Congress
2016	14th	Malladi Krishna Rao	Indian National Congress
2021	15th	Gollapalli Srinivas Ashok	Independent
2026	16th	Malladi Krishna Rao	All India N.R. Congress

== Election results ==
Vote share of Winning candidates
2026	55.44%
2021	49.07%
2016	61.36%
2011	80.95%
2006	64.89%
2001	57.34%
2000 (by-poll)	64.39%
1996	62.31%
1991	56.87%
1990	42.99%
1985	41.45%
1980	48.43%
1977	48.07%
1974	52.74%
1969	55.56%
1964	0.00%

=== 2026 ===
2026 Puducherry Legislative Assembly election: Yanam
Party	Candidate	Votes	%	±%
AINRC	Malladi Krishna Rao	19,863	55.44	▲8.24
INC	Gollapalli Srinivas Ashok	15,295	42.69	
NOTA	None of the above	195	0.54	▲0.20
TVK	Thota Raju	167	0.47	
IND	9 Independent Candidates	297	0.83	
OTH	1 Other Party Candidate	9	0.03	
Majority		4,568	12.75	▲10.88
Turnout		35,826	94.28	▲1.97
AINRC gain from Independent		Swing		

=== 2021 ===
2021 Puducherry Legislative Assembly election: Yanam
Party	Candidate	Votes	%	±%
IND	Gollapalli Srinivas Ashok	17,132	49.07	
AINRC	N. Rangaswamy	16,477	47.20	▲11.66
NOTA	None of the above	118	0.34	▼0.08
Amma Makkal Munnettra Kazagam	Pedapati Ramesh Babu	92	0.26	
BSP	Sunkara Karthik	90	0.26	
IND	11 Independent Candidates	1,001	2.87	
Majority		655	1.87	▼23.95
Turnout		34,910	92.31	▼0.42
Independent gain from INC		Swing		

=== 2016 ===
2016 Puducherry Legislative Assembly election: Yanam
Party	Candidate	Votes	%	±%
INC	Malladi Krishna Rao	20,801	61.36	▼19.59
AINRC	Tirikoty Bairava Swamy	12,047	35.54	
AIADMK	Manchala Satya Sai Kumar	343	1.01	▼15.42
IND	Pemmadi Durga Prasad	250	0.74	
BJP	Ramadas Kanakala	148	0.44	▲0.04
NOTA	None of the above	144	0.42	
IND	6 Independent Candidates	166	0.49	
Majority		8,754	25.82	▼38.70
Turnout		33,899	92.73	▼3.05
INC hold		Swing		

=== 2011 ===
2011 Puducherry Legislative Assembly election: Yanam
Party	Candidate	Votes	%	±%
INC	Malladi Krishna Rao	23,985	80.95	▲16.02
AIADMK	Manchala Satya Sai Kumar	4,867	16.43	▲15.80
BJP	Kamichetty Srirama Murthy Naidu	119	0.40	
IND	7 Independent Candidates	660	2.23	
Majority		19,118	64.52	▲29.71
Turnout		29,631	95.78	▼0.96
INC hold		Swing		

=== 2006 ===
2006 Puducherry Legislative Assembly election: Yanam
Party	Candidate	Votes	%	±%
INC	Malladi Krishna Rao	11,763	64.93	▲63.26
IND	Raksha Hari Krishna	5,457	30.12	
BVP (Note: Buddhiviveki Vikas Party)	Elipe Rajkumar	464	2.56	
AIADMK	Manchala Satya Sai Kumar	114	0.63	▲0.11
IND	6 Independent Candidates	233	1.29	
Majority		6,306	34.81	▲15.75
Turnout		18,117	96.74	▲13.31
INC gain from Independent		Swing		

=== 2001 ===
2001 Pondicherry Legislative Assembly election: Yanam
Party	Candidate	Votes	%	±%
IND	Malladi Krishna Rao	8,959	57.34	
BJP	Gollapalli Gangadhara Pratap	5,981	38.28	▲4.53
INC	Elaprolu Chittibabu	261	1.67	▼62.72
IND	Vegeshna Subba Raju	161	1.03	
AIADMK	Giddi Sri Hari Rao	82	0.52	
IND	4 Independent Candidates	180	1.15	
Majority		2,978	19.06	▼11.58
Turnout		15,624	83.43	
Independent gain from INC		Swing		

=== 2000 by-election ===
2000 Pondicherry by-election: Yanam
Party	Candidate	Votes	%	±%
INC	P. Shanmugam	8,888	64.39	▲37.81
BJP	G. Gangadhara Pratap	4,659	33.75	
IND	K. Prasada Rao	145	1.05	
IND	K. Sivaprasad	111	0.81	
Majority		4,229	30.64	▼5.09
Turnout		13,803		
INC gain from Independent		Swing		

=== 1996 ===
1996 Pondicherry Legislative Assembly election: Yanam
Party	Candidate	Votes	%	±%
IND	Malladi Krishna Rao	8,445	62.31	▲62.26
INC	Velaga Rajeswara Rao	3,602	26.58	▼30.29
IND	Kamichetty Venugopalarao Naidu	1,347	9.94	
IND	Kotnala Prabhakara Rao	58	0.43	
IND	Kapaganty Murali	36	0.27	
IND	Elipe Raj Kumar	33	0.24	
IND	Yerra Subrahmanyeswara Rao	21	0.15	
IND	Malladi Udhaya Lakshmi	12	0.09	
Majority		4,843	35.73	▲21.12
Turnout		13,745	86.68	▲3.29
Independent gain from INC		Swing		

=== 1991 ===
1991 Pondicherry Legislative Assembly election: Yanam
Party	Candidate	Votes	%	±%
INC	Velaga Rajeswara Rao	6,331	56.87	▲28.78
DMK	Raksha Hart Krishna	4,704	42.26	▼0.73
IND	Sirajuddin Mohammed Ahammed	51	0.46	
IND	Maroju Veera Nageswara Rao	27	0.24	
IND	Pampana Bhaskara Adinarayana	13	0.12	
IND	Malladi Krishna Rao	6	0.05	
Majority		1,627	14.61	▼0.29
Turnout		11,230	83.39	▼2.33
INC gain from DMK		Swing		

=== 1990 ===
1990 Pondicherry Legislative Assembly election: Yanam
Party	Candidate	Votes	%	±%
DMK	Raksha Harikrishna	4,632	42.99	▲38.29
INC	Velaga Rajeshwara Rao	3,027	28.09	▼13.36
IND	Kamichetty Venkata Venu	2,955	27.42	
BSP	Kamuju Srinivasa Rao	121	1.12	
IND	Gopala Rao Naidu Bapanna	27	0.25	
IND	Mohamed Ben Saleha	13	0.12	
Majority		1,605	14.90	▲9.36
Turnout		10,869	85.72	▼1.55
DMK gain from INC		Swing		

=== 1985 ===
1985 Pondicherry Legislative Assembly election: Yanam
Party	Candidate	Votes	%	±%
INC	Kamisetty Parasuram Naidu	2,884	41.45	▼1.64
IND	Ratcha Harikrishna	2,498	35.91	
TDP	Ponugumatla Vishnu Murty	1,248	17.94	
DMK	Mohamed Ahamed Sirajuddin	327	4.70	
Majority		386	5.54	▲0.20
Turnout		7,011	87.27	▼0.14
INC gain from Independent		Swing		

=== 1980 ===
1980 Pondicherry Legislative Assembly election: Yanam
Party	Candidate	Votes	%	±%
IND	Kamisetty Parasuram Naidu	2,433	48.43	
INC(I)	Abdul Khader Jeelani Mohammed	2,165	43.09	▼3.43
JP	Ponugumatla Vishnumurthy	426	8.48	▼39.59
Majority		268	5.34	▲3.79
Turnout		5,228	87.41	▲1.87
Independent gain from JP		Swing		

=== 1977 ===
1977 Pondicherry Legislative Assembly election: Yanam
Party	Candidate	Votes	%	±%
JP	Kamisetty Parasuram Naidu	2,047	48.07	▲0.66
INC	Abdul Khadar Jeelani Mohammed	1,981	46.52	
IND	Satyamurty	230	5.40	
Majority		66	1.55	▼5.33
Turnout		4,308	85.54	▼4.74
JP gain from Independent		Swing		

=== 1974 ===
1974 Pondicherry Legislative Assembly election: Yanam
Party	Candidate	Votes	%	±%
IND	Kamisetty Parasuram Naidu	2,284	52.74	▼2.82
INC	Naidou Maddimsetty Satyamurty	1,986	45.86	▲1.42
AIADMK	C. S. Jayalakshmi	61	1.41	
Majority		298	6.88	▼4.24
Turnout		4,503	90.28	▲0.63
Independent hold		Swing		

=== 1969 ===
1969 Pondicherry Legislative Assembly election: Yanaon
Party	Candidate	Votes	%	±%
IND	K. S. P. V. Rao Naidu	2,287	55.56	
INC	Yarra Zagannadharao	1,829	44.44	
Majority		458	11.12	
Turnout		4,201	89.65	
Independent gain from INC		Swing		

=== 1964 ===
1964 Pondicherry Legislative Assembly election: Yanam
Party	Candidate	Votes	%	±%
INC	Kamisetty Parasuram Naidu	Unopposed		
INC win (new seat)				

=== Pondicherry Representative Assembly ===
==== Assembly Elections 1964 ====
1964 Pondicherry Legislative Assembly election: Yanam
Party	Candidate	Votes	%	±%
INC	Kamichetty Sri Parasurama Varaprasada Rao Naidu	0	0	0
INC gain from Independent		Swing		

==== Assembly Elections 1955 ====
1955 Pondicherry Representative Assembly election: Yanam
Party	Candidate	Votes	%	±%
INC	Kamichetty Sri Parasurama Varaprasada Rao Naidu	0	0	0
INC	Yerra Jagannadha Rao	0	0	0
INC gain from Independent		Swing		

=== French India ===
==== Assembly Elections 1951 ====
1951 French India Representative Assembly election: Yanaon
Party	Candidate	Votes	%	±%
	Madimchetty Satianarayanamourty	1,042	100	0
	Canacala Tataya	1042	100	0
		Swing		

==== Assembly Elections 1946 ====
1946 French India Representative Assembly election: Yanaon
Party	Candidate	Votes	%	±%
	Madimchetty Satianarayanamourty	1,103	100	0
	Kamichetty Sri Parassourama Varaprassadaraw Naidou	1103	100	0
	Mohamed Zicria	0	0	0
	Erra Satianarayanamourty	0	0	0
		Swing		

== See also ==
- Yanaon
- Representative Assembly of French India
- Pondicherry Representative Assembly
