= Coup d'état of Yanaon =

1954 coup in French colonial enclave in India

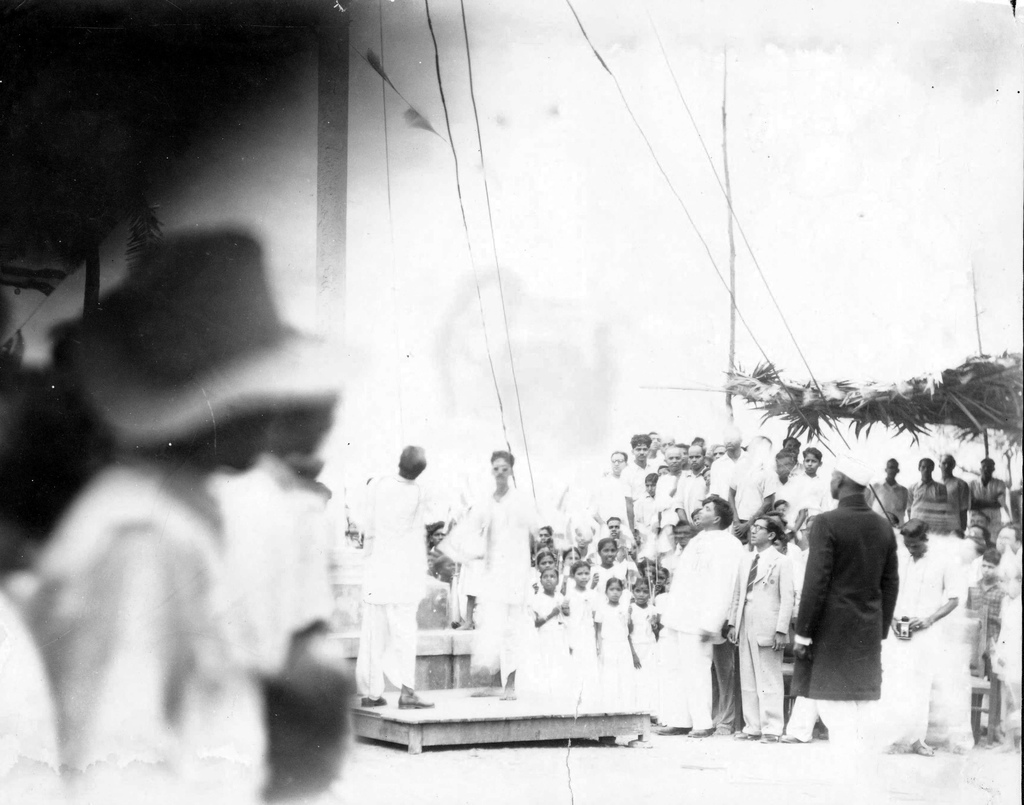
- Flag hoisting following the coup
Date	13 June 1954
Location	Yanaon, French settlements in India
Result	Crisis resolved

Belligerents
Anti-integration faction	Pro-merger faction

Commanders and leaders
Samatam Krouschnaya Kamichetty Sri Parassourama Varaprassada Rao Naidu Kamichetty Venougopala Rao Naidou	Dadala Raphael Ramanayya V. Subbiah Edouard Goubert Madimchetty Satianandam

A coup d'état took place in Yanam, India, in 1954 as India and France held negotiations regarding the future of French settlements in India. Yanam, along with Pondicherry, Karikal, and Mahé, was one of four small French colonial enclaves remaining in India after its 1947 independence from Britain. Though widely separated along both of India's coasts, the towns were collectively known as Pondicherry (French: Pondichéry; Indian English: Puducherry), after the largest of the settlements.

Yanam had pro-France (anti-integration) leaders such as Samatam Krouschnaya, Kamichetty Sri Parassourama Varaprassada Rao Naidu, and Kamichetty Venougopala Rao Naidou, as well as pro-India (pro-merger) leaders like Dadala Raphael Ramanayya, V. Subbiah, Edouard Goubert and Madimchetty Satianandam. While Krouschnaya would remain committed to France, most of the anti-integration leaders later switched to the pro-merger camp. The integration of the colony into India was further hastened by the active intervention of India's consul, Kewal Singh.

The coup d'état of Yanaon was interpreted differently by different people. While Indian nationalists considered it an act of liberation, some pro-French leaders saw it as an act of treachery.

== Causes ==
After India gained its independence from Britain in 1947, there was immense pressure on France to relinquish control of its small Indian territories. Some areas were quickly ceded, but others, with deeper French cultural ties, were reluctant to sever ties with France, or wanted to negotiate special status within India. In 1948 the Indian and French governments agreed that the future political status of Puducherry would be determined by referendum of its residents; that October, in elections widely seen as unfair, pro-French councillors won nearly every Municipal Assembly seat in Pondicherry territory.

In Yanam, there was a particularly strong pro-French fraction, which prompted a strong reaction by Nationalist Indians, led by former French policeman Dadala Raphael Ramanayya and activist Sellane Naicker. Tensions escalated over a period of years. The French police cracked down on pro-merger activists, while gangs of goondas harassed, threatened, and beat supporters of the rival side.

Since Yanam was small in area and population, Kewal Singh wanted to seize it first. On the night of 11 April 1954, at a conference at Kandamangalam, he asked Dadala Raphael Ramanayya for a plan for its liberation, which ultimately resulted in the coup d'état.

== Before the coup ==
On 10 December 1953, R.K. Tandon was transferred and Kewal Singh took his place as India's consul. He was able to wean some of the anti-merger leaders and members of the representative assembly away from the pro-France camp, and took them to New Delhi.

The movement for unification with India gathered momentum under V. Subbiah, and gained a powerful ally when Edouard Goubert switched his loyalty to the pro-merger camp. A momentous event in the independence movement of Pondicherry occurred on 18 March 1954, when the members of the executive council, the mayor of Pondicherry, and leaders from seven adjoining communes proclaimed their decision to merge with India, without a referendum. All of the communes in Karaikal soon followed suit. This decision was to be confirmed by the representative assembly.

When the French India Socialist Party initiated moves to ratify the merger resolution, the French Governor scuttled it by postponing the session. Provoked by this, the Socialists made plans to capture the outlying communes one by one, then move on Pondicherry. The Communist Party of India was also ready to launch a campaign to merge Pondicherry with India. Accordingly, the leaders of the French India Socialist Party hoisted the Indian National Flag atop the Nettapakkam police station on the last day of March in 1954. Thus a provisional government, with Edouard Goubert as the head, was formed in the enclave of Nettapakkam. The Indian Armed Reserve was posted around its borders.

In the meanwhile, negotiations were going on between the governments of India and France. Kewal Singh met all the leaders of the provisional government at a conference in Kandamangalam in the night of 11 April 1954. He explained that the French authorities were not taking the provisional government at Nettapakkam seriously. He suggested that if the leaders wanted real liberation of all settlements, they should occupy any of the big four settlements. Subsequently, a plan was formed for Dadala Raphael Ramanayya to liberate Yanam.

On 13 April 1954, Dadala arrived in Yanam and proceeded to neighbouring Kakinada (a town in the adjacent Indian state of Andhra Pradesh) the next day. In Yanam, he was warned that he could be captured or killed if he ventured to start a nationalist agitation there. Next day Dadala was ambushed by the French administration's police at Farampeta village but managed to escape back to Indian territory.

Dadala also purchased a large number of Indian flags and started a house-to-house campaign, requesting students and their leaders to organise a meeting in the town hall grounds. Along with his new nationalistic recruits, he hired lorries and made tours in the streets of Yanam, inviting the people to meetings.

The French colonial police also raided some villages on Indian territory. Loudspeakers were installed around Yanam town, that played patriotic songs and explained to people the reasons for merger with India. Inside Yanam, anti-merger leaders such as Samatam Krouschnaya and Kamichetty Sri Parasurama Varaprasada Rao Naidu also organised meetings and counter-processions against the merger.

At the beginning of June, the secretary-general of the French administration of Pondicherry met Dadala and informed him that the government was transferring the two European officials who were residing in Yanam. He requested safety of these officials from the nationalist volunteers while leaving the place. Dadala accompanied the two officials till Kakinada from where they departed by train to Pondicherry.

== Preparation for the coup ==
Dadala made arrangements to take over the administration of Yanam after consultation with the officials of Kakinada and other pro-merger Yanam leaders, such as Madimchetty Satianandam (the mayor of Yanam), Yerra Jagannatha Rao, Kamichetty Sri Parasurama Varaprasada Rao Naidu, and Kanakala Tatayya Naidou. Kamichetty Parasuram Naidu agreed to join the pro-merger camp.

Satianandam fled from Yanam fearing persecution by the French colonial administration and his home was ransacked. 78-year-old physician Samatam Krouschnaya, a pro-France leader, was appointed interim mayor of Yanam. He was by now the lone anti-integration leader fighting against the merger.

== Coup d'État de Yanaon ==
In the early morning of Sunday, 13 June 1954, Dadala marched at the head of a few thousand non-violent and peaceful volunteers from Kakinada towards the bungalow of the chief administrator of Yanam, in order to capture it and hoist the Indian flag. Bayankar Achary, another Indian revolutionary and patriot was a member of the volunteer corps. Marching 50 yards ahead of his volunteers with a megaphone, he requested the French police and other officials to cooperate and surrender. The French police retaliated and threw grenades, which fell at 20 meters from Dadala and exploded harmlessly. Then they started firing on the unarmed volunteers.

The volunteers took shelter behind the Manyam Zamindar’s choultry. Several policemen stopped firing and ran away to lock themselves inside the police building fearing mob fury. The nationalists surrounded them and had them disarmed. The volunteers combed the town and arrested all pro-France leaders and conducted spot trials against them. When they admitted to their guilt, clemency was shown to them and nobody was harmed. The peaceful coup d'état of Yanam was announced by All India Radio and the mass media.

The Indian National Flag was hoisted on the top of administrator's bungalow. The pro-merger group formed a new provisional government of Yanam headed by Dadala and adopted a resolution declaring the liberation of Yanam.

== Death of Samatam ==
Another significant event that happened that day was the death of Samatam Krouschnaya. During that day, he battled alone against all pro-merger groups for the continuation of French sovereignty over Yanam. Samatam died while trying to jump from a wall at Pydikondala house.

== Aftermath ==
The coup d'état of Yanaon enraged the French authorities of Pondicherry. Rumours were spread to the effect that the French were dispatching a cruiser to Yanam to capture pro-merger leaders and to re-establish their authority. Just three days before the coup, the last colonial chief administrator of Yanam, George Sala, was recalled by André Ménard, the then Governor General of Pondicherry.

Dadala was appointed as acting commissioner of Yanam for 14 days. Towards the end of June 1954, Kewal Singh paid a visit to Yanam and requested Dadala's return to Pondicherry to continue his activities there. On 3 July, Dadala left Yanam, after having made all arrangements for its proper administration.

On 1 November 1954, Yanam was de facto transferred to India. Prime Minister of India Jawaharlal Nehru visited Pondicherry on 16 January 1955. Edouard Goubert, S. Perumal, Dadala and Sri Pakirisamy Pillai presented addresses to Pandit Nehru in a public meeting in the maidan of Gorimedu.

France declared it was not responsible for the events occurred after 13 June 1954 in the Treaty of Cession signed by French and Indian authorities on 28 May 1956.

Dadala was appointed as high-ranking officer in the department of the state of Andhra Pradesh until he retired on 29 June 1963, three days before the de jure and final merger of Yanam into the newly formed Indian Union territory of Pondicherry.

== See also ==
- Municipal Administration in French India
- Dadala Raphael Ramanayya
- Yanam
- Military coups in India
