= Yanam (disambiguation) =

Yanam is a town in Puducherry, India.

Yanam may also refer to:

- Yanam district, a district in Puducherry, India
  - Yanam Assembly constituency
  - Yanam Municipality
- Yanaon, a colony of French India from 1723 to 1954
- Yanam language, a Yanomaman language of Brazil and Venezuela
