= Kamisetty Venugopala Rao Naidu =

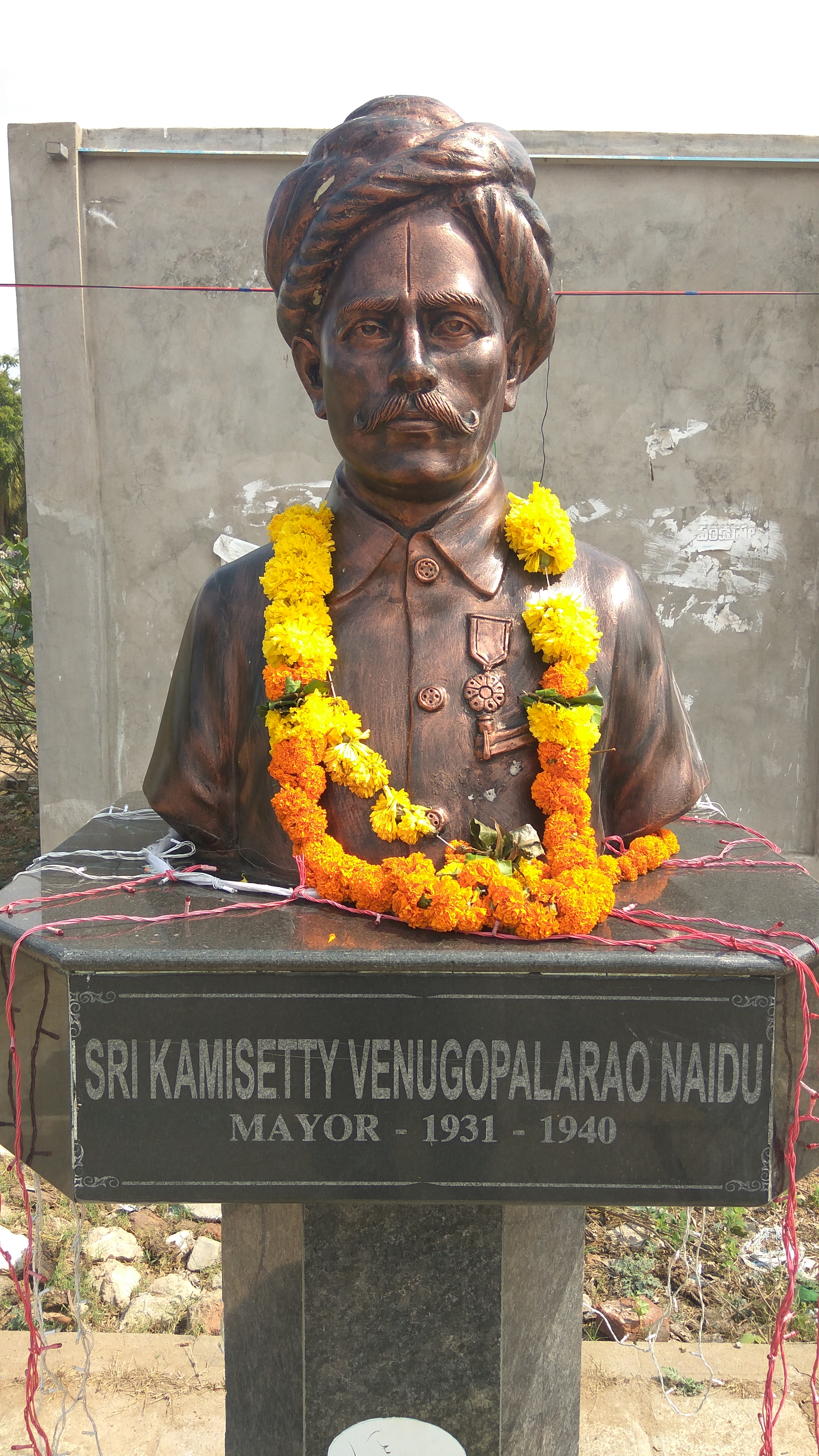
Mayor of Yanam.

Kamisetty Venugopala Rao Naidu (also spelled as Kamichetty Venougopala Rao Naidu) was Mayor and MLA of Yanaon during French rule in first half of 20th century.

== Offices held ==
Preceded by Post created	Membre du Conseil Municipal de Yanaon ?–1954	Succeeded by defunct (Coup d'État de Yanaon)
Preceded by Bezawada Bapa Naidou	Maire de Yanaon; 1931–1940	Succeeded by Madimchetty Satianandam
Preceded by Bezawada Bapa Naidou	President de Conseil Local de Yanaon; 14 November 1931–?	Succeeded by ?

== See also ==
- Yanam, French India
- Yanam Municipality
- Dadala Rafael Ramanayya
- Colonial History of Yanam
- Bouloussou Soubramaniam Sastroulou
- Kamichetty Sri Parassourama Varaprassada Rao Naidu
