= 1946 French India Representative Assembly election =

French India Representative Assembly election, 1946
- 15 December 1946
Party	National Democratic Front
Alliance	National Democratic Front (French India)

The first election to the Representative Assembly of French India (French: Assemblée Représentative des Indes Françaises) was held on 15 December 1946 to constitute the First Representative Assembly of French India. The election included Pondichéry (with 22 seats), Karaikal (12 seats), Chandernagor (5 seats), Mahé (3 seats) and Yanaon (2 seats). The election was won by the National Democratic Front of Deiva Zivarattinam, that won 30 out of 44 seats.

== Results in Yanaon ==
Election results of the first Pondicherry Representative Assembly in Yanaon
S. No	Name	Votes	Result
1	Madimchetty Satianarayanamourty	1,103	Elected
2	Kamichetty Sri Parassourama Varaprassadaraw Naidou	1,103	Elected
3	Mohamed Zicria	Nil	Not Elected
4	Erra Satianarayanamourty	Nil	Not Elected

== See also ==
- 1951 French India Representative Assembly election
- 1955 Pondicherry Representative Assembly election
- 1959 Pondicherry Representative Assembly election
