= Bezawada =

Bezawada may refer to:

- Vijayawada, a city in Andhra Pradesh, India
- Bejawada (film), 2011 Telugu film directed by Vivek Krishna

== Persons with the surname ==
- Bezawada Bapa Naidou, Indian politician, first Mayor of Yanam
- Bezawada Gopala Reddy, Indian politician, Chief Minister of Andhra State
- Bezawada Ramachandra Reddy, Indian politician, one of the founders of the Swatantra Party
- Bezwada Wilson (born 1966), Indian human rights activist
