= Municipal administration in French India =

Though the French established colonies in India in the 17th century itself, it was not until the end of the 19th century they started civil administration in French India.

== French Metropolitan Decree ==
A French Metropolitan Decree, dated 12 March 1880 adopted a six-year term of office for Mayors (Maire), municipal councillors (Conseil Municipaux) and commune panchayats (Communes). Thus French India has seen a French system of municipal administration.

In the past, municipal administration was virtually the pivot of the whole administrative machinery in French India. It had several features that could serve as a role model for hassle-free administration in French India.

== History of Communes from 1880 ==
The whole system was devised on the same pattern as prevailed in France and other French colonies. The Territory was originally divided into ten communes in 1880, namely:

- Pondichéry
  - Pondichéry (Chef-lieu de commune)
  - Oulgaret
  - Villenour
  - Bahour
- Karikal
  - Karikal (Chef-lieu de commune)
  - Grand'Aldee
  - Nedoungadu
- Chandernagore
  - Chandernagore (Chef-lieu de commune)
- Mahé
  - Mahé (Chef-lieu de commune)
- Yanaon
  - Yanaon (Chef-lieu de commune)

As the area were found too large for administration, by decree of 24 December 1907 they were re-organized into 17 communes, with effect from 21 February 1908.

- Pondichéry
  - Pondichéry (Chef-lieu de commune)
  - Ariancoupom
  - Mudaliarpeth
  - Oulgaret
  - Bahour
  - Nettapacom
  - Villenour
  - Tiroubouvane
- Karikal
  - Karaikal (Chef-lieu de commune)
  - Tirounallar
  - Nedoungadu
  - Kottucherry
  - Grand'Aldee
  - Neravy
- Chandernagore
  - Chandernagore (Chef-lieu de commune)
- Mahé
  - Mahé (Chef-lieu de commune)
- Yanaon
  - Yanaon (Chef-lieu de commune)

Consequent on the merger of Chandernagore with West Bengal, the number of communes have been reduced to sixteen. These sixteen local areas (communes) were declared as Municipalities and administered by Mayors and the Councils.

Except Pondicherry and Karikal which had 18 and 14 respectively, all other 14 communes had 12 seats each. Thus the total municipal council are 200 in number.

== Le chef-lieu de commune (Principal town) ==
French India had had five principal (Chef-lieu) communes. They are Pondichéry, Chandernagore, Karikal, Mahé and Yanaon.

== La Mairie (Hôtel de Ville) ==
The Mairie (Town Hall) in Pondicherry is called as Hôtel de Ville. It was magnificent and elegant 19th century municipality building situated close to the sea near Beach Road in Pondicherry.

Other municipalities of French India, i.e. Karikal, Mahé and Yanaon also have their respective Mairie halls at their place.

== Municipal wards (Sièges) ==
During French colonial rule, Pondichéry settlement had a total of 102 Sièges. Pondichéry commune had 18 Sièges while other 7 communes had 12 Sièges each. Karikal settlement had 74 Sièges. Chandernagore Municipality had 25 wards, Mahé Municipalité had 12 Sièges and Yanaon Municipalité had 12 Sièges. Then, they were called previously as Sièges instead of wards.

== Structure of municipality ==
Each ward (Siège) was represented by a municipal councilor (Conseiller Municipal). Each commune possessed a Mayor (Maire) and a Municipal council (Conseil Municipal) which managed the commune from the Mairie (city hall). The life-span of a Municipal council was six years, with one half of the membership renewed for every three years.

== Timeline of past elections held ==
- 1880 30 May
  - 1883
- 1886
- 1892
- 1898
  - 1902
- 1904

Re-organized into 17 new communes by decree of 25 December 1907 (w.e.f 21 February 1908)

- 1910
  - 1913
- 1916
  - 1919
- 1922
- 1928 9 May
  - 1931
- 1934 21 October
  - 1937
- 1940
- 1946 23 June

Re-elections held based on Indo-French agreement dated June 1948

- 1948 24 October (Regarding future of French colonies)
- 1954 18 October (Regarding merger with India)
  - de facto transfer to the Republic of India on 1 November 1954
  - No elections until de jure transfer
- 1962
- 1968
- 2006

== List of mayors until 1932 ==
The list of mayors of Pondicherry until 1932 is given below

- Emile Heuquet
- Léon Guerre (1880)
- Armand Gallois-Montbrun
- Gaston Pierre
- Munusamy Naicker - Villenour Commune Mayor (1897-1899)
- Henry Gaebelé (1899)
- Balaponnusamypoullé
- Gaston Pierre (second term)
- Henry Gaebelé (1908-1928)
- Jules Guerre
- Lucien Gallois-Montbrun

== First and last mayors of French India ==
- Pondichéry
  - First : Emile Heuquet
  - Last : Muthu Pillai
- Karikal
  - First : M. Gaudart
  - Last : V. Govindarajan
- Mahé
  - First : Advocate. Paduvankutty
  - Last : V.N. Purushothaman
- Yanaon
  - First : Bezawada Bapa Naidou
  - Last : Madimchetti Satianandam (de jure), Samatam Kistaya (de facto)
- Chandernagore
  - First : Charles Dumaine
  - Last : Kamal Prosad Ghosh

== Most important elections ==
Elections held on 24 October 1948 and 18 October 1954 are most crucial in the history of French India.

=== Chandernagore elections ===
Municipal elections were in August 1948, and were conducted more or less peacefully. The Congress Karma Parishad, an organization sponsored by Bengal members of the Indian Congress Party, won 23 of the 25 seats. The Parishad had stated its policy as one of merger with India.

On 15 December the new Municipal Council passed a resolution in favour of such a merger and requested both the French and Indian Governments to effect the change of administration "in a smooth and amicable manner before March 31, 1949".

- Total seats -25
  - Congress Karma Parishad - 23
  - Pro-French Group - 02

=== Election results of 1948 ===
In June 1948 the French and Indian Governments came to an agreement as to how the future of the French Settlements should be determined. Municipal elections were held in Pondichéry, Karikal and Yanam on 24 October 1948. The two main parties were the French India Socialist Party, who favoured the continuance of French rule, and the French India Congress (Congress), who favoured union with India.

- Pondichéry - 102
  - Socialists - 83
  - Congress - 13
  - Independents - 09
- Karikal - 74
  - Socialists - 64
  - Congress - 10
- Yanaon - 12
  - Socialists - 09
  - Independents - 03
- Mahé - 12
  - Socialists - 12 (Note: Owing to serious disturbances, elections were not held in Mahé in 1948. They were held on 27 February 1949.)

=== Election results of 1954 ===
Franco-Indian negotiations were resumed in early August 1954, that time in New Delhi. Nationalist agitation in the settlements was suspended while the negotiations were in progress. A compromise between the French and Indian points of view was worked out. India and France, following talks, issued a joint statement on 13 October 1954 announcing a procedure for deciding the status of the French settlements. Five days later, on 18 October a joint communiqué was issued stating that "all elected members of the Representative Assembly and municipal councils will meet on 18 October at Pondicherry to consider the joint proposals of the two Governments for a final settlement of the future of the establishments and to record their decision on these proposals as an expression of the wishes of the people". This historical meeting is called Kiloor Congress.

The importance of the Congress and the necessity of the members to attend the Congress were expressed in a circular, which was signed by the Secretary General for French India and dispatched to the elected members accompanied by the topographical map of the place where the congress was to be held together with the admission card. There was a proposal to hold the congress at karaikal, but that was set aside. Kizhur, a tiny hamlet was finally chosen in order to avoid the disturbances, which the presence of messrs. Goubert and Mouthoupoulle might have provoked if the congress had been held at Pondicherry. Monsieur Balasubramanian, President of Assemblée Représentative, acted as presiding officer of the congress. After considering the draft agreement put before them by the French and Indian Governments the Congress voted in secret ballot. An agreement for the de facto transfer of the Establishments was thereupon signed in Delhi on 21 October 1954.

- Total Voters - 178
  - For India - 170
  - For France - 8

== Date of events ==
Inde française
Colony	Liberation	de facto transfer	Treaty of Cession	de jure transfer	Merger
Pondichéry	-	1 November 1954	28 May 1956	16 August 1962	1 July 1963
Chandernagore	-	26 June 1949	28 February 1951	9 June 1952	1 October 1954
Karikal	-	1 November 1954	28 May 1956	16 August 1962	1 July 1963
Mahé	16 June 1954	1 November 1954	28 May 1956	16 August 1962	1 July 1963
Yanaon	13 June 1954	1 November 1954	28 May 1956	16 August 1962	1 July 1963

== See also ==
- Pondicherry Municipal Council
- Yanam Municipal Council
- Compagnie des Indes
- Coup d'État de Yanaon
- French colonial empire
- French India
- Representative Assembly of French India
