= Kamisetty Savithri =

Indian politician

Kamisetty Savithri (also spelled as Kamichetty Savithri; born 26 February 1923, date of death unknown) was an Indian politician from Yanam and was first MLA after de facto transfer from that constituency, between 1959 and 1964. She was also former Mayor of Yanam and wife of Kamisetty Parasuram Naidu, who was an undisputed leader until his death in Yanam. Savithri Nagar in Yanam is named after her. Savithri is deceased.

== Titles held ==
Preceded by Yerra Jagannadha Rao	Membre de l'assemblée réprésentative de Yanaon; 1959–30 June 1963	Succeeded by Defunct
Preceded by Created	MLA of Yanam; 1 July 1963–1964	Succeeded by Defunct
Preceded by Camidy Vincanna	Maire de Yanaon c.1964;c.1967	Succeeded by N.A.

== See also ==
- Puducherry Legislative Assembly
- Bouloussou Soubramaniam Sastroulou
- Samatam Krouschnaya
- 1959 Pondicherry Representative Assembly election
