= List of mayors of Yanam =

A French Metropolitan Decree, dated 12 March 1880 adopted a six-year term of office for Mayors (Maire), municipal councillors (Conseil municipaux) and commune panchayats (communes). Thus French India has seen a French system of municipal administration. In the past, municipal administration was virtually the pivot of the whole administrative machinery in French India. It had several features that could serve as a role model for hassle-free administration.

Then a total of 10 communes were formed in which Yanaon became one commune with a strength of 12 Municipal Councillors (conseillers municipaux). First elections were held on 30 May 1880. The 26 January 1974 Commune Panchayat Act provides for a two tier system of Panchayat administration, one at the Village level and the other at the Commune level. The Mayors and Deputy mayors ceased to function with effect from that date. All the executive powers of the Mayors stood transferred to the Commissioners appointed under these Acts.

Present Chairman and Vice-chairman of Yanam Municipal Council was Gidla Chandra Rao and Pendem Surya Prakash.

== List of Mayors ==
- French commune (1880–1954)
  - BEZAWADA Bapanaya Naidou (1880–1883)
  - PAINDICONDALA Subbaya (1883–1885)
  - BEZAWADA Bapanaya Naidou (1885–1886)
  - SAMATAM Venkatasubbaraidu (1886)
  - BEZAWADA Bapanaya Naidou (1886–1891)
  - KONA Narasaya (1891–1897)
  - ...(1897–1903)
  - BEZAWADA Bapanaya Naidou (1903–1912)
  - BEZAWADA Bapa Naidou (1925–1931)
  - KAMICHETTY Venougopala Rao Naidou (1931–1937)
  - ...(1937–1948)
  - MADIMCHETTY Satianandam (1948–1954)
  - SAMATAM Kistaya (1954)
- Indian municipality (1954–1974)
  - CAMIDI Vincanna (c.1961-c.1964)
  - KAMICHETTY Savithri (c.1964-c.1967)

== List of Municipal Chairpersons ==
Gidla Chandra Rao (2006-till date)

== See also ==
- Yanam Municipality
- Municipal Administration in French India
- Pondicherry Municipality
