= Students' Federation (French India) =

The Students' Federation (French: Fédération des étudiants) was a student movement in French India, founded by the Communist Party of French India on 6 March 1947. The launching of the Students' Federation came some months after the French India Students Congress had been formed. The Students' Federation took part in the pro-Independence protest in August 1947.
