= Mahé Socialist Party =

The Mahe Socialist Party (French: Parti socialiste de Mahé) was a political party in Mahé, French India. The party was a unit of the Indian Socialist Party. It had no links to the Socialist Party of French India of Edouard Goubert. Raghavan Mangalat was the secretary of the party.

The Mahe Socialist Party played a prominent role in the 1948 rebellion in Mahé. Several of its leaders were arrested. Raghavan Mangalat was sentenced to twenty years of imprisonment for his role in the revolt. The Mahe Socialist Party participated in the Joint Conference of the representatives of the people of the Portuguese and French Settlements in India, a body of parties formed in May 1951 supporting integration of Goa and French India into independent India.

The Mahe Socialist Party won one of the three seats assigned to Mahé in the August 1959 Pondicherry Representative Assembly election.
