= Congress Karma Parishad =

Political party in Chandernagore, French India

The Congress Karma Parishad ('Congress Action Association') was a political party in Chandernagore, French India. The Congress Karma Parishad was linked to the Indian National Congress. It was supported by Congress Party politicians from West Bengal. The party supported the integration of Chandernagore with India. Sachin Modak was the secretary of the Congress Karma Parishad.

The Congress Karma Parishad won a landslide victory in the August 1948 municipal polls in Chandernagore, capturing 22 out of the 24 seats in the municipal council. The main competitor of the Congress Karma Parishad in the elections, the communists (contesting as the National Democratic Front) were in a weakened position as the Communist Party of India had been banned. During the election campaign the Congress Karma Parishad was supported by the provisional Administrative Council (the governing body of the municipality). After the election, Deben Das became the president of the municipal council of Chandernagore. The Congress Karma Parishad passed a resolution calling for the immediate integration of Chandernagore with India without any plebiscite.
