= 1951 French India Representative Assembly election =

French India Representative Assembly election, 1951
- 16 December 1951

All 39 seats in the Representative Assembly of French India

The second election to the Representative Assembly (French: Assemblée représentative) was held on 16 December 1951 to constitute the Second Representative Assembly of French India.

== Results ==
Election results of the French India Pondicherry Representative Assembly in Mahé
S. No	Name	Votes	Result
1	Vadagaracarin Changarin	4,674	Elected
2	Naloupoureil Balagopalin	4,674	Elected
3	Vaneméry Nadeyi Pourouchouttamin	4,674	Elected

Election results of the first French India Representative Assembly in Yanaon
S. No	Name	Votes	Result
1	Madimchetty Satianarayanamourty	1,042	Elected
2	Canacala Tataya	1,042	Elected

== See also ==
- 1946 French India Representative Assembly election
- 1955 Pondicherry Representative Assembly election
- 1959 Pondicherry Representative Assembly election
