= Communist Party of French India =

Communist Party of French India Parti Communiste de l'Inde Française
- Secretary-General: V. Subbiah
- Merged into: Communist Party of India
- Student wing: Students' Federation
- Youth wing: Youth League
- Ideology: Communism

The Communist Party of French India (French: Parti communiste de l'Inde française) was a political party in French India. V. Subbiah was the secretary of the party.

== History ==
=== World War II and the National Democratic Front ===
The Communist Party of French India rose in prominence during the Second World War. At the time of the outbreak of the war the party was banned and its assets seized. However, the ban was lifted in September 1940 as the French Communist Party had called for support to the Allied war effort.

The communists came to dominate the National Democratic Front. On 6 March 1947 the Communist Party launched a students' wing, the Students' Federation.

=== Struggle for independence ===
Around August 1947, as independence of British India drew nearer, the Communist Party of French India changed its policy regarding independence and began advocating immediate merger with the rest of India. Until this point the party had advocated union with France in the short term, and integration with India in the long term. French authorities issued a ban on pro-independence rallies in French India. The Communist Party of French India joined trade unions, the French India National Congress, and the French India Students Congress in protesting against the ban. The Communist Party of French India issued a call to all municipal authorities to haul down the Flag of France on 15 August 1947 and hoist the Flag of India.

=== Persecution of Communists ===
Communists were persecuted in French India, partly due to the rivalry between Edouard Goubert (the leading pro-French politician in the colony) and V. Subbiah. Goubert's henchmen conducted lynchings of communist activists. In 1948 the French authorities served an arrest warrant against V. Subbiah. In January 1950 the office of the Communist Party, located in the private residence of V. Subbiah, was burnt down. The police chief was present at the scene, but police did not intervene. The houses of Communist Party of French India leaders Clemenceau and Annousamy were also torched by goondas.

The Communist Party contested the October 1948 municipal polls as part of the Progressive Democratic Party (a coalition between the communists and the Dravidar Kazhagam).

In mid-1951 the arrest warrant against V. Subbiah was withdrawn. V. Subbiah emerged as a major leader of the independence movement. In a public statement he called for the formation of a united front compromising the Communist Party and other pro-independence groups. The Tamil language weekly newspaper Sutantiram, published in India, became an important organ of the movement led by V. Subbiah.

=== 1954: Final phase of independence struggle ===
In early 1954 V. Subbiah addressed a mass meeting in the peripheries of Pondicherry, appealing on the population of the colony to leave past differences behind and unite in the struggle for independence. As tension in French India rose in March 1954, the Communist Party began to prepare a campaign of popular direct action demanding immediate merger with India. On 7 April 1954 the Communist Party mobilized protests, as the colonial government called out military forces on the streets of Pondicherry. V. Subbiah called upon the thousands of the refugees that had crossed into India to return to take part in the freedom struggle.

Tirubhuvanai was liberated by the communists on 6 April 1954, marking the climax of the freedom movement. Together with the French India Socialist Party and the Merger Congress a temporary united government for the area was set up by the Communist Party in Tirubhuvanai.

The strength of the communists in the struggle caught the attention of the international press, for example The New York Times warned of the possibility of a communist take-over in Pondicherry. The French communist newspaper l'Humanité on the other hand praised the people of French India for their courage in the struggle against colonial domination.

In the midst of the struggle, a proposal that the colony be converted into a French-Indian condominium was floated from French quarters. The Communist Party immediately rejected the proposal.

On 26 April 1954 the Communist Party took part in an All Party Conference. The conference condemned the violent repression against protestors in French India. On 29 April 1954 the Communist Party, Central Merger Congress and other leftist groups launched a joint front to coordinate struggles. At the meeting a decision was adopted that the struggles would be conducted along the lines of Gandhian non-violence.

On 9 August 1954 Pondicherry observed a hartal after a call from the Communist Party and the Youth Congress. V. Subbiah met with Jawaharlal Nehru on 13 August 1954 to discuss the prospects of the resistance struggle. On 1 November 1954 France left French India. V. Subbiah returned from exile, meeting a hero's welcome from jubilant masses.

== See also ==
- Communist Party of India
- French Communist Party
- List of communist parties in India
