= Dadala Raphael Ramanayya =

Indian nationalist leader and police officer (1908–1991)

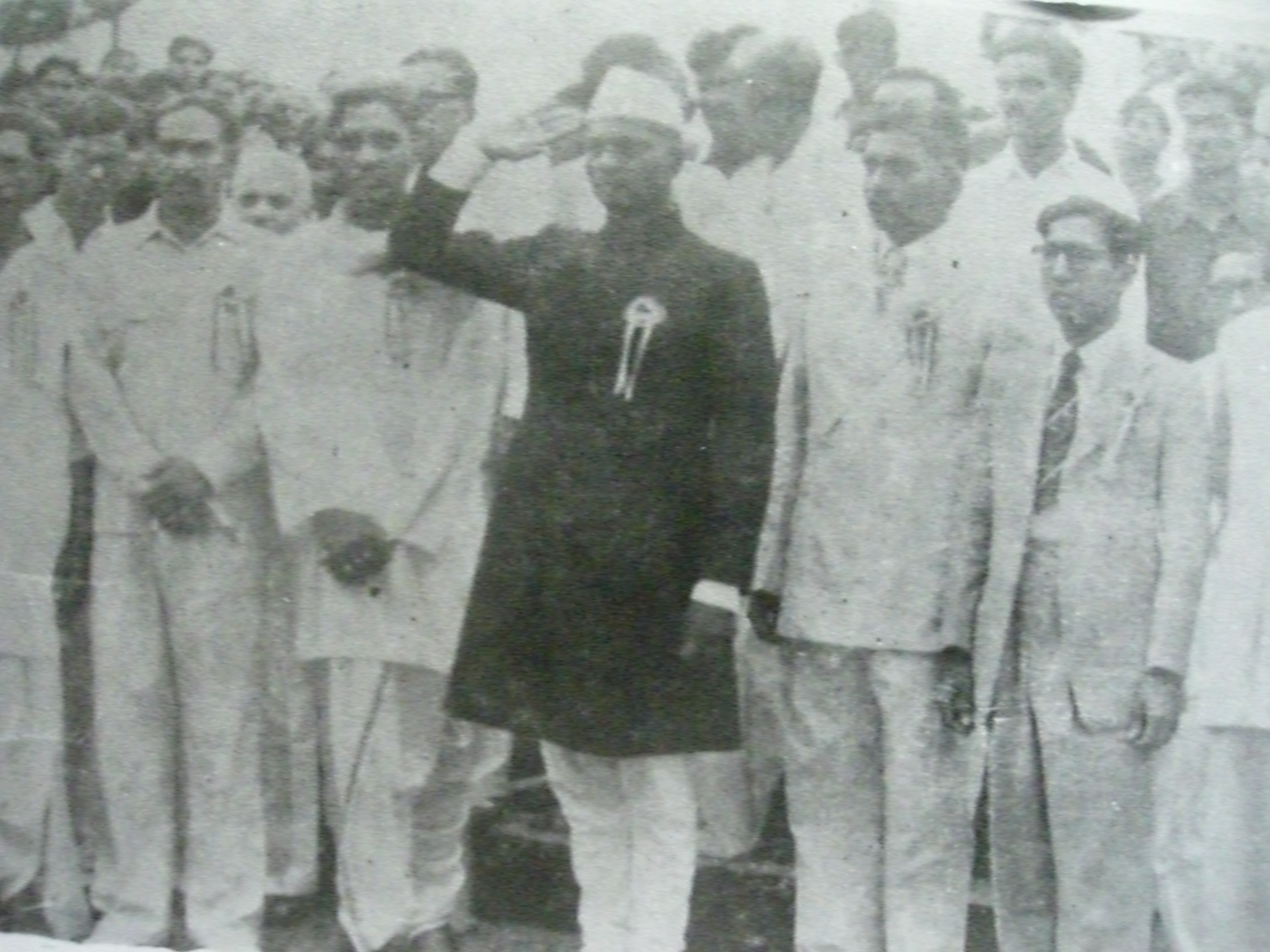
- Born: 30 June 1908; Yanam, French India
- Died: 5 May 1991 (aged 82); Andhra Pradesh, India

Dadala Raphael Ramanayya (30 June 1908 – 5 May 1991) was an Indian nationalist leader who was instrumental in the merger of the French territory of Yanam into the Republic of India.

== Early life ==
Ramanayya was born into a poor family from Farampeta, a tiny hamlet about two kilometers from Yanam. His father, Dadala Bhairvaswamy, was a farm worker; his mother's name was Ramanamma. Ramanayya was orphaned at the age of four and was taken under the care of his paternal grandmother Veeramma, alongside whom he had to work for food in the fields of landlords of the neighbouring villages. The French priests of Yanam Catholic Church, Father Artic and later Father Gangloff, took him under their patronage and educated him. Father Gangloff helped him to enter the high school of the Petit Seminaire college in Pondicherry and later to finish his Baccalaureate (B.A.) from the Government's Arts College, Pondicherry.

In February 1932, during his student days, on the occasion of Mardi Gras and a fancy dress procession, a few European students were seen misbehaving in public with some girls from a high family. The governor dismissed the petitions sent to him, saying, "The youngsters had some fun in jovial mood. Nothing is offending in it." Ramanayya was indignant when the sons of the governor and other high officials escaped without even an apology to the parents of the girls. He organized a student group to protest this, and beat up some European students in retaliation. He was immediately arrested along with another student, but due to great public outcry he was ordered released by the Governor of Pondicherry.

In February 1933, he passed a competitive examination for French language teachers, and worked for about two months as a teacher in Bahour. Later he passed, with high marks, a competitive examination for appointment as a Sub-Inspector of Police in Mudaliarpet.

== French police career ==
During this period, Sellane Naicker, though pro-French, had passed a bill in the assembly cutting the salaries of European officials. This enraged the French, who, through their cohorts, encouraged intimidation of Naicker's supporters in the municipal and assembly elections of 1934. Ramanayya made Mudaliarpet and all communes behind it, bastions against these goonda acts. This angered the French, and he was suspended from service by the Deputy Chief Justice. He was acquitted and reinstated three months later after a prolonged court battle.

In 1936 André Ménard (who later came back to India, in July 1950, as Governor of French settlements in India), the chef de cabinet and Secretary to the Governor's establishment, went into Bharati Mills to negotiate a settlement with striking workers, and was instead taken hostage pending fulfillment of their demands.

Ramanayya was the police officer in charge of the area, and he knew that any aggressive act against the French would be a serious affair that could harm the workers' safety, so he acted deftly to defuse the situation. With a swift surprise raid he entered the mills and liberated Ménard without any harm to either side.

After this incident he enjoyed great popularity among the French leadership in Pondicherry, some of whom even volunteered to be a godfather to his children. However, as happy as he was with his French friends, Ramanayya yearned to be an active part of the nationalist movement growing around him.

== Entry into nationalist movement ==
After Indian Independence from British rule, and in deference to the feelings of "Mahatma" Gandhi and Jawaharlal Nehru, France proposed a referendum in India to decide the fate of the French settlements. The referendum agreement was signed in June 1948. The main clause of this agreement expressly stated that there should be no internal or external pressure placed on voters during the referendum.

In 1948 the French India Socialist Party, a pro-French organization, was widely suspected of rigging the elections, and won all the seats in all but one of the Municipal Assemblies. Dr. P. Subbarayan, who was president of the P.C.C. of Tamilnad, and Dr. N. Rajkumar, Secretary for Foreign affairs of the Indian National Congress, saw the farce in these elections and sent a damaging report to Prime Minister Nehru. The first Consul General of India at Pondicherry, Sri Rasheed Ali Baig, did his best to boost the Nationalist movement, but was able to achieve little. In 1950 Sri R.K. Tandon replaced him, and Naiker, a Chevalier by title and an influential political figure of Pondicherry, persuaded Ramanayya to join and lead the existing nationalist movement.

On 14 September 1950 Ramanayya, along with Naicker, prepared a memorandum for Dr. Keskar, Deputy External Affairs minister of India, who had paid a visit to Pondicherry. This led to an immediate confrontation between him and his French superiors. His meeting with Keskar was considered treachery by the French Deputy Chief of Police, Monsieur Lagisqet, and the Chief of police, Captain Bouhard, who threatened him with arrest and punitive departmental actions. Ramanayya immediately resigned, and, expecting reprisals from the French police who now openly showed their contempt, moved his family to the safety of Cuddalore, a frontier town on the Indian side of the Penna River that separated the French and Indian territories.

== Life as a nationalist leader ==
In his first step as a political activist, Ramanayya chose the Bahour commune, inhabited by about 25,000 people, as his area of operations. He worked hard to enroll municipal members, especially youth, as members of the "French India liberation volunteer corp", an organisation which he founded to counter violent pro-French activists. He also co-founded, with Sellane, a pro-merger independence organization dubbed the "French India Merger Congress". Sellane accepted its presidency and Ramanayya became its secretary general. Their primary goal was to cancel the referendum, as in their view the French settlements were dominated by pro-French parties who had gained control of the voting process by threats and the subjugation of citizens.

Ramanayya's aggressive nationalist programmes in French territories soon disturbed and enraged the French government, who initially tried to woo him back through influence and gain, and later by subjugation and threats. Warrants with extradition demands against him were pressed by the French ambassador on Prime Minister Nehru, who deputed Sri C Rajagopalachari, then the chief minister of Madras (now Tamil Nadu) to look into the case. Rajaji met Ramanayya in the Cuddalore collector's rest house and. after taking his full statement, approved his actions and promised his support. A few days later, along with Naicker and Advocate Sri Perumal, Ramanayya met Nehru in Bangalore in the presence of Sri Sheikh Abdullah and the chief minister KC Reddy of Mysore, and submitted to him a memorandum requesting his help.

When no visible action was taken by the Indian government against Ramanayya and other nationalist parties in French settlements, the French cabinet petitioned the UNO over violations of the referendum agreement, such as allowing "gangs" to operate against the "peaceful French citizens". The UNO, in turn, deputed a board of observers consisting of Holgar Anderson of the Netherlands, Baron Rodolfo Castro of Spain, Montieor Perreard of Switzerland, Mr Chan of the Philippines, and Mr Krabbe of Denmark to visit the French settlements and give a full report to the International Court of Justice.

The observers arrived in Pondicherry in March 1951. On 19 April, in a traveler's bungalow on the frontier, Ramanayya was summoned for a meeting with them, which he attended with proofs and reports of pro-French crimes against Indian nationalists. A month after the observers' departure from Pondicherry, the press published the report they submitted to the international court of justice. It detailed the pro-French atmosphere prevalent at that time in the French settlements, and concluded that in those circumstances a fair and impartial referendum was not possible.

Despite the damaging report, the pro-French parties continued pushing for a referendum. On 29 August 1952, gunmen fired at Naicker while he was in his house. He escaped after receiving two bullet wounds to his left thigh; four or five bullets had struck the wall of his room. He refused to lodge a complaint with the French police or to be treated in a French hospital at Pondicherry. He was taken instead to the General Hospital Madras. The local French government made no arrests. All of the Indian leaders, in particular Nehru, condemned the attempted murder in very strong words.

On 10 October 1952, the Prime Minister of India, addressing a mass public meeting on the Island grounds in Madras, referred to the episode, stating that "even a respected leader in Pondicherry, only a few days ago, was badly attacked and came to the general hospital in Madras. What has the French government in Pondicherry done about it? Nothing. I believe that they arrested someone and later released him. Now, am I to understand that there is no government left in Pondicherry and only goondaism rules there?".

On the same day, Naicker, Dr. Ambrose, Advocate Perumal, Sri Srikanta Ramanujam, Advocate Xavery, Sri I K Kumaran, Sri Baradan and Ramanayya met Nehru in the Rajbhavan, Madras, with all the top leaders of Madras also present. Nehru called upon the Tamil Nadu Congress leaders to extend all material help to the refugees of Pondicherry who were under Ramanayya's care. Sri Raghunandan Saran, Managing Partner of the Ashok Leyland Automobile Factory of Ennore, Madras, extended great help to the refugees and provided for their maintenance. He also introduced Ramanayya to Sri Lal Bahadur Shastri, for whom they shared great respect.

About 10 December 1953, Consul General R.K. Tandon was transferred and Sri Kewal Singh took his place. He stood behind Naicker and Ramanayya. He was able to sway pro-French leaders and members of the assembly away from the French camp. A provisional government, with Edouard Goubert as the head, was formed in the enclave of Nettapacom. The Indian Armed Reserve was posted around its borders.

Negotiations continued between the two governments in Delhi and Paris. Singh met all of the leaders of the Provisional Government at a conference in Kandamangalam on the night of 11 April 1954. He explained that the French authorities were making fun of the petty provisional government of Nettapacom. He suggested that if the leaders wanted real liberation of all settlements they should occupy any of the big four settlements. While dropping Ramanayya at his home after the meeting, Singh asked him what he thought of the plan and if he had any ideas. Subsequently, a plan for Ramanayya to try to liberate Yanam was formed.

== Struggle for creation of a pro-merger atmosphere in Yanam ==
On 13 April 1954, Ramanayya arrived in Yanam for working out a possibility of its independence from the French. On arrival he realised that Yanam was dominated by a pro-French atmosphere and hence, there were no living nationalism signs. On 14 April 1954, he proceeded to Kakinada, a border town to Yanam in the East Godavari District of Andhra Pradesh State in India, where he met all of the district leaders and officials for help and aid. He did not find any encouraging responses from them.

Likewise, in Yanam, his handful of friends and relatives warned him that he would be captured and killed if he began nationalist agitation there. Everybody in Yanam seemed to have stood behind the French administration. The following day, when Ramanayya stepped in to meet some of his followers in Farampeta village, he was ambushed by the French police. He pulled out his revolver, fired in the air, and escaped over a nearby flood bank. He then hastily retreated to the Indian territory.

Returning to Kakinada he purchased a large number of Indian National Congress flags and started a house-to-house campaign, requesting students and their leaders to organise a meeting in the town hall grounds. He and his new nationalistic recruits hired lorries bedecked with Congress flags and loads of people to tour in the streets of Yanam, inviting them to the meetings. Once the meetings were organised, he urged the people to help him in his struggle for liberation of Yanam and incited patriotism in their young minds. Within a few days he was able to create an anti-French atmosphere in all surroundings.

Then the French police committed a blunder. They raided some of the villages on Indian territory. Ramanayya sent a telegram to Singh complaining about the high handedness of the French police. He installed loudspeakers around Yanam, played patriotic songs and explained to people the reasons for merger with India. Inside Yanam, the pro-French leaders organised daily meetings and processions against the merger and normally ended them with effigies being burnt.

In the beginning of June, the secretary general of the French administration from Pondicherry met Ramanayya and informed him that the government were transferring the two European officials who were residing in Yanam. He requested safety of these officials from the nationalist volunteers while leaving the place. Ramanayya followed the two officials to Kakinada, where they departed by train to Pondicherry.

== Liberation of Yanam ==
Now with all white French leaders out of fear of any mob fury, the merger leaders decided it was time to strike. Ramanayya made the required arrangements to take the administration of Yanam after consultation with the officials of Kakinada and other local Yanam leaders, including Sri Maddimsetti Satyanandam and Kamichetty Sri Parasurama Varaprasada Rao Naidu.

In the early morning on Sunday, 13 June 1954, Ramanayya marched at the head of a few thousand volunteers from Kakinada towards the bungalow of the administrator of Yanam, in order to capture it and hoist the Indian Flag. Bayankar Achary, another famous Indian revolutionary and patriot, was also a member of the volunteer corps. Marching 50 yards ahead of his volunteers with a megaphone, he requested the French police and other officials to cooperate and surrender. The French police retaliated and threw a few grenades which fell 20 meters from Ramanayya and exploded harmlessly. Then they started firing on the volunteers. The volunteers sheltered behind the Manyam Zamindar's choultry and fired many rounds against the French police who were in the open in front of the police station. About four policemen were wounded and fell. The remaining policemen stopped firing and ran away to lock themselves inside the police building, fearing mob fury. Ramanayya surrounded them and had them disarmed. The volunteers combed the town and arrested all the pro-French leaders and conducted a court martial against them. When they admitted to their guilt, clemency was shown to them. The coup d'état of Yanam was announced by All India Radio and Press.

== Return to civil life and last days ==
The Yanam coup d'état had enraged the French authorities of Pondicherry. Rumours were spread to the effect that the French government was despatching a cruiser to Yanam to capture merger leaders and to re-establish their authority. Towards the end of June 1954, Singh paid a visit to Yanam and requested his return to Pondicherry to continue his activities there.

On 3 July, on Singh's request, Ramanayya left Yanam, after making all arrangements for its proper administration. Once in Pondicherry, he began agitating alongside the followers of Sri V Subbiah, Clemencedu Goubert, and Venkata Subbareddiar throughout the territory. One day when Ramanayya was returning with a hundred volunteers from the Bahour commune towards Cuddalore he was ambushed and fired at by a dozen French troops. He was then at the rear of a column of volunteers. A volunteer beside him was shot dead and another was wounded.

In October, the Government of France agreed to the de facto transfer of power to India after holding a nominal vote of members of the Assembly and the municipal members. Edouard Goubert, also a trusted friend of Ramanayya, had played the most important role in these elections. The de facto transfer of power took place on 1 November 1954. Nehru visited Pondicherry on 16 January 1955. Ramanayya, Goubert, S. Perumal, and Sri Pakirisamy Pillai presented addresses to Nehru in a public meeting in the maidan of Gorimedu.

After the French left India, Ramanayya wanted to leave politics, which he always despised, and was anxious to settle in his home state of Andhra Pradesh and to provide his children with education in his native regional language of Telugu. For his sacrifices to the nation and from intervention of the central cabinet, he was resettled as a high-ranking officer in the then excise department of the state of Andhra Pradesh from where he has finally retired on 29 June 1963. he led a peaceful farming life until his death on 5 May 1991.

He was interred alongside his wife Subadramma and other family members and near the grave of Father Gangloff in the Catholic cemetery of Jagannaickpur, Kakinada, Andhra Pradesh. In 1993, he was honored by the Pondicherry Government, who gave him a befitting salute by installing a lifesize bronze statue in the Yanam town square near the regional administrator building and the Catholic Church. His family, consisting of six sons and two daughters, settled themselves in Kakinada, London and Chicago and did not show any interest in politics or administrative affairs and went out of public eye.

== See also ==
- Municipal Administration in French India
- Coup d'État de Yanaon
- Colonial History of Yanam
- Kamichetty Sri Parasurama Varaprasada Rao Naidu
- Inde française
