= Goubert =

Goubert is a surname. Notable people with the surname include:

- Édouard Goubert (1894–1979), Indian mayor
- Joseph Goubert (1908–?), French field hockey player
- Pierre Goubert (1915–2012), French historian
- Stéphane Goubert (born 1970), French cyclist

== See also ==
- Gobert
