= Ordre du Nichan El-Anouar =

French order of merit

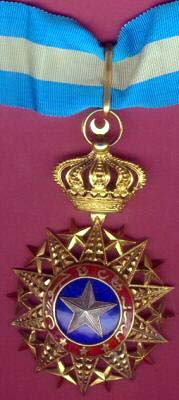
- Type: Order with five degrees: Grand-Croix (Grand-Cross); Grand-Officier (Grand-Officer); Commandeur (Commander); Officier (Officer); Chevalier (Knight)
- Presented by: France
- Status: Deprecated 3 December 1963 by the Ordre National du Mérite
- Established: October 1887

Precedence
- Next (higher): Médaille militaire
- Equivalent: Ordre National du Mérite
- Next (lower): Croix de guerre

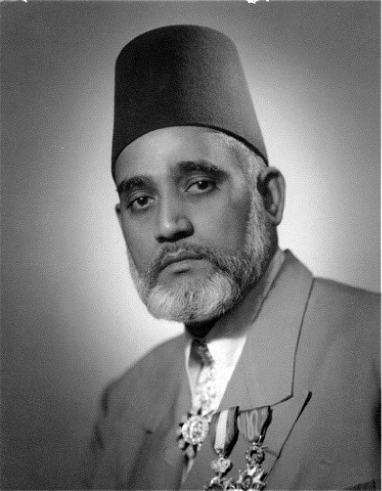
JM Abdul Aziz (centre medal)

The Ordre du Nichan El-Anouar (Arabic: Order of the Light) was established in 1887 as a colonial order of merit of the Tadjourah Sultanate in French Somaliland and abolished as a result of the order reform on 3 December 1963.

== History ==
On 21 September 1884, the Tajourah sultanate was declared a protectorate of France with subordination to the French governor of Obok. In October 1887, Sultan Hamed bin Mohammed established the Order of Nishan-el-Anuar. The new order was approved by the Governor of Obok, Leonce Lagarde, on the condition that the award will be made with his permission. On 17 July 1888, the establishment of the order was approved by the French government, with its transfer to the jurisdiction of the Governor of Obok.

According to decree dated 10 May 1896, the Order of Nishan-el-Anouar was declared a colonial award of France. The administration of the Order's affairs was entrusted to the Office of the Legion of Honor, in the image of which the Order of Nichan-El-Anouar was structured.

By decree of 1 September 1950, the order received the status of an award of Overseas France.

The Order of Nichan-El-Anouar was abolished by decree of 3 December 1963, which established the National Order of Merit, replacing numerous departmental orders.

Those awarded the Order of Nichan-El-Anouar retained the right to wear the badges of the Order even after its abolition.

== Terms of awarding ==
From 1896 to 1933, the Order of Nichan-El-Anouar could be awarded to persons who had served for at least 3 years in the territories of French Somaliland and Central Africa or who had other services to the French Colonial Empire.

Since 1934, the order could be awarded to persons at least 29 years old and having at least 9 years of military or civil service experience or other professional activity, including a double or triple period of stay in the territories of the colonies.

The award ceremony was held once a year — on 14 July.

== Notable recipients ==
- François Doumenge
- Louis Faidherbe
- Henri Gouraud
- H.M.Cassime (H.Mouhamad Cassime, Past Mayor and President of Chambre de Commerce of Pondicherry)
- JM Abdul Aziz of Saigon and South India.

== Bibliography ==
- Marc Champenois (9 August 2008). "Ordre du Nichan el-Anouar". Les décorations Francaises (in French). Archived from the original on 2008-08-27.
