= François Doumenge =

François André Jean Marie Doumenge
- Born: 9 October 1926 (age 99); Viane, Tarn
- Died: 14 July 2008 (aged 81); Nice, France
- Occupation: Marine geographer

François André Jean Marie Doumenge (9 October 1926 – 14 July 2008) was a French geographer who specialized in marine and island geography. His work focused on oceanography, the socio-economics of tuna fisheries, fisheries and Japanese aquaculture, and the evolution of the archipelagos of Melanesia, Polynesia and Micronesia.

== Biography ==
François André Jean Marie Doumenge was born in Viane, Tarn on 9 October 1926. Between 1946 and 1950 he studied at Montpellier, Aix, earning bachelor's degrees in Geography and Law. In 1966 he was given a State Doctorate of Arts (Geography). François Doumenge began his academic career at the Paul Valéry University, Montpellier III, in the Department of Geography.

1948–1953: Certified Professor, Paulhan College
1953–1957: Associate Professor, Lycee Montpellier
1957–1961: Assistant, Faculty of Arts, Montpellier
1961–1966: Assistant Professor, Faculty of Letters, Montpellier
1966–1967: Lecturer, Faculty of Arts, Montpellier
1967–1968: Lecturer, Universities of Abidjan and Montpellier
1968–1979: Chair Professor of Geography and tropical Oceanography
1979–1988: Professor of the Chair of ethology and animal species Conservation, National Museum of Natural History

During his academic career, he held other positions:

1967–1970: Director of the Institute of Tropical Geography at the University of Abidjan, Ivory Coast
1971–1973: Project leader for the FAO – UNDP to the Agency for fisheries development in the South Pacific Islands

As planning assistant for Municipality of Montpellier from 1959 until 1977, he launched creation of the Polygône center under the mandate of François Delmas. As deputy mayor of Montpellier, François Doumenge was given the project of creating a zoo, the "parc zoologique de Lunaret", which opened its doors in 1964. The design had large enclosures separated from the public by deep ditches, with no cages or fences, so the animals could live in a more natural environment.

He was rector of the Academy of the West Indies and French Guiana from 1976 to 1979.

In June 1979 he was elected a professor at the National Museum of Natural History, to the chair of ethology and conservation of animal species. This position included giving direction to the Paris Zoological Park and the Ménagerie du Jardin des Plantes in Paris, the Haute Touche Zoological Park in Obterre and the Cleres Zoological Park in Clères. He also directed four the zoos run by the National Museum of Natural History (1979–1988) and the Oceanographic Museum of Monaco (1988–2001). He was made professor emeritus of the National Museum of Natural History.

President of ORSTOM, now the Institute of Development Research, between 1986 and 1988. He was also in 1988 made Secretary General of the International Commission for the Scientific Exploration of the Mediterranean. From 1991 he was the titular commissioner for Monaco to the International Whaling Commission. Between 1991 and 1994 he was also chairman of the Committee on Ecology of the International Union for Conservation of Nature.

== Awards ==
- Officer of the Legion of Honour, 1993.
- Knight of National Order of Merit (France), 1974.
- Ordre des Palmes Académiques, 1978.
- Ordre du Mérite Maritime, 1995.
- Ordre du Nichan El-Anouar, 1961.
- Order of Saint-Charles, Monaco, 1993.
- Order of the Rising Sun, Japan, 1997.

== Publications ==
- Le Japon et l'Exploitation de la mer, Société Languedocienne de Géographie, Montpellier, 1961.
- Géographie des mers, Presses universitaires de France, 1965.
- L'homme dans le Pacifique Sud (étude géographique), Musée de l'Homme, 1966.
- Actualités de la pêche et de l'aquaculture japonaises, Société Languedocienne de Géographie, Montpellier, 1975.
- Les Antilles françaises, Presses universitaires de France, 1989, rééd. 1993.
- L'Histoire des pêches thonières, ICCAT, Madrid, 1996.
- La pêche en Méditerranée, Cahiers du CERM, Tome 2, 2000.
