= Kamisetty Parasuram Naidu =

Indian politician (1921–1989)

Member of French India Representative Assembly
- In office 1946–1951
- Preceded by: Position created
- Succeeded by: Canacala Tataya
- Constituency: Yanam

Member of Pondicherry Representative Assembly
- In office 1955 – 30 June 1963
- Preceded by: Position created
- Succeeded by: Position abolished
- Constituency: Yanam

Deputy Speaker of Pondicherry Legislative Assembly
- In office 27 November 1963 – 24 August 1964
- Preceded by: Position created
- Succeeded by: Vanmeri Nadeyi Purushothaman
- In office 5 April 1972 – 2 January 1974
- Preceded by: M.L.Selvaradjou
- Succeeded by: None (Note: Fourth Assembly of Pondicherry didn't have any deputy speaker)

Speaker of Puducherry Legislative Assembly
- In office 27 March 1985 – 19 January 1989
- Preceded by: M.O.H. Farook
- Succeeded by: M. Chandirakasu

Member of Pondicherry Legislative Assembly
- In office 1 July 1963 – 19 January 1989
- Preceded by: Position created
- Succeeded by: Raksha Harikrishna
- Constituency: Yanam

Personal details
- Born: Kamichetty Sri Parassourama Varaprasada Rao Naidu; 2 October 1921 Yanaon, French India
- Died: 19 January 1989 (aged 67)
- Party: Congress
- Spouse: Kamichetty Savithri
- Children: 1 son and 2 daughters

Kamisetty Sri Parasurama Varaprasada Rao Naidu (2 October 1921 – 19 January 1989), popularly known Kamisetty Parasuram Naidu, was an Indian politician who served as the Speaker of Puducherry legislative assembly from 1985 to 1989. He also served as its first Deputy Speaker from 1963 to 1964 and later in another term from 1972 to 1974 He was a member of the legislative assembly (MLA) of Puducherry from 1964 until his death in 1989. A government high school in Yanam was named after him.

== Birth and family ==
He was born in a Kapu family in Yanam as the son of Former Maire de Yanaon, Kamisetty Venugopala Rao Naidu and Kamalamma. He married Kamisetty Savithri of Badeti family hailing from Eluru. He was an undisputed leader until his death in Yanam after his father.

== Member of representative assembly ==
He was a member of the representative assembly of Pondicherry between 1946 and 1964 by winning elections in 1946, 1955 and 1959. However, in 1951 elections he lost to Canacala Tataya.

== Member of legislative assembly ==
He was never defeated throughout his political career. He held the constituency as his pocket borough without facing any challenge in winning the seat consecutively in 1964 (INC), 1969 (IND), 1974 (IND), 1977 (JP), 1980 (IND) and in 1985 (INC). As long as he was alive he contested without break from the first elections held in 1964 as per the Representation of People Act for the territorial Assembly after de jure merger of Puducherry with India.

He contested most of the time as an Independent and was deputy speaker twice. Kamichetty became 10th Speaker of Puducherry Legislative Assembly after his elections in 1985. He died in office on 19 January 1989. He was the longest-serving Member of the Legislative Assembly (MLA) in the history of the Puducherry Legislative Assembly until 1989.

== Titles held ==
Preceded by N.A.	Membre de l'assemblée réprésentative de Yanaon; 1946 – 1951	Succeeded by Canacala Tataya
Preceded by Canacala Tataya	Membre de l'assemblée réprésentative de Yanaon; 1955 – 1964	Succeeded by defunct
Preceded by Kamichetty Savithri	MLA of Yanam; 1964–19 January 1989	Succeeded by Raksha Harikrishna
Preceded by Post created	Deputy Speaker of Puducherry; 27 November 1963–24 August 1964	Succeeded by V. N. Purushothaman
Preceded by M.L.Selvaradjou	Deputy Speaker of Puducherry; 5 April 1972 –2 January 1974	Succeeded by President's rule
Preceded by M.O.H. Farook	Speaker of Puducherry; 27 March 1985 –19 January 1989	Succeeded by M. Chandirakasu

== See also ==
- Puducherry Legislative Assembly
- Pondicherry Representative Assembly
- 1946 French India Representative Assembly election
- 1955 Pondicherry Representative Assembly election
- 1959 Pondicherry Representative Assembly election
- 1964 Pondicherry Legislative Assembly election
- 1969 Pondicherry Legislative Assembly election
- List of speakers of the Puducherry Legislative Assembly
- Bouloussou Soubramaniam Sastroulou
- Samatam Krouschnaya
