= French India Students Congress =

Student movement in French India

The French India Students Congress was a student movement in French India, which fought for independence of the colony from French rule. The foundation of the French India Students Congress was preceded by the formation of the French India National Congress. The French India Student Congress was affiliated with the All India Student Congress.

The founding of the French India Students Congress came after the disbanding of the Saraswathi Sangam. The organization was formed at the Ansari Café, in Pondicherry, on 17 August 1946, with the purpose of mobilizing the youth of the colony for independence. Its founders included Antoine Vallabh Mariadassou, Sebastien, Dorai Mounissamy, Arumugam, J. Savarinathan, T.N. Sethuraman (Thirumudi.N.Sethuraman) and Ambadi Narayan (from Mahé). Antoine Vallabh Mariadassou was the founding president of the organization, serving 1946–1947. Paul Radjanedassou served as president 1947–1948 and Shatrugh Paramel 1948–1949. Dorai Mounissamy was the founding general secretary of the organization. The organization used slogans such as Down with French colonialism!, Inquilab Zindabad!, Jai Hind! and French, Quit India!.

As independence of British India drew nearer, the French India Students Congress called for a protest on 9 August 1947 to call on France to quit India. French authorities issues a ban against the manifestation. The ban provoked spontaneous protests from the French India Students Congress, the French India National Congress, the Communist Party of French India and trade unions. The protests forced the French authorities to withdraw the ban. The mass rally of the French India National Congress and French India Students Congress was held on 10 August 1947 a meeting was held at Nehru Vanam. It was presided by Rajan Das from the Students Congress. The meeting called for immediate merger of French India with India.

In November 1947 the French India Students Congress began publishing Jeunesse. The editorial office was located on rue Candappa, at the residence of Paul Radjanedassou and Antoine Mariadassou.

Ahead of the October 1948 municipal elections, the French authorities launched a crack-down on the French India Students Congress. S. Paramel and D. Mounissamy (editor of Jeunesse) were arrested and jailed for shorter periods.

The French India Students Congress took part in the mass protests against French colonial rule in 1954. D. Mounissamy held a protest on 14 April 1954, which was attacked by police and goondas.
