= Lambert Saravane =

Deputy
- In office 2 June 1946 – 27 November 1946

Deputy
- In office 10 November 1946 – 4 July 1951

Personal details
- Born: 17 September 1907; Rettiarpaleom, Ozhukarai, Puducherry
- Died: 18 February 1979; Paris, France

Lambert Saravane (1907-1979) was a deputy in the National Assembly of France between 2 June 1946 and 4 July 1951.

He was born on 17 September 1907 at Rettiarpaleom in Ozhukarai, in the territory of Puducherry, then part of French India; and died on 18 February 1979 at Paris, in France. Saravane was elected under the banner of the Democratic and Socialist Union of the Resistance (UDSR) group of René Pléven and François Mitterrand. Elected in 1946 with the support of the National Democratic Front, he joined Édouard Goubert in July 1947 to found the anti-merger French India Socialist Party, then shifted towards anticolonialism a year later, even before the October 1948 municipal elections and in 1951 he was beaten by Goubert with 149 to 90,053 votes at the legislative election. In the following years, heading a new, moderate, Parti républicain, he became openly a pro-merger activist. He left the political scene after the merger and taught at the French Pondicherry College.
