= Gobert =

Gobert is a surname. Notable people with the surname include:

- André Gobert (1890–1951), French tennis player
- Anthony Gobert (1975–2024), Australian motorcycle road racer
- Émile Joseph Isidore Gobert (1838–1922), French entomologist
- Jacques-Nicolas Gobert (1760–1808), French general
- Jos Gobert (1922–unknown), Belgian chess master
- Pierre Gobert (1662–1744), French painter
- Rudy Gobert (born 1992), French basketball player
- Thomas Gobert (c. 1630 or 1640–c. 1708), French architect and engineer
