= Samatam Kistaya =

Mayor and pro-French leader

Maire de Yanaon
- In office April 1954 – 13 June 1954
- Preceded by: Madimchetty Satianandam
- Succeeded by: Maddimsetti Satianandam
- Constituency: Yanaon (Inde française)

Conseiller Municipal
- In office June 1951 – 13 June 1954
- Constituency: Pydicondala, Yanaon

Personal details
- Born: 1870s Yanaon, Inde française
- Died: 13 June 1954 Yanaon, Inde française (Coup d'État de Yanaon)
- He was killed during Coup d'État de Yanaon

Monsieur Samatam Krishnayya (Samatam Kistaya) (Yanam c. 1875 – 13 June 1954) was a poet, historian and ayurvedic doctor. He wrote many books in Telugu. He was a loyal pro-French politician.

== Life ==
During 1954, Monsieur Maddimsetti fled from Yanam to join pro-merger group, which brought anger in its people that led to pillage of his home. Then a 78-year-old, Monsieur Samatam Krouschnaya became the Mayor of Yanam (interim) who was the lone pro-French leader to fight against pro-merger leaders.

== Death ==
He died during the Coup d'État de Yanaon on Sunday, 13 June 1954 at the age of 78 years. It was declared that he was killed by Indian Military while seizing Yanam. But it is still a mystery about the actual causes and real persons behind his death.

== Major view about his death ==
On the day of the coup, he fought a lone battle to maintain French sovereignty in Yanam against all the pro-merger groups. When he was trying to jump from a wall (at Pydikondala house) and take shelter, he was shot by Maddimchetty Satianandam who had a pistol which had been given to him by one of his close friends. It was known that Maddimchetty thought that because of Monsieur Samatam that only his house had been pillaged. The 78-year-old, Acting Mayor Monsieur Samatam collapsed mortally wounded, but even as he was dying he did not stop shouting Vive la France.

== French patriot ==
The French Government identified him as a patriot of France with Citation à l’Ordre de la Nation on 19 November 1954.

== Titles held ==
Preceded by ?	Membre du Conseil Municipal de Yanaon; June 1951–13 June 1954	Succeeded by defunct (Coup d'État de Yanaon)
Preceded by Maddimsetti Satianandam	Maire de Yanaon (Acting); April 1954–13 June 1954	Succeeded by Maddimsetti Satianandam (Coup d'État de Yanaon)

== See also ==
- Yanam, French India
- Dadala Rafael Ramanayya
- Diwan Bouloussou Soubramaniam Sastroulou
- Kamichetty Sri Parassourama Varaprassada Rao Naidu
