= Representative Assembly of French India =

Representative Assembly of French India Assemblée représentative de l'Inde française

Type
- Type: Unicameral
- Term limits: 5 years

History
- Founded: 1946
- Disbanded: 1955
- Preceded by: French India General Council (Conseil général de l'Inde française)
- Succeeded by: Pondicherry Representative Assembly
- Seats: 44 (25 December 1946 – 1 May 1951); 39 (1 May 1951 – 11 Jun 1955)

Elections
- Voting system: First-past-the-post
- First election: 1946
- Last election: 1951

Meeting place
- Pondichéry

In 1946, French India (Inde française) became Overseas territory (Territoire d'outre-mer) of France. Then, in the same year on 25 October, the Representative Assembly of French India (Assemblée représentative de l'Inde française) of 44 members has been created that replaced the general council (conseil général) of 30 members.

== Formation ==
During the start of Fourth Republic, by decree nº 46–2381, dated 25 October 1946, passed by the Government of France instituted a Representative Assembly in the French India. People of both genders have been allowed to vote. This assembly had 44 seats in total. A member of this assembly was referred as Councillor. The seat of the representative assembly is assigned at Pondichéry and the tenure is fixed to be 5 years.

== Commune-wise allocation of seats ==
French India consisted of five establishments, namely, Pondichéry, Chandernagore, Karikal, Mahé and Yanaon. The allocation of 44 seats of the Assemblée Représentative of French India for the 17 communes of French India. Établissements de Pondichéry and Karikal had eight and six electoral constituencies (circonscription électorales), respectively. While, Chandernagore, Mahé and Yanaon had one electoral constituency, respectively.

As per Article 2 of the decree, the composition of the assembly is determined as below

- Établissement de Pondichéry (Establishment of Pudducherry)(total 22 seats)
  - Pondichéry: 6
  - Ariancoupom: 2
  - Bahour: 2
  - Modéliarpeth: 2
  - Oulgaret: 4
  - Nettapacom: 2
  - Tiroubouvané: 2
  - Villenour: 2
- Établissement de Karikal (Establishment of Karaikal) (total 12 seats)
  - Karaikal Ville: 4
  - Cotchéry: 2
  - Grand'Aldée: 2
  - Neravy: 1
  - Nédouncadou: 1
  - Tirnoular: 2
- Établissement de Chandernagore (Establishment of Chandranagar)(total 5 seats)
  - Centre-ville
  - Nord-est
  - Nord-ouest
  - Sud-ouest
  - Sud-est
- Établissement de Mahé (Establishment of Mahé) (total 3 seats)
  - Mahé: 3
- Établissement de Yanaon (Establishment of Yanam)(total 2 seats)
  - Yanaon: 2

== List of Seats ==
Constituencies of French India Representative Assembly
Settlements (Établissements)	Seats (sièges)	Constituencies (circonscriptions)
Pondicherry	22	Pondicherry (6): Mouttalpeth, Couroussoucoupom, Cassicade, Pondicherry, Bussy Street, Ouppalam; Ariancoupom (3): Archivak–Ariancoupom, Tavalacoupom; Bahour (2): Bahour, Courouvinatam–Karaiamputtur; Modéliarpeth (2): Mouroungapacom, Nellitope; Oulgaret (4): Oulgaret, Calapeth, Saram–Lawspet, Rettiarpaleom; Nettapacom (2): Nettapacom, Embalam; Tiroubouvané (2): Sellipet–Suthukeni, Mannadipet; Villenour (2): Villenour, Oussoudou
Karikal	12	Cotchery (2): Cotchery-Mada Kovil, Thirumeniyazhagar; Karikal (4): Karikal Nord, Karikal Centre, Karikal Sud, Karaikovilpattu; Tirnoular (2): Tirnoular-Tharparinswarar Kovil, Tirounalar-Padhrakaliamman Kovil; Neravy (1): Neravy; Neduncadou (1): Neduncadou; Grand Aldée (2): Grand Aldée-Nord, Grand Aldée-Sud
Mahe	3	Mahé (3):Mahé (Ville), Pallor, Pandakkal
Yanaon	2	Yanaon (2):Cancalapeth, Adi Andhrapeth
Chandernagore	5	Ville (1): Part of Ourdibazar Lalbagan, Bagbazar Hattekola; Nord-est (1): Boro and Part of Sarisapara, Bibirhatte and Part of Kholchiny; Nord-ouest (1): Naroua, Horidradanga, Part of Bibirhatte and Part of Kholchiny; Sud-ouest (1): Jouguipoucour, Haldarpara, Part of Kholchiny and part of Barasette; Sud-est (1): Gondolpara, Dinomardanga and Goretty

== Functioning of the assembly ==
This Assembly met twice in ordinary sessions of 30 days duration and twice in extraordinary sessions of 15 days. It was called either by the Governor or by two-thirds of the members, if necessary on the prerequisite. The President of the Assembly was selected on the basis of seniority by age. The Assembly was permitted to deliberate and give its opinion on matters referred to it. The Governor or head of the French Indian administration assured the implementation of the decisions or opinions of the Assembly. The budget prepared by the Governor and his council was discussed and it was implemented by his order. In fact the Assembly and the Governor shared the initiative of incurring state expenditure. In short, the Assembly was nothing more than an approving body as the Head of French India was endowed with the power of overriding the decision or opinion of the Assembly. In reality, it could not take up or discuss matters which were not submitted before it, and from that point of view its scope was very restricted.

== Impact of Chandernagore merger into Indian Union ==
Chandernagore has been merged into Indian Union by a referendum held on 19 June 1949, where its people overwhelmingly voted for merger with India. The de facto transfer of Chandernagore to the Indian Union took place on 2 May 1950. This changed the strength of the representative assembly to 39 seats.

== 1946 French India Representative Assembly election ==
The first election to the Representative Assembly was held on 15 December 1946. The election was won by the National Democratic Front of Deiva Zivarattinam, that won 30 out of 44 seats. The assembly session first met on 6 January 1947. As of June 1959, the president of the assembly (equivalent to speaker in Indian assemblies) was M. Balasubramanian and the Finance minister was Karunendra Mudaliar.

== 1951 French India Representative Assembly election ==
The second election to the Representative Assembly was held on 16 December 1951.

== Impact of merger of French India into Indian Union ==
The de facto transfer of French settlements in India has happened on 1 November 1954. These four French settlements were organized as State of Pondicherry.

== Dissolution ==
On 11 June 1955, The Government of India has dissolved the Representative Assembly of the State of Pondicherry via State of Pondicherry (Representative Assembly Decree Amendment) Order. Later, Pondicherry Representative Assembly has been created that functioned until 1964. After the de facto merger and before the legal integration (i.e. de jure transfer) with the Indian Union on 16 August 1962, general elections to the assembly were held in 1955 and 1959. The French settlements in India were de jure transferred on 16 August 1962.

== See also ==
- Pondicherry Representative Assembly
- Puducherry Legislative Assembly
- Municipal Administration in French India
- List of consuls general of India in the French India
- French colonial empire
- French India
