= Kanakalapeta =

Coordinates: 16.734°N 82.194°E

Kanakalapeta is a revenue village in the Yanam District of Puducherry, India.
