= Malladi Krishna Rao =

Indian politician

Minister for Health, Tourism, Irrigation, Civil Aviation, Sports & Fisheries, Arts & Culture
- In office 2016-2021

Member of the Puducherry Legislative Assembly
- In office 9 May 1996 — 2 May 2021
- Constituency: Yanam

Personal details
- Born: 6 June 1964 (age 62) Darialathippa village, Yanam, Pondicherry, India.
- Party: All India N.R. Congress (2021- present)
- Other political affiliations: Indian National Congress (till 2021)
- Spouse: Udaya Lakshmi Malladi

Malladi Krishna Rao (born 6 June 1964) is a politician from Yanam, Puducherry and a MLA.

== Early life ==
Malladi Krishna Rao was born on 6 June 1964 in Darialathippa Village, in the Yanam district in India. He was born in an Agnikula Kshatriya Community and went to school up to 12th Grade.

== Political career ==
Malladi Krishna Rao was elected as a member of the Indian National Congress for Yanam in 1996. He held this post until 2021. He acted as Minister of Tourism, Local Administration, Civil Aviation, Rural Development, District & Rural Development in May 2006 and acted as Minister of Revenue, Excise, Fisheries, Tourism, Civil Aviation and Sports & Youth Services in 2008 in the Cabinet of Puducherry. In 2021 he was appointed Special Representative to the Government of Puducherry.

== Positions ==
- 1996 - 2000 : Member of Legislative Assembly, Yanam
- 1997 - 2000 : Housing Board Chairman, U.T of Pondicherry
- 2000 - 2001 : Tourism and Transport Chairman, U.T of Pondicherry
- 1997 - Till Date : Founder & Chairman for Yanam Old Age Home, Yanam
- 2001 - 2006 : Member of Legislative Assembly, Yanam
- 2002 - Till Date : Founder & Chairman for Yanam Peoples' Voluntary Service Organisation, Yanam
- 2006 - 2011 : Revenue Minister, Govt. of Puducherry.
- 2008 - Till Date : Founder & Chairman for Yanam Blood Bank, Yanam
- 2008 - Till Date : Founder & Chairman for Yanam Eye Bank, Yanam
- 2009 - Till Date : Founder & Chairman for Yanam Chinnarula Ananda Nilayam (Orphanage), Yanam
- 2011 - 2016: Member of Legislative Assembly, Yanam
- 2016 - 2021 : Health Minister, Govt. of Puducherry
- 2026 – : Member of Legislative Assembly, Yanam
