= Mannadipattu =

Mannadipattu Mannadipet
- Commune
- Location in Puducherry, India Mannadipattu (India)
- Coordinates: 11.984248°N 79.632082°E
- Country: India
- State: Puducherry
- District: Puducherry

Population (2001)
  - Total: 25,473

Languages
  - Official: French, Tamil, English
- Time zone: UTC+5:30 (IST)
- PIN: 605 501
- Telephone code: 0413
- Vehicle registration: PY-05-V
- Sex ratio: 50% ♂/♀

Mannadipattu is a Village, Commune and Assembly Constituency in the Union Territory of Puducherry, India. It consists of 3 enclaves out of the 11 enclaves of Puducherry. Also, Sellipattu, located on the main enclave, is a part of Mannadipattu Commune. Mannadipattu, along with Nettapakkam Commune, forms the western border to the Union Territory.

== History ==
Suttukeni had been active in trade with Rome via Arikamedu Port in the 2nd century BCE. It is located 7 km from Mannadipattu.

The Main Objective of Tribuvane Commune(renamed after Liberation as Mannadipet Commune) in the French Independence Movement

When Puducherry was under the control of the French India Government, Tribuvane Commune (in English/Tamil: Thirubuvanai Commune/ திருபுவனை கொம்யூன்) was one of the eight communes of Puducherry.

After the conquest of Tribuvane Commune, the rules and decisions of the "Temporary Government", which had been formed by the revolutionary committee with the support of the people who had occupied the Commune after 6 April 1954, were not formally announced and communicated to the French India Government.The name 'Tribuvane Commune' came from all French records till 5 April 1954. Thus, the rules and decisions taken by the 'Temporary Government' after the capture of Tribuvane Commune after 6 April 1954 are not regulated by the French India Government. Therefore, in all French records, the term "Tribuvane Commune", the name changed to the name of the conquest and the ruler's name was not formally declared to the French Government. In the liberation struggle movement an interim Liberation Government set up after the conquest of the Tribuvane Commune by the Commune revolutionary party from the French Government has renamed it as the "Mannadipet Commune" after request of the public on 6 April 1954. Thus, from 6 April 1954 till today, the name "Tribuvane Commune" is called as "Mannadipet Commune". But at the same time, French Government records have been misinterpreted in the agreement made between French India Government and the Union of India as the Tribuvane Commune, and the Puducherry region is connected to the Indian Union.

Proud of ending the French India Government's rule for nearly three and a half centuries, headquartered on the east coast of India, Tribuvane Commune, an integral part of French Puducherry, was captured in the Liberation Struggle..

The role of Tribuvane Communes' in the French independence movement is a unique one.

The culmination of the anti-French struggle was decided by Narayanasamy S/o. Sankara Gounder (25 November 1920 – 17 February 1997) farmer and Tribuvane Commune farmers Association President, who was head of the anti-French Communist Party leader of the Commune, to seize the police station. Accordingly, the decision was made by the revolutionary Communist Party to seize the police station. On 5 April 1954 at around 11.00 PM, the police station was besieged by a heavily armed revolutionary group. On 6 April 1954 until early morning the next day at the police station in the crossfire, the French Guards and Police officers were chased.

The French Police Station was brought under the full control of the revolutionary command of the trio led by S. Narayanasamy. The French flag flew over the Police Station was down and set on fire. The name board of the Police Station, which had been hanging in the front of the French police Station, was later demolished and then burned. Dawn on 6 April 1954 the first Indian national Tri-colour flag was hoisted by the leader who led the revolutionary council S. Narayanasamy on the Tribuvane French Police Station.

After the Police Station was seized and brought in their full control, more than a thousand guns, bullets and explosives were seized in the Armed Room of the Police station. This news spread to the villages around the Tribuvane police station, which was captured by the revolutionary group of three. (The French police station, captured by the three-armed action revolution, was demolished and in the same place new Police Station at Tribuvane was opened on 2 June 1984 and is currently working) Consequently, other volunteers from the Communist Party and the public, along with the revolutionary Communist party, escorted French officials from the French office across the district to go out of the Commune.

After bringing the entire Commune under their full control, Narayanasamy announced that the revolutionary committee had been released the entire Commune freed from the French. Further, he arranged to put "dandora" (way of communication method used in villages to communicate messages) to the public that the revolutionary group was captured all over the areas of the Commune containing 22 villages and Tribuvane Commune was declared free from the French.

On the orders of the revolutionary group leader, the French flag hoisted on French Government buildings were lowered and burnt down in the entire Commune.

A special advisory meeting of the general public was organized to take public opinion, to provide the Interim Government with the support of other parties like merger congress and socialist, to protect the people and to lead the commune captured by the revolutionary group from the French.

For this the grand command was arranged to receive public accreditation. Then, according to the decision of the revolutionary party leader S. Narayanasamy French Puducherry State Communist Party Leader V. Subbiah has been brought into the Tribuvane Commune on 10 April 1954. In his presence and in front of 23,000 villagers assembled in front of Tribuvane Commune Panchayat Office the first Indian National Tri-colour flag was hoisted by S. Narayanasamy. After this an "Interim Liberation Government" was created with the head of Tribuvane. Then the decision was taken to build a three-member cabinet to administer the interim state was decided.

The daily news paper of New York Times published on 12 April 1954 writes this historically significant event that "a pro-Indian temporary government" has been constituted in the detached Tribuvane commune from Frenchman's governance.

As stated above, before the general public meeting a three-member Ministry with bureaucratic responsibilities were sworn. In which S. Narayanasamy was sworn and took assumption of charge as Executive Minister with portfolio in the Ministry.

Some of the resolutions were passed at this meeting. S. Narayanasamy, who was elected as the Executive Minister and given power to make some important steps and to take an arbitrary decision in this meeting, was handed over by the cabinet.

Below are some of the resolutions passed by the cabinet at the public meeting in order to protect civilians, prevent French authorities from entering the seized Commune.

(1) The "Declaration of Independence" was made by the 22 villages under Tribuvane Commune and the removal of the French regime. (2) It was announced that the French authorities or French guards enter into the Commune were banned. (3) People living within 22 villages with an extent of 23.54 square miles under the Tribuvane Commune were not required to pay any tax to the French India Government. (4) The French guards, Police Officers were once again unable to enter Tribuvane Commune, and the gunmen were forced to stop at the border. The decision was made to train young people to this. The decision was made to arrange gun shoot training for young people by gunfire captured at the Tribuvane French Police Station. The guards were ordered to work in the shift to carry the guns for 24 hours. And they were paid monthly salary. (5) It was announced that the Tribuvane French Police Station would be renamed "People's Security Council". (6) The renamed People's Security Council would serve as the security headquarters of the liberated Commune. (7) The decision to set up a checkpoint with gun guards in the inner roads from 22 rural villages of the Commune in order to prevent the riots from entering the area captured by the strangers. (8) Moreover, it was decided that the shift-based gun safety aid security guard would be guarded with 24 hours within 22 villages within the commune, in order to confuse and disperse the people. (9) It was reported that the civilian intruders or outsiders would be allowed to be tested on the checkpoints by means of the roadways. (10) A few items were banned for bringing them outside and similarly banned for some materials for bringing into the Commune. (11) The French guards and police officers were allowed to enter the Liberation Tribuvane Commune only after receiving the permission of the Cabinet. (12) According to the request of the majority of the people, the name of Tribuvane Commune was renamed as "Mannadipet Commune" and later the changes were made in the capture Commune records. (13) It was announced that the cabinet with a three-member ministry would be running under the name 'Mannadipet Government'. (14) It was announced that the Commune Panchayat Building was functioning as an office for the state of Mannadipet. (The building was built by the Frenchmen who were functioning as a Puducherry state government office and is now functioning as the “Mannadipet Commune Panchayat” office after Puducherry is connected to the Indian Union by French India Government) (15) People have been told that they can light their grievances and inform the Mannadipet Government. (16) The rule implemented by the French India Government and all the legal schemes were seized and renamed and operated on the grounds that they did not control the Mannadipet Government and that all were expired on 5 April 1954 and the order was issued.

Many more resolutions were brought by the three-member cabinet of Mannadipet Government, and they were soon absorbed.

== Demographics ==
As of 2001 India census, Mannadipattu had a population of 25,473. Males constitute 50% of the population and females 50%. Bahour has an average literacy rate of 81.49%, male literacy is 88.89%, and female literacy is 74.13%. In Bahour, 10% of the population is under 6 years of age.

== Geography ==
Mannadipattu is 24 km from Puducherry city. It is connected with Puducherry by Puducherry-Thirukkanur (via Mannadipattu) Bus Route.

== Road Network ==
Two RC Roads passes through Mannadipattu. They are

- Frontier Road (RC-21)
- Mannadipattu–Thirukkanur Road (RC-32)

In fact, Frontier road ends at Mannadipattu.

== Places of interest ==
=== Chandrasekharar Temple, Thiruvakkarai ===
Chandrasekharar Temple, Thiruvakkarai is located at 5 km from Mannadipattu. This temple is praised by Saint Sambandar in Thevaraam.

=== National Fossil Park, Thiruvakkarai ===
National Fossil Park, Thiruvakkarai is the first fossil park in India. It is maintained by the Geological Survey of India. The wood fossils are spread over 247 acres in nine separate enclaves around Thiruvakkarai.
