= Bezawada Bapanayya Naidu =

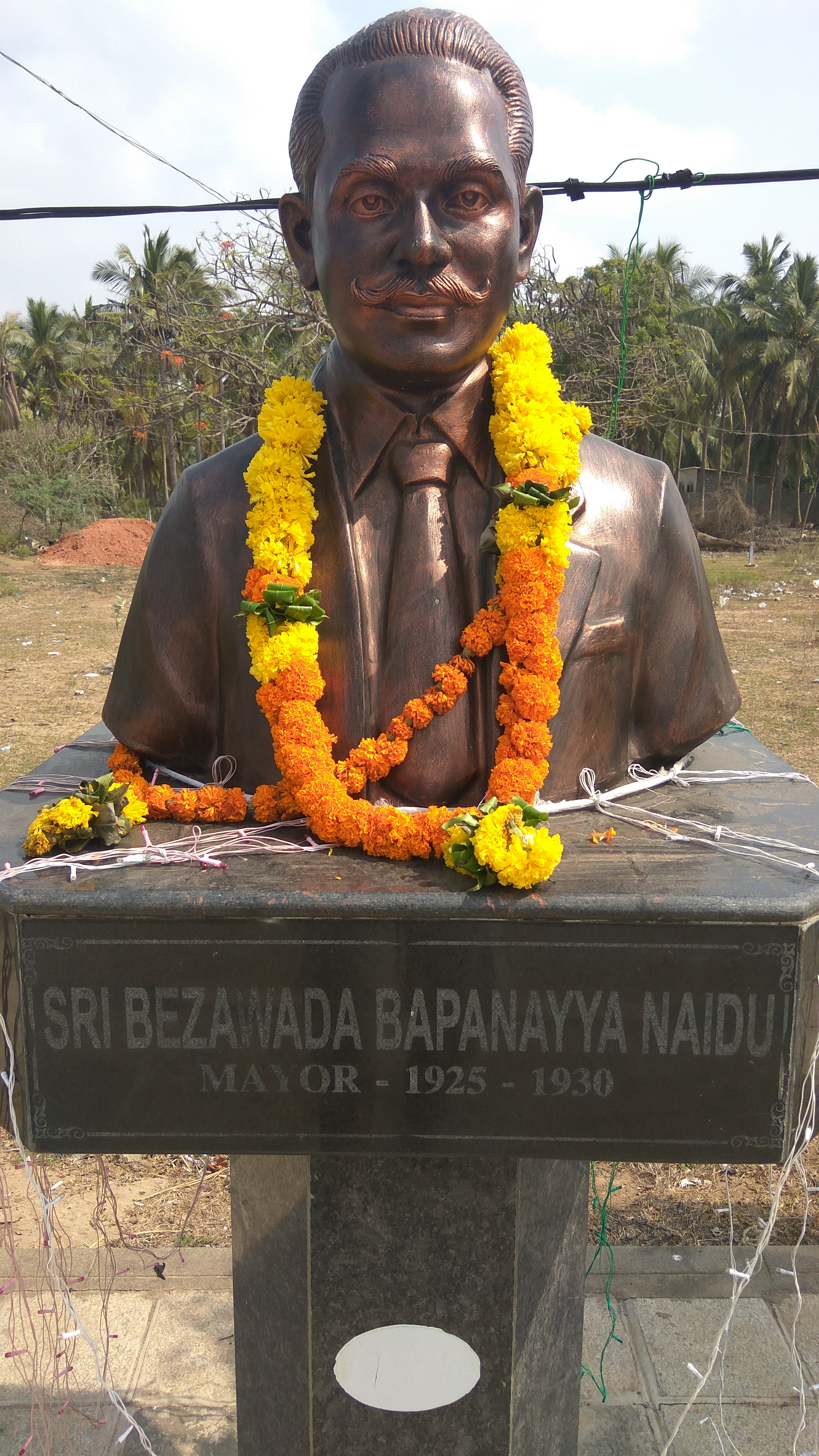
Mayor of Yanam, 1925 to 1930.

Bezawada Bapanayya Naidu Jr was the Mayor of Yanam from 1925 to 1930.

== Titles held ==
- Membre du Conseil Municipal de Yanaon
- Membre du Conseil Local de Yanaon
- Maire de Yanaon

== See also ==
- Yanam Municipality
- Colonial History of Yanam
- Municipal Administration in French India
