= Karaikal Municipality =

Municipality in Puducherry, India

Coordinates: 10.932701°N 79.831853°E

Type
- Type: Municipality of the Karaikal

Website
- karaikal.gov.in

Karaikal Municipality is a municipality in the union territory Puducherry, India. It serves the area covered by the town of Karaikal, located in Karaikal taluk of Karaikal district.

== History ==
Municipalité de Karikal (Karaikal Municipality) was created by a French Metropolitan Decree dated 12 March 1880. This municipality had 12 seats (Sièges). Citizens from each ward elected one representative for them for "Conseil Municipal de Karaikal" (Karaikal Municipal Council). The term of the office was six years.

The Karaikal Municipality is acting according to the Pondicherry Municipalities Act 1973 which has been introduced by the Government with effect from 26 January 1974. The Municipality is functioning under the purview of Municipal Council. In the absence of elected local body, the Special Officer (Regional Administrator) was appointed by the Government to exercise all the powers and functions of the Municipal Council. Commissioner who has also been appointed by the Government is the Chief Executive of the Municipality and he also acts as Registrar of Births and Deaths of the Municipality. Over all control and supervision is by the Director, L.A.D., Pondicherry. He is also functioning as the Chief Registrar of the Births and Deaths in the Union Territory of Pondicherry. The Municipality is a separate entity of self Government institution with constitutional status.

As noted in 2011 census of India, along with the census town Thirumalairayanpattinam, the Karaikal municipality has formed a new urban agglomeration, Karaikal Urban Agglomeration. This is the 2nd urban agglomeration noted in the union territory of Puducherry, the first one being Puducherry Urban Agglomeration formed around the city of Pondicherry.
