= Deiva Zivarattinam =

Deiva Zivarattinam (born 3 December 1894, Pondicherry, d. 25 March 1975, Pondicherry) was an Indian politician. He represented Pondicherry (then a French colony) in the French Constituent Assembly election in 1945.

Zivarattinam studied law and became a lawyer. He was appointed to the provisional Constituent Assembly, that had been assembled by Charles de Gaulle in Algiers in November 1943. His mandate was validated on 13 January 1944. Zivarattinam was included in the Overseas Commission of the assembly. At the time, Zivarattinam's health was weak. On 7 November 1944 he moved to Paris to where the provisional Constituent Assembly had shifted. During the Paris sessions, he participated in Overseas Commission, Labour and Social Affairs Commission, Permanent Coordination Commission and the Muslim Affairs Commission.

In the 1945 French Constituent Assembly election, Zivarattinam stood as a candidate of the Social Democratic Union for the French India seat. He won the seat, having received 22,171 votes (46.8%). He sat in the Democratic and Socialist Resistance (RDS) group. In the assembly he was a member of the Overseas Commission and the Justice and General Legislation Commission. In the Overseas Commission (chaired by Lamine Guèye), he became one of the secretaries.

Zivarattinam lost his seat in the June 1946 elections, being defeated by Lambert Saravane. Zivarattinam received merely 18 votes.

Towards the end of French rule of Pondicherry, he led a political party called the Town Congress. The Town Congress favoured integration with India.
