= H. M. Cassime =

Indian businessman and mayor (1900–1986)

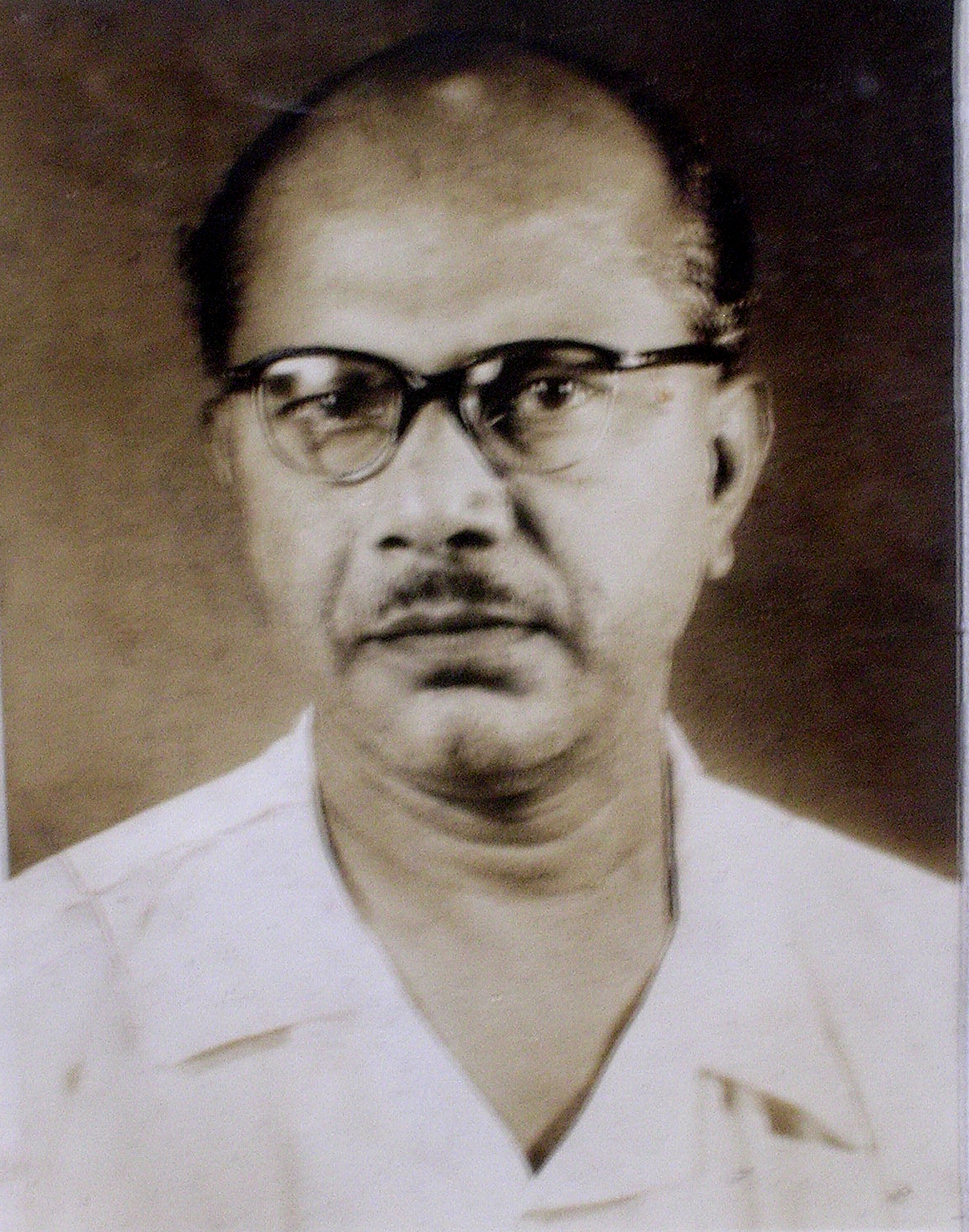
- Born: H. Mouhamad Cassime; 23 January 1900; Pondicherry, French India
- Died: 20 June 1986 (aged 86); Pondicherry, India
- Education: Lycée français de Pondichéry
- Occupations: Businessman, mayor
- Spouse(s): Oummaselma(1912–1945, Died); Hamidaby(1928–1987, Death)

H. M. Cassime (1900–1986; Tamil: எச்.எம்.காசிம், born Mohamed Cassime, Mouhamad Cassime or H. M. Kassim), was a Tamil-born businessman. He served as mayor of Pondicherry from 15 September 1956 to 3 November 1961, during the merger of Pondicherry from French India to the Republic of India.

== Early life ==
H. M.Cassime was born to Mouhamad Haniff (also spelt as Mohamed Haniff), and Mouhamadmoidinebiby. Cassime's eldest son, C. M. Achraff, born C. Mohamed Acharaff, was a Member of the Legislative Assembly of Pondicherry, winning 7 times in Assembly Elections from 1964 until his death in 1999. Achraff was a Deputy Mayor and a Minister of the Legislative Assembly of Pondicherry. Acharaff is one of 155 people from Pondicherry who was awarded the Tamrapatra.

== Political life ==
Cassime was a businessman who took part in politics during the French and Indian periods. He was one of the 14 important Politicians of French Pondicherry who openly sent Telegrams to the French Government emphasising the importance of ceding Pondicherry and the French Settlements in India to the Indian Union as the logical choice owing to the racial, geographical, historical, economic and cultural contacts and similarities that Pondicherry had with the rest of Indian Union. This gave impetus to the Freedom Movement of Pondicherry. He was one of the 178 signatories of the Khizhoor Referendum held in 1954 which led to the Cession of Pondicherry to India from the French. He was the Mayor of Pondicherry for periods before and after the De Facto transfer of Pondicherry. From 1966 until his death in 1986, he was the President of the Chambre de Commerce - Chamber of Commerce of Pondicherry.

== Posts ==
- 26 June 1946 to 27 October 1948 - Deputy Mayor
- 27 October 1948 to 30 March 1954 - Deputy Mayor
- 30 March 1954 to 22 October 1954 - Mayor
- 22 October 1954 to 18 November 1954 - President of the Municipal Committee
- 19 November 1954 to 10 August 1955 - Vice President of the Municipal Committee
- 10 August 1955 to 15 September 1956 - Deputy Mayor
- 15 September 1956 to 3 November 1961 - Mayor

== Recognition ==
- Ordre du Nichan el Anouar (Chevalier)
- Ordre de l'Étoile d'Anjouan (Chevalier)
- L'Ordre national du Merite - National Order of Merit (France) (1963).
- Street Ambour Salai (Quai d'Ambour) was renamed to H. M. Cassime Salai and also the small market in Pondicherry were renamed to Janab H. M. Kassim Angadi.
