= Yanam Municipality =

Indian municipality

Coordinates: 16.74077°N 82.21682°E

Type
- Type: Municipality of the Yanam

Leadership
- Municipal Commissioner: Gowri Saroja
- Municipal Chairman: Vacant since 2011
- Seats: 10

Elections
- Voting system: First Past the Post
- Last election: 2006

Meeting place
- Mairie, Yanam

Website
- yanam.gov.in

Yanam Municipality (Telugu:Yānāṃ purapālakasaṃghaṃ) was created by a French Metropolitan Decree dated 12 March 1880. Yanaon municipality had 12 seats. Citizens from each ward elect one representative for Yanam Municipal Council. The term of office is six years.

== General information ==
The Yanam Municipality is acting according to the Pondicherry Municipalities Act of 1973 which was introduced by the Government and in effect since 26-01-1974. The Municipality is functioning under the purview of the Municipal Council. In the absence of an elected local body, the Special Officer (Regional Administrator), appointed by the Government, is exercising all the powers and functions of the Municipal Council. The Commissioner, who has also been appointed by the Government, is the Chief Executive of the Municipality and also acts as the Registrar of Births and Deaths of the Municipality. Overall control and supervision is by the Director, L.A.D., Pondicherry. He also functions as the Chief Registrar of the Births and Deaths in the Union Territory of Pondicherry. The Municipality is a separate entity of self-government institution with constitutional status.

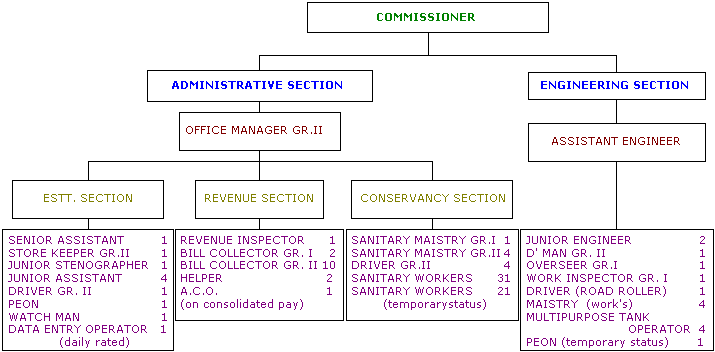
Organigramme of Yanam Municipality

== Notable people in French regime ==
- Bezawada Bapanaya Naidou, mayor
- Kamichetty Venougopala Rao Naidou, mayor
- Bouloussou Soubramaniam Sastroulou, politician
- Samatam Krishnayya, acting mayor

== Election results of 1948 ==
In June 1948 the French and Indian Governments came to an agreement as to how the future of the French Settlements should be determined.

Municipal elections were held in Pondicherry, Karaikal, and Yanam on 24 October 1948. The two main parties were the French India Socialist Party (Socialists), who favored the continuance of French rule, and the Indian National Congress Party, who favored union with India. In Yanam the Socialist party was led by Kamichetty Sri Parassourama Varaprassada Rao Naidu, a strong pro-French leader and later MLA of Yanam. The Congress party was represented by Yerra Jagannatha Rao. Among the Independents, Madimchetty Satianandam was elected as mayor and performed a key role in the merging of Yanam in India. Total Seats were 12, with 3 Socialists and 9 Independents.

== Wards of Yanam ==
There are 10 wards under yanam municipality

- Yanam Town
- Kanakalapeta
- Mettakur
- Farampeta (W)
- Giriyampeta (SC)
- Ambedkar Nagar (SC-W)
- Vishnalayam
- Pillaraya (W)
- Pydikondala
- Peddapudi (W)
- Aghraharam

== See also ==
- Municipal Administration in French India
- Pondicherry Municipality
- French Indies Company
- French colonial empire
- French India
- List of mayors of Yanam
