= National Democratic Front (French India) =

The National Democratic Front (French: Front national démocratique) was a political coalition in French India. The movement dominated the political scene in the colony for a brief period until the emergence of a split between the socialists and communists in the coalition.

The National Democratic Front was founded in January 1946. The front consisted of communists, socialists, the Mahajan Sabha and the Combat group (led by Julien Adiceam, who had arrived in French India from Algeria).

The National Democratic Front contested the 1946 municipal, Representative Assembly and French National Assembly elections. The 1946 election manifesto of the National Democratic Front called for French India to become a fully autonomous unit within the French Union. The National Democratic Front won 30 out of the 44 seats in the 1946 French India Representative Assembly election. Communist leader V. Subbiah was amongst the National Democratic Front candidates elected. In the June 23, 1946 municipal elections the National Democratic Front captured all 22 municipalities of French India, winning 101 out of 122 municipal seats up for election. Kamal Ghosh, a National Democratic Front leader, became mayor of Chandernagore. The candidate of the National Democratic Front, Lambert Saravane, won the French India seat in the November 1946 election to the French National Assembly.

In July 1947 Edouard Goubert and his followers broke away from the National Democratic Front and formed the French India Socialist Party. Goubert's new party quickly gained the support of the French colonial administration. What remained of the National Democratic Front became dominated by the Communist Party of French India.
