= French India Socialist Party =

French India Socialist Party Parti socialiste de l'Inde française
- Leader: Édouard Goubert
- Founded: July 1947
- Split from: National Democratic Front
- National affiliation: Democratic and Socialist Union of the Resistance
- Municipal council seats in Pondicherry district (1948): 102 / 102

The French India Socialist Party (French: Parti socialiste de l'Inde française) was a political party in French India. The party was led by Édouard Goubert, Minister for General Administration for French India. The party played a dominant role in the political life in the colony, being backed by the French administration. The party favoured retaining links with France, but would eventually turn against French rule.

== Founding ==
The party was founded in July 1947, after a split in the National Democratic Front. The Socialist Party was founded by Édouard Goubert, P. Counouma and Lambert Saravane, who left it shortly later. The party was able to gain strong support from anti-communist urban middle-class Pondycherrites, who were opposed to the Communist Party leader V. Subbiah.

== Role in Pondicherry politics ==
The new party quickly gained the support of the French colonial administration. Under Goubert's leadership, the French India Socialist Party avoided taking any clear position on the issue of merger with the Republic of India claiming that such a question was up to the people of the colony to decide.

The party fielded candidates for all of the 102 seats in the Pondicherry district for the August 1948 municipal polls. The elections were reportedly heavily rigged in Goubert's favour. All 102 French India Socialist Party candidates emerged victorious.

The pro-Merger parties boycotted the 16 December 1951 general and municipal polls, and thus the elections were easily won by the French India Socialist Party. Goubert continued as the Minister for General Administration.

== Turn towards Merger ==
Goubert had established a vast smuggling enterprise in Pondicherry, a fact that was well-known at the time. On 6 March 1954 French authorities charged Goubert with fiscal fraud. Other Socialist Party leaders were booked under corruption charges as well. Rapidly the relations between the colonial administration and the Socialist Party went sour. Politically, the French India Socialist Party made a sharp turn in its policy towards favouring a merger with India. The French authorities replied by stepping up the pressure on the party and its leaders. In some instances party members were attacked. Goubert and Mouttoupoulle (mayor of Pondicherry) went underground to evade capture. The party began planning to build a parallel administration in the peripheries of the Pondicherry district. The party was able to use its dominance of local communities, which had been established with French patronage, to mobilize resistance against French rule. The civil disobedience campaign of the Socialist Party (with support from other nationalist parties) was launched on 27 March 1954. The Socialist Party resistance campaign was crucial in destabilizing French control over the colony.

In May 1954, following the formation of the French India Liberation Council in Nettapakkam on 17 May, the party adopted the name French India Liberation Congress.

== Affiliations ==
The French India Socialist Party was affiliated with neither the Socialist Party of India nor the French Socialist Party (SFIO). During his parliamentary mandate, Goubert was attached to the Democratic and Socialist Union of the Resistance (UDSR) group of René Pléven and François Mitterrand, whereas Saravane had always stayed among the Indépendants d'outre-mer (Overseas Unaffiliated) parliamentary group. In Mahé there was a local Socialist Party, affiliated with the Socialist Party of India, with no links to Goubert's French India Socialist Party.
