= 1946 Madras Presidency Legislative Assembly election =

1946 Madras Presidency legislative assembly election
- 30 March 1946

All 215 seats in the Legislature of Madras State
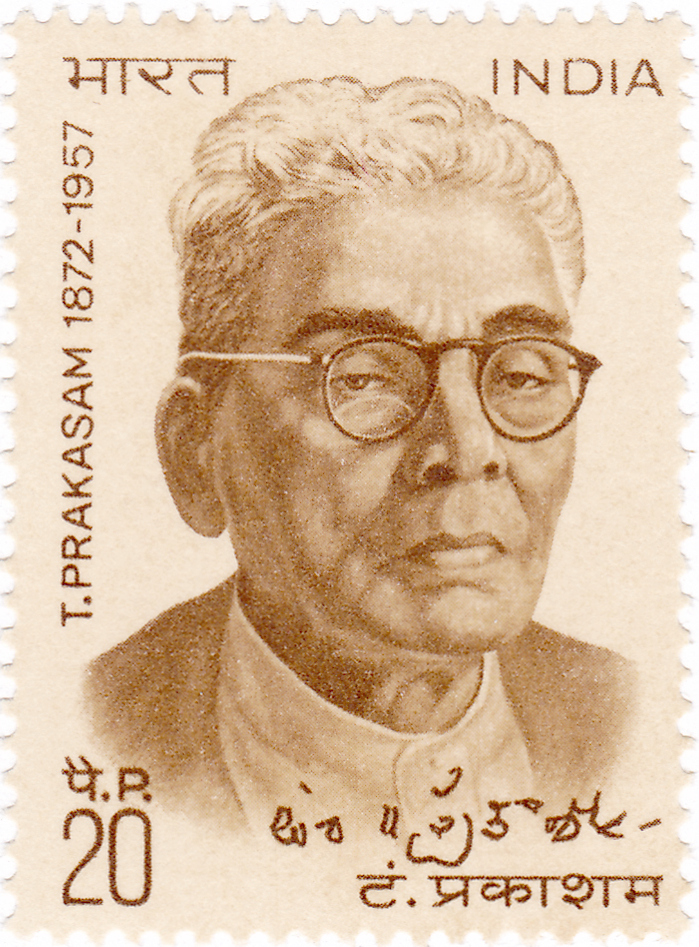

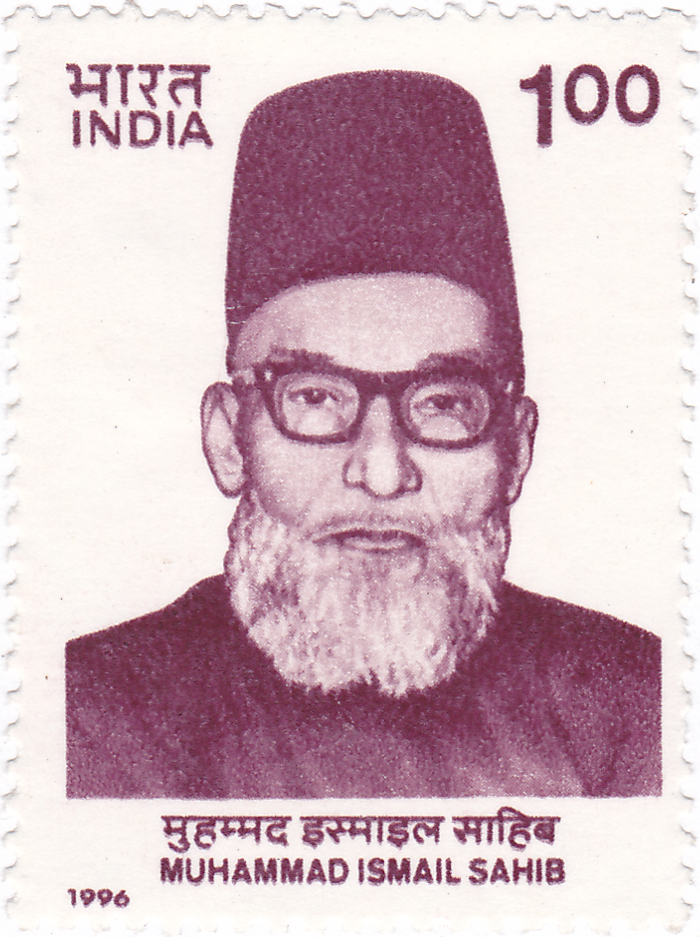
	First party	Second party
Leader	Tanguturi Prakasam	Muhammad Ismail
Party	INC	AIML
Seats won	163	28
Seat change	▲4	▲17
Percentage	75.81%	13.02%
Swing	▲1.86%	▲7.91%
Prime Minister before election
Governor's Rule
Elected Prime Minister
Tanguturi Prakasam
INC

The second legislative assembly election for the Madras Presidency after the establishment of a bicameral legislature by the Government of India Act of 1935 was held in 1946. The election was held after 6 years of Governor's rule starting from 1939, when the Indian National Congress government of C. Rajagopalachari resigned protesting Indian involvement in World War II. This was the last election held in the presidency - after Indian independence in 1947, the presidency became the Madras state. The election was held simultaneously with that of the Legislative Council. The Congress swept the polls by winning 163 out of 215 seats. The years after this election saw factionalism in Madras Congress party with divisions across regional (mainly Tamil and Andhra) and communal (Brahman and non-Brahman) lines. Competition among T. Prakasam (Andhra Brahman), C. Rajagopalachari (Tamil Brahman) and K. Kamaraj (Tamil non-Brahman) resulted in the election of Prakasam as the prime minister initially. But he was later defeated by Omandur Ramaswamy Reddiar (Tamil Nadu based ethnic Telugu non-Brahman) with Kamaraj's support. In turn, Reddiar himself was ousted to make way for P. S. Kumaraswamy Raja (Tamil non-Brahman) with the support of Kamaraj.

== Background ==
=== Governor's rule in Madras ===
The Congress government which had come to power in Madras Presidency in 1937 after winning the 1937 elections resigned in October 1939, protesting India's involvement in the Second World War. The Presidency came under the direct rule of the Governor on 30 October 1939, according to Section 93 of the Government of India Act of 1935. It was extended two times on 15 February 1943 and on 29 September 1945 by the proclamation of the Governor. The Labour government headed by Clement Attlee came to power in the United Kingdom in July 1945. It was more sympathetic to the cause of Indian Independence Movement. Indian viceroy Lord Wavell, proposed a plan to break the constitutional deadlock. Called the "Wavell plan", it resulted in the release of all Congress political prisoners and called for the repeal of Section 93 and for fresh elections to be held. The Congress agreed to resume its participation in the electoral process and elections were scheduled for 1946.

=== Rajaji-Kamaraj rivalry in the Congress ===
The years before the 1946 election saw a bitter struggle between C. Rajagopalachari (Rajaji) and K. Kamaraj for the leadership of Madras provincial Congress. Rajaji had quit the Congress on 15 July 1942 over differences with Congress leaders on issues related to Pakistan. After his departure, the Tamil Nadu Congress leadership was firmly in the hands of Kamaraj, who enjoyed enormous popularity in the Tamil region of the Madras Presidency. Rajaji re-entered Congress again in mid-1945. His return was much appreciated by Congress high command as they felt the Presidency needed his service greatly. Sathyamurthy was dead, Prakasam's popularity was confined to the Andhra region and Kamaraj was very young. Rajaji's claim to leadership found strong support in a Provincial Congress Committee meeting held in Tirupparankundram on 31 October 1945. To counter him, Kamaraj aligned himself with leaders like C. N. Muthuranga Mudaliar and M. Bhaktavatsalam. The Congress high command sent Asaf Ali to Madras in an effort to mediate between the pro- and anti-Rajaji factions. Kamaraj and Mudaliar wrote to the Congress high command protesting its interference in local politics and its preference of Rajaji. Sardar Vallabhbhai Patel felt it would be good for Rajaji to enter the Central Assembly. But Rajaji was interested in provincial politics and he wanted to contest from Madras University constituency. In summary, the Congress high command's contention that Madras Presidency Congress would be leaderless without Rajaji was not well received by Kamaraj and others and they were not willing to accept that it was acting purely in the interests of the province.

After visiting Madras to participate in the silver jubilee celebrations of the Dakshin Bharat Hindi Prachar Sabha (Institution for the propagation of Hindi in South India) during January 1946, Gandhi wrote an article in the Harijan supporting Rajaji's candidacy. The article titled "Curious" had a reference to a "clique" in Madras Congress against Rajaji. He concluded the article by saying,

Rajaji was by far the best man for the purpose in the Southern presidency, and, if I had the disposal in my hands, I would call Rajaji to office... But the disposal was with the Provincial Congree committee. My opinion was only that of an individual, to be taken for what it was worth.

The article led to a huge controversy in Madras province and Gandhi received several telegrams and letters condemning his article. Some even threatened to fast if he did not withdraw the word "clique". However, Gandhi did not relent and withdraw his comments. On 12 February 1946, Kamaraj resigned from the Tamil Nadu Congress Parliamentary Board. Displeased with the controversy, Rajaji withdrew from active politics. Patel, who had worked hard to strengthen Rajaji's image, was enraged by his abrupt withdrawal and said,

How could anybody support you, if you act like this? You do not even consult us, but that has always been your way of life. I can not understand you.

However he accepted Rajaji's withdrawal from the Madras University constituency. This was the third time Rajaji had retired from political life, the other two occasions being in 1923 and 1936. ḝ

=== Birth of Dravidar Kazhagam ===
The Justice party which had been the main political alternative to the Congress in the Presidency went into political wilderness following its defeat in the 1937 elections. During the Anti-Hindi agitations of 1937-40, it allied itself closely with Periyar E. V. Ramasamy and his Self-Respect Movement. Periyar eventually took over the Justice party's leadership on 29 December 1938. On 27 August 1944, it was renamed as Dravidar Kazhagam (DK). Under Periyar, the secessionist demand for Dravida Nadu became its main political plank. The DK boycotted the 1946 elections.

=== Participation of Communists ===
In 1942, the ban on the Communist Party of India (CPI), which had been in place since 1934, was lifted. Under the leadership of P. C. Joshi, the communists decided to contest the 1946 elections. They contested 103 of the 215 seats and winning two (Railway Trade Union constituency and West Godhavari-Krishna-Guntur non-Union Factory Labour constituency).

== Constituencies ==
The Government of India Act of 1935 had created a bicameral legislature in the Madras province. The legislature consisted of the governor and two legislative bodies – a legislative assembly and a legislative council. The assembly consisted of 215 members who were further classified into general seats and those reserved for special communities and interests:

General	Scheduled Castes	Mohammadans	Indian Christians	Women	Landholders	Commerce and Industry	Labour and Trade Unions	Europeans	Anglo Indians	University	Backward areas and tribes
116	30	28	8	8	6	6	6	3	2	1	1

The Act provided for a limited adult franchise based on property qualifications. Separate ballot boxes were kept for candidates of different political parties. The Congress was allotted the yellow coloured box, while the Muslim League and the Communist Party of India were allotted green and red coloured boxes respectively.

== Results ==
Party wise break up of seats after the 1946 election:

Party	Seats
Indian National Congress	163
All-India Muslim League	28
Independent party	7
Independents	6
Europeans	6
Communists	2
Not contested	2
Total	215

== Government formation ==
The election was concluded on 30 March 1946. A new government had to be formed before the Governor's rule lapsed on 29 April. The Congress, despite securing an overwhelming majority, was unable to agree upon a candidate for Prime Minister. Madras Presidency in 1946 was made of four linguistic regions - Tamil Nadu, Andhra, Mysore and Kerala and the Madras Congress Legislature Party (CLP) had four main factions. The factions were both regional - Tamil versus Andhra and Tamil versus Keralites and Karnataka members; and communal - Brahmin versus non-Brahmin. The largest faction was that of the sixty to seventy non-Brahman Tamil members headed by Tamil Nadu Congress Committee president Kamaraj. The remaining Tamil members were either uncommitted or supported Rajaji, who also had the support of P. Subbarayan. They called themselves as the Reform Group and numbered between twenty and thirty. The Andhra faction made up of 77 members, was further divided between the supporters of Prakasam and Bhogaraju Pattabhi Sitaramayya. There were also smaller Andhra factions of non-Brahmins from the Circars and non-Brahmins from the Rayalaseema. CLP also had eighteen members from Malabar and South Canara/Bellary.

=== Opposition to Rajaji ===
Mahatma Gandhi and the National Congress leadership supported the selection Rajaji as Prime Minister of Madras Presidency. This was against the Congress policy of not re-instating leaders who had opposed the Quit India Movement. Prakasam, Madhava Menon and Kamaraj, provincial presidents of Congress Committee in Andhra, Kerala and Tamil Nadu respectively were invited to New Delhi for negotiations. Despite Gandhi's intervention, Rajaji's election was defeated by 148 votes to 38.

=== T. Prakasam ===
Kamaraj and Kerala Pradesh Congress Committee President K. Madhava Menon supported C. N. Muthuranga Mudaliar for the post of prime minister and were opposed to Prakasam's candidacy. Rajaji and the Reform Group observed neutrality because of a prior agreement from 1937, which stipulated that the next Congress government would be headed by a member from Andhra. This led to the election of T. Prakasam by 82 votes to 69. Difference of opinion arose between Prakasam and Kamaraj over several issues including the inclusion of Madhava Menon in the cabinet. Kamaraj supported his inclusion and Prakasam supported Raghava Menon who belonged to the pro-Rajaji group. Dissatisfaction with Prakasam's textile mill policies and his slow implementation of prohibition, lead to his fall. Prakasam was voted out of power and submitted his resignation on 14 March 1947. The Reform Group allied with other opponents of Prakasam for his ouster.

=== T. Prakasam cabinet ===
Council of Ministers in T. Prakasam's cabinet (1 May 1946 – 23 March 1947)

Minister	Portfolio
T. Prakasam	Prime Minister, Public, Home, police, Food, and Finance
V. V. Giri	Industries, Labour, Electricity, Co-operation, Planning, and Forest
M. Bhaktavatsalam	Public Works, Irrigation, and Highways
T. S. Avinashilingam Chettiar	Education
K. T. Bashyam (Bashyam Iyengar)	Law, Courts, Prisons, and Legislature
P. S. Kumaraswami Raja	Development, Agriculture, Livestock and Fisheries
Daniel Thomas	Local administration
Rukmini Lakshmipathi	Public Health and Medical
K. R. Karanth	Land revenue
K. Koti Reddi	Hindu religious endowments, and Revenue (other than Land revenue)
Vemula Kurmayya	Public information
Bikkina Veeraswami	Forest, Cinchona, Fisheries, and Village industries (18 June 1946 - 03 Feb 1947)
R. Raghava Menon	House control, Motor transport, and Food
Bikkina Venkataratnam	Forest, Cinchona, Fisheries, and Village Industries (06 Feb 1947 - 23 March 1947)

Changes
Bikkina Veeraswamy's Resignation from Ministerial Post Due to Ill Health on 15 January 1947

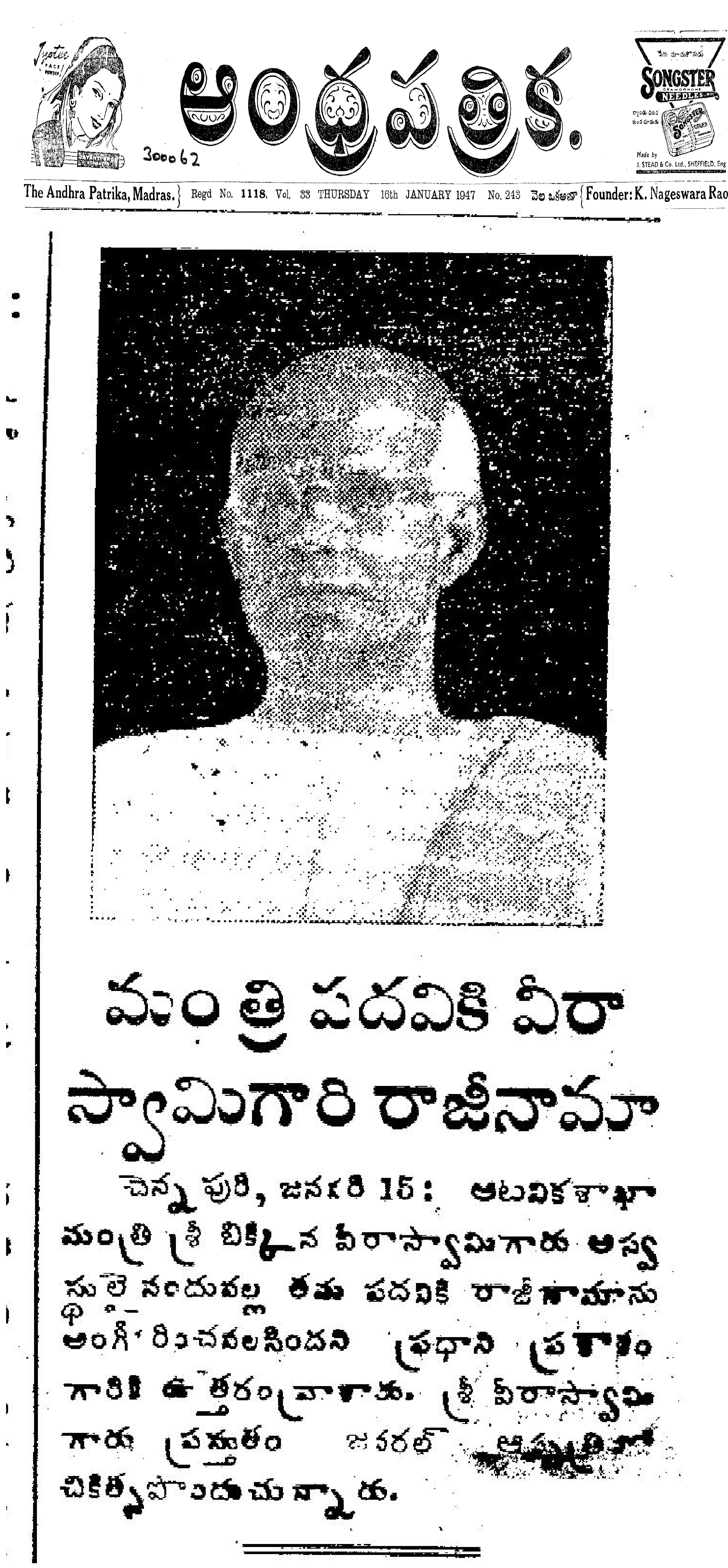
Bikkina Veeraswamy's Resignation from Ministerial Post Due to Ill Health - January 15, 1947

Forest Minister Bikkina Veeraswami submitted his resignation from the ministerial post. Citing ill health as the reason, he wrote to Prime Minister Prakasam, requesting the acceptance of his resignation. As he was undergoing treatment at General Hospital.

After that, he was replaced by Bikkina. Venkatarathanam as minister for Forest, Cinchona, Fisheries, and Village industries on 6 February.

Bikkina. Venkatarathanam

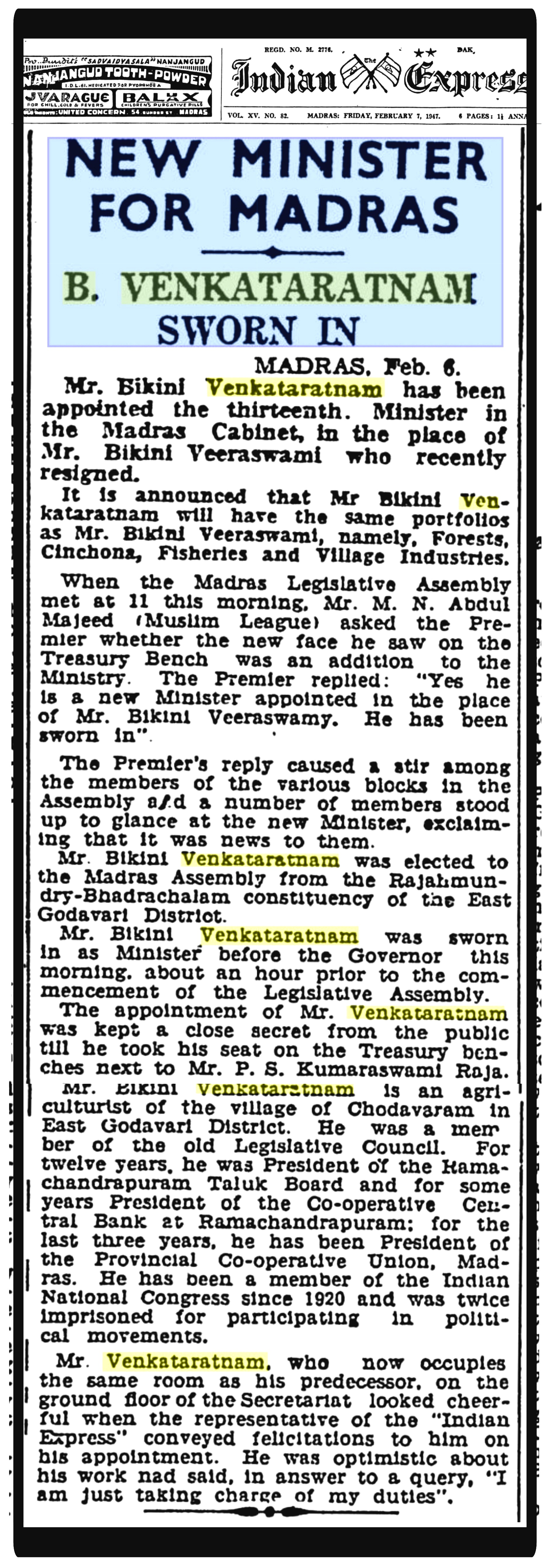

Bikkina Venkata Ratnam is the thirteenth Minister within the Madras Cabinet. He succeeded Bikkina Veeraswami, who resigned. Venkata Ratnam holds ministerial responsibilities for Forests, Cinchona, Fisheries, and Village Industries. His appointment surprised many members during the Madras Legislative Assembly session.

Hailing from the village of Chodavaram in the East Godavari District, Venkata Ratnam is an agriculturist. He has a long-standing political history, including membership in the old Legislative Council. He also served in leadership roles in various cooperative organizations. Venkata Ratnam has been an active member of the Indian National Congress since 1920 and has faced imprisonment twice for political involvement.

Venkataratnam's swearing-in ceremony took place before the Governor, and he then occupied the same office as his predecessor in the Secretariat.

=== Omandur Ramaswamy Reddiar ===
On 21 March 1947, Omandur Ramaswamy Reddiar was selected as the prime minister supported by Kamaraj and the anti-Prakasam factional alliance. In 1948, Prakasam sought re-election by contesting against Reddiar, who in addition to Kamaraj, was supported by other notable Andhra members such as N. Sanjeeva Reddy and Kala Venkata Rao. Prakasam was defeated by a vote of 112 to 84. Gradually Reddiar became dissatisfied with Kamaraj's interference in his administration. When he showed signs of independence, Kamaraj ousted him by vote of no confidence in the CLP on 31 March 1949.

=== Omandurar's cabinet ===
Council of Ministers in Omandur Ramasami Reddiar's cabinet (24 March 1947 – 6 April 1949)

Minister	Portfolio
Omandur Ramaswamy Reddiar	Prime Minister, Public, Hindu religious endowments and Harijan uplift
M. Bhaktavatsalam	Public works and Planning
P. Subbarayan	Home and Legal (Law and Order)
T. S. S. Rajan	Food, Motor transport and Labour
T. S. Avinashilingam Chettiar	Education
Daniel Thomas	Prohibition, Excise, Registration and Housing
Vemula Kurmayya	Harijan uplift, Fisheries and Rural development
H. Sitarama Reddi	Industries and Information
K. Chandramouli	Local administration and Co-operative
K. Madhava Menon	Agriculture and Forest
Kala Venkata Rao	Revenue
A. B. Shetty	Public health
S. Gurubatham	Khadi, Firka development and Cottage industries

Changes
Subbarayan resigned on 5 April 1948, Daniel Thomas on 15 June 1948 and Kala Venkata Rao on 24 January 1949.

=== P. S. Kumaraswamy Raja ===
P. S. Kumaraswamy Raja, the next Prime Minister who formed the Government on 6 April 1949 (as Chief Minister from 26 January 1950) was believed to be a stooge of Kamaraj. His election was opposed by P. Subbarayan, Rajaji and Prakasam. Kumaraswamy Raja ruled Madras till the 1952 election when he lost his seat in Srivilliputhur constituency.

==== Kumaraswamy Raja cabinet ====
Council of ministers in Kumaraswamy Raja cabinet (7 April 1949 – 9 April 1952)

Minister	Portfolio
P. S. Kumaraswami Raja	Public and Police
T. S. S. Rajan	Health, Religious Endowment and Resettlement of Ex-Service Personnel
M. Bhaktavatsalam	Public Works and Information
H. Sitarama Reddi	Land Revenue, Labour, Planning and Development
K. Chandramouli	Local Administration and Co-operation
Bezawada Gopala Reddy	Finance and Commercial Taxes
K. Madhava Menon	Education, Courts and Prisons
Kala Venkata Rao	Health
A. B. Shetty	Agriculture and Veterinary
B. Parameswaran	Firka Development, Khadi, Cottage Industries, Fisheries, Cinchona and Harijan Uplift
C. Perumalswami Reddiar	Industries, Mines and Minerals
J. L. P. Roche Victoria	Food and Fisheries
Neelam Sanjiva Reddy	Prohibition and Housing

Changes
Sanjiva Reddi resigned on 10 April 1951. Roche Victoria became minister on 2 June 1949 and Kala Venkata Rao on 26 September 1951. Some of the ministers resigned on 8 February 1952, when the results of 1952 election came out. Kumarasamy Raja, Rajan, Reddiar, Parameswaran, Sitarama Reddi, A. B. Shetty stayed on as a caretaker ministry till the next cabinet was formed on 10 April.

== Impact ==
The provincial legislatures formed by the 1946 elections elected the members (from their own members) to the Indian Constituent Assembly in December 1946. The Constituent Assembly drafted the Constitution of the Indian Republic and also served as India's first Parliament after India's independence on 15 August 1947. Since Congress had an overwhelming majority in both houses of the Madras legislature it was able to send a large number of its members to the Assembly.

List of Constituent Assembly members from Madras Presidency:

No	Name	Party	No	Name	Party
1	O. V. Alagesan	Congress	26	T. Prakasam	Congress
2	Ammu Swaminathan	Congress	27	Stanley Henry Prater	Anglo-Indian and Domiciled European Association
3	Madabhushi Ananthasayanam Ayyangar	Congress	28	Raja of Bobbili	
4	Moturi Satyanarayana	Congress	29	R. K. Shanmukham Chetty	Congress
5	Dakshayani Velayudhan	Congress	30	T. A. Ramalingam Chettiar	Congress
6	G. Durgabai	Congress	31	Ramnath Goenka	Congress
7	Kala Venkata Rao	Congress	32	O. P. Ramaswamy Reddiyar	Congress
8	N. Gopalaswami Ayyangar	Congress	33	N. G. Ranga	Congress
9	D. Govinda Das	Congress	34	Neelam Sanjiva Reddy	Congress
10	Jerome D'Souza	Congress	35	K. Santhanam	Congress
11	P. Kakkan	Congress	36	B. Shiva Rao	Congress
12	K. Kamaraj	Congress	37	Kallur Subba Rao	Congress
13	V. C. Kesava Rao	Congress	38	Ullal Srinivas Mallya	Congress
14	T. T. Krishnamachari	Congress	39	P. Subbarayan	Congress
15	Alladi Krishnaswamy Iyer	Congress	40	C. Subramaniam	Congress
16	L. Krishnaswami Bharathi	Congress	41	V. Subramaniam	Congress
17	P. Kunhiraman Nair	Congress	42	M. C. Veerabahu Pillai	Congress
18	M. Thirumala Rao	Congress	43	P. M. Velayudapani	Congress
19	V. I. Muniswamy Pillai	Congress	44	A. K. Menon	Congress
20	M. A. Muthiah Chettiar		45	T. J. M. Wilson	Congress
21	V. Nadimuthu Pillai	Congress	46	Muhammad Ismail	All-India Muslim League
22	S. Nagappa	Congress	47	K. T. M. Ahmed Ibrahim	All-India Muslim League
23	P. L. Narasimha Raju	Congress	48	Mahboob Ali Baig	All-India Muslim League
24	Bhogaraju Pattabhi Sitaramayya	Congress	49	B. Pocker	All-India Muslim League
25	C. Perumalswamy Reddiar	Congress			

== See also ==
- 1946 Madras Presidency legislative council election
