= 1946 Madras Presidency Legislative Council election =

1946 Madras Presidency legislative council election
- 30 March 1946

46 seats in the Madras Legislative Council 24 seats needed for a majority
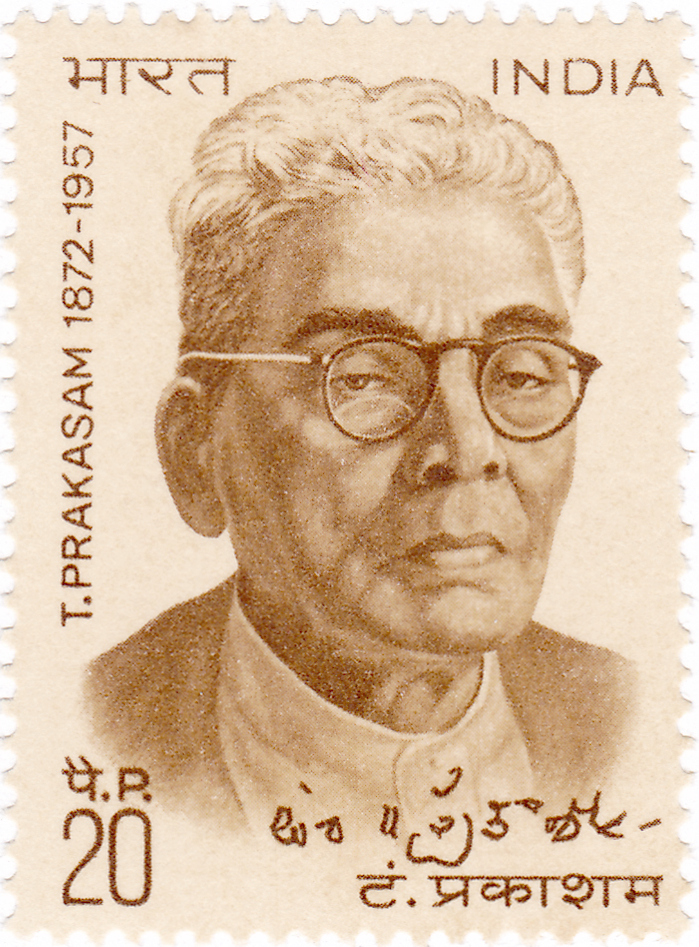

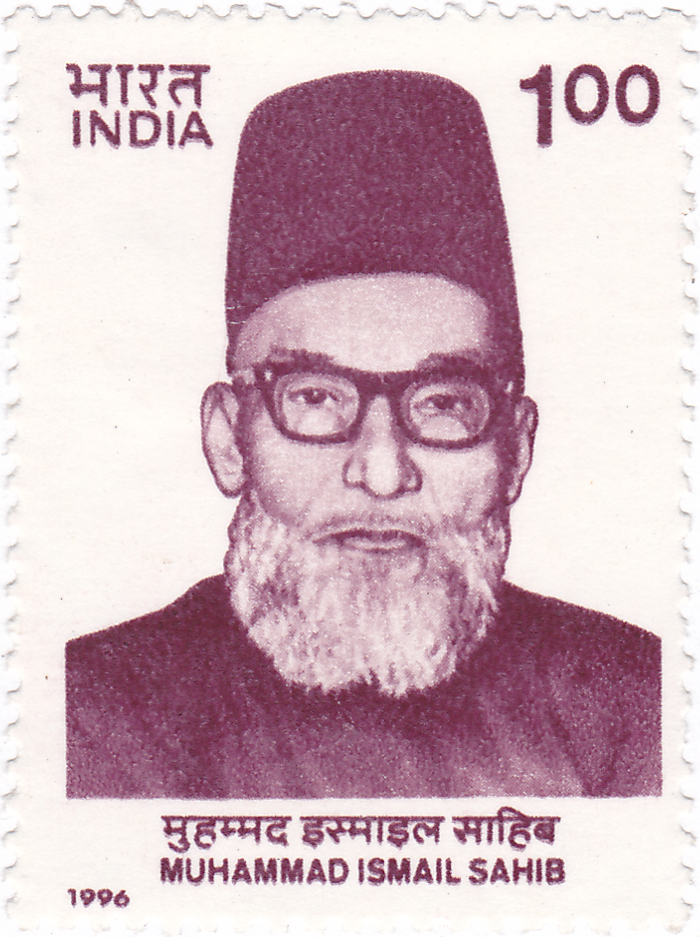
	First party	Second party
Leader	Tanguturi Prakasam	Muhammad Ismail
Party	INC	AIML
Seats won	32	7
Seat change	▲5	▲4
Percentage	69.57%	15.22%
Swing	▲10.87%	▲8.70%
Premier before election
Governor's Rule
Elected Premier
Tanguturi Prakasam
INC

The second legislative council election for the Madras Presidency after the establishment of a bicameral legislature by the Government of India Act of 1935 was held in March 1946. The election was held after 6 years of Governor's rule starting from 1939, when the Indian National Congress government of C. Rajagopalachari resigned protesting Indian involvement in World War II. This was the last direct election held for the Madras Legislative Council in the presidency - after Indian independence in 1947, the presidency became the Madras state and direct elections to the council were abolished. The election was held simultaneously with that of the Legislative Assembly. The Congress swept the polls by winning 32 out of 46 seats. The years after this election saw factionalism in Madras Congress party with divisions across regional (mainly Tamil and Andhra) and communal (Brahman and non-Brahman) lines. Competition among T. Prakasam (Andhra Brahman), C. Rajagopalachari (Tamil Brahman) and K. Kamaraj (Tamil non-Brahman) resulted in the election of Prakasam as the Premier initially. But he was later defeated by Omandur Ramaswamy Reddiar (Tamil non-Brahman) with Kamaraj's support. In turn, Reddiar himself was ousted to make way for P. S. Kumaraswamy Raja (Tamil non-Brahman) with the support of Kamaraj.

== Background ==
=== Governor's rule in Madras ===
The Congress government which had come to power in Madras Presidency in 1937 after winning the 1937 elections resigned in October 1939, protesting India's involvement in the Second World War. The Presidency came under the direct rule of the Governor on 30 October 1939, according to Section 93 of the Government of India Act of 1935. It was extended two times on 15 February 1943 and on 29 September 1945 by the proclamation of the Governor. The Labour government headed by Clement Attlee came to power in the United Kingdom in July 1945. It was more sympathetic to the cause of Indian Independence Movement. Indian viceroy Lord Wavell, proposed a plan to break the constitutional deadlock. Called the "Wavell plan", it resulted in the release of all Congress political prisoners and called for the repeal of Section 93 and for fresh elections to be held. The Congress agreed to resume its participation in the electoral process and elections were scheduled for 1946.

=== Rajaji-Kamaraj rivalry in the Congress ===
The years before the 1946 election saw a bitter struggle between C. Rajagopalachari (Rajaji) and K. Kamaraj for the leadership of Madras provincial Congress. Rajaji had quit the Congress on 15 July 1942 over differences with Congress leaders on issues related to Pakistan. After his departure, the Tamil Nadu Congress leadership was firmly in the hands of Kamaraj, who enjoyed enormous popularity in the Tamil region of the Madras Presidency. Rajaji re-entered Congress again in mid-1945. His return was much appreciated by Congress high command as they felt the Presidency needed his service greatly. Sathyamurthy was dead, Prakasam's popularity was confined to the Andhra region and Kamaraj was very young. Rajaji's claim to leadership found strong support in a Provincial Congress Committee meeting held in Tirupparankundram on 31 October 1945. To counter him, Kamaraj aligned himself with leaders like C. N. Muthuranga Mudaliar and M. Bhaktavatsalam. The Congress high command sent Asaf Ali to Madras in an effort to mediate between the pro- and anti-Rajaji factions. Kamaraj and Mudaliar wrote to the Congress high command protesting its interference in local politics and its preference of Rajaji. Sardar Vallabhbhai Patel felt it would be good for Rajaji to enter the Central Assembly. But Rajaji was interested in provincial politics and he wanted to contest from Madras University constituency. In summary, the Congress high command's contention that Madras Presidency Congress would be leaderless without Rajaji was not well received by Kamaraj and others and they were not willing to accept that it was acting purely in the interests of the province.

After visiting Madras to participate in the silver jubilee celebrations of the Dakshin Bharat Hindi Prachar Sabha (Institution for the propagation of Hindi in South India) during January 1946, Gandhi wrote an article in the Harijan supporting Rajaji's candidacy. The article titled "Curious" had a reference to a "clique" in Madras Congress against Rajaji. He concluded the article by saying,

Rajaji was by far the best man for the purpose in the Southern presidency, and, if I had the disposal in my hands, I would call Rajaji to office... But the disposal was with the Provincial Congree committee. My opinion was only that of an individual, to be taken for what it was worth.

The article led to a huge controversy in Madras province and Gandhi received several telegrams and letters condemning his article. Some even threatened to fast if he did not withdraw the word "clique". However, Gandhi did not relent and withdraw his comments. On 12 February 1946, Kamaraj resigned from the Tamil Nadu Congress Parliamentary Board. Displeased with the controversy, Rajaji withdrew from active politics. Patel, who had worked hard to strengthen Rajaji's image, was enraged by his abrupt withdrawal and said,

How could anybody support you, if you act like this? You do not even consult us, but that has always been your way of life. I can not understand you.

However he accepted Rajaji's withdrawal from the Madras University constituency. This was the third time Rajaji had retired from political life, the other two occasions being in 1923 and 1936.

=== Birth of Dravidar Kazhagam ===
The Justice party which had been the main political alternative to the Congress in the Presidency went into political wilderness following its defeat in the 1937 elections. During the Anti-Hindi agitations of 1937-40, it allied itself closely with Periyar E. V. Ramasamy and his Self-Respect Movement. Periyar eventually took over the Justice party's leadership on 29 December 1938. On 27 August 1944, it was renamed as Dravidar Kazhagam (DK). Under Periyar, the secessionist demand for Dravida Nadu became its main political plank. The DK boycotted the 1946 elections.

== Constituencies ==
The Government of India Act of 1935 established a bicameral legislature in the Madras province. The legislature consisted of the governor and two legislative bodies - a legislative assembly and a legislative council. The legislative council consisted of a minimum of 54 and a maximum of 56 members. It was a permanent body not subject to dissolution by the governor, and one-third of its members retired every three years. 46 of its members were elected directly by the electorate, while the governor could nominate 8 to 10 members. The breakdown of seats in the council was as follows:

General	Mohammadans	Indian Christians	Europeans	Nominated
35	7	3	1	8-10

The act provided for a limited adult franchise based on property qualifications. Seven million people, roughly 15% of the Madras people holding land or paying urban taxes were qualified to be the electorate.

== Results ==
Party wise breakdown of seats after the 1946 election. (Total Number of Seats : 56; Elections Held for : 46; Nominated : 10):

Party	Seats
Indian National Congress	32
Madras Province Muslim League (MPML)	7
Others	7
Total	46

== See also ==
- 1946 Madras Presidency legislative assembly election
