= Thiagu Vaikarar =

Indian politician, Mannargudi Legislative Assemblyman 1946–1952

Member of the Madras Legislative Assembly
- In office 1946–1952
- Constituency: Mannargudi [General Rural (SC)]

Personal details
- Died: 10 March 1986
- Occupation: Politician, agriculturist, businessman

Thiagu Vaikarar was an Indian politician and former Member of the Legislative Assembly of Tamil Nadu. He was elected to the Tamil Nadu legislative assembly as a candidate from Mannargudi constituency in 1946 Legislative Assembly.
