= Bouloussou Soubramanion Sastroulou =

Politician in French India

Bouloussou Soubramaniom Sastroulou
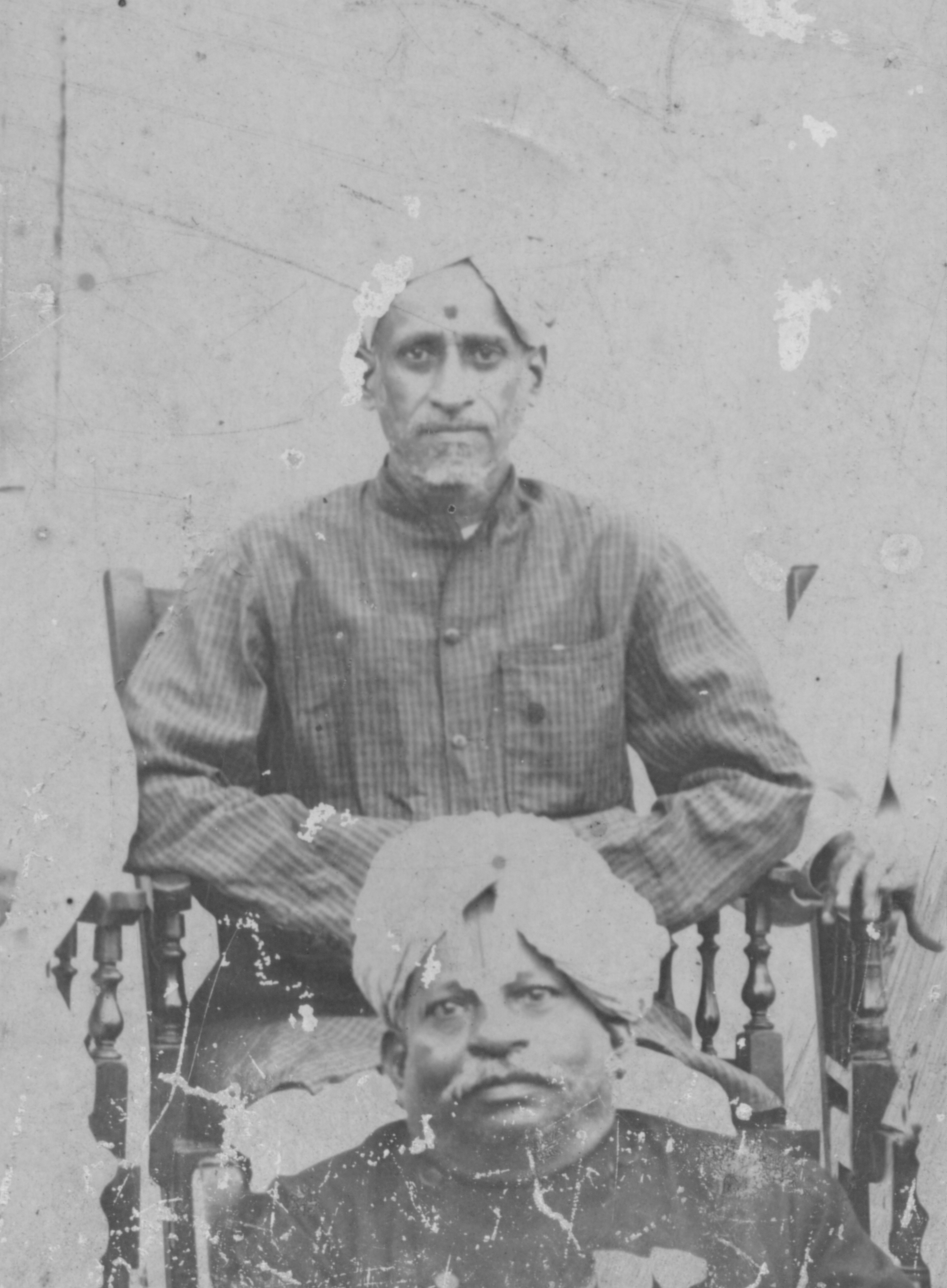
- Diwan de Manion Zamindar, Yanaon

Conseiller Local
- In office 10 June 1928 – 1934
- Preceded by: Kalla Vingata-Rattinom
- Succeeded by: Tota Narasinhassoimy
- Constituency: Yanaon

Assesseur appelé à Cour Criminelle de Yanaon
- In office 1917–1920
- Preceded by: Franz Ignace
- Succeeded by: Samatom Latchimi Narassaya

Assesseur appelé à Cour Criminelle de Yanaon
- In office 1934–1934
- Preceded by: Mohamed Saléha
- Succeeded by: Mohamed Saléha

Personal details
- Born: 1866 Yanaon, Inde Française, Empire Colonial Français
- Died: 13 September 1941 (aged 74–75) Yanaon, Inde française
- Party: Parti Bapanaya-Samatom
- Spouse: Boulousou Souryapracassamma (Bulusu Suryaprakasamma)
- Children: Jaganatha Sastry, Lakshminarayana Murty and Satyanarayanamourty
- Parents: Boulousou Zagannada Sastroulou (father); Boulousou Vincatanarasamma (mother)
- Relatives: Kala Venkata Rao (Brother-in-law); Sripada Krishnamurty Sastry (Co-brother); Kalluri Visalakshi (niece); Bulusu Krishna Chaitanya (great-grandson)

Bouloussou Soubramaniom Sastroulou (Bulusu Subrahmaṇya Śāstrulu; 1866 – 13 September 1941) was Diwan, Conseiller local and Judge Advocate during French colonial rule in Yanam in the early 20th century.

== Birth ==
Soubramaniom Sastroulou was born in Yanam in 1866 and was raised by his maternal grandmother, Veerubhotla Mahalakshmamma (వీరుభొట్ల మహలక్ష్మమ్మ Vīrubhoţla Mahalakṣhmamma). He was born to Bouloussou Zagannadha Sastroulou (జగన్నాథశాస్త్రులు Jagannāthaśāstrulu) through his second wife, Boulousou Vincatanarasamma (వెంకటనరసమ్మ Věnkaţanarsamma). He was third one among seven sons. Later, he was a prominent personality in Yanam during French rule in the early 20th century.

== Early life ==
He worked as Diwan for Manyam Zamindar for many years before entering politics. Manyam Mahalakshmamma, then Zamindarni quotes about him in her interview in 1902 with Vadivelu that was mentioned in his book,

...During the time of her former manager, owing to mismanagement, the estate was encumbered with debt, but everything has been set right after the present manager (Sastrulu) joined the staff of the Zemindarni's establishment. He has been a manager for the last fifteen years, during which period he has shown a large saving, and has thus saved the estate from decay and ruin. He is spoken of very highly by the French Governor (Rodier), and also by the Judge of Yanam...

He later became a landlord in Yanam and also joined Yanam politics. In one instance, his request to obtain authorization to appoint 2 members to the administration committee of the Vishnu and Siva Temples, replacing Counomreddy Kroustama and Marla-Pérousomayazoulou was accepted by Clement-Thomas, then Governor-General of French India on 21 September 1894.

== Political career ==
Sastroulou got elected to Conseil Local de Yanaon in 1928 from 'Bapanaya-Samatam party' and served until 1934. He was one of Bezawada Bapa Naidou's four Councillors in that council between 1928 and 1931 and later on under Kamichetty Venugopala Rao Naidou for the rest. He served as a Judge Advocate (Assesseur appelés) for the criminal court of Yanaon.

== Personal life ==
He was married to Bouloussou Souryapracassamma (సూర్యప్రకాశమ్మ Sūryaprakāśamma), daughter of Kala Latchminarayana and Kala Sodemma of Nadipudi village near Narasapur in West Godavari district. She is sister of former minister of Madras and Andhra Pradesh, Kala Venkata Rao. The couple had three sons namely, Bulusu Jaganadha Sastry, Bulusu Lakshminarayana Murthy and Bulusu Satyanarayana Murty. Eldest son B. J. Sastry was an engineer and was among the early life members of the Indian Science Congress Association (ISCA). Sastroulou was the co-brother of Sripada Krishnamurty Sastry, the first poet laureate of Andhra Pradesh through his wife Sripada Venkata Ratnamba (née Kala).

== Death ==
Sastroulou died at his ancestral house at Yanaon, situated in ruelle de Zalidinquy (Jaladanki street), Yanaon on 13 September 1941.

== Titles held ==
- Diwan of Manyam Zamindari of Yanaon under Maniom Mahalatchamamma, from 1888 to 1941
- Judge Advocate (Assesseur) for Criminal Court of Yanaon during 1917, 1918, 1919, 1920 and 1934

== Offices held ==
Government offices
Preceded by KALLA Vingata-Rattinom	Conseiller local de Yanaon; 10 June 1928–1934	Succeeded by TOTA Narasinhassoimy

== See also ==
- Municipal administration in French India
- Telugu people
