= Sripada Krishnamurty Sastry =

Indian poet (1866–1960)

Sripada Krishna Murthy Sastry
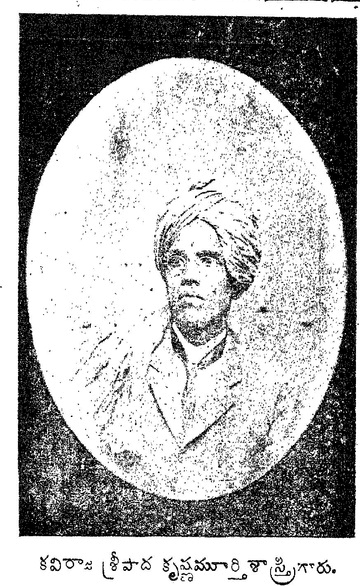
- Poet-Laurate of Andhra Pradesh
- Born: 29 October 1866
- Died: 29 December 1960 (aged 94); Rajahmundry, Andhra Pradesh, India
- Occupations: Playwright; poet; writer; laurate
- Years active: c. 1585–1613
- Parents: Sripada Venkata Somayajulu (father); Sripada Venkata Subbamma (mother)
- Awards: Padma Shri (1958)

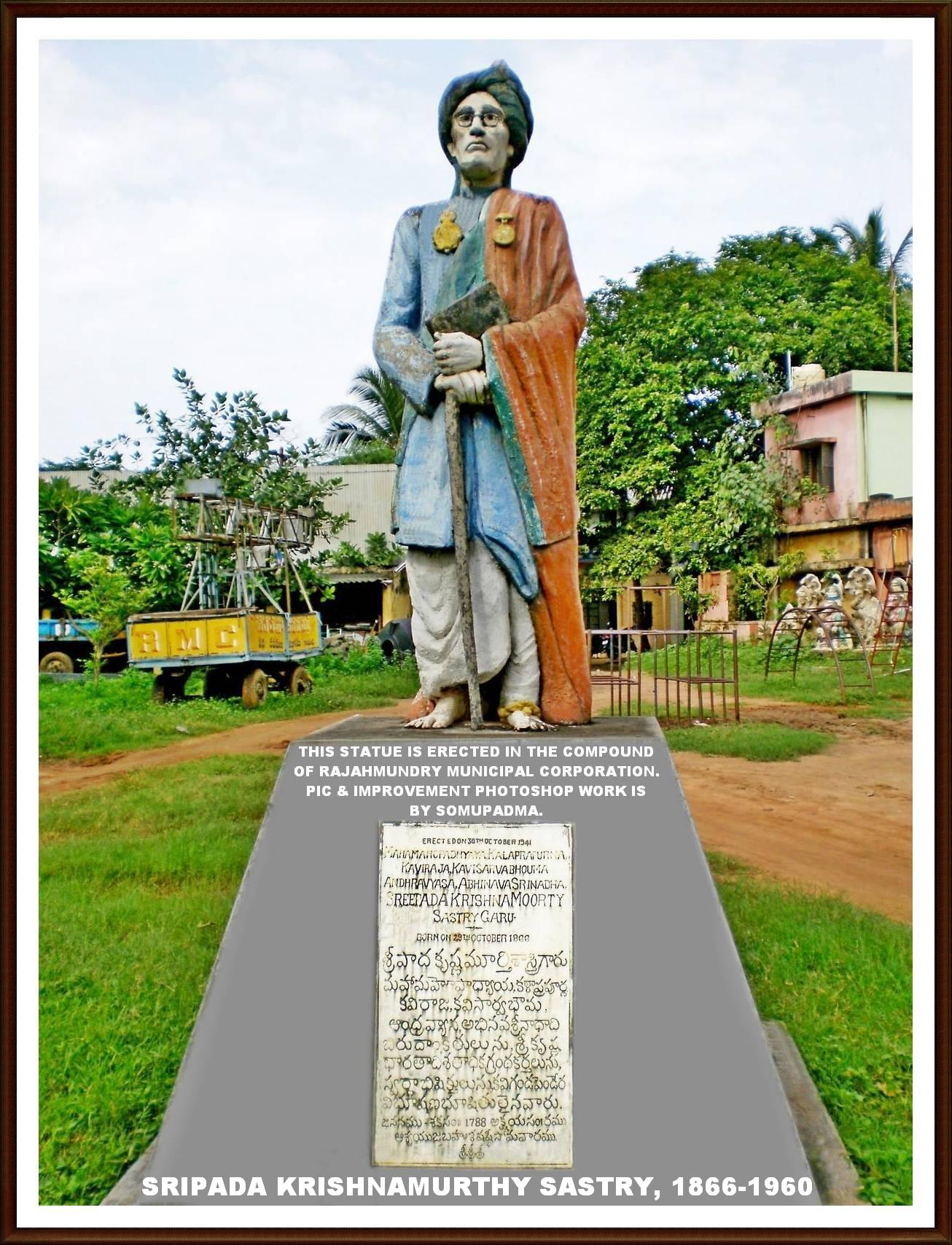
Statue of Sripada at Rajahmundry.

Kaviraz Krishna Murthy Sastry, of Sripada family (29 October 1866 – 29 December 1960), a native of Devarapalli of West Godavari district, was the first poet laureate ((ఆస్థాన కవి Asţhānakavi)) of Andhra Pradesh. He composed more than a hundred works in Telugu. He composed ‘Sri Krishnasweeyacharitam’, an autobiography in Sanskrit.

== Birth ==
Saastry was born to Sripada Venkata Somayajulu and Venkata Subbamma on 29 October 1866 at Ernagudem, West Godavar district of Andhra Pradesh.

== Marriage ==
He was married to Venkata Ratnamba (వెంకట రత్నాంబ Venkataratnāmba), daughter of Kala Lakshminarayana and Kala Somidevamma of Nadipudi village near Narasapur in West Godavari district. Thus, he became co-brother of French-era politician of Yanaon, Bouloussou Soubramanion Sastroulou and brother-in-law of Kala Venkata Rao, former minister of Madras and Andhra Pradesh.

== Awards and titles ==
His awards including Padma Sri in 1958, Suvarna Gandapenderam, Mani Kireetam, Mahamahopadhyaya insignia and medallions are preserved at the Visakha Museum, at Visakhapatnam. His titles include

- Mahamahopadhyaya (మహామహోపాధ్యాయ)
- Kavisarvabhauma (కవిసార్వభౌమ)
- Kaviraz (కవిరాజు)
- Kavibrahma (కవిబ్రహ్మ)
- Andhra Vyasa (ఆంధ్రవ్యాస)
- Abhinava Srinadha (అభినవ శ్రీనాథ)
- Vedavidya Visarada (వేద విద్యా విశారద)
- Prasanna Valmiki (ప్రసన్న వాల్మీకి)
- Kala Prapoorna (కళాప్రపూర్ణ)

== Death ==
He died in Rajahmundry on 29 December 1960.
