= P. S. Srinivasan =

Indian physician, freedom fighter, and politician (1893 – 1962)

Doctor P. S. Srinivasan

Member of Madras State Legislative Assembly
- In office 1949–1952

Member of Madras Presidency Legislative Assembly
- In office 1937–1939

Personal details
- Born: 20 July 1893 Pattukkottai, Madras Presidency, British India
- Died: 1962 (aged 68–69)

P. S. Srinivasan (20 July 1893 – 1962) was an Indian physician, freedom fighter, and politician who participated in the Indian independence movement.

== Life ==
Srinivasan was born on 20 July 1893 in Pattukkottai, Madras Presidency, British India. He completed his higher education at Presidency College and Madras Medical College, earning his medical degree in 1917. After two years of temporary service as a Government Medical Practitioner, he established himself as a private physician in Kanchipuram.

Inspired by the speeches of Mahatma Gandhi, Srinivasan joined the Indian independence movement. He served as the first secretary of the Congress Committee in Chengalpattu district and later became its president. His activism in the freedom movement led to his arrest on four occasions, resulting in several years of imprisonment.

Srinivasan entered electoral politics in 1937 as a member of the Madras Presidency Legislative Assembly. Later, in 1949, he was nominated to the Madras State Legislative Assembly, representing the Chengalpattu constituency in a by-election following the death of C. N. Muthuranga Mudaliar. He also held several responsibilities at the municipal level, serving as a member of the Kanchipuram Municipality for 25 years and served as its chairman from 1938 to 1958.

P. S. Srinivasan died in 1962.
