= Veeraswami =

Veeraswami is a surname. Notable people with the surname include:

- Arcot N. Veeraswami, Indian politician
- Bikkina Veeraswami (1886–1970), Indian politician
- Kuppuswami Naidu Veeraswami (1914–2010), Indian judge
