= R. Raghava Menon =

Indian politician (1892–1972)

Shri R. Raghava Menon
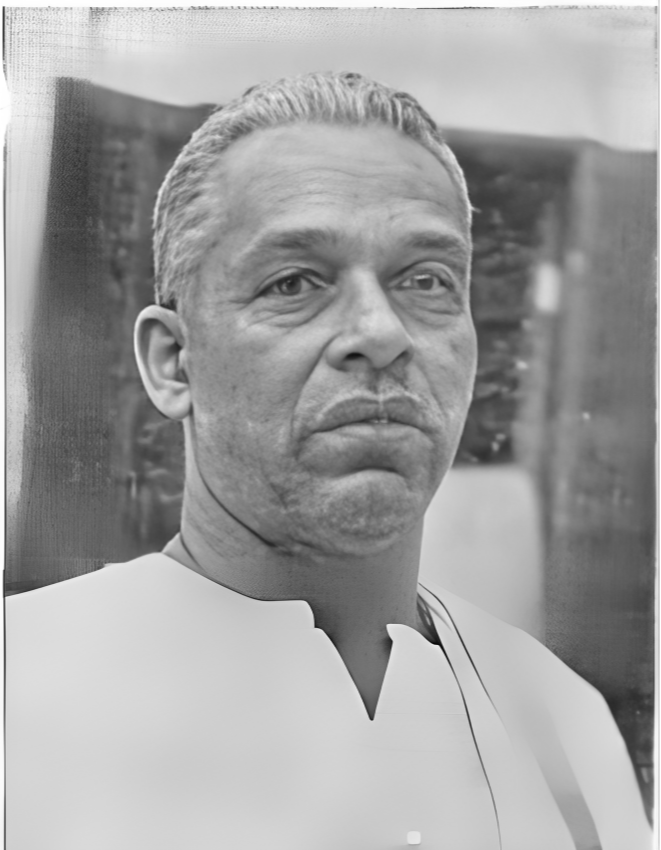

Member of the Legislative Assembly
- Constituency: Palghat General Rural Constituency

Minister for Food, Transport & House Rent Control (1946-47) in Madras State.

President of Kerala Provincial Congress Committee

Member of Minister in Mr. Prakasam’s Ministry

Personal details
- Born: 14 July 1892
- Died: 3 March 1972
- Political party: Indian National Congress
- Education: Victoria College, Palghat; St. Joseph's College, Trichinopoly; Law College, Trivandrum
- Alma mater: Law College, Trivandrum
- Occupation: Lawyer, Politician

R. Raghava Menon (14 July 1892 – 3 March 1972) was an Indian lawyer and politician, known for his involvement in the Indian National Congress and his contributions to public life.

He was appointed Agriculture Minister of the T. Prakasam government of the Madras Presidency in 1946.

He was a Member of the Madras Legislative Assembly from 1937-46 and 1946-51, and a Member of the first and second Kerala Legislative Assembly.
