= Kala Venkata Rao =

Indian independence activist and politician

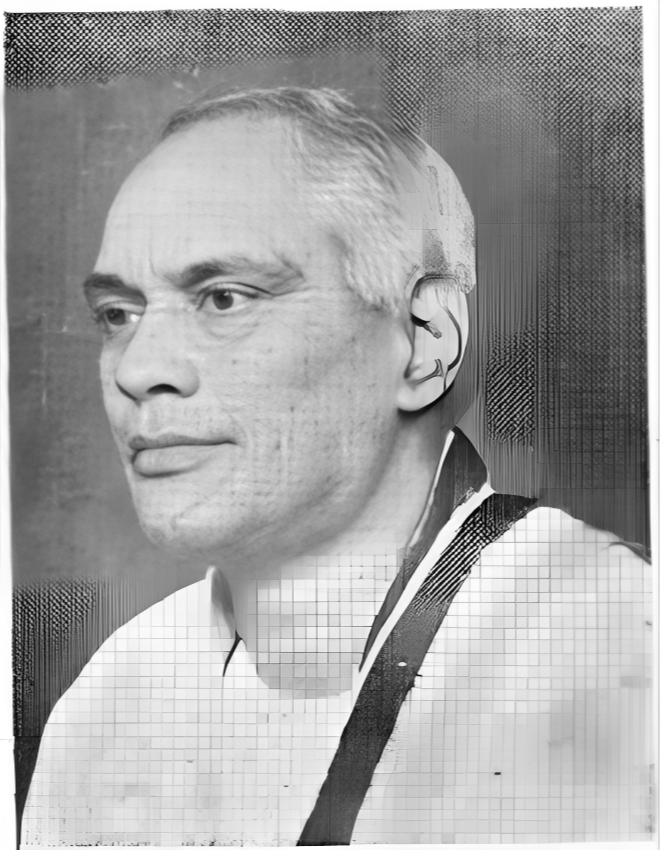

Minister of Revenue, Government of Andhra Pradesh
- In office 17 April 1957 – 28 March 1959
- Preceded by: Position established
- Succeeded by: Konda Venkata Ranga Reddy

Minister of Revenue, Madras Presidency
- In office 23 March 1947 – 24 January 1949
- Preceded by: K. Koti Reddi
- Succeeded by: H. Sitarama Reddi

Member of the Andhra Pradesh Legislative Assembly for Kothapeta
- In office 23 April 1955 – 28 March 1959
- Preceded by: Newly created
- Succeeded by: M.V.S.S. Raju

Member of the Madras Legislative Assembly for Amalapuram (General)
- In office 1937–1952
- Succeeded by: Nadimpalli Ramabhadra Raju

Personal details
- Born: 7 July 1900 Mukkamala, East Godavari District, British India
- Died: 28 March 1959 Hyderabad, Andhra Pradesh, India
- Party: Indian National Congress
- Spouse: Rajeswaramma
- Children: None
- Occupation: Freedom fighter, Politician

Kala Venkata Rao was an Indian independence activist and politician. He served as the Minister for Revenue in the governments of the Madras Presidency and Andhra Pradesh. He also served as the Minister of Finance in the latter.

A member of the Indian National Congress, Rao served as vice-president and general secretary of the Andhra Pradesh Congress Committee (APCC) between 1939 and 1946. He also served as general secretary of the All India Congress Committee (AICC) between 1949 and 1951. Recognizing his role in the independence movement, Neelam Sanjiva Reddy called him the "Dronacharya" of the Andhra movement struggle. He was also referred as Andhra Patel.

== Birth ==
Rao was born in Mukkamala, East Godavari District of Andhra Pradesh on 7 July 1900 to Kala Brahmayya and Kala Venkamma. His parents were originally from Nadipudi village, West Godavari District of Andhra Pradesh. Mukkamala was his maternal grandmother's village. He had a younger sister and he was three years elder than her.

== Education ==
Rao had his primary education at his native place Mukkamala and secondary education at Middle School, Pulletikurru and Board High School, Amalapuram. He joined intermediate class in Maharajah's College, Vizianagaram. He passed Intermediate and joined B.A. in the same college during the academic year 1919–20. But he was sent out of college as he happened to be ring-leader of anti-British feelings in the college. Thereupon he joined senior B.A. class at Noble College, Machilipatnam. Those were the days of non-cooperation movement. When Mahatma Gandhi gave a call for boycott of the law courts, educational institutions and legislative bodies, Kala Venkata Rao who was bubbling with patriotic enthusiasm responded to this call; gave up his studies and jumped into the fray.

== Marriage ==
Rao married Rajeswaramma, the daughter of Duvvuri Venkateswarulu, then the village munsiff of Mukkamala, on 20 April 1914. His father-in-law was a great patriot, philanthropist and gentleman. He is related to Sripada Krishnamurty Sastry, the first poet laureate of Andhra Pradesh and Bouloussou Soubramanion Sastroulou, politician from French Yanam through their wives and Sripada Venkata Ratnamba (née Kala) and Bouloussou Souryapracassamma (née Kala), respectively.

== Politics ==
Rao was a freedom fighter and joined the Indian National Congress. He was elected as M.L.A. from Amalapuram assembly constituency (general) located in East Godavari district of Madras presidency in 1937 Legislative election and 1946 Legislative election. He held cabinet ministries during tenures of Omandur Ramaswamy Reddiar and Kumaraswamy Raja. He was also a member of Indian Constituent Assembly elected from Madras Presidency. He was member of 7-member Partition Committee which was set up on 7 December 1949 by then Madras Government for the formation of Andhra State out of Madras State. The committee was set up under the Chairmanship of Kumaraswamy Raja, the then Chief Minister of Madras Presidency, wherein Andhra was represented by other members along with him such as Tanguturi Prakasam, Bezawada Gopala Reddy and Neelam Sanjiva Reddy. However, he was runner-up from Amalapuram constituency in 1952 election, where he lost to Nadimpalli Ramabhadra Raju of KMPP. He was also member of AICC. Later, Andhra state formed in 1953 and Amalapuram constituency became single seat reserved one. He then got as M.L.A. elected from nearby Kothapeta constituency in 1955 election.

== Death ==
Rao died on 28 March 1959 in Hyderabad from cardiac arrest while he was recovering from influenza. The Speaker of the Lok Sabha, M. A. Ayyangar, while paying homage to Rao called him "one of the stalwart statesmen of Andhra Pradesh".

== Offices held ==
Government offices
| Preceded by K. Koti Reddi | Minister of Revenue of Madras Presidency; 23 March 1947 – 24 January 1949 | Succeeded by H. Sitarama Reddi |
| Preceded by A. B. Shetty | Minister of Health of Madras State; 26 September 1951 – 9 April 1952 | Succeeded by A. B. Shetty |
| Preceded by Post Created | Minister of Land Reforms of Andhra Pradesh; 11 November 1956 – 28 March 1959 | Succeeded by Post Ceased |
| Preceded by Post Created | Minister of Finance of Andhra Pradesh; 11 November 1956 – 16 April 1957 | Succeeded by Bezawada Gopala Reddy |
| Preceded by Post Created | Minister of Revenue of Andhra Pradesh; 17 April 1957 – 28 March 1959 | Succeeded by K. V. Ranga Reddy |

| Preceded by - | General Secretary of Indian National Congress; January 1949–September 1951 | Succeeded by - |

== See also ==
- 1946 Madras Presidency legislative assembly election
- 1952 Madras State legislative assembly election
- Bouloussou Soubramanion Sastroulou
