= Yedida Kameswara Rao =

Indian freedom fighter (1913–1996)

"Balabarathi" Yedida Kameswara Rao (September 13, 1913 – 1995), better known as Radio Annayya, was an Indian freedom fighter who worked as secretary for Tanguturi Prakasam.

From 1936 to 1945, he worked as sub editor for the "Swarajya" daily newspaper, the "Gruhalakshmi" Monthly magazine, and the "Prajamitra" fortnightly magazine. In 1949, he was invited by Sri Ayyagari Veerabhadra Rao to All India Radio in Vijayawada, where he worked for more than 30 years as a producer of children's programs, promoting children's listening clubs and nurturing children as singers and actors.
