= M. Muhammad Ismail =

Indian politician (1896–1972)

Quaid-e-Millat M. Muhammad Ismail
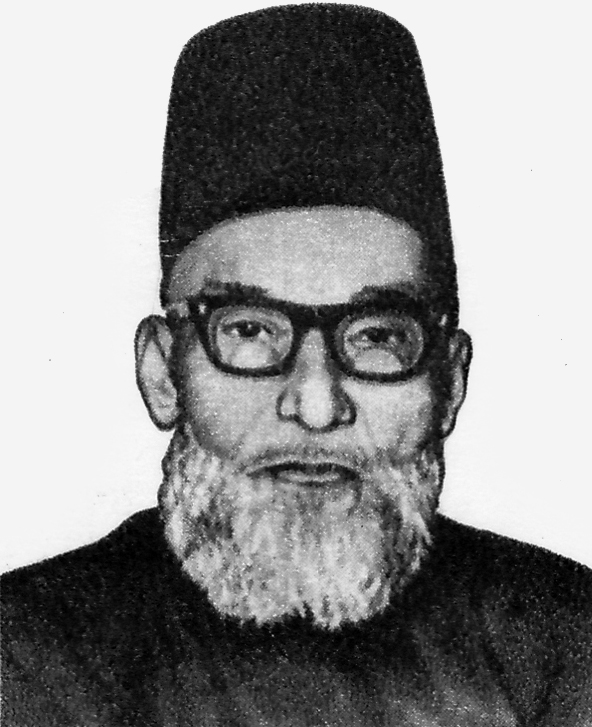
- M. Muhammad Ismail on a 1996 postage stamp of India

Member of the Madras Legislative Assembly
- In office 1946–1952

Member of the Indian Constituent Assembly
- In office 1948–1952
- Constituency: Madras

Member of Parliament, Rajya Sabha
- In office 3 April 1952 – 2 April 1958
- Constituency: Madras

Member of Parliament, Lok Sabha
- In office 1962 – 5 April 1972
- Constituency: Manjeri

Personal details
- Born: 5 June 1896 Tirunelveli, Madras Presidency, British India
- Died: 5 April 1972 (aged 75) Madras, Tamil Nadu, India
- Party: All-India Muslim League (1930–1947); Indian Union Muslim League (after 1948)
- Spouse: Jamal Hameeda Bi
- Relations: K. T. M. Ahmed Ibrahim Sahib (brother)
- Children: Jamal Miakhan (son)

Miakhan Muhammad Ismail (5 June 1896—5 April 1972) was an Indian politician and social worker from southern Indian state Tamil Nadu. He was a founder of the Indian Union Muslim League party after the partition of British India. He was popularly known in Tamil Nadu and Kerala as the "Quaid-e-Millat" ("the Leader of the Nation"). Ismail was a member of Madras Legislative Assembly and Leader of the Opposition (1946—52). He was also a member (1948—50) of the Constituent Assembly, the drafting body of the constitution of India. He was also a member of Rajya Sabha (1952—58) and Lok Sabha (3rd, 1962—67, 4th, 1967—70 and 5th, 1971—72).

== Early life and career ==
M. Muhammad Ismail Rowther was born in Pettai, Tirunelveli, in what is now the Indian state of Tamil Nadu, on 5 June 1896 to Maulavi K. T. Miakhan Rowther in a Tirunelveli Rowther family. He was educated at C. M. S. College and Hindu College at Tirunelveli and later at St. Joseph's College, Trichinopoly and Christian College, Madras.

Ismail started the 'Young Muslim Society' in his home town Tirunelveli Pettai in 1909 ( as a 13-year-old). He was also instrumental in establishing Majlis ul-Ulama ('the Council of Islamic Scholars') in 1918. He went into business in the 1920s and became a leader of Madras leather industry and eventually of Madras commerce.

Ismail married Jamal Hameeda Biwi in November 1923. Ismail's brother, K. T. M. Ahmed Ibrahim, was also a principal leader of the All-India Muslim League in Madras Presidency. Ismail served as Vice President, Muslim Educational Association of Southern India and Anjuman Himayat-e-Islam. He was also a founding member of the Tamil Valarchi Kazhagam, Madras.

== Political career ==
=== With the All-India Muslim League ===
Success in Madras commerce led Ismail into Indian politics. Along with K. M. Seethi Saheb, B. Pocker and K. Uppi Saheb, he was one of the principal leaders of All-India Muslim League in Madras Presidency from the mid-1930s.

In 1945, he became the President of the Madras Presidency unit of the All-India Muslim League. In the elections to the Madras legislature, the League won all but ten of the reserved seats in 1936 and all in 1946. The League emerged as the second largest party in the Assembly after the 1946 elections and Ismail served as the Leader of the Opposition in the Legislative Assembly during 1946–52.

=== With the Indian Union Muslim League ===
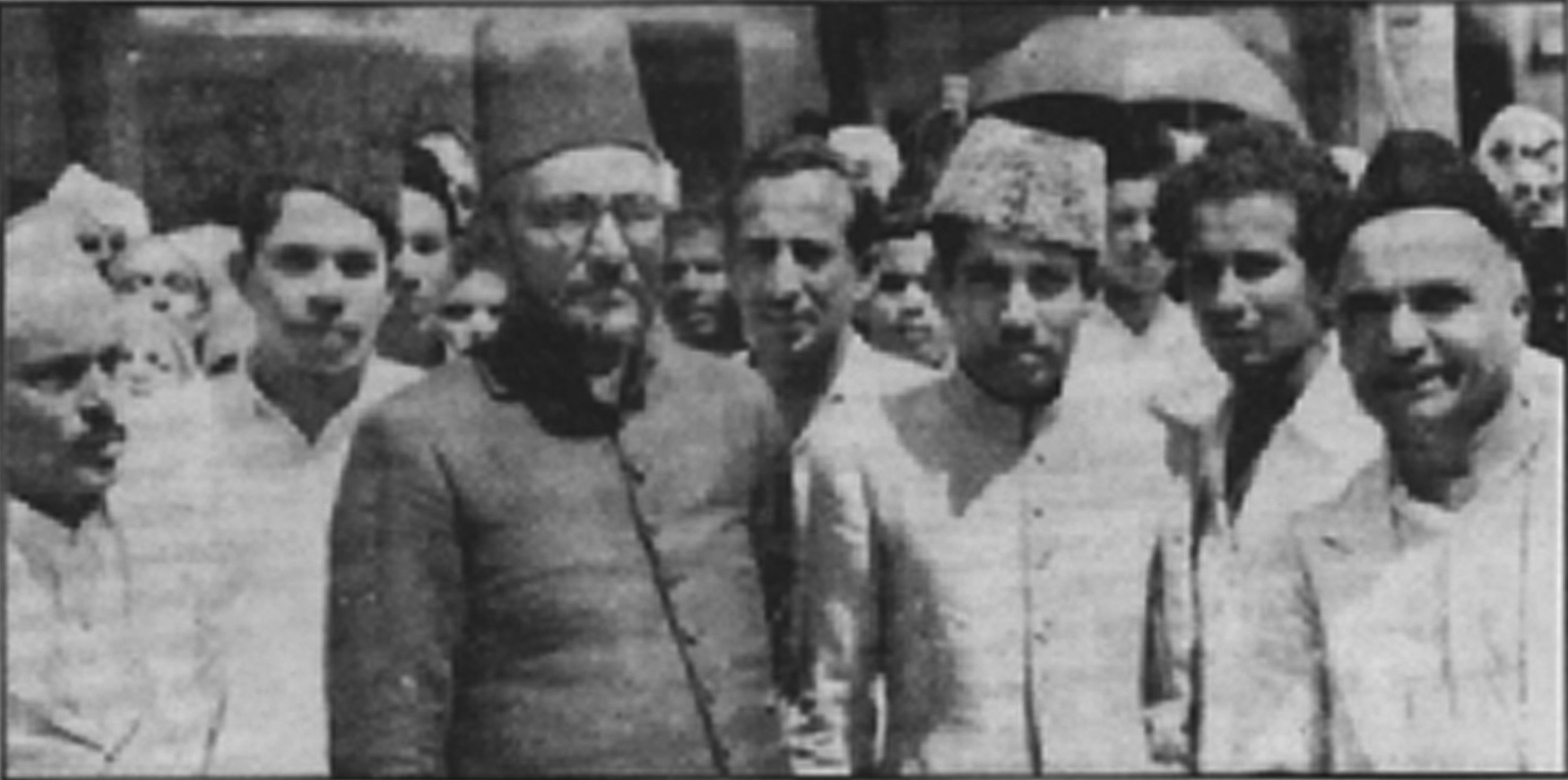
Indian Union Muslim League leadership with Muhammad Ismail in 1954.

When British India was partitioned into India and Pakistan, the All-India Muslim League was virtually disbanded (December, 1947). Ismail, the then President of the Madras Muslim League, was chosen as the Convener of the Indian segment of the League. The Indian members of the League formed the Indian Union Muslim League at Madras (first council in March, 1948 and constitution passed in September, 1951). Ismail was chosen as the first President of Indian Union Muslim League.

After partition of India, Muslims were still well represented in the Constituent Assembly, the drafting body of the constitution of India (almost all of these lawmakers had been elected on League tickets). Only those from Madras Presidency formally adhered to the League. Ismail was elected from the Madras Legislative Assembly to the Constituent Assembly in 1948. When the report of the Advisory Committee on Minorities was debated (1949), Ismail moved a motion for the retention of reserved seats for Muslims and a separate communal electorate. The Assembly summarily rejected this motion. Ismail Sahib wanted Tamil to be the Official Language of India.

=== Attempts for an alliance ===
In the 1950s, Ismail started negotiating with the stubborn High Command in New Delhi (through the Madras leadership) for an electoral alliance with the Congress. Some informal or local alliances with the Madras Congress were realized. The party thereupon suffered a rout in the 1957 General Elections and witnessed a major split in 1961 (instigated by Mohammed Raza Khan, M. S. A. Majeed and K. T. Sheriff). League in due course allied with Dravida Munnetra Kazhagam and Swatantra Party.

In 1952, Ismail was elected to the Rajya Sabha from Madras with support of the independent candidates endorsed by the League.

=== As a Member of Parliament from Kerala ===
When the state of Kerala was formed by the States Reorganisation Act in 1956, Ismail his constituency to northern Kerala. He was elected to the Lok Sabha from Manjeri Parliamentary Constituency three times – in 1962 (Third Lok Sabha), 1967 (Fourth Lok Sabha) and 1971 (Fifth Lok Sabha) as an Indian Union Muslim League candidate.

During the 1962 India-China War, Ismail famously offered to send his son Mian Khan to join the Indian Army to fight against China.

General Elections
General Election	Constituency	Winner	Party	Runner up	Margin
1962 (Third)	Manjeri	M. Muhammad Ismail	Indian Union Muslim League	Muhammed Kunju (CPI)	4,328
1967 (Fourth)	Manjeri	M. Muhammad Ismail	Indian Union Muslim League	A. N. Beevi (Congress)	107,494
1971 (Fifth)	Manjeri	M. Muhammad Ismail	Indian Union Muslim League	S. P. Mumammed Ali (Ind.)	119,837

== Business career ==
Ismail went into business in the 1920s and was involved in various commerce committees. He was a noted businessman of the Madras Presidency involved in leather and meat industry.

The boards and committees he was a member of include:

- Madras Port Trust Board, Madras Board of Industries, Madras Provincial Marketing Board, Madras Excise Licensing Board, and South India Railway Advisory Committee.
- Industrial Planning Committee (Government of Madras), South India Chamber of Commerce and Industry (once Vice-President of the Chamber), Federation of Indian Chambers of Commerce and Industry, and Court of Aligarh Muslim University.
- Indian Council of Agricultural Research (Hides and Skins), Hides Cess Enquiry Committee, Mica Enquiry Committee, Chairman of Leather and Leather Goods Committee, Government of Madras, Honorary Secretary and Vice-President of Southern India Skin and Hide Merchants Association, Madras and President, Madras State Mutton Dealers Chamber.

== Legacy ==
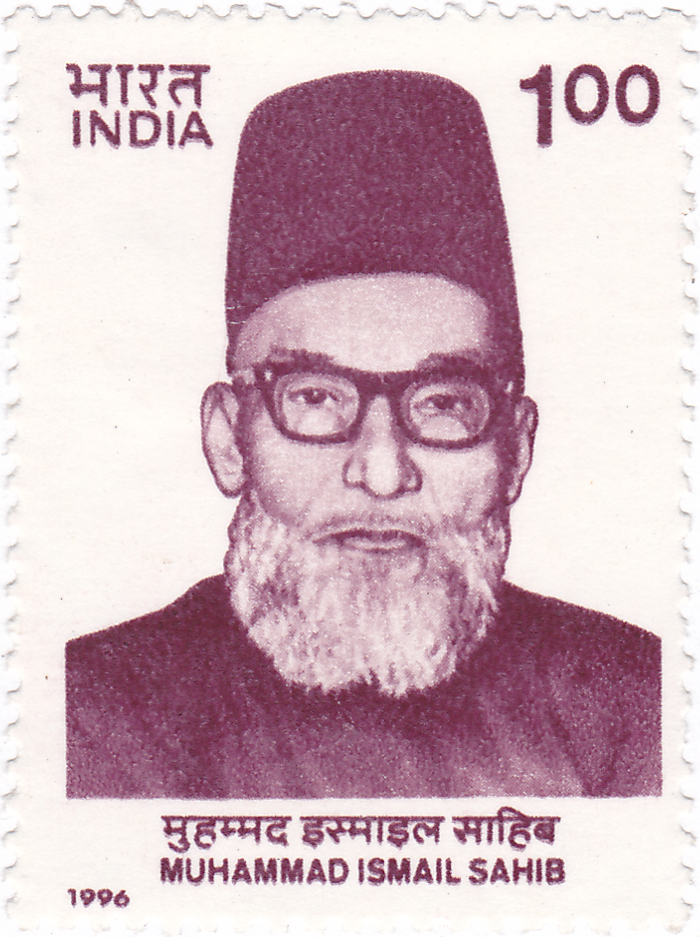
A commemorative postal stamp issued by Government of India

M. Muhammad Ismail died in 1972 (after a prolonged illness). Indian National Congress politician M. Bhaktavatsalam, former Chief Minister of Tamil Nadu, paying his tribute, described Ismail as "a model for all Opposition leaders".

- A number of colleges in Tamil Nadu including the Quaid-e-Millath Government College for Women, Chennai and Quaid-e-Millat College, Medavakkam, Chennai have been named after M. Muhammad Ismail.
- The Tamil Nadu Government renamed Nagapattinam District as "Nagai Quaid-e-Millat" District in M. Muhammad Ismail's honour (however, it reverted to its old name in 1997, when all names of individuals were dropped from the names of districts and transport corporations).
- In 2003, the Tamil Nadu Government constructed a memorial hall for M. Muhammad Ismail.
