= K. T. M. Ahmed Ibrahim =

Indian politician

Member of the Constituent Assembly of India
- In office 14 July 1947 – 24 January 1950

Personal details
- Born: Pettai, Tirunelveli, Tamil Nadu
- Party: All-India Muslim League
- Relations: Muhammad Ismail Sahib (Brother)
- Education: C. M. College, Hindu College, Trivandrum

K. T. Miakhan Ahmed Ibrahim Sahib was an Indian politician. He was the Member of the Constituent Assembly of India from 14 July 1947 to 24 January 1950. He was a Leader of the All-India Muslim League.

== Early life and education ==
Ibrahim was born in Pettai, Tirunelveli, Tamil Nadu. He is the son of late Maulvi Miakhan Rowther, a scholar in Tamil, sanskrit, Arabic and Urdu.

Ahmed Ibrahim sahib was educated in C. M. College and Hindu College, Trivandrum. He completed Bachelor of Arts in 1919 and the Bachelor of Law in 1921.

== Movement ==
He entered in active politics while still a student. He associated with his brother M. Mohammed Ismail Sahib, MLA took an active part in the Non-Cooperation Movement and was responsible for the passing of the Non Co-Operation resolution for the first time in India at the 26th Provincial Political conference held in Tirunelveli in 1920.
