= Manyam Zamindar =

Manyam Zamindar were Zamindars from the family of Manyam, belonging to the Komati Arya Vysya sub-caste. They actively participated in the administrative and financial affairs of Yanaon in French-occupied India. In first half of twentieth century, the last Manyam Zamindar died without a male heir and was succeeded by his son-in-law. The new Zamindar was referred as Kotha Venkataratnam Zamindar.

Their revenue affairs were handled by an appointed diwan. Monsieur Bouloussou Soubramaniam Sastroulou had been Diwan under Manyam Zamindars until his death in 1941.

== Manyam Villa ==
The residence of Manyam Zamindars was referred to among locals as Manyam vaari meda. Many important meetings and functions used to be conducted at their house.

A Manyam Villa is a large two-storeyed villa constructed in Indo-French colonial architectural style. It is square, symmetrical shape with central door, and straight lines of windows on the first and second floor. There is a decorative crown above the door and flattened columns to either side of it. The door leads to an entryway with stairway and hall aligned along the center of the house. All rooms branch off of these. The columns used were of classical order (Doric and Ionic styles).

== Legend ==
According to one legend, there was a saint's curse on the family that it would languish without a male heir and its glory would fade. Generally the family of Manyam were staunch followers of the Vaishnava sect of Sanatana Dharma.

== See also ==
- Bouloussou Soubramaniam Sastroulou
- Samatam Krouschnaya
- Yanam, French India
