= Tanguturi Prakasam =

Chief Minister of Andhra State from 1953 to 1954

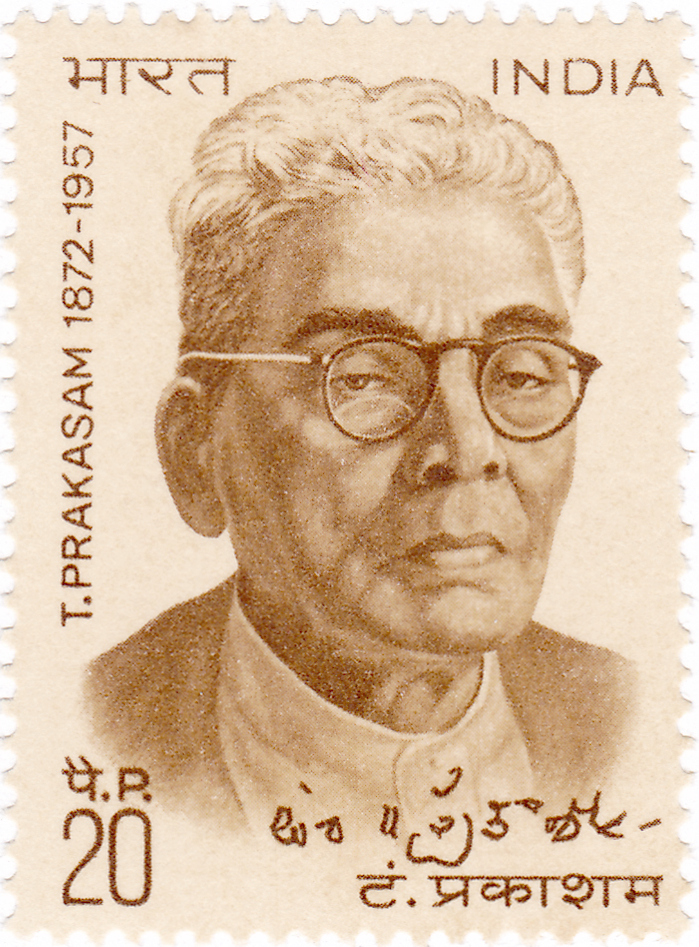
- Tanguturi Prakasam on a 1972 commemorative stamp

Chief Minister of Andhra State
- In office 1 October 1953 – 15 November 1954
- Governor: Chandulal Madhavlal Trivedi
- Deputy: Neelam Sanjiva Reddy
- Preceded by: Office established (C. Rajagopalachari as Chief Minister of Madras State)
- Succeeded by: Bezawada Gopala Reddy

Premier of Madras Presidency
- In office 30 April 1946 – 23 March 1947
- Governor: Henry Foley Knight; Archibald Nye
- Preceded by: Governor's rule
- Succeeded by: O. P. Ramaswamy Reddiyar

Personal details
- Born: 23 August 1872 Vinodarayunipalem, Madras Presidency, British India
- Died: 20 May 1957 (aged 84) Hyderabad, Andhra Pradesh, India (now Telangana, India)
- Party: Indian National Congress
- Other political affiliations: Praja Party; Kisan Mazdoor Praja Party; Praja Socialist Party
- Spouse: Hanumayamma
- Profession: Lawyer; Anti-colonial activist; Politician
- Nickname: Andhra Kesari

Tanguturi Prakasam (23 August 1872 – 20 May 1957), also known as Prakasam Pantulu, was an Indian jurist, politician, and Gandhian anti-colonial nationalist. During a demonstration against the Simon Commission in Madras, he exposed his chest to armed police and dared them to shoot. A major anti-colonial leader, his actions earned him the epithet 'Andhra Kesari' (lit. 'Lion of Andhra') among his admirers. He served as the premier of the Madras Presidency from 1946 to 1947 and played a major role in the abolition of Zamindari in the region. Following Indian independence, Tanguturi served as the first chief minister of the newly created Andhra State, from 1953 to 1954.

== Early life ==
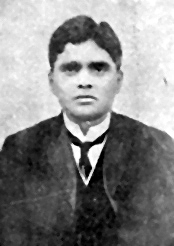
Tanguturi Prakasam as a barrister

Tanguturi Prakasam was born on 23 August 1872 in Vinodarayunipalem, Madras Presidency, British India, into a family of karanams (hereditary accountants) and landholders on the Venkatagiri zamindari estates. During the Great Famine of 1876–1878, the family had sold some land to pay revenue taxes. Tanguturi Prakasam received his early education locally.

Following the death of his father when he was eleven years old, Tanguturi's mother was forced to assume the responsibility of earning for the family, leading to financial struggles. The family moved to Rajahmundry in 1887 with the assistance of Immaneni Hanumanta Rao Naidu, who served as Tanguturi's mentor. Shortly after their arrival, Naidu established the Rajahmundry Hindu Nataka Samajam (lit. 'Rajahmundry Hindu Drama Society'), which Tanguturi subsequently joined.

Tanguturi was elected to the Rajahmundry Municipal Council in 1900, eventually assuming its presidency in 1903. During his tenure on the council, he developed close associations with a number of Rajahmundry activists who were engaged both with the Indian National Congress (INC; often simply known as "the Congress") and with local district organisations. Having qualified as a pleader in 1901, he travelled to the United Kingdom to undertake professional legal training in 1904. Upon his return to India, he was called to the bar in 1907 and thereafter relocated to Madras, where he practised as a barrister at the Madras High Court. His legal career proved to be highly lucrative.

== Role in the Indian independence movement ==
Tanguturi is considered to be a nationalist leader in the Indian independence movement, who was aligned with Gandhism. Tanguturi joined the movement in 1921, following Mahatma Gandhi's call for non-cooperation, quitting his legal profession in the process. He began a daily newspaper named Swarajya, (Note: Not to be confused with Swarajya (magazine), which was founded in 1956 by Khasa Subba Rao, under the patronage of C. Rajagopalachari.) to further spread the message of non-cooperation. Joining the Congress, Tanguturi was elected as the president of the Andhra Region Congress Committee the same year.

In 1928, the Simon Commission, a delegation of seven members of the British Parliament, arrived in British India to assess and recommend proposals for liberal reforms. The absence of Indian members in the commission led to widespread opposition across the subcontinent, causing protests, strikes, civil disobedience, and a boycott of the commission, all of which led to a surge in nationalism. Among the leading opponents of the commission was Tanguturi. During its visit to Madras, Tanguturi took part in a protest held near the Madras High Court. As public demonstrations were unlawful at the time, the police intervened and opened fire on the crowd, killing one protester. They then warned others they would be shot if they approached the body. Tanguturi exposed his chest to the armed officers, daring them to fire.

In response to Mahatma Gandhi's call to oppose the British salt monopoly in 1930, Tanguturi led a Salt March from the village of Devarampadu. This action was undertaken in coordination with Gandhi's Dandi March. In celebration of the event, Rajendra Prasad unveiled the Vijaytosava Stupa in 1935.

Following his reported act of defiance against the Simon Commission in 1928 and his independent Salt March in 1930, Tanguturi's admirers came to refer to him with the epithet 'Andhra Kesari' (lit. 'Lion of Andhra').

== Premier of Madras Presidency (1946–1947) ==
Tanguturi served as the Revenue Minister in the cabinet of C. Rajagopalachari during the latter's tenure as the Premier of the Madras Presidency from 1937 to 1939. In this capacity, he produced a comprehensive report advocating for the abolition of Zamindari, a feudal system of autonomous or semi-autonomous lords and estates. Tanguturi sought to establish land ownership for the Ryot, a class of Indian peasants.

Following his success in the 1946 Madras Presidency Legislative Assembly election, Tanguturi assumed office as the Premier of the Madras Presidency. Tanguturi resigned in 1947 due to an internal party rebellion. Much of the factionalism that led to the resignation of Tanguturi was caused by K. Kamaraj. Zamindari was legally abolished in the state the following year.

== Post-independence activities ==
Following independence, Tanguturi emerged as a significant dissenting figure within the Congress. He levied allegations against several Members of Parliament and Union Ministers, both serving and former. His allegations were primarily regarding the misuse of permits, as well as against politicians involved in scandals. Those accused had denied the claims and called them "baseless". In February 1950, a report on his complaints was made by a three-member committee, comprising Prime Minister Jawaharlal Nehru, Deputy Prime Minister Vallabhbhai Patel, and President Rajendra Prasad, following an earlier report by Congress General Secretary Shankarrao Deo. However, Tanguturi attacked both reports for being "one-sided". When served a show-cause notice, Tanguturi replied, "the cause of discipline would be much better served by the Working Committee [of the Congress] by welcoming the inquiry if only to protect the fair name of the Congress". Beginning on 23 November 1950, the motion was tabled in front of a large audience of members. Tanguturi faced allegations of having ulterior motives, with Vemula Kurmayya, a significant leader in the Andhra region, attributing Tanguturi's campaign to his frustration with losing power in 1947. The debate on the motion was put to a voice vote on 14 December, which concluded with Tanguturi's resolution being rejected.

In the Andhra region, the Congress was internally divided into two factions, one led by Bhogaraju Pattabhi Sitaramayya and supported by Kala Venkata Rao and Neelam Sanjiva Reddy, the other led by Tanguturi and supported by N. G. Ranga, Tenneti Viswanadham, and Gouthu Latchanna. In May 1951, Tanguturi and Ranga formally parted ways with the Congress and established the Praja Party. Around the same period, at the national level, dissidents led by J. B. Kripalani, who held ideological disagreements with Nehru, broke away from the Congress to form the Kisan Mazdoor Praja Party (KMPP). Tanguturi's Praja Party merged with the KMPP later that year.

Tanguturi assumed leadership of the KMPP's unit in the Madras State. In 1952, the KMPP merged with the Socialist Party to create the Praja Socialist Party (PSP) at the national level. However, the party continued to maintain its distinct earlier regional identity in the Andhra region. In 1953, the Andhra unit of the KMPP was reconstituted by Tanguturi as the Praja Party, functioning independently of the national PSP. Following the formation of the Andhra State in October 1953, the regional Praja Party merged with the local unit of the Socialist Party to form the Andhra branch of the PSP, led again by Tanguturi.

== Chief Minister of Andhra State (1953–1954) ==
In the newly established Andhra State, no single political party achieved a majority in the legislative assembly, necessitating the formation of a coalition government. This coalition comprised the Congress, the Krishikar Lok Party (KLP), and the Andhra unit of the PSP, going against the national leadership of the PSP which had declined the invitation to join the coalition ministry. Although all parties in the coalition wished for Tanguturi to become the first Chief Minister, the Congress refused to accept a non-Congress leader. Tanguturi, a member of the PSP and its President in the Andhra region, resigned from his party and rejoined the Congress, subsequently becoming the Chief Minister on the day of the state's inception. Tanguturi's defection caused a rift within the Andhra Unit of the PSP: one faction led by Tenneti Viswanadham supported the government, while the other led by Pusapati Vijayarama Gajapati Raju stood in opposition to it. When the PSP's national executive voiced its disapproval of Tanguturi's actions, the Raju faction aligned itself with the national leadership, prompting Viswanadham to resign from the party. Following his resignation from the PSP, Viswanadham reorganised the Praja Party and extended its support to Tanguturi's government. In response, Tanguturi made Viswanadham the first Finance Minister of Andhra State.

Although the KLP initially supported Tanguturi's government, it clashed with the administration over the choice of a capital for the newly created state. Tanguturi and the Congress favoured Kurnool, while the KLP pressed for Visakhapatnam. When Kurnool was ultimately selected, the KLP withdrew from the coalition. The ruling alliance was thereafter composed of the Congress, the Praja Party, and supporting independents. Nonetheless, the instability had made the government vulnerable.

In 1954, a policy of prohibition was recommended to the government by the ad hoc S. V. Ramamurthy Committee. However, Tanguturi refused to compromise on the issue and thus, the government did not implement the policy. In reaction, on 4 November 1954, the KLP introduced a motion of no confidence against Tanguturi's administration. The motion was successfully passed by a narrow margin of one vote, leading to the collapse of the government on 15 November 1954. In the aftermath, President's rule was imposed until the 1955 Andhra State Legislative Assembly election, in which Bezawada Gopala Reddy, representing the Congress, was elected Chief Minister.

== Death and legacy ==
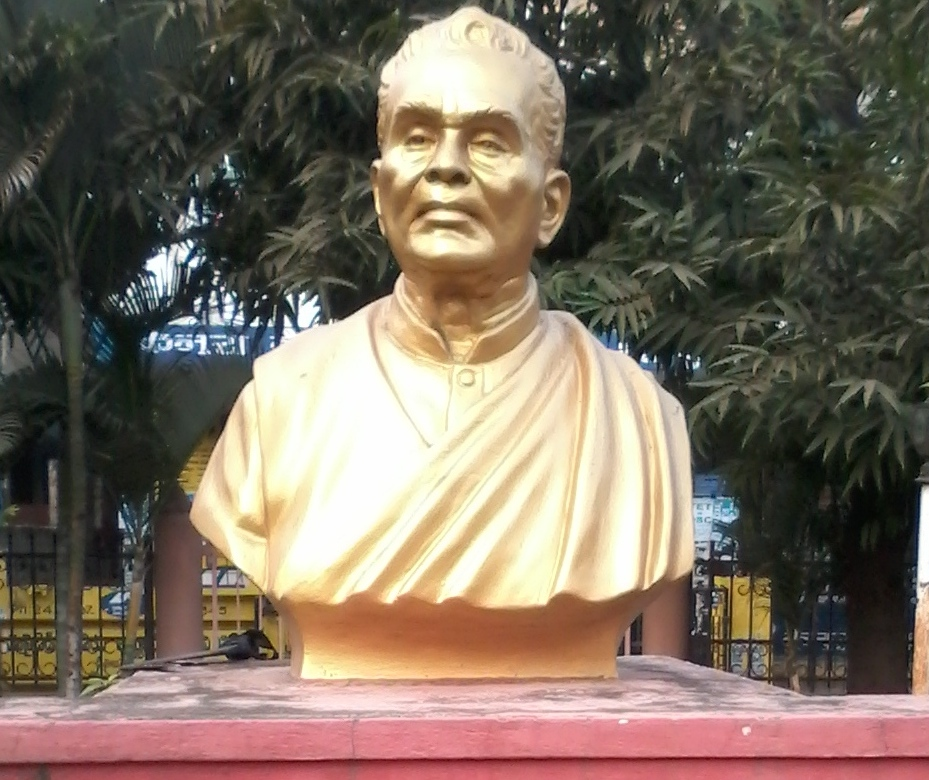
Bust of Tanguturi Prakasam in Rajahmundry

Tanguturi Prakasam died on 20 May 1957, in Hyderabad, Andhra Pradesh, after a brief illness.

In 1972, the Ongole district of Andhra Pradesh was renamed to Prakasam district in his memory. In 1983, a Telugu-language biographical film titled Andhra Kesari, based on the life of Tanguturi, was released. In 2014, the government of Andhra Pradesh declared his birth anniversary to be a state function. The Andhra Kesari University, named after Tanguturi, was established in Ongole in 2022.

== See also ==
- Suryakumari
- Yedida Kameswara Rao
