= Omandur =

- Gram panchayat
- Location in Tamil Nadu, India Omandur (India)
- Coordinates: 11°01′44″N 78°40′08″E
- Country: India
- State: Tamil Nadu
- District: Tiruchirappalli
- Taluk: Manachanallur
- Elevation: 194 m (636 ft)

Population (2001)
  - Total: 6,697

Languages
  - Official: Tamil
- Time zone: UTC+5:30 (IST)

Omandur (also spelt as Omandhur) is a village in Tiruchirappalli district, in the Indian state of Tamil Nadu. It is a gram panchayat (township) in Manachanallur taluk.

There is a 3-kilometre (1.9 mi) road connecting Omandur to Thinnanur in Tiruchi.

== Demographics ==
As of 2011 census, Omandur had a population of 2594 with 1308 males and 1286 females.
