= Tamil Valarchi Kazhagam =

- Founded: 1946
- Founder: T. S. Avinashilingam Chettiar, M.Mohammad Ismail and others.
- Headquarters: Chennai
- Key people: M. Rajendran (President)
- Website: tamilvk.org

Tamil Valarchi Kazhagam (Tamil Academy), is a non government Language organization established on 1946 in Madras Presidency by former education minister T. S. Avinashilingam Chettiar under the Registration of Societies Act. Academy is functioning from the Chepauk campus of the University of Madras since its inception.

== Administration ==
Since 2024 October 24, M. Rajendran is serving as the president of the academy, Krishna Chand Sodiya is the vice president and V. Jeyadevan is the treasurer. P. Chidambaram is the chairperson of the board of trustees which includes Nalli Kuppuswami Chetti, S. Ramakrishnan and few eminent personalities.

=== Former Presidents ===
Former presidents for the Organization are listed below.

1. Periyasaamy Thooran
2. Chidambaram Subramaniam 08-12-1982 to 10.03.1990
3. V. C. Kulandaiswamy 10.03.1990

== Publications ==
- Tamil Encyclopedia - 10 Volumes
- Children Encyclopedia - 10 Volumes
- Medicine Encyclopedia
