= Bikkina Veeraswami =

Indian politician and agriculturist

- Prime Minister: Jawaharlal Nehru

Minister of Forest (Madras Presidency)
- In office 18 June 1946 – 3 February 1947

Personal details
- Born: 1886 Tatipaka, East Godavari, Andhra Pradesh
- Died: 27 November 1970 (aged 83–84)
- Party: Indian National Congress
- Education: Licentiate in Agriculture From Madras College of Agriculture
- Occupation: Agriculturist; Politician

Bikkina Veeraswami (1886 – 27 November 1970) was an Indian politician who served as the Minister of Agriculture in the Madras Presidency during a critical period in Indian history.

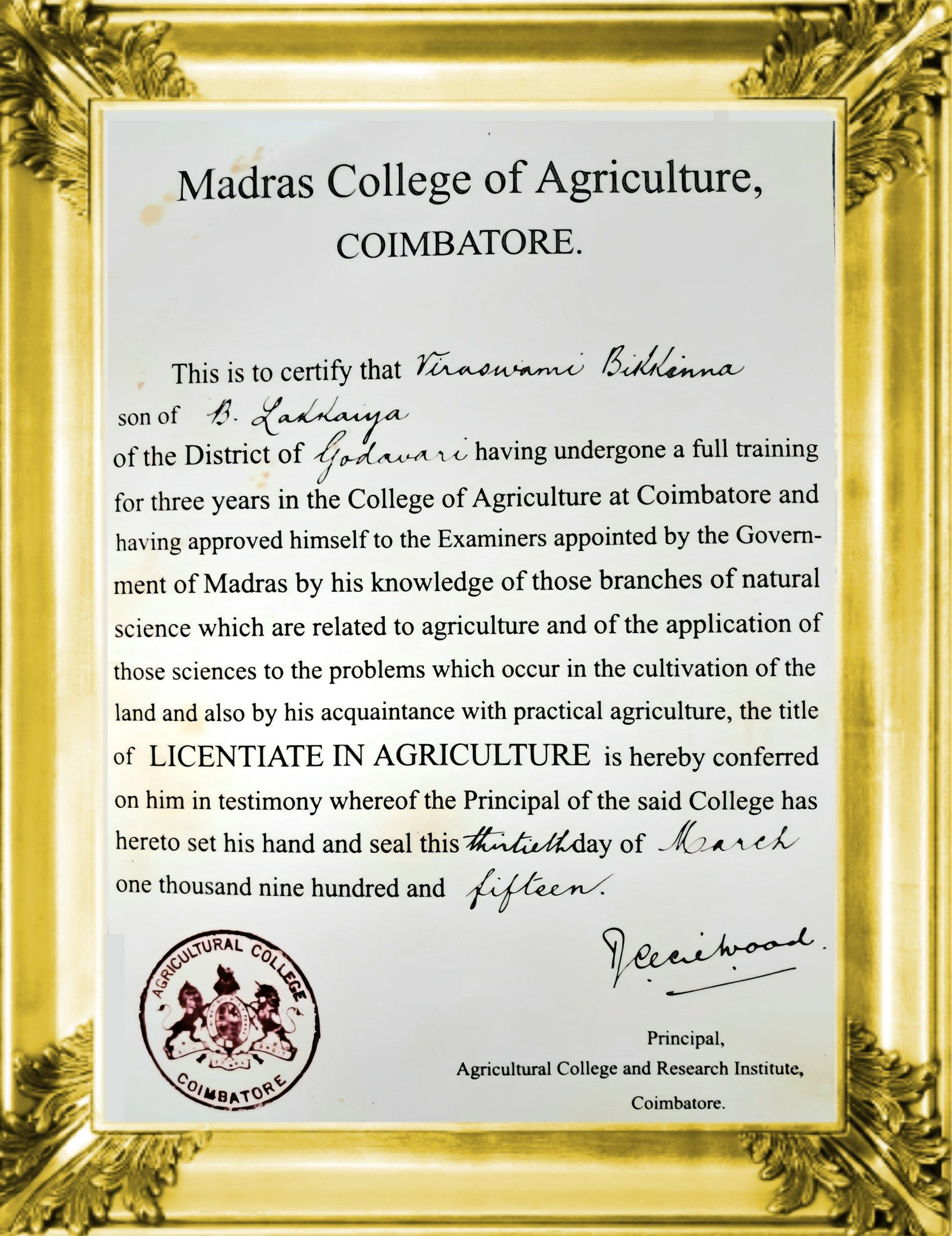
Bikkina Veeraswami (13.03.1915) Licentiate in Agriculture From Madras College of Agriculture

== Political career ==
Veeraswami ran in the 1946 Madras Presidency Legislative Assembly election. He became a Member of the Legislative Council representing East Godavari and was a member of the Indian National Congress party.

In 1946, Veeraswami assumed the role of Minister of Agriculture in the Madras Government.

He had previously served as a Minister of the composite Madras State and was a Member of the Legislative Council representing the East Godavari. Tamil Nadu Legislative Council paid tribute to him in their debates, as mentioned in "Tamil Nadu Legislative Council Debates Volume 88" in 1971. The Chairman informed the House of his demise, expressing regret over the loss of a former Minister and a member who had represented the East Godavari region in the Legislative Council.

== Death ==
Veeraswamy died on 27 November 1970 in his native village Tatipaka, Razole Taluk, East Godavari District.
