= K. Madhava Menon =

Kerala painter

K. Madhava Menon (20 June 1911 – 4 February 1984) was a painter from Kerala, India. Born in Kodungalloor in Thrissur District Menon had his training from Madras Theosophical Society. He also had training from Shantiniketan under renowned painters Nandalal Bose and Abanindranath Tagore. His paintings mostly used water colour and were particularly known for their naturalistic elements. He mostly paints from memory. He is known for his relationship with avians.

During an auction in 2016, his painting was sold by Christie's in the 'Lahiri collection: Indian and Himalayan art, ancient and modern'.

Madhava Menon died at Kodungallur on 4 February 1984.
