= Vemula Kurmayya =

Indian freedom fighter and politician

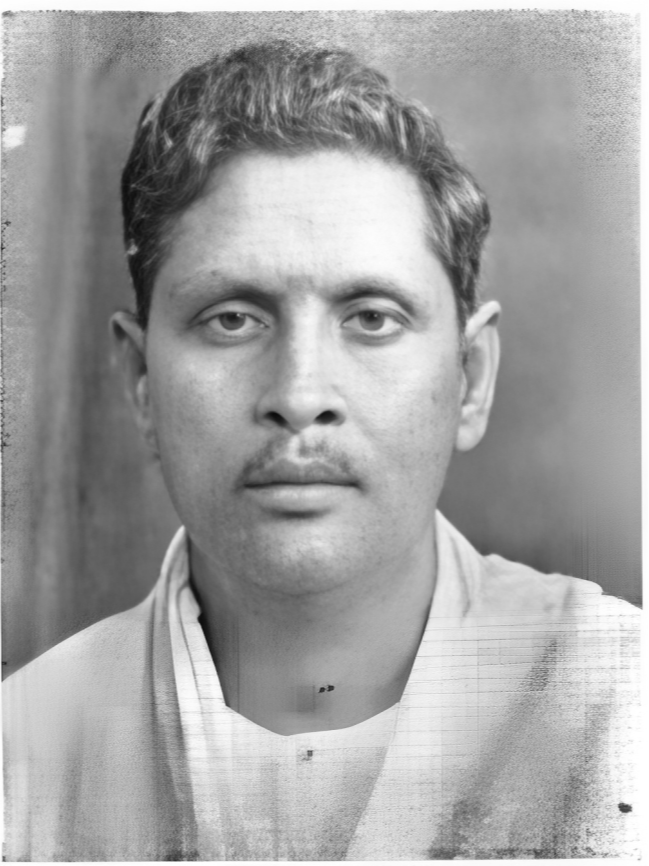

Member of the Andhra Pradesh Legislative Assembly
- In office 1967–1970
- Preceded by: Peta Bapayya
- Succeeded by: Kota Ramaiah
- Constituency: Tiruvur
- In office 1955–1962
- Preceded by: Gungi Rama Rao
- Succeeded by: Gungi Rama Rao
- Constituency: Gudivada

Minister for Rural Development, Madras
- In office 1947–1949
- Chief Minister: Omandur Ramaswamy Reddiar

Member of the Madras Legislative Assembly
- In office 1936–?
- Constituency: Bandar, General Rural (Scheduled Castes) Constituency

Personal details
- Born: 1903 Mallavaram, Gudivada Taluk, Krishna District, Andhra Pradesh, India
- Died: 1970
- Party: Indian National Congress
- Occupation: Freedom Fighter; Politician; Social Reformer

Vemula Kurmayya (1903 – 1970) was an Indian independence activist, Congress party leader, and social reformer from the Krishna district of Andhra Pradesh. He played a role in India's struggle for independence and worked for the upliftment of marginalized communities.

Vemula Kurmayya was born in 1903 in Mallavaram, a village in Krishna district, Andhra Pradesh. Started being involved in political activism during the Non-Cooperation Movement of 1921. he discontinued formal education and joined the Gandhi National School in Vijayawada.

Kurmayya became an apprentice in spinning and weaving at Sabarmati Ashram from 1925 to 1927.

During the Civil Disobedience Movement of 1930 and the Individual Satyagraha Movement of 1940, Kurmayya's active participation in these movements led to multiple imprisonments.

Vemula Kurmayya's contributions to the independence struggle led him into a leadership role within the Indian National Congress. He was elected four times to the Andhra Pradesh Legislative Assembly and emerged as a significant figure in both the State and Central Committee.

In 1962 Anshra Pradesh election he lost to Gungi Rama Rao from Gudivada constituency.
