= Pettai, Tirunelveli =

- Neighborhood
- Location within Tamil Nadu
- Coordinates: 08°43′18″N 77°39′35″E
- Country: India
- State: Tamil Nadu
- District: Tirunelveli
- City: Tirunelveli

Government
  - Type: Municipal Corporation
  - Body: Tirunelveli City Municipal Corporation
- Elevation: 54 m (177 ft)
- Time zone: UTC+5:30 (IST)
- PIN: 627004, 627010
- Vehicle registration: TN72

Pettai is an industrial suburban area in Tirunelveli. It is approximately 6 kilometers of downtown Tirunelveli along the Southern Railway line to Tenkasi. It is being administered by the Tirunelveli City Municipal Corporation.

== History ==
Pettai actually got its name from the Vandi Pettais (godowns with cart-parking facilities). These Vandi Pettais were dealing with few agriculture commodities such as coriander, and chilli. Pettai is a populous urban area with many small-scale industries.

When the Co-operative Spinning Mill was in operation, people from across Tamil Nadu flocked here for the employment in this mill. Most of them settled here.

== Demographics ==
At the 2001 census, Pettai had 26,060 inhabitants, with 13,434 males and 12,526 females.

== Economy ==
Pettai Industrial Estate is operated by SIDCO. The major products manufactured here are PVC pipes, tanks, cooking utensils, nails, mattresses, etc. TANSI is also operated inside this estate. Government ITI and MSME are also present.

Pettai Bazaar serves as a shopping hub for the nearby villages.

== Cityscape ==
=== Cuisine ===
Pettai is famous for evening snacks such as Vadai and Murukku. They are famous because they are fried in the oils produced at traditional oil mills here. Chekkadi had many chekku (traditional oil mills). It is also famous for Parotta stalls. Earlier only Pettai hotels served parottas during lunch along with rice.

=== Famous Person ===
Quide Millath. On his remembrance, the government hospital in has been renamed. The Cheranmahadevi road flows within Pettai is also named after him as Quaid e Millath Road.

== Educational Institutions ==
Though Pettai is situated near the Oxford of South India (Palayamkottai), it also has established educational institutions.

- Government ITI
- Kamarajar Higher Secondary School
- MDT Hindu College
- Rani Anna Girls' School
- St. Antony's High School

Apart from this, there are number of private schools serving for the Pettai Public.
