= Nadipudi =

- village
- Interactive map of Nadipudi
- Location in Andhra Pradesh, India Nadipudi (India)
- Coordinates: 16.6488°N 81.8340°E
- Country: India
- State: Andhra Pradesh
- District: West Godavari
- Mandal: Penugonda
- Elevation: 14 m (46 ft)

Population (2011)
  - Total: 3,342

Languages
  - Official: Telugu
- Time zone: UTC+5:30 (IST)
- PIN: 534320
- Telephone code: 08819
- Nearest town: Palakollu
- Lok Sabha constituency: Narasapuram
- Vidhan Sabha constituency: Achanta
- Climate: hot (Köppen)

Nadipudi is a panchayat village in Penugonda mandal in West Godavari district of Andhra Pradesh, India. Previously, it used to part of Narsapur Taluk. Ancestors of freedom fighter and politician Kala Venkata Rao are from this village. There is temple of Lord Subrahmanya, which very popular among people in that area. The etymology of the name Nadipudi is from Nadi-poodi (the river that filled up) as Nadi stands for river and pudi is filled in Telugu. The village is on the banks of Vashsta Godavari. Former congress MLC and former State President of A.P. Coopeartive Consumers Federation Nekkanti Venkata Janarthana Rao hailed from this village and film producer NVV Satyanarayana who made Telugu blockbusters like Adavai Ramudu with NTR and Kumar Raja with Krishna under Satya Chitra banner was his brother.

== Geography ==
Nadipudiis located at 16.6488°N 81.8340°E. It has an average elevation of 14 metres (46 ft). Nadipudi has its own railway station connecting major cities.
