= O. P. Ramaswamy Reddiyar =

Indian independence activist and politician (1895–1970)

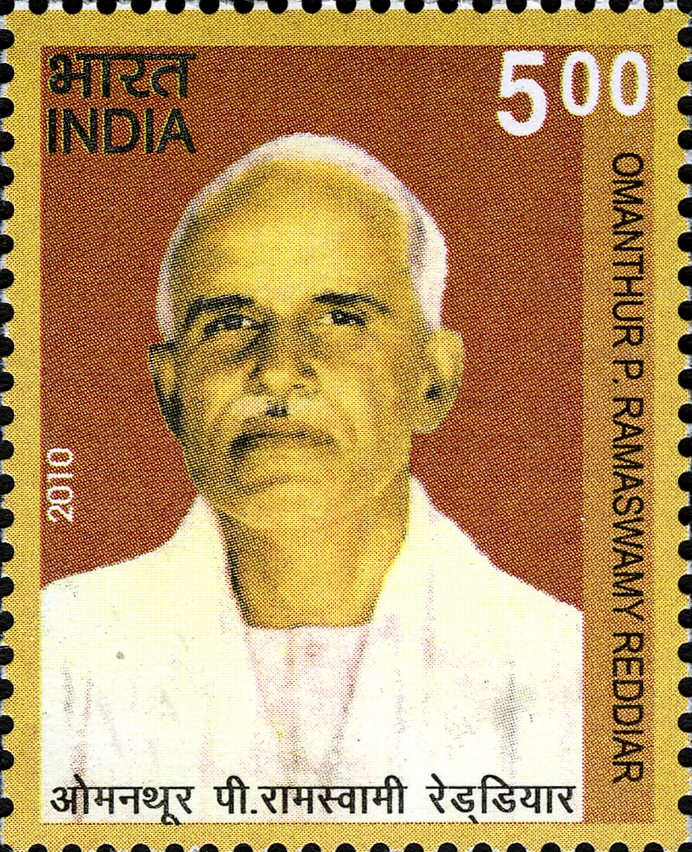
- Ramaswamy Reddiyar on a 2010 stamp of India

4th Premier of the Madras Presidency
- In office 23 March 1947 – 6 April 1949
- Preceded by: Tanguturi Prakasam
- Succeeded by: P. S. Kumaraswamy Raja

Personal details
- Born: Omandur Periyavalavu Ramasamy Reddiyar; 1 February 1895 Omandur, Madras Presidency, British India
- Died: 25 August 1970 (aged 75) Vadalur, Tamil Nadu, India
- Party: Indian National Congress
- Spouse: Singaratha Ammal

Omandur Periyavalavu Ramasamy Reddiyar (1 February 1895 – 25 August 1970) was an Indian independence activist and Indian National Congress politician who served as the Premier of Madras Presidency from 23 March 1947 to 6 April 1949.

== Early life ==
Omandur Ramaswamy Reddiyar was born on 1 February 1895 in the village of Omandur near Tindivanam in the South Arcot district of Madras Presidency. He belonged to a Reddiar family. He had his schooling at Walter Scudder school and entered the Indian independence movement at an early age.

Ramaswamy Reddiyar was a devotee of Vallalar.

== As Chief Minister ==
Ramaswamy Reddiyar became the Prime Minister or Premier of Madras on 23 March 1947 and was in power till 6 April 1949. During his tenure, the Madras Temple Entry Authorization Act 1947 was passed. This act was intended to give Dalits and other prohibited Hindus full and complete rights to enter Hindu temples. This was approved by the Governor on 11 May 1947 and passed as Madras Act 5 of 1947. The Devadasi Dedication Abolition Act of 1947 put an end to the devadasi system that was in vogue in many Hindu temples.

It was during his tenure that India achieved independence from the United Kingdom. Soon after independence and partition of India, there was a shortage of food grains, especially rice, in the province. In 1948, he ordered the purchase of a de Havilland Dove, the first aeroplane to be owned by the Government of Madras.

In 1948, when the Congress legislative party elections were held, Ramaswamy Reddiyar's candidature was opposed by Tanguturi Prakasam. However, Reddiyar won with the support of K. Kamaraj. However, the Congress leaders were disgruntled with Reddiyar as he did not allow them special privileges. So, during the 1949 Congress Legislative Party elections, Kamaraj supported P. S. Kumaraswamy Raja against Ramaswamy Reddiyar. Though Ramaswamy Reddiyar was supported by C. Rajagopalachari, P. Subbarayan and T. Prakasam, he lost the vote and stepped down as Prime Minister.

Minister	Portfolio
O. P. Ramaswami Reddiyar	Prime Minister, Public, Hindu religious endowments and Harijan uplift
M. Bhaktavatsalam	Public works and Planning
P. Subbarayan	Home and Legal (Law and Order)
T. S. S. Rajan	Food, Motor transport and Labour
T. S. Avinashilingam	Education
Daniel Thomas	Prohibition, Excise, Registration and Housing
Vemula Kurmayya	Harijan uplift, Fisheries and Rural development
H. Sitarama Reddi	Industries and Information
K. Chandramouli	Local administration and Co-operative
K. Madhava Menon	Agriculture and Forest
Kala Venkata Rao	Revenue
A. B. Shetty	Public health
S. Gurubatham	Khadi, Firka development and Cottage industries

Changes

Subbarayan resigned on 5 April 1948, Daniel Thomas on 15 June 1948 and Kala Venkata Rao on 24 January 1949.

== Later years ==
When his Premiership of Madras Presidency came to an end in April 1949, Ramaswamy Reddiyar was elected to the Constituent Assembly of India. The complex of buildings that houses the Tamil Nadu Legislative Assembly has been named after him. A commemorative postage stamp on him was released on 25 August 2010.

== Works ==
- O. P. Ramaswamy Reddiyar (1948). Agrarian reforms and parity economy. Economic Adviser to the Government of Madras.
- O. P. Ramaswamy Reddiyar (1949). Address delivered on the occasion of opening the 19th annual conference on Land Mortgage Banks held on 13th March 1949.

Preceded by Tanguturi Prakasam	Prime Minister of Madras Presidency; 23 March 1947 – 6 April 1949	Succeeded by P. S. Kumaraswamy Raja
