= C. N. Muthuranga Mudaliar =

Politician

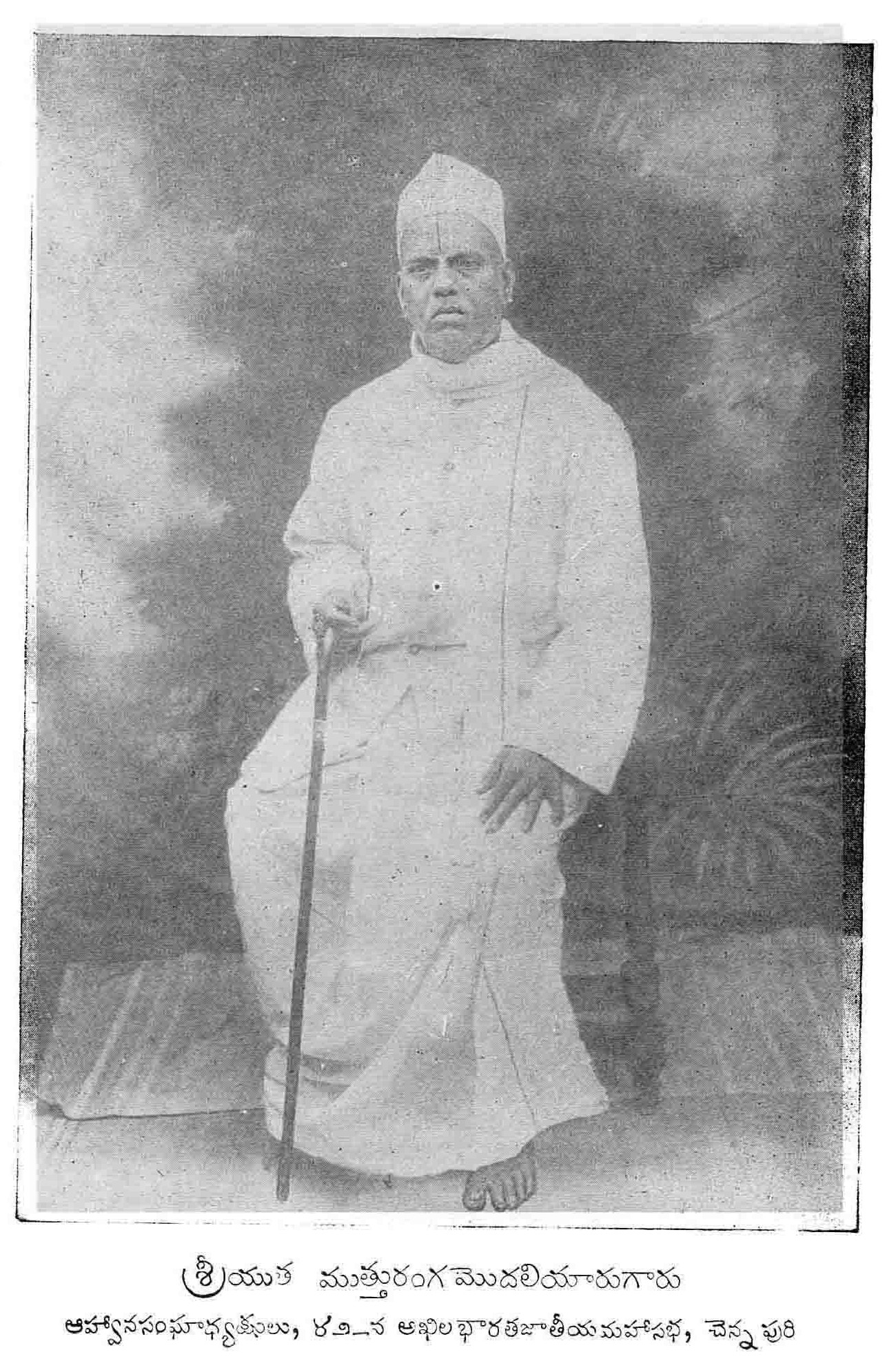
C. N. Muthuranga Mudaliar was the president of Invitation committee of 42nd All India Congress Committee Meet at Chennai

C. N. Muthuranga Mudaliar (c. 1888 - d. 2 February 1949) was an Indian politician and Indian independence activist who served as a member of the Central Legislative Assembly He was elected President of the Tamil Nadu Congress on 16 January 1938. Mudaliar was the paternal uncle of Indian politician, M. Bhaktavatsalam.

== Sources ==
- M. Gopalakrishnan (2000). Tamil Nadu state: Kancheepuram and Tiruvallur districts (erstwhile Chengalpattu district). Directory of Stationery and Printing. p. 183.
- Who's who of freedom fighters, Tamil Nadu. 1973. p. 13.
