= Saraswati (disambiguation) =

Saraswati, or Sarasvati, is a Hindu goddess.

Saraswati, Saraswathi, or Sarasvati may also refer to:

== River ==
- Saraswati River, a river mentioned in ancient Indian texts
  - Ghaggar-Hakra River, the possible remains of the Sarasvati River in India and Pakistan
  - Saraswati River (Madhya Pradesh), India
  - Saraswati River (Uttarakhand), India
  - Saraswati River (Gujarat), India
  - Saraswati River (West Bengal), India
  - Saraswati Flumen on Titan

== People ==
- Saraswat Brahmin, Brahmin sub-caste of India who claim an origin from settlements near the Sarasvati river

=== Given name ===
- K. Saraswathi Amma
- Saraswati Devi (music director) (1912–1980), Indian director of music and score composer
- Saraswati Devi (scholar), Telugu scholar and poet
- Sarada (actress), Indian actress, born Saraswati Devi
- Saraswati Devi (veena player) (c. 1493 – 1589), daughter of Tansen
- Saraswathi Rajamani
- Saraswati Saha, an Indian sprinter
- Saraswati Samman
- Saraswathi Subbiah
- Saraswati Vidyardhi, an Indian singer

=== Surname ===
- Chinmayananda Saraswati
- C. R. Saraswathi
- Jayendra Saraswathi
- Isyana Sarasvati (born 1993), Indonesian singer
- Rahayu Saraswati (born 1986), Indonesian politician
- Vijayendra Saraswati Swamigal

== Other uses ==
- Sarasvati Productions, a Canadian theatre company
- Saraswati Supercluster, an astronomical object
- Saraswati veena, a musical instrument
- Saraswati (sculpture), an outdoor sculpture
- Saraswati (TV series), an Indian Marathi language television series
- Saraswati (magazine), the first Hindi monthly magazine
- S. Saraswathi, 2026 Indian film

== See also ==
- Saraswatichandra (disambiguation)
- Saraswoti (disambiguation)
- Harahvaiti (disambiguation), Iranic equivalent
