= 1st Pondicherry Representative Assembly =

1st Representative Assembly of Pondicherry
←	2nd Representative Assembly of French India	2nd Pondicherry Representative Assembly	→

Overview
- Legislative body: Pondicherry Representative Assembly
- Term: 17 August 1955 – 28 October 1958
- Election: 1955 Pondicherry Representative Assembly election
- Government: Indian National Congress
- Opposition: People's Front
- Members: 39

After the de facto merger on 1 November 1954 and before the legal integration with the Indian Union on 16 August 1962, general elections were held in 1955 and 1959. In January 1955, The Indian union government renamed the French settlements in India as State of Pondicherry by passing an order. The previous assembly that was elected during French rule was dissolved on 13 June 1955 and the first general elections to the Pondicherry Representative Assembly were held in next month from 18 to 23 July for 39 constituencies. The election were held on the basis of adult franchise under the State of Pondicherry (Representation of the People French: Représentation du peuple) Order, 1955 which prescribed the rules and regulations for the conduct of elections, more or less on the pattern adopted in the Indian Union.

== Important members ==
- President: (Note: Equivalent to Speaker in contemporary Indian assemblies)
  - R.L. Purushothama Reddiar from 17 August 1955 to 23 April 1956 (Note: He resigned from Congress party. He along with four other dissidents joined the opposition. After he left the assembly by declaring sine die along with his dissidents, the deputy speaker was asked to act as speaker and Purushothama Reddiar got removed from speaker post unanimously.)
  - Kamichetty Sri Parassourama Varaprassada Rao Naidu from 23 April 1956 to 24 October 1958
- Vice-President: (Note: Equivalent to Deputy Speaker in contemporary Indian assemblies)
  - Kamichetty Sri Parassourama Varaprassada Rao Naidu from 1954 to April 1956
- Leader of the House: (Note: Then referred as Chief counsellor)
  - Maurice Pakkiriswamy Pillai from 17 August 1955 to 13 January 1956
  - Édouard Goubert from 20 April 1956 to 24 October 1958
- Leader of opposition:
  - V. Subbiah from 17 August 1955 to 24 October 1958

== Members of the First Pondicherry Representative Assembly as of 1956 ==
Party Name	Members
Indian National Congress	22
People's Front	12
Independents	5

Keys: Congress (22) People's Front (P.F.) (12) Independent (5)

Members of the First Pondicherry Representative Assembly
S. No	Name	Constituency	Commune	Region	Party
1	Annousamy	Ariankuppam	Ariancoupom	Pondicherry	P.F.
2	Arul Raj	Muthialpet	Pondicherry	Pondicherry	P.F.
3	Arunachalam	Darbaranyeswarar Koil	Tirnoular	Karikal	Congress
4	Asappu Bairavasamy	Oulgaret Town	Oulgaret	Pondicherry	P.F.
5	Barathidasan	Cassicade	Pondicherry	Pondicherry	Congress (Note: i.e. Won on P.F. ticket, but, among three who joined Congress after elections)
6	C. E. Barathan	Mahe Town	Mahe	Mahe	Congress
7	Chandrasekhara Chettiar	Archivak–Tavalacoupom	Ariancoupom	Pondicherry	Congress
8	D.Rathinasabapathy Pillai	Néravy Commune	Néravy	Karikal	Congress
9	Édouard Goubert	Bahour	Bahour	Pondicherry	Congress
10	Evariste Dessame	Karikal South	Karikal	Karikal	P.F.
11	Govindaraju	Nellitope Town	Modéliarpeth	Pondicherry	P.F.
12	Joseph Latour	Ouppalaom	Pondicherry	Pondicherry	P.F.
13	K. Sheikh Dawood Maricar	Karikal Town North	Karikal	Karikal	Congress
14	K.S.V. Prasadarao Naidu	Yanam (Note: i.e. Kanakalpeta constituency)	Yanaon	Yanam	Congress
15	Louis Savarih	Villenour Town	Villenour	Pondicherry	Ind.
16	M.M.Hussein	Fifth Bussy Street	Pondicherry	Pondicherry	P.F.
17	Mohamed Yusoof	Karikal Central	Karikal	Karikal	Ind.
18	Padmanabhan	Palloor	Mahé	Mahe	Ind.
19	Murugaswamy Clemanso	Couroussou Coupom	Pondicherry	Pondicherry	P.F.
20	N. Sethuraman Chettiar	Rajbhavan	Pondicherry	Pondicherry	Ind.
21	N. Ranganathan	Saram and Lawspet	Oulgaret	Pondicherry	P.F.
22	Pakkir Mohammed	Oussoudou	Villenour	Pondicherry	P.F.
23	Shanmugam	Nedungadu	Neduncadou	Karikal	P.F.
24	Ramalingam	Calapet	Oulgaret	Pondicherry	Congress
25	R.L. Purushottam Reddiar	Kuruvinattam-Kariambuttur	Bahour	Pondicherry	Congress
26	S. Dakshinamoorthy Mudaliar	Thirumalarayanpattinam South	Grand Aldée	Karikal	Congress
27	Thandapani Kounder	Mannadipet Town	Tiroubouvané	Pondicherry	Congress
28	Thiagaraja Naicker	Embaralam-Kalamandapam	Nettapacom	Pondicherry	Congress
29	Thirukamu Reddi	Sellipet-Souttoukeny	Tiroubouvané	Pondicherry	Congress
30	T. Srinivasa Pillai	Thirumeni Alagar	Cotchéry	Karikal	Congress
31	U. Rangaswamy Pillai	Thirumalayapattinam North	Grand Aldée	Karikal	Congress
32	Venkatasubba Reddiar	Nettapakkam Town	Nettapacom	Pondicherry	Congress
33	V.N.Purushottaman	Pandakkal	Mahe	Mahe	Ind.
34	V.Narayanaswamy	Reddiarpalayam Town	Oulgaret	Pondicherry	P.F.
35	V.Ramalingam Pillai	Badrakaliamman Kovil	Tirnoular	Karikal	Congress
36	V.Ramaswamy Pillai	Kottuchery-Mathakovil	Cotchéry	Karikal	Congress
37	V. Subbiah	Murugapakkam	Modéliarpeth	Pondicherry	P.F.
38	Y.Jagannadha Rao	Yanam (Note: i.e. Adi Andhrapeta constituency)	Yanaon	Yanam	Congress
39	M. Pakkiriswamy Pillai^{†} (Note: i.e. The seat fell vacant after Pakkiriswamy Pillai's death in January 1956.)	Karikovil Pathan	Karikal	Congress	

^{†} After the Death of Pakkiriswamy Pillai, his seat fell vacant in Karaikkal in 1956. Later a by election was conducted and P. Shanmugam got elected as the sixth councillor from Karaikkal. Shanmugam was an erstwhile People's Front member from Nedungadu constituency.

== Council of ministers of Goubert(1956-1958) ==
After death of Pakkirisamy a Council of ministers was formed under leadership of Edouard Goubert. Lt Governor during that time was Kewal Singh. The speaker of assembly was initially A. S. Gangeyan and was replaced by Kamichetty Parasuram.

Minister	Portfolio
Édouard Goubert; Chief counsellor	N.A.
Chandrasekhara Chettiar	N.A.
C. E. Barathan	N.A.
Mohammad Yussoof	N.A.
S. Dakshinamoorthy Mudaliar	N.A.
Thiagaraja Naicker	N.A.

Later Shanmugam related Barathan in the council of ministers (also referred as advisory council to the commissioner) and the composition was as follows:

Minister	Portfolio
Édouard Goubert; Chief counsellor	Public Works, Industries and Labour
Chandrasekhara Chettiar	Port, Fisheries, Co-operation, Electricity
Shanumugam	Agriculture, Rural Development etc.
Mohammad Yussoof	Revenue, Veterinary & Information
S. Dakshinamoorthy Mudaliar	N.A.
Thiagaraja Naicker	Local Administration, Transport & Information

== Important proceedings ==
- On 12 August 1955, the assembly passed a resolution demanding immediate de jure transfer of the state from France to Indian Union. This resolution was passed with huge majority. However, because of the Algerian war, the de jure transfer did not take place until August 1962.
- On 26 August 1955, the assembly demanded that the State of Pondicherry be kept a separate state within the Indian Union. The demand was accepted later and Puducherry is a union territory comprising the French settlements of Puducherry, Karaikkal, Mahe and Yanam.

== Instability ==
Untimely death of the chief counsellor Pakkirisamy Pillai in January 1956 started a saga of infighting among the members of Congress Party.

=== 1956 crisis ===
First instance of serious infighting arouse during April 1956 which continued for four months and ended after election of Kamisetty Parasuram as the new speaker of the assembly. Congress assembly legislative party was divided about the successor of Pakkirisamy Pillai as chief counsellor (a post equivalent of chief minister in Indian state assemblies). The major faction was headed Goubert and the minor faction was led by Purushothama Reddiar who had four members supporting his cause.

=== Election of Goubert as Chief counsellor ===
On 20 April 1956 Goubert was elected unanimously when the Puroshathama Reddiar's faction abstained from that meeting. This issue became a scandal that attracted the attention of then Indian prime minister Nehru and Madras chief minister Kamaraj. Nehru has mentioned about it in his works. After Late Pakkirisamy's seat from Karaikal was vacant, the strength of Goubert's group got reduced from 18 to 19. The Congress party position in the Assembly was as follows: Congress-18, People's Front-15, Congress dissidents led by Reddiar's faction-5. Thus, without support of Reddiar's faction the Goubert's government could not survive as it falls below the halfway mark of 20 in a house of 39.

=== Removal of Purushothama Reddiar as Speaker ===
On 23 April Purushothama Reddiar resigned from Congress party. He along with four other dissidents joined the opposition. After he left the assembly by declaring sine die along with his dissidents, the deputy speaker Kamichetty Parasuram was asked to act as speaker and Purushothama Reddiar got removed from speaker post unanimously in an unceremonious way.

The speaker election was necessitated as Puroshottama Reddiar was about to retire as speaker as he along with four dissidents joined the opposition. In April, the dissident group moved away from Congress and voted along People's Front (i.e. the opposition party). Kamisetty Parasuram got elected with support of all the 26 members of the Congress party.

=== 1958 crisis ===
In another instance, the rivalry between two congress factions peaked in August 1958 and this time it was much severe. The former faction is headed by E. Goubert, the leader of the house and Rangaswami Pillai, leader of the dissident group. The dissidents had a strength of 10 members. This rift got deepened when the dissidents joined the Communist-backed People's Front to elect the Assembly's office bearers (i.e. ministers). Then president of INC, U. N. Dhebar tried to broker peace between the two rival groups in Delhi on 31 August 1958. The main bone of contention between the two factions was over the formation of Council of six ministers. The Congress president had suggested Rangaswami and another dissident in his group, Arul Raj that the disciplinary action taken against them shall be withdrawn, provided some compromise is brought between the two faction to bring back unity. Then chief minister of Madras, K. Kamaraj was suggested to intervene to sort out this issue. But the deadlock remained leading to the intervention of the commissioner.

== Early dissolution ==
The government led by Congress was not stable as the ruling party was ridden with personal strifes and factions. Finally, the Government of India had to intervene finally by dissolving the Assembly following the instability caused by the change of party affiliation of members. Then, the Chief Commissioner took over the administration in October 1958. Later, after nine months, second general elections were held to the Pondicherry Representative Assembly in 1959.

== See also ==
- Government of Puducherry
- List of chief ministers of Puducherry
- List of lieutenant governors of Puducherry
- Puducherry Legislative Assembly
- Pondicherry Representative Assembly
- 1955 Pondicherry Representative Assembly election
- 1959 Pondicherry Representative Assembly election
