= 1955 Pondicherry Representative Assembly election =

Indian union territory election

- 18 July 1955

All 39 seats to the Puducherry Representative Assembly 20 seats needed for a majority
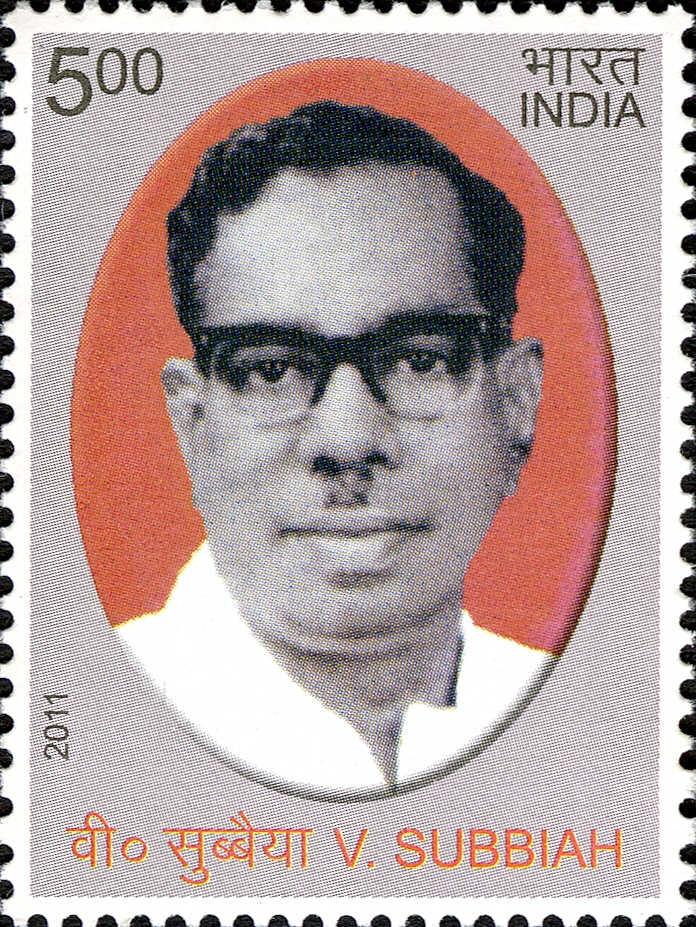
	First party	Second party
	INC
Leader	Paquirissamy-Poullé	V. Subbiah
Party	INC	People's Front
Leader's seat	Karikovil Pathan	Murungapakkam
Seats won	20	16
Percentage	37.2	35
Leader of Assembly before election
Balasupramanien
INC
Elected Leader of Assembly
Maurice Paquirissamypoullé
INC

After the de facto merger on 1 November 1954 and before the legal integration with the Indian Union on 16 August 1962, general elections were held in 1955 and 1959. So. the first general elections to the Pondicherry Representative Assembly (French: Assemblée représentative de Pondichéry) along with 16 municipal councils were held in 1955 from 18 to 23 July for 39 constituencies to constitute First Pondicherry Representative Assembly (French: Première Assemblée représentative de Pondichéry). The election were held on the basis of adult franchise under the State of Pondicherry (Representation of the People: French: Représentation du peuple) Order, 1955 which prescribed the rules and regulations for the conduct of elections, more or less on the pattern adopted in the Indian Union. The elections were conducted under supervision of the Election commissioner Mr. Sukumar Sen and heavy polling was reported during the elections.

== Results ==
The results of 1955 elections are

Parties and Coalitions	Won	Votes	Votes %
Indian National Congress	20	53,682	37.2%
People's Front	16	51,015	35.0%
Independents	3	37,926	27.0%

Congress barely secured a majority of 20 seats out of 39 these seats. Congress won 9 out of 12 from Karaikal, 8 out of 22 from Pondicherry, 1 out of 3 from Mahe and 2 out of 2 from Yanam. However, In Yanam, both seats won in an uncontested manner. In Pondicherry, the Congress did not fare well. The Congress did not secure seats in Pondicherry city and the surrounding areas. All the 8 seats in Pondicherry that were won by Congress came from the liberated areas of Nettapakkam, Mannadipet (Tiroubouvané) and Bahour communes. People's Front (Communist) (Makkaḷ Munnaṇi (Tamil:மக்கள் முன்னணி)) won 13 seats out of 22 from Pondicherry and 3 seats out of 12 seats from Karaikal. However, three members who won on People's Front ticket joined Congress later.

== Members of the 1955 Pondicherry Representative Assembly ==
Members of the first Pondicherry Representative Assembly
S. No	Name	Constituency	Region	Party
1	Annousamy	Ariankuppam	Pondicherry	P.F. (Note: i.e. People's Front)
2	Arun	Muthialpet	Pondicherry	P.F.
3	Arunachalam	Darbaranyeswarar Koil	Karikal	Congress
4	Ravi	Oulgaret Town	Pondicherry	P.F.
5	Barathidasan	Cassicade	Pondicherry	P.F. (Note: i.e. Won on P.F. ticket, but, among three who joined Congress after elections)
6	C. E. Barathan	Mahe Town	Mahe	Congress
7	Chandrasekhara Chettiar	Archivak–Tavalacoupom	Pondicherry	Congress
8	D.Rathinasabapathy Pillai	Neravy Commune	Karikal	Congress
9	Édouard Goubert	Bahour	Pondicherry	Congress
10	Evariste Dessame	Karikal South	Karikal	P.F.
11	Govindaraju	Nellitope Town	Pondicherry	P.F.
12	Joseph Latour	Ouppalaom	Pondicherry	P.F.
13	K. Sheikh Dawood Maricar	Karikal Town North	Karikal	Congress
14	K.S.V. Prasadarao Naidu (Note: i.e. Elected uncontested)	Yanam (Note: i.e. Kanakalpeta constituency)	Yanam	Congress
15	Louis Savarih	Villenour Town	Pondicherry	Ind. (Note: i.e. Independent)
16	M.M.Hussein	Fifth Bussy Street	Pondicherry	P.F.
17	Mohamed Yusoof	Karikal Central	Karikal	Ind.
18	Padmanabhan	Palloor	Mahe	Ind.
19	Murugaswamy Clemanso	Couroussou Coupom	Pondicherry	P.F.
20	N. Sethuraman Chettiar	Rajbhavan	Pondicherry	Ind.
21	N. Ranganathan	Saram and Lawspet	Pondicherry	P.F.
22	Pakkir Mohammed	Oussoudou	Pondicherry	P.F.
23	P. Shanmugam	Nedungadu	Karikal	P.F.
24	Ramalingam	Calapet	Pondicherry	Congress
25	R.L. Purushottam Reddiar	Kuruvinattam-Kariambuttur	Pondicherry	Congress
26	S. Dakshinamoorthy Mudaliar	Thirumalarayanpattinam South	Karikal	Congress
27	Thandapani Kounder	Mannadipet Town	Pondicherry	Congress
28	Thiagaraja Naicker	Embaralam-Kalamandapam	Pondicherry	Congress
29	Thirukamu Reddi	Sellipet-Souttoukeny	Pondicherry	Congress
30	T. Srinivasa Pillai	Thirumeni Alagar	Karikal	Congress
31	U. Rangaswamy Pillai	Thirumalayapattinam North	Karikal	Congress
32	Venkatasubba Reddiar	Nettapakkam Town	Pondicherry	Congress
33	V.N.Purushottamari	Pandakkal	Mahe	Ind.
34	V.Narayanaswamy	Reddiarpalayam Town	Pondicherry	P.F.
35	V.Ramalingam Pillai	Badrakaliamman	Karikal	Congress
36	V.Ramaswamy Pillai	Kottuchery-Mathakovil	Karikal	Congress
37	V. Subbiah	Murugapakkam	Pondicherry	Congress
38	Y. Jagannadha Rao (Note: i.e. Elected uncontested)	Yanam (Note: i.e. Adi Andhrapeta constituency)	Yanam	Congress
39	M. Pakkiriswamy Pillai^{†} (Note: i.e. The seat fell vacant after Pakkiriswamy Pillai's death in January 1956.)	Karikovil Pathan	Karikal	Congress

^{†} After the Death of Pakkiriswamy Pillai, his seat fell vacant in Karaikkal in 1956. Later a by election was conducted and P. Shanmugam got elected as the sixth councillor from Karaikkal. Shanmugam was an erstwhile People's Front member from Nedungadu constituency.

== Government formation ==
On 9 August 1955 Then chief commissioner of Pondicherry, Mr. Kewal Singh also informed the leaders of the both Congress and People's Frony parties that unlike his predecessors during French rule, he would refrain from using his powers to nominate half of the six-membered Government-in-council (equivalent to council of ministries in Indian state assemblies). He assured that the assembly members can elect all the six members.

On 12 August 1955, chief commissioner then invited the Congress led by Maurice Pakkirisami Pillai for the formation of government. Thus, the Congress with the support of independents was able to form a Government. The chief opposition party was the Communist (i.e. People's Front) with 12 seats.

On 26 August 1955, putting into rest any speculations about merger with neighbouring states, the first Pondicherry Representative Assembly demanded that Pondicherry should remain as a separate state within India.

== Cabinet ==
Initially, Maurice Pakkiriswamy Pillai led the Pondicherry Representative Assembly from 17 August 1955 until his death in January 1956. Then, a five-member new cabinet was formed and led by Édouard Goubert. It had Eduard Goubert, Chandrasekhara Chettiar, Mohammed Yusoof, S. Dakshinamoorthy Mudaliar and Thiagraja Naicker.

== Aftermath ==
However, the government was not stable. There were frequent crossings of the floor by the Legislators, and the ruling party was ridden with personal strifes and factions. The Government of India had to intervene finally by dissolving the Assembly and the Chief Commissioner, L.R.S. Singh, took over the administration on 28 October 1958. Later, after nine months, elections were held in 1959.

== See also ==
- Puducherry Legislative Assembly
- 1946 French India Representative Assembly election
- 1951 French India Representative Assembly election
- 1959 Pondicherry Representative Assembly election
