= Rajamani =

Rajamani is a surname and given name. People associated with the name include:

- Lavanya Rajamani
- Saraswathi Rajamani
- Achu Rajamani
- Rajamani Velraj
