= Kanh River =

Kanh river
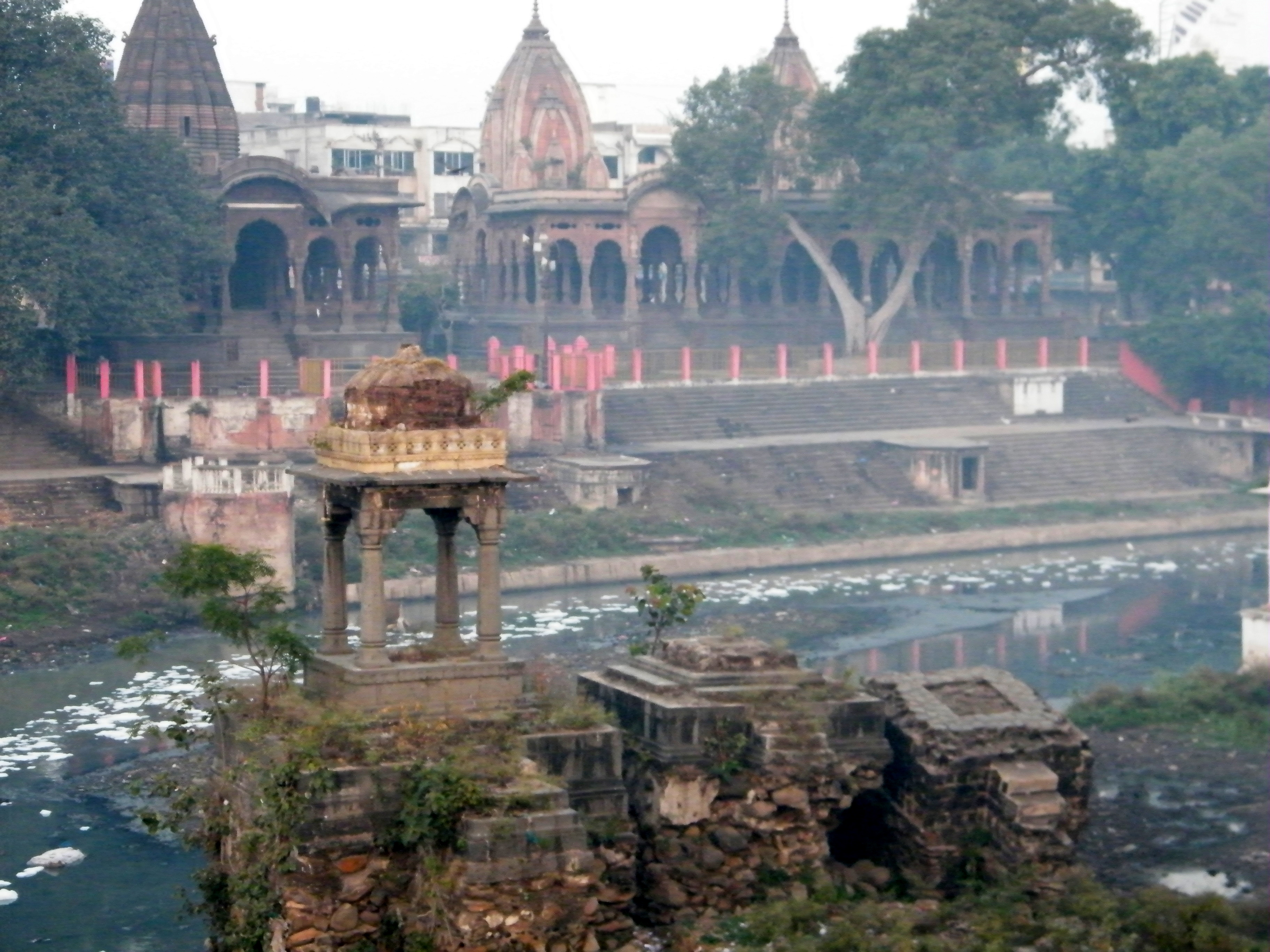
- The polluted Kanh river in Indore, 2009.
- Native name: Kanh river (Sanskrit)

Location
- Country: India
- State: Madhya Pradesh
- Cities: Indore

Physical characteristics
- Source
  - location: Indore, India
- Mouth: Saraswati river
  - location: Indore, India
  - coordinates: 22°43′07″N 75°51′31″E
- Length: 21 km (13 mi)

The Kanh is a river flowing through Indore, the largest city in the Indian state of Madhya Pradesh. The river started carrying sewage in the early 1990s. Several attempts have been made to clean the river, yet it remains polluted.

The river, along with the Saraswati River, is a part of the Smart City Indore project, and a riverfront spanning 3.9 kilometres has already been developed along the river. Both the rivers are being rejuvenated under the Smart Cities Mission.

== Etymology ==
The name Kanh is a cognate of Kanha, a major hindu deity, acquired after schwa deletion.

Corruptions of the name include Kahn and Khan.

== Pollution and environmental concerns ==
Kanh has faced massive pollution due to the flow of sewage from industries. As an additional load, the household drainage is also dumped into the Kanh without any purification or cleaning.

== Rejuvenation ==
In 2015, the Indian government announced the Smart Cities Mission. Indore successfully qualified in its Phase-1, and it ranked eleventh in the list released by Union Minister Venkaiah Naidu (MoUD), becoming one of the first twenty cities to be developed as a 'Smart City'. An amount of Rs 39 crores had been spent till 2020 on the Kanh and Saraswati riverfront development, marking the completion of five out of eight stages of the riverfront's development.

In 2023 the Union government sanctioned Rs. 511.15 Crore for the cleaning of the Kanh and Saraswati rivers, under the 'Namami Gange Programme’. Constructions undertaken using these funds are expected to be completed in the next two years.

== Course ==
Kanh rises from the Kakri Bardi hills which is also the source of the Shipra River. It later joins Saraswati, which further joins Shipra, then Chambal, then Yamuna and finally into the Ganga river.

== See also ==
- Fair river sharing
- List of rivers by discharge
- List of rivers by length
- List of rivers of India
