= Paul Bluysen =

French journalist and politician

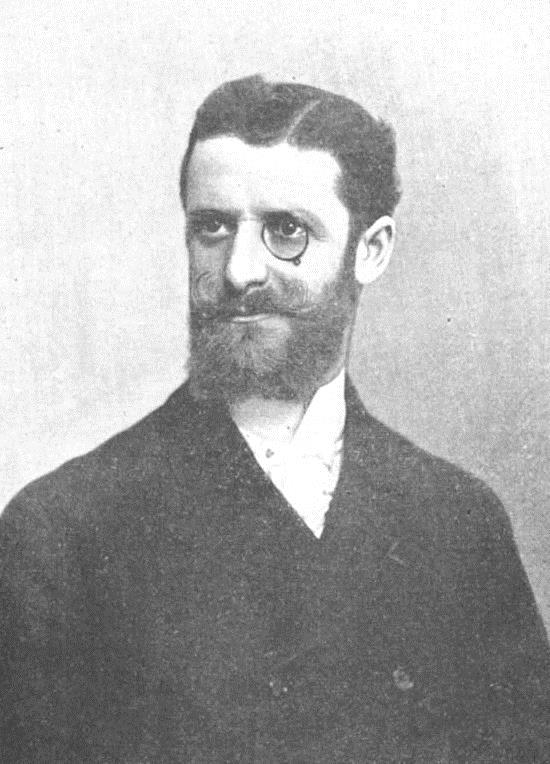
- Bluysen in 1901

Deputy of French India
- In office 24 April 1910 – 31 May 1924

Senator of French India
- In office 1 January 1924 – 1 January 1928
- Preceded by: Henri Gaebele
- Succeeded by: Eugène Le Moignic

Personal details
- Born: 10 April 1861 Paris, France
- Died: 10 September 1928 (aged 67) Le Coudray-Montceaux, Yvelines.
- Occupation: Journalist, politician
- Pseudonyms: Luc Olivier; Henri Thellier

Paul Luc Olivier Bluysen (10 April 1861 – 10 September 1928) was a French journalist and politician. He was deputy and then senator for French India from 1910 to 1928.

== Early years ==
Paul Bluysen was born on 10 April 1861 in Paris. His family was connected to the oldest families in Pondicherry. He was educated in Juilly, then at the Lycée Condorcet and the Collège Rollin in Paris.

== Journalist ==
In 1880 Bluysen founded a printing shop and published the Abeille de Seine-et-Oise. He was editor in chief of the journal. In 1883 he was director of the review Les arts graphiques. In 1885 he joined La République française, where he became editor in chief. In 1888 he published Huit jours à Copenhague, and in 1890 published Paris à l'exposition de 1889. From 1893 he was editorial secretary of the Journal des débats. He also contributed to Le Voltaire. He sometimes signed his articles with the pseudonyms "Luc Olivier" or "Henri Thellier".

On 2 March 1895 Alfred Le Chatelier fought a duel at the Moulin Rouge restaurant in Neuilly with Harry Alis (Léon Hippolyte Percher), editor of the Journal des débats. The duel was fought with swords over a charge that Le Châtelier had made that Alis might be compromised with Belgian interests in Africa. Alis had previously accused Le Châtelier of seeking personal gain in the Congo. Colonel Baudot and Commandant de Castelli acted for Chatelier, while Paul Bluysen and André Hallays^{(fr)}, both of the Journal des débats, acted for Percher. The duel proved fatal to Alis.

Bluysen was helpful to many French people in India, and in 1898 was persuaded to run for election as deputy for Pondicherry. He was defeated by the journalist Louis Henrique-Duluc^{(fr)}. That year he published Félix Faure intime, a lively but shallow work about Félix Faure, then President of France. In 1901 Bluysen left the Journal des Débats and became owner and director of the Correspondance républicaine libérale. On 27 April 1902 he again tried for election as deputy for Pondicherry, but was decisively beaten by Henrique-Duluc. In 1906 he became director of the Annuaire de la presse française et étrangère et du monde politique. At this time he was elected syndic of the Paris press and was made a Knight of the Legion of Honour.

== Deputy ==
Bluysen made another attempt in the legislative elections of 24 April 1910 for French India. He promised improved education, more irrigation projects and strict neutrality between the religions. At that time the candidates, few of whom had visited India, paid local agents to ensure they were elected, and the agents hired gangs of hooligans to control the polls. In 1910 the violence was even worse than usual. Acting governor Ernest Fernand Lévecque sent a telegram to the Colonial Ministry on 24 April 1910 giving the first results. He reported, "Yesterday many incidents common to Pondicherry and Mudaliarpet; scuffles, blows, violent disputes around ballot-boxes, some wounded; exchange of blows, a few mortal wounds." The Pondicherry mayor Henri Gaebele was blamed for the violence. Levecque announced the final results on 4 May 1910: Bluysen = 20,580 votes, Lemaire = 17,453.

In the Chamber of Deputies Bluysen sat with the Radical and Radical Socialist group, and specialized in foreign affairs. He was a member of the Committee on External Affairs, Protectorates and Colonies. He was rapporteur on the proposed Statute of Colonial Banks in 1911 and on Works to be Undertaken in French India in 1912. He presented a report on the conviction of the deputy Hégésippe Légitimus. He participated in the debate on the budget for education in Asia and Oceania. In 1912 he challenged the government of Raymond Poincaré on its Moroccan policy, proposed an Islamic policy and a Ministry of Africa.

Bluysen won reelection on 26 April 1914 by a large majority through the support of Senator Étienne Flandin and of many European, Creole and Hindu councilors. Bluysen won by 33,154 votes against 5,624 for Jean Lemaire, 368 for J. Laporte and 231 for Paul Richard. (Note: Paul Richard had helped Bluysen in his 1910 campaign.) Bluysen sat with the Radical Republican and Radical Socialist group. He proposed to facilitate granting citizenship to soldiers of Algeria, the colonies and protectorates. He was rapporteur of a draft law for appointment of Muslim forensic advisers to the Interministerial Commission of Muslim Affairs. During World War I (1914–18) he was involved in discussions on regulating the press and on distribution of coal. After the war he pushed to quickly restore maritime connections between metropolitan France and the colonies. He support the policy of Clemenceau and was a member of the Peace Treaty Committee.

In the 16 November 1919 legislative elections Bluysen was reelected with a majority of over 2,000 votes. He sat with the Radical Party and Radical Socialist group. He was now less active in the chamber, but spent more time on journalism, and in 1921 became director of Actualités and of Réforme coloniale. He held office until 31 May 1924.

== Senator ==
Bluysen was elected to the Senate for French India on 1 January 1924, and held office until 1 January 1928. Paul Bluysen died on 10 September 1928 in Le Coudray-Montceaux, Yvelines.

== Publications ==
Publications by Bluysen include:

- Paul Bluysen (1888), Huit Jours à Copenhague (voyage de la délégation artistique française). Correspondances adressées à la "République française", Paris: A. Lahure, p. 36
- Paul Bluysen (1890), Paris en 1889 souvenirs et croquis de l'Exposition, preface by Joseph Reinach, Paris: P. Arnould, p. 205
- Paul Bluysen (1898), Félix Faure intime, Paris: F. Juven, p. 259
- Paul Bluysen (1914), Mes amis les Hindous : notes de voyage aux Indes, Ceylan, Pondichéry, Calcutta, Bénarès, Agra, Delhi, Jeypoure, Madras, Mahé, Tandjore, Trichnopoli, Paris: J. Tallandier, p. 211
- Paul Bluysen (1914), Mes amis les Hindous, Paris: J. Tallandier, p. 211
- Paul Bluysen (1917), "Nos relations maritimes avec l'Extrême-Orient", Revue politique et parlementaire, Paris
- Paul Bluysen (1926), Notes de voyage sur la route des Indes en Méditerranée orientale, Naples, Athènes, Constantinople, Smyrne, Beyrouth, Kaiffa, la Judée, Jérusalem, Nazareth, Paris: la Renaissance du livre, p. 212

== Sources ==
- Arthur, Paul (2017), "Alfred Le Chatelier et l'Atelier de Glatigny" (PDF), Sèvres (in French) (26), archived from the original (PDF) on 16 January 2018
- Heehs, Peter (30 May 2008), The Lives of Sri Aurobindo: A Biography, Columbia University Press, ISBN 978-0-231-51184-1
- Jolly, Jean, ed. (1960), "Bluysen (Paul, dit Luc Olivier, dit Henri Thellier)", Dictionnaire des parlementaires français de 1889 à 1940, Presses universitaires de France
- Pastoureau, Mireille (2008), Le duel fatal Harry Alis – Alfred Le Chatelier, 1er mars 1895, un épisode d'histoire littéraire et coloniale (PDF) (in French), Bibliothèque de l’Institut de France
- Paul BLUYSEN (in French), Académie des Sciences Morales, des Lettres et des Arts de Versailles
- Paul Bluysen (in French), Assemblée nationale
- Paul Bluysen (1861-1928) - Auteur du texte (in French), BnF: Bibliotheque nationale de France
- Sujata Nahar (2001), "Pondicherry Elections", Mother's Chronicles, vol. 6 Mirra in South India, Mother's Institute of Research, ISBN 2-902776-69-1
- Thimm, Carl A. (1895), "Fatal Sword Duel", A Complete Bibliography of Fencing and Duelling, Pelican Publishing, ISBN 978-1-4556-0277-3
