= Étienne Flandin =

French magistrate and politician

Étienne Jean Marie Flandin
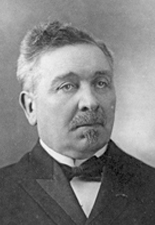
- Official portrait c. 1893

Deputy of Yonne
- In office 3 September 1893 – 31 May 1898

Deputy of Yonne
- In office 27 April 1902 – 2 April 1909

Senator of French India
- In office 30 March 1909 – 20 September 1922
- Preceded by: Jules Godin
- Succeeded by: Henri Gaebelé

Resident-general in Tunisia
- In office 26 October 1918 – 1 January 1921
- Preceded by: Gabriel Alapetite
- Succeeded by: Lucien Saint

Personal details
- Born: 1 April 1853 Paris, France
- Died: 20 September 1922 (aged 69) Paris, France
- Occupation: Magistrate and politician

Étienne Jean Marie Flandin (1 April 1853 – 20 September 1922) was a French magistrate and politician who was twice deputy of Yonne, and was then Senator of French India from 1909 to 1920.

== Early years (1853–93) ==
Étienne Jean Marie Flandin was born on 1 April 1853 in Paris. The Flandin family originated in Domecy-sur-Cure. His parent were Charles Flandin (1803-1887), doctor of medicine, and Aline de Sonis (1823-1857). Charles Flandin supported the Republican opposition during the Second French Empire and became vice-president of the General Council of Yonne. Etienne Flandin attended the Lycée Saint-Louis for his secondary education. He studied law in Paris, where he earned a doctorate.

In 1876 Flandin married Pauline Ribière. He became a professor of civil law at the Faculty of Algiers. He lectured at the Faculty of Algiers from 1880 to 1882. He was Advocate-General at Pau from 1882 to 1887. He was a substitute in Paris from 1887 to 1889, then Attorney General in Algiers from 1889 to 1893. He became a member of the General Council of Yonne.

== Deputy (1893–1909) ==
Flandin was elected on 3 September 1893 as Republican candidate for the Avallon constitutuency of Yonne. He won 5,700 votes in the second round of voting against 4,496 for the Radical candidate, Albert Gallot^{(fr)}. He sat with the Republican Union parliamentary group. He ran for reelection in 1898 but was defeated by Gallot. He left office on 31 May 1898.

In 1902 Flandin won election as deputy of Yonne by 5,768 votes against 5,070 for Gallot. He again sat with the Republican Union group, and was president of this group during the 8th legislature (1902–06). He submitted several legislative proposals concerning the judiciary, taxation and proportional representation in elections. In 1904 he was chairman of a committee to investigate suppression of congregational education. In 1905 he participated in the debate on the law of separation of church and state, which he supported.

Flandin was reelected on 6 May 1906. He won 5,802 votes against 4,000 for the Radical Socialist Paul Degouy^{(fr)}. On 20 January 1908 Flandin proposed a revision of "the penal laws concerning vagrancy and begging, the organization of assistance through work and the supervision of nomads exercising itinerant professions." He proposed that non-nationals should be required to carry a booklet that would be used to record and control their movement.

== Senator (1909–22) ==
On 3 January 1909 Flandin was elected senator for French India by 85 votes against 20 for the incumbent Jules Godin. He was admitted to the senate on 30 March 1909 and resigned from the chamber of deputies on 2 April 1909. He was a member of the Republican Union group. He was a member of many special committees, and was often their president or rapporteur. These included committees on the colonial customs regime, economic blockade of Germany, and offenses against the external security of France. He gave numerous speeches on subjects such as extradition between France and Britain, voting secrecy and wards of the nation. In the legislative elections of 1914 Flandin gave his support to Paul Bluysen as deputy for French India. Bluysen won by a large majority.

At the start of World War I (1914–18) the penalty for desertion in face of the enemy was death. Flandin pointed out that the high rates of acquittal in 1914 and 1915 were probably due to reluctance of judges to apply such a severe sentence. After the law of 27 April 1916 gave the judges more flexibility in punishment, the number of convictions for desertion rose. On 29 March 1918, during a difficult phase of the war, the Senate decided to review a proposed change to the code of military justice of 3 October 1916. As rapporteur, Flandin stated that this was not the time to reopen the question, and that the need for discipline must be addressed as well as the demand for justice that had been formulated by the Chamber a few months earlier. The senators followed Flandin in agreeing on the principle of a secret ballot and the freedom of the accused to communication with his defense council, but refused to increase the number of judges on the tribunals from five to seven.

Flandin was president of the Muslim section of the Parliamentary Committee on Foreign Affairs. He was secretary of the Committee for French Affairs in Syria in 1916. During the war one of the issues was that Muslim soldiers and "unbelievers" were interred together in mass graves. As president of the Committee on Foreign Affairs Flandin warned Aristide Briand in September 1916 that, "Our enemies could not find a subject more likely to overexcite Muslim fanaticism. In 1917 Flandin criticized conscription of Algerian troops, since it thought it wrong to force the indigenous people to accept French practices and ideals. He thought it would be better to use a militia system based on local tribal organization, so the indigène could "evolve not in our civilization, but in his own."

On 26 October 1918 Flandin was appointed temporary Resident General in Tunis. He was given this post by Georges Clemenceau before the armistice had been signed. As the official representative of the French government in Tunisia, he directed the protectorate's administration. He followed the policy of his predecessor, Gabriel Alapetite, in reorganization of indigenous justice and development of the railways. He also created the Public Health and Hygiene administration to fight tuberculosis, typhus and syphilis. He implemented a Water Code for new irrigation projects, which would lead to more intense agricultural production. He was relieved of his functions in Tunisia on 1 January 1921, and returned to France to resume his activity as senator.

Due to the war Flandin's term as senator was extended to 18 January 1920. On that date he was reelected to the senate by 100 votes against 4 for his opponent Martineau. Flandin died on 20 September 1922 in Paris. He was a Knight of the Legion of Honour and an Officer of the Académie française.

== Publications ==
Publications by Étienne Flandin include:

- Étienne Flandin (1873), Vauban. Sa vie. Ses oeuvres, Avallon: impr. de E. Odobé, p. 35
- Flandin, Étienne (1879), Des assemblées provinciales dans l'Empire romain et dans l'Ancienne France: Des Conseils généraux des départements, L. Larose
- Étienne Flandin (1 July 1880), "Un des fondateurs de l'unité italienne, le marquis Giorgio Pallavicino Trivulzio", Nouvelle Revue, Paris: impr. de G. Chamerot: 36
- Étienne Flandin (1901), Institutions politiques de l'Europe contemporaine, vol. Angleterre. Belgique. Allemagne, Paris: Le Soudier
- Étienne Flandin (1914), Institutions politiques de l'Europe contemporaine : constitution, gouvernement, assemblées parlementaires, administration locale, justice, vol. V. Espagne. Val d'Andorre, Paris: H. Le Soudier, p. 368
- Étienne Flandin (1915), L'Allemagne en 1914 : institutions, gouvernement, armée. Empire allemand, États confédérés, Paris: H. Le Soudier, p. 451
- Etienne Flandin (July–December 1920), "Loi tunisienne sur les antiquités", Revue Archéologique, V.12, Presses Universitaires de France: 130–140, JSTOR 23907963

Parliamentary reports by Flandin included:

- Étienne Flandin (1894), Rapport fait au nom de la Commission de la réforme judiciaire chargée d'examiner la proposition de loi de M. Saint-Germain et plusieurs de ses collègues relative à l'organisation des Cours d'assises et du jury criminel en Algérie (Chambre des Députés. 6e Législature Session... de 1894. N°1045 (3 décembre 1894)), Paris: Motteroz / France. Chambre des députés, p. 22
- Étienne Flandin (1896), Rapport fait au nom de la Commission du Budget chargée d'examiner le projet de loi (rectifié) portant fixation du Budget général des Dépenses et des Recettes de l'Exercice 1897, (Ministère des Affaires Etrangères) (Chambre des Députés. 6e législature. Session de 1896. N°2033 (11 juillet 1896)), Paris: Motteroz / France. Chambre des députés, p. 177
- Flandin, Étienne (1897), Rapport sur le protectorat de la France en Tunisie, Impr. générale, J. Picard
- Étienne Flandin (1897), Rapport fait au nom de la Commission de l'Algérie chargée d'examiner le projet de loi relatif aux pouvoirs disciplinaires des administrateurs des communes mixtes de l'Algérie (Chambre des Députés. 6e Législature Session de 1897. N°2487 (3 juin 1897)), Paris: Motteroz / France. Chambre des députés, p. 22
- Étienne Flandin (1897), Rapport fait au nom de la Réforme judiciaire chargée d'examiner la proposition de loi de M. Etienne Flandin et plusieurs de ses collègues, ayant pour objet de régler les conditions d'admission et d'avancement dans la magistrature des Cours et des Tribunaux (Chambre des Députés. 6e Législature Session 1897. N°2682 (19 juillet 1897)), Paris: Motteroz / France. Chambre des députés, p. 35
- Étienne Flandin (1902), Rapport... (Budget général de l'exercice 1903. Ministère des Affaires Etrangères. Protectorats) (Chambre des Députés. 8e législature. Session extraordinaire de 1902. N°611 (6 décembre 1902.)), Paris: Impr. de Motteroz / France. Chambre des députés, p. 59
- Étienne Flandin (1907), Rapport au nom de la commission du suffrage universel chargée d'examiner les propositions de loi... tendant à l'établissement du scrutin de liste avec représentation proportionnelle dans les élections de la Chambre des Députés (Chambre des Députés. 9e législature. Session de 1907. N°883 [22 mars 1907.]), Paris: Impr. de Motteroz et Martinet / France. Chambre des députés, p. 28

== Sources ==
- Berlière, Jean-Marc (2014-01-14), Justices Militaires Et Guerres Mondiales (Europe 1914-1950) / Military Justices and World Wars (Europe 1914-1950) (in French), Presses universitaires de Louvain, ISBN 978-2-87558-235-5
- Duclert, Vincent; Bancaud, Alain (2002), Justice, politique et République: de l'affaire Dreyfus à la guerre d'Algérie (in French), Editions Complexe, ISBN 978-2-87027-926-7
- "Etienne Flandin", Sycomore (in French), Assemblée nationale
- Étienne Flandin (1853–1922) (in French), BnF: Bibliotheque nationale de France
- Étienne Flandin, résident général de France à Tunis (in French), Archives dép. Yonne
- Fogarty, Richard S. (2008-07-16), Race and War in France: Colonial Subjects in the French Army, 1914–1918, JHU Press, ISBN 978-0-8018-8824-3
- Jolly, Jean, ed. (1960), "FLANDIN (ETIENNE, JEAN-MARIE)", Dictionnaire des parlementaires français de 1889 à 1940, Presses universitaires de France
- Jolly, Jean, ed. (1960b), "Bluysen (Paul, dit Luc Olivier, dit Henri Thellier)", Dictionnaire des parlementaires français de 1889 à 1940, Presses universitaires de France
- Piazza, Pierre (2004-03-26), Histoire de la carte d'identité nationale (in French), Odile Jacob, ISBN 978-2-7381-1406-8
