= Saraswati River (Madhya Pradesh) =

Location
- Country: India
- State: Madhya Pradesh
- City: Indore

Physical characteristics
- Source
  - location: Indore, India
- Mouth: Kshipra river

Basin features
- Tributaries
  - right: Kanh river

Saraswati river (IAST: Sáraswatī-nadī́) is a river flowing through Indore, the commercial capital of the Indian state of Madhya Pradesh. It doesn't contain freshwater but instead has become polluted mainly due to the pollution of the Kanh river.

For the past few years efforts are being done to revive the dying river by the means of projects.

== Etymology ==
Sárasvatī (cognate:Saraswati) is the feminine nominative singular form of the adjective sárasvat (which occurs in the Rigveda as the name of the keeper of the celestial waters), derived from ‘sáras’ + ‘vat’, meaning ‘having sáras-’. Sanskrit sáras- means ‘lake, pond’ (cf. the derivative sārasa- ‘lake bird = Sarus crane’). Mayrhofer considers unlikely a connection with the root *sar- ‘run, flow’ but does agree that it could have been a river that connected many lakes due to its abundant volumes of water-flow.

Sarasvatī may be a cognate of Avestan Harax^{v}atī, perhaps. In the younger Avesta, Harax^{v}atī is Arachosia, a region described to be rich in rivers, and its Old Persian cognate Harauvati.

It may be named after the holy Sarasvati river mentioned in the Rigveda.

== See also ==
- Fair river sharing
- List of rivers by discharge
- List of rivers by length
- List of rivers of India
