= Assembly of Representatives =

Assembly of Representatives may refer to:

- Assembly of Representatives (Mandatory Palestine), the parliament of the Jewish community in Mandatory Palestine 1920–1949
- Assembly of Representatives (Morocco), the elected lower house of the Parliament of Morocco.
- Assembly of Representatives (Tajikistan), the elected lower house of the Supreme Assembly of Tajikistan
- Assembly of Representatives (Yemen), or House of Representatives, the elected lower house of the Parliament of Yemen

== See also ==
- House of Representatives
- Representative Assembly of French India, 1946–1955
