= Eugène Le Moignic =

French doctor and politician (1875–1947)

Senator of French India
- In office 9 December 1928. – 31 December 1944
- Preceded by: Paul Bluysen
- Succeeded by: Maurice Paquirissamypoullé; V. Subbiah

Personal details
- Born: 2 May 1875 Toulon, Var, France
- Died: 1 August 1947 (aged 72) Paris, France
- Occupation: Physician

Eugène Le Moignic (2 May 1875 – 1 August 1947) was a French naval physician, bacteriologist and politician. He was Senator of French India from 1928 to 1944.

== Doctor ==
Eugène Le Moignic was born on 2 May 1875 in Toulon, Var. He became a naval doctor and a skilled bacteriologist. As a naval doctor, in 1909 he coauthored a report on protection of employees of British India against cholera, plague and typhoid fever. In 1910 he wrote a report on vaccination against typhoid in Egypt and Malta using the method of Wright and Leishman. He became head of the lipo-vaccine laboratory in Paris. He was appointed a government commissioner. Le Moignic was a close collaborator of Paul Painlevé.

== Senator ==
In the 1928 senatorial elections for French India, Le Moignic was supported by Sellane Naicker of the Franco-Hindu party. Le Moignic was elected senator of French India on 9 December 1928. He sat with the Democratic Left group. He was rapporteur of the committees on the navy, the army and the airforce, and was also rapporteur or member of the committee on the colonies. On 28 June 1935 he reported the opinion of this committee on the bill to approve the Franco-Chinese convention. Le Moignic was reelected on 20 October 1935 with a decisive majority. The election was validated on 15 January 1936. In 1936 he was involved in a discussion initiated by Henry Chéron on the lack of government initiative in ensuring decentralization and expansion of the armaments industry. He blamed parliament for preventing the army and navy from entering into contracts as needed.

During World War II (1939–45), after the defeat of France Le Moignic voted for the Constitutional law of 10 July 1940 that established the regime of Vichy France. After the Liberation of France Le Moignie was among the members of parliament who were exonerated by the Jury d'honneur. The jury of honour removed the ineligibility caused by his vote for the constitutional law. His mandate ended on 31 December 1944. He died in Paris on 1 August 1947 at the age of 72.

== Publications ==
Publications by Le Moignic include:

- Eugène Le Moignic (1902), Orthoscopie oculaire; orthos[...]iascopie, Bordeaux
- L. Laffitteau; Eugène Le Moignic (1912), L'Ozone dans l'hygiène et l'industrie, Paris: Éditions et librairie, p. 59
- Eugène Le Moignic; Albert Sézary (1918), Nouvelle méthode de vaccination antityphoïdique, le lipo-vaccin T A B, Les Actualités médicales, Paris: J.-B. Baillière et fils, p. 17
- Eugène Le Moignic; Louis Tissier (1930), [Interpellations au sujet de l'administration française dans nos établissements de l'Inde (Extrait du "Journal officiel de la République française". Débats parlementaires. Sénat. 2e séance du 25 mars 1930), Pondichéry: impr. de Barathy / France. Sénat, p. 16

== Sources ==
- Agusthin sahayam, F (2014), "V: Movement for liberation from the French", Social transformation of Pondicherry during french rule from 1674 1954 (PDF), Madurai Kamraj University – via Shodhganga
- Alexander, Martin S. (13 November 2003), The Republic in Danger: General Maurice Gamelin and the Politics of French Defence, 1933-1940, Cambridge University Press, ISBN 978-0-521-52429-2
- Collectif (2005), "LEMOIGNIC (Eugène)", Dictionnaire des parlementaires français de 1940 à 1958 (in French), vol. 5 (L-O), Paris: La Documentation française, ISBN 2-11-005990-7
- Colonies et protectorats britanniques (1893-1920) (in French), Anom: Archives nationales d'outre-mer
- Eugène Le Moignic (1875-1947) (in French), BnF: Bibliothèque nationale de France
- Jolly, Jean, ed. (1960), "LE MOIGNIC (EUGÈNE)", Dictionnaire des parlementaires français de 1889 à 1940, Presses universitaires de France
- LE MOIGNIC Eugène (in French), Sénat de France
- Wieviorka, Olivier (2009), Orphans of the Republic: The Nation's Legislators in Vichy France, Harvard University Press, ISBN 978-0-674-03261-3
