= List of senators of French India =

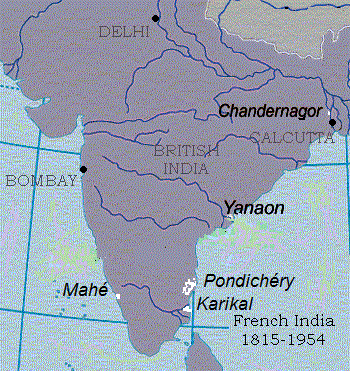
The five small enclaves of French India

Following is a list of senators of French India, people who have represented the colony of French India in the Senate of France. Officially called the Établissements français dans l'Inde, the colony consisted of five small enclaves, of which Pondicherry was the largest.

== Third Republic ==
Senators for French India under the French Third Republic were:

- Pierre Desbassyns de Richemont (36 March 1876–1882)
- Jacques Hébrard (8 January 1882–1891)
- Jules Godin (11 January 1891–1909)
- Étienne Flandin (7 January 1909–1922) died in office
- Henri Gaebelé (9 March 1922–1924) resigned
- Paul Bluysen (9 December 1924–1928) died in office
- Docteur Eugène Le Moignic (1928–1944)

== Fourth Republic ==
Senators for French India under the French Fourth Republic were:

- Maurice Paquirissamypoullé (1947–1955)
- Caïlacha Subbiah (1947–1948)

== Sources ==
- Liste des anciens sénateurs de la IIIème République par circonscription (in French), Sénat de France
- Liste des anciens sénateurs de la IVème République par circonscription (in French), Sénat de France
