= Saraswoti =

Saraswoti may refer to:

- Sarasvati River
- Saraswoti, Nepal

== See also ==
- Saraswati (disambiguation)
