= Jules Godin =

French lawyer and politician

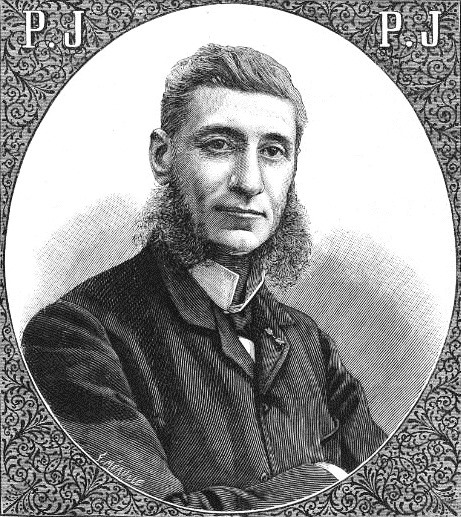

Deputy of French India
- In office 16 April 1876 – 14 October 1881

Senator of French India
- In office 11 January 1891 – 2 January 1909
- Preceded by: Jacques Hébrard
- Succeeded by: Étienne Flandin

Personal details
- Born: 14 March 1844 Versailles, Seine-et-Oise, France
- Died: 21 December 1925 (aged 81) Le Perray, Yvelines, France
- Occupation: Lawyer and politician

Jules Godin (14 March 1844 – 21 December 1925) was a French lawyer and politician of the French Third Republic. He was Deputy of French India from 1876 to 1881 and Senator of French India from 1891 to 1909. He was briefly Minister of Public Works in 1898.

== Life ==
=== Early years ===
Jules Godin was born on 14 March 1844 in Versailles, Seine-et-Oise. He studied law at the Faculty of Paris, and received a doctorate in 1868. He purchased a position as lawyer at the Council of State and at the Court of Cassation. In this capacity he supported the city of Pondicherry.

=== Deputy ===
Godin was elected Deputy of French India on 16 April 1876 by 18,614 out of 18,691 votes, without having formally entered the race or submitted a profession of faith. He was a moderate Republican, and sat with the center left. He was one of the 363^{(fr)}. After the chamber was dissolved, Godin ran for reelection on 11 November 1877 against the official government candidate, Benoist d'Azy. He was reelected by 15,314 votes against 8,040 for his opponent. In the chamber he sat with the Opportunist Republicans majority. He supported the ministry of Jules Armand Dufaure, voted for article 7 of the law on higher education, for invalidation of the election of Louis Auguste Blanqui and against the plenary amnesty. He held office until 14 October 1881.

Godin ran for reelection on 25 September 1881 but received only 463 votes against 30,500 for Louis Pierre-Alype^{(fr)}, who was elected. He became a counselor at the Lyon Court of Appeal, then in 1883 at the Paris Court of Appeal. He was again defeated by Pierre-Alype in the 1889 legislative elections. He was made a Knight of the Legion of Honour on 28 December 1889.

=== Senator ===
Godin ran for election to the senate for the French Indies on 11 January 1891 and was elected by 46 votes against 44 for the incumbent Jacques Hébrard. He spoke in the Senate on legal costs, appropriations needed due to the events in Dahomey in early 1892, and reparations for miscarriage of justice. He was Secretary of the Senate from 1894 to 1896. On 17 September 1898 when the cabinet of Henri Brisson was formed he was appointed Minister of Public Works in place of Louis Tillaye, who had resigned. In October 1898 the Brisson cabinet resigned after losing a vote of confidence in the Chamber after various arrests related to the Dreyfus affair.

Godin was reelected in the first round in the Senate elections of 7 January 1900. He was appointed a member of the Higher Council of the Colonies, and vice-president of the Navy committee. He was often involved in debates about colonies and the merchant marine. He spoke in the debate of the bill passed by the Chamber of Deputies concerning organization of the colonial army. In 1905 he spoke at length in the debate on the jurisdiction of justices of the peace, where he argued against restrictions on their powers. After the disturbances in the 1908 legislative elections in French India he demanded that the powers of the governor be restricted. He ran for reelection on 3 January 1909 but won only 20 votes against 85 for Étienne Flandin, deputy of Yonne.

=== Last years ===
After returning to private life Godin became President of the Council of Rambouillet. On 27 January 1919 he became a member of the Executive Committee of the Democratic Republican Alliance, and later he became president of this organization. In 1922 he joined the Democratic and Social Republican party, and was a member of the political steering committee. He ran for election as Senator of French India on 17 December 1922 in a by-election after Senator Étienne Flandin had died in office. Henri Gaebelé was elected by 99 votes against 4 for Godin. Godin strongly protested the election, and backed his claims up with massive documentation. Senator Marius Roustan reviewed the case and reported to the Senate on 23 June 1923 that the election was valid, which was accepted without debate.

Jules Godin died on 21 December 1925 in Le Perray, Yvelines.

== Publications ==
Jules Godin published two legal theses, one for his doctorate in law and the other for his license. In 1892 he published a Commentaire de la loi de frais de justice (Commentary on the Law of Legal Costs). He wrote numerous legislative proposals and reports. A sample of the longer publications follows:

=== Theses ===
- Jules Godin (1868), Droit romain : du "Pignus nominis et pignoris". Droit français : de la Subrogation dans l'hypothèque et spécialement dans l'hypothèque légale de la femme mariée. (Thèse pour le doctorat), Versailles: impr. de E. Aubert / Faculté de droit. Paris, p. 188
- Jules Godin (28 August 1866), [De Nautico foenore. Des contrats aléatoires. Des contrats à la grosse.] (Thèse pour la licence), Versailles: impr. E. Aubert, p. 47

=== Legislative proposals ===
- Jules Godin; Peulevey (25 January 1881), Modification de la loi du 10 septembre 1874 sur l'hypothèque maritime (Chambre des députés, 2e législature, session de 1881. N°3267), Paris: Impr. de A. Quantin / France. Chambre des députés, p. 13
- Jules Godin (25 May 1891), Sur les sociétés d'ouvriers et sur les sociétés de patrons et d'ouvriers, en vue de la participation aux bénéfices (Sénat. Session 1891. N°93), Paris: Impr. de P. Mouillot / France. Sénat, p. 81
- Jules Godin; Munier, Cordelet, Demôle (8 February 1896), Sur la compétence des juges de paix, présentée par MM. Jules Godin, Munier, Cordelet, Demôle (Sénat, session 1896, N°22), Paris: Impr. de P. Mouillot / France. Sénat, p. 55

=== Parliamentary reports ===
- Jules Godin (7 June 1879), Commission chargée d'examiner le projet de loi portant institution du jury dans les Colonies de la Martinique, de la Guadeloupe et de la Réunion (Chambre des députés, 2e législature, session 1879, N°1477), Versailles: Impr. de Cerf et fils / France. Chambre des députés, p. 37
- Jules Godin (9 December 1880), commission chargée d'examiner le projet de loi portant ratification de la cession faite à la France par S. M. Pomaré V de la souveraineté pleine et entière des archipels de la Société dépendant de la couronne de Taïti) (Chambre des députés, 2e législature, session extraordinaire de 1880. N°3108), Paris: Impr. de A. Quantin / France. Chambre des députés, p. 22
- Jules Godin (28 June 1892), Rapport fait, au nom de la Commission de la marine, chargée d'examiner le projet de loi, adopté par la Chambre des députés, portant organisation du corps des officiers mécaniciens de la marine (Sénat. Session 1892. N°166), Paris: Impr. de P. Mouillot, p. 46
- Jules Godin (9 July 1892), Rapport fait, au nom de la Commission des finances, chargée d'examiner le projet de loi, adopté par la Chambre des députés, portant : 1 ° ouverture au ministre de la marine et des colonies de crédits supplémentaires au titre du budget de l'exercice 1892; 2 ° annulation de crédits au titre du même budget (Sénat. Session 1892. N°227), Paris: Impr. de P. Mouillot, p. 41
- Jules Godin (15 June 1893), Commission de la Marine chargée d'examiner le projet de loi portant organisation du cadre des officiers de la Marine et des équipages de la flotte (Sénat, session 1893, N°224), Paris: Impr. de P. Mouillot, p. 109
- Jules Godin (6 November 1894), Commission chargée d'examiner le projet de résolution de M. Demôle, tendant à décider que le Sénat demeure saisi régulièrement de toute proposition de loi qui lui est transmie par la Chambre des Députés qui l'a votée (Sénat, session extraordinaire 1894, N°5), Paris: Impr. de P. Mouillot, p. 52
- Jules Godin (16 June 1896), Commission chargée d'examiner la proposition de loi de M. Jules Godin et plusieurs de ses collègues, sur la compétence des juges de paix (Sénat, session 1896, N°141), Paris: Impr. de P. Mouillot, p. 68
- Jules Godin (1898), Rapport fait, au nom de la Commission chargée d'examiner le projet de loi sur le casier judiciaire, par M. Jules Godin,... (Sénat. Session de 1898. N°95), Paris: Impr. de P. Mouillot, p. 106
- Jules Godin (22 November 1900), Augmentation de la flotte (Sénat. Session extraordinaire 1900. N°354), Paris: Impr. de P. Mouillot, p. 84
- Jules Godin (17 January 1901), Budget général, exercice 1901 : ministère de la marine (Sénat. Session 1901. N°21), Paris: Impr. de P. Mouillot, p. 76
- Jules Godin (25 February 1901), Situation des mécaniciens, chauffeurs et agents des trains (Sénat. Session 1901. N°85), Paris: Impr. de P. Mouillot, p. 108
- Jules Godin (11 March 1902), Règlementation du travail des mécaniciens, chauffeurs et agents des trains, et conditions de retraite du personnel des chemins de fer français) (Sénat. Session ordinaire de 1902. N°123), Paris: Impr. de P. Mouillot, p. 58
- Jules Godin (31 March 1903), Rapport supplémentaire fait au nom de la commission chargée d'examiner la proposition de loi, adoptée par la Chambre des députés, adoptée avec modifications par le Sénat, modifiée par la Chambre des députés, relative à la réglementation du travail des mécaniciens, chauffeurs et agents des trains et aux conditions de retraite du personnel des chemins de fer français (Sénat. Session ordinaire de 1903. N°134), Paris: Impr. de P. Mouillot, p. 73
- Jules Godin (1904), Commission chargé d'examiner la proposition de loi concernant : 1 °/ la compétence des juges de paix; 2 °/ la réorganisation des justices de paix (Sénat. Session extraordinaire de 1904. N°297), Paris: Impr. de P. Mouillot, p. 100

== Sources ==
- Jolly, Jean, ed. (1960), "GODIN (JULES)", Dictionnaire des parlementaires français de 1889 à 1940, Presses universitaires de France
- Jolly, Jean, ed. (1960b), "GAEBELÉ (JEAN, Henri, FRÉDÉRIC)", Dictionnaire des parlementaires français de 1889 à 1940, Presses universitaires de France
- Jules Godin (in French), Assemblée nationale
- Jules Godin (1844-1925) (in French), BnF: Bibliotheque nationale de France
- Robert, Adolphe; Cougny, Gaston (1889–1891), "GODIN (JULES)", in Edgar Bourloton (ed.), Dictionnaire des Parlementaires français (1789–1889) (in French)
