= Harahvaiti =

Harahvaiti may be:

- a reconstructed old name of the Iranian deity Anahita
- the old names of the following:
  - Arachosia, an ancient region in south Afghanistan
  - the Arghandab River flowing through it
  - Alexandria Arachosia, the main city in the region, later known as Kandahar

== See also ==
- Saraswati (disambiguation), Sanskrit equivalent
