= Henri Gaebelé =

French politician

Jean Fritz Henri Gaebelé

Mayor of Pondicerry
- In office 19 September 1908 – 15 May 1928

Senator of French India
- In office 17 December 1922 – 25 December 1923
- Preceded by: Étienne Flandin
- Succeeded by: Paul Bluysen

Personal details
- Born: 10 March 1860 Munster, Haut-Rhin, France
- Died: 27 October 1936 (aged 76) Pondichéry, French India
- Occupation: Cotton manufacturer, politician

Jean Fritz Henri Gaebelé (10 March 1860 – 27 October 1936) was a French cotton yarn and fabric manufacturer and politician who was Mayor of Pondicherry in French India from 1907 to 1928, and Senator of French India from 1922 to 1924. He played a leading role in the violent conflict in this period between the upper-caste Indian party and the lower-caste and Muslim French party, and at times held almost dictatorial power in the colony.

== Early years ==
Jean Fritz (Frédéric) Henri Gaebelé was born on 10 March 1860 in Munster, Haut-Rhin, Alsace. His parents were Jean Martin Gaebelé and Marie Anne Laeuffer. After the Franco-Prussian War Alsace came under German administration in 1871. Gaebelé left Alsace before he was 20 to avoid serving in the German army. He directed two spinning mills in the Vosges, then arrived in Pondicherry on 13 April 1884 as director of the Établissements Textiles de Savana. That year he married Marie Joséphine Anna Blin (1857–1929). Their children were Robert François Gaebelé (1888–1945) and Henriette Gaebelé (died 1940). In 1888 the Banque de l'Indochine helped Gaebelé install the first telephone network in French India. On his advice the bank began to build large and hygienic warehouses for storing peanuts.

In 1889 after a short but violent contest Gaebelé was elected mayor of the commune of Oulgaret and resigned from his position with the Établissements Textiles de Savana. He and his two brothers founded the Filatures et Tissages Gaebelé. The business started with 1,500 spindles and 50 looms. In 1890 the "Filatures et tissages Gaebelé" was directed by Henri, Albert and Fritz Gaebelé. It had three spinning mills in Modéliarpeth, Cossépaléom and Pondicherry, with 10,300 spindles and 270 looms. The company manufactured cotton fabrics dyed with indigo called "guinées" for sale in India, Senegal, Sudan, Morocco, Algeria and Tunisia, blue fabric for Madagascar, Réunion and the Pacific islands, and unbleached canvasses. A dyehouse was attached to the business. The company had its headquarters in Colmar and shareholders in Bordeaux, so it retained strong links to metropolitan France.

== Pondicherry politics ==
Henri Gaebelé left Oulgaret and settled in Pondicherry, where he lived the rest of his life. He was quickly elected to the municipal council. Around 1890 Gaebelé was one of the founders of the opposition group commonly called the French Party. The party gained from the defection of the Vannia (farmer) caste from the Indian Party led by Chanemougam due to resentment of the arrogance of the high castes. The Vannias were over 30% of the population. The French policy of assimilation, hated by the upper castes, also helped revive the caste war.

In 1892 Gaebelé was elected to the General Council of French India for the first time. During the parliamentary elections around this time the candidates, few of whom had visited India, paid local agents to ensure they were elected, and the agents hired gangs of hooligans to control the polls. The 1893 legislative elections were fought between the French Party and the Indian Party. There was widespread fraud, with many dead people on the voter lists, and much violence. In one incident Gaebelé, who was a candidate, was wounded by a bullet. In the years that followed the lower castes were oppressed under the rule of Chanemougam, the "King of French India".

Gaebelé became a general councilor in 1905 and held office until his death in 1936. In 1905 he was appointed President of the Chamber of Commerce. He was also President of the Chamber of Agriculture. In the legislative elections of 6 May 1906 Gaebelé's associate, the former governor Philema Lemaire, was elected with the support of the Vannias and the Muslims. The French Party, now called the Gaebelé Party, forced Chanemougam to flee to British territory in 1906, where he died in 1908. Gaebelé was Mayor of Pondicherry from 19 September 1908 to 15 May 1928.

The "Neo-Chanemougamists", the Indian party, recovered quickly from the defeat of 1906. They openly supported the Indian nationalists of British India. In the 1910 elections the violence was even worse than usual. On 24 April 1910 the Indian party's candidate, Paul Bluysen, defeated Lemaire. Acting governor Ernest Fernand Lévecque sent a telegram to the Colonial Ministry on 24 April 1910 giving the first results. He reported, "Yesterday many incidents common to Pondicherry and Mudaliarpet; scuffles, blows, violent disputes around ballot-boxes, some wounded; exchange of blows, a few mortal wounds." Gaebelé was blamed for the violence in 1910. He was ousted from power that year. For the next four years there were violent clashes between the followers of Gaebelé and Lemaire on one side, and of Gaston Pierre and Bluysen on the other. Houses were looted and burned, politicians were assassinated and bombs were exploded.

In 1914 Gaebelé regained control through an extraordinary reversal, where he became an ally of Bluysen and helped him get reelected, while Lemaire sided with Pierre. While Europe was engaged in World War I (1914–18) the political situation in India calmed down. Gaebelé controlled French India from the start of World War I until 1927, with increased importance in the 1920s. He arranged for supply of drinking water to Pondicherry, Karaikal and Chandannagar, and suppressed the epidemics that had been endemic until then. Gaebelé was responsible for various public works, including upgrades to the port facilities, purchase of the warehouses and a power station. He also reformed the taxation system. He often gave his favours to a handful of people without considering the needs of the bulk of the population, and began to be seen as a dictator. His most serious rival was the former magistrate Gaston Pierre.

== Senator ==
Gaebelé was elected Senator of French India on 17 December 1922 in a by-election after Senator Étienne Flandin had died in office. Gaebelé received 99 votes against 4 for his competitor, Jules Godin, who had been Senator of French India from 1891 to 1909. Godin strongly protested the election, and backed his claims up with massive documentation. Senator Marius Roustan reviewed the case and reported to the Senate on 23 June 1923 that the election was valid, which was accepted without debate. Gaebelé's election confirmed his grip on power in the colony, but to strengthen his position he courted the poorest of the population, the outcasts, patnavas and vannias. Gaebelé resigned from the Senate by letter on 25 December 1923 since he had found that after 40 years living in the tropics he was unable to cope with the climate of Paris, and had to spend the whole year in Cannes. On 9 March 1924 he was replaced by Paul Bluysen, until then Deputy of French India.

== Last years ==
Gaebelé returned to Pondicherry. During the 1920s the hegemony of the Gaebelé party was similar to a dictatorship. The authorities in metropolitan France were unconcerned, and were mainly interested in the value of the colony from its exports of peanuts. In 1926 Filatures et tissages Gaebelé was transformed into a société anonyme with capital of 250,000 rupees. The mill had 20,600 spindles and 310 looms. Gaebelé lost power in 1927. In the elections to the Pondicherry General Council on 21 October 1934 all the candidates of the Gaebelé-Salvaradjou party were beaten. After this there was a long period of unrest in French India. Gaebelé died in Pondicherry on 27 October 1936 aged 76. He was an Officer of the Legion of Honour, Grand Officer of the Order of Glory (Tunisia) and Commander of the Ordre du Nichan El-Anouar.

== Sources ==
- Berghahn, Volker Rolf (2005), Imperial Germany, 1871–1918: Economy, Society, Culture, and Politics, Berghahn Books, ISBN 978-1-84545-011-3
- Davis, Diane E.; Libertun de Duren, Nora (1 February 2011), Cities and Sovereignty: Identity Politics in Urban Spaces, Indiana University Press, ISBN 0-253-00506-X
- "Filatures et tissages Gaebelé" (PDF), entreprises-coloniales (in French)
- Gaudart de Soulages, Michel, "Jean Fritz "Henri" GAEBELE", Geneanet
- Heehs, Peter (30 May 2008), The Lives of Sri Aurobindo: A Biography, Columbia University Press, ISBN 978-0-231-51184-1
- Jolly, Jean, ed. (1960), "GAEBELÉ (JEAN, Henri, FRÉDÉRIC)", Dictionnaire des parlementaires français de 1889 à 1940, Presses universitaires de France
- Stech, Zorian (15 September 2011), Les possessions françaises en Inde dès les années 1920 jusqu'à l'indépendance : histoire d'un revirement politique (PDF) (thesis) (in French), Université de Montréal
- Sujata Nahar (2001), "Pondicherry Elections", Mother's Chronicles, vol. 6 Mirra in South India, Mother's Institute of Research, ISBN 2-902776-69-1
- Weber, Jacques (1987), Les établissements français en Inde au XIXe siècle (1816–1914) (in French), Université de Provence, archived from the original on 11 April 2018
- Weber, Jacques (21 April 1989), Chanemougam, le "roi de l'Inde française" (in French), CIDIF: Centre d'information et de documentation de l'Inde francophone
