= Maurice Paquirissamypoullé =

Senator for French India
- In office 26 January 1947 – 19 June 1955
- Preceded by: Eugène Le Moignic
- Succeeded by: (seat suppressed)

Personal details
- Born: Ajagasoundirame; 9 August 1906 Karaikal, French India
- Died: 13 January 1956 (aged 49) Karaikal, Puducherry, India
- Also called: Maurice Paquirissamy-Poullé

Maurice Paquirissamypoullé, or Paquirissamy-Poullé, (9 August 1906 – 13 January 1956) was a rice trader and politician from the colony of Karaikal in French India. He represented the colony in the Council of the Republic from 1947 until 1955, when his seat was dissolved following the union with India. He did what he could to ensure a peaceful transition of power.

== Early years ==
Maurice Paquirissamypoullé was born on 9 August 1906 in Karaikal, French India. He studied at the Collège Colonial in Pondicherry. He became a rice trader. Paquirissamypoullé did not speak French well, and flirted with communism before entering mainstream politics as a socialist. He was married to Nagammal. He was born Hindu Vellala and became renonçant (i.e., rejecting the Hindu traditions) on 10 December 1924.

== Local politics ==
After World War II (1939–45) Paquirissamypoullé was elected a member of the Representative Assembly of French India on 15 December 1946. He became vice-president of the assembly on 25 January 1947. The French administration was often lethargic and bureaucratic, despite attempts by Paquirissamypoullé in the Assembly to goad it into action. On 20 December 1948 the Assembly voted for a motion that approved the resolution of the Indian National Congress in Jaipur that required annexation of all foreign possessions in India, and called for the opening of negotiations between Paris and New Delhi. Paquirissamypoullé approved this resolution. On 23 October 1948 Paquirissamypoullé was elected municipal councilor of Karikal. He was appointed mayor of Karaikal on 27 October 1948. He was reelected municipal councilor on 3 May 1953, holding office until his death.

== Senator ==
On 26 January 1947 Paquirissamypoullé was elected to the Council of the Republic (the equivalent to the Senate in the French Fourth Republic) to represent the French Establishments in India (Établissements français dans l'Inde). He sat with the Popular Republican Movement (MRP, Mouvement Républicain Populaire) group. He was reelected on 19 December 1948. In 1949 he participated in debating the draft law for organizing a referendum in Chandannagar, the first of the French Establishments to become part of the Indian Union (in 1951). In 1953 he asked for government assistance for the victims of a cyclone that had devastated Karikal. He was a member of the Committee on Economic Affairs, Customs and Trade Conventions in 1952, and of the Beverage Committee from 1952 to 1954.

In January 1954 Paquirissamypoullé returned from Paris, where he had met with Georges Bidault, Minister of Foreign Affairs, and Louis Jacquinot, Minister of Overseas France. They had told him that a merger of the French Establishments with India was inevitable, and France wanted the transfer to take place under the most favorable terms and conditions possible. The Indian government made repeated acts of aggression and intimidation that year. Yanaon was lost to India on 13 June 1954, and Mahé was evacuated by the freighter Granville on 16 July 1954. Paquirissamypoullé, until then loyal to France, bowed to the inevitable and came out in favour of the return to India. The troops of Dadala Raphael Ramanayya attacked the commune of Bahour to the north of Pondicherry on 22 July 1954. Paquirissamypoullé managed to maintain calm in Karikal, whose evacuation by the French would have signalled general evacuation of the colonies.

Pierre Mendès France became head of the French government on 17 June 1954 on a program of peace in Indochina. On 20 July 1954 he asked Robert Buron, Minister of Overseas France, to settle the French Indian problem. A Franco-Indian accord was signed in New Delhi on 11 October 1954. The formal transfer of power took place on 31 October 1954. The last four French Establishments in India, Karaikal, Mahé, Pondicherry and Yanaon, became part of the Indian Union. Their seat in the Council of the Republic was suppressed by decree of 5 May 1955. Maurice Paquirissamypoullé's term of office ended on 4 July 1955. He died on 13 January 1956 in Karaikal, Puducherry, India.

== Positions held ==
Preceded by Position created	Membre de l'assemblée réprésentative de Karikal; 1946 – 13 January 1956	Succeeded by P. Shanmugam

== See also ==
- Pondicherry Representative Assembly
- 1955 Pondicherry Representative Assembly election

== Sources ==
- collectif (2012), "PAQUIRISSAMY-POULLÉ (Maurice)", Dictionnaire des parlementaires français de 1940 à 1958 (in French), vol. 6 (P-Z), Paris: La Documentation française, ISBN 978-2110079930
- Gaymard, Hervé (1 January 2009), "Les derniers feux de l'Inde française", Le Rêve Indien de la France (in French)
- Mulvany, Aaron Patrick (12 August 2011), Flood of Memories:Narratives of Flood and Loss in Tamil South India, University of Pennsylvania
- PAQUIRISSAMYPOULLE Maurice (in French), Sénat de France
- Pitoëff, Patrick (1991), "L'Inde française en sursis. 1947-1954" (PDF), Revue française d'histoire d'outre-mer (in French), 78 (290): 105–131, doi:10.3406/outre.1991.2875
- Stech, Zorian (15 September 2011), Les possessions françaises en Inde dès les années 1920 jusqu'à l'indépendance : histoire d'un revirement politique (PDF) (Mémoire de maîtrise) (in French), Université de Montréal
