= Saraswati Devi (veena player) =

16th-century Indian musician

Saraswati Devi was the daughter of Miyan Tansen. As per the accepted culture of tasteful, aesthetically driven, culturally refined and elegant families, she was trained in different departments of fine arts and most importantly music which evokes positive emotions.

== Born ==
Her father was Tansen, a famous classical musician, poet and a men of great understanding. His cap was the highest among the nobles of the court of Mughal Emperor Akbar. Raja Samokhan Singh and Miyan Tansen were both disciples of Swami Haridas in the same time period.

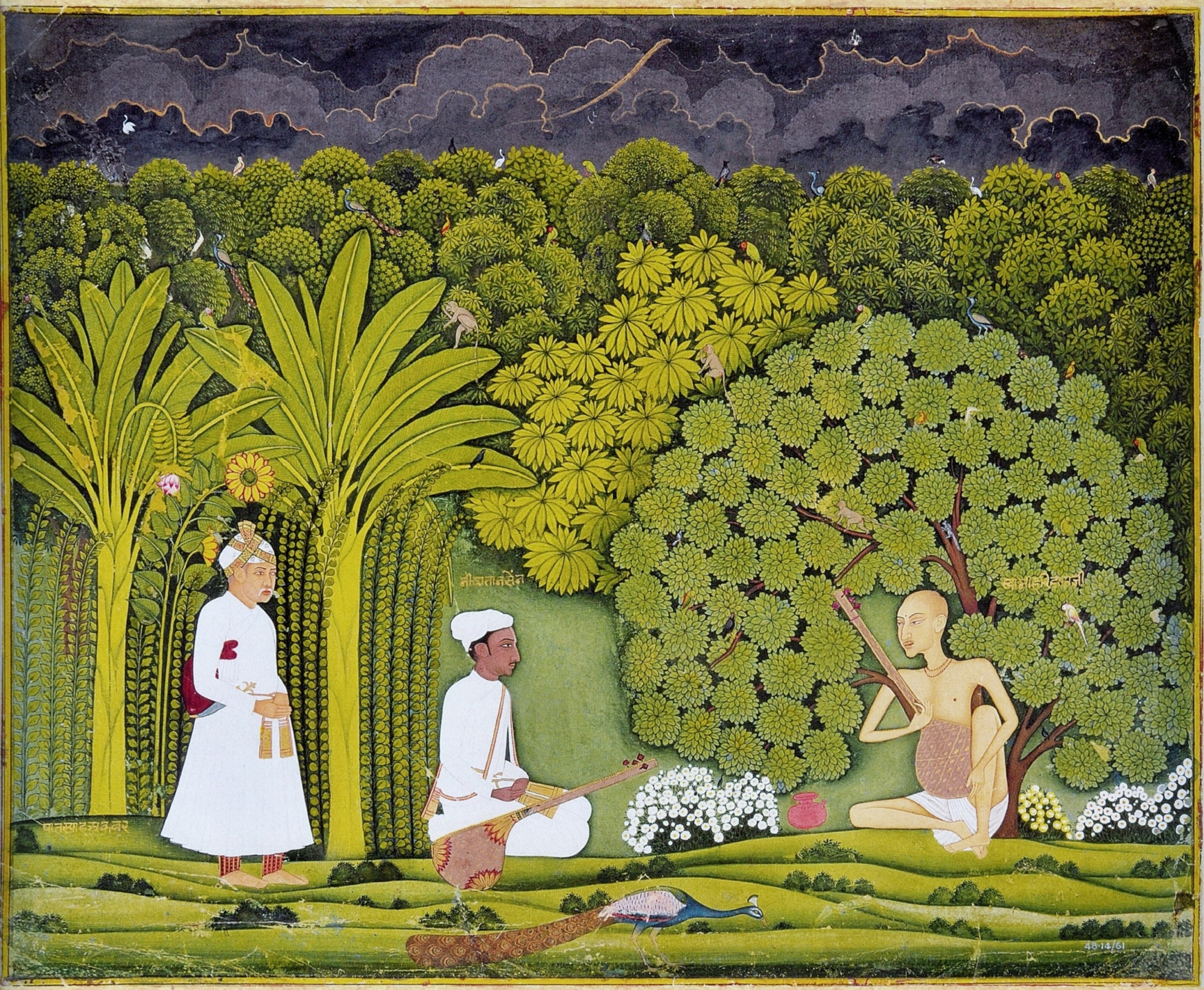
Akbar watching as Tansen receives a lesson from Swami Haridas. Imaginary situation depicted in Mughal miniature painting (Rajasthani style, c. 1750 AD).

.

== Career ==
She was a key figure in the early days of Senia Gharana and was highly accomplished in Rudra Veena performance and Dhrupad vocal music. Saraswati Devi's most celebrated feat stems from a famous musical legend. Tansen framed by jealous officials, was forced to sing Raga Deepak. It was said that singing this raga generated immense heat, enough to ignite lamps, but also capable of causing the singer to burn to death. To save her dying father, she secretly practiced Raga Megh Malhar with a friend, a raga believed to bring rain. Saraswati sang Megh Malhar just in time. Dark clouds gathered, and a torrential downpour extinguished the flames, saving her father's life.

== Family ==
Saraswati Devi married the Raja of Kishangarh, Naubat Khan. The Mughal Emperor Akbar personally arranged their marriage. After the marriage, she accepted Islam and was named Hussaini .
