= Shanmugam =

Shanmugam சண்முகம்
- Pronunciation: Caṇmukam
- Gender: Male
- Language: Tamil

Origin
- Meaning: Six faces
- Region of origin: Southern India; North-eastern Sri Lanka

Other names
- Alternative spelling: Sanmugam; Shanmukham
- Derived: Murugan
- Related names: Arumugam
- See also: Shanmuganathan

Shanmugam (Tamil: சண்முகம், romanized: Caṇmukam) is a Tamil male given name. Due to the Tamil tradition of using patronymic surnames it may also be a surname for males and females.

== Notable people ==
=== Given name ===
- A. C. Shanmugam, Indian politician
- C. Shanmugam, Indian politician
- C. V. Shanmugam, Indian politician
- G. Shanmugam, Indian politician
- K. Shanmugam (born 1959), Singaporean politician and lawyer
- Kannon Shanmugam (born 1972), American lawyer
- M. Shanmugam, Indian politician
- N. T. Shanmugam, Indian politician
- P. Shanmugam (Pondicherry politician) (1927–2013), Indian politician and former chief minister and Lok Sabha member from Pondicherry
- P. Shanmugam (Tamil Nadu politician, born 1946) (died 2006), Indian politician and former Lok Sabha member from Tamil Nadu
- P. Shanmugam (Tamil Nadu politician, born 1960), Indian politician and member of CPI(M)
- P. U. Shanmugam (1924–2007), Indian politician
- R. Shanmugam, Indian politician
- R. K. Shanmukham Chetty (1892–1953), Indian lawyer, economist and politician
- Savithiri Shanmugam (1913–?), Indian National Congress politician
- Shanmugam Subbaiah (1930–2012), Indian film distributor
- T. K. Shanmugam (1912–1973), Indian actor

=== Surname ===
- Kathiravelu Shanmugam Kugathasan (born 1953), Sri Lankan politician
- Sanmugam Appacuddy Tharmalingam (1908–?), Sri Lankan physician and politician
- Sanmugam Arumugam (1905–2000), Ceylonese irrigation engineer and writer
- Shanmugam Jayakumar (born 1939), Singaporean politician, lawyer and diplomat
- Shanmugam Jegadhiswaran, Sri Lankan politician
- Shanmugam Kumaran Tharmalingam (born 1955), Sri Lankan militant
- Shanmugam Manjunath (1978–2005), Indian marketing manager
- Shanmugam Murugesu (1967–2005), Singaporean drug smuggler, soldier and athlete
- Shanmugam Shankar (born 1963), Indian film director and producer
- Shanmugam Venkatesh (born 1978), Indian footballer
