= Saraswati Devi (scholar) =

Indian scholar and poet

Saraswati Devi was a Telugu scholar and poet of the early 20th century from Jataprole Samstanam, Paalamuru.

== Career ==
Saraswati Devi was the editor of a literary magazine called Vijayanti and also the founder of a reading group called Snehalata Kavita sangham. Her works reflect both traditional themes and modern approaches. Saraswati Ramayanam, her famous work, was prescribed as a text book at Madras University and many other universities in 1930-40s.

She started her annual literary journal in 1929 and published more than 200 books. National newspapers like The Hindu praised her work and acknowledged this group's contributions as "precious efforts in making new reading public". The significance of Snehalata Kavita Sangam is that all the board members in this literary group were women. All the evidence shows that many women of Jataprole of Telangana region were deeply involved in poetry writings and discussions (no research has been done so far about this group or of their work). She received many prestigious awards.

== Sources ==
Kantan, Uutukuri Laxmi; Aandra Kavayitrula Charitra
