= V. Subbiah =

Indian independence activist and politician

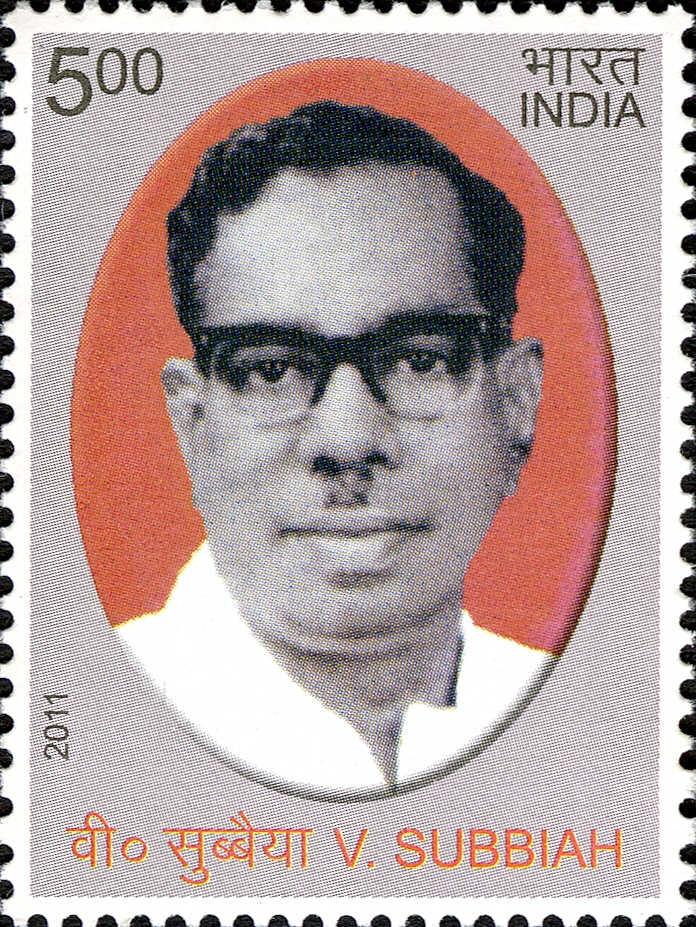

Senator for French India
- In office 26 January 1947 – 7 November 1948
- Preceded by: Eugène Le Moignic

Personal details
- Born: 7 February 1911 Pondicherry, French India
- Died: 12 October 1993 Pondicherry, India
- Party: Communist Party of India
- Spouse: Saraswathi Subbiah
- Education: Calve College High School, Pondicherry
- Occupation: Politician

Varadarajulu Kailasa Subbiah (7 February 1911 – 12 October 1993) was an Indian communist politician from Pondicherry (now Puducherry). Subbiah was the secretary of the Communist Party of French India. He is regarded as the founder of the trade union movement in the union territory. Subbiah was one of the 'Tamrapatra awardees', awarded the decoration for their role in the Indian freedom struggle.

== Early activism ==
Born and raised in Pondicherry in balija family, Subbiah studied at the Calve College High School, but he was expelled from the school after organizing an agitation. The expulsion was however revoked as students and parents had protests against the decision. During the early phase of his political career, Subbiah was influenced by Mahatma Gandhi and joined the Indian National Congress. He founded the Harijan Sevak Sangh in 1933. Moreover, he launched a publication called Sutantiram ('Independence'). Soon he was recruited into the communist movement after having befriended Amir Hyder Khan and S.V. Ghate. He took part in agitations in different areas of the Madras Presidency. He was jailed both by French and British colonial authorities, and moved underground when not in jail.

== Labour organiser ==
In 1935 Subbiah organized a union of thousands of textile workers in Pondicherry. In July 1936, twelve textile workers were killed as French police opened fire on demonstrators in a bid to quell the agitations of the union. The killings sparked uproar. Nehru asked Subbiah to travel to Paris to negotiate directly with the French government. Subbiah did so, and in Paris he was able to reach an agreement guaranteeing a law for an 8-hour day for the workers in French India.

== Senator ==
In 1946 Subbiah was elected to the Representative Assembly of French India as a candidate of the National Democratic Front. On 26 January 1947 he was elected to the Council of the Republic (the equivalent to the Senate in the French Fourth Republic) as a representative of French India. Maurice Paquirissamypoullé was also elected to represent French India in this election. Subbiah sat in the Republican and Resistance Union for the French Union (the parliamentary faction of the French Communist Party). He did not seek reelection in the renewal of 19 December 1948.

During this period, there was a heated rivalry between Subbiah and Edouard Goubert (the leading pro-France politician in the colony), and Goubert's henchmen would engage in lynchings of communist activists. In 1948 the French authorities served an arrest warrant against V. Subbiah, during which he lived in Pondicherry in disguise with the help of Mr. Thiruvengadam, a renowned freedom fighter from Pondicherry . In January 1950 the office of the Communist Party, located in the private residence of V. Subbiah, was burnt down. The police chief was present at the scene, but police did not intervene.

== Leader of independence struggle ==
In mid-1951 the arrest warrant against V. Subbiah was withdrawn. V. Subbiah emerged as a major leader of the independence movement. In a public statement he called for the formation of a united front compromising the Communist Party and other pro-independence groups. V. Subbiah met with Nehru on 13 August 1954 to discuss the prospects of the resistance struggle. On 1 November 1954 France left French India. V. Subbiah returned from exile, meeting a hero's welcome from jubilant masses.

== Post-Independence politics ==
Following the integration of Pondicherry with the Indian Union, V. Subbiah became leader of the Opposition in 1954 and 1963. He served as a member of the Legislative Assembly of Pondicherry 1964-1969 for the Communist Party of India. In the coalition cabinet that governed the union territory 1969–1973 he served as Minister of Agriculture. Subbiah's wife, Saraswathi Subbiah, also served as a legislator of the Communist Party of India in the 1960s.

== Honours ==
Following his death in 1993, the government of Pondicherry erected a bronze statue in his honour in Nellithope. A government highschool in the union territory has been named after him. The Puducherry government also granted 10 million Indian rupees for the reconstruction of his house (that was donated by Subbiah to the people of Pondicherry in his will). The government has stated that the house will be used as an institute for social Sciences and research. On 7 February 2011, Subbiah's birth centenary, the Indian government released a commemorative stamp of him. At the ceremony, Union Minister of State for Parliamentary Affairs V. Narayanasamy praised Subbiah's role in the struggle against French rule in Pondicherry. STATUE LOCATION: Puducherry Government laid a Statue as memorial at Nellithope Signal (Near Maraimalai Adigal salai Cross Road, Nellithope Pondicherry-5).
