= Saraswathi Subbiah =

Indian politician

Saraswathi Subbiah (22 October 1924 – June 2005) was an Indian communist politician. Saraswathi Subbiah took part in the struggle for independence. She studied medicine, but had to interrupt her studies. She represented the Cassucadai assembly constituency between 19 August 1959 and 30 June 1963 for the Communist Party of India. She was also a member of the representative assembly for a year from July 1963. She was also a leader of the National Federation of Indian Women.

Saraswathi Subbiah was the first woman to be awarded the Mahalir Thilagam Award of the Pondicherry government in recognition of her service to the community. She was the wife of veteran communist leader V. Subbiah.
