= Shanmugam Subbaiah =

Indian film distributor

Shanmugam Subbaiah (1930–2012) was a well known film distributor in the Madurai district of Tamil Nadu, India, with an experience of 40 years. His initial film career started off as a ticket checker in the Natraj film theatre in Karaikudi. Then he advanced to become the owner of the same theatre. This was followed by a series of successes which made him start a film distribution unit called 'Venkateshwara Films' in the Thirunalveli district of Tamil Nadu. After that turned out to be a success, he proceeded to Madurai and started another unit called 'Vaideki movies ' as a partnership with noted producer, lyricist and writer Panju Arunachalam. He kept closing and opening distribution units due to internal problems. He retired from film distribution at the end of the 20th century due to chronic health problems.

== Early life ==
Shanmugam was born to Subbaiah, a rich businessman, and Seethai, a rich landlady belonging to the Ilupakudi village, in the Karaikudi district of Tamil Nadu. His mother died some time after his birth and his father married another woman. He was hated by his stepmother who did not even give him food to eat. He was a talented boy and was also a star footballer in his school, but he had to discontinue schooling due to lack of support. He was born a rich boy but live like a poor one. His aunt bore witness to this and made him stay at her house in Aravayal. His uncle got him the job of a ticket checker at the Natraj theater, following his interest in the cinema industry. Due to his determination and hard work, he was liked by the theater owner and was eventually given the post of manager. And thus, he started his film career.

Shanmugam married Manimeghalai of Kandadevi, a village adjoining his hometown and moved to a rented flat in Thirunalveli. He had five children in all. He started a film distribution circuit called ‘Venkateshwara films’ as a joint venture. It was a success. This was his first attempt at distribution. Then he started his lone distribution project in the form of ‘Priya films’. That too was a success. He received a big income and distributed a large number of films. He wanted to replicate his success at an even bigger scale. So he closed that unit and from the rented flat of Thirunalveli, he shifted to his own house in Madurai.

In Madurai, he started a distribution company called ‘Vaideki movies’ with Panju Arunachalam as a partner. It was a major hit. He mostly distributed films of Actors Rajinikanth and Kamal Haasan. He had also distributed the films of Actors Sivaji Ganesan and MG Ramachandran from his previous unit, including the super hit Sivaji film ‘Vazhkai’. He closed this unit and started another one called ‘Gayathri films’. This was his last unit and that too was a major hit.

== Problems ==
It was his film career, which brought him his fortune, that caused his downfall. The tension and pressure of success prevented him from sleeping and breathing properly. This made him take overdoses of sleeping tablets. This cost him dearly in his later days. He lost his hearing and could only see partially. He could not walk properly. His neural system got damaged severely. He tried to fight it but could not. He died on 26 May 2012.
