= Shanmuganathan =

Shanmuganathan may refer to

- Shanmuganathan Ravishankar, LTTE Head of Intelligence
- Kuhan Shanmuganathan, Malaysian field hockey player
- S. Shanmuganathan (Sri Lankan politician)
- V. Shanmuganathan, Governor of Meghalaya
- S. P. Shanmuganathan, Indian politician
- S. Shanmuganathan (Indian politician)
- S. Shanmuganathan (Sri Lankan politician)
- Shanmuganathan Dillidurai, Indian murder victim in Singapore

== See also ==
- Karampon Shanmuganathan Maha Vidyalayam, School in Karampon, Sri Lanka.
