= Fair river sharing =

Problem in game theory

Fair river sharing is a kind of a fair division problem in which the waters of a river has to be divided among countries located along the river. It differs from other fair division problems in that the resource to be divided—the water—flows in one direction—from upstream countries to downstream countries. To attain any desired division, it may be required to limit the consumption of upstream countries, but this may require to give these countries some monetary compensation.

In addition to sharing river water, which is an economic good, it is often required to share river pollution (or the cost of cleaning it), which is an economic bad.

== River sharing in practice ==
There are 148 rivers in the world flowing through two countries, 30 through three, nine through four and 13 through five or more. Some notable examples are:

- The Jordan River, whose sources run from upstream Lebanon and Syria to downstream Israel and Jordan. The attempts of Syria to divert the Jordan River, starting in 1965, are cited as one of the reasons for the Six-Day War. Later, in 1994, the Israel–Jordan peace treaty determined a sharing of the waters between Israel and Jordan, by which Jordan receives 50,000,000 cubic metres (1.8×10^{9} cu ft) water per year.
- The Nile, running from upstream Ethiopia through Sudan to downstream Egypt. There is a long history of disputes over the Nile agreements of 1929 and 1959.
- The Ganges, running from upstream India to downstream Bangladesh. There was controversy over the operation of the Farakka Barrage.
- Between Mexico and the United States, there was controversy over the desalination facility in the Morelos Dam.
- The Mekong runs from China's Yunnan Province to Myanmar, Laos, Thailand, Cambodia, and Vietnam. In 1995, Laos, Thailand, Cambodia, and Vietnam established the Mekong River Commission to assist in the management and coordinated use of the Mekong's resources. In 1996 China and Myanmar became "dialogue partners" of the MRC and the six countries now work together within a cooperative framework.

== Property rights ==
In the international law, there are several conflicting views on the property rights to the river waters.

1. The theory of absolute territorial sovereignty (ATS) states that a country has absolute property rights over any river basin in its territory. So any country may consume some or all of the waters that enter its area, without leaving any water to downstream countries.
2. The theory of unlimited territorial integrity (UTI) states that a country shares the property rights to all the waters from the origin of the river down to its territory. So, a country may not consume all the waters in its territory, since this hurts the right of downstream countries.
3. The theory of territorial integration of all basin states (TIBS) states that a country shares the property rights to all the waters of the river. So each country is entitled to an equal share of the river waters, regardless of its geographic location.

== Efficient water allocation ==
Kilgour and Dinar were the first to suggest a theoretical model for efficient water sharing.

=== The model ===
- The countries are numbered $1,\ldots,n$ according to their location, so that country 1 is the most upstream, then 2, etc.
- The river picks up volume along its course: before each location $i$, an amount $Q_i\geq 0$ of water enters the river. So, country 1 gets $Q_1$ water, country 2 gets $Q_2$ plus the water unconsumed by country 1, and so on.
- Each country $i$ has a benefit function $b_i$ that describes its utility from each amount of water. This function is increasing but strictly concave function, since the countries have diminishing returns. We can define for each country its marginal benefit function $p_i(q_i) := b_i'(q_i)$, which describes the price it is willing to pay for an additional unit of water given its current consumption; it is positive but strictly decreasing.
- Money can be transferred between countries. Countries have quasilinear utility, so a country who consumes $x_i$ water and receives $t_i$ money has utility $b_i(q_i)+t_i$.
- A consumption plan is a vector of water allocations $(q_1,\ldots,q_n)$ and side-payments $(t_1,\ldots,t_n)$. The important aspect of the river sharing setting is that water only flows downstream. Therefore, the total consumption at each location $k$ must be at most the total amount of water that enters this location:

$$\forall k: \sum_{i=1}^k q_i \leq  \sum_{i=1}^k Q_i$$.

Additionally, the sum of the side-payments must be at most 0, so that the divider does not have to subsidize the division.

=== The situation without cooperation ===
Without cooperation, each country maximizes its individual utility. So if a country is an insatiable agent (its benefit function is always increasing), it will consume all the water that enters its region. This may be inefficient. For example, suppose there are two countries with the following benefit functions:

$$b_1(q) = b_2(q) = \sqrt{q}$$

The inflow is $Q_1=2, Q_2=0$. Without cooperation, country 1 will consume 2 units and country 2 will have 0 units: $q_1=2, q_2=0$. Then, the benefits will be $u_1=b_1=\sqrt{2}, u_2=b_2=0$. This is not Pareto efficient: it is possible to allocate 1 unit of water to each country: $q_1=q_2=1$, and transfer e.g. $0.5$ units of money from country 2 to country 1. Then, the utilities will be $u_1=1.5, u_2=0.5$ which are better for both countries.

=== The efficient allocation ===
Because preferences are quasi-linear, an allocation is Pareto-efficient if-and-only-if it maximizes the sum of all agents' benefits and wastes no money. Under the assumption that benefit functions are strictly concave, there is a unique optimal allocation. It structure is simple. Intuitively, the optimal allocation should equalize the marginal benefits of all countries (as in the above example). However, this may be impossible because of the structure of the river: the upstream countries do not have access to downstream waters. For example, in the above two-country example, if the inflow is $Q_1=0.5, Q_2=1.5$, then it is not possible to equalize the marginal benefits, and the optimal allocation is to let each country consume its own water: $q_1=0.5, q_2=1.5$.

Therefore, in the optimal allocation, the marginal benefits are weakly decreasing. The countries are divided to consecutive groups, from upstream to downstream. In each group, the marginal benefit is the same, and between groups, the marginal benefit is decreasing.

The possibility of calculating an optimal allocation allows much more flexibility in water-sharing agreements. Instead of agreeing in advance on fixed water quantities, it is possible to adjust the quantities to the actual amount of water that flows through the river each year. The utility of such flexible agreements has been demonstrated by simulations based on historical of the Ganges flow. The social welfare when using the flexible agreement is always higher than when using the optimal fixed agreement, but the increase is especially significant in times of drought, when the flow is below the average.

== Stable monetary transfers ==
Calculating the efficient water allocation is only the first step in solving a river-sharing problem. The second step is calculating monetary transfers that will incentivize countries to cooperate with the efficient allocation. What monetary transfer vector should be chosen? Ambec and Sprumont study this question using axioms from cooperative game theory.

=== Cooperation when countries are non-satiable ===
According to the ATS doctrine, each country has full rights to the water in its region. Therefore, the monetary payments should guarantee to each country at least the utility-level that it could attain on its own. With non-satiable countries, this level is at least $b_i(Q_i)$. Moreover, we should guarantee to each coalition of countries, at least the utility-level that they could attain by the optimal allocation among the countries in the coalition. This implies a lower bound on the utility of each coalition, called the core lower bound.

According to the UTI doctrine, each country has rights to all water in its region and upstream. These rights are not compatible since their sum is above the total amount of water. However, these rights define an upper bound - the largest utility that a country can hope for. This is the utility it could get alone, if there were no other countries upstream: $b_i(\sum_{j=1}^i Q_i)$. Moreover, the aspiration level of each coalition of countries is the highest utility-level it could attain in the absence of the other countries. This implies an upper bound on the utility of each coalition, called the aspiration upper bound.

There is at most one welfare-distribution that satisfies both the core-lower-bound and the aspiration-upper-bound: it is the downstream incremental distribution. The welfare of each country $i$ should be the stand-alone value of the coalition $\{1,\ldots,i\}$ minus the stand-alone value of the coalition $\{1,\ldots,i-1\}$.

When the benefit functions of all countries are non-satiable, the downstream-incremental-distribution indeed satisfies both the core-lower-bounds and the aspiration-upper-bounds. Hence, this allocation scheme can be seen as a reasonable compromise between the doctrines of ATS and UTI.

=== Cooperation when countries are satiable ===
When the benefit functions are satiable, new coalitional considerations come into play. These are best illustrated by an example.

Suppose there are three countries. Countries 1 and 3 are in a coalition. Country 1 wants to sell water to country 3 in order to increase their group welfare. If country 2 is non-satiable, then 1 cannot leave water to 3, since it will be entirely consumed by 2 along the way. So 1 must consume all its water. In contrast, if country 2 is satiable (and this fact is common knowledge), then it may be worthwhile for 1 to leave some water to 3, even if some of it will be consumed by 2. This increases the welfare of the coalition, but also the welfare of 2. Thus, cooperation is helpful not only for the cooperating countries, but also for the non-cooperating countries!

With satiable countries, each coalition has two different core-lower-bounds:

- The non-cooperative core-lower-bound is the value that the coalition can guarantee to itself based on its own water sources, when the other countries do not cooperate.
- The cooperative core-lower-bound is the value that the coalition can guarantee to itself based on its own water sources, when the other countries cooperate.

As illustrated above, the cooperative core-lower-bound is higher than the non-cooperative core-lower-bound.

The non-cooperative-core is non-empty. Moreover, the downstream-incremental-distribution is the unique solution that satisfies both the non-cooperative-core-lower-bounds and the aspiration-upper-bound.

However, the cooperative-core may be empty: there might be no allocation that satisfies the cooperative-core-lower-bound. Intuitively, it is harder to attain stable agreements, since middle countries might "free-ride" agreements by downstream and upstream countries.

== Sharing a polluted river ==
A river carries not only water but also pollutants coming from agricultural, biological and industrial waste. River pollution is a negative externality: when an upstream country pollutes a river, this creates external cleaning costs for downstream countries. This externality may result in over-pollution by the upstream countries. Theoretically, by the Coase theorem, we could expect the countries to negotiate and achieve a deal in which polluting countries will agree to reduce the level of pollution for an appropriate monetary compensation. However, in practice this does not always happen.

=== Empirical evidence and case-studies ===
Evidence from various international rivers shows that, at water quality monitoring stations immediately upstream of international borders, the pollution levels are more than 40% higher than the average levels at control stations. This may imply that countries do not cooperate for pollution reduction, and the reason for this may be the unclearness in property rights.

See and and for other empirical studies.

Dong, Ni, Wang and Meidan Sun discuss the Baiyang Lake, which was polluted by a tree of 13 counties and townships. To clean the river and its sources, 13 wastewater treatment plants were built in the region. The authors discuss different theoretic models for sharing the costs of these buildings among the townships and counties, but mention that at the end the costs were not shared but rather paid by the Baoding municipal government, since the polluters did not have an incentive to pay.

Hophmayer-Tokich and Kliot present two case studies from Israel where municipalities who suffer from water pollution initiated cooperation on wastewater treatment with upstream polluters. The findings suggest that regional cooperation can be an efficient tool in promoting advanced wastewater treatment, and has several advantages: an efficient use of limited resources (financial and land); balancing disparities between municipalities (size, socio-economic features, consciousness and ability of local leaders); and reducing spillover effects. However, some problems were reported in both cases and should be addressed.

Several theoretical models were proposed for the problem.

=== Market model: each agent can freely trade in licenses for emission/pollution ===
Emissions trading is a market-based approach to attain an efficient pollution allocation. It is applicable to general pollution settings; river pollution is a special case. As an example, Montgomery studies a model with $n$ agents each of which emits $e_i$ pollutants, and $m$ locations each of which suffers pollution $q_i$ which is a linear combination of the emissions. The relation between $e$ and $q$ is given by a diffusion matrix $H$, such that: $q = H\cdot e$. In the special case of a linear river presented above, we have $m=n$, and $H$ is a matrix with a triangle of ones.

Efficiency is attained by permitting free trade in licenses. Two kinds of licenses are studied:

- Emission license - a license which directly confers a right to emit pollutants up to a certain rate.
- Pollution license for a given monitoring-point $i$ - a license which confers the right to emit pollutants at a rate which will cause no more than a specified increase at the pollution-level $q_i$. A polluter that affects water quality at a number of points (e.g. an upstream agent) has to hold a portfolio of licenses covering all relevant monitoring-points.

In both markets, free trade can lead to an efficient outcome. However, the market in pollution-licenses is more widely applicable than the market in emission-licenses.

There are several difficulties with the market approach, such as: how should the initial allocation of licenses be determined? How should the final allocation of licenses be enforced? See Emissions trading for more details.

=== Non-cooperative game with money: each agent chooses how much pollution to emit ===
Laan and Moes (2012) describe the polluted-river situation as follows.

- Each country $i = 1,\ldots,n$ can choose a level of emission $e_i$ (e.g., by choosing what factories to have, what waste-disposal system to have, etc.).
- Each country $i$ suffers a level of pollution $q_i$ that depends on the emissions from it and all upstream agents:

$$q_i = \sum_{j=1}^i e_i$$

- Each country $i$ has a benefit function that depends on its emission it creates, $b_i(e_i)$; the marginal benefit is assumed to be positive and strictly decreasing.
- Each country $i$ has a cost function that depends on the pollution it suffers, $c_i(q_i)$; the marginal cost is assumed to be positive and strictly increasing.
- Money can be transferred between countries, and the utility of country $i$ is $b_i(e_i) + c_i(q_i) + t_i$.

Under the above assumptions, there exists a unique optimal emission-vector, in which the social welfare (the sum of benefits minus the sum of costs) is maximized.

There also exists a unique Nash equilibrium emission-vector, in which each country produces the emission best for it given the emissions of the others. The total amount of emission $\sum_i e_i$ in equilibrium is strictly higher than in the optimal situation, in accordance with the empirical findings of Sigman.

For example, suppose there are two countries with the following benefit functions:

$$b_i(e_i) = \sqrt{e_i}$$
$$c_i(q_i) = {q_i}^2$$

The socially-optimal levels are $e_1=0.1621,e_2=0.2968$, and the utilities are $u_1=0.376,u_2=0.334$. The Nash equilibrium levels are $e_1=0.3969,e_2=0.1847$, and the utilities (benefit minus cost) are $u_1=0.473,u_2=0.092$. In equilibrium, the upstream country 1 over-pollutes; this improves its own utility but harms the utility of the downstream country 2.

The main question of interest is: how to make countries reduce pollution to its optimal level? Several solutions have been proposed.

=== Cooperative game with money: each agent chooses what coalition to join for pollution-reduction ===
The cooperative approach deals directly with pollution levels (rather than licenses). The goal is to find monetary transfers that will make it profitable to agents to cooperate and implement the efficient pollution level.

Gengenbach and Weikard and Ansink focus on the stability of voluntary coalitions of countries, that cooperate for pollution-reduction.

van-der-Laan and Moes focus on property rights and the distribution of the gain in social welfare that arises when countries along an international river switch from no cooperation on pollution levels to full cooperation: It is possible to attain the efficient pollution levels by monetary payments. The monetary payments depend on property rights:

- According to the ATS doctrine, each country has a right to pollute as much as it wants inside its territory. So to prevent upstream countries from polluting, the downstream countries must pay them at least as much as required to keep their utility at their equilibrium level. In the above example, ATS implies that 2 should pay 1 at least 0.473-0.376=0.097. The ATS rule says that 2 pays 1 exactly this value, so that the utility of 1 is exactly its equilibrium payoff. This can be generalized to three or more agents using the downstream incremental distribution by which the utility of each group of upstream agents $1,\ldots,i$ is exactly their equilibrium payoff, and all the gains of cooperation between these agents and agent $i+1$ are given to agent $i+1$.
- According to the UTI doctrine, each country has a right to receive clean water and can prevent all countries upstream from it from creating any pollution. So to be able to pollute, the upstream countries must pay the downstream countries at least as much as required to keep their utility at the clean level. In the above example, UTI implies that 1 should pay 2 at least 0.139 - which is its utility when e_{1}=0. The UTI rule says that 1 pays 2 exactly this value, so the utility of 2 is exactly its payoff from a clean incoming river. This can be generalized to three or more agents using an "upstream incremental distribution", by which the utility of each group of downstream agents $i,\ldots,n$ is exactly their optimal payoff from a clean river, and all the gains of cooperation between these agents and agent $i-1$ are given to agent $i-1$.
- According to the TIBS doctrine, all countries have equal rights to the river. One way to interpret this principle is that the utility of each country should be some kind of average between its ATS utility and its UTI utility. For every vector of responsibilities $\alpha := (\alpha_1,\ldots, \alpha_n)$, it is possible to define a TIBS-$\alpha$ rule that gives, to each country, a utility which is an $\alpha$-weighted average of its utilities under UTI and ATS.

This model can be generalized to rivers that are not linear but have a tree-like topology.

=== Cost-sharing models: cleaning-costs are fixed; a central authority decides how to divide them ===
1. Dong, Ni and Wang (extending a previous work by Ni and Wang) assume each agent $i$ has an exogenously given cost $c_i$, caused by the need to clean the river to match environmental standards. This cost is caused by the pollution of the agent itself and all agents upstream to it. The goal is to charge each agent i a vector of payments $x_{ij}$such that $c_j = \sum_{i}x_{ij}$, i.e., the payments of all agents for region j cover the cost of cleaning it.

They suggest three rules for dividing the total costs of pollution among the agents:

- The ATS doctrine implies the Local Responsibility Sharing method, which holds each agent responsible for the costs on its own territory and therefore requires that each agent $i$ pays its own costs $c_i$.
- The UTI doctrine implies the Upstream Equal Sharing method, which recognizes that the costs on the territory of each agent are caused by it and all its upstream agents and thus requires that $c_i$ is divided equally among i and all agents upstream from i.
- An alternative interpretation of the UTI doctrine implies the Downstream Equal Sharing method, which recognizes that the downstream agents enjoy the waters coming from upstream. Moreover, according to some river-sharing models, the enjoy the waters even more than the upstream agents. Therefore they should contribute to clean the water, so $c_i$should be divided equally among i and all agents downstream from i.

Each of these methods can be characterized by some axioms: additivity, efficiency (the payments exactly cover the costs), no blind costs (an agent with zero costs should pay zero - since he does not pollute), independence of upstream/downstream costs, upstream/downstream symmetry, and independence of irrelevant costs. The latter axiom is relevant for non-linear river trees, in which waters from various sources flow into a common lake. It means that the payments by agents in two different branches of the tree should be independent of each other's costs.

In the above models, pollution levels are not specified. Hence, their methods do not reflect the different responsibility of each region in producing the pollution.

2. Alcalde-Unzu, Gomez-Rua and Molis suggest a different rule for cost-sharing, that does take into account the different pollution-production. The underlying idea is that each agent should pay for the pollution it emits. However, the emission levels are not known - only the cleaning-costs $c_i$ are known. The emission levels could be calculated from the cleaning costs using the transfer rate t (a number in [0,1]), as follows:

$$V_i(t,c_1,\ldots,c_n) =
\begin{cases}
{c_i \over 1-t} & \text{if } i=1
\\
{c_i \over 1-t} - {c_{i-1}\over 1-t}t & \text{if } i=2,\ldots,n-1
\\
c_i - {c_{i-1}\over 1-t}t & \text{if } i=n
\end{cases}$$

However, usually t is not known accurately. Upper and lower bounds on t can be estimated from the vector of cleaning-costs. Based on these bounds, it is possible to calculate bounds on the responsibility of upstream agents. Their principles for cost-sharing are:

- Limits of responsibility - the cost paid by each agent for cleaning its own segment is within its limits of responsibility.
- No downstream responsibility - an agent j situated downstream from agent i does not effect the pollution at region i and so does not have to participate in its cleansing.
- Consistent responsibility - the part of the cost of cleaning a segment paid by one agent, relative to the part paid by another agent, is consistent throughout all the segments situated downstream from both agents.
- Monotonicity w.r.t. information on transfer rate - when information on transfer-rate becomes more accurate such that the estimate on the real transfer-rate becomes higher(lower), the amount of waste in any segment for which all its upstream agents are responsible should be weakly higher(lower).

The rule characterized by these principles is called the Upstream Responsibility (UR) rule: it estimates the responsibility of each agent using expected value of the transfer-rate, and charges each agent according to its estimated responsibility.

In a further study they present a different rule called the Expected Upstream Responsibility (EUR) rule: it estimate the expected responsibility of each agent taking the transfer-rate as a random variable, and charges each agent according to its estimated expected responsibility. The two rules are different because the responsibility is a non-linear function of t. In particular, the UR rule is better for upstream countries (it charges them less), and the EUR rule is better for downstream countries.

The UR rule is incentive compatible: it incentivizes countries to reduce their pollution since this always leads to reduced payment. In contrast, the EUR rule might cause a perverse incentive: a country might pay less by polluting more, due to the effect on the estimated transfer rate.
