= Saraswathi Rajamani =

Officer in the Indian National Army

- Born: 11 January 1927; Rangoon, Burma (present day Myanmar)
- Died: 13 January 2018 (aged 91); Peters Colony, Royapettah, Chennai, Tamil Nadu, India
- Known for: Youngest Spy In The INA

Saraswathi Rajamani was a veteran of the Indian National Army (INA). She is well known for her work in the military intelligence wing of the army.

She appeared in a 2016 short film titled 'Voice of an Independent Indian' directed by Kaushik Sridhar available on YouTube.

== Childhood ==
Rajamani was born on 11 January 1927, in Rangoon, Burma (present day Myanmar). Her father owned a gold mine and was one of the richest Indians in Rangoon. Her family was a staunch supporter of the Indian freedom movement and also contributed money to the movement.

As a 16 year old, inspired by Netaji Subhash Chandra Bose’s speech at Rangoon, she donated all her jewelry to the INA. Realizing that the young girl might have donated the jewelry naively, Netaji visited her house to return it. However, Rajamani was adamant that he use it for the army. Impressed by her determination, he renamed her Saraswathi Rajamani.

== Work at the Indian National Army ==
In 1942, Rajamani was recruited to the Rani of Jhansi regiment of the INA and was part of the army's military intelligence wing. She is credited to be the First Indian Female Spy.

During the Second World War, Rajamani was sent as a spy disguised as a worker into the British Military base in Kolkata to get the secrets of British and share them with INA. She played a key role in uncovering Britishers plan to Assassinate Bose during his secret Visit to Indian borders in 1943.

For almost two years, Rajamani and some of her female colleagues masqueraded as boys and gathered intelligence. While posing as a boy, her name was Mani. Once, one of her colleagues was caught by the British troops. To rescue her, Rajamani infiltrated the British camp dressed as a dancer. She drugged the British officers who were in-charge and freed her colleague. While they were escaping, Rajamani was shot on the leg by a British guard but she still managed to avoid capture.

Her work in the army ended when Netaji disbanded the INA after World War II.

== Later years ==
After World War II, Rajamani's family gave away all their wealth, including the gold mine, and returned to India. In 2005, a newspaper reported that she was living in Chennai and although sustained by freedom fighters pension, she was struggling to make ends meet. She appealed to the Tamil Nadu State Government for help. The then Chief Minister of Tamil Nadu, Jayalalithaa provided assistance to her in the form of a gift of ₹5 lakh and a rent-free housing board flat.

She has donated insignia to the INA gallery of the Netaji Subhash Birthplace National Museum in Cuttack, Odisha.

In 2016, the EPIC Channel featured her story in the television series Adrishya. She has written an autobiography that has been published in Hindi under the name Haar Nahi Manungi.

== Death ==
Rajamani died of cardiac arrest on January 13, 2018. Her last rites were held at Peters Colony, Royapettah, Chennai.
