= 2011 Indian Volley League =

The 2011 Indian Volley League season was the debut season of the Indian Volley League, established by Volleyball federation of India in 2011. The season commenced on 29 May 2011 till 24 June 2011. First season was won by Chennai Spikers.

Chennai Spikers were the champions of the inaugural edition of the Indian Volley League.

== Teams ==
Six teams took part in first season of the Indian Volley League.

Team	Arena	City	Territory
Chennai Spikers	Jawaharlal Nehru Stadium	Chennai	Tamil Nadu
Hyderabad Chargers	Kotla Vijay Bhaskar Reddy Indoor Stadium	Hyderabad	Andhra Pradesh
Karnataka Bulls	Sree Kanteerava Indoor Stadium	Bangalore	Karnataka
Kerala Killers			Kerala
Maratha Warriors		Mumbai	Maharashtra
Yanam Tigers	YSR Indoor Stadium	Yanam	Puducherry

Teams

== Points table ==
Position	Team	Played	Won	Lost	Points	Score (For/Against)	Score Quotient	Sets (Won/Lost)	Set Quotient
1	Chennai Spikers	20	15	5	35	1783/1612	1.106	52/25	2.08
2	Hyderabad Chargers	20	13	7	33	1788/1685	1.061	47/31	1.51
3	Yanam Tigers	20	11	9	31	1726/1687	1.023	41/37	1.1
4	Karnataka Bulls	20	9	11	29	1707/1778	0.96	35/43	0.81
5	Maratha Warriors	20	7	13	27	1580/1711	0.923	30/45	0.66
6	Kerala Killers	20	5	15	25	1722/1833	0.939	28/52	0.53

== Awards ==
Award	Player	Team
Most Valuable Player	Naveen Raja Jacob	Kerala Killers
Best Universal	Sanjay Kumar	Karnataka Bulls
Best Setter	K.J. Kapil Dev	Chennai Spikers
Best Blocker	T. Aziz	Maratha Warriors
Best Libero	Vinod Negi	Hyderabad Chargers
Best Attacker	John Christopher	Yanam Tigers

== Matches and results ==
Bangalore

- Venue: Sree Kanteerva Indoor Stadium

Date		Score		Set 1	Set 2	Set 3	Set 4	Set 5	Total
29 May	Maratha Warriors	3–2	Kerala Killers	26–24	22–25	22–25	25–21	15–13	110–108
29 May	Yanam Tigers	3–0	Karnataka Bulls	26–24	25–18	25–22			76–64
29 May	Hyderabad Chargers	3–2	Chennai Spikers	25–16	22–25	23–25	25–22	15–12	110–100
30 May	Maratha Warriors	3–0	Yanam Tigers	25–22	25–21	25–21			75–64
30 May	Kerala Killers	3–2	Hyderabad Chargers	30–28	16–25	25–19	28–30	15–10	114–112
30 May	Chennai Spikers	3–1	Karnataka Bulls	20–25	25–23	26–24	25–19		96–91
31 May	Yanam Tigers	3–0	Kerala Killers	25–17	25–19	25–15			75–51
31 May	Chennai Spikers	3–0	Maratha Warriors	25–22	25–13	25–18			75–53
31 May	Hyderabad Chargers	3–1	Karnataka Bulls	29–27	30–28	23–25	25–16		107–96
1 June	Yanam Tigers	3–1	Hyderabad Charger	25–23	20–25	25–21	25–22		95–87
1 June	Kerala Killers	3–0	Chennai Spikers	25–21	25–23	25–18			75–62
1 June	Maratha Warriors	3–1	Karnataka Bulls	17–25	25–23	26–24	25–23		93–95
2 June	Maratha Warriors	3–1	Hyderabad Chargers	26–24	19–25	25–18	26–24		96–91
2 June	Chennai Spikers	3–1	Yanam Tigers	25–17	24–26	25–23	25–17		99–83
2 June	Karnataka Bulls	3–0	Kerala Killers	25–20	25–21	25–23			75–64

Chennai

- Venue: Jawaharlal Nehru Indoor Stadium

Date		Score		Set 1	Set 2	Set 3	Set 4	Set 5	Total
4 June	Karnataka Bulls	3–1	Chennai Spikers	25–22	21–25	25–18	25–21		96–86
4 June	Hyderabad Charger	3–2	Kerala Killers	25–19	22–25	25–23	27–29	15-08	114–104
4 June	Yanam Tigers	3–0	Maratha Warriors	25–23	26–24	25–20			76–67
5 June	Kerala Killers	3–1	Yanam Tigers	25–22	18–25	25–19	25–22		93–88
5 June	Maratha Warriors	3–2	Chennai Spikers	15–25	25–21	26–24	16–25	15–10	97–105
5 June	Hyderabad Charger	3–0	Karnataka Bulls	25–17	25–15	27–25			77–57
6 June	Kerala Killers	3–2	Maratha Warriors	27–25	22–25	25–13	23–25	15–13	112–101
6 June	Karnataka Bulls	3–2	Yanam Tigers	15–25	25–21	25–20	15–25	25-08	95–99
6 June	Chennai Spikers	3–0	Hyderabad Charger	25–16	25–18	25–15			75–49
7 June	Yanam Tigers	3–1	Hyderabad Charger	25–23	22–25	25–22	23–19	97–89	112–101
7 June	Chennai Spikers	3–2	Kerala Killers	25–23	25–27	25–21	16–25	17–15	108–111
7 June	Maratha Warriors	3–0	Karnataka Bulls	25–13	25–18	25–20			75–51
8 June	Hyderabad Charger	3–0	Maratha Warriors	25–21	25–20	25–17			75–58
8 June	Karnataka Bulls	3–2	Kerala Killers	16–25	13–25	25–23	27–25	15–11	96–109
8 June	Chennai Spikers	3–0	Yanam Tigers	25–23	25–19	25–19			75–61

Yenam

- Venue: YSR Indoor Stadium

Date		Score		Set 1	Set 2	Set 3	Set 4	Set 5	Total
12 June	Chennai Spikers	3–0	Maratha Warriors	25–16	25–18	25–21			75–55
12 June	Yanam Tigers	3–2	Kerala Killers	22–25	26–24	21–25	25–14	15–10	109–98
12 June	Hyderabad Chargers	3–1	Karnataka Bulls	25–22	20–25	25–23	25–23		95–93
13 June	Hyderabad Chargers	3–0	Maratha Warriors	25–21	25–17	25–16			75–54
13 June	Karnataka Bulls	3–2	Kerala Killers	23–25	25–19	27–25	21–25	16–14	112–108
13 June	Chennai Spikers	3–1	Yanam Tigers	20–25	25–20	25–18	27–25		97–88
14 June	Kerala Killers	3–2	Maratha Warriors	23–25	22–25	25–23	28–26	15-07	113–106
14 June	Karnataka Bulls	3–2	Yanam Tigers	17–25	25–15	17–25	25–18	15–11	99–94
14 June	Chennai Spikers	3–2	Hyderabad Chargers	25–19	23–25	29–27	14–25	15–11	106–107
15 June	Chennai Spikers	3–0	Kerala Killers	25–21	25–18	25–14			75–53
15 June	Hyderabad Chargers	3–0	Yanam Tigers	25–12	25–19	25–23			75–54
15 June	Karnataka Bulls	3–0	Maratha Warriors	25–20	25–22	25–17			75–59
16 June	Chennai Spikers	3–1	Karnataka Bulls	25–22	25–19	19–25	25–23		94–89
16 June	Hyderabad Chargers	3–1	Kerala Killers	16–25	25–22	25–23	25–22		91–92
16 June	Yanam Tigers	3–1	Maratha Warriors	16–25	25–21	25–17	25–22		94–85

Hyderabad

- Venue: Kotla Vijay Bhaskar Reddy Indoor Stadium

Date		Score		Set 1	Set 2	Set 3	Set 4	Set 5	Total
20 June	Karnataka Bulls	3–0	Kerala Killers	34–32	32–30	25–14			91–76
20 June	Hyderabad Chargers	3–2	Maratha Warriors	18–25	19–25	25–16	25–15	19–17	106–98
20 June	Yanam Tigers	3–2	Chennai Spikers	23–22	27–25	19–25	25–19	15–12	109–106
21 June	Yanam Tigers	3–1	Maratha Warriors	25–20	23–25	25–13	25–19		98–77
21 June	Chennai Spikers	3–1	Karnataka Bulls	20–25	25–22	25–19	25–19		95–85
21 June	Hyderabad Chargers	3–0	Kerala Killers	25–23	25–17	25–22			75–62
22 June	Yanam Tigers	3–0	Kerala Killers	25–20	25–20	25–19			75–59
22 June	Chennai Spikers	3–0	Maratha Warriors	25–16	25–17	25–19			75–52
22 June	Hyderabad Chargers	3–0	Karnataka Bulls	25–19	25–12	25–21			75–52
23 June	Karnataka Bulls	3–1	Maratha Warriors	17–25	25–20	25–23	29–27		96–95
23 June	Chennai Spikers	3–0	Kerala Killers	33–31	25–19	25–18			83–58
23 June	Hyderabad Chargers	3–1	Yanam Tigers	25–20	25–22	22–25	25–19		97–86
24 June	Maratha Warriors	3–0	Kerala Killer	25–18	25–20	25–14			75–52
24 June	Yanam Tigers	3–2	Karnataka Bulls	25–18	19–25	21–25	25–19	15–12	105–99
24 June	Chennai Spikers	3–1	Hyderabad Chargers	25–19	21–25	25–20	25–17		96–81
