= Yanam Tigers =

- Full name: Yanam Tigers
- Short name: YT
- Nickname: Tigers
- Founded: 2011
- Ground: YSR Indoor Stadium, Yanam (Capacity: 2,000)
- League: Indian Volley League
- 2011: IVL, 3rd
- Website: Volleyball Federation of India Club home page

Yanam Tigers was a franchise volleyball team based in Yanam, Puducherry that played in the Indian Volley League. The team was founded in 2011. Yanam Tigers finished third in the first edition, in 2011.

== Home stadium ==
YSR Indoor Stadium was the home stadium of Yanam Tigers.

== Matches played ==
=== 2011 Indian Volley League ===
This is a list of Matches played by Yanam Tiger in 2011 Indian Volley League.

==== At Bangalore ====
Date		Score		Set 1	Set 2	Set 3	Set 4	Set 5	Total
29 May	Yanam Tigers	3–0	Karnataka Bulls	26–24	25-18	25–22			76–64
31 May	Yanam Tigers	3-0	Kerala Killers	25–17	25-19	25–15			75-51
1 June	Yanam Tigers	3-1	Hyderabad Charger	25–23	20–25	25–21	25-22		95-87
2 June	Chennai Spikers	3-1	Yanam Tigers	25–17	24–26	25–23	25-17		99-83

==== At Chennai ====
Date		Score		Set 1	Set 2	Set 3	Set 4	Set 5	Total
4 June	Yanam Tigers	3–0	Maratha Warriors	25–23	26–24	25–20			76–67
5 June	Kerala Killers	3-1	Yanam Tigers	25–22	18–25	25–19	25–22		93–88
6 June	Karnataka Bulls	3-2	Yanam Tigers	15-25	25–21	25-20	15-25	25-08	95–99
7 June	Yanam Tigers	3-1	Hyderabad Charger	25–23	22–25	25–22	23-19	97-89	112-101
8 June	Chennai Spikers	3-0	Yanam Tigers	25–23	25–19	25–19			75–61

==== At Yanam ====
Date		Score		Set 1	Set 2	Set 3	Set 4	Set 5	Total
12 June	Yanam Tigers	3-2	Kerala Killers	22–25	26–24	21–25	25-14	15-10	109–98
13 June	Chennai Spikers	3-1	Yanam Tigers	20–25	25–20	25–18	27-25		97–88
14 June	Karnataka Bulls	3-2	Yanam Tigers	17–25	25–15	17–25	25-18	15-11	99–94
15 June	Hyderabad Chargers	3-0	Yanam Tigers	25–12	25–19	25–23			75–54
16 June	Yanam Tigers	3-1	Maratha Warriors	16-25	25–21	25–17	25–22		94–85

==== At Hyderabad ====
Date		Score		Set 1	Set 2	Set 3	Set 4	Set 5	Total
20 June	Yanam Tigers	3-2	Chennai Spikers	23–22	27–25	19–25	25-19	15-12	109–106
21 June	Yanam Tigers	3-1	Maratha Warriors	25–20	23–25	25–13	25-19		98–77
22 June	Yanam Tigers	3-0	Kerala Killers	25-20	25-20	25–19			75–59
23 June	Hyderabad Chargers	3-1	Yanam Tigers	25–20	25–22	22-25	25–19		97–86
24 June	Yanam Tigers	3-2	Karnataka Bulls	25-18	19-25	21-25	25–19	15-12	105–99
