= YSR Indoor Stadium =

Sports venue in Yanam, India

Coordinates: 16.7340°N 82.2101°E

- Indoor Stadium
- Interactive map of YSR Indoor Stadium
- Location: Yanam, Puduchery, India
- Owner: Yanam Sports and Games Development Authority
- Operator: Yanam Sports and Games Development Authority
- Capacity: 2,000

Construction
- Built: 2010
- Opened: November 2010
- Cost: ₹22 crore

Tenant
- 2011 Indian Volley League

YSR Indoor Stadium is an indoor sporting arena located in Yanam, which is part of Union Territory of Pondichery, India. The capacity of the arena is 2,000 people. It hosted some events for the Indian Volley League in 2011.

The stadium is owned and maintained by Yanam Sports and Games Development Authority. It has facilities for hosting indoor game including volleyball, badminton, and basketball. The stadium is fully air-air-conditioned and has all the modern facilities of hosting indoor games. The stadium has hosted Junior National Badminton Championships, South Zone basketball championships, and a few volleyball and basketball matches.

The stadium came into the national picture in 2011 when the Indian Volley League's third leg matches were held, and it also became the home of the Yanam Tigers.

== Indian Volley League matches ==
=== 2011 Indian Volley League ===
This is a list of Indian Volley League matches hosted in Yanam.

Date		Score		Set 1	Set 2	Set 3	Set 4	Set 5	Total
12 June	Chennai Spikers	3-0	Maratha Warriors	25–16	25–18	25–21			75–55
12 June	Yanam Tigers	3-2	Kerala Killers	22–25	26–24	21–25	25-14	15-10	109–98
12 June	Hyderabad Chargers	3-1	Karnataka Bulls	25–22	20–25	25–23	25-23		95–93
13 June	Hyderabad Chargers	3-0	Maratha Warriors	25–21	25–17	25–16			75–54
13 June	Karnataka Bulls	3-2	Kerala Killers	23–25	25–19	27–25	21-25	16-14	112–108
13 June	Chennai Spikers	3-1	Yanam Tigers	20–25	25–20	25–18	27-25		97–88
14 June	Kerala Killers	3-2	Maratha Warriors	23-25	22–25	25–23	28-26	15-07	113–106
14 June	Karnataka Bulls	3-2	Yanam Tigers	17–25	25–15	17–25	25-18	15-11	99–94
14 June	Chennai Spikers	3-2	Hyderabad Chargers	25–19	23-25	29–27	14-25	15-11	106–107
15 June	Chennai Spikers	3-0	Kerala Killers	25–21	25–18	25–14			75–53
15 June	Hyderabad Chargers	3-0	Yanam Tigers	25–12	25–19	25–23			75–54
15 June	Karnataka Bulls	3-0	Maratha Warriors	25–20	25–22	25–17			75–59
16 June	Chennai Spikers	3-1	Karnataka Bulls	25–22	25–19	19-25	25–23		94-89
16 June	Hyderabad Chargers	3-1	Kerala Killers	16-25	25–22	25–23	25–22		91–92
16 June	Yanam Tigers	3-1	Maratha Warriors	16-25	25–21	25–17	25–22		94–85
