= Puducherry Road Transport Corporation =

- Founded: 1988
- Headquarters: Marimalai Adigal Salai, Puducherry
- Service area: Puducherry, Karaikal, Mahé, Yanam, Tamil Nadu, Kerala, Andhra Pradesh, Karnataka.
- Fleet: 141
- Operator: Government of Puducherry
- Website: PRTC

The Puducherry Road Transport Corporation (PRTC) is the government transport corporation in the union territory of Puducherry that provides services in all the four regions of Puducherry, namely Pondicherry, Karaikal, Mahé and Yanam.

== History ==
Pondicherry Tourism Development Corporation Limited (PTDC) was incorporated during February 1986 to promote tourism in the union territory of Puducherry. With the introduction of transport service from March 1988, the corporation was converted into Pondicherry Tourism and Transport Development Corporation Limited (PT&TDC) with effect from December 1992. The corporation operates inter-state buses on 55 routes throughout the territory, providing direct services to important tourist destinations in all the southern states of India. PT&TDC has paid up capital of about Rs.28.42 crores and was incurring substantial annual losses in the tourism sector. Hence, the corporation was bifurcated with effect from 1 April 2005 into the Puducherry Road Transport Corporation (PRTC) and Pondicherry Tourism Development Corporation (PTDC), in order to focus on diversification and expansion projects.

== Fleet ==
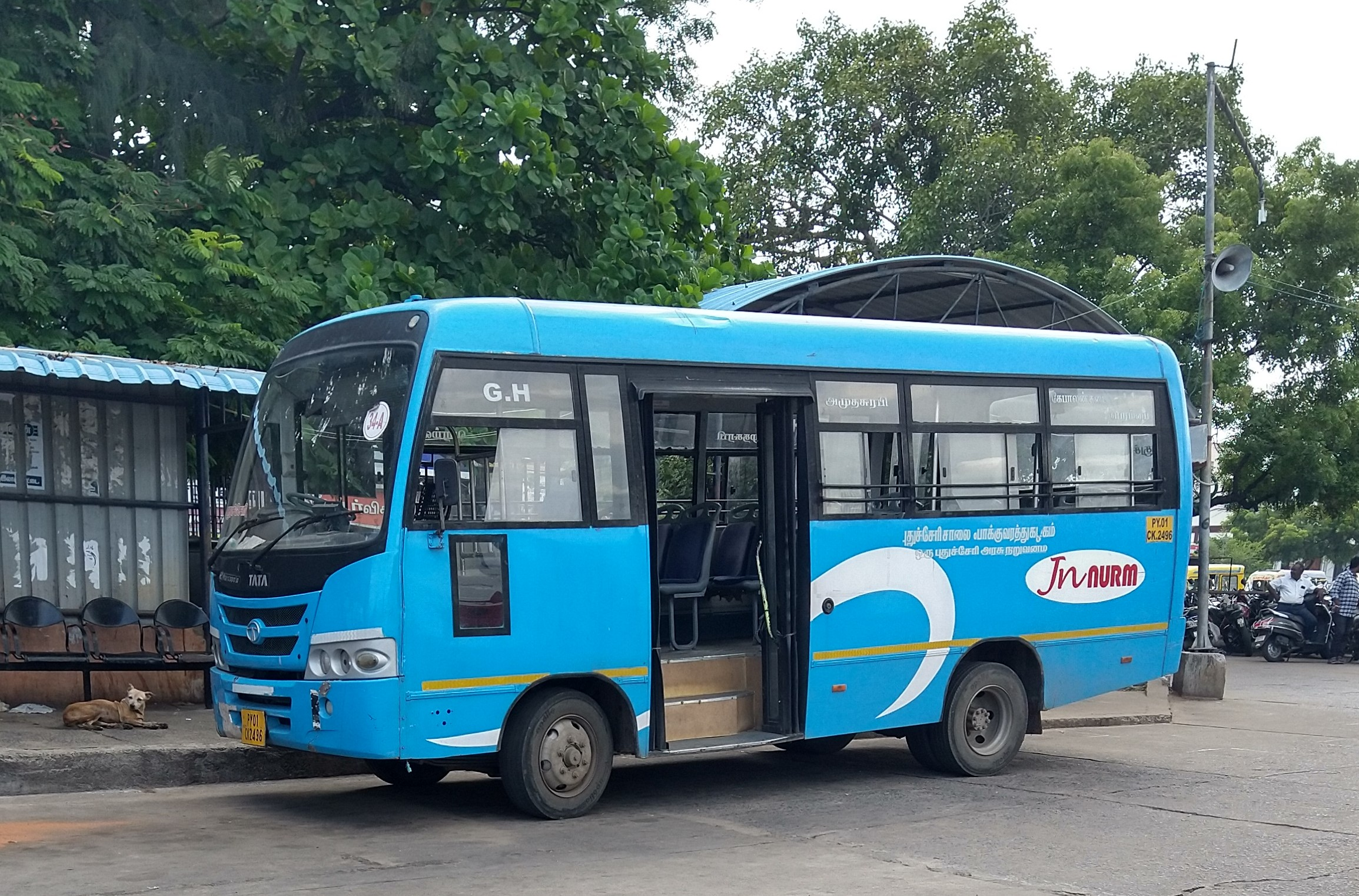
A PRTC mini-bus at the Rajiv Gandhi Bus Station

PRTC operates over 139 buses in various Inter-state and Intra-City routes. It operates around 40 JNNURM buses in all the 4 territories, viz: Puducherry, Karaikal, Mahe and Yanam, with a majority of them operating in Puducherry. The fleet with PRTC is entirely from Ashok Leyland.

== Routes ==
It operates various inter-state routes, connecting important cities of Tamil Nadu and Kerala like Chennai, Tindivanam, Coimbatore, Tirunelveli, Kumbakonam, Kumily, Velankanni, Nagapattinam, Mayiladuthurai, Neyveli, Chidambaram, Viluppuram, Cuddalore, Palakkad, Malappuram, Kozhikode from its towns of Puducherry and Karaikal. It also operates to Mahe, Tirupathi, Bengaluru from Puducherry, which till date, are its only services outside Tamil Nadu. Off late, they have been adding more and more services in Mahe and Yanam. As of now, they are operating 3 JnNURM town buses, each in Mahe and Yanam.

== Class of services ==
PRTC is now running the following types of buses, connecting different places in its 4 regions as well as to the neighboring states.

- City Ordinary - 2*2 City bus and 3*2 City bus
- City Semi Low Floor - 2*2 JnNURM bus
- Express - 3*2 Mofussil Bus
- Deluxe - 2*2 Non-Push Back
- Ultra Deluxe - 2*2 Push Back
- Volvo buses - 2*2 PDYCHN & PDYCUD

== Future plans and expansion ==
PRTC has received a fresh batch of 25 buses from JnNURM for the city operations. Around 25 Semi-Low-Floor buses are being operated to destinations in and around the Pondicherry. It received another fresh batch of 14 new Semi-Low- Floor buses and they were inaugurated in the month of January, 3 out of which are running in Karaikal and Mahe, 2 in Yanam and the rest doing its service in Puducherry Urban Area in new routes.

There is also a proposal to replace all the inter-state buses. All of them have done more than 10 lakh km and are very old. Very recently PRTC has added 4 Ultra Delux buses of Prakash P8000 Model on the Pondicherry–Mahé and Pondicherry–Nagercoil routes. Another 3 Ultra Delux buses are expected to be added to the fleet soon. They also have replaced 30 of their age old inter-city bus fleet with new buses built by TVR Coach on Ashok Leyland platform and they also have procured 200 electronic ticket vending machines enabled with GPS and GPRS as a part of preventing revenue leakage.

Very recently they have invited tenders for procurement of 50 buses under JnNURM - II. They include 20 Standard Non-AC buses, 20 Mini Non-AC buses. They are expected to hit the road sometime in 2014 and are to be deployed in new local routes.

== Volvo Buses ==
PRTC also operates 2 Volvo AC buses to two different locations. They were procured in 2006–2007, but in the year 2010–11 they were withdrawn due to an accident and a court order to halt the service between Puducherry (city) and Bengaluru. Now, due to the efforts of the new general manager and the managing director, the buses have been sent to the Volvo factory and have been re-furbished with a complete FC. Both the buses have been delivered back to PRTC and has started its service in Puducherry –Chennai route. 10 new Volvo buses to ply in Puducherry and to Chennai .A fleet of brand new Volvo buses rolled out to enhance the travel experience of the commuters on Friday[12-07-2014]. Chief Minister N. Rangasamy flagged off the 10 swanky, air-conditioned buses of the Puducherry Road Transport (PRTC) Corporation Limited here.

== See also ==
- Andhra Pradesh State Road Transport Corporation
- Tamil Nadu State Transport Corporation
- State Express Transport Corporation (Tamil Nadu)
- Metropolitan Transport Corporation (Chennai)
