= Yanam Śrī Rājarājeśwara Kalyāṇōtsavam =

Yanam Śrī Rājarājeśwara Kalyāṇōtsavām at Yanam is an annual festival at Yanam Sivalayam celebrated for twenty days in the month of Māgha (January/February). Kalyāṇam will be performed on Māgha Śuddha Dvādaśi i.e., on the twelfth day of the festival. Lord's holy consort is Goddess Śrī Rājarājeśwari Ammavāru.

== History ==
Lord Śrī Rājarājeśwara Temple is at Yanam on the bank of Atreya Godavari (also known as Corangi River). This temple was built by the Chalukya kings of Rajamahendravaram (Rajahmundry) in the 15th century. The sculptures of those period are present in this temple. Though Kalyāṇōtsavām and Rathōstavam has been performed since old days. It is carried by devotees singing slogans and bhajans.

The Kalyāṇōtsavam Festival is celebrated in the month of Māgha (January/February) every year by the people of Yanam. The festival commences on Māgha Śuddha Pāḍyami, Lord Śrī Rājarājeśwara will be made bridegroom and then a procession on streets with different chariots each day occurs and Kalyāṇam, Rathōtsavam and Triśūlatīrtham are the important events of the festival. Vāhana Samprōkshaṇa (ritual cleansing of the chariot) will be done by priests every day for each Vāhanam used for procession. During the festival days, devotees come to Yanam to receive the blessings of Lord Śrī Rājarājeśwara.

== Peṇḍli Kumāruḍu Utsavālu ==
The festival commences on Māgha Śuddha Pāḍyami with bridegroom making of Lord Śrī Rājarājeśwara Swāmivāru for his Kalyāṇam. This marks the beginning of the festival. The Lord's chariot procession (స్వామివారి వాహన ఊరేగింపు) will also commence from this day. Then a procession on streets with different chariots each day occurs for ten days until Lord's Kalyāṇōtsavam .

=== Pushpaka Vāhanam ===
Morning, Lord Śrī Rājarājeśwara Swāmivāru is made as bridegroom for his Kalyāṇam and Vāhanam of the day will be Pushpaka Vāhanam (ఫుష్పక వాహనము), i.e., The Pushpaka Chariot. The Sponsor of the day (ఉత్సవ నిర్వాహకులు) will be Vudattu family and currently held by Vudattu Sambamurty.

=== Pushpaka Vāhanam ===
On the second day of the Kalyāṇōtsavam Festival, Vāhanam of the day will be Pushpaka Vāhanam (ఫుష్పక వాహనము), i.e., The Pushpaka Chariot. The Sponsor of the day will be Chekuri family and currently held by Chekuri Ramarao.

=== Mayūra Vāhanam ===
On the third day of the Kalyāṇōtsavam Festival, Vāhanam of the day will be Mayūra Vāhanam (మయూర వాహనము), i.e., The Peacock Chariot. The Sponsor of the day will be Gutti family and currently held by Gutti Ramalingayya & Sons.

=== Pushpa Vāhanam ===
On the fourth day of the Kalyāṇōtsavam Festival, Vāhanam of the day will be Pushpa Vāhanam (ఫుష్ప వాహనము), i.e., The Pushpaka Chariot. The Sponsor of the day will be Majety family and currently held by Majety Somaraju & Sons.

=== Hariṇi Vāhanam ===
On the fifth day of the Kalyāṇōtsavam Festival, Vāhanam of the day will be Hariṇi Vāhanam (హరిణి వాహనము), i.e., The Deer Chariot. The Sponsor of the day will be Rajaka Sangham

=== Simha Vāhanam ===
On the sixth day of the Kalyāṇōtsavam Festival, Vāhanam of the day will be Simha Vāhanam (సింహ వాహనము), i.e., The Lion Chariot. The Sponsor of the day will be Tailors Sangham.

=== Hamsa Vāhanam ===
On the seventh day of the Kalyāṇōtsavam Festival, Vāhanam of the day will be Hamsa Vāhanam (హంస వాహనము), i.e., The Swan Chariot. The Sponsor of the day will be Gajula family and currently held by Gajala Venkata Suryaramalingeswararao.

=== Pushpaka Vāhanam ===
On the eighth day of the Kalyāṇōtsavam Festival, Vāhanam of the day will be Pushpaka Vāhanam (ఫుష్పక వాహనము), i.e., The Pushpaka Chariot. The Sponsor of the day will be Majety family and currently held by Majety Subbarao & Sons.

=== Aśva Vāhanam ===
On the ninth day of the Kalyāṇōtsavam Festival, Vāhanam of the day will be Aśva Vāhanam (అశ్వ వాహనము), i.e., The Horse Chariot. The Sponsor of the day will be Upaadhyaaya Sangham.

=== Nandi Vāhanam and Dwajārōhaṇam ===
On the tenth day of the Kalyāṇōtsavam Festival, Vāhanam of the day will be Nandi Vāhanam (నంది వాహనము), i.e., The Bullock Chariot. The Sponsor of the day will be Manyam family and currently held by Sri Raja Manyam kanakayya Zamindar.

Dwajārōhaṇam (flag-hoisting) will be held on that night after Vāhana Seva by hoisting a flag (Garuda Dhwaja) with a picture of Nandi (vehicle of Lord Siva) on the top of the Dwaja Sthambham (flagpole) in front of the sanctum santorum. It is said to be a symbolic significance of formal invitation to all the deities to attend the Kalyāṇōtsavām festival.

== Kalyāṇōtsavam and Gaja Vāhanam ==
On the eleventh day (Māgha Śuddha Dvādaśi)of the Kalyāṇōtsavam Festival, Kalyāṇam performed for Lord (under sponsorship of Manyam family). Vāhanam of the day will be Gaja Vāhanam (గజ వాహనము), i.e., The Elephant Chariot. The Sponsor of the day (ఉత్సవ నిర్వాహకులు) will be Viswabrahmaan Sangham.

== Bhūta Vāhanam ==
On the twelfth day of the Kalyāṇōtsavam Festival, Vāhanam of the day will be Bhūta Vāhanam (భూత వాహనము). The Sponsor of the day (ఉత్సవ నిర్వాహకులు) will be Katta family of Katta Srinivasarao. The 'Vāhana Seva' ends on this day.

== Rathōstavam ==
On the thirteenth day (Māgha Śuddha Chaturdaśi) of the Kalyāṇōtsavam Festival there will be Rathōstavam. The Sponsor of the day (ఉత్సవ నిర్వాహకులు) will be Kasireddy family.

== Triśūla Tīrtham ==
On the fourteenth day (Māgha Pourṇami) of the Kalyāṇōtsavam Festival, in the morning there will be Triśūla Tīrtham, also known as Triśūla Snānam (Holy dip of Triśūlam) which will be performed in the Gautami Godavari River. The Sponsor of the day (ఉత్సవ నిర్వాహకులు) will be Maddimsetty family. Later there will be procession of Lord.

== Pushpa Yaagam ==
From the fifteenth day (Māgha Bahuḷa Pāḍyami) of the Kalyāṇōtsavam Festival, there will be Pushpa Yaagam (పుష్పయాగము) i.e., The Flower Ritual of Sacrifice for five days.

== See also ==
- Yanam Venkanna Babu Kalyāṇōtsavam
- Yanam Venkanna Babu Brahmōtsavam
