= Jawaharlal Nehru National Urban Renewal Mission =

2005–2014 city-modernisation scheme in India

Jawaharlal Nehru National Urban Renewal Mission (JNNURM)

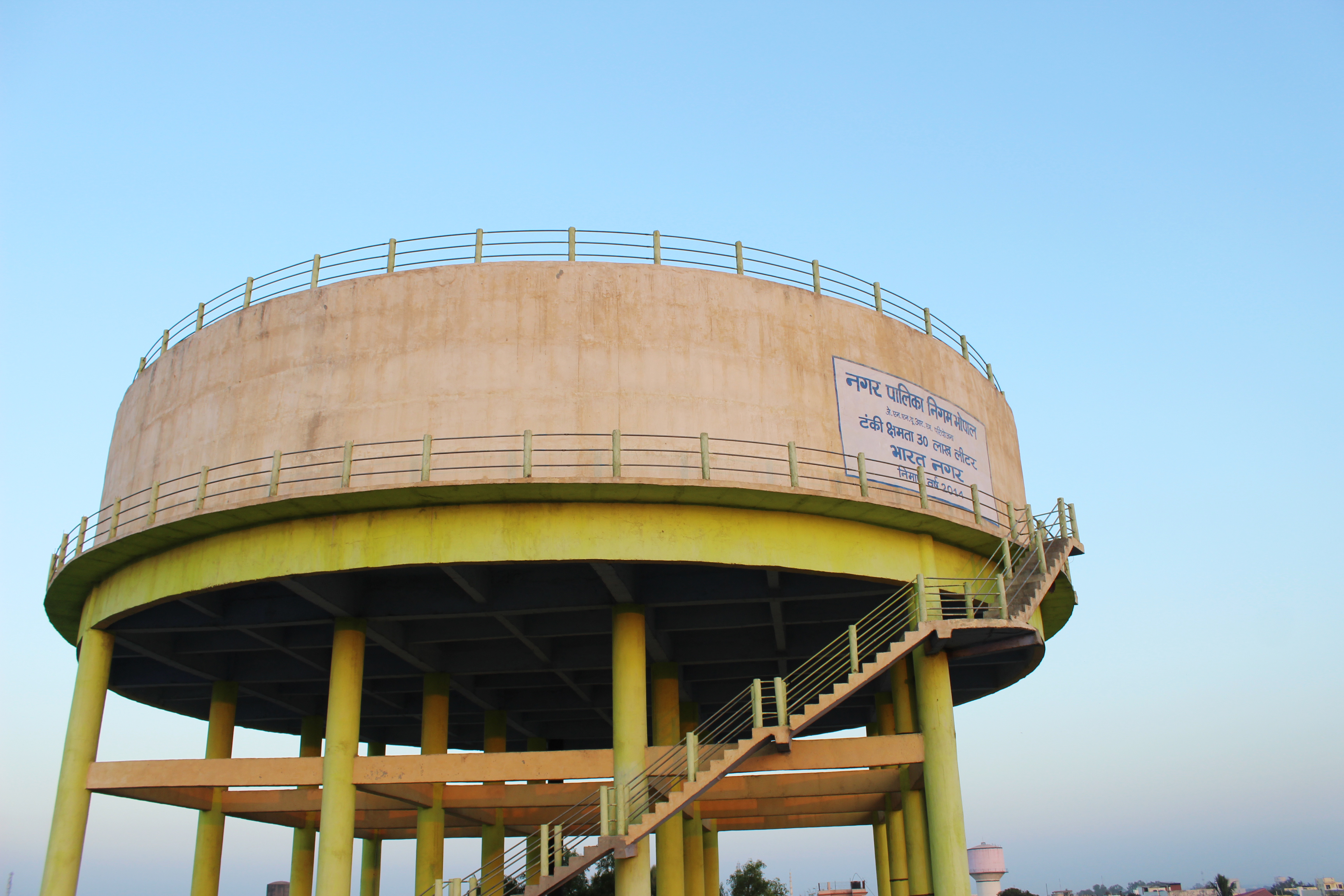
- Overhead Water Tank Capacity 3 million litres, at Barat Nagar BHEL under Bhopal Municipal Corporation
- Country: India
- Launched: 3 December 2005
- Closed: 2014
- Status: Succeeded by AMRUT

Jawaharlal Nehru National Urban Renewal Mission (JNNURM) was a massive city-modernization scheme launched by the Government of India under the Ministry of Urban Development. It envisaged a total investment of over $20 billion over seven years. It was named after Jawaharlal Nehru, the first Prime Minister of India. The scheme aimed to encourage reforms and fast-track planned development of identified cities. The focus was on efficiency in urban infrastructure and service delivery mechanisms, community participation, and accountability of urban local bodies and parastatal agencies towards citizens. The scheme was officially inaugurated by Prime Minister Manmohan Singh on 3 December 2005.

== Structure ==
=== Sub-missions ===
JNNURM primarily incorporates two sub-missions into its program:

- The Sub-Mission for Urban Infrastructure and Governance administered by the Ministry of Urban Development, with a focus on water supply and sanitation, solid waste management, road network, urban transport and redevelopment of old city areas.
- The Sub-Mission for Basic Services to the Urban Poor (BSUP) administered by the Ministry of Housing and Urban Poverty Alleviation with a focus on integrated development of slums.

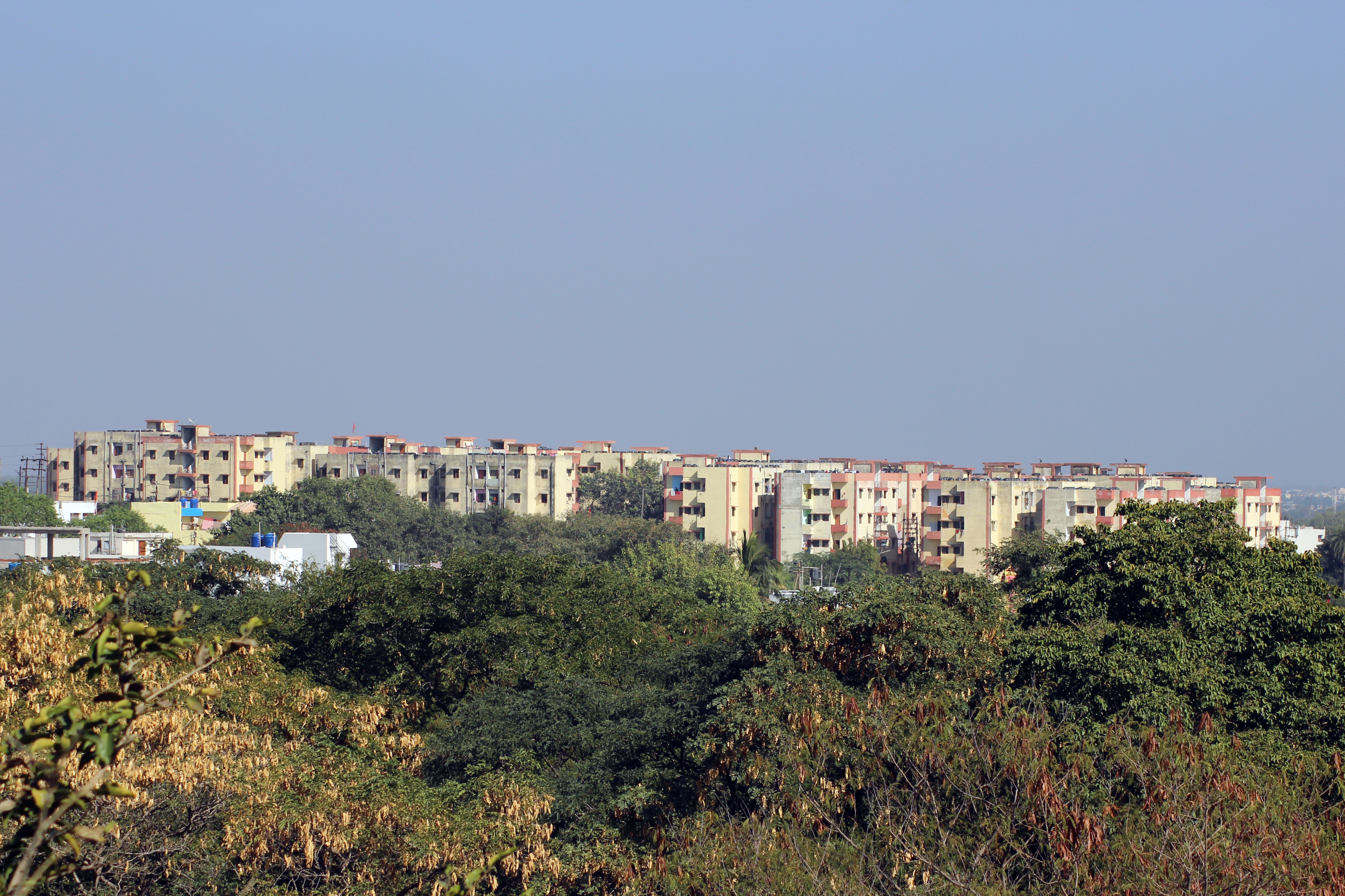
Integrated Housing and Slum Development Programme (IHSDP) under JNNRUM for slum improvement and rehabilitation

In addition to this, it has two further components:

- The Sub-Mission for Urban Infrastructure Development Scheme for Small & Medium Towns (UIDSSMT) administered by the Ministry of Urban Development, with a focus on subsuming the schemes of Integrated Development of Small and Medium Towns (IDSMT) and Accelerated Urban Water Supply Programme (AUWSP) which aim at planned urban infrastructural improvement in towns and cities under its purview.
- The Sub-Mission for Integrated Housing and Slum Development Programme (IHSDP) administered by Ministry of Housing and Urban Poverty Alleviation (MHUPA) was envisaged and brought into effect in 1993–94 in accordance with providing the entire population with safe and adequate water supply facilities. This sub-mission was mainly implemented in towns with populations less than 20,000 as per the 1991 census.

=== Objectives ===
- Focused attention relating to infrastructural services in the context of integrated development is to be covered under the mission.
- Make efficient and increase self-sustaining capabilities of cities as per the sector proving infrastructural services by securing the linkages between asset creation and asset management
- Ensure adequate investment of funds to fulfill deficiencies in the urban infrastructural services.
- Planned development of identified cities including peri-urban areas, out growths, urban corridors, so that urbanization takes place in a dispersed manner.
- Scale up delivery of civic amenities and provision of utilities with emphasis on universal access to urban poor.
- To take up urban renewal programme, i.e., re-development of inner (old) cities area to reduce congestion.
- Provision of basic services to the urban poor including security of tenure at affordable prices, improved housing, water supply and sanitation, and ensuring delivery of other existing universal services of the government for education, health and social security.

=== Duration ===
The duration of the mission was initially seven years beginning from December 2005. During this period, the mission sought to ensure sustainable development of participating cities. An evaluation of the experience of implementation of the mission would be undertaken before the end of the Eleventh Five Year Plan in 2012. The duration of the mission was extended by two more years: until 31 March 2014.

funds are channeled through state-level agencies, where grants from the central and state governments are pooled and passed on as grants or soft loans to cities provided that they have prepared development strategies and that the investments identified fit within these strategies. The mission emphasises transparency and accountability. It supports public-private partnerships and cost recovery to make service providers financially self-sustaining. The share of grant funding by the central government can vary from 35% in the largest cities to up to 90% in cities in the Northeast. Most cities receive grants covering 50% or 80% of costs depending on size. Capacity building is also included in the mission to assist urban local bodies to prepare strategies and projects.

Currently, ten projects are covered by JNNURM funds pertaining to road network, storm water drains, bus rapid transit system, water supply, solid waste management, sewage treatment, river and lake improvement, slum improvement and rehabilitation, all fall under its scope.

==== Strategy of the Mission ====
1. Preparing City Development Plan: Every city will be expected to formulate a City Development Plan (CDP) indicating policies, programmes and strategies, and financing plans.
2. Preparing Projects: The CDP would facilitate identification of projects. The Urban Local Bodies (ULBs) / parastatal agencies will be required to prepare Detailed Project Reports (DPRs) for undertaking projects in the identified spheres.
3. Release and Leveraging of Funds: It is expected that the JNNURM assistance would serve to catalyse the flow of investment into the urban infrastructure sector across the country. Funds from the Central and State Government will flow directly to the nodal agency designated by the State, as grants-in-aid.
4. Incorporating Private Sector Efficiencies: In order to optimise the life-cycle costs over the planning horizon, private sector efficiencies can be inducted in development, management, implementation and financing of projects, through Public Private Partnership (PPP) arrangements.

==== Expected Outcomes ====
1. Modern and transparent budgeting, accounting, financial management systems, designed and adopted for all urban service and governance functions.
2. City-wide framework for planning and governance will be established and become operational.
3. All urban residents will be able to obtain access to a basic level of urban services.
4. Financially self-sustaining agencies for urban governance and service delivery will be established, through reforms to major revenue instruments.
5. Local services and governance will be conducted in a manner that is transparent and accountable to citizens.
6. E-governance applications will be introduced in core functions of ULBs/Parastatal resulting in reduced cost and time of service delivery processes.

== Coverage ==
As per the JNNURM guidelines, only select cities/Urban Agglomerations (UAs) as per 2001 Census have been chosen for the implementation of the programme as per norms/criteria mentioned below:

A	Cities/UAs with 4 million plus population as per 2001 census	07
B	Cities/UAs with 1 million plus but less than 4 million population as per 2001 census	28
C	Selected cities/UAs (state capitals and other cities/UAs of religious/historic and touristic importance)	28

== Implementation ==
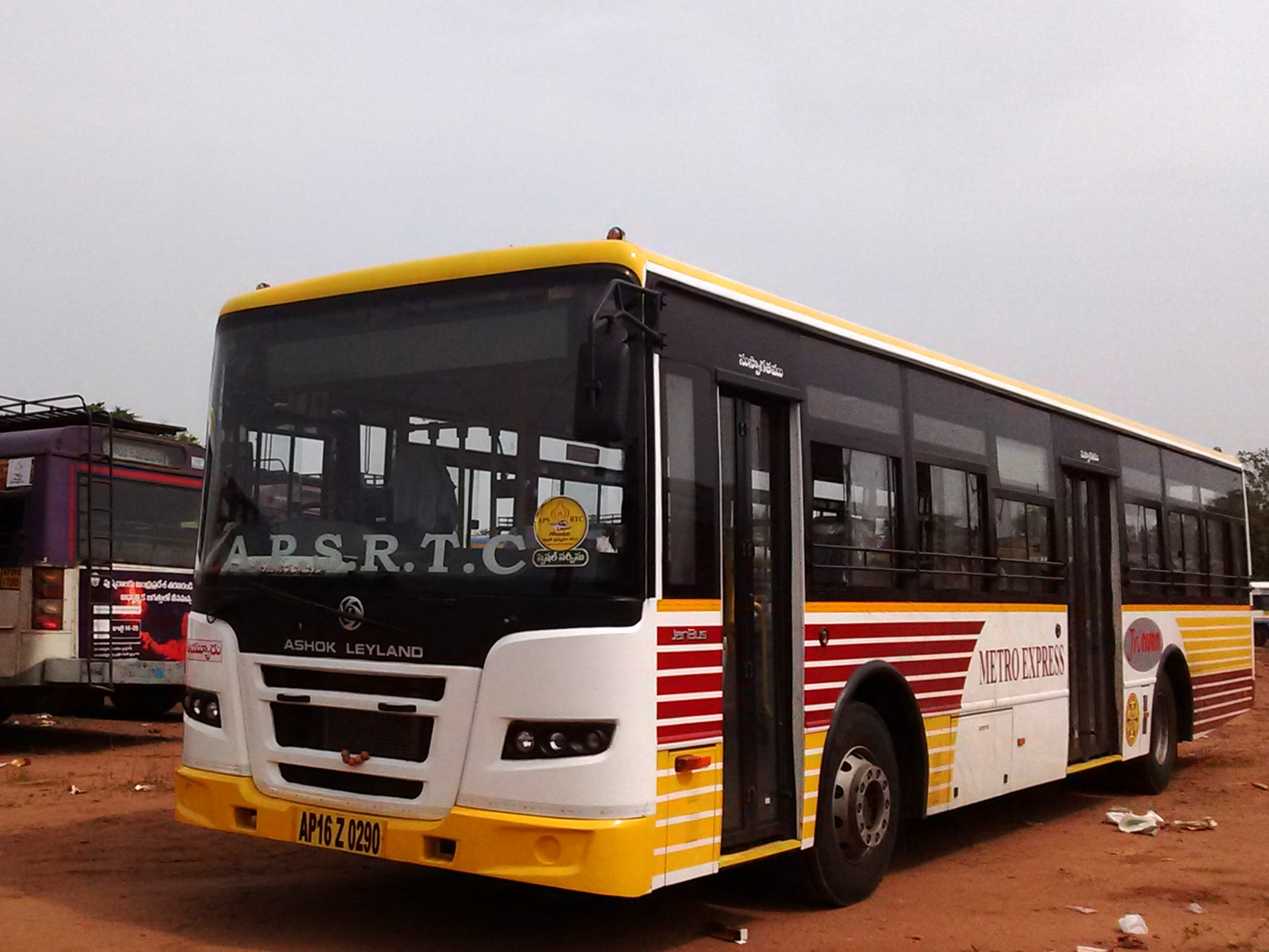
JNNURM city bus in Vijayawada

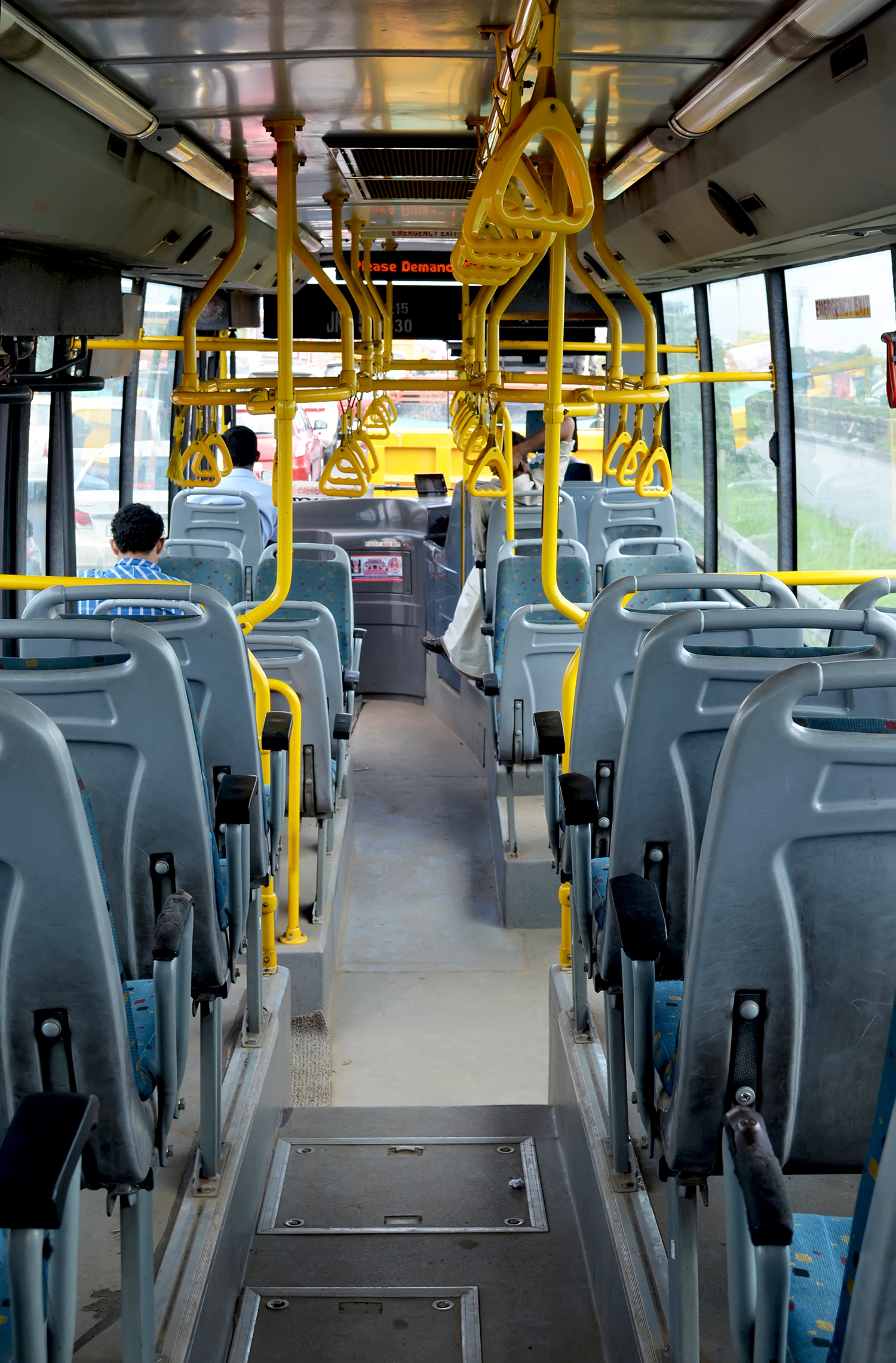
Interior of Low Floor Buses

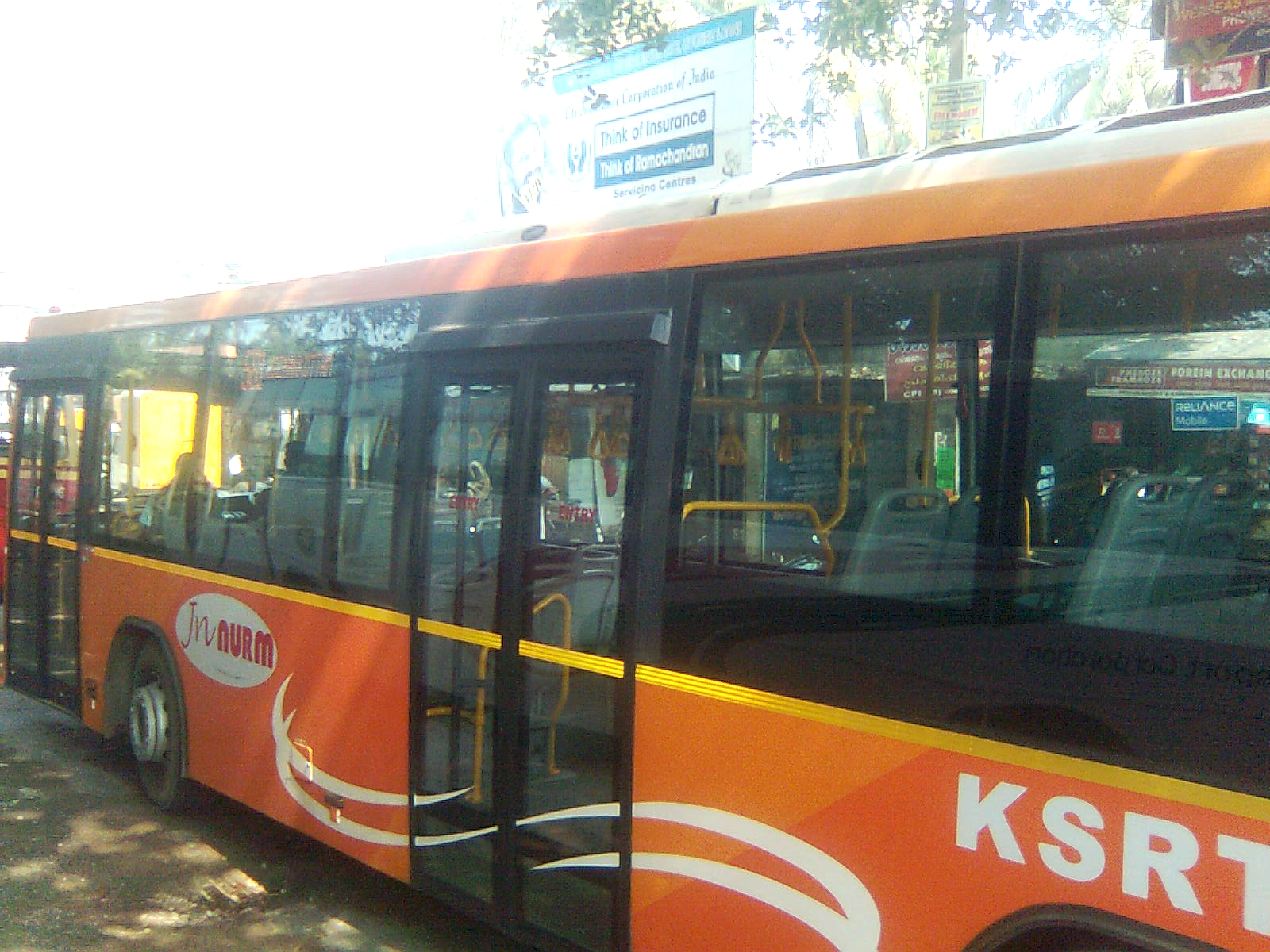
Low floor bus from JNNURM for Kochi and Thiruvananthapuram

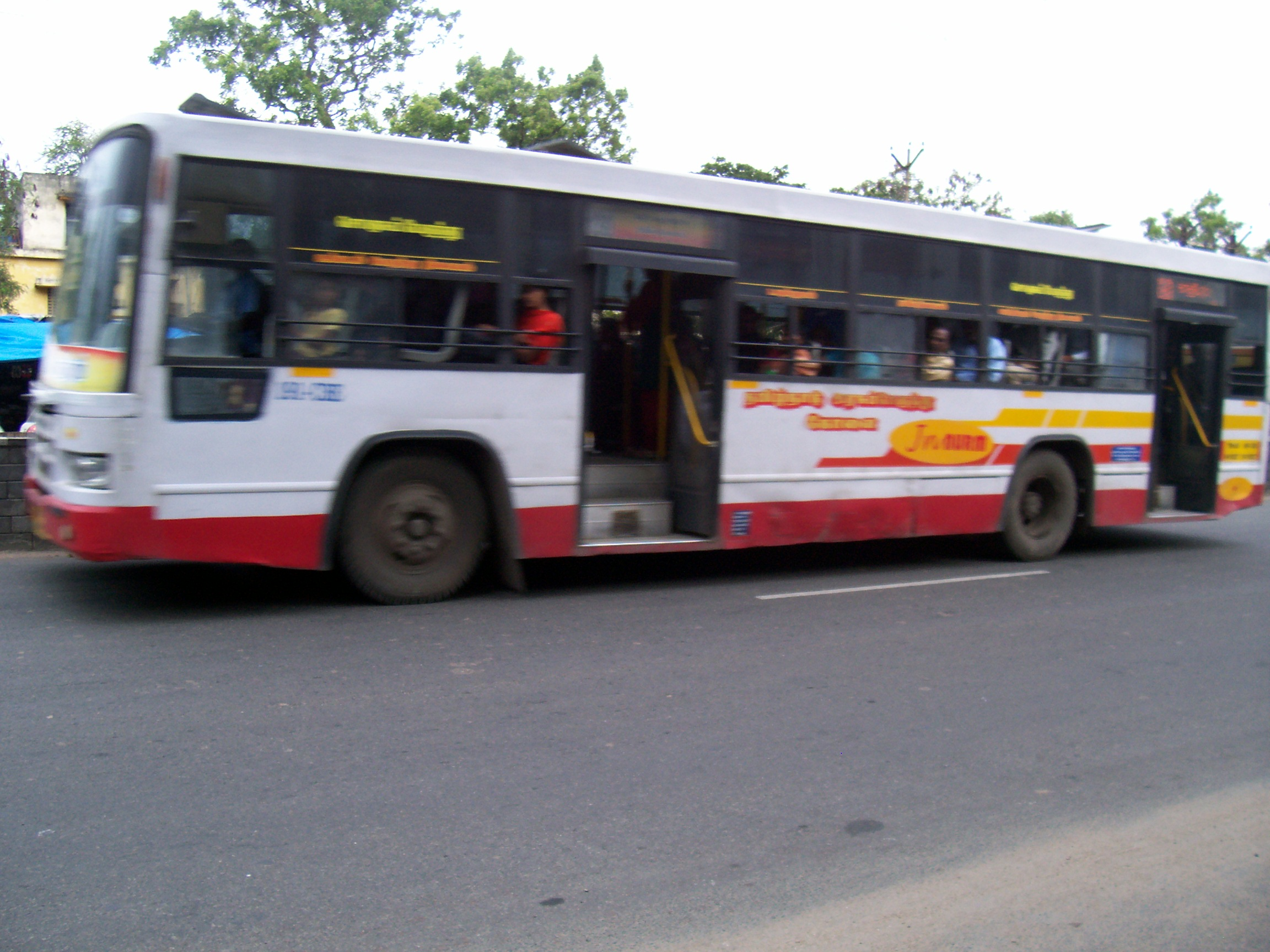
Semi-Low Floor (SLF) bus from JNNURM for Chennai, Coimbatore, Madurai cities & to Puducherry.

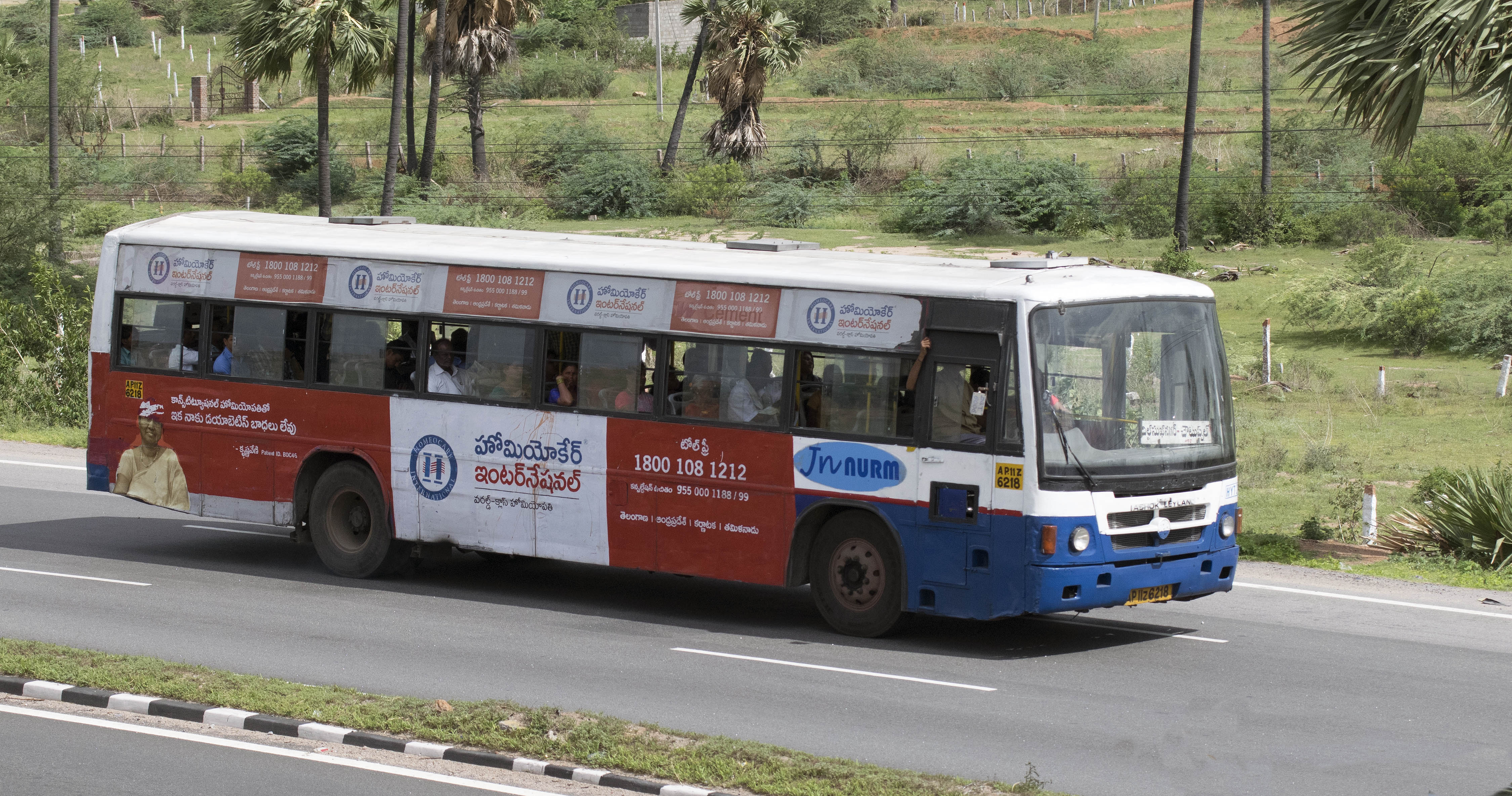
A commuter bus in Hyderabad that is procured as a part of JNNURM

=== State level reforms ===
As of 2012 Gujarat led the tally for the state level reforms, being the only state to have achieved all 10 reforms required by the mission. Five states have achieved 9 out of 10 reforms: Telangana, Andhra Pradesh, Maharashtra, Madhya Pradesh, Orissa and Uttar Pradesh. Public disclosure and community participation laws have initially progressed slowly, with only five states managing to enact them as part of the reform agenda as of 2009. However, as of 2012 community participation laws have been enacted by 22 out of 31 states, and public disclosure laws were enacted by 27 states. 20 states had decentralised the responsibility for water supply and sanitation from the state level to ULBs, and 19 had done so for city planning functions.

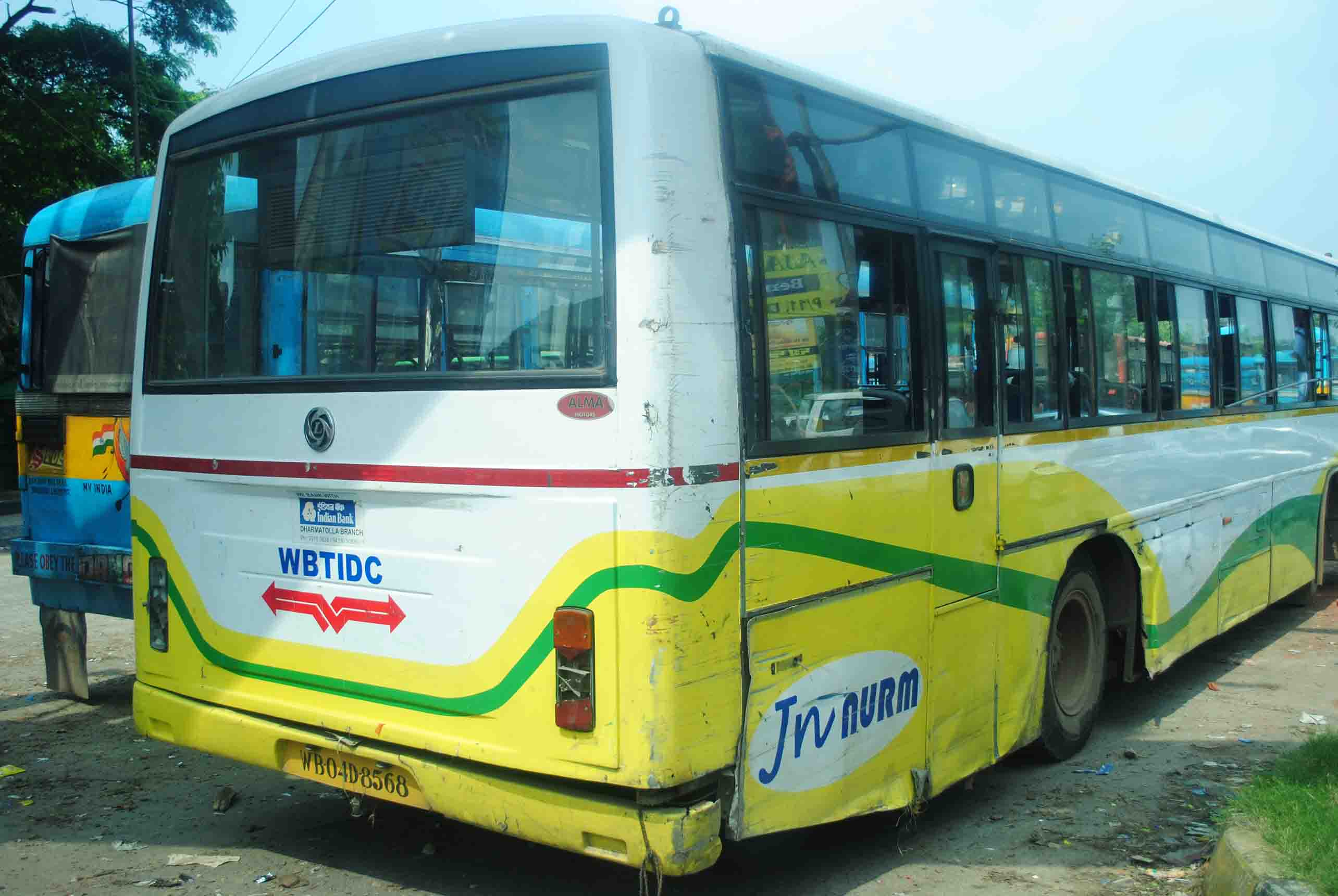
A low-floor bus by JNNURM scheme used by West Bengal Transport Infrastructure Development Corporation Limited, in the capital city of Kolkata

=== City level reform of 2012 ===
Visakhapatnam, Surat and Pune had the distinction of having accomplished all 8 city level reforms. Chennai, Greater Mumbai and Hyderabad had achieved 7 out of 8 reforms. Out of 67 cities, 30 had achieved the 90% target for property tax collection, 20 had achieved full operation and maintenance cost recovery for water supply and sanitation, but only 8 had achieved cost recovery for solid waste.

=== Sanctioning of projects ===
As of 2009, 415 projects requiring an investment of ₹440 billion (US$4.6 billion), equivalent to half the total envisaged program amount, were approved. Among the states, Maharashtra has been sanctioned the maximum number of projects under the mission. Among cities, Bangalore has had the highest number of approved projects.

== Midterm appraisal ==
A midterm appraisal carried out in 2009 by the consulting firm Grant Thornton recommended to establish a single directorate for the ministries in charge of the mission; more involvement of city administrations in the preparation of city development plans that were prepared by consultants; broader stakeholder consultation during environmental and social impact assessments; the development of a national procurement manual; separation of the approval process for projects in two stages; financial support and capacity development for the implementation of reforms in addition to funding for infrastructure; the use of policies for public-private partnerships and pooled funding mechanisms at the state level, such as urban development funds that exist in Tamil Nadu and Orissa.

== Funding shares by city categories ==
Percentage of Funding
Category of Cities/Towns/UAs	Grant		ULB or Para-Statal Share/Loan from Financial Institutions
Category of Cities/Towns/UAs	Centre	State	ULB or Para-Statal Share/Loan from Financial Institutions
Cities/UAs with 4 million plus population as per 2001 census	35%	15%	50%
Cities/UAs with million plus but less than 4 million population as per 2001 census	50%	20%	30%
Cities/towns/UAs in North Eastern States and Jammu & Kashmir	90%	10%	–
Cities/UAs other than those mentioned above	80%	10%	10%
For setting up de-salination plants within 20 km. From sea-shore and other urban areas predominantly facing water scarcity due to brackish water and non-availability of surface source.	80%	10%	10%

== List of identified cities ==
The following table provides for a list of the cities/urban agglomerations (UAs) identified to receive the benefits of JNNURM. They include data pertaining to the state they belong to; the population in these cities given in lakhs as per the census of 2001.

List of identified cities/urban agglomerations (UA) as per 2001 Census
Mega Cities
No.	City/UA	Name of the State	Population (in lakh)
1	Delhi	Delhi	128.77
2	Greater Mumbai	Maharashtra	164.34
3	Hyderabad	Telangana	57.72
4	Bangalore	Karnataka	57.01
5	Chennai	Tamil Nadu	65.60
6	Kolkata	West Bengal	132.06
7	Ahmedabad	Gujarat	45.25
Million-plus Cities/UAs
No.	City/UA	Name of the State	Population (in lakh)
1	Patna	Bihar	16.98
2	Faridabad	Haryana	10.56
3	Bhopal	Madhya Pradesh	14.58
4	Ludhiana	Punjab	13.98
5	Jaipur	Rajasthan	23.27
6	Lucknow	Uttar Pradesh	22.46
7	Madurai	Tamil Nadu	12.03
8	Nashik	Maharashtra	16.52
9	Pune	Maharashtra	37.60
10	Kochi	Kerala	13.55
11	Varanasi	Uttar Pradesh	12.04
12	Agra	Uttar Pradesh	13.31
13	Amritsar	Punjab	10.03
14	Visakhapatnam	Andhra Pradesh	13.45
15	Vadodara	Gujarat	14.91
16	Surat	Gujarat	28.11
17	Kanpur	Uttar Pradesh	27.15
18	Nagpur	Maharashtra	21.29
19	Coimbatore	Tamil Nadu	14.61
20	Meerut	Uttar Pradesh	11.61
21	Jabalpur	Madhya Pradesh	10.98
22	Jamshedpur	Jharkhand	11.04
23	Asansol	West Bengal	10.67
24	Allahabad	Uttar Pradesh	10.42
25	Vijayawada	Andhra Pradesh	10.39
26	Rajkot	Gujarat	10.03
27	Dhanbad	Jharkhand	10.65
28	Indore	Madhya Pradesh	16.40
Identified cities/UAs with less than 1 million population
No.	City/UA	Name of the State	Population (in lakh)
1	Guwahati	Assam	8.19
2	Itanagar	Arunachal Pradesh	0.35
3	Jammu	Jammu & Kashmir	6.12
4	Raipur	Chhattisgarh	7.00
5	Panaji	Goa	0.99
6	Shimla	Himachal Pradesh	1.45
7	Ranchi	Jharkhand	8.63
8	Thiruvananthapuram	Kerala	8.90
9	Imphal	Manipur	2.50
10	Shillong	Meghalaya	2.68
11	Aizawl	Mizoram	2.28
12	Kohima	Nagaland	0.77
13	Bhubaneshwar	Odisha	6.58
14	Gangtok	Sikkim	0.29
15	Agartala	Tripura	1.90
16	Dehradun	Uttaranchal	5.30
17	Bodh Gaya	Bihar	3.94
18	Ujjain	Madhya Pradesh	4.31
19	Puri	Odisha	1.57
20	Pushkar	Rajasthan	5.04
21	Nainital	Uttaranchal	2.20
22	Mysore	Karnataka	7.99
23	Mangalore	Karnataka	6.23
24	Udupi	Karnataka	1.65
25	Pondicherry	Puducherry	5.05
26	Chandigarh	Punjab, Haryana	8.08
27	Srinagar	Jammu and Kashmir	9.88
28	Mathura	Uttar Pradesh	3.23
29	Haridwar	Uttaranchal	2.21
30	Kolhapur	Maharashtra	5.50
31	Guntur	Andhra Pradesh	7.43
32	Kollam	Kerala	3.49
33	Tiruchirappalli	Tamil Nadu	7.52
34	Cuttack	Odisha	5.35

Note: National Steering Group may choose to add or delete cities/UAs/towns under Category-C (other than state capitals) based on the suggestions received from state governments. However, the number of cities under the mission shall remain around 60.

=== Discrepancies in funding for small cities ===
Based on research conducted by the Indian Institute for Human Settlements, 65 cities were allocated 75% of the funding through JnNURM for projects related to Urban Infrastructure and Governance (UIG) and Basic Services for the Urban Poor (BSUP). In contrast, 640 cities received the remaining 25% of funding for initiatives like the Integrated Housing and Slum Development Programme (IHSDP) and the Urban Infrastructure Development Scheme for Small and Medium Towns (UIDSSMT).

Bigger cities received greater per capita investment under JnNURM compared to smaller cities. Moreover, while JnNURM encompassed all residents in cities with a population of one million or more, it only encompassed slightly over half of those in class I cities and less than half of those in classes II, III, and IV cities. According to JnNURM, none of the cities in classes V and VI were included. Larger cities have a greater proportion of urban population served by JnNURM compared to smaller cities.

== See also ==
- Atal Mission for Rejuvenation and Urban Transformation (AMRUT), successor to JnNURM
- Vikas yojna
- Accredited Social Health Activist
- Mahatma Gandhi National Rural Employment Guarantee Act
