= Indian Volley League =

Professional volleyball league in India

- Most recent season or competition: 2011 Indian Volley League
- Sport: Volleyball
- Founded: 2011
- Founder: VFI
- First season: 2011
- No. of teams: 6
- Country: India
- Most recent champion: Chennai Spikers (2011)
- Website: https://www.pistondessport.com/

The Indian Volley League was a professional volleyball league in India and the only Volleyball League in India recognised by the Volleyball Federation of India. It was launched by the Volleyball Federation of India in 2011. The inaugural edition featured six teams and the top players in the country. The Prime Volleyball League has currently replaced it.

== Teams ==
Six teams took part in first season of the Indian Volley League.

Team	Arena	City	Territory
Chennai Spikers	Jawaharlal Nehru Stadium	Chennai	Tamil Nadu
Hyderabad Chargers	Kotla Vijay Bhaskar Reddy Indoor Stadium	Hyderabad	Telangana
Karnataka Bulls	Sree Kanteerava Indoor Stadium	Bangalore	Karnataka
Kerala Killers		Kochi	Kerala
Maratha Warriors		Mumbai	Maharashtra
Yanam Tigers	YSR Indoor Stadium	Yanam	Puducherry

Teams

== IVL 2011 ==
The 2011 Indian Volley League season was the debut season of the Indian Volley League, established by the Volleyball Federation of India in 2011. The season commenced on 29 May 2011 and ended on 24 June 2011. Chennai Spikers were the champions of the inaugural edition.

== See also ==
- Pro Volleyball League
- Prime Volleyball League
