= Yanam bus station =

Bus station in Puducherry, India

General information
- Location: Yanam, Puducherry; India
- Owner: PRTC

Construction
- Structure type: standard (On ground)
- Parking: Yes

Yanam bus station is a bus station located in Yanam town of the Indian state of Puducherry. It is owned by Puducherry Road Transport Corporation. This is one of the major bus stations in the state, with services to other states like Andhra Pradesh, Tamil Nadu and Telangana.
