= Yanam Venkanna Babu Kalyāṇōtsavam =

Venkanna Babu Kalyāṇōtsavām at Yanam is an annual festival at Yanam Venkanna Babu Temple celebrated for twenty four days in the month of Phālguṇa (February/March). The celebration attracts pilgrims and tourists from many parts of around Yanam. Kalyāṇam will be performed on Phālguṇa Śuddha Dvādaśi i.e., on the twelfth day of the festival.

== History ==
Lord Venkateswara residing at Yanam is called by different names Meesaala Venkanna, Chalidikoodu Venkanna, Venkanna Babu. The speciality of the Temple is that the Swamy Idol has big moustaches like Lord Sathyanarayana Swamy of Annavaram. This temple was built by the Chalukya kings of Rajamahendravaram (Rajahmundry) in the 15th century. The sculptures of those period are present in this temple. Though Kalyāṇōtsavām has been performed since old days and Rathotsavam started some 150 years ago with the original Ratha that was sponsored by Kasireddy family. The New Ratham was built in 1952 by the then Committee under then Assemblée Répresentative, Kanakala Tatayya Naidou. The Ratham's weight is around 15 tonnes. It was partially damaged to the heavy cyclonic storm in November 1996 but was renovated in 1998. This Ratham was carried throughout the entire Yanam Town in the early days. After the electrification work, the Ratham's route has been limited from Chinna Center to the Kotha Bus Stand. It is carried by devotees singing slogans and bhajans.

The Kalyāṇōtsavam Festival is celebrated in the month of Phālguṇa (February/March) every year by the people of Yanam in a very grand manner. The festival commences on Phālguṇa Śuddha Pāḍyami with Lord Venkanna Babu's Kalyāṇam. On that day he will be made bridegroom and then a procession on streets with different chariots each day occurs and Ponnavōhanam, Ratha Yātra (Rathōtsavam) and Chakratīrtham are the important events of the festival. Vāhana Samprōkshaṇa (ritual cleansing of the chariot) will be done by priests every day for each Vāhanam used for procession. During the festival days, nearly 1.5 lakhs of devotees come to Yanam to receive the blessings of Lord Venkanna Babu.

== Peṇḍli Kumāruḍu Utsavālu ==
The festival commences on Phālguṇa Śuddha Pāḍyami with Lord Venkanna Babu's making of bridegroom for his Kalyāṇam. This marks the beginning of the festival. The Lord's chariot procession (స్వామివారి వాహన ఊరేగింపు) will also commence from this day. Then a procession on streets with different chariots each day occurs for ten days until Lord's Kalyāṇōtsavam .

=== Sarpa Vāhanam ===
Morning, Lord Venkanna Babu is made as bridegroom for his Kalyāṇam and Vāhanam of the day will be Sarpa Vāhanam (సర్ప వాహనము), i.e., The Serpent Chariot.The Sponsor of the day (ఉత్సవ నిర్వాహకులు) will be Bezawada family of Bezawada Bapanna Naidou.

=== Śeṣa Vāhanam ===
On the second day of the Kalyāṇōtsavam Festival, Vāhanam of the day will be Śeṣa Vāhanam (శేష వాహనము), i.e., The Serpent Chariot. The Sponsor of the day (ఉత్సవ నిర్వాహకులు) will be Guiry family of Guiry Madhavarao.

=== Puṣpaka Vāhanam ===
On the third and fourth days of the Kalyāṇōtsavam Festival, Vāhanam of the day will be Puṣpaka Vāhanam (ఫుష్పక వాహనము), i.e., The Pushpaka Chariot. The Sponsor of the day (ఉత్సవ నిర్వాహకులు) will be Singamsetty family of Singamsetty Lakshmikumari and Chikatla family of Chikatla Varahalamma respectively for the two days.

=== Aśva Vāhanam ===
On the fifth day of the Kalyāṇōtsavam Festival, Vāhanam of the day will be Aśva Vāhanam (అశ్వ వాహనము), i.e., The Horse Chariot. The Sponsor of the day (ఉత్సవ నిర్వాహకులు) will be Nallam family. The present generation sponsor is Sri Nallam Venkatramayya.

=== Sūrya Vāhanam ===
On the sixth day of the Kalyāṇōtsavam Festival, Vāhanam of the day will be Sūrya Vāhanam (సూర్య వాహనము), i.e., The Solar Chariot. The Sponsor of the day (ఉత్సవ నిర్వాహకులు) will be Kamichetty family of Kamichetty Sri Parassourama Varaprassada Rao Naidu.

=== Gaja Vāhanam ===
On the seventh day of the Kalyāṇōtsavam Festival, Vāhanam of the day will be Gaja Vāhanam (గజ వాహనము), i.e., The Elephant Chariot. The Sponsor of the day (ఉత్సవ నిర్వాహకులు) will be Grandhi family of Grandhi Somaganapathirao.

=== Panchamukha Ānjaneya Vāhanam ===
On the eighth day of the Kalyāṇōtsavam Festival, Vāhanam of the day will be Panchamukha Ānjaneya Vāhanam (పంచముఖాంజనేయ వాహనము), i.e., The Five-headed Anjaneya Chariot. The Sponsor of the day (ఉత్సవ నిర్వాహకులు) will be Bhupatiraju family. The present generation sponsor is Sri Bhupatiraju Veerraju. The previous and original sponsors were Bulusu family of Bouloussou Soubramaniam Sastroulou.

=== Simha Vāhanam ===
On the ninth day of the Kalyāṇōtsavam Festival, Vāhanam of the day will be Simha Vāhanam (సింహ వాహనము), i.e., The Lion Chariot. The Sponsor of the day (ఉత్సవ నిర్వాహకులు) will be Yanam Teachers Association.

=== Hamsa Vāhanam ===
On the tenth day of the Kalyāṇōtsavam Festival, Vāhanam of the day will be Hamsa Vāhanam (హంస వాహనము), i.e., The Swan Chariot. The Sponsor of the day (ఉత్సవ నిర్వాహకులు) will be Yanam Settibalija Sangham.

=== Garuda Vāhanam and Dwajārōhaṇam ===
On the eleventh day of the Kalyāṇōtsavam Festival, Vāhanam of the day will be Garuda Vāhanam (గరుడ వాహనము), i.e., The Eagle Chariot. The Sponsor of the day (ఉత్సవ నిర్వాహకులు) will be Chinta family of Chinta Venkatasubbarao.

Dwajārōhaṇam (flag-hoisting) will be held on that night after Vāhana Seva by hoisting a flag (Garuda Dhwaja) with a picture of Garuda (vehicle of Lord Maha Vishnu) on the top of the Dwaja Sthambham (flagpole) in front of the sanctum santorum. It is said to be a symbolic significance of formal invitation to all the deities to attend the Kalyāṇōtsavām festival.

== Kalyāṇōtsavam and Hanumanta Vāhanam ==
On the twelfth day (Phālguṇa Śuddha Dvādaśi) of the Kalyāṇōtsavam Festival, Kalyāṇam performed for Lord (under sponsorship of Chinta family). Vāhanam of the day will be Hanumanta Vāhanam (హనుమంత వాహనము), i.e., The Hanuman Chariot. The Sponsor of the day (ఉత్సవ నిర్వాహకులు) will be Tota family of Tota Gopalaraonaidu.

== Ponna Vāhanam ==
On the thirteenth day of the Kalyāṇōtsavam Festival, Vāhanam of the day will be Ponna Vāhanam (పొన్నవాహనము), i.e., The Ponna Tree Chariot which will be generally of much grandeur than previous ones. The Sponsor of the day (ఉత్సవ నిర్వాహకులు) will be Kapaganty family of Kapaganty Suryaprakasarao. The 'Vāhana Seva' ends on this day.

== Rathōstavam ==
On the fourteenth day (Phālguṇa Śuddha Chaturdaśi) of the Kalyāṇōtsavam Festival there will be Rathōstavam. The Sponsor of the day (ఉత్సవ నిర్వాహకులు) will be Yerra family and Kasireddy family. The Ratha Yatra will commence in evening from Chinna Center all along the Pillaraya Street and ends at New Bus-stand. Later during night, the devotees will visit the Ratha to take Darshan of Lord Venkateswara until next day morning.

== Chakra Tīrtham ==
On the fifteenth day (Phālguṇa Śuddha Pourṇami) of the Kalyāṇōtsavam Festival, in the morning there will be Chakra Tīrtham, also known as Chakra Snānam (Holy dip of Sudarsana Chakra) which will be performed in the Gautami Godavari River. The Sponsor of the day (ఉత్సవ నిర్వాహకులు) will be Madimchetty family. Later there will be procession of Lord on Chandra Vāhanam (చంద్రవాహనము), i.e., The Lunar Chariot. On evening there will be teppōtsavam (Boat festival) in the Gautami Godavari River.

== Pushpa Yaagam ==
From the sixteenth day (Phālguṇa Bahuḷa Pāḍyami) of the Kalyāṇōtsavam Festival there will be Pushpa Yaagam (పుష్పయాగము) i.e., The Flower Ritual of Sacrifice for three days. The Sponsor of the ritual (యాగ నిర్వాహకులు) will be Bezawada family of Bezawada Bapanna Naidou.

== Pavaḷimpu Seva ==
At the end of Pushpa Yaagam, next day there will be Pavaḷimpu Seva on Phālguṇa Bahuḷa Chaviti. The Sponsor of the ritual (సేవ నిర్వాహకులు) will be Manga family of Manga Venkanna.

== Koṭṭāyi Utsavālu ==
From twentieth day there will be Koṭṭāyi Utsavālu (కొఠాయి ఉత్సవాలు), also known as (Challagāli Utsavālu) on for five days. The first day Sponsor of the ritual (ఉత్సవ నిర్వాహకులు) will be family of Raja Bommadevara Mangayamma. Koṭṭāyi means generally a large shed or pent house. However, in a vishnu temple, it meant Kalyana Mandapam. Koṭhāyi Utsavām is feast of tabernacles celebrated generally in Vishnu Temples.

== See also ==
- Yanam Śrī Rājarājeśwara Kalyāṇōtsavam
- Yanam Venkanna Babu Brahmōtsavam
