= Yanam =

Town in Puducherry, India

- - Telugu: యానాం
  - French: Yanaon
- Town
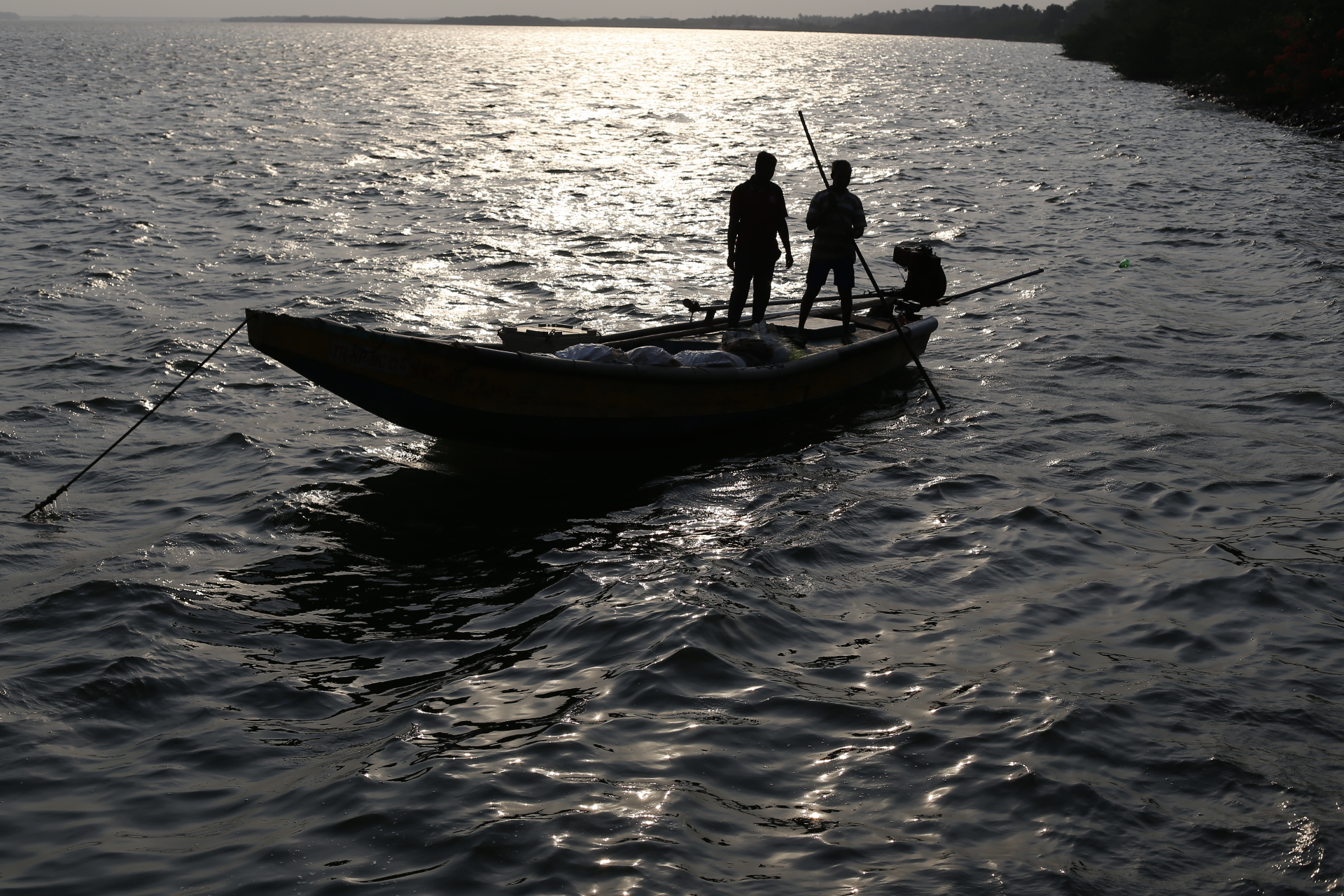
- Goutami River near Yanam

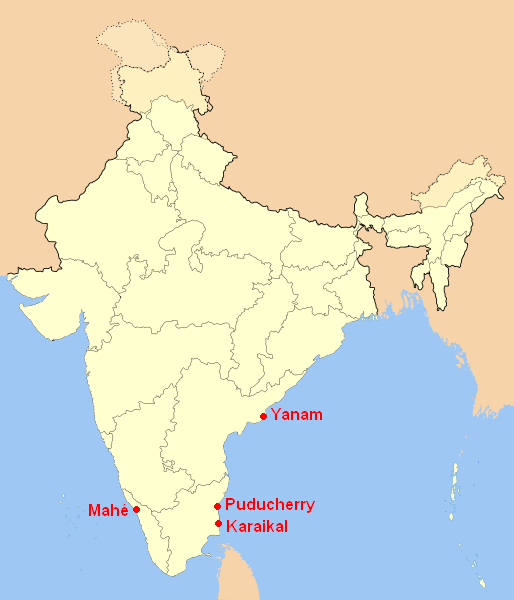
- Location of Yanam District in India along with the other districts of Pondicherry

Location of Yanam in Andhra Pradesh, India
Location of Yanam in India
- Coordinates: 16°44′00″N 82°13′00″E
- Country: India
- Union territory: Puducherry
- District: Yanam
- Established: 1731

Government
  - Type: Municipality
  - Body: Yanam Municipality

Area
  - Total: 30 km^{2} (12 sq mi)
- Elevation: 11 m (36 ft)

Population (2023)
  - Total: 76,000
  - Density: 2,500/km^{2} (6,600/sq mi)

Languages
  - Official: Telugu
  - Additional: English, French
- Time zone: UTC+5:30 (IST)
- PIN: 533 464
- Telephone code: +91-0884
- Vehicle registration: PY 04
- Website: yanam.gov.in

Yanam (Telugu: [jaːnaːw̃]) (previously Yanaon, (French: [janaɔ̃])) is a town located in the Yanam district in Puducherry, India. It has a population of 35,000 and is entirely surrounded by Andhra Pradesh. It was formerly a French colony for nearly 200 years, and, though united with India in 1954, is still sometimes known as "French Yanam". It possesses a blend of French culture and the Telugu culture, nicknamed Frelugu. During French rule, the Tuesday market (Marché du mardi or Maṃgaḷavaram Saṃta) at Yanam was popular among the Telugu people in the Madras Presidency, who visited Yanam to buy foreign and smuggled goods during Yanam People's Festival held in January.

== History ==
The French established a trading post at Yanaon in 1723, making it the third French colony established in India but gave up the area in 1727, after commercial operations proved unsuccessful, but was seized again by Governor-General Dupleix in 1731 but got confirmed by Nizam of Hyderabad in 1751. Until the end of the Napoleonic wars, Yanam went under British control intermittently but was finally restored to France again in 1814.

== Aftermath of liberation ==
The Yanam coup d'état dated 13 June 1954 had enraged the French authorities of Puducherry. Rumours were spread to the effect that the French government were despatching a cruiser to Yanam to capture Merger leaders and to re-establish their authority. After the coup, the last administrator of Yanam, George Sala was recalled by André Ménard, then Governor General of Puducherry in June 1954.

Dadala was also appointed as Acting Commissioner for Yanam for 14 days. Towards the end of June 1954, Kewal Singh paid a visit to Yanam and requested Dadala's return to Pondicherry to continue his activities there. On 3 July, on Kewal Singh's request, Dadala left Yanam, after making all arrangements for its proper administration.

=== De facto transfer ===
Yanam remained under French control till 13 June 1954, when it joined the Republic of India by Indian military action. On 1 November 1954, after long years of freedom struggle the de facto transfer (Vāstavikāntaraṇa) of the four enclaves of Pondicherry, Yanam, Mahé, and Karikal to India was achieved.

The Prime Minister, Jawaharlal Nehru, visited Puducherry on 16 January 1955. Messrs Edouard Goubert, S. Perumal, Dadala and Sri Pakirisamy Pillai presented addresses to Pandit Nehru in a public meeting in the maidan of Gorimedu. Since 2014, 1 November is celebrated as Liberation day throughout Puducherry U.T. and is a public Holiday. This initiative has been taken shortly after the NDA government had taken power in 2014 and then newly appointed Lt. Governor A. K. Singh had issued a notification regarding that decision of central government.

=== 1956 Treaty of cession ===
A treaty of cession was signed by the two countries on 28 May 1956. The de jure transfer was delayed until the end of the Algerian War. The treaty was ratified by the French parliament in May 1962. On 16 August 1962 (De Jure Day) India and France exchanged the instruments of ratification under which France ceded to India full sovereignty over the territories it held.

==== Special administration status ====
According to Traité de cession dated 1956, the four former French colonies were assured of maintaining their special administrative status. That is why Puducherry is the only Union Territory with some special provisions like Legislative Assembly, French as official language, etc. This is the most important article in the Traité de Cession, which ensures and safeguards the personal interest of the people regarding their special administrative status.

The Article II of 1956 Traité de Cession which is valid in both English and French versions, states that,

Ces établissements conserveront le bénéfice du statut administratif spécial en vigueur avant le 1er novembre 1954. Toute modification constitutionnelle à ce statut ne pourra intervenir, le cas échéant, qu’après consultation de la population
(The Establishments will keep the benefit of the special administrative status in force prior to 1 November 1954. Any constitutional changes in this status which may be made subsequently shall be made after ascertaining the wishes of the people.)

=== De jure Transfer ===
Treaty of cession was signed by the two countries in May 1956 was ratified by the French parliament in May 1962. On 16 August 1962 India and France exchanged the instruments of ratification under which France ceded to India full sovereignty over the territories it held. Every year on 16 August, the De jure Transfer Day (Vidhitāntaraṇa Dinamu in Telugu language) was nominally celebrated throughout Puducherry Union Territory. Later, owing to the initiative by the Lt. Governor Kiran Bedi, this day was celebrated for the first time by the Puducherry government. Until 2016 it was merely a public holiday with no official celebrations took place.

=== Merger with the Union Territory of Pondicherry ===
Pondicherry and the settlements of Karikal, Mahé and Yanaon became a Union Territory with effect from 7 January 1963 by the 14th amendment to the Indian Constitution, which was notified in The Gazette of India on 29 December 1962. In the same year, on 10 May, as the people aspired for a popular Government, the Indian Parliament enacted the Government of Union Territories Act, 1963 that came into force on 1 July 1963, and the pattern of Government prevailing in the rest of the country was introduced in this territory also, but subject to certain limitations.

=== Dates of important events of merger of French India ===
Inde française
Establishment	Liberation	Referendum	de facto transfer	Treaty of Cession	de jure transfer	Merger
Pondichéry	Partial^{†}	18 October 1954	1 November 1954	28 May 1956	16 August 1962	1 July 1963 into UT of Pondicherry
Chandernagore	N.A.	19 June 1949	2 May 1950	2 February 1951	9 June 1952	2 October 1954 into State of West Bengal
Karikal	N.A.	18 October 1954	1 November 1954	28 May 1956	16 August 1962	1 July 1963 into UT of Pondicherry
Mahé	16 June 1954	18 October 1954	1 November 1954	28 May 1956	16 August 1962	1 July 1963 into UT of Pondicherry
Yanaon	13 June 1954	18 October 1954	1 November 1954	28 May 1956	16 August 1962	1 July 1963 into UT of Pondicherry

^{†} Some communes of Pondicherry were liberated. The communes of Nettapacom, Tiroubouvane were liberated on 31 March 1954 and 6 April 1954 respectively. Also, some villages of Bahour commune were liberated around same time.

== Geography ==
The district lies in the delta of the Godavari River; the town is situated where at the confluence of the Koringa River, nine kilometres from the Bay of Bengal on the Circar coast.

=== Soil ===
Yanam's soil is alluvium consisting of sand clay and gravel. It is grey black and clay-like in composition. A few thin layers of sandy clay or sand approximating 0.3 metres in thickness, are intercalated with the clay soil. The river sand on the bank of Gauthami, Godavari consist of quartz, felspar and mica, with monazite found in the black streaks. There are no minerals of economic value in the region.

=== Irrigation ===
Yanam receives irrigation water via the Bank Canal, which begins at the Dowleswaram headworks of Sir Arthur Cotton's barrage on the River Godavari, downstream from Rajahmundry. The canal runs towards east to Pillanka, a village near Yanam, and is popularly known as French Channel, having been built under a 1949 agreement between the then French Government and the Government of India. It provides irrigation and drinking water to the areas west of the Coringa River.

After its merger with the Republic of India, irrigation was provided to about 5.6 km^{2} of dry land on the eastern side of the Coringa River by constructing an irrigation canal, the Adivipolam Channel, from the tail end of Tallarevu South Canal and the starting point of the Neelapalli Channel on the right side. The work was undertaken by the Andhra Pradesh Public Works Department in 1964, and was completed and commissioned in June 1966. Like the French Channel, it provides irrigation and drinking water.

== Climate ==
Yanam's climate is characterised by high humidity (over 70% in the day and 60% in the evenings throughout the year), a hot summer season (with humidity of 68 to 80%), and plentiful rainfall. It enjoys the benefits of both the Southwest and Northeast monsoons. Average annual rainfall is 1226 mm.

=== Temperature ===
Temperatures in Yanam range from 27 °C to 45 °C in summer, and 17 °C to 28 °C in winter. From February, temperatures start rising rapidly until May, which is the hottest month, with the mean maximum around 37 °C and mean minimum around 28 °C. Humidity being high, the heat is exhausting. The maximum temperature on some days in May or early June, before the onset of the south-west monsoon, may touch 47 °C. The sea breeze affords some relief in the afternoons.

Similarly, pre-monsoon thunder-showers may also bring relief on some days. With the onset of the monsoon in June the temperature falls rapidly, and usually remains steady until September. In this season the mean maximum temperature is around 32 °C, and night temperatures fall rapidly until December or January, when day temperatures are around 27 °C, and night temperatures around 19 °C. At times the minimum temperature may drop to 14 °C. December and January are the coolest months.

== Demographics ==
Historical population
Year	Pop.	±%
1843	4,000	—
1882	4,536	+13.4%
1884	4,552	+0.4%
1885	4,266	−6.3%
1900	5,005	+17.3%
1901	4,681	−6.5%
1911	4,727	+1.0%
1926	4,995	+5.7%
1931	5,249	+5.1%
1936	5,220	−0.6%
1941	5,711	+9.4%
1948	5,853	+2.5%
1961	7,032	+20.1%
1971	8,291	+17.9%
1981	11,631	+40.3%
1991	20,297	+74.5%
2001	25,511	+25.7%
2011	31,500	+23.5%
2014	35,000	+11.1%

As of 2001 India census, Yanam had a population of 31,362. Males constitute 51% of the population and females 49%. In Yanam, 14% of the population is under 6 years of age.

- 1843 – 4,000
- 1882 – 4,536
- 1884 – 4,552
- 1885 – 4,266
- 1900 - 5,005
- 1901 – 4,681
- 1911 – 4,727
- 1926 – 4,995
- 1931 – 5,249
- 1936 – 5,220
- 1941 – 5,711
- 1948 – 5,853
- 1961 - 7,032
- 1971 – 8,291
- 1981 – 11,631
- 1991 – 20,297
- 2001 - 25,511
- 2011 - 31,500
- 2014 - 35,000

=== Villages ===
Apart from the town of Yanam itself, Agraharam, Darialatippa, Farampeta, Guerempeta, Savithrinagar, Kanakalapeta, Kurasampeta and Mettakur villages fall under the district's jurisdiction.

=== Literacy ===
Yanam has a literacy rate of 79.5%, higher than the national average of 74.04%, with male literacy at 82.8% and female literacy at 76.3%.

== French nationality ==
After liberation, the French government offered citizenship to the people living in colonies of French India, i.e., Pondichéry, Mahé, Karikal and Yanam. French law made it easy for thousands of colons, ethnic or national French from former colonies of North and East Africa, India and Indochina to live in mainland France.

In Yanam, some 10,000 people chose French nationality. According to some estimates, nearly 120 to 150 Telugu families from former French India live in France. On the other hand, there are some French nationals living in Yanam and enjoying French pension (In Telugu, Guddi Pinchanu).

The Yanam French Peoples Association was formed and its president is Penupothu Suryanarayan. As of the 2000s, around 80 French nationals live in Yanam.

== Court House (Palais de justice) ==
The Court building is situated in an ancient white monument building of French architecture. It is called the Palais de justice (Court House) and located at Thiagaraja Street, Yanam to the next of Municipality building. The building has two floors - the ground floor is the court and the first floor is the residential quarters of the judge. The building was renovated in 1967 and inaugurated by Thiru S.L. Silam, the then Lieutenant Governor of Puducherry.

=== Dutch India ===
Yanam Judicial Magistrate Court is an ancient court formed prior to the French domain i.e. before 1725 while Yanam was as a Dutch colony. The Judicial Magistrate Court was existing then.

Subsequently, while this area came under the French on the reorganisation of French domain in 1725 the same court has been converted as French Court under French Law as a Judicial Court. Both civil and criminal cases tried there.

=== After independence ===
After independence, the court was converted as an Indian Court as a Judicial Magistrate Court, Yanam in 1956, whereas, the Regional Administrative Officer of Yanam was the judge of the court having both executive and judicial powers on civil and criminal cases.

After the bifurcation of the judiciary, the court came under a separate Judicial Department of Government of Puducherry and under the administration of the High Court, Madras and it was termed as a Judicial First Class Magistrate Court cum District Munsif Court. Subsequently, under the reform by the High Court, Madras, the Yanam was upgraded to that of a Subordinate Judge (Civil Judge-Senior Division)/Assistant Sessions Judge cum Judicial Magistrate of I Class in 2000. Now because of this upgrade, all the civil cases up to the pecuniary jurisdiction of Rs. 500,000 are triable by the court. On the criminal side, the court has jurisdiction to try all cases up to 307 IPC except cases having a death sentence. Further, the court is empowered to deal with the motor accident claims, family cases, LAOPs (Land Acquisition of Puducherry), etc. Currently, S. D. Srinivas, Sr. Advocate is serving as the Public Prosecutor cum Asst Govt. Pleader since November 2022.

== Notable people ==
- Chellapilla Venkata Sastry (1870–1950), poet
- Samatam Krouschnaya, politician
- Dadala Rafael Ramanayya, leader of the Coup d'État de Yanaon.
- Bezawada Bapa Naidou, politician
- Bouloussou Soubramaniam Sastroulou, politician
- Kamichetty Venugopala Rao Naidou, politician
- His son, Kamisetty Venugopala Rao Naidu, politician
- Malladi Krishna Rao, politician

== Administration ==
=== Local administration ===
Following the introduction of the Pondicherry Municipalities Act, 1973, four municipalities came into existence in Pondicherry, Karaikal, Mahé and Yanam towns. The entities of Karaikal, Mahe and Yanam communes formed the municipalities of Karaikal, Mahe and Yanam. Under the new law, all functions excluding those assigned to the Chairman (i.e., those hitherto exercised by the Mayor) appointed under the municipal decree came to be exercised by the Commissioner. The Mayors were also relieved of their day-to-day administrative responsibilities enabling them to be in greater contact with the public. Commissioners were appointed as the Chief Executive Heads of the Municipalities, in ranks according to the grade of the municipalities.

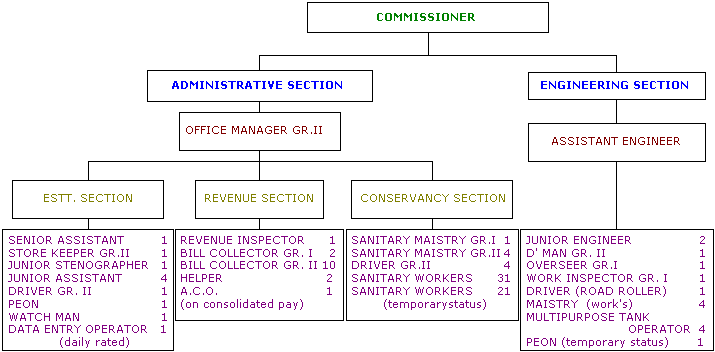
Organigramme of Yanam Municipality

Yanam Municipality is composed of 10 municipal wards,

- Mettakur
- Ambedkar Nagar
- Vishnalayam
- Pillaraya
- Giriumpeta
- Farampeta
- Pydikondala
- Pedapudi
- Aghraharam
- Kanakalapeta

=== Legislative administration ===
As the people aspired for a popular government, the Indian Parliament enacted the Government of Union Territories Act, 1963 that came into force on 1 July 1963, and the pattern of government prevailing in the rest of the country was introduced in this territory. Under Article 239 of the Indian Constitution, the President of India appoints an Administrator to head the administration of the territory. The Pondicherry Representative Assembly was converted into the Legislative Assembly of Pondicherry on 1 July 1963 as per Section 54(3) of The Union Territories Act, 1963 and its members were deemed to have been elected to the Assembly. The elections for the Puducherry Legislative Assembly held since 1964. Thus, the MLAs of Yanam to the First Legislvative Assembly (1963-1964) were Smt.Kamichetty Savithri and Shri Kamichetty Sri Parassourama Varaprassada Rao Naidu. Smt. Savithri also happens to be the First lady MLA of Yanam.

After delimitation in 1964, Yanam was allocated with one seat in the Puducherry Legislative Assembly. From 1964 to 1989, Kamichetty Sri Parassourama Varaprassada Rao Naidu held this constituency as his pocket borough until his death without facing any challenge in winning the seat consecutively in 1964 (INC), 1969 (IND), 1974 (IND), 1977 (JP), 1980 (IND) and in 1985 (INC).

The present MLA of Yanam is Shri. Malladi Krishna Rao. He contested the 2026 Puducherry Legislative Assembly election as an AINRC candidate and won against the then incumbent Shri. Gollapalli Srinivas Ashok.

== Official languages ==
The official languages used in Yanam for most of the official purposed are Telugu and English. French is also an official language of Puducherry Union territory. Though it was official language of French India (1673–1954), its official language status was preserved by Traité de Cession (Treaty of Cession) signed by India and France on 28 May 1956 and Pondicherry assembly resolution in 1963. It remained as de jure official language of Puducherry U.T by the Article XXVIII of 1956 Traité de Cession, which states that,

Le français restera langue officielle des Établissements aussi longtemps que les représentants élus de la population n’auront pas pris une décision différente
(The French language shall remain the official language of the Establishments so long as the elected representatives of the people shall not decide otherwise.)

An official mention in Rajya Sabha Parliamentary debates during 2006 confirm that Puducherry have all these five languages as official.

== Transport ==
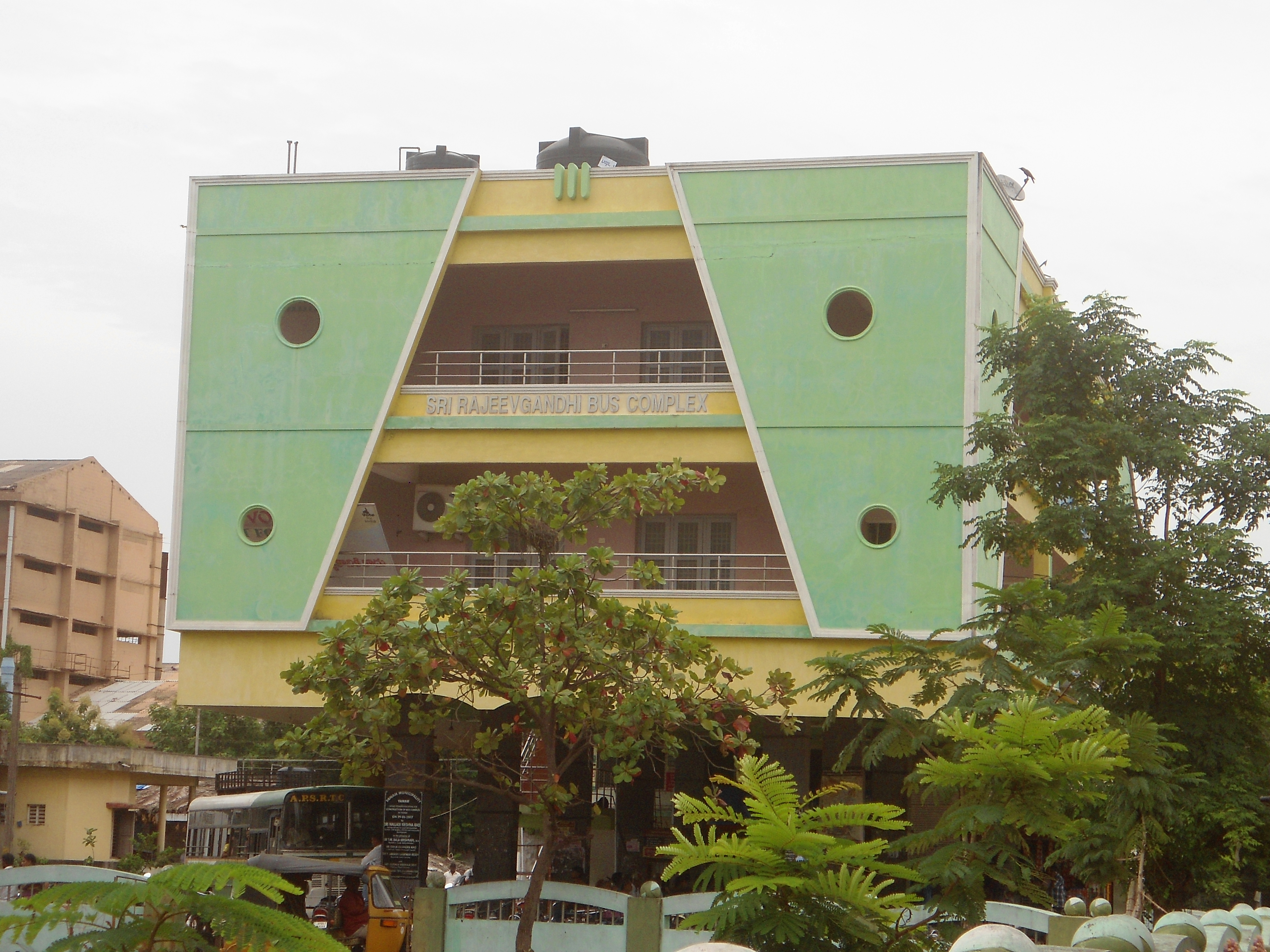
The Rajiv Gandhi Bus Complex building located at the new bus stand of Yanam.

The national highway NH 216 passes through Yanam. The nearest major railway station to the town is Kakinada Town railway station which is nearly 27 km away. The nearest airport to Yanam is Rajahmundry Airport which is 65 km away.

The Yanam bus station is located in the town.

== Vishnalayam ==
Vishnalayam (Temple of Lord Vishnu), also known as the Venkateswara Temple, is a 15th-century temple located on Vishnalayam Street in Yanam. The presiding deity is Lord Venkateswara and his consort Sri Alivelu Manga. The God is well known as "Venkanna Babu", "Chaldikudu Venkanna" and "Meesala Venkanna". The speciality of the Temple is that the Swamy Idol has big moustaches like Lord Sathyanarayana Swamy of Annavaram. Every year, the annual marriage festival known as Yanam Venkanna Babu Kalyāṇōtsavam is celebrated.

== Sports ==
YSR Indoor Stadium is an indoor stadium in the city which has hosted matches of Junior National Badminton Championships, South Zone basketball championships as well as few volleyball and basketball matches. In 2011 the Indian Volley League's third leg matches were held there, and it became the home of the Yanam Tigers.

== See also ==
- Municipal Administration in French India
