= Chennai Spikers =

Franchise volleyball team based in Chennai, Tamil Nadu

- Founded: 2011
- Manager: Jayakumar
- Captain: J. Nadarajan
- League: Indian Volley League

Uniforms
Home	Away

Chennai Spikers, founded in 2011 was a franchise volleyball team based in Chennai, Tamil Nadu that played in the Indian Volley League. Chennai Spikers have won the first edition of the Indian Volley League in 2011.

== Honours ==
=== League ===
- Indian Volley League
  - Champions (1): 2011
